= List of Sigma Alpha Iota members =

Sigma Alpha Iota is an international women's music fraternity. It was established on June 22, 1903, at the University School of Music in Ann Arbor, Michigan. Sigma Alpha Iota's members include musicians, teachers, composers, and conductors. Following are some of the notable men and women who have been honored with Distinguished Membership by Sigma Alpha Iota.

== Members ==
- Martha Atwell (radio director)
- Annie Mottram Craig Batten (singer, vocal instructor, and composer)
- Roberta Bitgood (classical composer)
- Lila-Gene George (composer)
- Joyce Grill (composer, conductor, and professor)
- Susan Cohn Lackman (composer and academic)
- Mary Lynn Lightfoot (choral composer and music publishing editor)
- Marian MacDowell (pianist and co-founder of the MacDowell Colony)
- Sharon Elery Rogers (composer, music educator, and organist)
- Gertrude Auld Thomas (soprano opera singer)
- Bertha Weber (composer and organist)
- Norma Wendelburg (composer and pianist)
- Amy Aldrich Worth (composer, choir director, and organist)
- Glad Robinson Youse (composer)

=== Laureates ===
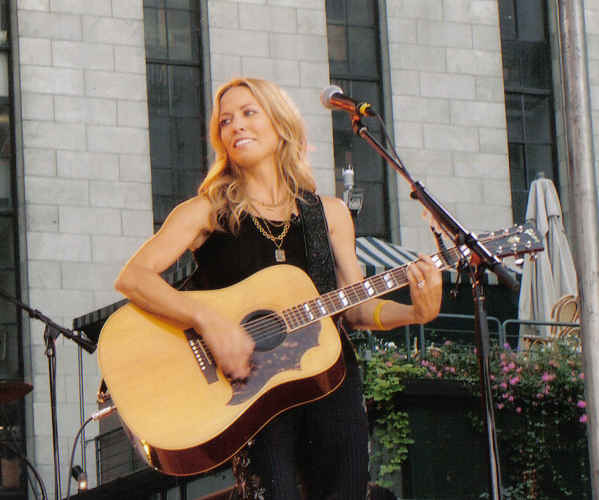
Sheryl Crow

A member laureate is "an initiated member of the fraternity who has achieved international distinction in the music profession. She may be a performer, composer, teacher, author, musicologist, or philanthropist." Some member laureates include:

- Maro Ajemian (pianist)
- Florence Birdwell (educator, musician, and singer)
- Mary Louise Boehm (pianist and painter)
- Bonita Boyd ( flutist, soloist and pedagogue)
- Rosemarie Brancato (soprano)
- Radie Britain (composer)
- Katherine Ciesinski (opera singer)
- Rebecca Copley (soprano opera singer)
- Sheryl Crow (singer and songwriter)
- Jean Dickenson (singer)
- Annamary Dickey (soprano and actress)
- Saramae Endich (opera singer)
- Mary Ann Feldman (music critic)
- Margaret Hillis (conductor)
- Marguerite V. Hood (music educator)
- Katherine Hoover (composer, conductor, and flutist)
- Joyce Johnson (organist)
- Sheila Johnson (violinist and co-founder of BET)
- Libby Larsen (composer)
- Loretta Long (actress, known for Sesame Street)
- Marilyn Mason (concert organist and professor)
- Leona Mitchell (opera singer)
- Dika Newlin (musicologist)
- Jessye Norman (operatic soprano)
- Hilda Ohlin (opera soprano singer)
- Helen Olheim (opera mezzo-soprano)
- Karin Pendle (musicologist)
- Ina Souez (soprano and jazz singer)
- Cheryl Studer (dramatic soprano)
- Joan Wall (operatic mezzo-soprano and voice teacher)
- Gloria Wilson Swisher (composer, music educator, and pianist)
- Marie Sidenius Zendt (soprano)
- Marilyn J. Ziffrin (classical composer)

== Honorary members ==
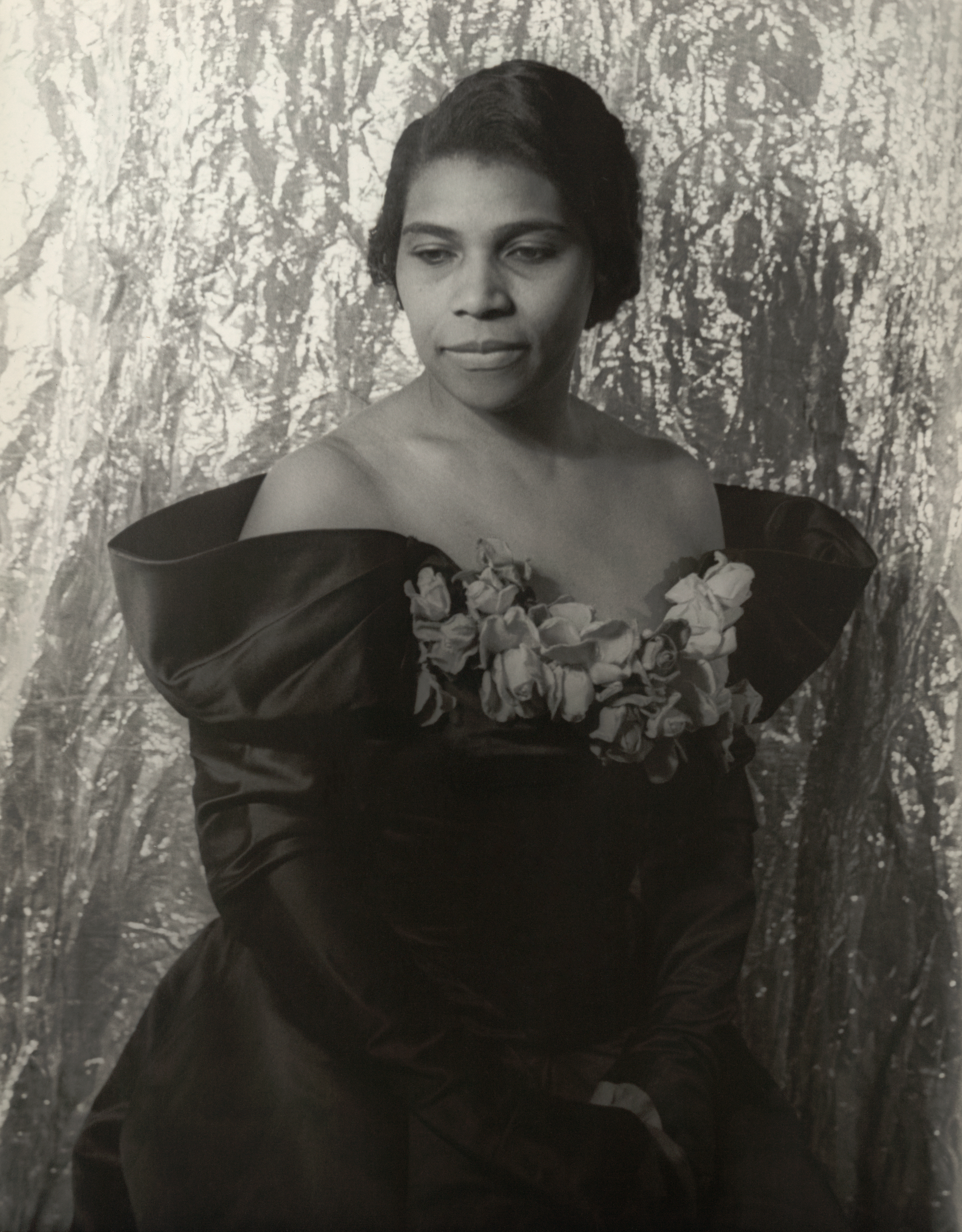
Marian Anderson in 1940

Honorary members are women who have "achieved international distinction in the music profession who are [are] not an initiated member of Sigma Alpha Iota. She may be a performer, composer, teacher, author, musicologist, or philanthropist." Some of its notable honorary members include:

- Anahid Ajemian (violinist)
- Marie-Claire Alain (organist)
- Licia Albanese (operatic soprano)
- Eunice Alberts (opera singer)
- Merle Alcock (contralto and opera singer)
- Betty Allen (operatic mezzo-soprano)
- Elsa Alsen (dramatic soprano and concert singer)
- Marin Alsop (conductor)
- Lucine Amara (soprano)
- Marian Anderson (contralto)
- Josephine Antoine (opera singer)
- Violet Archer (composer, pianist, organist, and percussionist)
- Martina Arroyo (soprano)
- Marina Arsenijevic (pianist and composer)
- Florence Austin (violinist)
- Florence Austral (operatic soprano)
- Olga Averino (opera singer)
- Madi Bacon (musician, choral conductor, and educator)
- Eva Badura-Skoda (musicologist)
- Janet Baker (mezzo-soprano)
- Constance Balfour (soprano)
- Ester Ballou (classical composer)
- Rose Bampton (opera singer)
- Carol E. Barnett (composer)
- Ethel Robertson Bartlett (pianist)
- Wanda L. Bass (philanthropist who donated pianos to schools)
- Eula Beal (opera lyric contralto)
- Teresa Berganza (mezzo-soprano)
- Frances Bible (operatic mezzo-soprano)
- Adelaide Bishop (operatic soprano, musical theatre actress, opera director, and stage director)
- Roberta Bitgood (classical composer)
- Judith Blegen (soprano)
- Helen Boatwright (opera singer)
- Lucrezia Bori (operatic singer)
- Nadia Boulanger (composer, conductor, and teacher)
- Ina Bourskaya (opera singer)
- Karin Branzell (operatic contralto)
- Antonia Brico (conductor and pianist)
- Tamara Brooks (choral conductor)
- Angela Brown (opera singer)
- Elaine Brown (writer, singer, and former Black Panther Party chairwoman)
- Grace Bumbry (opera singer)
- Clara Butt (dramatic contralto)
- Montserrat Caballe (operatic soprano)
- Sarah Caldwell (opera conductor)
- Emma Calve (opera singer)
- Gaby Casadesus (classical pianist and teacher)
- Winifred Cecil (operatic soprano)
- Dorothy Buffum Chandler (performing arts philanthropist)
- Angela Cheng (pianist)
- Kristin Chenoweth (singer and actress)
- Winifred Christie (pianist and composer)
- Frances Clark (pianist)
- Julia Claussen (mezzo-soprano)
- Andrea Clearfield (composer)
- Catherine Comet (conductor)
- Elizabeth Sprague Coolidge (pianist and music patron)
- Mary Costa (actress and singer)
- Regine Crespin (soprano)
- Gilda Cruz-Romo (soprano)
- Gianna D'Angelo (opera singer)
- Bella Davidovich (pianist)
- Gloria Davy (opera singer)
- Monique de la Bruchellerie (pianist)
- Alicia De Larrocha (pianist)
- Jan DeGaetani (opera singer)
- Frances Densmore (anthropologist and ethnographer who studied Native American music)
- Mattiwilda Dobbs (opera singer)
- Ania Dorfmann (pianist and teacher)
- Jessica Dragonette (radio singer)
- Jacqueline du Pré (cellist)
- Mignon Dunn (mezzo-soprano and voice teacher)
- Irene Dunne (actress)
- Deanna Durbin (singer and actress)
- Florence Easton (opera singer)
- Alice Ehlers (harpsichordist)
- Rosalind Elias (mezzo-soprano)
- Chloe Elmo (opera singer)
- Gloria Estefan (singer)
- Eileen Farrell (soprano)
- Ellen Faull (operatic soprano)
- Kathleen Ferrier (singer)
- Vivian Fine (composer)
- Anna Fitzu (soprano)
- Kirsten Flagstad (operatic singer)
- Jorja Fleezanis (violinist)
- Renée Fleming (soprano)
- Grace Fong (pianist and academic)
- Bertha Foster (dean of music at the University of Miami)
- Olive Fremstad (opera singer)
- Marjorie Fulton (violinist)
- Nancy Galbraith (composer)
- Amelita Galli-Curci (coloratura soprano)
- Raya Garbousova (cellist and teacher)
- Nelli Gardini (singer and head of the voice department of the Chicago Musical College)
- Cécile Staub Genhart (pianist and teacher)
- Mary Elaine Gentemann (composer)
- Ester Ferrabini (aka Mrs. Agide Jacchia) (opera singer)
- Alice Gentle (opera singer)
- Herta Glaz (opera singer)
- Carroll Glenn (violinist)
- Denyce Graves (mezzo-soprano)
- Reri Grist (opera singer)
- Hilde Gueden (opera singer)
- Cecelia Hansen (violinist)
- Johanna Harris (pianist, composer, and music educator)
- Janice Harsanyi (opera singer)
- Margaret Harshaw (opera singer)
- Elizabeth Harwood (lyric soprano)
- Markella Hatziano (opera singer)
- Frieda Hempel (soprano)
- Barbara Hendricks (opera singer)
- Nicole Henriot-Schweitzer (pianist)
- Myra Hess (pianist)
- Jennifer Higdon (composer)
- Elsa Hilger (cellist)
- Louise Homer (operatic contralto)
- Lois Hunt (opera singer)
- Sharon Isbin (classical guitarist and the founding director of the guitar department at the Juilliard School)
- Kanako Itō (singer)
- Patricia Prattis Jennings (keyboardist and composer)
- Maria Jeritza (dramatic soprano)
- Camellia Johnson (opera soprano)
- Christine Johnson (contralto opera singer and actress)
- Maryla Jonas (classical pianist)
- Isola Jones (mezzo-soprano opera singer)
- Joan Bennett Kennedy (wife of U.S. Senator Ted Kennedy)
- Olga Kern (pianist)
- Patricia Kern (opera singer)
- Minuetta Kessler (concert pianist and composer)
- Emma Kirkby (soprano)
- Dorothy Kirsten (opera singer)
- Gwendolyn Koldofsky (piano accompanist and music educator)
- Lili Kraus (pianist)
- Beatrice Krebs (opera singer)
- Helen Kwalwasser (violinist)
- Lori Laitman (composer)
- Ruth Laredo (pianist)
- Hulda Lashanska (soprano)
- Marjorie Lawrence (soprano)
- Lotte Lehmann (lyric soprano)
- Sylvia Lent (violinist)
- Rosina Lhevinne (pianist and pedagogue)
- Estelle Liebling (soprano, composer, arranger, and vocal coach)
- Wilma Lipp (soprano)
- Joan Lippincott (concert organist)
- Marguerite Melville Liszniewska (pianist)
- Goeta Ljungberg (soprano)
- Shirley Love (operatic mezzo-soprano)
- Lea Luboshutz (violinist)
- Josephine Lucchese (opera soprano)
- Elsa Ludewig-Verdehr (clarinetist and music educator)
- Kathryn Lukas (flutist and teacher)
- Anne-Sophie Mutter (violinist)
- Marni Nixon (soprano known as "The Voice of Hollywood")
- Dolly Parton (singer and songwriter)
- Irene Pavloska
- Rachel Barton Pine (violinist)
- Leontyne Price (soprano)
- Beverly Sills (soprano)
- Mimi Stillman (flutist)
- Joan Sutherland (soprano)
- Dame Kiri Te Kanawa (soprano)
- Mary Curtis Verna (opera singer)
- Galina Vishnevskaya (soprano opera singer)
- Deborah Voigt (soprano)
- Angelica Morales von Sauer
- Himie Voxman
- Gertrude Price Wollner (composer)
- Oxana Yablonskaya (pianist)
- Glad Robinson Youse (composer)
- Judith Lang Zaimont (classical composer)
- Virginia Zeani (opera singer)
- Fannie Bloomfield Zeisler (pianist)
- Eugenia Zukerman (flutist, writer, and journalist)

== National arts associates ==
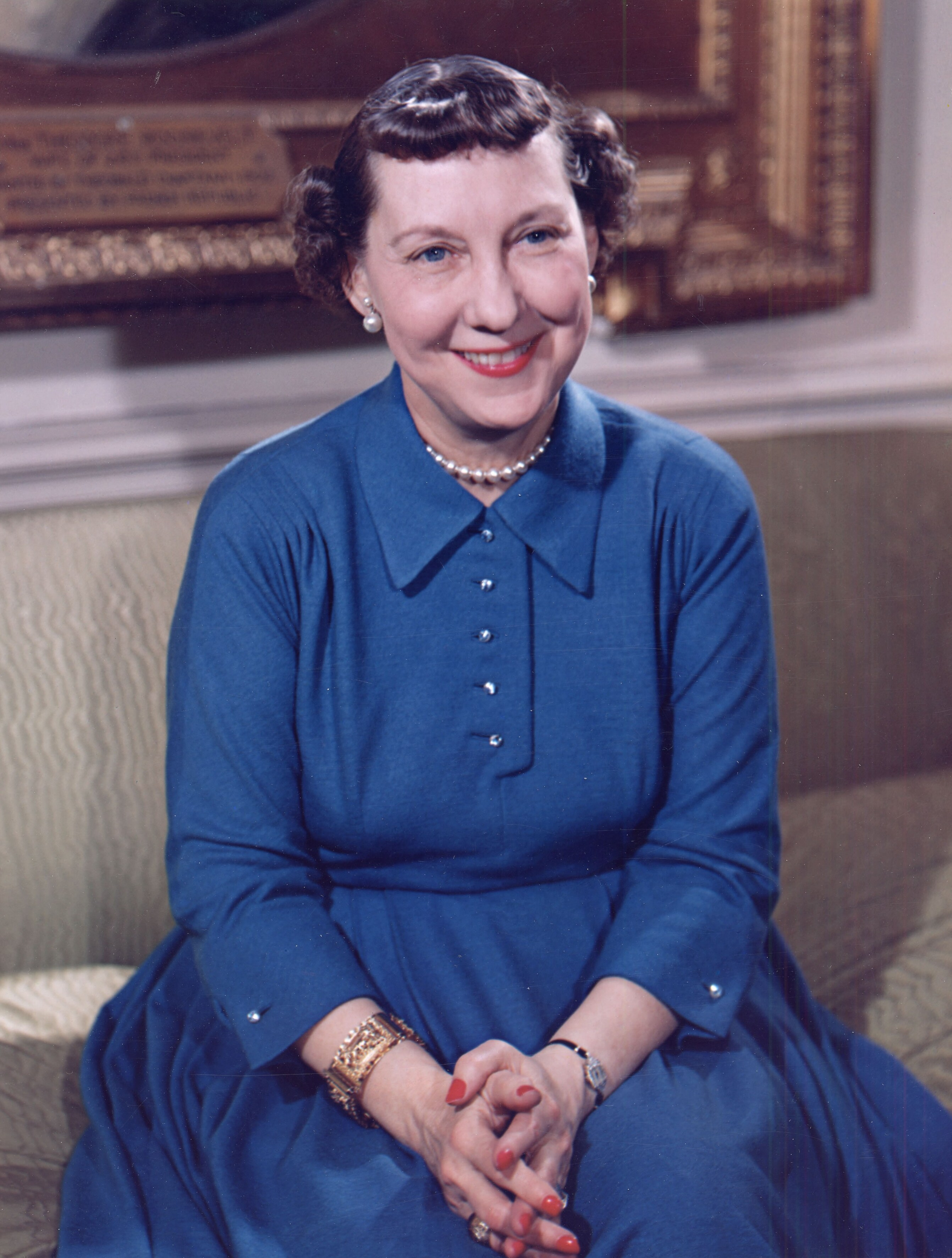
Mamie Eisenhower

The status of national arts associate is awarded to "a man or woman who is nationally recognized for distinguished contribution to the arts." Following are some of the notable national arts associates.

- Beegie Adair (jazz pianist)
- Samuel Adler (composer)
- Jay Bocook (composer)
- Horace Boyer (vocalist, educator, and scholar)
- Quaintance Eaton (opera historian)
- Paul Fritts (organ builder)
- Bradford Gowen (concert pianist and educator)
- Marta Istomin (violinist, cellist, and artistic director)
- Keith Lockhart (conductor)
- Wynton Marsalis (jazz trumpet)
- Temple Painter (harpsichordist and organist)
- Jeannie G. Pool (composer and author)
- Robert Ward (composer)
- Rayburn Wright (trombonist, composer, and conductor)
- Pinchas Zukerman (violinist, violist, and conductor)

== Patronesses ==
A patroness is "a woman actively interested in community musical affairs, in the endeavors of the collegiate or alumnae chapter, and the purpose of the Fraternity, who has been invited by a collegiate or alumnae chapter to join SAI." Some notable patronesses include:

- Mamie Eisenhower (Epsilon Beta chapter), First Lady of the United States
- Pat Nixon, First Lady of the United States
- Bess Truman, First Lady of the United States
