= Otello discography =

Recordings of the Verdi opera

This is a list of audio and video recordings (discography) of Giuseppe Verdi's 1887 opera Otello.

Recordings of excerpts, i.e., individual arias, duets and scenes from Otello, are not included. Many such recordings of celebrated tenors, baritones and sopranos have been reissued on CD and make for fascinating comparative listening. Recordings made in the early 1900s by the creators of the roles of Otello and Iago, namely Francesco Tamagno and Victor Maurel, are among those now available in digital formats.

In 1969, the English music critic Harold Rosenthal contended that among recordings of the complete opera, a 1947 recording of an NBC radio broadcast of the opera conducted by Arturo Toscanini and featuring singers Herva Nelli, Ramón Vinay and Giuseppe Valdengo, was musically one the best of the available versions. RCA Victor has issued the Toscanini recording several times on commercial LPs and on CD in digitally remastered form. In addition, performances of Otello were captured live as early as the 1920s (at the Royal Opera House, Covent Garden, London) and the 1930s (at the Metropolitan Opera, New York City, the latter via the Metropolitan Opera radio broadcasts). They, too, are available on CD reissues.

== Audio recordings ==
Year	Cast (Otello, Desdemona, Iago, Cassio, Emilia)	Conductor, Opera house and orchestra	Label
1931–1932	Nicola Fusati; Maria Carbone; Apollo Granforte; Piero Girardi; Tamara Beltacchi	Carlo Sabajno; La Scala Orchestra and Chorus	CD: Preiser Records; Cat: 20012
1938	Giovanni Martinelli; Elisabeth Rethberg; Lawrence Tibbett; Nicholas Massue; Thelma Votipka	Ettore Panizza; Metropolitan Opera orchestra and chorus	CD: Naxos Historical; Cat: 8.111018-19
1941	Giovanni Martinelli; Stella Roman; Lawrence Tibbett; Alessio de Paolis; Thelma Votipka	Ettore Panizza; Metropolitan Opera orchestra and chorus	CD: Arkadia; Cat: 50003
1944	Torsten Ralf; Hilde Konetzni; Paul Schöffler; Josef Witt; Elena Nikolaidi	Karl Böhm; Wiener Staatsoper orchestra and chorus Performed in German	CD: Myto; Cat: MCD 922.60
1946	Torsten Ralf; Stella Roman; Leonard Warren; Alessio de Paolis; Martha Lipton	George Szell; Metropolitan Opera orchestra and chorus	CD: Walhall; Cat: WLCD 0107
1947	Ramón Vinay; Herva Nelli; Giuseppe Valdengo; Virginio Assandri; Nan Merriman	Arturo Toscanini; NBC Symphony Orchestra and chorus	LP: RCA Victor; Cat: LM-6107; Decca Cat: RB 16093-5; CD: RCA Victor; Cat: 60302
1948	Giovanni Martinelli; June Haas-Kelly; Cesare Bardelli; John Carmen Rossi; Mildred Ippolito	Giuseppe Bamboschek; Orchestra and chorus of La Scala Opera	CD: Grammofono; Cat: 2000 AB 78.935/36
1948	Ramón Vinay; Licia Albanese; Leonard Warren; John Garris; Martha Lipton	Fritz Busch; Metropolitan Opera orchestra and chorus	CD: Preiser; Cat: 90377
1950	Mario Del Monaco; Delia Rigal; Carlos Guichandut; Eugenio Valori; Emma Brizzi	Antonino Votto; Teatro Colon orchestra and chorus	CD: Myto; Cat: 004 H051
1951	Ramón Vinay; Carla Martinis; Paul Schöffler; Anton Dermota; Sieglinde Wagner	Wilhelm Furtwängler; Vienna Philharmonic and Wiener Staatsoper chorus	CD: EMI; Cat: CMS 5 65751-2
1951	Gino Sarri; Anna La Polla; Antonio Manca Serra; Athos Cesarini; Ada Landi	Alberto Paoletti; Teatro dell'Opera di Roma	CD: Preiser Records; Cat: 20031
1953-54	Set Svanholm; Aase Nordmo-Lovberg; Sigurd Björling; Arne Ohlson; Bette Björling	Sixten Ehrling; Kungliga Hovkapellet and chorus Performed in Swedish	CD: Preiser; Cat: 90754
1954	Mario Del Monaco; Renata Tebaldi; Leonard Warren; Giuseppe Zampieri; Anna Maria Canali	Antonino Votto; La Scala	CD: Melodram; Cat: CDM 270101
1954	Mario Del Monaco; Renata Tebaldi; Aldo Protti; Piero de Palma; Luisa Ribacchi	Alberto Erede; Accademia Nazionale di Santa Cecilia orchestra and chorus	CD: Decca; Cat: 440 245-2
1955	Ramón Vinay; Gré Brouwenstijn; Otakar Kraus; John Lanigan; Noreen Berry	Rafael Kubelik; Royal Opera House Chorus and Orchestra	CD: Royal Opera House Heritage; Cat: ROHS 001
1958	Mario Del Monaco; Victoria de los Angeles; Leonard Warren; Paul Franke; Rosalind Elias	Fausto Cleva; Metropolitan Opera orchestra and chorus	CD: Pristine; Cat: Paco154
1958	Ramón Vinay; Antonietta Stella; Giuseppe Taddei; Italo Pasini; Zaira Negroni	Thomas Beecham; Teatro Colón	CD: IDIS; Cat: 6547/48
1959	Mario Del Monaco; Gabriella Tucci; Tito Gobbi; Mariano Caruso; Anna Di Stasio	Alberto Erede; NHK Symphony Orchestra and Chorus	CD: Opera d'Oro, OPD-1160.
1960	Mario Del Monaco; Floriana Cavalli; Tito Gobbi; Agostino Lazzari; Dora Minarchi	Franco Capuana; Teatro dell'Opera di Roma	CD: Myto; Cat: 00267
1960	Jon Vickers; Leonie Rysanek; Tito Gobbi; Florindo Andreolli; Miriam Pirazzini	Tullio Serafin; Rome Opera Orchestra and Chorus	LP: RCA Gold Seal; Cat: AGL3-1969; CD: RCA Red Seal; Cat: 8875196362
1961	Mario Del Monaco; Renata Tebaldi; Aldo Protti; Nello Romanato; Ana Raquel Satre	Herbert von Karajan; Wiener Philharmoniker and Wiener Staatsopernchor	CD: Decca; Cat: 028941161826
1967	James McCracken; Montserrat Caballé; Tito Gobbi; Ermanno Lorenzi; Shirley Love	Zubin Mehta; Metropolitan Opera orchestra and chorus	CD: Living Stage; Cat: LS 4035175
1968	James McCracken; Gwyneth Jones; Dietrich Fischer-Dieskau; Piero de Palma; Anna Di Stasio	John Barbirolli; Philharmonia Orchestra and Ambrosian Chorus	CD: EMI; Cat: 65296
1973	Jon Vickers; Mirella Freni; Peter Glossop; Aldo Bottion; Stefania Malagù	Herbert von Karajan; Berliner Philharmoniker and Chor der Deutsche Oper Berlin	CD: EMI; Cat: CMS 769 3082
1976	Plácido Domingo; Mirella Freni; Piero Cappuccilli; Giuliano Ciannella; Jone Jori	Carlos Kleiber; La Scala Orchestra and Chorus	CD: Opera d'Oro; Cat: OPD 7005
1977	Carlo Cossutta; Julia Varady; Piero Cappuccilli; Benito Maresca; Gudrun Wewezow	Carlos Kleiber; Bayerische Staatsoper	CD: Golden Melodram; Cat: GM 5.0061
1977	Carlo Cossutta; Margaret Price; Gabriel Bacquier; Peter Dvorský; Jane Berbié	Georg Solti; Wiener Philharmoniker Wiener Staatsoperchor and Wiener Sängerknaben	CD: Decca; Cat: 440-045-2
1978	Plácido Domingo; Renata Scotto; Sherrill Milnes; Paul Crook; Jean Kraft	James Levine; National Philharmonic Orchestra and Chorus	LP: RCA Red Seal; Cat: CRL3-2951; CD: RCA Red Seal; Cat: 8883729722
1983	Charles Craig; Rosalind Plowright; Neil Howlett; Bonaventura Bottone; Shelagh Squires	Mark Elder; English National Opera; Performed in English	CD: Chandos; Cat: CHAN 3068
1987	Plácido Domingo; Anna Tomowa-Sintow; Renato Bruson; Kaludi Kaludov; Margarita Lilowa	Zubin Mehta; Choir and Orchestra of the Vienna State Opera	CD: Orfeo; Cat: C698072I
1991	Giuseppe Giacomini; Margaret Price; Matteo Manuguerra; Dino Di Domenico; Martine Mahé	Alain Lombard; Orchestra National Bourdeaux Aquitaine	CD: Forlane; Cat: 216 774
1991	Luciano Pavarotti; Kiri Te Kanawa; Leo Nucci; Anthony Rolfe-Johnson; Elzbieta Ardam	Georg Solti; Chicago Symphony Orchestra and Chorus	CD: Decca (London); Cat: 433 669-2
1994	Plácido Domingo; Cheryl Studer; Sergei Leiferkus; Ramón Vargas; Denyce Graves	Myung-whun Chung; Opéra Bastille, Paris	CD: Deutsche Grammophon; Cat: 439 805-2
1996	Nicola Martinucci; Miriam Gauci; Eduard Tumagian; Mauricio Septien; Mabel Perelstein	Alexander Rahbari; Barcelona Symphony Orchestra and National Orchestra of Catalonia	CD: Koch; Cat: DICD 929 435-6
2010	Simon O'Neill; Anne Schwanewilms; Gerald Finley; Allan Clayton; Eufemia Tufano	Colin Davis; London Symphony Orchestra and chorus	CD: LSO Live; Cat: 0700
2013	Aleksandrs Antoņenko; Krassimira Stoyanova; Carlo Guelfi; Juan Francisco Gatell; Barbara di Castri	Riccardo Muti; Chicago Symphony Orchestra and Chorus	CD: CSO Resound; Cat: CSOR 901 1301
2014	Robert Dean Smith; Raffaella Angeletti; Sebastian Catana; Luis Dámasco; Marifé Nogales	Friedrich Haider; Oviedo Filarmonía	CD: Naxos; Cat: 866035758
2017	Nikolai Schukoff; Melody Moore; Lester Lynch; Jun Ho You; Helena Zubanovich	Lawrence Foster; Gulbenkian Orchestra and choir	CD: Pentatone; Cat: PTC 5186562
2020	Jonas Kaufmann, Federica Lombardi; Carlos Álvarez; Liparit Avetisyan; Virginie Verrez	Antonio Pappano; Chorus and Orchestra dell'Accademia Nazionale di Santa Cecilia	CD: Sony; Cat:19439707932

== Video recordings ==
Year	Cast (Otello, Desdemona, Iago, Cassio, Emilia)	Conductor, Opera house and orchestra (production details)	Label
1978	Jon Vickers, Renata Scotto, Cornell MacNeil, Raymond Gibbs, Jean Kraft	James Levine, Metropolitan Opera Orchestra & Chorus (Recorded live, 25 September 1978; production: Franco Zeffirelli)	DVD: Met Opera; Cat: 811357012185; Streaming video: Met Opera on Demand
1979	Plácido Domingo, Gilda Cruz-Romo, Sherrill Milnes, Giuliano Ciannella, Shirley Love	James Levine, Metropolitan Opera Orchestra & Chorus (Recorded live, 24 September 1979; production: Franco Zeffirelli)	Streaming video: Met Opera on Demand
1982	Vladimir Atlantov, Kiri Te Kanawa, Piero Cappuccilli, Antonio Bevacqua, Flora Rafanelli	Zoltán Peskó, Verona Arena	DVD: Warner Music Vision; Cat: 4509 99214 2
1986	Plácido Domingo, Katia Ricciarelli, Justino Díaz, Ezio di Cesare, Petra Malakova	Lorin Maazel, La Scala Orchestra & Chorus (Otello, film directed by Franco Zeffirelli)	DVD: MGM; Cat: 0 27616 88420 6
1992	Plácido Domingo, Kiri Te Kanawa, Sergei Leiferkus, Robin Leggate, Claire Powell	Georg Solti, Royal Opera House Orchestra & Chorus	DVD: Kultur Video; Cat: 0 32031 14929 8
1995	Plácido Domingo, Renée Fleming, James Morris, Richard Croft, Jane Bunnell	James Levine, Metropolitan Opera Orchestra & Chorus (Recorded live, 13 October 1995; production: Elijah Moshinsky)	DVD: DGG; Cat: 00440 073 0929; Streaming video: Met Opera on Demand
2001	Christian Franz, Emily Magee, Valery Alexeev, Stephan Rügamer, Katharina Kammerloher	Daniel Barenboim, Berliner Staatsoper	DVD: ArtHaus Musik; Cat: 100 347
2001	Plácido Domingo, Barbara Frittoli, Leo Nucci, Cesare Catani, Rossana Rinaldi	Riccardo Muti, La Scala Orchestra & Chorus	DVD: TDK; Cat: 8 2412100019 6
2006	José Cura, Krassimira Stoyanova, Lado Atanelli, Vittorio Grigolo, Ketevan Kemoklidze	Antoni Ros-Marbà, Chorus & Orchestra of the Gran Teatre del Liceu, Barcelona (Recorded live, February 2006; stage director: Willy Decker)	Blu-ray/DVD: Opus Arte; Full HD: medici.tv
2008	Aleksandrs Antonenko, Marina Poplavskaya, Carlos Álvarez, Stephen Costello, Barbara di Castri	Riccardo Muti, Salzburg Festival, Salzburg Mozarteum Orchestra, Vienna Philharmonic, Salzburg Festival Children's Chorus; Vienna State Opera Chorus (Recorded live, 5–10 August 2008, staged by Stephen Langridge)	Blu-ray: C Major/Unitel Classica
2012	Johan Botha, Renée Fleming, Falk Struckmann, Michael Fabiano, Renée Tatum	Semyon Bychkov, Metropolitan Opera Orchestra & Chorus (Recorded live, 27 October 2012; production: Elijah Moshinsky)	HD video: Met Opera on Demand
2015	Aleksandrs Antoņenko, Sonya Yoncheva, Željko Lučić, Dimitri Pittas, Jennifer Johnson Cano	Yannick Nézet-Séguin, Metropolitan Opera Orchestra & Chorus (Recorded live 17 October 2015; production: Bartlett Sher)	Blu-ray/DVD: Sony Classical; HD video: Met Opera on Demand
2016	José Cura, Dorothea Röschmann, Carlos Álvarez, Benjamin Bernheim, Christa Mayer	Christian Thielemann, Salzburg Festival; Staatskapelle Dresden; Saxon State Opera Chorus; Salzburg Festival and Theatre Children's Chorus (Recorded live, 16–27 March 2016, Großes Festspielhaus; stage director: Vincent Boussard)	Blu-ray/DVD: C Major; Full HD: Unitel
2017	Jonas Kaufmann, Maria Agresta, Marco Vratogna, Frédéric Antoun, Kai Rüütel	Antonio Pappano, Royal Opera House Orchestra & Chorus (Recorded live, 28 June 2017; director: Keith Warner)	Blu-ray: Sony; Cat: 88985491969
2025	Brian Jagde, Asmik Grigorian, Gabriele Viviani, Airam Hernàndez, Enkelejda Shkoza	Nicola Luisotti, Orchestra & Chorus of the Teatro Real, Madrid (Recorded live, 25 September 2025; stage director: David Alden)	Full HD: Teatro Real de Madrid
