= Stensland =

Stensland is a surname. Notable people with the surname include:

- Andreas Stensland Løwe (born 1983), Norwegian jazz pianist
- Daniel Stensland (born 1989), Norwegian footballer
- Dawn Stensland-Mendte (born 1964), American talk show host
- Grace Nelson Stensland (1877–1907), American singer better known as Nelli Gardini
- Gunnar Stensland (1922–2011), Norwegian footballer
- Ingvild Stensland (born 1981), Norwegian footballer
- Leiv Stensland (1934–2020), Norwegian politician
- Oddleif Stensland (born 1973), Norwegian vocalist and guitarist
- Sveinung Stensland (born 1972), Norwegian politician
