= Nancy Plummer Faxon =

American singer (1914–2005)

- Born: Nancy Blanton Plummer; November 19, 1914; Jackson, Mississippi, United States
- Died: February 1, 2005 (aged 90); New England Baptist Hospital, Boston Massachusetts
- Occupations: soprano, music educator, composer
- Known for: choral and orchestral compositions for performance at Trinity Church, Boston
- Spouse: George Faxon (m. 1941; died 1992)
- Children: 3
- Parents: Walter George Plummer (father); Emily Blanton Plummer (mother)

Nancy Plummer Faxon (November 19, 1914 – February 1, 2005) was an American soprano, music educator, and composer of organ music.

== Early life and education ==
Nancy Blanton Plummer was born in Jackson, Mississippi, the daughter of Walter George Plummer and Emily Blanton Plummer. She graduated from Millsaps College in 1936. As a young woman she was in theatrical productions with fellow Mississippian Eudora Welty. She went on to earn master's degrees in voice and piano in 1938, at Chicago Musical College, where she was a student of Rudolph Ganz and Nelli Gardini. She studied composition with Max Wald.

== Career ==
As a young soprano in Chicago, Nancy Plummer joined the Sorrentine Touring Opera Company in 1938 as a soloist. She also sang in the chorus of the Chicago Opera Company. From 1955 to 1980, she was a soprano in the professional choir at Trinity Church, Boston. After marrying in 1941, she turned more to teaching and church work. During World War II, she taught voice in Nashville, Tennessee and worked in the music program at a Methodist church in Evanston, Illinois. She later taught at her alma mater, Millsaps College, and at the Chaloff School of Music in Boston, Massachusetts, and played organ at a church in Chestnut Hill, Massachusetts.

Nancy Plummer Faxon was a member of American Women Composers. She wrote over a hundred choral and orchestral compositions, mostly for performance at Trinity Church. The Brookline Library Music Association gave a concert of Faxon's compositions in 1985. A CD titled The Music of Nancy Plummer Faxon (2001) was recorded by the Ralph Farris Chorale and the Madison Symphony, at the Old South Church in Boston. In 1986, she was the recipient of the Orah Ashley Lamke Award from Mu Phi Epsilon, as a distinguished alumna of the sorority.

== Personal life ==
Nancy Plummer married George Faxon in 1941. They had three children. George was an organist and choirmaster, and the Faxons often collaborated on developing and presenting Nancy's compositions. She was widowed when George died in 1992. Nancy Plummer Faxon died from leukemia in 2005, at age 90, at New England Baptist Hospital in Boston.
