= Shirley Love =

Shirley Love may refer to:

- Shirley Love (mezzo-soprano)
- Shirley Love (politician)
