= Cossutta =

Cossutta is an Italian surname. Notable people with the surname include:

- Araldo Cossutta (1925–2017), American architect of Croatian origin
- Armando Cossutta (1926–2015), Italian communist politician
- Carlo Cossutta (1932–2000), Italian dramatic tenor
