= Sarah Caldwell =

American opera conductor (1924–2006)

- Born: March 6, 1924; Maryville, Missouri, U.S.
- Died: March 23, 2006 (aged 82); Portland, Maine, U.S.
- Education: Hendrix College; University of Arkansas; New England Conservatory of Music
- Occupations: Opera conductor; impresario; stage director

Sarah Caldwell (March 6, 1924 – March 23, 2006) was an American opera conductor, impresario, and stage director.

== Early life ==
Caldwell was born in Maryville, Missouri, and grew up in Fayetteville, Arkansas. She was a child prodigy and gave public performances on the violin by the time she was ten years old. She graduated from Fayetteville High School at the age of 14.

Caldwell graduated from Hendrix College in 1944 and attended the University of Arkansas as well as the New England Conservatory of Music. She won a scholarship as a viola player at the Berkshire Music Center in 1946. In 1947, she staged Vaughan Williams's Riders to the Sea. For 11 years she served as the chief assistant to Boris Goldovsky.

== Career ==
Caldwell moved to Boston, Massachusetts, in 1952 and became head of the Boston University opera workshop. In 1957 she started the Boston Opera Group with $5,000. This became the Opera Company of Boston, where she staged a wide range of operas and established a reputation for producing difficult works under pressure. She was also known for putting together interesting variations on standard operas.

=== Productions with Opera Company Boston and related companies ===
Highlights in Boston that she conducted and/or stage directed included Le voyage de la lune, Otello (with Tito Gobbi as Iago), Command Performance (world premiere), Manon and Faust (both with Beverly Sills and Norman Treigle), Lulu (U.S. East Coast premiere), I puritani (with Dame Joan Sutherland), Intolleranza (U.S. premiere), Boris Godunov (original version), Hippolyte et Aricie (U.S. stage premiere, with Plácido Domingo), La bohème (with Renata Tebaldi and Domingo), Moses und Aron (U.S. premiere), The Rake's Progress, Bluebeard's Castle, Carmen (with Marilyn Horne), Macbeth (original version), The Good Soldier Schweik, The Fisherman and His Wife (world premiere, with Muriel Costa-Greenspon), La finta giardiniera, Norma (with Sills), Les Troyens, Don Carlos (U.S. premiere of original French version), Don Quichotte, War and Peace (U.S. stage premiere, with Arlene Saunders), Benvenuto Cellini (U.S. premiere, with Jon Vickers), I Capuleti e i Montecchi, Montezuma (U.S. premiere), Ruslan and Ludmila (U.S. premiere), Rigoletto (with Sills, Richard Fredricks, and Susanne Marsee), Stiffelio (U.S. stage premiere), La damnation de Faust, Tosca (with Magda Olivero), La vide breve, El retablo de maese Pedro, The Ice Break (U.S. premiere), Aïda (with Shirley Verrett in the title role and Markella Hatziano as Amneris), Die Soldaten (U.S. premiere), The Invisible City of Kitezh, Taverner (U.S. premiere), The Makropoulos Case (with Anja Silja, William Cochran, and Chester Ludgin), Médée (in French and Greek with Josephine Barstow in the title role and Markella Hatziano as Neris), Dead Souls (U.S. premiere), Der Rosenkavalier (with Dame Gwyneth Jones) and, finally, The Balcony (world premiere, 1990).

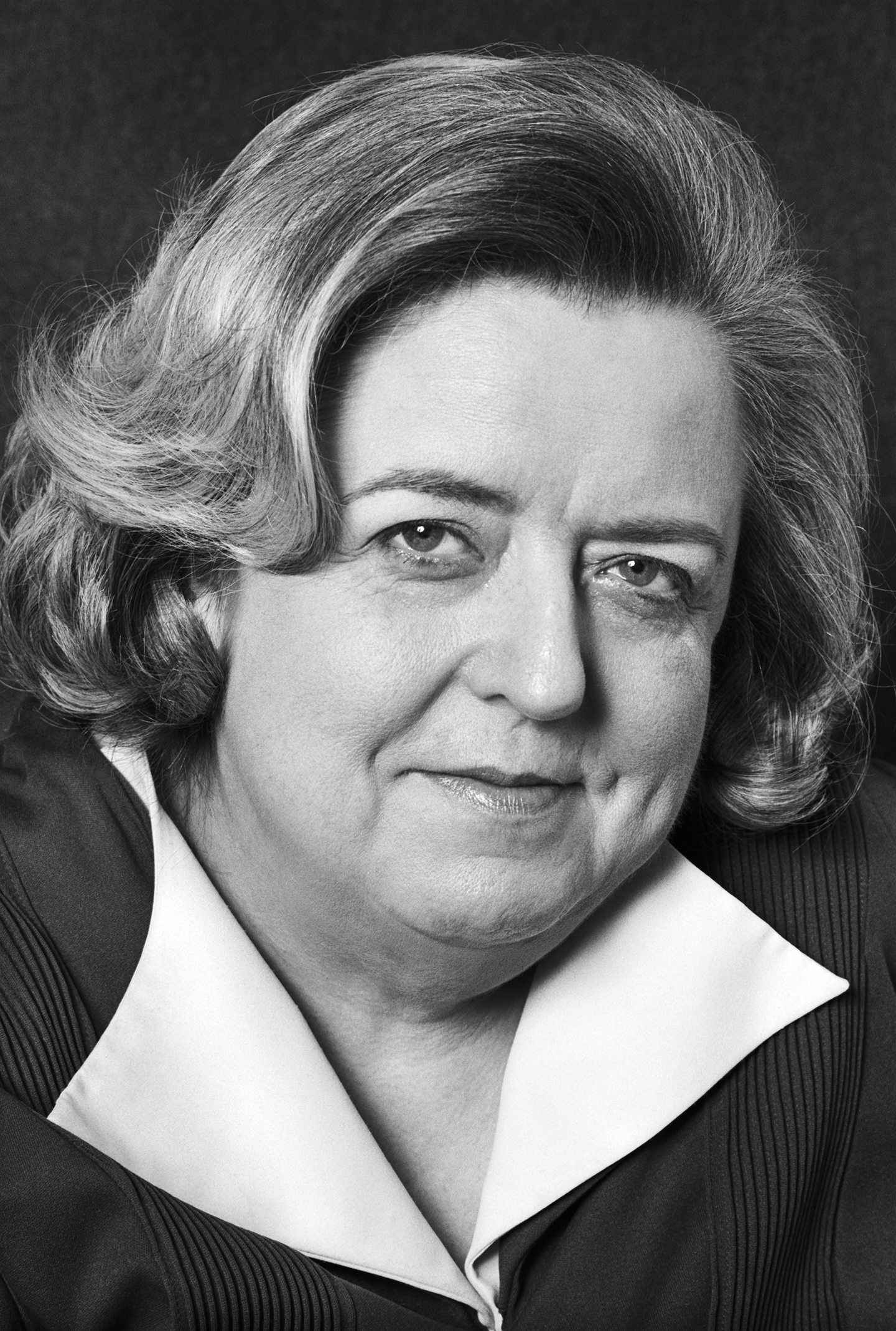
Sarah Caldwell photographed in 1977 by Lynn Gilbert

In the 1980s, Opera New England, a branch of Ms. Caldwell's Opera Company of Boston, was the touring ambassador of opera to the New England states. She employed young professional singers in productions that were fully staged and with orchestra. She organized financing through local, state and federal funding which included the National Endowment for the Arts, Massachusetts Council of the Arts & Humanities, Connecticut Commission on the Arts, New Hampshire Commission of the Arts and the Maine Commission on the Arts & Humanities.

=== Productions in New York, Pennsylvania and Minnesota ===
At the New York City Opera, Caldwell staged Der junge Lord and Ariadne auf Naxos (with Carol Neblett), both in 1973.

She became the second woman to conduct the New York Philharmonic in 1974 with an all-female programme of composers including Ruth Crawford Seeger, Lili Boulanger and Thea Musgrave.

On 13 January 1976, Caldwell became the first female conductor at the Metropolitan Opera, with La traviata (with Sills).

In 1976, she both conducted and directed Il barbiere di Siviglia (with Sills and Alan Titus), which was televised over PBS. She also directed John La Montaine's U.S. Bicentennial opera Be Glad Then, America with Odetta (Muse for America), Donald Gramm (various patriots), Richard Lewis (King George III), David Lloyd (Town Crier), and the Penn State University Choirs and the Pittsburgh Symphony.

In 1978, she led L'elisir d'amore at the Metropolitan, with José Carreras and Judith Blegen. She appeared with the New York Philharmonic, the Pittsburgh Symphony Orchestra, the St. Paul Chamber Orchestra, and the Boston Symphony Orchestra.

In 1979 she conducted and directed a televised production of Falstaff (with Donald Gramm).

Caldwell also directed one non-musical production, the 1981 Lincoln Center staging of Shakespeare's Macbeth, presented on cable TV in 1982. It starred Philip Anglim and Maureen Anderman, with a then-unknown Kelsey Grammer in the supporting role of Ross.

== Awards ==
In 1975 Caldwell received a D.F.A. from Bates College. In 1997 she received the National Medal of Arts. She has been inducted into the Arkansas Entertainers Hall of Fame.

== Personal life, death and legacy ==
Sarah Caldwell lived for a time at the architecturally significant Lincoln House in Lincoln, Massachusetts.

Caldwell retired in 2004. She died in 2006 from heart failure at Maine Medical Center in Portland, Maine. She is remembered on the Boston Women's Heritage Trail.

== Studio discography ==
- Donizetti: Don Pasquale (Sills, Kraus, Titus, Gramm; Caldwell, 1978) EMI

== Videography ==
- Rossini: Il barbiere di Siviglia (Sills, H.Price, Titus, Gramm, Ramey; Caldwell, Caldwell, 1976) [live]

== Quotes ==
- Learn everything you can, anytime you can, from anyone you can - there will always come a time when you will be grateful you did.
- If you approach an opera as though it were something that always went a certain way, that's what you get. I approach an opera as though I didn't know it.
- If you can sell green toothpaste in this country, you can sell opera.
- Success is important only to the extent that it puts one in a position to do more things one likes to do.

Adapted from the article () Sarah Caldwell, from Wikinfo, licensed under the GNU Free Documentation License.

== Bibliography ==
- Challenges: A Memoir of My Life in Opera, by Sarah Caldwell (with Rebecca Matlock), Wesleyan University Press, 2008. ISBN 0-8195-6885-6
- Daniel Kessler (2008). Sarah Caldwell: The First Woman of Opera. Scarecrow Press. ISBN 978-0-8108-6110-7.
- The Boston Opera Company 1909-1915, by Quaintance Eaton, Appleton-Century Press, (1965) New York.
