= Don Rodrigo =

1964 opera

- Opera by Alberto Ginastera
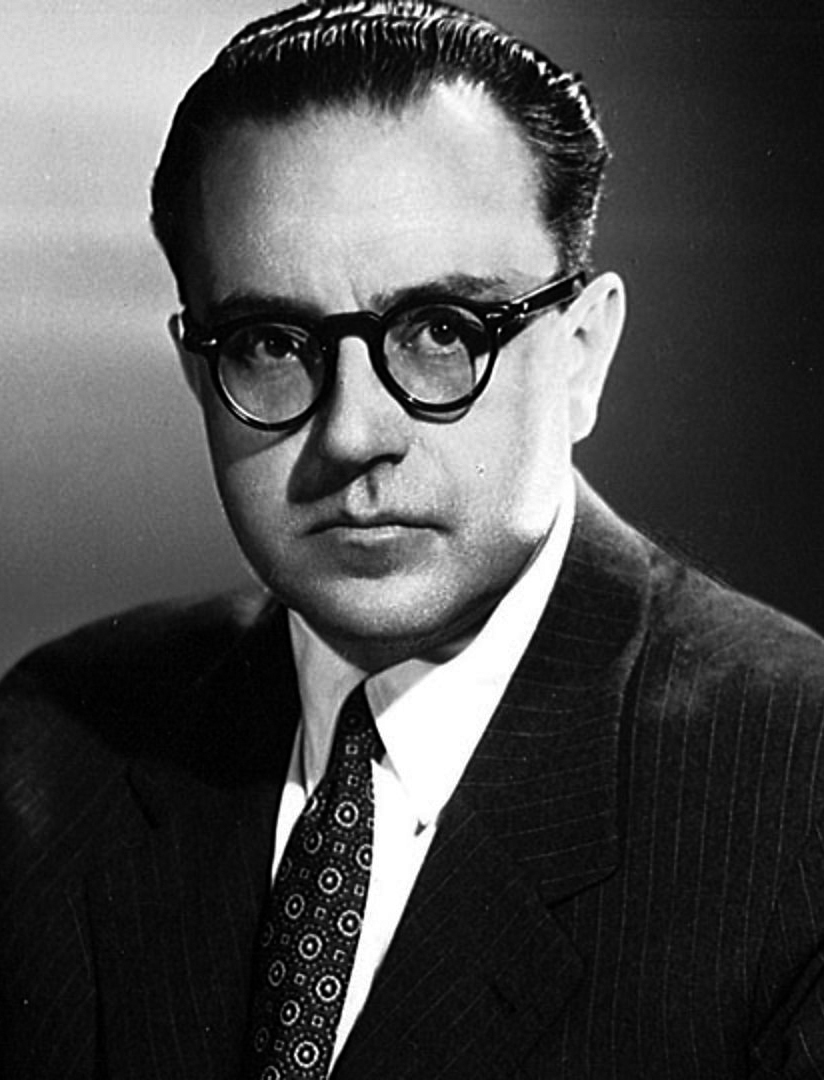
- Ginastera circa 1960
- Librettist: Alejandro Casona
- Language: Spanish
- Premiere: 24 July 1964; Teatro Colón

Don Rodrigo is an opera in three acts by Alberto Ginastera, the composer's first opera, to an original Spanish libretto by Alejandro Casona. Ginastera composed the opera on commission from the Municipality of the City of Buenos Aires, Argentina. The first performance was at the Teatro Colón, Buenos Aires, Argentina on 24 July 1964 with Carlo Cossutta in the title role. The production was directed by Jorge Petraglia and conducted by Bruno Bartoletti.

On February 22, 1966, Plácido Domingo had his international breakthrough by singing the title role of this opera at the US premiere of the work by the New York City Opera. Other cast members included Jeannine Crader as Florinda, Spiro Malas as Teudiselo, the king's tutor, and David Clatworthy as Don Julian, Florinda's father. Julius Rudel conducted, and the opera received 9 performances at New York City Opera. In November 1967 the production was also given, still with Plácido Domingo, on tour at the Dorothy Chandler Pavilion in Los Angeles. Ginastera prepared from the opera a concert work for soprano and orchestra, which received its own first performance in October 1964.

Malena Kuss has published a detailed study of Ginastera's use of motives and of Argentine musical idioms in the opera. Pola Suares Urtubey has published an analysis of the dramatic structure of the opera.

== Roles ==
- Don Rodrigo, King of Spain (dramatic tenor)
- Don Julian, Governor of Ceuta (baritone)
- Florinda, daughter of Don Julian (dramatic soprano)
- Teudiseld, Don Rodrigo's tutor (bass)
- Fortuna, maidservant to Florinda (mezzo-soprano)
- First maiden (soprano)
- Second maiden (mezzo-soprano)
- Bishop (baritone)
- Blind hermit (baritone)
- First page (tenor)
- Second page (baritone)
- First blacksmith (tenor)
- Second blacksmith (baritone)
- First messenger (tenor)
- Second messenger (baritone)
- Young messenger (contralto)
- Voice in the dream (deep bass)
- Peasant boy (child)
- Peasant girl (child)

== Synopsis ==
The setting is Toledo, Spain in the 8th century. A note is that Don Rodrigo is also the Spanish name for Roderic, the last Visigothic king of Spain. The three acts of the opera are divided into nine scenes linked by interludes, with labeling of the scenes as follows:

Act I

- Scene 1: Victory
- Scene 2: Coronation
- Scene 3: Secret

Act II

- Scene 4: Love
- Scene 5: Outrage
- Scene 6: Message

Act III

- Scene 7: Dream
- Scene 8: Battle
- Scene 9: Miracle

The scenes mirror each other in a format resembling a dramatic palindrome, with Scene 1 mirrored in Scene 9, Scene 2 mirrored in Scene 8, and so on, with Scene 5 forming the dramatic climax and fulcrum of the story.

At the start, Don Rodrigo has avenged an attack on his father. He is then about to be crowned King of Spain. Don Julian, Governor of Ceuta in Africa, introduces the King to his daughter Florinda. Rodrigo promises Don Julian that he will look after her as a daughter if she is permitted to stay at the royal court. At the coronation of Rodrigo, Florinda drops the crown. Although some regard this accident as a baleful sign, Rodrigo then retrieves the crown and places it on his own head. Historically, a chest in the Vault of Hercules has contained a locked mystery, which every King of Spain has respected since ancient times. However, Rodrigo opens the locked chest, where he sees the secret in the form of an Arab flag and a curse. The curse states that he who has opened the chest will be the last of his dynasty and that the Arabs will enslave Spain.

Later, Florinda bathes in a fountain, which Rodrigo sees. He goes to Florinda’s bedroom at night, and rapes her. Rodrigo then abandons her. Florinda writes to her father, angrily calling for revenge on Rodrigo.

Don Julian raises a rebellion against Don Rodrigo. At the battle at Guadalete, Don Julian is victorious against Don Rodrigo, which allows the Moors to enter Spain, fulfilling that part of the curse. Rodrigo becomes a penniless vagrant, and eventually finds shelter with a blind hermit. Florinda eventually discovers Rodrigo there. Rodrigo confesses his sins, and finally dies in Florinda's embrace.
