= Lila-Gene George =

American composer

- Born: September 25, 1918; Sioux City, Iowa
- Died: December 22, 2017 (aged 99) Wharton, Texas
- Occupation: Composer
- Instrument: Piano

Lila-Gene George (September 25, 1918 – December 22, 2017) was an American composer and pianist. Her work included chamber music, piano and vocal music. She graduated from the University of Oklahoma and studied under several prominent composers, later performing in the United States and abroad.

== Early life ==
George was born in Sioux City, Iowa, on September 25, 1918. Her parents were Eugene Preston and Lila (nee Pickle) Plowe. She grew up in Elk City, Kansas. Upon the death of her stepfather when she was 13, she moved with her mother to Oklahoma City, Oklahoma, to live near her grandparents.

== Education ==
George graduated from the University of Oklahoma with a B.A. in English and French in 1939 and a bachelor's in music theory in 1940. She completed postgraduate work at Northwestern University in 1950. George was a Sigma Alpha Iota alumna, and in 1969 won the Sigma Alpha Iota Oklahoma Composer's Award.

George had studied piano under her mother and stepfather as a child. Later she studied under Nadia Boulanger, one of the leading composition teachers in the 20th century, for nine summers (Note: According to Flute Music by Women Composers: An Annotated Catalog, she studied with Boulanger from 1971 to 1974.) in Fontainebleau, France, and with Narcis Bonet for two summers. From 1963 to 1965 she studied under German-American composer Otto Luening at Columbia University.

== Career ==
George performed in concerts and lecture recitals across the United States, in Central America, in South America, and in Europe. She held solo performances as part of the Oklahoma City Little Symphony and the Houston Summer Symphony. During the 1940s, George was a part of the pianists' division of the Ladies' Music club in Oklahoma City, Oklahoma. As an adjudicator for the National Piano Guild, she judged a student piano recital at a festival sponsored by the San Jacinto Music Teachers Association in March 1972.

On November 20, 1986, it was reported that George would have a recital at the Horton Foote Theater at Wharton Junior Community College that Sunday. She was a private piano teacher in South America (1948–1952), New York City (1961–1965), and Houston (1955–1966 and 1971). George's studio was based in Houston, Texas. She gave lecture recitals which discussed music that was used by Maurice Dumesnil when he was touring in South America.

== Personal life ==
After graduating college, she married on September 11, 1941, to Richard P. George, a petroleum engineer. They were married for 66 years until Richard's death.

George was an active philanthropist and donor to organizations like the Houston Symphony, the Junior League of Houston, the Houston Friends of Music (now Chamber Music Houston), and the International Alliance of Women in Music in memory of noted composer and fellow Boulanger student, Louise Talma.

George died on December 22, 2017, in Wharton, Texas. Her memorial service was held at the St. Thomas' Episcopal Church in Wharton on January 4, 2018.

== Compositions ==
George wrote chamber music and compositions for the piano. She also wrote two sheet music, Merry-Go-Round for Christmas (1965) and For Winter's Rains and Ruins are Over (Atalanta in Calydon) (1965). For Winter's Rains and Ruins are Over set a poem by English poet Algernon Charles Swinburne to music.

George is listed in Flute Music by Women Composers: An Annotated Catalog, The World Who's Who of Women, Volume 2, and the International Encyclopedia of Women Composers.

== Reception ==
A 1941 article in The Daily Oklahoman said that "Mrs. Lila Gene George, in the MacDowell Sonata Tragica, showed excellent promise for so young a player, and is obviously a serious worker".

In 1969, George won an award for an original music composition contest sponsored by a women's organization in Tulsa. The award for first place was $50.
