= Cecilia Hansen =

Russian violinist (1897–1989)

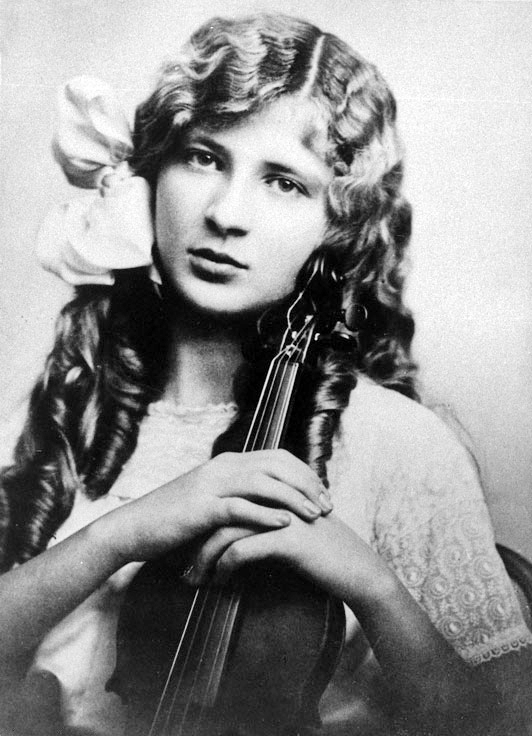

Cecilia Hansen (Russian: Цецилия Генриховна Ганзен, romanized: Tsetsiliya Genrikhovna Ganzen; married name Zakharova; February 4 (16), 1897 Kamenskaya – July 27, 1989, London) was a Russian violin virtuoso and music teacher.

== Early life and career ==
Cecilia Hansen was born on February 4 (16), 1897 in the town of Kamenskaya in Don Host Oblast. Her father Henrik, a Dane originally from Southern Jutland, was a music teacher and her older sister Frida (born in 1893) was adept at playing the fortepiano. While Cecilia also gravitated towards the fortepiano, she switched to the violin when she was three. Because of Cecilia's talent on the violin, her father took her to the Saint Petersburg Conservatory to study with Leopold Auer when she was ten.

In 1910, at the age of 13, Hansen made her concert debut. A year later, she won a gold medal with her interpretation of the Beethoven violin concerto. A few years later, she won first prize in a competition. The same year, in 1914, she received 1200 rubles from the Anton Rubinstein Foundation, but the start of World War I prevented her from going on tour.

In 1916, Hansen met the pianist Boris Zakharoff, a student of Rimsky-Korsakov and Anna Yesipova, and a close friend of Sergei Prokofiev. The same year, she and Boris got married and left on a tour of Scandinavia. The year after, on May 18, 1917, their daughter Tatyana was born (1917–2006).

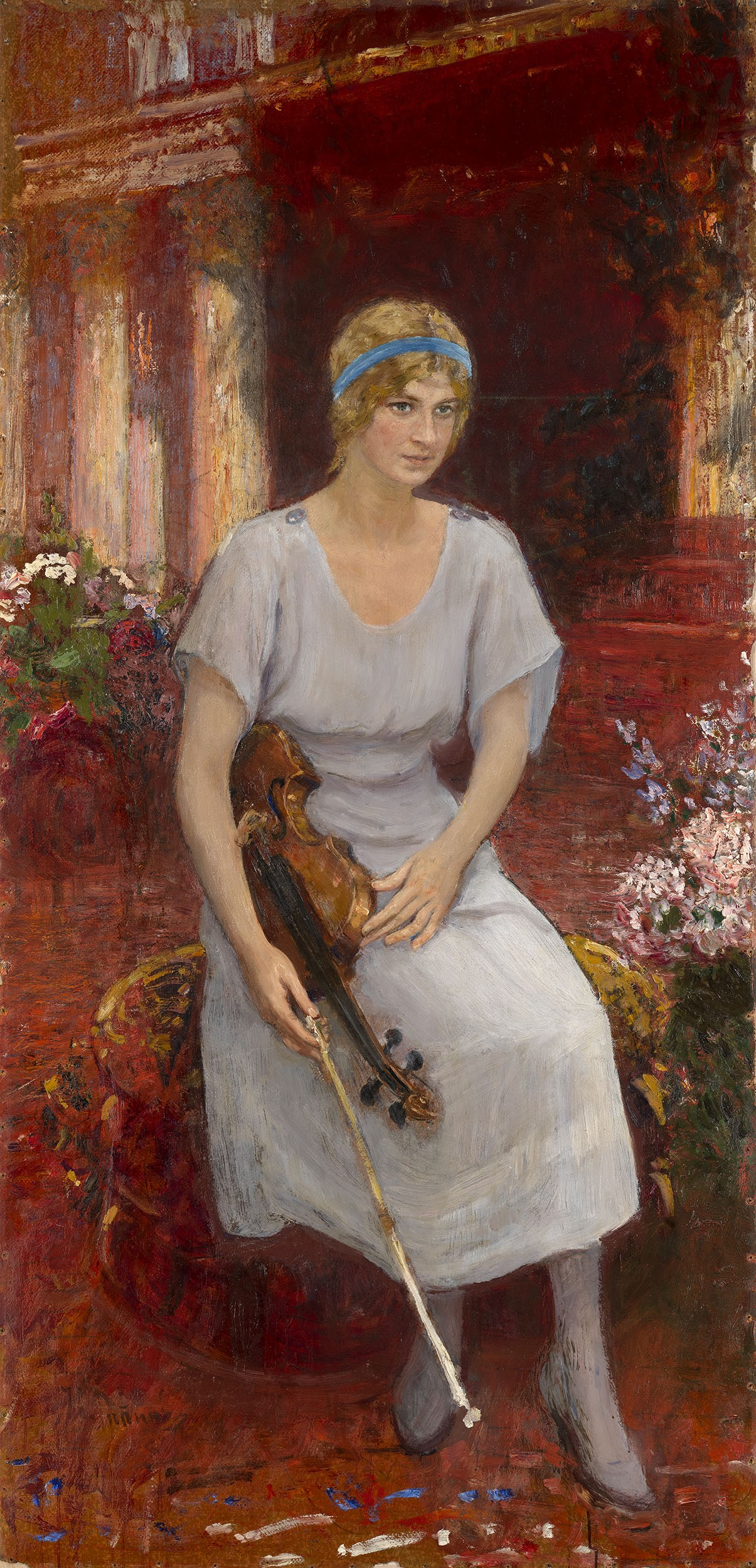
Portrait of Hansen by Ilya Repin

The Zakharoffs settled in Saint Petersburg. At this time, they became close to many famous people, including the artist Ilya Repin. The Zakharoffs took part in the evenings that took place at the Repin's dacha The Penates in Kuokkala, outside of Saint Petersburg. In 1922, Repin painted two versions of Cecilia's portrait at his dacha.

In 1921, the Zakharovs left the country, fleeing from the turmoil of the civil war after the Russian Revolution. Cecilia went on a tour of continental Europe and Scandinavia with her husband Boris. In 1923–24 they went on a tour of the USA, performing in San Francisco, Boston, and Chicago to great acclaim. In 1925, Sergei Prokofiev dedicated the second of his Five Melodies, Op 35bis to her. It was during this time that her extant recordings were made for Victor Records.

While on tour of the Far East in the late 1920s, Boris told his wife that he was staying in Shanghai as he was tired of playing second fiddle to her career. Cecilia returned to the West, while Boris stayed in China to teach fortepiano at the Shanghai Music Institute.

In 1931, she met the German lawyer, polymath, and philosopher Hermann Friedmann, whom she went on to marry. In 1933, when the Nazis came to power, their family was forced to flee to France due to Friedman's Jewish roots. From France, they moved to London where one of her daughters died during a bombing raid in 1940.

In 1950, Hermann Friedmann was offered a position teaching philosophy at the University of Heidelberg in West Germany. Cecilia also taught at Heidelberg and was a professor at the Higher School of Music.

After her second husband died, Hansen moved to London to live with her surviving daughter Tatyana. Hansen died on July 24, 1989, in London, where she was also buried.
