= Mary Lynn Lightfoot =

American choral composer

- Born: 1952 (age 72–73) Canton, Missouri, U.S.
- Occupation(s): Conductor, Composer, Editor
- Instrument(s): Piano, French Horn

Mary Lynn Lightfoot (born 1952) is an American choral composer and music publishing editor. From Canton, Missouri, Lightfoot has published over 300 choral pieces during her career. Her works are well known and often cited in research and choral literature because of their age-appropriate difficulty and apt textual settings.

== Early life ==
Lightfoot's first musical experience was taking piano lessons from age four through high school. She also played the French horn and earned a French horn scholarship to Truman State University.

== Education ==
Lightfoot graduated from Truman State University with a bachelor's degree in music education. She graduated Magna Cum Laude and was part of the music fraternity Sigma Alpha Iota, from which she received a scholarship award.

== Career ==
Lightfoot began her career as a teacher, spending eight years teaching in both private and public schools. During that time, Lightfoot served as the assistant director for the Mid-America Youth Chorale's concert tour of Europe. She was also the Director of Youth Choirs and Assistant Chancel Choir Director for Blue Ridge Presbyterian Church in Raytown, Missouri. Following her teaching stint, Lightfoot worked in music publishing as the Executive Editor for Heritage Music Press, the educational music division of the Lorenz Corporation. Lightfoot held the position for 25 years before she became the founding editor of an educational choral series designed for school-aged choirs called "Sing! Distinctive Music for Classroom, Concert, and Festival." She held this position for five years. As of 2023, Lightfoot has composed over 300 choral works, with her body of literature covering various styles and cultures.

== Influence in scholarly works ==
Lightfoot's pieces have appeared in numerous academic papers and studies often as examples of typical age-appropriate choral works or as model pieces to be analyzed. Her piece "Et In Terra Pax" appeared in Charles P. Brown's Range Vs. Register: An Important Distinction in Choral Repertoire for the Adolescent Male as an example of a typical elementary SAB piece. Lightfoot's "The Swing" was used as part of a sample choral lesson plan in Sally C. Brown's A Comparative Study of Current Practices of Selected University-Based Children's Chorus Directors in Relation to Arts Integration. Lightfoot's Lenten works were referenced in Lisa A. Elliott's Sacred Song Sisters: Choral and Solo Vocal Church Music by Women Composers for the Lenten Revised Common Lectionary. In Janet M. Hostetter's Tone Production, Musicianship Training, Repertoire Development, Performance Practice: A Pedagogical Overview of Selected International Children’s Choirs, Lightfoot is identified as a notable composer and influence in the educational choral space. Lightfoot's works are used as examples of typical children's choir pieces in Arneuka D. Jackson's A Descriptive Analysis of Multicultural Children’s Choir Octavos from Select U.S. Music Publishing Companies. In Kenneth C. Jeffs's Real Time Video Mentoring: Investigating Synchronous Video Technology as a Mentoring Tool for New Music Teachers in Rural School Districts, a participant mentioned how their use of Lightfoot's music lent the participant credibility among her colleagues. Jessica Nápoles's Critical Thinking in the Choral Rehearsal: An Initial Study of Approaches to Teacher Training used Lightfoot's "Something Told the Wild Geese" as a model piece in her choral teacher training study.

Lightfoot's works have also been analyzed in numerous choral reviews. Her piece, "This Shall be Music," was the subject of a review by Judith Carman where it was dubbed "tuneful" and noted for how well it would fit the adolescent voices it was written for. "Gloria Deo" was reviewed by Tim McCray where it was called "easy but exciting music." In her series of choral reviews, Sharon Gratto praised "The Arrow and the Song" highlighting specifically how the harmonies maintain the feeling of the text and the effectiveness of the piano line.

== Associations ==
Lightfoot is a member of numerous associations including the American Choral Directors Association (ACDA), the American Society of Composers, Authors, and Publishers (ASCAP), the Missouri Music Educators Association, the National Association for Music Education (NAfME), the Sigma Alpha Iota Music Fraternity, the Choristers Guild, and the P.E.O. Sisterhood.

== Awards ==
Lightfoot has received numerous awards throughout her career including the Outstanding Young Woman of America Award (1984), the Luther T. Spayde Award for Missouri Choral Conductor of the Year (1994), the Opus Award, awarded by the Missouri Choral Directors’ Association for an outstanding composition, for her piece entitled "The Rhodora" (2005), membership in the Odessa (MO) R-VII Public Foundation Hall of Fame (2015), and has received an annual ASCAP award for her compositions.
