= Glad Robinson Youse =

American classical composer

Gladys "Glad" Robinson Youse (1898 – 1985), was an American composer.

Born in Miami, Oklahoma, Gladys Robinson graduated from Stephens College in 1919 with a music degree, then studied composition with Tibor Serly in New York. She married Clare Youse and the couple settled in Baxter Springs, Kansas, where they raised their daughter, Madolyn (1924-2018), later Mrs. Babcock, who earned her AA degree in 1944 from Stephens College and a Masters of Science Degree in Analytical Chemistry from the University of Minnesota. Glad Robinson Youse was a member of ASCAP and served on the board of the Sigma Alpha Iota Foundation in 1971.

Youse composed sacred and secular music for solo voice, choir, and piano. Today, the National Federation of Music Clubs sponsors the biennial Glad Robinson Youse Adult Composers Contest, and Stephens College offers a Glad Robinson Youse Scholarship. The Competitions and Awards Division of the Texas Federation of Music Clubs has a Glad Robinson Youse Chair.

Her compositions (all with piano accompaniment) include:

- A Man Must Have a Song (men's choir)
- April is Forever (women's choir or soprano)
- "Arise My Love" (words from Song of Solomon; for solo voice)
- As Long as Children Pray (women's choir or soprano)
- "Beatitudes" (soprano)
- Behold, God is My Salvation (mixed choir)
- Bless Us, O God (women's choir)
- Glorious Easter Morning (mixed choir)
- "God's World" (for one or two unspecified voices)
- Great is Thy Mercy (mixed choir)
- He Who Believes in Me (mixed choir)
- Hear Me Lord (mixed choir or soprano)
- High Upon a Hilltop (women's choir)
- Hungry Pagan (mixed choir)
- "I Knelt at Thy Altar" (soprano)
- I Placed My Heart Within a Rose (mixed choir)
- In a Corner of My Heart (for unspecified voices)
- Let Us Smile (for children)
- "Little Lost Boy" (soprano)
- Lovely the Dawning (women's choir)
- "My Dream of Springtime" (soprano)
- My Heart is Ever Grateful (women's choir)
- O, it is Lovely, Lord (women's choir)
- Perhaps I May (women's choir)
- "Red Bird" (soprano)
- Ring Out Ye Bells! Sing Out Ye Voices! (mixed choir)
- Salute to America (mixed choir)
- So Near, So Dear (three sopranos)
- "Some Lovely Thing" (soprano)
- Song-Trip Around the World (for children)
- Thirty-Fourth Star (words by Isabel Doerr; for unspecified voices )
- This Nation Under God (mixed choir)
- "Thou wilt Light My Candle" (soprano)
- Why? (women's choir)
- Winds of the Prairie (women's choir)
- Wishing (women's choir)
- (The) World is About Me (for unspecified voices)
