= Bertha Weber =

American composer and organist

Bertha Anna Weber (March 31, 1887 – April 17, 1961) was an American composer and organist.

== Life and career ==
Weber was born in New Baden, Illinois, to John and Elizabeth Weber. The family moved to Pomona, California, in 1887. Weber studied music at Pomona College, the University of Southern California, and in Europe. She was an organist at Pomona First Presbyterian Church in 1907, and later at Trinity Methodist Church for a number of years. She moved to Berkeley and maintained a studio at the Hotel Claremont there from around 1924 until she moved to Oakland in 1947. She continued composing and giving music lessons and recitals until her death in 1961, when she committed suicide by stepping in front of a train. She was a member of the professional music fraternity Sigma Alpha Iota.

== Works ==
Weber's compositions were published by Willis Music Company. They include:

=== Opera ===
- The Mysterious Characters of Mr. Fu (1932)

=== Vocal ===
- "Abraham Lincoln"
- "Angels and Shepherds Song"
- "Lincoln So Brave and True"
