= Tibor Serly =

Hungarian musician

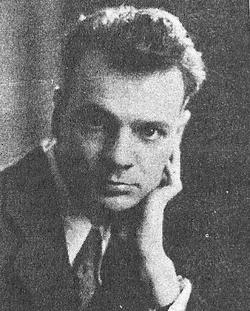
Tibor Serly

Tibor Serly (Hungarian pronunciation: [ˈtibor ˈʃɛrli]; Losonc, Kingdom of Hungary, 25 November 1901 – London, 8 October 1978) was a Hungarian violist, violinist, and composer.

== Life ==
Serly was the son of Lajos Serly, a pupil of Franz Liszt and a composer of songs and operettas in the last decades of the 19th century, who emigrated to America in 1905 with his family. Serly's first musical studies were with his father.

Spending much of his childhood in New York City, Serly played violin in various pit orchestras led by his father. In 1922, he returned to Hungary to attend the Franz Liszt Academy of Music in Budapest, where he studied composition with Zoltán Kodály, violin with Jenő Hubay, and orchestration with Leó Weiner. He greatly admired and became a young apprentice of Béla Bartók; Serly would go on to become one of Bartók's great champions, writing and lecturing about him and conducting and recording many of his works. For the most part, these efforts received praise, both by Bartók and by colleagues.

After graduating in 1925 with high honors in performance and composition, Serly returned to America, where he played viola with the Cincinnati Orchestra (1926–1927), Philadelphia Orchestra (1928–1935), and the NBC Orchestra (1937–1938). During these years, Serly formed close relationships with the poets Ezra Pound and Louis Zukofsky, who wrote a dedicatory poem to Serly, published in the avant-garde magazine Blues in February 1929.

During the years of 1940, 1949, 1955, and 1958, he conducted the Naumburg Orchestral Concerts, in the Naumburg Bandshell, Central Park, in the summer series.

When Bartók and his wife emigrated to America during World War II, Serly met them at the docks and provided support to them. After Bartók's death in 1945, the family turned to Serly to orchestrate the final seventeen measures of the Third Piano Concerto as well as the Viola Concerto, which took Serly more than two years to compile from sketches into a performable piece. It is now one of the most widely performed viola pieces. While working on this project, Serly composed the Rhapsody on Folk Songs Harmonized by Béla Bartók for Viola and Orchestra, which has become one of his most well-known compositions.

Serly taught composition at the Juilliard School and Manhattan School of Music in New York City (among other institutions) and was also a featured composer/conductor with the Danish Radio Orchestra. He taught orchestration to Carlyle W. Hall Sr., a trumpet player and arranger for Tommy Tucker's band; composer Glad Robinson Youse, and conductor/arranger/composer Mort Lindsey who worked with Judy Garland, Barbra Streisand, and Merv Griffin also studied with Serly.

In the course of rethinking the major developments in harmony found in the work of Stravinsky, Milhaud, Prokofiev, and Vaughan Williams as well as Bartók and other composers, Serly developed what he referred to as an enharmonicist musical language. In his book Modus Lascivus (1975) he explored a set of 82 basic tertian chords. Serly titled several of his later works as being "in modus lascivus", including sonatas for violin, viola, and piano. His Concertino 3 X 3 uses this compositional system, but is most memorable for its formal structure: it consists of nine movements, the first three for piano solo, the second set of three movements for orchestra without piano, and the final set combining the previous sets, played simultaneously.

In later life, Serly moved to Longview, Washington, with his second wife, the pianist Miriam Molin. He died at the age of seventy-six after being struck by a car in London.

== Works ==
- Symphony No. 2 in Two Movements for Woodwinds, Brass, and Percussion
- Rhapsody on Folk Songs Harmonized by Béla Bartók for Viola and Orchestra (1946–48)
- Concerto for Viola and Orchestra (1929)
- Concerto for Violin and Wind Symphony (1955–58)
- Concerto for Two Pianos and Orchestra (1958)
- Concerto for Trombone and Orchestra (1951)
- Piano Sonata No. 1 in "Modus Lascivus" (1946)
