= Joyce Grill =

American composer, teacher, and conductor

Joyce Grill (born April 20, 1936) is an American composer, teacher, and conductor.

== Biography ==
Grill graduated from the University of Wisconsin–Madison where she completed a BM in Music in 1958. She received training at the Fontainebleau School of Fine Arts in France, where she studied piano with Robert and Jean Casadesus and theory and composition with Nadia Boulanger.

She taught piano, music appreciation, and accompanying classes at the University of Wisconsin–La Crosse from 1974–1999 where she wrote the UW–La Crosse Fight Song.

She founded the La Crosse Area Music Teachers Association in 1980. Her first book Accompanying Basics was published in 1987 by KJOS. In 2006 she was named a MTNA Foundation Fellow. In 2010 she was the Wisconsin Music Teachers Association Commissioned Composer.

She is a member of Sigma Alpha Iota and has held offices in both the Wisconsin State Music Teachers Association and the National Music Teachers Association.

== Works ==
- "Accompanying Basics" (1987)
- "Christmas Together" (1989)
- "Ring Christmas Bells" (1991)
- "Song of the Wise Men" (1992)
- "O Holy Night" (1992)
- "From Many Lands: Nine original pieces in romantic Style" (1992)
- "Thanks Anna Magdalena" (1992)
- "Either Or: Pieces for right or left hand" (1992)
- "A Christmas Medley" (1993)
- "Journey of the Kings" (1993)
- "The Black Cat Boogies" (1993)
- "Character Pieces: Original pieces in the romantic style" (1993)
- "Just For Fun: Seven Jazzy Pieces for Not-so-serious Days" (1994)
- "Gypsy Airs" (1994)
- "From Many Lands at Christmas" (1995)
- "Left Alone Right On: 14 Original pieces for left hand alone or right hand alone" (1995)
- "More Left Alone Right On: Original pieces for left hand alone or right hand alone" (1996)
- "Criss-Crossing" (1997)
- "Preludes: ten original pieces in the romantic style" (1997)
- "Accompanist: yes, it really happened" (1997)
- "Duets from Many Lands: six original pieces for one piano, four hands" (1998)
- "Movin’ On" (2000)
- "In Character" (2000)
- "Remembering" (2000)
- "In Style" (2002)
- "Country Scenes" (2002)
- "Four-hand fun: original piano duets for early-intermediate pianists" (2002)
- "Four Hand Fun, Book 2" (2002)
- "Left alone—Right on!: 14 original pieces for left hand alone or right hand alone" (2003)
- "Random Thoughts: 11 original Piano Solos" (2003)
- "Changing Moods" (2003)
- "Three's A Crowd Rag" (2003)
- "Sparklers" (2003)
- "Down the Road" (2004)
- "In Style, Bk2" (2005)
- "Cancun cha-cha-cha: one piano, six hands—early intermediate." (2005)
- "He Is Born" (2006)
- "Dancing Drums" (2006)
- "Snapshots of Wisconsin Suite" (2006)
- "Minnesota Moments Suite" (2006)
- "Who's Next Trio" (2007)
- "Desert Caravan" (2008)
- "Spanish Nights" (2009)
- "Chopsticks Rag for Three" (2009)
- "Broken Record Rag" (2010)
