= Susan Cohn Lackman =

American composer and academic

Susan Cohn Lackman (born 1948) is an American composer of contemporary classical music. She is a professor of music theory and composition at Rollins College, in Winter Park, Florida, where she has taught classes in harmony, counterpoint, Jewish music, music business, arts administration, Russian music, music criticism, and music history.

== Life ==
Lackman was born on 1 July 1948 in Qingdao in China. She was the daughter of an officer in the U.S. Navy, from an early age she traveled the world, absorbing music and art from many cultures. She holds a B.Mus.Ed. degree from Temple University, an M.A. from The American University, and a Ph.D. from Rutgers University.

She is active in arts management, and received an M.B.A. from the Crummer Graduate School of Business at Rollins. She has served as general manager of WPRK-FM, treasurer of the International Alliance for Women in Music, and executive director and board of directors chair of Florida's Festival of Orchestras. In 2010 she was named director of the composers bureau for Sigma Alpha Iota.
