= Roberta Bitgood =

American classical composer

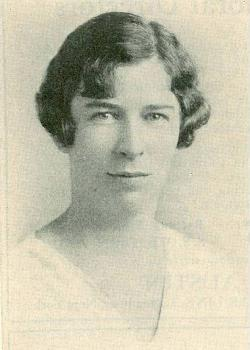
Roberta Bitgood

Roberta Bitgood (Wiersma) (15 January 1908 – 15 April 2007) was an American organist, choir director, and composer. She was a pioneer of 20th-century American church music, and the first woman to serve as national president of the American Guild of Organists.

== Early life and education ==
Roberta Bitgood was born in New London, Connecticut, to Grace Robinson Prentis and Robert A.T. Bitgood. She showed an early talent for music, and started violin lessons at the age five. From 1920-1924, she studied at the Williams Memorial Institute. While at Williams, she served as concert master and assistant conductor for her school orchestra. At age fifteen she began taking organ lessons over the summers, and subsequently started performing at local churches. Bitgood attended Connecticut College for Women, studying music with a major focused in violin and organ performance. She graduated with honors in 1928, and continued her studies in New York City at the Guilmant Organ School. Bitgood won a $500 scholarship to attend the school, and, while there, worked with the founder William C. Carl. During her time at Guilmant, she also completed her Associate and Fellowship exams with the American Guild of Organists (AGO). Bitgood earned the highest mark in the country that year on her Fellowship exam, and graduated with a Gold Medal for top honors from Guilmant that spring in 1930. She went on to receive a master's degree in music education from the Teacher's College at Columbia University in 1932, and a master's and doctoral degree in sacred music from Union Theological Seminary in 1935 and 1945 after studying with Clarence Dickinson and David Williams. Bitgood was the first woman, and twelfth individual in America to receive a doctorate in sacred music.

== Career ==
After finishing her education, she married Jacob Gijsbert Wiersma, and later had a daughter Grace (who earned a doctorate in 1990 for a study of the Bai language). Bitgood's career started out of Bloomfield, New Jersey, where she lived from 1932 to 1947. She played organ for a number of churches and synagogs, worked at the Bloomfield College and Seminary, served as the Director of Music for the official chorus of the State Federation of Women's Clubs, and formed Glee Clubs at the local YMCA and YWCA. In 1939 she was a featured organ recitalist at the Temple of Religion at the New York World's Fair. From 1947 to 1952 she worked as the organist and music director for the Holy Trinity Lutheran Church in Buffalo, New York. After leaving Holy Trinity, Bitgood and her family moved to Riverside, California, where she was the music director for Calvary Presbyterian Church. In 1964, she relocated to Michigan, where she played viola with the Battle Creek Symphony Orchestra and worked as the organist for the First Congregational Church, also in Battle Creek. While in Michigan, she also maintained membership on both the National Council of the AGO and the National Board of Directors of the Choristers Guild. In 1975, she was elected by write-in to serve as the President of the AGO. Bitgood became the first female President of the AGO, and was elected alongside Vice President Ruth Milliken of Norwalk, Connecticut, and Secretary Barbara F. Mount of Freehold Township, New Jersey. As a result, 1975 saw the largest number of women to serve in top positions for the AGO, as well as the first three non-New York based members elected to national leadership.

== Retirement ==
Officially retiring in 1976, Bitgood returned to Connecticut, where she continued to work for 18 years as an organist in local churches and synagogues. By 1981, she was living in the village of Quaker Hill, Connecticut, and worked for the United Methodist Church of New London. She accepted the position of organist, choir and music director for Waterford United Presbyterian in 1984. The church ran out of Mary Harkness Chapel on the Connecticut College campus until 1989, when it moved to its own location in Waterford, Connecticut. She continued work in the area until her death in 2007.

== Awards and recognition ==
The Roberta Bitgood Organ Scholarship was created in 1993 by the American Guild of Organists, New London County Chapter.^{[4]} Bitgood received the William C. Carl Medal in 1930, and the Connecticut College Medal in 1974, becoming the first graduate with a music degree to do so.

== Works ==
Bitgood was known for sacred music, anthems, cantatas and hymns. She studied composition throughout her entire secondary education career. First published in 1935, many of her works were published by H.W. Grey & Co., for whom she was also a publishing editor. From 1966 to 1975 Bitgood was nominated annually for an American Society of Composers, Authors and Publishers (ASCAP) award. A selection of her works include:

=== SS and SA works ===
- Once There Was a Garden Fair (1950)
- Holy Spirit, Hear Us (1959)
- Lord, Guide Our Thoughts (1963)
- Bring a Torch (French, with flute) (1967)

=== SATB works ===
- The Greatest Of These Is Love (1936)
- The Christmas Candle (1937)
- God Himself Is With Us (1941)
- Christ Went Up Into the Hills Alone (1946)
- Be Still and Know That I Am God (1952)
- Except the Lord Build the House (1957)
- Alle Gioie Pastors (Shepards, Come) (1963)
- They Shall Walk (1966)
- The Power of Music (1972)
- Let us Witness Together

=== Cantatas ===
- Job (SATB) (1948)
- Joseph (SATB) (1966)
- Let There Be Light (SS) (1965)

=== Unison and solo works ===
- That Eastertide With Joy Was Bright (1959)
- Wise Men, Seeking Jesus (with flute) (1960)
- Psalm 92 (It Is Good To Give Thanks) (1965)
- Allelujah, Christ is Risen (1967)
- We Come With Songs of Gladness (1968)
- Be Still and Know That I Am God (Solo) (1941)
- The Greatest Of These Is Love (Solo) (1936, renewed 1964)

=== Response book ===
- Altogether Joyfully Sing (1971)

=== Organ music ===
- At Eventide
- Choral Prelude on God Himself Is With Us (St. Cecilia Series 793) (H.W. Gray)
- Choral Prelude on Jewels (St. Cecilia Series 746) (H.W. Gray)
- Choral Prelude on O Master, Let Me Walk (Sacred Music Press)
- Choral Prelude on Siloam (St. Cecilia Series 778) (H.W. Gray)
- Noel (Carol of the Birds) (H.W. Gray)
- Choral Prelude on "Covenanters' Tune" (Flammer 1958)
- On An Ancient Alleluia (St. Cecilia Series 894) (H. W. Gray 1962)
- Offertories From Afar (seven short pieces based on folk melodies) (1964)
- Postlude On An Old Spanish Hymn (Madrid) (Sacred Music Press 1966)
- Rejoice, Give Thanks (with four brass) (1971)
- Meditation on Kingfold (1976)
- Organ Album, collection (1991)

Her works have been recorded and issued on media, including:

- Women Composer For Organ-Music Spanning Five Centuries Audio CD (October 24, 2006) Gasparo Records, ASIN: B000025YJO
- Music She Wrote Audio CD (July 31, 2001) Raven Records, ASIN: B00005NF8G
