= Otello (Toscanini recording) =

LP release as RCA Victor LM 6107, 1953

The 1947 recording of Verdi's Otello by Arturo Toscanini and the NBC Symphony Orchestra and chorus is regarded as one of the most notable early Verdi opera recordings. The role of Otello was sung by Ramón Vinay, Desdemona by Herva Nelli, and Iago by Giuseppe Valdengo, and Cassio by tenor Virginio Assandri.

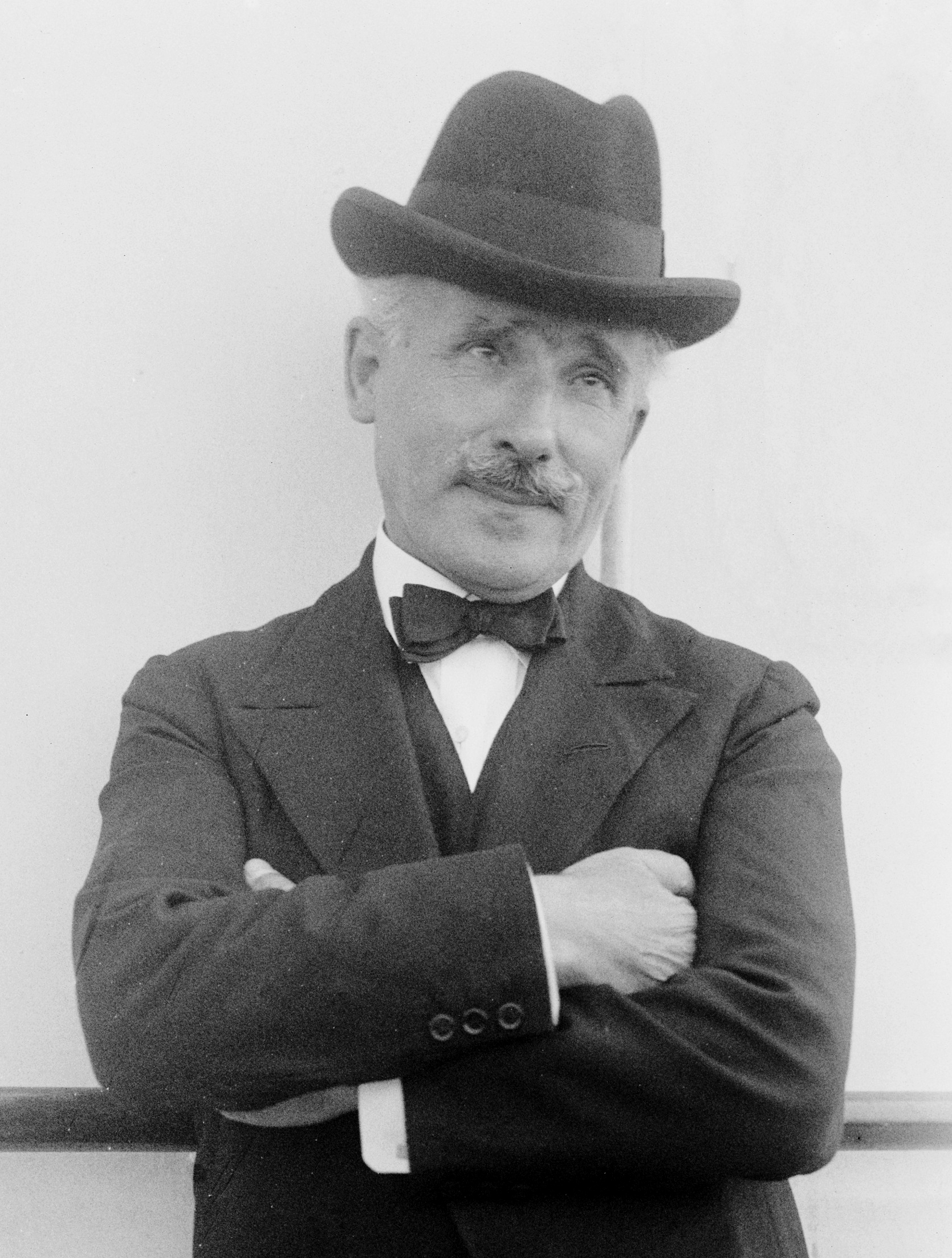
Arturo Toscanini

The recording was made from NBC broadcast performances recorded in Studio 8H, New York City on 6 and 13 December 1947. Rehearsals on 4 and 5 December preceded the first recording session, and a third rehearsal on the 12th preceded the second session. The names of NBC's producer and balance engineer are unknown. As far as the original broadcast, much of NBC's network did not hear the full opera as intended. While NBC in New York moved sponsor Ford Motor company's advertisements into after the 6:30 evening meal slot, giving the extra fifteen minutes needed from 6:15 to the 6:30 to allow the full broadcast of the first half of the opera many affiliates either did not carry the broadcasts or filled the slot with the Answer Man programme.
