= Markella Hatziano =

Greek opera singer (born 1960)

- Μαρκέλλα Χατζιάνο
- Born: 1960 (age 65–66); Athens, Greece
- Education: Greek National Conservatoire
- Occupations: Mezzo-soprano; painter
- Years active: 1983–present
- Style: Opera
- Website: www.markella.com

Markella Hatziano (Greek: Μαρκέλλα Χατζιάνο; born 1960 in Athens, Greece) is an operatic mezzo-soprano.

== Early life, education and debut ==
Hatziano entered the Greek National Conservatoire at the age of 12 as a scholarship student. She studied with Georgia Georgilopoulou, graduating summa cum laude at age 17. She studied repertoire and interpretation with baritone Tito Gobbi for three years. She came to international attention as the second-place finalist in the BBC Cardiff Singer of the World competition and the winner of the first Tito Gobbi International Competition. Shortly after graduation, Hatziano made her very early professional debut with the Oxford Symphony Orchestra at the Odeon of Herodes Atticus in Athens. Her operatic debut took place at the Greek National Opera at age 23 performing as Princess Eboli in Verdi's Don Carlos.

== International career ==
Hatziano debuted on the international stage as Suzuki in Puccini's Madama Butterfly with the Opera Company of Boston conducted by Sarah Caldwell, Neris in Médée by Luigi Cherubini, Amneris in Aida, as soloist in Verdi's Requiem, and at the Sofia Opera as Azucena in Verdi's Il trovatore. She gained great international recognition in December 1993 when she performed on short notice the role of Didon in Les Troyens, by Hector Berlioz, in highly praised concert performances at the Barbican Centre with the London Symphony Orchestra under Colin Davis.

She has performed the roles of Dalila (Samson and Dalila by Camille Saint-Saëns), Amneris (Aida by Verdi), Eboli (Don Carlos by Verdi), Azucena (Il trovatore by Verdi), Didon (Les Troyens by Berlioz), Marguerite (La Damnation de Faust by Berlioz), Charlotte (Werther by Jules Massenet), Santuzza (Cavalleria rusticana by Pietro Mascagni) and Judith (Bluebeard's Castle by Béla Bartók) at many of the world's most prestigious opera houses and festivals, including the Royal Opera House, La Scala, Liceu, Teatro Real, San Francisco Opera, Berlin State Opera, Teatro Colón, Wiener Musikverein, Royal Albert Hall, Tanglewood Music Festival, Maggio Musicale Fiorentino, Salzburg Festival and the Ancient Theatre of Epidaurus.

She has appeared with many of the world's top symphony orchestras, including the Vienna Philharmonic, New York Philharmonic, Boston Symphony Orchestra, Chicago Symphony Orchestra, Los Angeles Philharmonic, BBC Symphony Orchestra, Mozarteum Orchestra Salzburg, Royal Philharmonic Orchestra, Staatskapelle Berlin, Oslo Philharmonic, and the RAI National Symphony Orchestra, as well as the two Greek state orchestras – the Athens State Orchestra and the Thessaloniki State Symphony Orchestra – performing works by Verdi, Chausson, Ravel, Berlioz, Beethoven and Mahler.

She has collaborated with many world-renowned opera singers, such as José Carreras, Jessye Norman, Montserrat Caballé, Shirley Verrett, José Cura, Josephine Barstow, Gwyneth Jones, Robert Hale, Simon Estes, Dmitri Hvorostovsky, stage directors Robert Wilson and Franco Zeffirelli, conductors Daniel Barenboim, Christoph von Dohnányi, Zubin Mehta, Bernard Haitink, Michel Plasson, Esa-Pekka Salonen, Seiji Ozawa, Kent Nagano, and Mariss Jansons, among others, and the Greek composers Mikis Theodorakis, Vangelis and Eleni Karaindrou.

Her collaboration with Vangelis includes her participation in his 1988 studio album Direct on the track "Glorianna" (Hymn a la Femme), where she sings both the soprano and the mezzo-soprano parts; her appearance at the "Eureka" concert in Rotterdam on 18 June 1991, organized by the Dutch Ministry of Economic Affairs; her performance as Antigone in his homonymous short opera's concert version during "The Night of Poetry" event held on 3 October 1991, at the Odeon of Herodes Atticus; and her performance in the world premiere of Mythodea held on 13 July 13 1993, also at the Odeon of Herodes Atticus.

== Recordings ==
- Manolis Kalomiris: Symphony No. 2 "Of the Good and Simple People" | Soloist: Markella Hatziano, mezzo-soprano | The Orchestra & Choir of the Bulgarian Radio & Television conducted by Byron Fidetzis (Label: Concert Athens, 1986)
- Manolis Kalomiris: Evening Legends Song Cycles A & B | Markella Hatziano (mezzo-soprano), Danae Kara (piano) (Label: Concert Athens, 1987)
- Manolis Kalomiris: Oblivion | Markella Hatziano (mezzo-soprano) | Aris Garoufalis (piano), Tatsis Apostolidis (violin), Ersi Kaguelari (violin), Yannis Vatikiotis (viola), Telis Katsikakis (cello) (Label: Concert Athens, 1987)
- Giuseppe Verdi: Messa da Requiem | Michèle Crider (soprano), Markella Hatziano (mezzo-soprano), Gabriel Sadé (tenor), Robert Lloyd (bass) | London Symphony Orchestra and Chorus conducted by Richard Hickox (Label: Chandos Records, 1996)
- Ernest Bloch: Macbeth | Jean-Philippe Lafont, baritone (Macbeth) and Markella Hatziano, mezzo-soprano (Lady Macbeth) | Orchestre Philharmonique de Montpellier Languedoc-Roussillon & Choeur de la Radio Lettone conducted by Friedemann Layer (Live recording, 26 July 1999 – Festival de Radio France et Montpellier – label: Actes Sud, 1999. This was awarded the Grand Prix de l'Académie Charles Cros)
- Hatziano sings Liszt (13 songs by Franz Liszt) | Markella Hatziano (mezzo-soprano), Steve Larson (piano) (Label: Classical Masterworks, 2010)

As guest artist

- Vangelis: Direct (track: "Glorianna (Hymn a la Femme)" performed by Markella Hatziano, mezzo-soprano (Labels: Arista Records, 1988 – Esoteric Recordings, 2013)
- Eleni Karaindrou: Music and Songs for the Theatre (Label: Mikri Arktos, 2015)

== Visual arts career ==
Hatziano is also a painter. The use of colors in multiple levels on large-scale wooden surfaces is the distinctive style of her artwork.
