= Carlo Cossutta =

Italian opera singer

Carlo Cossutta (Slovene: Karlo Košuta; May 8, 1932 – January 22, 2000) was a prominent Italian dramatic tenor of Slovene descent who had a major international opera career from the mid-1950s through the late 1990s. He began and ended his career at the Teatro Colón in Buenos Aires where he sang regularly from 1958 through 1998. He first drew international attention in 1964 when he sang the title role in the world premiere of Alberto Ginastera's Don Rodrigo, which led to a series of appearances at the Royal Opera, London during the 1960s. In the 1970s his international career skyrocketed with appearances at most of the major opera houses in Europe and the United States. He remained active on the international stage during the 1980s but his career slowed down significantly in the 1990s after he contracted liver cancer.

Cossutta had a powerful voice, buttressed by a solid technique and exceptional stamina. He excelled in the dramatic and spinto tenor repertoire, and was particularly successful in the operas of Giuseppe Verdi. He was especially renowned for his performances of the title role in Verdi's Otello and the role of Pollione in Bellini's Norma. Although his performance credits place him among the leading tenors of his generation, he never reached the star status of his early contemporaries such as Franco Corelli and Mario del Monaco, or later ones like Plácido Domingo and Luciano Pavarotti.

== Biography ==
=== Early life and career ===
Born in Santa Croce (Slovene: Križ) near Trieste (Slovene: Trst), Italy, in a Slovene family. After finishing two years of Slovene-language high school in Trieste, he emigrated to Argentina in 1948 where he initially worked as a furniture carpenter with his uncle, Angelo Hrovatin. After discovering his vocal capabilities he studied singing under Manfredo Miselli, Mario Melani, and Arturo Wolken in Buenos Aires. He made his professional opera debut in 1956 at a small Argentine theatre as Alfredo in Verdi's La traviata. His first performance of note came two years later when he appeared for the first time at the Teatro Colón as Cassio in Verdi's Otello in 1958. He sang regularly at that house for the next four decades, initially in mainly supporting roles. Notable early appearances at the Teatro Colón include Edgardo in Lucia di Lammermoor (1959), Mario Cavaradossi in Tosca (1962), and Rodolfo in La bohème (1963).

=== Rise to international success ===
The year 1964 proved to be a milestone in Cossutta's career. It marked the beginning of his reigning years at the Teatro Colón where he portrayed four roles in 1964: the title role in the world premiere of Alberto Ginastera's Don Rodrigo, Gabriele Adorno in Verdi's Simon Boccanegra, Kalaf in Ferruccio Busoni's Turandot, and the title role in "Oedipus Rex" (Stravinsky). That same year he launched his international opera career, making his European debut in London with the Royal Opera, Covent Garden as the Duke of Mantua in a lauded production of Verdi's Rigoletto.

From 1965 to 1970 Cossutta was the Teatro Colón's principal dramatic tenor, singing such diverse roles as Alfredo, Enzo Grimaldo in Ponchielli's La Gioconda, Jason in Luigi Cherubini's Médée, Ottone in Claudio Monteverdi's L'incoronazione di Poppea, Pinkerton in Puccini's Madama Butterfly, Riccardo in Verdi's Un ballo in maschera, and Foresto in Verdi's Attila among others. During this time his international career continued. He made his American debut with the Lyric Opera of Chicago on October 4, 1963 in the role of Abdallo in Verdi's Nabucco and in that season also sang Cassio in Otello and Walter in Tannhauser. He returned to Chicago in 1966 as Dimitri in Boris Godunov, Don Carlo in 1971, Gabriele Adorno in Simon Boccanegra in 1974, Otello in 1975, Dick Johnson in La Fanciulla del West in 1978 and Samson in 1981. He returned to Covent Garden in 1965 to sing Turiddu in Pietro Mascagni's Cavalleria rusticana and again in 1968 to portray the title hero in Verdi's Don Carlos. His debut at Vienna State Opera came in 1966 as Cavaradossi in Puccini's Tosca, and over the next 25 years he continued to appear there in more than 130 performances, including even the role of Froh in Richard Wagner's Rheingold. In 1970 he appeared as the tenor soloist in a production of Verdi's Requiem with the Chicago Symphony Orchestra.

After 1970 Cossutta's international career blossomed. He continued to appear at the Teatro Colón regularly through 1998 but with less frequency than in the 1960s as his international career became more important. On January 6, 1971, he made his debut at the Deutsche Oper Berlin singing Alfredo to Beverly Sills's Violetta. In the 1971-1972 season, Cossutta made his debuts at La Scala, the Teatro Lirico Giuseppe Verdi, the Festival dei Due Mondi, and the Opéra National de Paris. On September 23, 1972, he made his first appearance at the San Francisco Opera singing Radames in Verdi's Aida. On February 17, 1973, Cossutta made his debut at the Metropolitan Opera in New York City singing Pollione in Bellini's Norma with Montserrat Caballé in the title part, Fiorenza Cossotto as Adalgisa, Giorgio Tozzi as Oroveso, Charles Anthony as Flavio, and conductor Carlo Felice Cillario. In the August 1973 he made his first appearance at the Arena di Verona Festival, returning there again in the summer of 1974. He sang the title role in Verdi's Otello for the first time at Covent Garden in 1974, a role which became one of his signature parts during the next decade. He also made his Moscow debut that year as Radames during a European tour with La Scala.

In 1975 Cossutta sang Manrico in Verdi's Il trovatore at the Palais Garnier, returning there in 1979 to sing Ismaele in Verdi's Nabucco, both with Viorica Cortez. In 1977, Cossutta took part in a highly lauded complete recording of Otello with Margaret Price as Desdemona, Gabriel Bacquier as Iago, and Sir Georg Solti conducting the Vienna Philharmonic Orchestra. That same year he made the first of many appearances at the Hamburg State Opera where he was a regular guest through the end of his career. In 1978 Cossutta substituted for the younger tenor Plácido Domingo in a San Francisco Opera performance of Otello; Domingo returned the favor some years later in 1983. In 1979 Cossutta returned to the Met to sing Pollione again, this time to Shirley Verrett's Norma.

=== Later life and career ===
During the 1980s and 1990s Cossutta continued to appear in operas around the world, although his career slowed down considerably as he began to battle liver cancer. He had a number of successes with the role of Samson in Camille Saint-Saëns's Samson et Dalila which he first performed at the Teatro Lirico Giuseppe Verdi in 1982. He notably recorded the role live at the Bregenz Festival in 1988. His last performance of the part was in Hamburg in 1996. Other notable appearances during these years included a 1986 performance of Don Alvaro in La forza del destino at the San Francisco Opera and 1991 performances of Manrico at the Opéra Bastille and the Hamburg State Opera. He also sang the roles of Samson and Canio at the Vienna State Opera in 1991.

Cossutta retired from the opera stage in 1998 after making his final appearance at the Teatro Colón as Macduff in Verdi's Macbeth. He died in Udine.

== Selected recordings ==
- De Falla - La vida breve - Victoria de los Ángeles, Carlo Cossutta, Juan de Andia, Ana Maria Higueras, Jose Maria Higuero, Gabriel Moreno, Victor de Narké, Ines Rivadeneyra, Luis Villarejo - Spanish National Orchestra, Rafael Frühbeck de Burgos
- Puccini - Tosca - Sena Jurinac, Carlo Cossutta, Erich Kunz, Hans Hotter - Vienna State Opera Orchestra and Chorus, André Cluytens.
- Verdi - Otello - Carlo Cossutta, Margaret Price, Gabriel Bacquier, Kurt Equiluz, Peter Dvorský, Stafford Dean, Hans Helm, Jane Berbié, Kurt Moll - Vienna State Opera Orchestra and Chorus, Sir Georg Solti.
- Verdi - Il Trovatore - Carlo Cossutta, Gilda Cruz-Romo, Fiorenza Cossotto, Matteo Manuguerra, Agostino Ferrin - Coro e Orchestra del Maggio Musicale Fiorentino, Riccardo Muti.
- Verdi - Requiem - Mirella Freni, Christa Ludwig, Carlo Cossutta, Nicolai Ghiaurov - Berlin Philharmonic, Herbert von Karajan.

== Bibliography ==
Carlo Cossutta, un tenore venuto dal Carso / a tenor from Carso, 2010, Trieste, Comunicarte Edizioni (English & Italian text with a CD)
