= Neil Howlett =

British opera singer (1934–2020)

Neil Howlett (24 July 1934 – 21 May 2020) was an English operatic baritone who sang leading roles in major opera houses and festivals in the UK and abroad, including the Royal Opera House, Teatro Colón, and the English National Opera, where he was the Principal Baritone for seventeen years. Described by John Steane as "a vibrant voice somewhat in the Amato/Franci line", Howlett's repertoire included over 80 roles.

== Biography ==
Howlett was born in Mitcham and was educated at St Paul's Cathedral School and King's College, Cambridge followed by further studies at the Hochschule für Musik in Stuttgart. In 1957, while still at Cambridge, he won the Kathleen Ferrier Award, and in 1964 made his debut in the world premiere performance of Benjamin Britten's Curlew River.

The peak of his career was the seventeen years he spent as principal baritone with the English National Opera, where he created the role of The Mirador in Gordon Crosse's The Story of Vasco (1974) and the title role in David Blake's Toussaint (1977). His wide range of repertoire included the heaviest Verdi and Puccini roles, especially Iago in Otello and Scarpia in Tosca, and many Heldenbaritone roles, such as Amfortas in Parsifal and Jokanaan in Salome. Late in his career he also sang Wotan/Wanderer in Wagner's Ring cycle. Amongst his other roles were Prince Andrei in Prokofiev's War and Peace and Golaud in Pelléas et Mélisande.

Howlett was a professor at the Guildhall School of Music, and later, after retiring from full-time performance, Head of Vocal Studies at the Royal Northern College of Music. He taught privately in London and Lincolnshire.

Howlett died on 21 May 2020, aged 85.

== Recordings and broadcasts ==
Howlett's recordings include:

- Strauss: Salome – Montserrat Caballé (Salome), Sherill Milnes (Jokanaan), Regina Resnik (Herodias), Richard Lewis (Herod), James King (Narraboth), Michael Rippon (First Nazarene), Neil Howlett (First Soldier), Kenneth MacDonald (First Jew); London Symphony Orchestra; Erich Leinsdorf (conductor). Studio recording, London 1968. Label: RCA/Sony CD
- Verdi: Otello – Charles Craig (Otello), Rosalind Plowright (Desdemona), Neil Howlett (Iago), Shelagh Squires (Emilia), Bonaventura Bottone (Cassio); English National Opera Orchestra and Chorus; Mark Elder (conductor). Live recording, London 1983; remastered release 2001. Label: Chandos Records CD
- Stravinsky: Le rossignol – Phyllis Bryn Julson (The Nightingale), Neil Howlett (The Emperor), Felicity Palmer (The Cook), Elizabeth Laurence (Death), Michael George (The Bonze), Ian Caley (The Fisherman), John Tomlinson (The Chamberlain), BBC Singers and BBC Symphony Orchestra; Pierre Boulez (conductor). Label: Erato Disques CD
- Chabrier: Le roi malgré lui – Henri Gui (Henri de Valois), André Mallabrera (Comte de Nangis), Odile Pieti (Minka), Christiane Stutzman (Alexina), Neil Howlett (Laski), Michel Trempont (Fritelli); BBC Northern Singers and the BBC Northern Symphony Orchestra; Manuel Rosenthal (conductor). BBC broadcast, 1975.
- Gilbert & Sullivan: Princess Ida - Nan Christie (Princess Ida), Anne Collins (Lady Blanche), Josephine Gordon (Lady Psyche), Claire Powell (Melissa), Neil Howlett (King Hildebrand), Laurence Dale (Hilarion), Bernard Dickerson (Cyril), Richard Jackson (Florian), Frank Gorshin (King Gama); Ambrosian Opera Chorus, London Symphony Orchestra, Alexander Faris (conductor). DVD
- Britten: Gloriana – Sarah Walker (Queen Elizabeth I), Anthony Rolfe Johnson (Earl of Essex), Jean Rigby (Countess of Essex), Neil Howlett (Lord Mountjoy), Alan Opie (Sir Robert Cecil), Elizabeth Vaughan (Lady Rich), Richard Van Allan (Sir Walter Raleigh), Malcolm Donnelly (Henry Cuffe); English National Opera Chorus and Orchestra; Mark Elder (conductor). Live recording, London 1984 (also broadcast on the BBC). Label: ArtHaus Musik DVD

== Sources ==
- Blyth, Alan, "Review: Gloriana", Gramophone, December 2006.
- Cariaga, Daniel, "Long Beach Successfully Stages Difficult 'Pelleas'", Los Angeles Times, 26 April 1991
- Chandos Records, Liner Notes: Otello, CHAN 3068, 2001.
- Cummings, David M. (ed.), "Howlett, Neil", International Who's Who in Music, Routledge, 2000 p. 268. ISBN 0-948875-53-4
- Henahan, Donal, "A British 'War and Peace'", New York Times, 29 June 1984
- Kathleen Ferrier Awards, List of Winners
- Steane, J. B., "Review: Luciano Pavarotti: Operatic Arias, Gramophone, December 1980
