= Ina Bourskaya =

Ukrainian-born American opera singer (1886–1954)

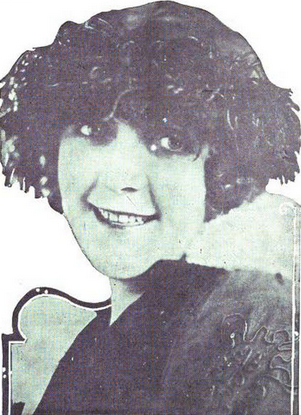
Ina Bourskaya, from a 1922 publication.

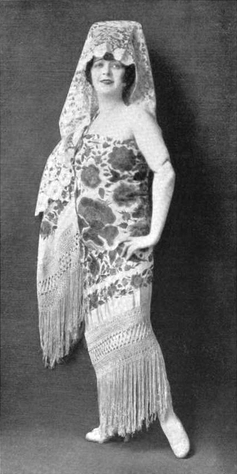
Ina Bourskaya as Carmen, from a 1922 publication.

Ina Bourskaya (September 9, 1886 — June 25, 1954) was a Ukrainian-born American opera singer.

== Early life ==
Ina Korzeniowska was born at Zhytomyr, Ukraine. Her parents, Joseph Korzeniowski and Teofilia Demlicka, were Polish.

== Career ==
Ina Bourskaya's opera debut was in 1913, in Romeo et Juliette. She arrived in the United States as a star of the Russian Opera Company, which toured internationally in Asia, showcasing Russian-trained singers and musicians, performing in Russian. She went to Chicago by 1922, first with the Russian Opera Company, then appearing as Amneris in the Chicago Civic Opera's production of Aida. She also sang at Chicago's Ravinia Festival every summer from 1922 to 1931. In 1927–1928, she spent a season with the Los Angeles Opera, and performed in three operas with the San Francisco Opera. From 1933 to 1937, she was a member of the San Carlo Opera Company.

Bourskaya left the Russian Opera Company to join the Metropolitan Opera in 1922. (She was replaced by Nina Koshetz). Bourskaya starred in Carmen many times with the Metropolitan Opera. While in New York, she performed at benefit concerts for the Veterans' Mountain Camp near Saranac, New York, and the Brooklyn Children's Fresh Air Association.

She appeared in a 1930 Vitaphone film short of the temple scene from Aida. In 1932, Bourskaya scoffed at opera singers' slimming regimens, saying "If the artists of today are truly to portray the works of the great masters, we must not diet, we must not roll on the floors, nor must we try to portray something the old masters knew nothing about."

She left the Metropolitan Opera after the 1936–1937 season. In the 1940s, Bourskaya used the name Ina Bours, and worked as a receptionist in Chicago, Illinois.

== Personal life ==
Ina Korzeniowska married Witold Bourski, a professor of language and philosophy, in 1908. She also had a longtime relationship with tenor Petr Skuba, who died in 1917. She became an American citizen in 1928, after first applying in 1923. She died in Chicago in 1954, aged 67 years.
