= Gilda Cruz-Romo =

Mexican soprano (1940–2025)

- Cruz-Romo in the 1960s
- Born: Gilda Cruz; February 12, 1940; Guadalajara, Jalisco, Mexico
- Died: June 28, 2025 (aged 85); San Antonio, Texas, U.S.
- Education: Mexico City Conservatory
- Occupation: Operatic soprano
- Organizations: Metropolitan Opera
- Spouse: Roberto Romo (m. 1967; died 2018)

Gilda Cruz-Romo (February 12, 1940 – June 28, 2025) was a Mexican operatic soprano, particularly associated with dramatic roles of the Italian repertory, performed throughout the United States and Europe. She first appeared at the Metropolitan Opera as Puccini's Madama Butterfly where she performed most of Verdi's leading ladies. She portrayed his Aida for her debuts at both the Royal Opera House in London and at La Scala in Milan, and at the Verona Arena.

== Life and career ==
Born Gilda Cruz in Guadalajara, Jalisco, on February 12, 1940, she studied at the Mexico City Conservatory with Ángel Esquivel. She sang with the choir of the Ballet Folklorico, touring to Central America, Europe and Asia. She performed as a soloist at the Palacio de Bellas Artes in Villa-Lobos' Bachianas Brasileiras with the National Symphony Orchestra conducted by Carlos Chávez. She made her debut on the opera stage in Mexico City on September 6, 1962, as Ortlinde in Wagner's Die Walküre, alongside Jon Vickers as Siegmund and conducted by Georges Sébastian.

=== United States ===
Cruz Romo's international career took off with her debut at the New York City Opera in 1969, as Margherita in Mefistofele, alongside Norman Treigle in the title role. She appeared at the Atlanta Opera in May 1970, as Maddalena in Giordano's Andrea Chénier, with Richard Tucker in the title role and conducted by Francesco Molinari-Pradelli.

She made her debut at the Metropolitan Opera (Met) in New York on December 18, 1970, in the title role of Puccini's Madama Butterfly. Her roles there included Nedda in Leoncavallo's Pagliacci, Verdi's title roles of both La traviata and Aida, Leonora in both Il trovatore and La forza del destino, Elisabetta in Don Carlo, Amelia in Un ballo in maschera and Desdemona in Otello and the title roles in Puccini's Manon Lescaut, Suor Angelica and Tosca.

When she portrayed Violetta, the title role of La traviata, in 1973, Peter G. Davies from the New York Times described her voice as "bright, gleaming" and "well‐focused", and noted that her "impersonation was refreshingly honest and free of prima‐donna mannerisms", in "a most touching characterization that often struck right to the heart of Verdi's heroine". Her Desdemona was seen in a "Live from the Met" telecast of Otello in 1979, with Plácido Domingo in the title role. She remained at the Met until 1984, appearing in 163 performances with the company. Cruz-Romo also appeared at the opera houses of Chicago, Houston, Dallas, San Francisco, New Orleans, Boston, Philadelphia, Baltimore, and others.

=== Europe ===
In Europe, she first appeared at the Royal Opera House in London in 1972 and at La Scala in Milan in 1973, both as Aida, regarded as her signature role. She appeared as Aida also at the Verona Arena. She toured with the ensemble of La Scala to the Bolshoi Theatre in Moscow in 1974. She scored a triumph as Luisa Miller in 1974, in a live performance with the RAI Torino, opposite Luciano Pavarotti and conducted by Peter Maag. She performed at the Rome Opera, La Fenice in Venice and the Maggio Musicale Fiorentino in Florence, among others.

Cruz-Romo appeared at the Vienna State Opera as Madama Butterfly, as Leonora in La forza del destino and as Luisa Miller. She also performed at the Liceo in Barcelona, the Teatro Nacional de São Carlos in Lisbon and the Palais Garnier in Paris.

=== Later years and death ===
During the 1988–89 season, Cruz-Romo added the role of Cherubini's Médée to her repertoire and in 1989, sang the role of Matilde in the American premiere of Mascagni's Silvano with New Jersey's Ars Musica conducted by Italo Marchini.

Cruz-Romo was very active in concert and recital as well. She did not make any commercial recordings, but live recordings of her best roles exist. She taught voice at the University of Texas at Austin and later lived with her husband Roberto Romo in San Antonio. Roberto died in 2018.

Cruz-Romo died in San Antonio, on June 28, 2025, aged 85.

== Recordings ==
- Verdi – Luisa Miller – Cruz-Romo, Luciano Pavarotti, Cristina Angelakova, Matteo Manuguerra, Raffaele Arié, Ferruccio Mazzoli – RAI National Symphony Orchestra and chorus, Peter Maag. OCLC 1115526118
- Verdi – Il trovatore – Cruz-Romo, Fiorenza Cossotto, Carlo Cossutta, Matteo Manuguerra, Agostino Ferrin – Coro e Orchestra del Maggio Musicale Fiorentino, Riccardo Muti. OCLC 183096879
