= Hermann Friedmann =

Polish-German philosopher

Adolph Friedmann
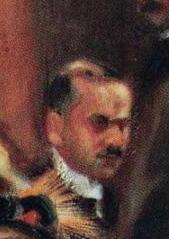
- Friedmann depicted at a party in 1915
- Born: 11 April 1873; Białystok
- Died: 25 May 1957 (aged 84); Heidelberg
- Occupation: Philosopher

Adolph Hermann Friedmann (11 April 1873 in Białystok – 25 May 1957 in Heidelberg) was a German philosopher and jurist, Finnish citizen from 1906. In Finland Friedmann became known to the general public as a lawyer. His most famous case was a murder committed in 1927 in Turku. Friedmann defended the head of the University Library of Åbo Akademi and his wife in a murder trial, which was extensively reported in the newspapers around Europe.

== Literary works ==
- Die Welt der Formen. System eines morphologischen Idealismus, Gebr. Paetel, Berlin 1925, C. H. Beck, München 1930
- Wissenschaft und Symbol. Aufriss einer symbolnahen Wissenschaft, Biederstein C. H. Beck), München 1949
- Sinnvolle Odysee. Geschichte eines Lebens und einer Zeit (1873–1950), C. H. Beck, München 1950

== See also ==
- International PEN
