= Charles Craig (tenor) =

British opera singer

Charles James Craig (3 December 1919 – 23 January 1997) was an English operatic tenor. In the army during World War II, he joined the Entertainments Unit in India and performed operatic arias. He was encouraged by Thomas Beecham, and was included on his 1952 recording of A Mass of Life

== Biography ==
Craig was born in Shoreditch, London on 3 December 1919. His father was labourer James George Craig and his mother Ann Rosina Gardner. He was youngest of fifteen siblings. Although he had musical leanings in his youth, both his parents died by the time he was thirteen, and in 1940 he joined the army.

During World War II, he performed operatic arias and ballads as part of the Entertainments Unit in India. He married Dorothy Wilson on 11 September 1946 in Bradford and they had 2 children. In retirement, he lived at Whitfield, Northamptonshire and on 23 January 1997, he died as a result of a heart attack.

== Career ==
Craig received early encouragement from Sir Thomas Beecham, and sang in his 1952 recording of A Mass of Life by Frederick Delius. He was known as one of "the most Italianate of English operatic tenors" and took lessons with Dino Borgioli. From 1957 to 1980 he performed leading tenor roles at London's Royal Opera House and English National Opera. One of his most famous roles was Verdi's Otello, which he sang in Chicago, Vienna, Berlin, Naples, Munich, Venice, Salzburg, Turin, Lisbon, Düsseldorf.

== Recordings ==
- Charles Craig - Puccini Arias and Favorite Ballads. Label: Testament 1151.
- Charles Craig - Operatic Arias and Italian Songs. Label: Testament 1152.
- Joan Hammond and Charles Craig Sing Opera Arias and Duets. Label: Testament 1153.
- Verdi: Otello – Charles Craig (Otello), Rosalind Plowright (Desdemona), Neil Howlett (Iago), Shelagh Squires (Emilia), Bonaventura Bottone (Cassio); English National Opera Orchestra and Chorus; Mark Elder (conductor). Live recording, London 1983; remastered release 2001. Label: Chandos Records CD

Charles Craig also recorded Il trovatore, The Land of Smiles, Un ballo in maschera, and The Student Prince (highlights).
