= Quaintance Eaton =

American historian (1901–1992)

- Eaton, from a 1957 book
- Born: Frances Quaintance Eaton; August 23, 1901; Kansas City, Missouri, U.S.
- Died: April 12, 1992 (aged 90)
- Occupations: Writer, opera historian

Quaintance Eaton (August 23, 1901 – April 12, 1992) was an American writer and arts administrator, author of several works on the history of opera.

== Early life ==
Frances Quaintance Eaton was born in Kansas City, Missouri, the daughter of Dudley Ward Eaton, a lawyer, and Madge (McAlister) Eaton. The name "Quaintance" was a family name. "My Quaker grandmother was named Bathsheeba Gidley Quaintance", she explained. "Fortunately I inherited only part of her name". She remembered enjoying opera recordings as a girl.

== Career ==
Eaton was a contributing editor at Opera News, and associate editor at Musical America. She also edited Quarter Notes, a publication of the New York City Opera. She was executive secretary of the National Council on the Arts and Government, and of the National Committee for the Musical Arts. She was also executive secretary of the National Federation of Music Clubs and a founder and board member of the New York City Opera Guild.

Eaton was given extensive access to rehearsals and opera company records in her research. "Even with all the opera I've seen," she explained in 1975, "it still fascinates me more than any other form of music." Books by Eaton include Musical U.S.A. (1949), Opera Caravan (1957), Opera Production: A Handbook (1961), The Boston Opera Company (1965), The Miracle of the Met (1968), Opera Production: A Handbook, Volume 2 (1974), Opera: A Pictorial Guide (1980), and Sutherland and Bonynge: An Intimate Biography (1987). She was a regular contributor to opera programming on radio, and wrote about the coming of opera to television.

Eaton was named a National Arts Associate by the music fraternity Sigma Alpha Iota for her "distinguished contributions to the arts". She spent the summers of 1971 and 1973 in Taos, New Mexico on grants from the Wurlitzer Foundation.

In 1974, she returned to Taos, after an extended tour in Australia, covering new productions at the Sydney Opera House.

== Personal life ==
Eaton was often described as a tall woman, and her wardrobe of handmade and unusual gowns and hats was also remarked upon. She died in 1992, in New York City, after a stroke. She was 90 years old. "Her textbooks on opera production have been indispensable and irreplaceable tools for opera professionals for decades," wrote Christopher Keene, general director of the New York City Opera, on the occasion. "Those privileged to know her will miss her indescribable vivacity and exceptional outlook on life. She was one of a kind."

A 1976 audio recording of her interviewing Joan Sutherland and Richard Bonynge for radio is archived in the National Library of Australia.
