= Aleksandrs Antoņenko =

Latvian tenor

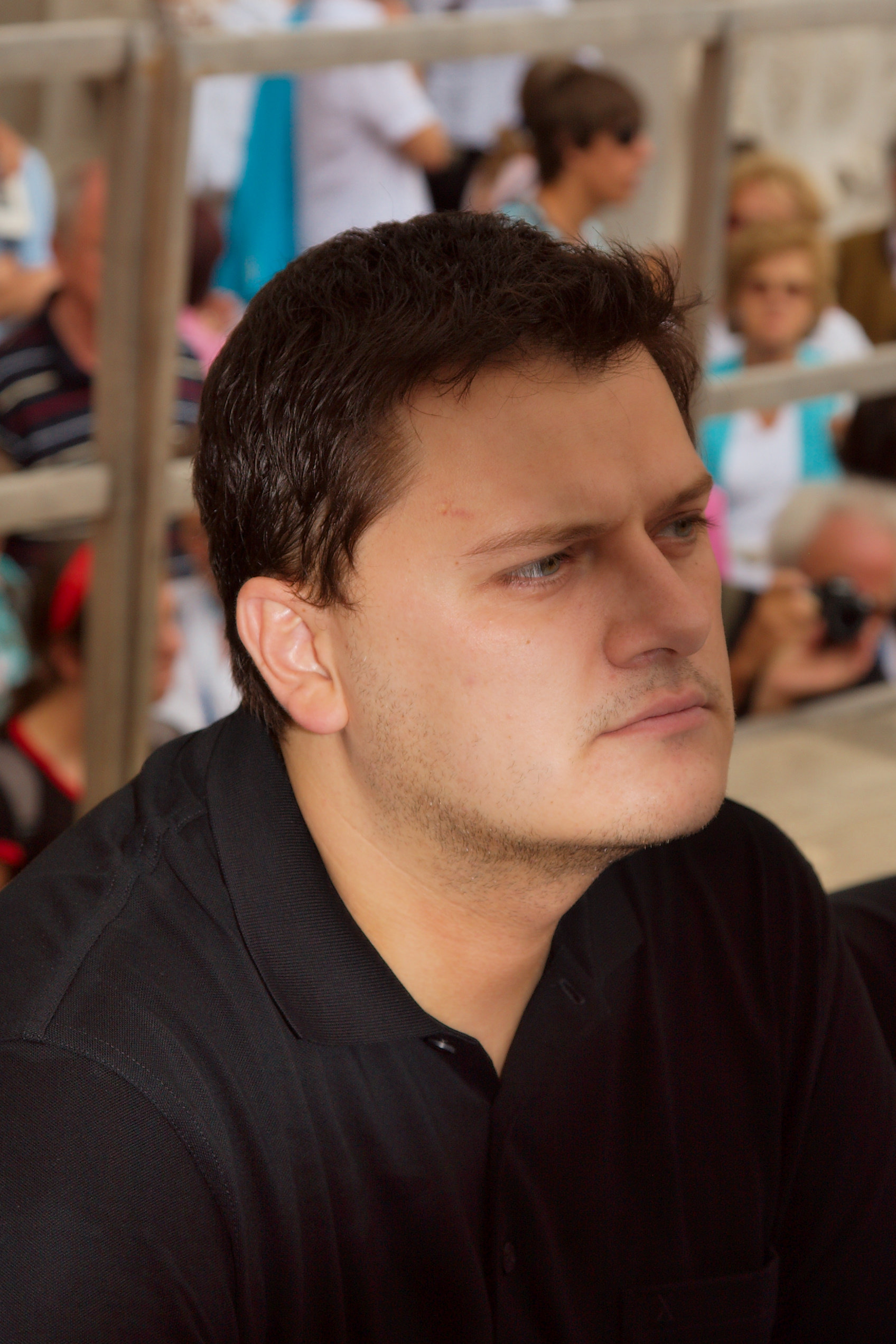
- Aleksandrs Antoņenko in 2008

Background information
- Born: 26 June 1975 (age 51); Riga, Latvian SSR
- Occupation: Opera singer (tenor)
- Years active: 1997–present

Aleksandrs Antoņenko (born 26 June 1975) is a Latvian tenor who specializes in the dramatic repertoire, and has appeared at the Metropolitan Opera and La Scala.

== Biography ==
Aleksandrs Antoņenko was born in Riga to a large family of Ukrainian immigrants. Already in childhood, he showed an aptitude for music.

In 1998, he graduated from the Latvian Academy of Music, in the class of wind instruments, and in parallel began vocal lessons under Margarita Gruzdeva. She identified him as a tenor, although many believed that the voice of Aleksandrs was a bass-baritone. Antoņenko considers his teacher as his "second mother" and continues to take lessons from her. He also studied at the vocal department of the Academy of Music in the class of Arvid Luste.

In 1997, he began singing in the choir of the Latvian National Opera. In 1998, he made his solo debut as Oberto in Handel's opera, Alcina.

Antoņenko works without an impresario, having only an Austrian agent.

== Career ==
Aleksandrs Antoņenko won the Paul Sacher Prize in 2002, and then a Great Music award 2004 at home, in Latvia, for opera productions and a performance of the Verdi Requiem.

In 2006, he made his debut as Chevalier des Grieux in Manon Lescaut at the Royal Swedish Opera and the Norwegian Opera, as well as at the Vienna State Opera.

In the season 2006–2007, the singer performed the role of Don José in the Norwegian State Opera (Oslo), Turiddu at the German Opera (Berlin) and the Monte Carlo Opera, and sang the role of Mario Cavaradossi at the festival in Baden-Baden.

The tenor has also sung the roles of Gabriel Adorno (Simon Boccanegra) at the Frankfurt Opera and Ismail in Nabucco at the Bavarian State Opera.

In the role of Otello, Antoņenko made his debut in the production conducted by Riccardo Muti at the Salzburg Festival in the summer of 2008. He then performed this role at the Rome Opera House.

He debuted on the stage of the Metropolitan Opera as the Prince in Rusalka in 2009, with Renée Fleming.

In 2010, he was seen as Hermann in The Queen of Spades and Otello at the Vienna State Opera, performed the role of Turiddu in Cavalleria rusticana in Valencia, and the Pretender in a new production of Boris Godunov at the Metropolitan Opera.

In 2011, Maestro Muti invited Antoņenko to perform Otello at the Opéra Garnier in Paris, accompanied by the Chicago Symphony Orchestra. He also appeared in a new production of Il tabarro at Covent Garden.

He continued his collaboration with the Swedish Royal Opera, where he took part in a new production of Puccini's La fanciulla del West.

Notable other appearances include a 2012 performance in Tosca, as Cavaradossi, at La Scala. In the same year, he was seen as Otello at the Royal Opera House in London.

In 2013, he appeared in the role of Radames in Aida at the Zurich Opera House. He followed that performance by appearing as Manrico in Il trovatore at the Berlin State Opera. He has also performed in Turandot as Calaf at La Scala. Also in 2013, he appeared in the role of Ismaele in Giuseppe Verdi's opera Nabucco, conducted by Nicola Luisotti at the Scala.

In 2014, he appeared in Cavalleria rusticana and Pagliacci. He also received an invitation to star in a new production at the Metropolitan Opera of Otello, which opened the 2015–2016 season. The production was notable within American opera circles due to the Met's decision to abandon their tradition of blackface for the role of Otello.

Other Antoņenko's performances include Norma at the Bavarian State Opera, Otello at Barcelona's Liceu and Zürich Opera House, and Pagliacci at Covent Garden.

In the season of 2019–2020, he was again at the Metropolitan, portraying the role of Radames in Aida, with Anna Netrebko.

== Performances ==
- Rusalka - Prince
- Aida - Radames
- Il trovatore - Manrico
- Turandot - Calaf
- Otello - Otello
- Carmen - Don Jose
- Pagliacci - Canio
- La fanciulla del West - Dick Johnson
- Tosca - Cavaradossi
- Il tabarro - Luigi
- Norma - Pollione
- Cavalleria rusticana - Turiddu
- Samson et Dalila - Samson
- Boris Godunov - Pretender
