= Shirley Love (mezzo-soprano) =

American operatic mezzo-soprano (born 1940)

Shirley Love (born January 6, 1940) is an American operatic mezzo-soprano.

== Life and career ==
Born in Detroit, Michigan on January 6, 1940, Love studied music in her home city at Wayne State University. There she was a voice student of Avery Crew, and starred in the title role of a university production of Gian Carlo Menotti's The Medium. She later pursued further voice training with Marinka Gurevich and Margaret Harshaw in New York City.

Love was a soloist with the South Oakland Symphony led by conductor Henri Nosco for the opening concert of the orchestra's inaugural 1956–1957 season in Royal Oak, Michigan. In her early career she was a member of the Robert Shaw Chorale. She began performing in operas with regional American companies in the early 1960s; including performances in her native city with the Detroit Opera Theatre. Other early performances included appearances with the Turnau Opera of Woodstock, New York (now Florida's Sarasota Opera), the Toledo Opera, and the Baltimore Opera. In the 1962 she created the role of Queen Gertrude in the world premiere of Sergius Kagen's Hamlet which was given by the Peabody Art Theater; a professional opera company in Baltimore associated with the Peabody Conservatory.

In 1964 Love was one of four winners of the American Opera Auditions (along with Sherrill Milnes); a prize which included a contract to perform at the Teatro Nuovo in Milan and the Teatro della Pergola in Florence. The year prior to this she made her début at the Metropolitan Opera on November 30, 1963, as the Second Lady in Wolfgang Amadeus Mozart's The Magic Flute with Anna Moffo as Pamina, Nicolai Gedda as Tamino, Gianna D'Angelo as The Queen of the Night, Cesare Siepi as Sarastro, Theodor Uppman as Papageno, and Silvio Varviso conducting. She remained at the Met for the next 20 consecutive seasons, notably portraying The Priestess in Aida, Annina in Der Rosenkavalier, Emilia in Otello, Rossweisse in The Ring Cycle, Gertrud in Hänsel und Gretel, Maddalena in Rigoletto, The Nurse and Innkeeper in Boris Godunov, Mother Jeanne in Dialogues des Carmélites, Berta in The Barber of Seville, Suzuki in Madama Butterfly, and Mercédès in Carmen. She also sang a large number of secondary roles at the house. Guest appearances took her to Europe (Germany and Italy) and to Philadelphia, Chicago, Cincinnati, Baltimore and Miami. Among her modern repertory was Leonard Bernstein’s Trouble in Tahiti.

Love has received reviews for her recorded work in The New York Times, Opera News, and Ovation Magazine. Said recordings include The Diary of One Who Disappeared by Leoš Janáček and The Rake's Progress by Igor Stravinsky. A portrait of the singer can be found in the Metropolitan Opera gallery, New York City.
