= Matteo Manuguerra =

Operatic baritone (1924–1998)

Matteo Manuguerra (5 October 1924 – 23 July 1998) was a Tunisian-born French baritone, one of the leading Verdi baritones of the 1970s.

Manuguerra was born in Tunis, Tunisia, to Italian parents, who later moved to Argentina. He came late to music, starting his vocal study at the age of 35, at the Buenos Aires Music Conservatory, with Umberto Landi. He made his debut as a tenor, in Mozart's Requiem. He settled in France in 1961, and after new studies, made his debut the following year as a baritone in the role of Valentin in Faust, at the Opéra de Lyon where he was to remain for three years.

Manuguerra made his Paris Opéra debut in 1966, as Rigoletto. He appeared throughout France, and sang on French radio particularly in Verdi operas such as, Nabucco, Ernani, I masnadieri, Luisa Miller, as well as in I vespri siciliani and Don Carlo, both in their original French versions.

After singing widely in Europe, Manuguerra made his American debut in 1968, as Gérard in Andrea Chénier, in Seattle. He made his Metropolitan Opera debut on 11 January 1971 as Enrico in Lucia di Lammermoor, other roles included Barnaba in La Gioconda, Carlo in La forza del destino, Amonasro in Aida, Alfio in Cavalleria rusticana, Tonio in Pagliacci, and others. He also appeared at the San Francisco Opera and the Dallas Opera.

Manuguerra had a rich and supple voice, which he utilized in both belcanto and verismo repertoire, with Verdi being always at the core, which his discography clearly demonstrates.

Matteo Manuguerra enjoyed a long career and was still active when he died suddenly of a heart attack, in Montpellier, France.

== Studio recordings ==
- Rossini - Le barbier de Séville - Jean-Pierre Marty - EMI - 1974
- Bellini - I puritani - Riccardo Muti - EMI - 1979
- Verdi - Nabucco - Riccardo Muti - EMI - 1977-78
- Verdi - I masnadieri - Richard Bonynge - DECCA/LONDON - 1979
- Verdi - La battaglia di Legnano - Lamberto Gardelli - PHILLIPS - 1977
- Verdi - Stiffelio - Lamberto Gardelli - PHILLIPS - 1979
- Verdi - La traviata - Richard Bonynge - DECCA/LONDON - 1979
- Verdi - Otello - Alain Lombard - FORLANE - 1991
- Massenet - Werther - Michel Plasson - EMI - 1979
- Mascagni - Cavalleria rusticana - Riccardo Muti - EMI - 1979
- Puccini - La bohème - James Levine - EMI - 1979
- Puccini - Tosca - Mstislav Rostropovich - DEUTSCHE GRAMMOPHON - 1976
- Zandonai - Francesca da Rimini - Maurizio Arena - BALKATON - 1987

== Sources ==
- Dictionnaire des interprètes, Alain Pâris, Éditions Robert Laffont, 1989, ISBN 2-221-06660-X
- Guide de l’opéra, Roland Mancini & Jean-Jacques Rouveroux, Fayard, 1995, ISBN 2-213-59567-4
