= Nelli Gardini =

American singer and educator (1877–1970)

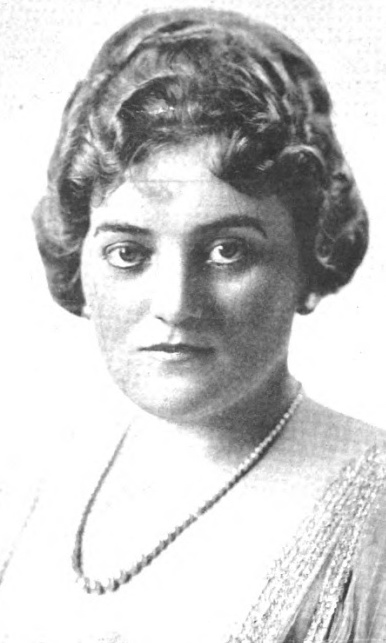
Nelli Gardini, from a 1917 publication.

Grace Nelson Stensland, better known as Nellie Gardini or Madame Gardini (1877 - January 8, 1970) was an American singer and educator. She was known for her opera singing and for working as the head of the voice department of the Chicago Musical College.

== Biography ==
Gardini was a distant relative of Edvard Grieg and used a pseudonym throughout her career. She was a native Chicagoan of Norwegian heritage whose real name was Grace Nelson Stensland. Gardini chose an "Italian" name in order to link her singing to opera traditions. Gardini was a soprano.

Gardini went to study singing in Paris in 1901. In 1903, Gardini married Theodore N. Stensland and they had one son, named after his father. She was divorced in 1909. She began to sing again under the name of Grace Nelson in 1908. She began to appear in the news as Nelli Gardini as early as 1915. In 1917, she sang with the Boston English Opera Co. where she appeared as Lenora from Il Trovatore. She went on to specialize in singing Grieg's music through the 1920s. She became head of the voice department of the Chicago Musical College in the early 1930s. Some of her students included Carol Fox, Dennis Morgan, and John Carroll.

Gardini died at age 93 on January 8, 1970, in Coral Gables, Florida at the Musicians Club of America.
