= Sigma Alpha Iota =

International music fraternity for women

- ΣΑΙ
- Founded: June 12, 1903; 123 years ago University School of Music, University of Michigan
- Type: Professional
- Affiliation: PFA; National Interfraternity Music Council (NIMC)
- Status: Active
- Emphasis: Music
- Scope: International
- Motto: Vita brevis, ars longa. "Life is short; art is long"
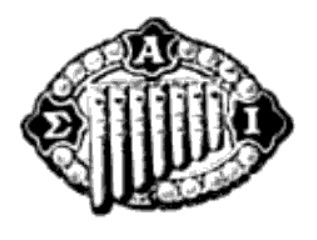
- Member badge
- Colors: Red and White
- Symbol: Pan pipes
- Flower: Red rose
- Jewel: Pearl
- Publication: Pan Pipes
- Philanthropy: Sigma Alpha Iota Philanthropies, Inc.
- Chapters: 220+ collegiate 114 alumnae
- Members: 124,690+ lifetime
- Headquarters: One Tunnel Road; Asheville, North Carolina 28805; United States
- Website: Sigma Alpha Iota homepage

Sigma Alpha Iota (ΣΑΙ) is an international music fraternity. It was established in 1903 at the University School of Music in Ann Arbor, Michigan. Sigma Alpha Iota is a member of the National Interfraternity Music Council and the Professional Fraternity Association.

== History ==
=== Founding ===
Sigma Alpha Iota was founded on June 12, 1903 at the University School of Music in Ann Arbor, Michigan. Its founders were seven women: Elizabeth A. Campbell, Frances Caspari, Minnie Davis Sherrill, Leila Farlin Laughlin, Nora Crane Hunt, Georgina Potts, and Mary Storrs Andersen. It was a women's fraternity, formed to "uphold the highest standards of music" and "to further the development of music in America and throughout the world".

The fraternity's Alpha chapter was incorporated on December 1, 1904. A second chapter, Beta, was chartered in 1904 at Northwestern University in Evanston, Illinois. In 1907, Sigma Alpha Iota had forty active members and 100 total initiates, with three chapters and one alumnae club. Its first national conference was held in 1907. National conferences include recitals by members.

Sigma Alpha Iota published a book of its original songs in 1923, with a second edition in 1926. In 1925, it created a scholarship that was distributed via a contest overseen by the National Federation of Music Clubs. The sorority changed its name to Sigma Alpha Iota International Music Fraternity in 1928. However, it remained an organization for women.

=== Title IX and membership ===
Title IX of the Education Amendments of 1972, enacted on June 23, 1972, prohibits discrimination based on gender in educational programs receiving federal funding. This prohibition extends to professional societies for students enrolled at universities that receive federal funds for student financial aid or other programs. However, social organizations, such as social fraternities and sororities, are specifically exempted.

To remain a fraternity of women, Sigma Alpha Iota petitioned for an exemption from Title IX from the U.S. Department of Education as a music fraternity that would initiate only women at the undergraduate level, and men and women at the professional level. In 1981, the fraternity was officially granted exemption from Title IX by the DOE to remain single-sex as a social organization.

=== 21st century ===
Sigma Alpha Iota International Music Fraternity is a member of the Professional Fraternity Association. It was a founding member of the National Council of Professional Music Fraternities.

Chapters have been chartered at over 300 universities, conservatories, and colleges. Its national headquarters are at One Tunnel Road in Asheville, North Carolina.

== Symbols ==
The sorority's badge consists of seven pan pipes, surrounded by a jeweled ellipse with the Greek letters "ΣΑΙ" in gold on a background of black enamel. Its pledge pin in the pan pipes without the jeweled surround.

Sigma Alpha Iota's motto is Vita brevis, ars longa or "Life is short; art is long." The fraternity's colors are crimson red and white. Its symbol is the Pan pipes. Its flower is the red rose. The Fraternity's jewel is the pearl.

Sigma Alpha Iota's journal is Pan Pipes, first published in 1909. The society's newsletter is Tempo! The society also publishes the Modern Music Series.

=== Symphony ===
Esher Requarth of the Nu chapter wrote the Sigma Alpha Iota Symphony:

To study and practice the goodness of life, the beauty of art, the meaning of music.
To sing the song of sincerity and universal peace.
To speak the words that build, that bless and comfort.
To play the harpstrings of loving kindness, tolerance, appreciation, and genuine gratitude.
To strive for the joy of simplicity, for the noble, to be faithful over a few things
To listen, to be still and know the harmony from within.
To falter never in seeking loving service, wisdom, and understanding.
In a word, to be loyal to Sigma Alpha Iota and her teachings; to find joy, hope, and inspiration; to remember that "every good gift and every perfect gift is from above" and "whatsoever ye do, do it heartily as to the Lord, and not unto men."
And again to practice.
This is to be our Symphony.

== Chapters ==
The fraternity has chartered more than 220 collegiate chapters and 114 alumnae chapters.

== Membership ==
Collegiate members must demonstrate a sincere interest in music, including those who major or minor in music. Professional musicians who meet the academic qualifications may also be admitted to college chapters. In addition, Sigma Alpha Iota recognized Patroness members who are affiliated with college chapters and are active in the community's musical life.

The society has three types of honorary memberships. Honorary members are women performing artists or composers who are nationally or internationally known. National Arts Associates are men and women who have made significant contributions to the arts at the national or international level. Friends of the Arts are men and women who support or participate in the arts at a regional or local level.

== Philanthropy ==
Created in 1974, Sigma Alpha Iota Philanthropies, Inc. is the charitable arm of the fraternity. Its mission is to "promote all aspects of music creation, performance, and scholarship; and encourage service for and through music on the campus, in the community, in the nation, and throughout the world." SAI Philanthropies, Inc. funds a wide range of projects. This includes grants to individual SAI collegiate and alumnae chapters; grants for chapter-run community outreach programs; and grants, scholarships, loans, and awards to individual members.

=== SAI Cottage ===
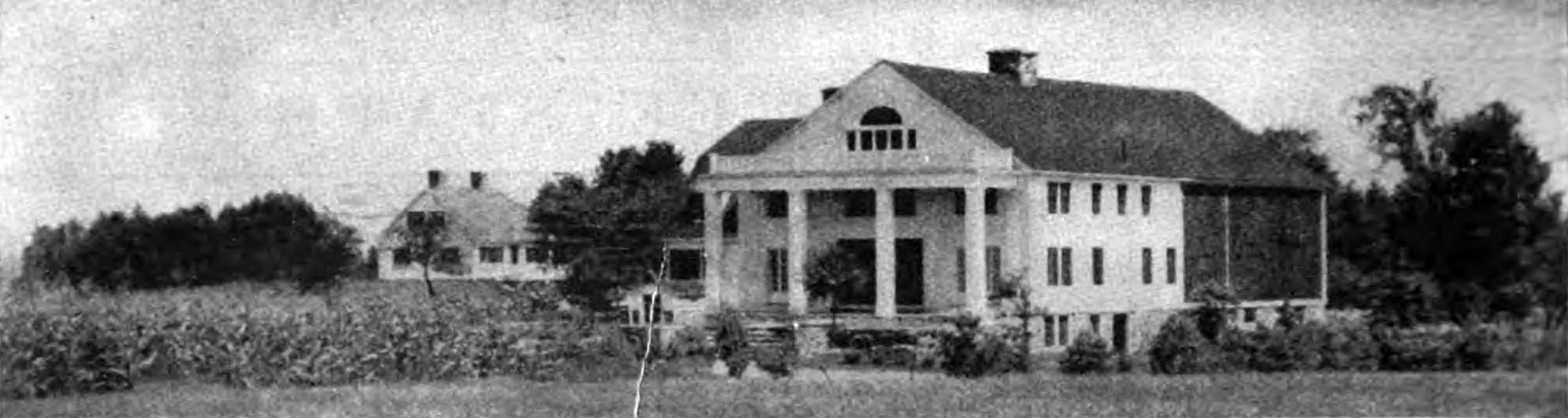
SAI Cottage (left) and Colony Hall at MacDowell.

In 1918, Sigma Alpha Iota purchased and furnished a cottage in the McDowell County artist's colony in Petersborough, New Hampshire, where its members and others artists can go to create. SAI provides continuing financial support to the cottage, including utilities, general repairs, and replacement of furnishings. In 2018, members of SAI supported a $100,000 renovation project for the cottage. SAI also supports the greater MacDowell mission, including a $75,000 donation in 2007 to restore and preserve Edward MacDowell's music room at Hillcrest Farm.

=== Inter-American Music Awards ===
The Inter-American Music Awards is a triennial competition for young composers from North, Central, and South America. The first award was presented in 1948. Selected by a panel of well-known composers, the winning composition is premiered at a Sigma Alpha Iota National Convention and is published by C. F. Peters Corporation under the direction of Sigma Alpha Iota. The composer receives a monetary prize and royalties are shared between the composer and Sigma Alpha Iota.

=== Support for musicians with special needs ===
Since 1959, SAI Philanthropies, Inc. has assisted musicians with visual impairments by contributing to the Braille Transcription Project and Bold Note Music Project, which help transcribe music into formats more easily accessible for the vision impaired.

=== People-to-People ===
Since 1963, SAI's People-to-People project has provided material assistance (instruments and accessories, scores, books, teaching materials) and encouragement to schools, music organizations, and musicians in developing countries. Musicians in more than 75 countries have received aid through this program.

=== Composer's Bureau ===
SAI Philanthropies, Inc. began the, then called The Composer's Update, in 1949 which is now called the Composers Bureau. In the modern day, this is a database of information about Contemporary American Composers. This group is composed mostly of currently acting American composers who have been recognized at the national or international level. The Bureau focuses on Concert Music. The first publication was in 1949 and contained four pages written by the first director of the Bureau, Marguerite Kelly Kyle who acted in the position for 32 years.

=== Music Therapy ===
SAI Philanthropies, Inc. supports the arts through a service called "Music Therapy". These are specific projects focused on music that benefit communities such as veterans, hospital patients, nursing home attendants, school children, and more. These projects began after World War II with services giving out different types of musical instruments and portable music players.

=== Grants ===
SAI Philanthropies, Inc. gives out grants for different needs based on their membership and outside the membership to produce involvement in music in America. Music Education Outreach Grants can be awarded to different public schools in America for grades K-12. The purpose of these grants is to help fund and assist music programs for certain needs or projects. These grants can be up to $5,000 per music program. Professional Development Grants are grants awarded by SAI Philanthropies, Inc. to encourage any music-related educational paths and Professional development with those opportunities given to current alumnae and affiliated patroness members of Sigma Alpha Iota.

== Notable members ==
Sigma Alpha Iota membership includes musicians, teachers, composers, and conductors.

== See also ==
- Professional fraternities and sororities
