= La Fête sauvage =

La Fête Sauvage

Soundtrack album by Vangelis
- Released: 1976
- Recorded: December 1975
- Studio: Nemo Studios, London
- Genre: Electronic; Film score
- Length: 38:30
- Producer: Vangelis

Vangelis chronology
Albedo 0.39 (1976)	La Fête Sauvage (1976)	Spiral (1977)

Professional ratings
Review scores
Source	Rating
Allmusic	2.5/5 stars

La Fête sauvage (The Wild Party) is an original score album by Greek composer Vangelis (as Vangelis Papathanassiou on some releases), from the 1975 documentary about animal wildlife La Fête Sauvage, by Frédéric Rossif.

== Track listing ==
1. "La Fête sauvage I" – 18:12
2. "La Fête sauvage II" – 20:18

== Overview ==
La Fête sauvage is the most world music-oriented of his soundtracks for Frédéric Rossif, compared to the mostly electronic/ambient/spacey L'Apocalypse des animaux and the highly melodic "classic Vangelis sound" of Opéra sauvage.

The first part of the album features a mixture of electronics, percussion, animal sounds, and tribal chanting which is extremely evocative of the nature of the film project. The second part moves into more familiar Vangelis territory, with lush electronic soundscapes and sweet melodies, yet still well in keeping with the movie's themes.

The chanting and percussion was performed by a number of guest musicians whom Vangelis invited to his studio.

The documentary contains much more music than is available on the album, a common theme with Vangelis soundtracks.

== Credits ==
Music written, arranged and produced by Vangelis Papathanassiou.
Sound engineer: Keith Spencer Allen
Other credited names are:

- D. A. Adams King Potato
- Lofty Amao
- Idris Baba
- Ben Da Doo
- E. Lord Eric
- Lartey Ottoo
- Paul Jeffery
- Vana Veroutis (vocals)

== Trivia ==
- A single was released from the album - Thème d'amour / Générique, (EMI/Pathe Marconi France).
- The album was reportedly recorded only three months after Heaven and Hell in 1975. 1 2
- The film does not feature the prominent vocal performance of Vana Veroutis that is on the album.
- The 1992 CD edition (on the CAM label) divided the album in two tracks, but mistakenly starts with the last half of Ignacio instead of the first half of La Fête sauvage. A new release later on changed the order of the tracks but still got the Ignacio part wrong. CAM finally corrected their mistake with a 1992 rerelease.
- Boards Of Canada sampled a small section of the track "La Fête sauvage I" in their song "Happy Cycling", from the album Music Has the Right to Children. Specifically, the seagull calls that are heard at 2:43. 34
- The SNCF used an adapted portion of the track "La Fête sauvage I" as a launch promotion for the then-new high-speed TGV services in 1981. 5

== The Wildlife Film ==
35 mm, colour
Released in France in 1976
Length: 89 minutes
Producer: Michelle Wiart
Produced by Télé Hachette and Rafran Cinématografica spa

Until recently, the movie was only available on VHS, by Belgium Production Video (PAL), and Cassette Video Hachette (SECAM). In September 2014, the film was made available in a restored version on DVD or Blu-Ray. Particularly interesting for Vangelis' fans, the new release contains the M&E (Music and effects) version of the movie, without the narrative voice. This makes it possible to enjoy a large selection of music heard in the movie but not otherwise available.

== Album versions ==
LP
1975, EMI/Pathe Marconi 2C066/14276, France
1975, Barclay 200.332, France
1975, CAM Y900.056, France
1975, CAM 6905, Canada
1976, CAM SAG 9096, Italy
1979, CAM SPL1-7175, Spain
1977, Polydor 2421100, Greece
1978, RCA PL-30036, Germany
1979, EGG GP 711, Japan
1983, CAM LCM 233451, Italy (2LP, together with Entends-tu les chiens aboyer ?)
1987, LupSom 2LL2.001, Brazil (2LP, together with Entends-tu les chiens aboyer ?)
CD
CAM 13071–2, France
CAM CSE 067, Italy
CAM CSE 800–067, Italy
CAM 493 206–2, Italy
CAM 474493, Spain
Barclay 823 756–2, Germany/US
Polydor 841 198–2, Germany
