= Beaubourg (disambiguation) =

Beaubourg may refer to:

- An area within the 4th arrondissement of Paris, France
- Colloquial name of Centre Pompidou, an art centre in the Beaubourg area of Paris
- Croissy-Beaubourg, Seine-et-Marne, Île-de-France, France
- Beaubourg (album), a 1978 avant-garde electronica album by Vangelis
