= Mask (Vangelis album) =

Studio album by Vangelis
- Released: 22 March 1985
- Recorded: London, 1984
- Studios: Nemo Studios, London
- Genres: Electronica, neoclassical dark wave
- Length: 43:47
- Label: Polydor
- Producer: Vangelis

Vangelis chronology
Soil Festivities (1984)	Mask (1985)	Invisible Connections (1985)

Professional ratings
Review scores
Source	Rating
Allmusic	4/5 stars

Mask (sometimes The Mask) is an album by the Greek electronic music composer Vangelis released in March 1985. It was the last he produced for the Polydor label. It is a dramatic work in six movements, with a somewhat dark mood and classical style which branches into ethnic styles. The album reached #69 position in the UK album charts.

== Composition ==
It is arranged like a symphony or suite, divided into movements with different moods. The 4th movement features complex percussion, with reminiscence to West African tribal drumming.

Vangelis plays all instruments, mainly synthesizers, himself. There is choral input on all tracks, and a solo male vocal on the fourth track, but all are uncredited. The choir, as in Vangelis' other choral work, sings seemingly random syllables chosen for their timbre. Similarly, the male tenor vocal of track 4 sings lyrics in a made-up language that resembles Latin. In later interviews it was revealed that the choir is probably the English Chamber Choir and that the male vocalist is Guy Protheroe; the choir also featured on Heaven and Hell (1975).

Specific synthesizer patches are Vangelis' strings from Roland's VP-330 and synth brass from Yamaha's CS-80, a piano (track 3), a marimba-like sequence (track 4), sharp arpeggio sequences from Sequential Circuits' Prophet 10 (tracks 1 and 5) and a deep mallet percussion (track 5). Timpani and snare drums are the main percussion instruments; both appear to be samples (Emulator I/Emulator II).

== Track listing ==
All songs written by Vangelis.

1. "Movement 1" – 10:18
2. "Movement 2" – 3:26
3. "Movement 3" – 6:38
4. "Movement 4" – 8:41
5. "Movement 5" – 10:00
6. "Movement 6" – 4:22
