= Invisible Connections =

Studio album by Vangelis
- Released: March 1985
- Genre: Electronic, experimental, space music
- Length: 40:31
- Label: Deutsche Grammophon
- Producer: Vangelis

Vangelis chronology
Mask (1985)	Invisible Connections (1985)	Rapsodies (1986)

Professional ratings
Review scores
Source	Rating
Allmusic	4.5/5 stars

Invisible Connections is a 1985 album by Greek electronic composer Vangelis.

== Track listing ==
The track listing of the original 1985 LP and all reissues until 2016 appeared as follows:

1. "Invisible Connections" – 18:30
2. "Atom Blaster" – 7:50
3. "Thermo Vision" – 13:19

Although it was quite noticeable that the title track had two distinct parts separated by silence, while the two shorter tracks were extremely similar in style, there was no other indication of any errors in the mastering, pressing, or labeling of the album. However, with the release in 2016 of the Delectus box set containing CD reissues of a selection of Vangelis albums remastered by the composer, it was discovered that the two sides of the album had, in fact, been reversed all along: the true "Invisible Connections" had been split into two tracks and placed on side B, while "Atom Blaster" and "Thermo Vision" had been combined into one track and placed on side A. This long-standing mistake was finally remedied on the remaster, which associates each song with its proper title and sequences the album correctly:

1. "Invisible Connections" – 21:03
2. "Atom Blaster" – 8:37
3. "Thermo Vision" – 9:44

All songs composed, arranged, produced, and performed by Vangelis.

== Overview ==
One of his most experimental albums, Invisible Connections is quite different from the majority of Vangelis's work.

Despite this, it can very loosely be said to belong to a trilogy of his 1980s albums, the other two being Soil Festivities from 1984 and Mask from the same year as Invisible Connections. These all feature a willingness of the artist, at this time, to experiment with not only music itself, but his own album release patterns, as the content differs so markedly from the style for which he was known up to this point. In fact, it may be that he was deliberately revisiting the style of Beaubourg, a 1978 album in the same minimalist vein as Invisible Connections. (Though Hypothesis, recorded in 1971 and released in 1978, is also considered to be another "experimental" album, it was a release Vangelis did not sanction and was musically more in the style of jazz fusion than minimalist.)

== Alternate releases ==
LP:

- Deutsche Grammophon VAN 10 (Canada), 1985
- Deutsche Grammophon 415 196-1 (International), 1985

CD:

- Deutsche Grammophon 415 196-2 (International), 1985
- Polydor POCG-3547 (Japan), 1996, different cover
- Disc Kiosk (CD On Demand) EAN:5050801009806, Cat No: 80100980, 2006
- The Japanese release retitled the album to Meisou-Mienai Kizuna(瞑想-見えない絆), which translates, in English, to "Meditation-Invisible Connections"
- Universal Music International B.V./Polydor (UK) Ltd., 2017
