= Nocturne: The Piano Album =

Studio album by Vangelis
- Released: 25 January 2019
- Recorded: 2018
- Genre: Classical
- Length: 75:59
- Label: Decca
- Producer: Vangelis

Vangelis chronology
Rosetta (2016)	Nocturne: The Piano Album (2019)	Juno to Jupiter (2021)

Nocturne: The Piano Album is a studio album by Greek musician and composer Vangelis, released on 25 January 2019 on Decca Records. It is a solo piano album of 11 new tracks plus arrangements of various songs from his solo career.

== Background ==
As the title suggests, Vangelis was inspired to record music of a night time theme. Artwork for the album was made available by people taking photographs of the moon and submitting them to the album's dedicated website.

"Nocturnal Promenade" is the album's first single.

== Track listing ==
All tracks written and arranged by Vangelis.

No.	Title	Length
1.	"Nocturnal Promenade"	5:51
2.	"To the Unknown Man" (From Spiral)	5:14
3.	"Movement 9, Mythodea" (From Mythodea)	3:48
4.	"Moonlight Reflections"	3:10
5.	"Through the Night Mist"	5:12
6.	"Early Years"	3:32
7.	"Love Theme, Blade Runner" (From Blade Runner)	6:05
8.	"Sweet Nostalgia"	3:38
9.	"Intermezzo"	3:45
10.	"To a Friend"	5:23
11.	"La Petite Fille de la Mer" (From L'Apocalypse des animaux)	4:45
12.	"Longing"	3:45
13.	"Chariots of Fire" (From Chariots of Fire)	5:26
14.	"Unfulfilled Desire"	4:24
15.	"Lonesome"	5:50
16.	"1492: Conquest of Paradise" (From 1492: Conquest of Paradise)	4:51
17.	"Pour Melia"	1:11

Note: The track "Longing" is not based on the song of the same name from the Blade Runner Trilogy: 25th Anniversary set.

== Personnel ==
Credits adapted from the CD liner notes.

Music

- Vangelis – piano, keyboards
- Irina Valentinova-Karpouchina – guest piano on "Movement 9, Mythodea"

Production

- Vangelis – production
- Phillipe Colonna – engineer
- Giorgios Dermentzis – photography
- Jack Crossing – art direction, design

== Charts ==
Chart (2019)	Peak position
Belgian Albums (Ultratop Flanders)	18
Belgian Albums (Ultratop Wallonia)	120
French Albums (SNEP)	141
Polish Albums (ZPAV)	25
Scottish Albums (OCC)	61
Spanish Albums (PROMUSICAE)	83
Swiss Albums (Schweizer Hitparade)	33
US New Age Albums (Billboard)	2
