= Rosetta (album) =

Studio album by Vangelis
- Released: 23 September 2016
- Recorded: 2014–16
- Genre: Electronic; ambient; classical
- Length: 53:35
- Label: Decca
- Producer: Vangelis

Vangelis chronology
Chariots of Fire: Music from the Stage Show (2012)	Rosetta (2016)	Nocturne: The Piano Album (2019)

Rosetta is a studio album by Greek composer and musician Vangelis, released on 23 September 2016 by Decca Records. It is dedicated to the Rosetta space probe mission, launched in 2004, being one of his several works which were inspired by space travel (Albedo 0.39), or produced in collaboration with space missions (Mythodea). Rosetta received a Grammy Award nomination for Best New Age Album at the 59th Annual Grammy Awards.

== Overview ==
The project is a result of a 2014 video call made between ESA astronaut André Kuipers and Vangelis, during Kuipers' mission on board the International Space Station. After their conversation, Vangelis was inspired to write an album dedicated to the first mission. In November 2014 three videos with three compositions were released on the ESA official YouTube channel in celebration of the first ever attempted soft landing on a comet by the mission: "Arrival", "Philae's Journey", and "Rosetta's Waltz".

Vangelis dedicated the album to everyone who made ESA's ongoing Rosetta Mission possible, and "Rosetta's Waltz" shows his appreciation to the mission team.

Carl Walker from ESA commented: "When we put the mission footage images together with the music, we thought it captured how people would feel if they were to see the comet for real in close-up. With music, you can enhance emotions and create memories: I believe that what Vangelis wanted to do was share a lasting memory of our Rosetta mission through his music".

The music from the album was used in the digital animation Chasing Stars, by Ross Ashton and Karen Monid from The Projection Studio, which was projected onto Blackpool Tower as part of the Blackpool Illuminations LightPool show in September 2016.

== Release ==
The album is available in digital download, streaming, CD, and vinyl LP format.

== Reception ==
Professional ratings
Review scores
Source	Rating
The Arts Desk	3/5 stars
laut.de	4/5 stars
The Bolton News	4/5 stars

Ulf Kubanke for laut.de rated it as 4/5, stating it has something for everyone, being effective in result, a "real spacy popcorn without a taste crash", with the highlight being title track "Rosetta". Johnny Sharp writing for Prog noted that "you get the feeling that the title track was always intended as the centrepiece of the album, with its plucked strings and folky dulcimer-style accompaniment emulates Morricone's mournful majesty, before triumphant brass lends an air of pomp and circumstance", but "here he's doing what he did then, and since: taking the listener on a truly fantastic journey". Barney Harsent of The Arts Desk in a 3/5 review concluded "if there is a problem with Rosetta as an album, it lies in the suggestive cinematic tropes it employs. The music is, if anything, too descriptive, too literal, and leaves the listener with very little work to do. It can, on occasion, feel like watching a documentary film on a telly with no picture. It's certainly testament to how well Vangelis can script his music, and that's a skill in itself, but it doesn't always make for the most consistently engaging listen."

== Track listing ==
No.	Title	Length
1.	"Origins (Arrival)"	4:22
2.	"Starstuff"	5:14
3.	"Infinitude"	4:30
4.	"Exo Genesis"	3:33
5.	"Celestial Whispers"	2:31
6.	"Albedo 0.06"	4:45
7.	"Sunlight"	4:22
8.	"Rosetta"	5:02
9.	"Philae's Descent"	3:04
10.	"Mission Accomplie (Rosetta's Waltz)"	2:12
11.	"Perihelion"	6:35
12.	"Elegy"	3:06
13.	"Return to the Void"	4:19

== Charts ==
Chart (2016)	Peak position
Austrian Albums (Ö3 Austria)	58
Belgian Albums (Ultratop Flanders)	10
Belgian Albums (Ultratop Wallonia)	32
Dutch Albums (Album Top 100)	33
French Albums (SNEP)	31
German Albums (Offizielle Top 100)	55
Greek Albums (Billboard)	3
Hungarian Albums (MAHASZ)	23
Italian Albums (FIMI)	30
Polish Albums (ZPAV)	41
Portuguese Albums (AFP)	25
Scottish Albums (OCC)	32
Spanish Albums (PROMUSICAE)	37
Swiss Albums (Schweizer Hitparade)	29
UK Albums (OCC)	40
US New Age Albums (Billboard)	2

== Personnel ==
- Composer, arranger, performer and producer – Vangelis
- Engineer – Philippe Colonna
- Liner Notes – Tim Cooper
- Photography – Stathis Zalidi
- Art Direction and design – Salvador Design
- Artwork (Images) – European Space Agency, ESA/ATG Medialab
