= Soil Festivities =

Studio album by Vangelis
- Released: 5 October 1984
- Recorded: 1984
- Studio: Nemo Studios, London
- Genre: Electronic
- Length: 47:59
- Label: Polydor
- Producer: Vangelis

Vangelis chronology
Antarctica (1983)	Soil Festivities (1984)	Mask (1985)

Soil Festivities is a studio album by the Greek electronic composer Vangelis, released in October 1984.

== Overview ==
This 1984 release was the first in what could be very loosely said to belong to a trilogy of his 1980s albums, the other two being Invisible Connections and Mask, both from the following year (1985). It is a concept album which derived inspiration from the natural elements, life processes taking place on the Earth's surface and beneath our feet.

He recalls that it "was made because I wanted to make music, not sell a million records. I don’t think it’s possible to guarantee commercial success for an album anyway, because nobody really knows what is commercial and what isn’t. Even if I went out of my way to make an album that was more accessible to the public, that would not guarantee its commercial success".

The album cover art features the rear view of a great diving beetle.

== Release ==
The album reached #55 position in the UK album charts, and #45 position in the Netherlands album charts in 1984.

== Composition ==
Vangelis uses synth harmonies, creative percussion and melody lines, as well as rarely used double-bass plucking sounds.

The first movement is accompanied by storm and rain effects. On top of this, Vangelis engages his improvisational skills, probably to indicate many forms of life springing into existence. The second movement has a musical quality and is the most tranquil piece, in contrast to the next three, which are darker in atmosphere.

The third movement shows the violent side of nature, indicating the struggle to survive, whilst the fourth movement is more contemplative and a bit gloomy, perhaps indicating slowed-down nightlife activity.

The fifth movement is a loose piece of improvisation, going through many moods and tempos before setting up an emotional conclusion to the life.

== Reception ==
Professional ratings
Review scores
Source	Rating
Allmusic	4/5 stars

Jim Brenholts of Allmusic notes that Vangelis "surrounds a subtle drone with heavy sequences and dense atmospheres. He uses a symphonic synth to create pastoral textures", and that it "is a very accessible album".

== Track listing ==
All songs composed by Vangelis.

1. "Movement 1" – 18:20
2. "Movement 2" – 6:20
3. "Movement 3" – 6:06
4. "Movement 4" – 9:54
5. "Movement 5" – 7:20

== Personnel ==
- Vangelis – keyboards and composer

Production

- Vangelis – producer, arranger
- Jess Sutcliffe – engineer
- Vangelis, Alwyn Clayden – design
