= Cosmos: A Personal Voyage =

1980 science documentary series

- Genre: Science documentary
- Created by: Carl Sagan; Ann Druyan; Steven Soter
- Directed by: Adrian Malone
- Presented by: Carl Sagan
- Composers: Vangelis; various artists
- Country of origin: United States
- Original language: English
- No. of seasons: 1
- No. of episodes: 13

Production
- Executive producer: Adrian Malone
- Producers: Gregory Andorfer; Rob McCain
- Running time: 60 minutes
- Production companies: Carl Sagan Productions; KCET

Original release
- Network: PBS
- Release: September 28 – December 21, 1980

Related
- Cosmos: A Spacetime Odyssey (2014); Cosmos: Possible Worlds (2020)

Cosmos: A Personal Voyage is a 1980 science documentary television series written by Carl Sagan, Ann Druyan, and Steven Soter, with Sagan as presenter. It was executive-produced by Adrian Malone, produced by David Kennard, Geoffrey Haines-Stiles, and Gregory Andorfer, and directed by the producers, David Oyster, Richard Wells, Tom Weidlinger, and others. It covers a wide range of scientific subjects, especially cosmology and its connection to the origin of life. Owing to its bestselling companion book and soundtrack album using the title, Cosmos, the series is widely known by this title, with the subtitle omitted from home video packaging. The subtitle began to be used more frequently in the 2010s to differentiate it from the sequel series that followed.

The series was first broadcast by the Public Broadcasting Service in 1980, and was the most widely watched series in the history of American public television until The Civil War (1990). As of 2009, it was still the most widely watched PBS series in the world. It won two Emmys and a Peabody Award, and has since been broadcast in more than 60 countries and seen by over 500 million people. A book was also published to accompany the series.

Cosmos: A Personal Voyage has been considered highly significant since its broadcast; David Itzkoff of The New York Times described it as "a watershed moment for science-themed television programming".

== Overview ==
Sagan on the set of Cosmos

Cosmos was produced in 1978 and 1979 by Carl Sagan Productions and Los Angeles PBS member station KCET on a roughly $6.3 million budget, with over $2 million additionally allocated to promotion. The program's format is similar to earlier BBC documentaries such as Kenneth Clark's Civilisation, Jacob Bronowski's The Ascent of Man, and David Attenborough's Life on Earth. However, unlike those series, which were shot entirely on film, Cosmos used videotape for interior scenes and special effects, with film being used for exteriors and location shooting (this film-video hybrid format was common in British scripted television at the time, but less so in documentary productions). The BBC—a co-producer of Cosmos—later screened the series, but the episodes were cut to fit 50-minute slots.

Sagan in the series' episode "Blues for a Red Planet"

The series is notable for its groundbreaking use of special effects, which allow Sagan to seemingly walk through environments that are actually models rather than full-sized sets. The soundtrack includes pieces of music provided by Greek composer Vangelis, such as Alpha, Pulstar, and Heaven and Hell Part 1 (the last movement serves as the signature theme music for the show, and is directly referenced by the title of the fourth episode). Throughout the 13 hours of the series, many tracks from several 1970s albums are used, such as Albedo 0.39, Meddle, Spiral, Ignacio, Beaubourg, and China. The worldwide success of the documentary series put Vangelis' music in the homes of many, and brought it to the attention of a global audience.

Turner Home Entertainment purchased Cosmos from series producer KCET in 1989. In making the move to commercial television, the hour-long episodes were edited to shorter lengths, and Sagan shot new epilogues for several episodes, in which he discussed new discoveries—and alternative viewpoints—that had arisen since the original broadcast. A 14th episode, consisting of an interview between Sagan and Ted Turner, was also produced. This new version of the series was eventually released as a VHS box set. This same re-edited version was also released on 12" LaserDisc. Two episodes were released per disc, one episode on each side. The LaserDiscs for the various episodes were sold separately, not in a boxed set (as was done for VHS).

Cosmos was unavailable for many years after its initial release because of copyright issues with the soundtrack music, but when it was released in 2000 on worldwide NTSC DVD, subtitles in seven languages and remastered 5.1 sound were included, as well as an alternative music and sound effects track. In 2005, The Science Channel rebroadcast the series for its 25th anniversary, with updated computer graphics and film footage, digital sound, and information about relevant scientific discoveries in the intervening 25 years. Despite being shown again on the Science Channel, the total amount of time for the original 13 episodes (780 minutes) was reduced 25% to 585 minutes (45 minutes per episode) in order to make room for commercials.

In a 2009 UK release, Fremantle Media Enterprises digitally restored and remastered the original series as a five-disc DVD set which included bonus science updates.

== Episodes ==
No.	Title	Original release date
1	"The Shores of the Cosmic Ocean"	September 28, 1980
Carl Sagan opens the program with a description of the cosmos and a "Ship of the Imagination" (shaped like a dandelion seed). The ship journeys through the universe's hundred billion galaxies, the Local Group, the Andromeda Galaxy, the Milky Way, the Orion Nebula, our Solar System, and finally the planet Earth. Eratosthenes' successful calculation of the circumference of Earth leads to a description of the ancient Library of Alexandria. Finally, the "Ages of Science" are described, before pulling back to the full span of the Cosmic Calendar. Note: the revised version of the series adds an introduction by Ann Druyan to this episode, recorded after Sagan's death, in which she discusses some of the changes that occurred in the years after its broadcast.
2	"One Voice in the Cosmic Fugue"	October 5, 1980
Sagan discusses the story of the Heike crab and artificial selection of crabs resembling samurai warriors, as an opening into a larger discussion of evolution through natural selection (and the pitfalls of intelligent design). Among the topics are the development of life on the Cosmic Calendar and the Cambrian explosion; the function of DNA in growth; genetic replication, repairs, and mutation; the common biochemistry of terrestrial organisms; the creation of the molecules of life in the Miller–Urey experiment; and speculation on alien life (such as life in Jupiter's clouds). In the Cosmos Update ten years later, Sagan remarks on RNA also controlling chemical reactions and reproducing itself and the different roles of comets (potentially carrying organic molecules or causing the Cretaceous-Paleogene extinction event).
3	"Harmony of the Worlds"	October 12, 1980
Beginning with the separation of the fuzzy thinking and pious fraud of astrology from the careful observations of astronomy, Sagan follows the development of astronomical observation. Beginning with constellations and ceremonial calendars (such as those of the Anasazi), the story moves to the debate between Earth and Sun-centered models: Ptolemy and the geocentric worldview, Nicolaus Copernicus' theory, the data-gathering of Tycho Brahe, and the achievements of Johannes Kepler (Kepler's laws of planetary motion and the first science-fiction novel).
4	"Heaven and Hell"	October 19, 1980
Sagan discusses comets and asteroids as planetary impactors, giving recent examples of the Tunguska event and a lunar impact described by Canterbury monks in 1178. It moves to a description of the environment of Venus, from the previous fantastic theories of people such as Immanuel Velikovsky to the information gained by the Venera landers and its implications for Earth's greenhouse effect. The Cosmos Update highlights the connection to global warming.
5	"Blues for a Red Planet"	October 26, 1980
The episode, devoted to the planet Mars, begins with scientific and fictional speculation about the Red Planet during the late nineteenth and early twentieth centuries (H. G. Wells' The War of the Worlds, Edgar Rice Burroughs' science fiction books, and Percival Lowell's false vision of canals on Mars). It then moves to Robert Goddard's early experiments in rocket-building, inspired by reading science fiction, and the work by Mars probes, including the Viking, searching for life on Mars. The episode ends with the possibility of the terraforming and colonization of Mars and a Cosmos Update on the relevance of Mars' environment to Earth's and the possibility of a human mission to Mars.
6	"Travellers' Tales"	November 2, 1980
The journeys of the Voyager probes are put in the context of the Netherlands in the seventeenth century, with a centuries-long tradition of sailing ship explorers, and its contemporary thinkers (such as Constantijn Huygens and his son Christian). Their discoveries are compared to the Voyager probes' discoveries among the Jovian and Saturn systems. Sagan was a member of the Voyager research team, and production of the episode coincided with the probes arriving at Jupiter; at one point, Sagan is filmed receiving one of the first-ever images of one of Jupiter's moons. In Cosmos Update, image processing reconstructs Voyager's worlds and Voyager's last portrait of the Solar System as it leaves is shown.
7	"The Backbone of Night"	November 9, 1980
Carl Sagan teaches students in a classroom in his childhood neighborhood of Brooklyn, New York, which leads into a history of the different mythologies about stars and the gradual revelation of their true nature. In ancient Greece, some philosophers (Aristarchus of Samos, Thales of Miletus, Anaximander, Theodorus of Samos, Empedocles, Democritus) freely pursue scientific knowledge, while others (Plato, Aristotle, and the Pythagoreans) advocate slavery and epistemic secrecy. Centuries later, re-discovery of the writings of the free-thinking Greek philosophers helps inspire participants in the Scientific Revolution, which led to the development of the Copernican principle – the philosophical implications of which Sagan explores. The video then returns to the Brooklyn classroom where Sagan correctly gives students the prediction that astronomers will confirm the existence of exoplanets within their lifetime.
8	"Journeys in Space and Time"	November 16, 1980
Ideas about time and space are explored in the changes that constellations undergo over time, the redshift and blueshift measured in interstellar objects, time dilation in Albert Einstein's theory of relativity, the designs of both Leonardo da Vinci and spacecraft that could travel near light speed, time travel and its hypothetical effects on human history, the origins of the Solar System, the history of life, and the immensity of space. Propping the curiosity about speed of light, Sagan suggested the possibility from the practical projects of the 20th century by British Interplanetary Society marking the beginning of interstellar travel with the projects named Project Orion and Project Daedalus. Although Project Orion was discontinued as a result of nuclear disarmament treaties, Project Daedalus pioneered the idea of using nuclear fusion rather than fission for a viable interstellar spacecraft. In Cosmos Update, the idea of faster-than-light travel by wormholes (researched by Kip Thorne and shown in Sagan's novel Contact) is discussed.
9	"The Lives of the Stars"	November 23, 1980
The simple act of making an apple pie is extrapolated into the atoms and subatomic particles (electrons, protons, and neutrons) necessary. Many of the ingredients necessary are formed of chemical elements formed in the life and deaths of stars (such as our own Sun), resulting in massive red giants and supernovae or collapsing into white dwarfs, neutron stars, pulsars, and even black holes. These produce all sorts of phenomena, such as radioactivity, cosmic rays, and even the curving of spacetime by gravity. Cosmos Update mentions the supernova SN 1987A and neutrino astronomy.
10	"The Edge of Forever"	November 30, 1980
Beginning with the origins of the universe in the Big Bang, Sagan describes the formation of different types of galaxies and anomalies such as galactic collisions and quasars. The discoveries of Edwin Hubble and Milton L. Humason are described. The episode moves further into ideas about the structure of the Universe, such as different dimensions (in the imaginary Flatland and four-dimensional hypercubes), an infinite vs. a finite universe, and the idea of an oscillating Universe (similar to that in Hindu cosmology). The search into other ideas such as dark matter and the multiverse is shown, using tools such as the Very Large Array in New Mexico. Cosmos Update shows new information about the odd, irregular surfaces of galaxies and the Milky Way perhaps being a barred spiral galaxy.
11	"The Persistence of Memory"	December 7, 1980
The idea of intelligence is explored in the concepts of computers (using bits as their basic units of information), whales (in their songs and their disruptions by human activities), DNA, the human brain (the evolution of the brain stem, frontal lobes, neurons, cerebral hemispheres, and corpus callosum under the Triune Brain Model), and man-made structures for collective intelligence (cities, libraries, books, computers, and satellites). The episode ends with speculation on alien intelligence and the information conveyed on the Voyager Golden Record.
12	"Encyclopaedia Galactica"	December 14, 1980
Questions are raised about the search for intelligent life beyond the Earth, with UFOs and other close encounters refuted in favor of communications through SETI and radio telescope such as the Arecibo Observatory. The probability of technically advanced civilizations existing elsewhere in the Milky Way is interpreted using the Drake equation and a future hypothetical Encyclopedia Galactica is discussed as a repository of information about other worlds in the galaxy (similar to the Rosetta Stone, with the life of decipherer Jean-François Champollion featured). The Cosmos Update notes that there have been fewer sightings of UFOs and more stories of abductions, while mentioning the META scanning the skies for signals.
13	"Who Speaks for Earth?"	December 21, 1980
Sagan reflects on the future of humanity and the question of "who speaks for Earth?" when meeting extraterrestrials. He discusses the very different meetings of the Tlingit people and explorer Jean-François de La Pérouse with the destruction of the Aztecs by Spanish conquistadors, the looming threat of nuclear warfare, and the threats shown by the destruction of the Library of Alexandria and the murder of Hypatia. The episode ends with an overview of the beginning of the universe, the evolution of life, and the accomplishments of humanity and makes a plea to mankind to cherish life and continue its journey in the cosmos. The Cosmos Update notes the preliminary reconnaissance of planets with spacecraft, the fall of the Berlin Wall and the end of apartheid in South Africa, and measures towards the reduction of nuclear weapons.

=== Ted Turner Interviews Carl Sagan ===
Some versions of the series, including the first North American home video release (though not the DVD release), included a specially-made fourteenth episode, which consisted of an hour-long interview between Sagan and Ted Turner, released in 1991 in which the two discussed the series and new discoveries made in the years since its first broadcast.

== Special edition ==
Title card of the special edition of Cosmos

The 1986 special edition of Cosmos features new computer animated sequences and filmed segments with Sagan, as well as new narration. It includes content from Sagan's book Comet and discussion of his theory of nuclear winter; this material was not used in subsequent television or home video releases. The special edition premiered as one marathon program on the TBS network, and was later broadcast in Japan, Germany, Australia, Singapore, and Argentina. It is much shorter than the original version, at four and a half hours, divided into six 45-minute episodes:

1. Other Worlds, Part 1
2. Other Worlds, Part 2
3. Children of the Stars, Part 1
4. Children of the Stars, Part 2
5. Message from the Sky, Part 1
6. Message from the Sky, Part 2

The 1986 version of Cosmos contains a mix of music used in the original version, with a unique soundtrack composed by Vangelis specifically for the special edition. The score is often referred to as Comet, as "Comet 16" is used during the opening and closing credits of each episode. Of the 21 cues, "Comet 16" is the only one that has been officially released, although some of the new music appears in the 2000 remastered DVD release.

== Music of Cosmos ==
=== LP and cassette ===
In 1981, a soundtrack LP was released by RCA Records shortly after the series' airing, which included the signature theme "Movement 3" (from "Symphony to the Powers B" from the album Heaven and Hell) by Greek synthesist and composer Vangelis (catalog No. ABL 1–4003 and TMS-50061; both also released on cassette tape).

Side A

1. Space / Time Continuum
  1. "Movement 3" (from "Symphony to the Powers B" from the album Heaven and Hell) – Vangelis
  2. "Symphony No.11 In G Minor ('The Year 1905'), Op.103: The Palace Square (Adagio)" – Dmitri Shostakovich (Performed by Leopold Stokowski and the Houston Symphony)
  3. "Alpha" (from the album Albedo 0.39)– Vangelis
2. Life
  1. "(Depicting) Cranes In Their Nest" – Goro Yamaguchi
  2. "Pachelbel's Canon" – Johann Pachelbel (Performed by James Galway)
  3. "The Four Seasons: Spring" – Antonio Vivaldi
  4. "The Sea Named 'Solaris' (BWV 788)" – Johann Sebastian Bach (Performed by Isao Tomita)
3. The Harmony of Nature
  1. "Partita For Violin Solo No. 3 In E, BWV 1006" – Johann Sebastian Bach (Performed by Arthur Grumiaux)

Side B

4. Exploration
  1. "'Vishnu Symphony No. 19, Op. 217" – Alan Hovhaness
  2. "Legacy" – Larry Fast
  3. "Russian Easter Festival Overture" – Nikolai Rimsky-Korsakov (Performed by Seattle Symphony)
  4. "Inside The Heart Of The Universe" – Toru Takemitsu
5. Cataclism
  1. "Fly...Night Bird" – Roy Buchanan
  2. "Beaubourg, Part 2" – Vangelis
  3. "The Rite of Spring" – Igor Stravinsky (Performed by Swedish Radio Symphony Orchestra)
6. Affirmation
  1. "Entends-Tu Les Chiens Aboyer?" – Vangelis
  2. "Izlel ye Delyo Haydutin" – Traditional (Performed by Valya Balkanska)
  3. "Heaven & Hell, Part I" – Vangelis

=== CD ===
In 1994, RCA Records reissued the original soundtrack compilation on compact disc and, in 2002, reissued it on its Collectables label (RCA 07863 54003-2 USA; Collectables COL-CD-6293 USA). In 2002, a special two-disc "collector's edition" of music from the series was released to coincide with the DVD reissue, containing complete versions of many of the songs from the series only available as snippets on previous releases.

==== Collector's Edition ====
Disc One

1. "Heaven & Hell, Part I" – Vangelis (4:09)
2. "The Year 1905" – Dmitri Shostakovich (Performed by Helsinki Philharmonic) (5:38)
3. "Alpha" – Vangelis (5:42)
4. "(Depicting) Cranes In Their Nest" – Goro Yamaguchi (1:00)
5. "Clarinet Concerto in A Major, K. 622" – Wolfgang Amadeus Mozart (Performed by Mostly Mozart Orchestra) (7:53)
6. "Pachelbel's Canon" – Johann Pachelbel (Performed by James Galway) (5:08)
7. "Metamorphosis" – Jeffrey Boydstun (3:34)
8. "The Sea Named 'Solaris' (BWV 788)" – Johann Sebastian Bach (Performed by Isao Tomita) (6:04)
9. "Partita For Violin Solo No. 3 In E, BWV 1006" – Johann Sebastian Bach (Performed by Arthur Grumiaux) (2:53)
10. "The Four Seasons: Spring" – Antonio Vivaldi (3:21)
11. "Sonata C-Dur Für Trompete, Oboe, Und Basso Continuo" – Gottfried Finger (Performed by Leipziger Bach-Collegium) (1:21)
12. "Concerto For Mandolin & Strings In C Major" – Antonio Vivaldi (2:34)
13. "The Tale of Tsar Saltan" – Nikolai Rimsky-Korsakov (6:35)
14. "Legacy" – Larry Fast (5:47)
15. "Russian Easter Festival Overture" – Nikolai Rimsky-Korsakov (Performed by Seattle Symphony) (7:44)

Disc Two

1. "Pulstar" – Vangelis (5:13)
2. "'Vishnu Symphony No. 19, Op. 217" – Alan Hovhaness (4:02)
3. "Melancholy Blues" – Louis Armstrong And His Hot Seven (2:59)
4. "Aquarius – Hair (Original Off-Broadway Cast Recording) (3:56)
5. "Beaubourg, Part 2" – Vangelis (3:14)
6. "The Planets: Mars" – Gustav Holst (Performed by Saint Louis Symphony Orchestra) (7:09)
7. "Alien Images 1" – Jeff Boydstun (3:24)
8. "Fly...Night Bird" – Roy Buchanan (7:43)
9. "Entends-Tu Les Chiens Aboyer?" – Vangelis (2:50)
10. "The Rite of Spring" – Igor Stravinsky (Performed by Swedish Radio Symphony Orchestra) (10:31)
11. "Prayer of St. Gregory" – Alan Hovhaness (Performed by Seattle Symphony) (4:45)
12. "Izlel ye Delyo Haydutin" – Traditional (Performed by Valya Balkanska) (5:01)
13. "Comet 16" – Vangelis (3:48) (Only the special edition of Cosmos)

=== Singles ===
The main theme, titled Heaven and Hell, Part 1, but edited from Heaven and Hell Part 1 3rd Movement, was released in the UK as an edited 7" single by BBC Records (Cat No: BBC1). The 7" single did not have the quiet keyboard intro to be found on the full Vangelis LP version originally released in 1975. The B-side of the 7" single was an edited version of Alpha, taken from the Vangelis LP Albedo 0.39.

- 1981 Heaven and Hell / Alpha RCA 71 UK
- 1981 Heaven and Hell / Alpha BBC 1
- 1981 Theme from the TV-series COSMOS / Alpha PB 5356 Holland
- 1981 Titelmelodie aus der TV-Serie "Unser Kosmos" / Alpha PB 5356 West-Germany

== Sequel series ==
On August 5, 2011, plans were announced for a sequel to the series, bringing up-to-date special effects and scientific discoveries to the themes and messages of the original series. The new 13-part series, referred to as Cosmos: A Spacetime Odyssey, was originally announced to premiere in the 2012–13 United States network television schedule, but a Twitter update from astrophysicist Neil deGrasse Tyson in June 2012 indicated an early 2014 release. Episodes began airing March 9, 2014 on the Fox Network and the next day on National Geographic Channel. The new series was hosted by Tyson and produced by the two surviving original creators, Ann Druyan and Steven Soter, with Seth MacFarlane. Another sequel series from the same team (with Tyson again hosting), Cosmos: Possible Worlds, premiered on March 9, 2020, on National Geographic.
