= El Greco (soundtrack) =

El Greco Original Motion Picture Soundtrack

Soundtrack album by Vangelis
- Released: December 20, 2007
- Recorded: 2007
- Genre: Electronic, classical
- Length: 47:07
- Label: Polydor Records
- Producer: Vangelis

Vangelis chronology
Blade Runner Trilogy, 25th Anniversary (2007)	El Greco Original Motion Picture Soundtrack (2007)	The Collection (2012)

El Greco is a soundtrack album featuring the music score for the 2007 film El Greco, by Greek electronic composer Vangelis, released in Greece and Cyprus by Universal Music Greece. The film, directed by Yannis Smaragdis, follows the life of Greek painter, Doménicos Theotokópoulos, as he travels to Italy and Spain where he becomes known as El Greco (The Greek). Vangelis previously worked with Yannis Smaragdis on his 1996 movie about the Greek poet Kavafis (a.k.a. Cavafy). It won the award for best music score at the 48th Greek State Film Awards in 2007.

== Overview ==
This is not the first project regarding El Greco with which Vangelis has been involved. In 1995, the album Foros Timis Ston Greco had a limited release (3,000 signed copies) as part of a fund raising campaign for Greek art. Three years later, in 1998, Vangelis recompiled the album, including 3 additional tracks, and retitled it El Greco.

On this soundtrack for the film El Greco, Vangelis' method is to watch the images and let them inspire his creative process. Typical of his film work, each track paints a different picture while fitting into the whole, even the three tracks not composed by Vangelis himself. Tracks 1 and 18 are different compositions of the same melody. Track 1 is a choral piece composed for the movie's climax and track 18 is a piano version that serves as the end titles. Track 2 is the actual opening titles.

== Release ==
The album was released by Polydor Records (Universal Music SA Greece) as a CD album in tri-fold digipak sleeve edition. A limited edition vinyl record was released in 2014 by Cobalt Music. On November 10 of the same year, Cobalt Music released in Greece a 1000 pieces limited Anniversary Edition box set containing soundtrack CD and Vinyl, DVD of the 2007 film, and hardcover book. By the same label on July 29, 2016 the box set was re-released in Europe.

The album has reached # 1 position in Greek Charts and kept the position for three weeks. The Anniversary Edition box set reached #7 position on the Greece Albums chart published by Billboard.

== Track listing ==
All tracks, except 5, 8, & 11, composed and performed by Vangelis.

1. Part 1 - 3:59
2. Part 2 - 1:56
3. Part 3 - 4:20
4. Part 4 - 2:26
5. Part 5 (Traditional Folk Song of Chania, Crete) - 3:06
6. Part 6 - 2:05
7. Part 7 - 1:30
8. Part 8 (composed and performed by Psarantonis) - 1:56
9. Part 9 - 1:00
10. Part 10 - 1:51
11. Part 11 (written and performed by Loudovikos ton Anogeion) - 2:50
12. Part 12 - 4:56
13. Part 13 - 2:36
14. Part 14 - 1:06
15. Part 15 - 2:40
16. Part 16 - 2:46
17. Part 17 - 2:28
18. Part 18 - 3:16

== Credits ==
- Composed and Performed by Vangelis
- Track 5 features the Choir of the Historical, Cultural and Folklore Association of Chania, Crete, "Kritikes Madares"
- Voices: The Choir of the Greek Radio and Television
- Choir music score transcription & Choir master: Irina Valentinova

Production

- All tracks Arranged and Produced by Vangelis
- Assistant Sound Engineer, Mixer and Assistant Producer: Vangelis Saitis
- Sound Engineer: Frederick Rousseau
- Cover design: Stathis Zalidis
- Photographers: Evi Psilaki, Helen Smaragdis, Manolis Metzakis, Maria Moschou
