= Horses Galore =

British children's television programme (1977-1979)

Horses Galore is a BBC1 children's television programme broadcast between 1977 and 1979. Susan King presented the show, and David Turnbull was its producer. The show spawned a book with the same title that was authored by King. It was followed by the show The Best of Horses Galore, which aired in 1981 and was presented by King.

== History ==
Horses Galore aired between 1977 and 1979 and was hosted by Susan King. David Turnbull was the show's producer. The theme tune was Pulstar from the album Albedo 0.39 by Vangelis (an edited version, as released on the 4-track EP, "Vangelis"). The show's 1978 season was nine weeks long and featured various figures involved in equine activities.

In the show's premiere episode, King interviewed Paddy McMahon, a show jumper who lives in Oxfordshire, who shared advice with beginner riders. A January 1978 episode showcased junior equestrianism. An April 1978 episode featured coachman George Mossman, an 81-year-old man who broke a 98-year record by having in how long it took to swap four horses into their harnesses. The previous record was 47 seconds and Mossman's horses were swapped in 42 seconds. In a May 1978 episode, King interviewed Tom Sampson, a farmer in Hampshire. She observed as his fire engine powered by horses performed. The show shared that horses were used to power fire engines before mechanical ones were available.

In a January 1979 episode, King profiled the National Equestrian Centre in Stoneleigh, Warwickshire and the Horse of the Year Show and discussed how horse thieves could be thwarted by freeze branding. A second January 1979 episode covered the Hungary-based World Driving Championships that took place the previous summer. Another January 1979 episode covered the Junior European Three Day Event hosted at Burghley House in which Britain was in an international contest with 14 countries. King interviewed Bill Thomson, the cross country obstacle course builder; Isabel Reid, the British team's manager; and trainer David Hunt.

On a May 1979 episode, King discussed the history of the Arabian horse. On another May 1979 episode, King discussed how many street sellers favoured using a horse over a truck to transport goods. She interviewed Jim Bellman, who discussed how London streets used to be crammed full of horses transporting an assortment of goods including coal and milk. An episode filmed in Wokingham showcased King family's Welsh Mountain Pony stallion in a contest. On a June 1979 episode, King interviewed Tanya Larrigan, who was "Britain's youngest international dressage rider" and with her horse Salute was chosen to compete for Britain in the European Team Dressage Championships. Larrigan answered questions submitted by viewers and gave them tips.

Susan King presented the 1981 show The Best of Horses Galore. In addition to new content about equestrian sports, the show featured clips from Horses Galore that King most liked.

== Reception ==
Jill Morris of The Age wrote, "Horses Galore is rather like a series of items from This Week in Britain, and it constantly refers to the 'children' who ride, clean saddles and so on, which is annoying." The Sunday Mirror praised the show, writing, "Fresh-faced and country-wise Susan King introduces this new series about horses, ponies, show-jumping and breeding. But not how to win your way to the stars via the bookmakers. Children will love it."

== Book adaptation ==
Susan King wrote a book titled Horses Galore published in 1979. It discussed 28 subjects including topics covered on the television series such as Horse of the Year Show and how to prepare for horse racing. The book discussed background about how the show was produced and is illustrated. The Bookseller called it a "delightful book". Noting that the book has "something to satisfy every horse lover", Barbara Hardcastle of Huddersfield Daily Examiner wrote that it was "profusely illustrated by some fine photographs." Coventry Evening Telegraph praised the book, writing "she captures the same enthusiasm in print that she did on the small screen" and the book "will appeal to horse lovers of all ages".
