= Rossif =

Rossif may refer to:

- Frédéric Rossif (1922-1990), French film director of Yugoslavian origin
- Rossif Sutherland (b. 1978), Canadian actor
