= The Wild Nation =

- French theatrical release poster
- Directed by: Frédéric Rossif
- Written by: Madeleine Chapsal
- Narrated by: Evelyne Dress; Gérard Falconetti; Myriam Mézières
- Cinematography: Bernard Zitzermann
- Music by: Vangelis
- Release date: 4 February 1976
- Running time: 93 minutes
- Country: France
- Language: French

The Wild Nation (original French title: La Fête sauvage) is a 1976 French wildlife documentary film directed by Frédéric Rossif. The film focuses on showing wildlife according to three main themes: love, death and dream.

== Description ==
Filmed from a distance, The Wild Nation features animals in various locations, mostly African, with minimal human interaction. Frédéric Rossif wanted to film the spontaneity and lack of reflection that takes part in the animals' lives.

Three narrators describe the animals and their behavior; rather than scientifically describing the animals, the narration treats them poetically, relates them to mythology, and describes how the animals' lives are influenced by love and death. The narration, written by Madeleine Chapsal, is sparse, with most of the film showing the animals alone, accompanied by music. A few sections of the film are constructed through experimental montage, moving away from traditional documentaristic representation.

This film begins where the documentary ends. Animals are privileged actors. Before man appeared, they filled our dreams: animals are our black memory. They remind us of the old days when we still were moving like them. I filmed a spontaneous celebration in which reflection has, for once, no part.

— Frédéric Rossif

== Re-Release ==
Previously available only on VHS, in 2014 the movie was restored and re-released on DVD and Blu-Ray by Zoroastre with the support of Studio Canal. The re-release was met with positive reviews, which especially noted the stylistic qualities of the film.

== Soundtrack ==
The movie soundtrack was composed by Vangelis, with whom Rossif had already collaborated on the 1970 series L'Apocalypse des animaux. The soundtrack for The Wild Nation was released as an album in 1976.
