= Albedo 0.39 =

Studio album by Vangelis
- Released: 24 September 1976
- Recorded: 1976
- Studios: Nemo Studios, London
- Genres: Electronica, space music
- Length: 42:30
- Labels: RCA (Original); Windham Hill (Reissue); Esoteric Recordings (2013)
- Producer: Vangelis

Vangelis chronology
Entends-tu les chiens aboyer ? (1975)	Albedo 0.39 (1976)	La Fête sauvage (1976)

Singles from Albedo 0.39
- 1. "Pulstar" Released: 5 November 1976

Albedo 0.39 is a studio album by the Greek electronic composer Vangelis, released in 1976. It was the second album produced by Vangelis in Nemo Studios, London, which was his creative base until the late 1980s. It contrasts with his previous album, Heaven and Hell, which was classically inspired and choral, while Albedo 0.39 has blues and jazz overtones. It was his first Top 20 UK album.

== Overview ==
It is a concept album themed around space physics. Its title is inspired by the idea of a planet's albedo, the proportion of the light it receives that is reflected back into space. The album title refers to the average albedo value of the planet Earth as it was calculated in 1976 (the current value is 0.30). From the explanation on the back of the LP cover: "The reflecting power of a planet or other non-luminous body. A perfect reflector would have an Albedo of 100%. The Earth's Albedo is 39%, or 0.39".

As with Heaven and Hell, it was performed at the Royal Albert Hall in 1977.

== Release ==
The album reached #18 on the UK Album Charts. In 2011 the album was included along with Heaven and Hell and Spiral in a 3-CD box set series "Original Album Classics" by Sony, RCA and Legacy Recordings. In 2013 the album was released in a remastered and reissued digipak edition by Esoteric Recordings.

== Instruments ==
Vangelis plays all instruments. As well as synthesizers, other instruments include acoustic drums, bass, percussion, a xylophone, a gamelan (track 2), and recordings of the speaking clock and the Apollo Moon landing. The only vocal is the narrative on the closing title track by Vangelis' sound engineer, Keith Spencer-Allen.

== Composition ==
"Pulstar" builds on a synthesizer pulse sequence, a main line and various other synthesizer brass lines. It ends with a recording of the speaking clock. "Freefall" builds on a gamelan sequence and a synthesizer line. "Mare Tranquillitatis" is a quiet synthesizer piece featuring recordings of several Apollo Moon landings. "Main Sequence" is propelled by a pulsed synthesizer sequence, along which a drums-based jazz track develops. It calms down and flows into the next song, "Sword of Orion", built on an arpeggio chord, melody, and percussion.

On "Alpha", Vangelis employs a composing technique he would use extensively on later albums (e.g. Direct): a simple theme of a few bars is developed through increasingly complex instrumentation. Instruments include a slow synthesizer arpeggio, synthesizer mallet melody line, xylophone, percussion and (later) acoustic drums. The "Nucleogenesis" suite is a collage that conveys a somewhat darker mood, employing a church organ, an organ synthesizer pulse, various lines of Vangelis' patent synthesizer brass, acoustic drums and basses. The title track, "Albedo 0.39" builds on waxing and waning synthesizer chords and arpeggios, while a voice, reputedly the album's engineer Keith Spencer-Allen, narrates various physical properties ascribed to the Earth, such as its mass, length of the year in various measurements, and, finally, its albedo.

== Reception ==
Professional ratings
Review scores
Source	Rating
Allmusic	3/5 stars

Mike DeGagne of Allmusic described the tracks as "mesmerizing trips of assorted rhythms that include elements of jazz and mild rock", that along with "Albedo 0.39", "the two parts of "Nucleogenesis" are among the strongest cuts that keep his cosmic theme from deviating, while the livelier "Pulstar" involves some impressive instrumental range and electronic buoyancy". He concluded that "the stretches of notes and rhythms don't become weary or monotonous at any point of the album", and that "intention of conjuring up the vastness and immensity of space is soundly accomplished". Henri Stirk from Background Magazine rated the 2013 edition by Esoteric Recordings 4/5 stars.

== Track listing ==
All songs written and arranged by Vangelis.

Side one
No.	Title	Length
1.	"Pulstar"	5:45
2.	"Freefall"	2:20
3.	"Mare Tranquillitatis"	1:45
4.	"Main Sequence"	8:15
5.	"Sword of Orion"	2:05
Total length:		20:10

Side two
No.	Title	Length
6.	"Alpha"	5:45
7.	"Nucleogenesis (Part One)"	6:15
8.	"Nucleogenesis (Part Two)"	5:50
9.	"Albedo 0.39"	4:30
Total length:		22:20

== Personnel ==
- Vangelis — synthesisers, keyboards, drums, bass, and all other sounds

Production

- Vangelis — producer, arranger
- Keith Spencer-Allen — engineer, vocals on "Albedo 0.39"
- Graves/Aslett Assoc. — sleeve design
- Ray Massey — cover photograph
- David Ellis — Vangelis photograph

== Appearances in other media ==
- "Pulstar" was used as the theme music for a children's BBC television programme, Horses Galore. It was also used as an early theme tune for ESPN's SportsCenter, ABS-CBN's news programs TV Patrol (until November 1994) and The World Tonight (until 1996) in the Philippines and TVRI's news program Dunia Dalam Berita (until 1981, 2002–2005, modified version used since 2018) in Indonesia. Some local newscasts used Pulstar as theme music, including WNEV in Boston, CBLT in Toronto and CBMT Newswatch in Montreal. In Brazil it appeared on a TV ad for the cigarette brand Advance, in a high-tech styled, three-minute long clip by director João Daniel Tikhomiroff involving several cigarettes rolling and moving to make geometric shapes. It was an instantaneous success due to its vanguard look for the time.
- Excerpts from "Pulstar" and "Alpha" can be heard on episodes of Carl Sagan's documentary series Cosmos, along with several other Vangelis themes. "Alpha" was used over animation illustrating evolutionary theory, with the music's climax timed to coincide with the appearance and achievements of humans.
- An excerpt from "Pulstar" was used as the title track in the 2009 BBC drama series Micro Men.
- Excerpts from "Pulstar" and "Alpha" were used in the 1980 film Death of a Princess. Despite the controversy over the film that outraged the government of Saudi Arabia, both pieces were used for a long time as background music for interludes on Saudi national TV.
- "Alpha" was used in the 1981 XXX movie American Desire.
- In Spain, "Pulstar" was used by Cadena COPE radio station as an ident of their news services.
- In Brazil, excerpts from "Nucleogenesis (Part One)" were used during journalistic reports in the Domingo Legal TV show, from SBT, during the 1990s and 2000s. It was revived in 2014 in Band's show, Tá Na Tela, again, serving as the background music for journalistic reports.
- In Israel, "Alpha" was heard on the first Empire of Cinema logo in the early 1980s. In the United States, it can also be heard on a local station id for Los Angeles, California-based public television station KCET when it was a PBS member station in the early 1980s.
- A remixed version of "Alpha" is heard on seasons 1 and 2 in travel documentary television series Madventures.
