= Reprise 1990–1999 =

Reprise 1990-1999

Compilation album by Vangelis
- Released: October 1999
- Genre: Electronic, classical
- Length: 66:07
- Label: East West
- Producer: Vangelis

Vangelis chronology
El Greco (1998)	Reprise 1990-1999 (1999)	Mythodea (2001)

Reprise 1990–1999 is a compilation album by Greek composer Vangelis, released in 1999.

== Overview ==
It contains tracks from the albums released by East West Records in the 1990s, with two additional tracks that were never previously released; "Theme from Bitter Moon" is the opening theme of the film Bitter Moon (1992), while "Psalmus Ode" is the theme for the film The Plague.

Both unreleased pieces have been re-recorded, or at least represent different recordings from the film versions. "Bitter Moon" is a variation on the opening titles theme and follows the structure of a piece somewhere in the middle of the film, a lot of the synths and strings originate from this scene, but a lead in Vangelis' recognizable cello sample has been replaced by new piano parts, and the whole piece is mixed differently with extra effects, synths and a cymbal sample. "Psalmus Ode" is a variation on the end titles song, where a new bridge has been inserted between chorus and verse, most of the accompaniment has been rerecorded, changed to be more simple in the start and more full near the finish with a very low male choir.

The tracks have been blended into each other, like earlier on a compilation like Portraits. For this a few little extra sound effects were added, like a few horns from "Bon Voyage" to "Dreams of Surf" and a short timpany roll to start "Monastery of La Rabida".

== Reception ==
Professional ratings
Review scores
Source	Rating
Allmusic	4/5 stars

Mike DeGagne of Allmusic praised Vangelis for managing to "keep his atmospheric pastiches from sounding redundant by giving each of his albums a unique persona that never imitated or borrowed from other pieces". He noted the track were "focused closely on classically oriented textures and softer, gentler keyboard applications", and that their album's conceptual beauty can be still appreciated, concluding the album is worth owning "especially for those who want to start off with just a taste of his '90s material".

== Track listing ==
No.	Title	Original release	Length
1.	"Bon Voyage"	Oceanic	2:15
2.	"Dreams of Surf"	Oceanic	2:39
3.	"Opening"	1492: Conquest of Paradise	0:56
4.	"Conquest of Paradise"	1492: Conquest of Paradise	4:43
5.	"Monastery of La Rabida"	1492: Conquest of Paradise	3:44
6.	"Come to Me"	Voices	4:25
7.	"Light and Shadow"	1492: Conquest of Paradise	3:48
8.	"Fields of Coral"	Oceanic	3:35
9.	"Movement 5"	El Greco	3:40
10.	"Movement 6"	El Greco	4:44
11.	"West Across the Ocean Sea"	1492: Conquest of Paradise	2:55
12.	"Theme from "Bitter Moon"	Previously unreleased	3:42
13.	"Rachel's Song"	Blade Runner	4:22
14.	"Movement 4"	El Greco	6:30
15.	"Psalmus Ode" (From The Plague)	Previously unreleased	4:41
16.	"Dawn"	The City	4:43
17.	"Prelude"	Voices	4:36

== Credits ==
- Vangelis — composer and performer
- Track 4 — English Chamber Choir conducted by Guy Protheroe
- Track 6 — Caroline Lavelle
- Track 10 — Konstantinos Paliatsaras
- Track 13 — Mary Hopkin
- Track 14 — Montserrat Caballe
- Track 15 — Jeremy Budd, text selected and edited by Guy Protheroe
- Track 16 — voices and footsteps by Roman Polanski and Emanuelle Polanski

Production

- Vangelis — producer, arranger
- Frederick Rousseau, Philippe Colonna — engineer, mixer
- Vangelis Saitis — assistant engineer
- Evagelia Akrivou, Demosthenes Ekonomides — art direction, design
- Angelos Hatziandreou — cover photography
- Stathis Zalidis — inside photography

== Charts ==
Chart (1999)	Peak position
Germany	75
Sweden	24
