= L'Apocalypse des animaux (album) =

Soundtrack album by Vangelis
- Released: 1973
- Recorded: Studio Europa Sonor; Paris, 1970
- Genres: Electronic; Film score
- Length: 35:00
- Label: Polydor
- Producer: Vangelis

Vangelis soundtracks chronology
Earth (1973)	L'Apocalypse des animaux (1973)	Heaven and Hell (1975)

Professional ratings
Review scores
Source	Rating
Allmusic	3/5 stars

L'Apocalypse des animaux is a soundtrack album by Greek composer Vangelis. The album's music accompanied a documentary series about the animal kingdom directed by Frédéric Rossif that was broadcast on French TV in 1973.

== Track listing ==
All tracks composed and arranged by Vangelis.

1. "Apocalypse des animaux – Générique" – 1:26
2. "La Petite Fille de la mer" – 5:54
3. "Le Singe bleu" – 7:39
4. "La Mort du loup" – 3:03
5. "L'Ours musicien" – 1:03
6. "Création du monde" – 10:03
7. "La Mer recommencée" – 5:56

== Overview ==
This album is one of Vangelis' earliest works, recorded whilst still a member of progressive rock band Aphrodite's Child. It also marks the first time that he collaborated with French director Frédéric Rossif on soundtracks relating to his TV documentary programmes.

Though the album itself was released in 1973, the music was recorded in 1970. In opposition to the way he later recorded soundtrack music – watching the filmed material, then composing to it – in this instance he simply recorded a suite of generic tunes (based on the wildlife theme of the project, but not having access to it) and left it to the film editors to splice-in whatever they needed.

The documentary contains much more music than is available on the album, a common theme with Vangelis soundtracks.

The music belongs to a period in which Vangelis was very prolific and willing to experiment with technology and styles. Not only was he still part of a band and collaborating with a variety of artists, but he had also created a soundtrack to the film Sex Power by Henry Chapier and participated in recording sessions with some of the most talented jazz and rock musicians in London at the time, the results of which were later released without Vangelis's authorization as the albums Hypothesis and The Dragon.

== Personnel ==
- Vangelis – keyboards
- Didier Pitois – sound engineer
- Tony Kent – photography
- Flugelhorn on Le singe bleu was played by a friend of Vangelis, not himself.

== Notes ==
- Jon Anderson, lead vocalist of progressive rock group Yes, was so intrigued by the album that he decided to visit Vangelis, which began their fruitful working relationship.
- The album is called "El Apocalipsis de los Animales" in South America.
- Some LP pressings show "Création du Monde" as having a track-time of 17:45, which is incorrect.
- La Petite Fille de la mer appeared on the soundtrack of Stranger than Fiction, and although it was heard in episodes of the Japanese drama Watashitachi no Kyokasho ("Our Textbook"), the song was not included on its soundtrack.
- The track La Petite Fille de la mer features prominently in Slava Polunin's world-famous stage production Slava's Snowshow.
- "Création Du Monde" was used extensively by the band Yes as pre show music prior to the band appearing onstage during their "Relayer" tour.
- "Création Du Monde" is featured on the soundtrack to Cosmos: A Personal Voyage, appearing most prominently in a sequence in the fourth episode ("Heaven and Hell") where host Carl Sagan talks about the formation of impact craters.

• Jon Anderson, formally of the Yes, used "Création Du Monde" as the entrance music before the Firebird Suite being played, which was always the classic introduction to a Yes show. Both aired over sound system prior to both Jon and The Band Geeks taking to the stage on their 2026 tour of the USA, UK, and Europe.

== The TV documentary ==
The series consisted of six episodes, each lasting 50 minutes:

1. De l'abeille au gorille (From Bee to Gorilla)
2. Les Animaux et les hommes (Animals and Humans)
3. Une Mémoire d'élephant (Elephant's Memory)
4. Traquer le chasseur (Chasing the Hunter)
5. La Peur du loup (Fear of the Wolf)
6. L'Enfant et la mer (The Child and the Sea)

== Album versions ==
- Polydor, LP, 2393-058
- Polydor, LP, MPF 1313 (Japan)
- Polydor, CD, 831503-2
- Telewestel, CD, EUCD0004 (Hungary)
- Polydor, CD, P22P20303 (Japan)
- Polydor, cassette, 185083 (Chile). Entitled El Apocalipsis de los Animales and credited to Vangelis Papathanassiou. Track list in Spanish and French.
