= To Die in Madrid =

1963 film

- Directed by: Frédéric Rossif
- Written by: Madeleine Chapsal; Frédéric Rossif
- Produced by: Nicole Stéphane
- Narrated by: John Gielgud
- Cinematography: Georges Barsky
- Edited by: Suzanne Baron
- Music by: Maurice Jarre
- Release date: 18 April 1963
- Running time: 85 minutes
- Country: France
- Language: French

To Die in Madrid (French: Mourir à Madrid) is a 1963 French documentary film about the Spanish Civil War, directed by Frédéric Rossif. It was nominated for an Academy Award for Best Documentary Feature.

== Background ==
In 1936, the Popular Front won the elections in Spain and thus provoked a rise in discontent on the part of the right: monarchists, fascists, conservatives and others nostalgic for the pre-republic, for "eternal, Catholic and imperial Spain", attempted to overthrow the current government in Madrid with a putsch that took place on 17 and 18 July 1936. Although it failed, this coup d'état was the trigger for a bloody civil war that Frédéric Rossif documents in To Die in Madrid.

== Production and release ==
The film is a formidable piece of archival research on the Spanish Civil War, drawing on documents from the Soviet Union, the United States, France, Germany and Spain. Rossif is not a historian, but he teaches us the essential fact that the war was won thanks to the massive support of the Germans and Italians. The commentary is by Madeleine Chapsal, for the most part said by Jean Vilar and Suzanne Flon. The music is by Maurice Jarre. The producer is Nicole Stéphane.

This film was not easy to make and was much attacked at its release by both the extreme right and the extreme left. The French government, in order to please the Spanish dictator Franco, delayed the release of the film for more than a month and asked to cut some scenes. According to Nicole Stéphane's testimony in 2006, the Spanish government asked for twenty-five cuts and the French censors finally made six.

== Cast ==
- John Gielgud as Narrator (voice)
- Irene Worth as Co-Narrator
- Suzanne Flon as Récitante / Narrator (French version) (voice)
- Roger Mollien as Récitant / Narrator (French version) (voice)
- Germaine Montero as Récitante / Narrator (French version) (voice)
- Pierre Vaneck as Récitant / Narrator (French version) (voice)
- Jean Vilar as Récitant / Narrator (French version) (voice)

== Awards ==
- Prix Jean-Vigo (1963)
- Prix du Chevalier de la Barre (1963)
- BAFTA Award for Best Documentary (1968)
- Nomination: Academy Award for Best Documentary Feature (1966)
