= Fais que ton rêve soit plus long que la nuit =

Studio album by Vangelis
- Released: 1972
- Recorded: Europa-Sonor studios, Paris
- Genres: Musique concrète; sound collage
- Length: 30:57
- Labels: Reprise, # 54009 (LP)
- Producer: Vangelis O. Papathanassiou

Vangelis chronology
Fais que ton rêve soit plus long que la nuit (1972)	Earth (1973)

Fais que ton rêve soit plus long que la nuit is the first album by Vangelis Papathanassiou, released only in France and Greece. Recorded in 1971 and released in 1972 with the subtitle Poeme Symphonique, the entire theme of the record focuses on May 1968 in France and the student riots taking place there at the time. The album consists of a sound collage of music, field recordings, news snippets, protest songs and paroles. One of the choruses was later reworked as "Athenes ma ville" on Melina Mercouri's 1974 album Si Melina m'était contée. Translated the title reads, "Make your dream outlast the night".

== Track listing ==
Side one (15:32)

- C’est une nuit verte
- Celle des barricades
- Nuit verte ou rouge ou bleue ou noire
- Qu’importe mon ami
- Cela importe mon ami
- L’espoir de la victoire

Side two (15:25)

- Le rêve est réalité
- Jouissez sans entraves
- Vivez sans temps morts
- Baisez sans carottes

== Participants ==
The album sleeve lists the following "participants": Mireille Abadie, Jean-Phillipe Ancelle, Anne Bertholon, Yves Borrini, Said Boussouar, Gabriel Cinque, Christine Combe, Pierre Fabien, Katy Grandi, Gerard Hauducouer, Jean-Marie Hauducouer, Catherine Humbert, Vincent Kaldor, Michelle Lebret, Huguet Maillard, Jean-Pierre Mathieu, Christine Parat, Jacques Pieller, Marie-France Pigeau, Michel Ripoche, Alain Serve, Charles Chalkitis, La Fanfare "La gerbe des Mandolines". Apart from violinist Michel Ripoche, a friend of Vangelis's, none of the listed people seem to be professional musicians or singers.
