= Heaven and Hell (Vangelis album) =

Studio album by Vangelis
- Released: November 1975
- Recorded: September 1975
- Studio: Nemo Studios, London
- Genre: Progressive electronic
- Length: 43:14
- Label: RCA (Original); Windham Hill (Reissue); Esoteric Recordings (2013)
- Producer: Vangelis

Vangelis chronology
| L'Apocalypse des animaux (1973) | Heaven and Hell (1975) | Entends-tu les chiens aboyer ? (1975) |

Heaven and Hell is a studio album by Greek electronic composer Vangelis, released in November 1975 on RCA Records. It is the first album recorded at his Nemo Studios in London that he used until 1987. It is a concept album based on duality.

The album marks Vangelis' departure from the progressive rock sound on his previous album Earth (1973), with adoption of a more classical synthesized sound, as well his UK chart debut.

== Overview ==
In 1975, Vangelis moved to London where he set up his own Nemo Studios. The album was his first record made at the studio. He recalls that "I was trying to put together the studio while recording my first album, Heaven and Hell, at the same time. In fact, the studio was Hell because there was unmixed concrete everywhere, builders all over the place making a lot of noise, and next to all that, there I was, trying to finish my album. There was no limit as to how much time I could spend working on the album, but I felt I just had to do it, and in any case, the only way you can complete the construction of a studio quickly is to start working in it before it's actually finished".

Vangelis recalls "I don't like to prepare for a long, long, long time an album. It's more exciting for me to sit down and to play whatever comes. So this is the way that Heaven and Hell happens. I spent six weeks to make this album but I spent maybe two weeks to put down the first tracks". Vangelis played all the instruments except the choir.

The album marked Vangelis' first collaboration with singer Jon Anderson, who sings on "So Long Ago, So Clear", the closing section of Part One. Vangelis recalls how they "sat down one day and I start to play the melody and he felt so comfortable that immediately he started to write the words".

== Release ==
Heaven and Hell entered the UK Albums Chart on January 10, 1976 and reached #31. The album gained further recognition when "Movement 3" became the theme for the American television documentary series, Cosmos: A Personal Voyage by Carl Sagan. In 1981 it was released as a single titled "Heaven and Hell (Theme from 'The Cosmos')", and reached #48 in the UK Singles Chart on 18 July 1981.

In 2011 the album was included along with Albedo 0.39 and Spiral in a 3-CD box set series "Original Album Classics" by Sony, RCA and Legacy Recordings. In 2013 the album was released as a remastered and reissued digipak edition by Esoteric Recordings. The same label in September 2014 released a remastered gatefold vinyl limited edition.

== Composition ==
It is one of the most important works by Vangelis as it demonstrated for the first time his combination of synthesizer, percussion and a chorus in a rich orchestral style of electronic music. It is one of many thematic albums by Vangelis, contrasting images of Heaven, expressed with a more tranquil sound, and Hell, which sounds more avant-garde.

== Reception ==
Professional ratings
Review scores
| Source | Rating |
|---|---|
| AllMusic | 4.5/5 stars |

Steven McDonald of AllMusic described it as a "dark, thundering album" which "massed Gothic choirs and a musical depiction of all the tortures of the damned, with an impressive amount of string-driven shrieking", concluding "... it's a brilliant piece of work that should not be absent from any Vangelis collection". Henri Stirk from Background Magazine rated the 2013 edition by Esoteric Recordings 3/5 stars.

== Track listing ==
=== LP ===
Note: Early pressings of the LP include a more detailed track listing. "So Long Ago, So Clear" is listed separately on the sleeve in all editions, as opposed to the other listed tracks.

Side one

1. "Heaven and Hell Part I"

- "Bacchanale" — 4:40
- "Symphony to the Powers B" (Movements 1 and 2) — 8:18
- "Movement 3" (from "Symphony to the Powers B") — 4:03
- "So Long Ago, So Clear" — 5:00

Side two

1. "Heaven and Hell Part II"

- "Intestinal Bat" — 3:18
- "Needles & Bones" — 3:22
- "12 O'Clock" (in two parts) — 8:48
- "Aries" — 2:05
- "A Way" — 3:45

=== CD ===
1. "Heaven and Hell Part I" — 21:58
  - includes "So Long Ago, So Clear" — 4:58
2. "Heaven and Hell Part II" — 21:16

== Personnel ==
- Vangelis — synthesizers, Bösendorfer grand piano, percussion
- Jon Anderson — lead vocals and lyrics on "So Long Ago, So Clear"
- Vana Verouti — lead vocals on "12 O'Clock"
- English Chamber Choir — choir
- Guy Protheroe — conductor

Production

- Vangelis — producer, arranger
- Alan Lucas — sound engineer
- Geoff Halpin — logo design
- Mike Doud — sleeve concept
- Paul Wakefield — photographer

== See also ==
- Over the Edge (radio program)
