= De Nuremberg à Nuremberg =

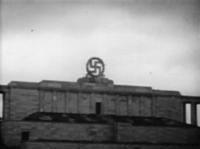
- The destruction of the Reichsparteitagsgelände stone swastika by the US Army in 1945 serves as an iconic cue in the documentary
- Directed by: Frédéric Rossif
- Written by: Philippe Meyer
- Produced by: Jean Frydman
- Starring: Philippe Meyer
- Narrated by: Philippe Meyer
- Edited by: Marie-Sophie Dubus
- Music by: Vangelis
- Distributed by: Éditions Montparnasse
- Release date: 1989
- Running time: 180 or 238 minutes
- Country: France
- Language: French

De Nuremberg à Nuremberg (fr: "From Nuremberg to Nuremberg") is a French documentary film about the Third Reich by Frédéric Rossif, with text written and read by Philippe Meyer, produced by Jean Frydman.

The title is a reference to both the Nazi mass Nuremberg Rallies held in Nuremberg from 1933, at the beginning of the regime, and to the Nuremberg Trials (1945-1946), after its fall.

== Synopsis ==
Two versions of the film, a short and a long one, respectively cut into two or four parts.

The 180-minute version is divided into two parts:

- Celebration and Triumph: the first part starts with the Nazi Party meeting held in Nuremberg on 15 September 1935, named Triumph of the Will. (Note: Triumph of the Will, an eponymous film by Leni Riefenstahl, depicts the 1934 Nuremberg Rally, while the 1935 rally was named "Rally of Freedom" (Reichsparteitag der Freiheit). The documentary errs in its allusion about this specific detail.) It ends with the death of Stefan Zweig, on 13 February 1942. (Note: Zweig and his wife actually committed suicide on 22 February 1942 rather than on 13.) This part focuses on the rise of Nazism, followed by the war of conquest of the Third Reich and its allies.
- Defeat and Judgement: this part open with a description of Resistance movements in Nazi-occupied Europe, highlighting the differences of views between the various groups, especially Communists versus others. It ends with the execution of Nazi leaders following the Nuremberg Trials and with extracts of a theatre play by Peter Weiss, Investigation on Auschwitz, (Note: The French name of the play is L'Instruction, inspired by the trial of Auschwitz officials between 1963 and 1965, which he witnessed.) played in Berlin 20 years after her capture by Allied forces. This part focuses on the gradual withdrawing of German forces facing pressure from the Allies, the rise of Resistance actions, and the eventual defeat of fascist Italy, German Reich and of Japan; the later trial examines the atrocities committed during the war.

The 238-minute version is divided into four parts:

- Celebration and Triumph
- Time for Resistance
- The decisive Turn
- Defeat and Judgement

== Technical data ==
- Realisation : Frédéric Rossif
- Music : Vangelis
- Genre : documentary
- Editing : Marie-Sophie Dubus
- Production year : 1988
- Publication year : 1989
- Country : France
- Language : French
- Production : Antenne 2
- DVD publisher : Éditions Montparnasse

== Cast ==
- Philippe Meyer : narrator

== Editing and release ==
Philippe Meyer and Frédéric Rossif has decided that the text should in no way express moral outrage or indignation, or any preconceived idea, as pure facts should in their view be sufficient to gather the viewer's attention and reflection. To keep the film as neutral as possible, the text was eventually read by Meyer himself, as to make certain that no affect would taint it.

Meyer stated that some of the cited facts, such as the German-Soviet non-aggression pact and some of its implications (notably petrol for the German planes involved in the bombings of London originating in the Soviet Union) were not well-known to the public in 1986, and that the documentary allowed some viewers to learn some details of the war. The film was delivered to Antenne 2 in 1987, but was not released for two years: firstly, it was not aired until after the French presidential election of 1988, as to avoid any semblance of opposition to its far-right candidate; furthermore, arguments such as « the French being divided » on the subject, or the notion that « Nazism does not interest anyone anymore », were put forwards and retarded the release.
