= Juno to Jupiter =

Studio album by Vangelis
- Released: 24 September 2021
- Studio: Planet Earth Studios
- Genre: Electronic; classical
- Length: 72:56
- Label: Decca
- Producer: Vangelis

Vangelis chronology
Nocturne: The Piano Album (2019)	Juno to Jupiter (2021)

Juno to Jupiter is the last studio album by Greek musician and composer Vangelis, released on 24 September 2021 by Decca Records. It was his final studio album, prior to his death in 2022. After Mythodea (2001), it is his third album inspired by space missions, this time of the space probe Juno. It features soprano Angela Gheorghiu on three tracks.

== Background ==
As the title suggests, Vangelis was inspired by NASA's space mission of Juno to Jupiter. It includes sounds from the same mission (#1, #17), and Angela Gheorghiu (#9, #13, #16). The mission and meaning of the album is "named so after Hera (in Roman Juno), who, according to Greek mythology, was the mother of Gods and humans and the wife of Zeus, in Roman Jupiter, who was the father of Gods and humans". According to Vangelis, he "put emphasis on the characteristics of Jupiter/Zeus and Hera/Juno that according to the Greek Theogony, had a special relationship. I felt that I should present Zeus/Jupiter only with sound, as the musical laws transform chaos into harmony, which moves everything and life itself. Unlike, for Hera / Juno, I felt the need for a voice. Angela Gheorghiu, represents in this historical depiction of the mission to the planet Jupiter, Hera / Juno, in a breathtaking way".

Spoken word samples on track 17 of the album, courtesy of NASA, are by scientists Randall Faelan, Chris Leeds, Jennifer Delavan and Matt Johnson.

The album was also dedicated by Vangelis to his brother Niko.

In September and October 2021 music videos were released for singles "In the Magic of Cosmos", "Hera / Juno Queen of the Gods" and "Inside Our Perspectives".

== Release ==
On the date of release the album was available in CD and digital format, with CD box set including a booklet. A double vinyl LP was released on 4 February 2022, while a limited edition box set including "2 LPs, a Mintpack CD, a 172 page hard-back book detailing the project and a Lenticular Bookmark hand signed on the back by the composer" was released on 24 June 2022.

== Reception ==
Professional ratings
Review scores
Source	Rating
Allmusic	4/5 stars
MusicOMH	4/5 stars
The Arts Desk	3/5 stars

Thom Jurek of Allmusic in a very positive review with score of 4/5 stars, praised both Vangelis and Gheorghiu performance, concluding "Juno to Jupiter, like Mythodea, is a major late-career work from Vangelis. It is carefully articulated and deeply illustrative of both its subject matter -- the loneliness and grandeur of space travel -- and its metaphorical referents in Greek mythology." Ben Hogwood of MusicOMH also gave it a positive 4/5 review, while Thomas H Green in a 3/5 review at the end remarks "while sometimes over-opulent, the best of Juno to Jupiter conjures the vastness of space, giving a sense of human machine endeavour amid infinite emptiness. Tunes such as "Jupiter's Veil of Clouds" and "Juno's Quiet Determination" show that Vangelis, albeit playing more to the amphitheatre than the spliffed bedroom, still has juice in the tank".

== Track listing ==
All tracks written and arranged by Vangelis.

No.	Title	Length
1.	"Atlas' Push"	3:40
2.	"Inside Our Perspectives"	3:32
3.	"Out in Space"	4:14
4.	"Juno's Quiet Determination"	5:17
5.	"Jupiter's Intuition"	3:58
6.	"Juno's Power"	4:09
7.	"Space's Mystery Road"	4:17
8.	"In the Magic of Cosmos"	2:07
9.	"Juno's Tender Call"	3:42
10.	"Juno's Echoes"	3:38
11.	"Juno's Ethereal Breeze"	1:31
12.	"Jupiter's Veil of Clouds"	5:17
13.	"Hera / Juno Queen of the Gods"	4:21
14.	"Zeus Almighty"	11:00
15.	"Jupiter Rex"	1:36
16.	"Juno's Accomplishments"	4:22
17.	"Apo 22"	1:53
18.	"In Serenitatem"	4:14
Total length:		72:56

Bonus track on Vinyl edition
No.	Title	Length
19.	"Cosmos Autopator"	8:57

== Personnel ==
Credits adapted from the CD liner notes. Vangelis composed, arranged, produced, performed and recorded the whole album.

Music

- Vangelis – keyboards
- Angela Gheorghiu – guest soprano vocals (#9, #13, #16)

Production

- Vangelis – production
- Philippe Colonna – engineer
- Salvador Design – art direction, design

== Charts ==
Chart (2021)	Peak position
Belgian Albums (Ultratop Flanders)	14
Belgian Albums (Ultratop Wallonia)	28
French Albums (SNEP)	200
Dutch Albums (Album Top 100)	25
Hungarian Albums (MAHASZ)	34
Portuguese Albums (AFP)	36
Swiss Albums (Schweizer Hitparade)	21
US Classical Crossover Albums (Billboard)	2
