= Spiral (Vangelis album) =

Studio album by Vangelis
- Released: December 1977
- Recorded: 1977
- Studios: Nemo Studios, London
- Genre: Electronica
- Length: 39:25
- Labels: RCA (Original); Esoteric Recordings (2013)
- Producer: Vangelis

Vangelis chronology
La Fête sauvage (1976)	Spiral (1977)	Beaubourg (1978)

Singles from Spiral
- 1. "To the Unknown Man" Released: 13 January 1978

Spiral is a studio album by the Greek electronic composer Vangelis, released in December 1977. It was the third album produced by Vangelis in Nemo Studios, London, which was his creative base until the late 1980s. For the track "To the Unknown Man", Vangelis received the Midem International Instrumental award in 1978.

== Overview ==
It is a concept album, thematically inspired by ancient Tao philosophy, exploring the nature of the universe moving in spirals. On the front cover is cited Tao Te Ching: "Going on means going far – Going far means returning", while the sleeve notes state that the track "Dervish D" is "inspired by the Dervish dancer who by his whirling realises the spiralling of the universe". Vangelis himself designed the cover artwork.

It was a less known and acclaimed album than the two which preceded in the 1970s, Heaven and Hell (1975) and Albedo 0.39 (1976).

== Release ==
The album reached number 38 on the Dutch album charts in 1978.

In 2011, the album was included, along with Heaven and Hell and Albedo 0.39, in a 3-CD box set series "Original Album Classics" by Sony, RCA and Legacy Recordings. In 2013, the album was released in a remastered and reissued digipak edition by Esoteric Recordings. It includes a bonus track, previously never issued on CD, "To the Unknown Man (II)", which was released as a B-side of the single "To the Unknown Man" in 1977.

== Instrumentation ==
The album is entirely instrumental, apart from Vangelis' processed vocals on "Ballad". Vangelis plays synthesisers, sequencers, electric piano, drums and percussion. The Yamaha CS-80 synthesizer is featured for the first time on a Vangelis album; he returned to this synth many times in subsequent albums.

== Reception ==
Professional ratings
Review scores
Source	Rating
AllMusic	2.5/5 stars
Background Magazine	4/5 stars

Mike DeGagne of AllMusic noted that the album lacks the "atmospheric" from the previous two albums. He goes on to say that "although the structures and the overall dynamics of the pieces are less complicated and less sophisticated, Spiral's keyboard utilization is still extremely effectual", and "musical movement does seem to transgress toward full, complete soundscapes", especially in "To the Unknown Man". Henri Stirk from Background Magazine rated the 2013 edition by Esoteric Recordings 4/5 stars.

== Track listing ==
All songs composed and arranged by Vangelis.

Side 1
No.	Title	Length
1.	"Spiral"	6:55
2.	"Ballad"	8:27
3.	"Dervish D"	5:14

Side 2
No.	Title	Length
4.	"To the Unknown Man"	9:01
5.	"3+3"	9:35

== Personnel ==
- Vangelis — synthesisers, voice, all instruments

Production

- Vangelis — producer, arranger, design
- Keith Spencer-Allen — engineer
- Marlis Duncklau — assistant Engineer
- Michael Hudson — graphic design
- Jack Wood — art direction
- Michael Plomer, Veronique Skawinska — photography

== Appearances in other media ==
- "To The Unknown Man" was used in the BBC coverage of the 1979 World Snooker Championship at the Crucible Theatre, in Sheffield.
