= Earth (Vangelis album) =

Studio album by Vangelis
- Released: October 1973
- Recorded: Europa-Sonor studios, Paris
- Genre: Electronica, progressive rock, world music
- Length: 38:47
- Label: Vertigo, # 6499 693 (LP)
- Producer: Vangelis O. Papathanassiou

Vangelis chronology
Fais que ton rêve soit plus long que la nuit (1972)	Earth (1973)	L'Apocalypse des animaux (1973)

Professional ratings
Review scores
Source	Rating
Allmusic	3.5/5 stars

Earth (stylised as "earth") is the first official solo album by the Greek artist Vangelis, released in 1973. In contrast to Heaven and Hell (1975) and some soundtracks by Vangelis from this period, Earth was not released on compact disc in the 1980s — it was not until 1996 that a CD version was made available, and then only in Greece.

The album was promoted by a concert, held in Paris, at the Olympia Theatre in February 1974.

In 1974 two left-over tracks from the recording sessions for Earth were issued as a single, on the WWA label: "Who", written by Fitoussi and Dassin on the A-side and featuring vocals by the former, and the instrumental "Sad Face", by Vangelis himself, on the B-side.

== Instruments ==
Vangelis plays keyboards (Hammond L100 organ, Elka Tornado reed organ, Selmer Clavioline), percussion, various ethnic instruments (flute, tabla) and provides background vocals. Most of the synthetic organic sounds on the album came from his Hammond L100 Organ put through a Binson Echorec and some other effects. Collaborating artists are Vangelis' former Aphrodite's Child bandmate Anargyros Koulouris (guitars, background vocals, and lute) and Robert Fitoussi (bass guitar and lead vocals on tracks 1, 4, 6, and 8). The latter became better known in the 1980s as "F. R. David" when he recorded the hit single "Words (Don't Come Easy)". Warren Shapovitch provided the narration on the tracks "We Were All Uprooted" and "A Song".

== Track listing ==
Side 1
No.	Title	Length
1.	"Come On"	2:09
2.	"We Are All Uprooted"	6:51
3.	"Sunny Earth"	6:41
4.	"He-O"	4:12

Side 2
No.	Title	Length
5.	"Ritual"	2:45
6.	"Let It Happen"	4:19
7.	"The City"	1:16
8.	"My Face in the Rain"	4:23
9.	"Watch Out"	3:02
10.	"A Song"	3:28
