= Do You Hear the Dogs Barking? =

1975 film

Do You Hear the Dogs Barking? ¿No oyes ladrar los perros?
- Film poster
- Directed by: François Reichenbach
- Written by: Carlos Fuentes; François Reichenbach
- Produced by: Georges Bacri; Leopoldo Silva
- Starring: Salvador Gomez; Ahui Camacho
- Cinematography: Rosalío Solano
- Music by: Vangelis
- Release date: 25 September 1975
- Running time: 82 minutes
- Country: Mexico
- Language: Spanish

Do You Hear the Dogs Barking? (Spanish: ¿No oyes ladrar los perros?, and also known as Ignacio) is a 1975 Mexican drama film directed by François Reichenbach. It was entered into the 1975 Cannes Film Festival.

The film is based on a short story, "¿No oyes ladrar los perros?", written by Juan Rulfo and collected in El Llano en llamas. The short story tells the tale of an old man carrying his wounded (criminal) son on his back in search of help. Meanwhile, he tells his son about what his future life will be like. The film intercuts between the story of the man and his child and the possible future of the child as a young indigenous man looking for work in Mexico City.

== Cast ==
- Ahui Camacho as young Ignacio
- Aurora Clavel
- Ana De Sade
- Tamara Garina
- Salvador Gómez as adolescent Ignacio?
- Juan Ángel Martínez
- Gastón Melo
- Patrick Penn
- Salvador Sánchez as El Padre de Ignacio

== Soundtrack ==
Entends-Tu Les Chiens Aboyer ?

Soundtrack album by Vangelis
- Released: 1975
- Recorded: 1975
- Genre: Progressive electronic
- Producer: Vangelis

Vangelis chronology
Heaven and Hell (1975)	Entends-Tu Les Chiens Aboyer ? (1975)	Albedo 0.39 (1976)

The film's score was composed, performed, and produced by Vangelis.

=== Track list ===
1. Entends-tu les chiens aboyer ? Part 1 – 20:42
2. Entends-tu les chiens aboyer ? Part 2 – 17:45
