= Beaubourg (album) =

Studio album by Vangelis
- Released: July 1978
- Recorded: 1978
- Studios: Nemo Studios, London
- Genres: Electronica, experimental
- Length: 39:14
- Labels: RCA (Original); Esoteric Recordings (2013)
- Producer: Vangelis

Vangelis chronology
Spiral (1977)	Beaubourg (1978)	Hypothesis (1978)

Beaubourg is a studio album by the Greek electronic composer Vangelis, released in July 1978. It was the fourth album produced by Vangelis in Nemo Studios, London, and his final album for RCA Records. It is an avant-garde-experimental album.

== Overview ==
It is a concept album inspired by the architecture of the homonymous complex area, specifically Centre Georges Pompidou in Paris. He visited the area in 1977, and recalls "I was very impressed. I returned to London and I recorded my album Beaubourg quickly, spontaneously. So I 'felt' Beaubourg, but that does not mean that Beaubourg is only this: I can redo Beaubourg in 30 different ways". The recording took him less than a month.

Vangelis noted that many people in the beginning had difficulty listening to it, but later appreciated it. He said it can be played in the background.

Vangelis expressed that he "needed courage to release this record" as RCA "has not believed in any of my four albums", or in his artistic activity, and he was "accused of purposely recording a disc of very ‘different’ electronic music"; nevertheless the album sold well. Thus he decided to leave RCA for Polydor Records.

Its release was promoted with a live appearance by Vangelis at the Pavillon de Paris on June 19, 1978.

== Release ==
In 2013 the album was released in remastered and reissued digipak edition by Esoteric Recordings.

== Instrumentation ==
The music on the album was primarily improvised on one or more Yamaha CS-80 analog synthesizers, and a ring modulator, which transforms simple tones into complex noises, was extensively used.

== Composition ==
It is entirely synthesizer-based, highly experimental and abstract; together with Hypothesis (recorded in 1971 and unofficially released in 1978) it is often considered to be one of Vangelis' least accessible works. It is musically expressive, with dramatic transformations of tonality, with short melodies that suddenly drift into distorted noises.

== Reception ==
Professional ratings
Review scores
Source	Rating
AllMusic	2.5/5 stars

Steve McDonald of AllMusic noted that the album is a "difficult listening" due to its style and "great dark synthesized tone poem". Henri Stirk from Background Magazine similarly rated the 2013 edition by Esoteric Recordings with 2/5 stars.

== Track listing ==
All songs composed and arranged by Vangelis.

1. "Beaubourg, Part I" – 18:09
2. "Beaubourg, Part II" – 21:05

== Personnel ==
- Vangelis – keyboards and other instruments

Production

- Vangelis – producer, arranger, original LP design
- Keith Spencer-Allen – recording engineer
- Marlis Duncklau – assistant engineer
- Louis East – graphics
- John Dyer – art director
- Veronique Skawinska – photography

Production (2013)

- Vangelis – remaster
- Frederick Rousseau – remaster sound engineer
