= Frédéric Rossif =

French film and television director

Frédéric Rossif (February 16, 1922 – April 18, 1990) was a Yugoslav-born French film and television director who specialized primarily in documentaries, frequently using archive footage. He covered subjects including contemporary artists such as Pablo Picasso, African wildlife, and 20th century history. Rossif's best known work was To Die in Madrid (Mourir a Madrid), a film about the Spanish Civil War for which he won the Prix Jean Vigo in 1963. One of his final works was From Nuremberg to Nuremberg, a three-hour television documentary about Nazi Germany. He frequently collaborated with notable composers Maurice Jarre and Vangelis.

== Early life ==
Rossif was born in Cetinje, Montenegro, Yugoslavia. His family was killed during the Second World War.

He studied in Rome in late 1930s and early 1940s before joining the French Foreign Legion's 13th Demi-Brigade in 1944.

After the war, in 1945 Rossif established himself in Paris and worked at Club Saint-Germain. During those years he got acquainted with Jean-Paul Sartre, Boris Vian, Albert Camus, Ernest Hemingway and Malcolm Lowry among others. He gained French citizenship in 1947.

== Career ==
Since 1948, Rossif actively collaborated with the Cinémathèque Française, organizing, among other things, an avant-garde festival at Antibes in 1949–50. In 1952 he joined the ORTF. Some of the first projects he participated in include Cinq colonnes à la une, Éditions spéciales, La Vie des animaux and François Chalais' Cinépanorama (1956) (producer); La Villa Santo-Sospir (1952), a documentary about a villa decorated by Jean Cocteau (assistant director) and Si Versailles m'était conté (1954), in which he acted.

Rossif began writing and directing his own films, quickly achieving a considerable degree of success. His 1963 film Mourir a Madrid (To Die in Madrid) about the Spanish Civil War was described by TIME Magazine as "shaped by French producer-director Frederic Rossif into a powerful work of art". The film received the Prix Jean Vigo and was also nominated for an Academy Award for Documentary Feature. Several of his 1960s films were scored by the celebrated French composer Maurice Jarre. In 1970 Rossif completed his only non-documentary film, Aussi loin que l'amour, featuring Salvador Dalí as one of the actors.

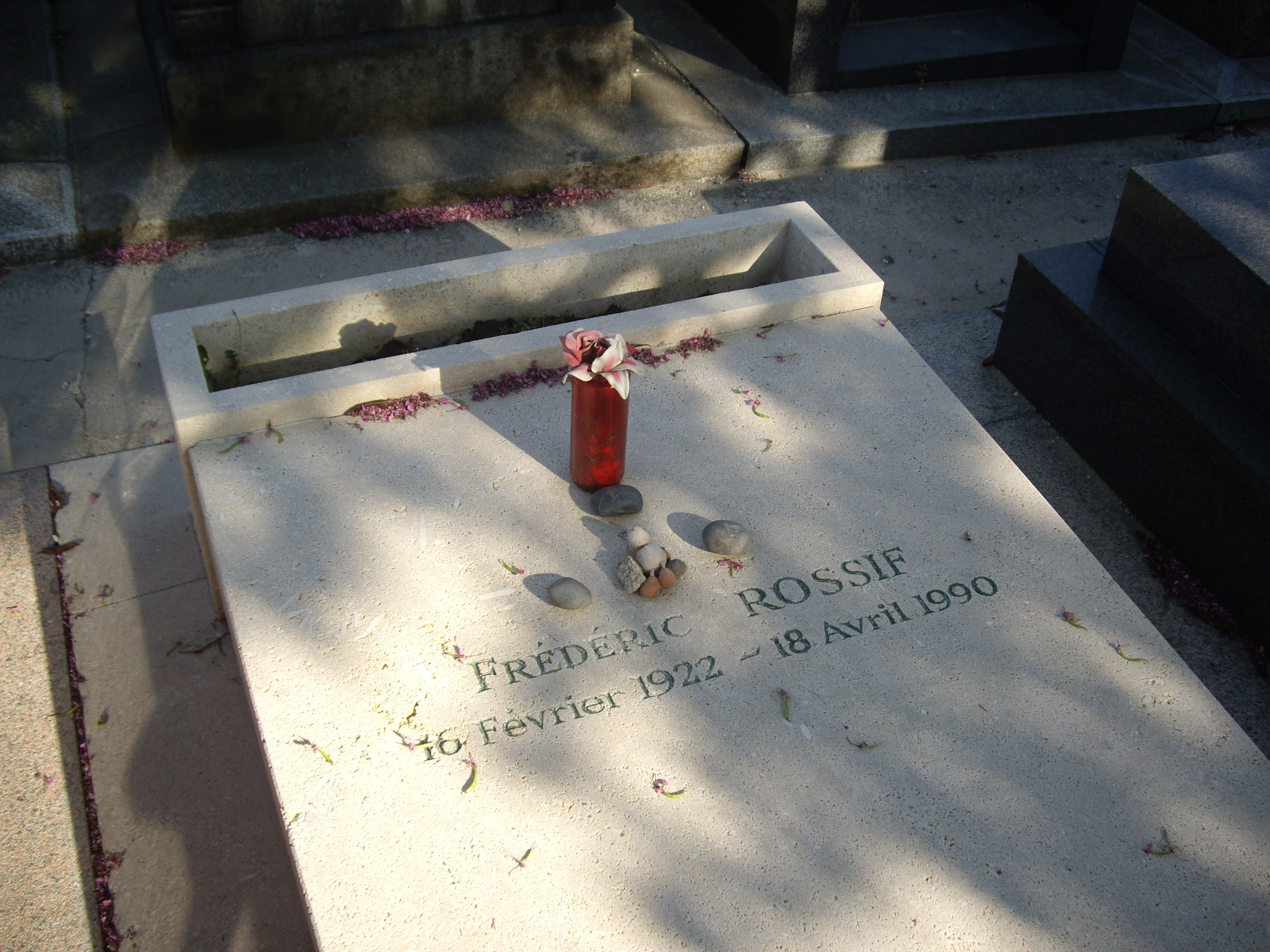
Frédéric Rossif's tomb in the Cimetière du Montparnasse

In early 1970s, Rossif met the Greek composer Vangelis, who was working in Paris at the time. The two collaborated on a large number of films, most notably the wild-life documentaries L'Apocalypse des animaux, L'Opéra sauvage and La Fête sauvage, some of the music from which was released on CD. Vangelis' music for an ocean scene from the 6th episode of L'Apocalypse, called "La Petite Fille de la Mer", subsequently became a modern classic. In 1980 Rossif directed a documentary dedicated to Vangelis, called L'Arbre de vie.

== Later years and death ==
Rossif died in 1990 and was buried in the Cimetière du Montparnasse in Paris. His last projects included the monumental World War II documentary De Nuremberg à Nuremberg (1989) and Pasteur le Siècle, a documentary commemorating the 100th anniversary of L'Institut Pasteur (1987), a departure from the director's usual themes.

== Partial filmography ==
Wildlife:

- La Vie des animaux (TV series broadcast during the 1950s, producer)
- Nos amis les bêtes (TV series broadcast during the 1950s, producer)
- 1963, Les Animaux*
- 1970–1971, L'Apocalypse des animaux (TV series, 6 episodes)**
- 1975–1981, L'Opéra sauvage (TV series, 22 episodes)**
- 1975, La Fête sauvage (feature film), on African wildlife**
- 1984, Sauvage et beau (feature film)**
- 1986, Splendeur sauvage (compilation)**
- 1989, Beauté sauvage (compilation)**
- 1989, Les Animaux de Frédéric Rossif (compilation)**

Art and music:

- 1971, Cantique des créatures (?)
- 1971, Georges Mathieu ou la fureur d'être**
- 1972, Au Pays des visages, on photographer Gisèle Freund**
- 1974, Georges Braque ou le temps différent**
- 1981, Jacques Brel
- 1981, Pablo Picasso peintre**
- 1980, Des compagnons pour vos songes
- 1983, Les Grandes Demoiselles, Étienne Hajdu, sculpteur on sculptor Étienne Hajdu
- 1985, La Fête de la musique (festival à Paris)
- 1986, Le Cœur musicien
- 1989, Morandi, on painter Giorgio Morandi**

Others:

- 1959, Imprévisibles Nouveautés, about the petroleum industry, commemorating the 100th anniversary of Edwin Drake's oil well drilling
- 1959, Spécial Noël : Jean Gabin
- 1961, Le Temps du ghetto, about the Jewish ghettos in Warsaw, Poland*
- 1961, Vél d'hiv (short film), about sports at the Vélodrome d'hiver, rue Nélaton (15e)*
- 1962, De notre temps (short film)
- 1963, Mourir à Madrid, about the Spanish Civil War*
- 1963, Pour l'Espagne, on Spain*
- 1964, Encore Paris (short film)*
- 1966, La Chute de Berlin, about the fall of Berlin
- 1966, La Liberté de blâmer (short film), about the life of a daily newspaper (?)
- 1966, Donner à voir (TV series, 3 episodes), about first films about foreign countries
- 1966, Un roi en Bavière, about the life of Ludwig II of Bavaria
- 1967, La Révolution d'octobre, on the October Revolution; includes material from Dziga Vertov's Man with a Movie Camera
- 1968, Un mur à Jérusalem, on the history of Jews
- 1968, Portrait: Orson Welles
- 1969, Pourquoi l'Amérique?, on American history from 1917 to 1939
- 1971, Aussi loin que l'amour (Rossif's only non-documentary film)
- 1976, Les Crèches du monde
- 1976, Plus vite que le soleil (short film), on the Concorde. Later released as part of Un Ciel Signé Concorde (not a Rossif production)**
- 1978, Heureux comme le regard en France, on contemporary French art (?), see
- 1980, Une prière qui danse
- 1981, L'Arbre de vie, about Vangelis**
- 1983, Pour la musique (?)
- 1987, Pasteur le Siècle, commemorating the 100th anniversary of the Pasteur Institute**
- 1989, De Nuremberg à Nuremberg (four hours long 4-part special), on Nazism, World War II and the Nuremberg Trials**
- 1989, Tatie Danielle (as actor)
- 1990, Les Sentinelles oubliées, on American communists (?), see **

In the list, * denotes films scored by Maurice Jarre, and ** denotes films scored by Vangelis. Many of Vangelis' works created for Rossif are used more than in one film.

== See also ==
- Frédéric Rossif at IMDb
- A Frédéric Rossif page at Vangelis Movements
