= El Greco (album) =

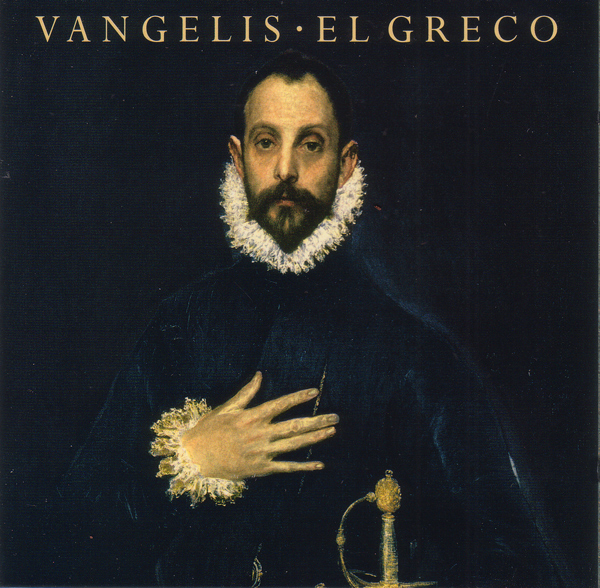

Studio album by Vangelis
- Released: 19 October 1998
- Recorded: 1995, 1998
- Genre: Electronic; classical; new-age; Byzantine music; Neoclassicism
- Length: 72:36
- Label: East West (Europe) / Atlantic (USA)
- Producer: Vangelis

Vangelis chronology
Portraits (So Long Ago, So Clear) (1996)	El Greco (1998)	Reprise 1990–1999 (1999)

Professional ratings
Review scores
Source	Rating
Allmusic	3/5 stars

El Greco is a 1998 classical album by Greek electronic composer and artist Vangelis (1943 - 2022). The title is a reference to the man who inspired the composition, Dominikos Theotokópoulos (known as El Greco, "The Greek"; 1541–1614), the painter and sculptor of the Spanish Renaissance. It consists of ten long movements performed on electronic instruments.

== Overview ==
This album is an expansion of an earlier album by Vangelis, Foros Timis Ston Greco. That album had been released in 1995, in a limited edition. For this general release, the track order was rearranged, three new tracks were added, and the album title was changed.

Vangelis composed and arranged the album, and performed all the instruments, accompanied by a choir conducted by Ivan Cassar. The music is in a Byzantine style yet sounding contemporary due to his use of synthesizers. Soprano Montserrat Caballé and tenor Konstantinos Paliatsaras make guest appearances on one movement each.

The album reached #66 in France and #74 in Germany. At the Billboard New Age Albums chart peaked at #9 position.

The image on the album is "The Knight with His Hand on His Breast" by El Greco.

== Track listing ==
All tracks by Vangelis

In parentheses, correspondence to the track listing of Foros Timis Ston Greco.

1. Movement I (Movement I) – 10:04
2. Movement II (Movement II) – 5:18
3. Movement III (new) – 6:48
4. Movement IV (Movement III) – 6:21
5. Movement V (new) – 4:30
6. Movement VI (Movement V) – 7:52
7. Movement VII (new) – 3:18
8. Movement VIII (Movement IV) – 9:43
9. Movement IX (Movement VI) – 12:00
10. Movement X (Epilogue) (Movement VII) – 6:21

Movements IV, V, and VI were included in Vangelis' compilation Reprise 1990–1999.

== Personnel ==
- Vangelis – synthesisers, arranger, producer, liner notes
- Montserrat Caballé – soprano vocals
- Konstantinos Paliatsaras – tenor
- Philippe Colonna – engineer, recording
- Rob Dickins – art direction
- Fredrick Rousseau – engineer, recording

== Charts ==
=== Weekly charts ===
Chart (1998)	Peak position
Hungarian Albums (MAHASZ)	11
