= The Dragon (album) =

Studio album by Vangelis
- Released: 1978
- Recorded: June 1971
- Studio: Marquee Studios, London
- Genre: Progressive rock
- Length: 36:07
- Label: Affinity
- Producer: Giorgio Gomelsky

Vangelis chronology
Hypothesis (1978)	The Dragon (1978)	China (1979)

The Dragon is a studio album by the Greek electronic composer Vangelis, unofficially released in 1978.

== Background ==
After the break-up of Aphrodite's Child, Vangelis wanted to relocate to London. Producer Giorgio Gomelsky introduced him to some other musicians and put together a collaborative project which was funded by French free jazz record label BYG records with the intention of releasing an album. Two albums' worth of material had resulted from these sessions, but were unfinished and never intended for release.

Some years later, Charly Records took over the catalogue of the bankrupt BYG records and released the recordings as album The Dragon and Hypothesis in 1978 without the approval of the performers. The sleeve was made by Terry Oakes. In Germany Hypothesis and The Dragon were issued together as a double album titled Portrait. Vangelis subsequently took the label to court to have both albums taken off the market and won the case.

== Recording and personnel ==
Apart from Vangelis (who played the keyboards), the line-up consisted of long-term musical collaborator Arghiris (Anargyros "Silver" Koulouris) (guitar), and session musicians Michel Ripoche (violin), Brian Odgers (bass), Micky Waller (drums). The sessions were recorded in London's Marquee Studios by Giorgio Gomelsky. According to Gomelsky, 'The idea was to find "grooves" that could lead into long, (Sufi)trance-like but evolving rhythmic patterns with a lot of improvisation on top'.

- Vangelis – keyboards
- Anargyros "Silver" Koulouris – electric and acoustic guitars
- Brian Odger – bass guitars
- Micky Waller – drums, percussion
- Michel Ripoche – violin

== Reception ==
Professional ratings
Review scores
Source	Rating
Allmusic	2.5/5 stars

Steven McDonald at Allmusic notes that although the album was mainly released to cash in on Vangelis' popularity, it contains elements of both Aphrodite's Child and Vangelis' upcoming solo work. Vangelis himself noted that the sessions were bad and he doesn't agree with such music.

== Track listing ==
Side one
No.	Title	Length
1.	"The Dragon"	15:18

Side two
No.	Title	Length
1.	"Stuffed Aubergine"	11:17
2.	"Stuffed Tomato"	9:32
