= Hypothesis (album) =

Album by Vangelis

Studio album by Vangelis
- Released: 1978
- Recorded: May 1971
- Studio: Marquee Studios, London
- Genre: Electronica, experimental, jazz
- Length: 32:10
- Label: Affinity, # CR 3037
- Producer: Vangelis, Giorgio Gomelsky

Vangelis chronology
Beaubourg (1978)	Hypothesis (1978)	The Dragon (1978)

Professional ratings
Review scores
Source	Rating
Allmusic	2/5 stars

Hypothesis is a studio album by the Greek electronic composer Vangelis, unofficially released in 1978.

== Background ==
In May 1971 Vangelis had played several sessions in London's Marquee Studios, joined for some of them by violinist Michel Ripoche, bass guitarist Brian Odgers (called Odger on the sleeve) and drummer Tony Oxley, the rhythm section of the famous Extrapolation recording released by John McLaughlin. Two albums' worth of material had resulted from these sessions, but were unfinished and not intended for release. Later, when Vangelis was becoming famous, the label published the material without his permission, using forged signatures, and in 1978 two albums appeared in shops, on the Affinity label (a subsidiary of Charly Records) - Hypothesis and The Dragon. Vangelis won a court case to have both LPs taken off the market. He said greed was the motivation for releasing the sub-par albums: "I don't agree with that music at all."

== Overview ==
The album takes the form of an extended jam session of experimental jazz.

An alternative release of Hypothesis was titled Visions of the Future.

In Germany Hypothesis and The Dragon were issued together as a double album titled Portrait.

The cover artwork for Hypothesis is by Angus McKie, and is merely a "borrowed" illustration he drew for a series of novels by SF author Brian Stableford, featuring the spacecraft Hooded Swan, mentioned in the books.

== Track listing ==
1. "Hypothesis, Part 1" – 16:00
2. "Hypothesis, Part 2" – 16:10
