= Vangelis =

Greek composer and musician (1943–2022)

Vangelis Βαγγέλης
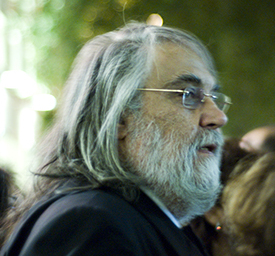
- Vangelis at the premiere of El Greco in 2007

Background information
- Also known as: A. Loafer; Alpha Beta; Mama O'; Odyssey; Richard Broadbaker; Roup La Montagne; Vangelis Papathanassiou
- Born: Evangelos Odysseas Papathanassiou; 29 March 1943; Agria, Greece
- Died: 17 May 2022 (aged 79) Paris, France
- Genres: Ambient; classical; electronic; new-age; progressive electronic; progressive rock; psychedelic rock
- Occupations: Composer; arranger; record producer; musician; songwriter; art director
- Instruments: Keyboards; percussion; piano; synthesizers
- Years active: 1963–2022
- Labels: Universal; RCA; Atlantic; Sony; Warner Bros.; Polydor; Decca; Deutsche Grammophon
- Formerly of: Aphrodite's Child; The Forminx; Humanity; Inter-Groupie Psychotherapeutic Elastic Band; Jon and Vangelis

Evangelos Odysseas Papathanassiou (Greek: Ευάγγελος Οδυσσέας Παπαθανασίου, pronounced [eˈvaɲɟelos oðiˈseas papaθanaˈsi.u]; 29 March 1943 – 17 May 2022), known professionally as Vangelis (/væŋˈɡɛlɪs/ vang-GHEL-iss; Greek: Βαγγέλης, pronounced [vaɲˈɟelis]; also credited as Vangelis Papathanassiou), was a Greek composer, arranger, performer and record producer. He released material of wide musical genres such as electronic music, progressive rock, ambient, and classical orchestral music. He is primarily known for his film scores, composing the Academy Award-winning score to Chariots of Fire (1981), as well as composing the scores of (among many) Blade Runner (1982), Missing (1982), Antarctica (1983), The Bounty (1984), 1492: Conquest of Paradise (1992), and Alexander (2004), and the 1980 PBS documentary series Cosmos: A Personal Voyage by Carl Sagan.

Born in Agria and raised in Athens, Vangelis began his career in the 1960s as a member of the rock bands the Forminx and Aphrodite's Child; the latter's album 666 (1972) is recognised as a progressive-psychedelic rock classic. Vangelis settled in Paris and gained initial recognition for his scores to the Frédéric Rossif animal documentaries L'Apocalypse des Animaux, La Fête sauvage, and Opéra sauvage. He released his first solo albums during this time and performed as a solo artist. In 1975, Vangelis relocated to London, where he built his home recording facility named Nemo Studios and released a series of successful and influential albums for RCA Records, including Heaven and Hell (1975), Albedo 0.39 (1976), Spiral (1977), and China (1979). From 1979 to 1986, Vangelis performed in a duo with Yes vocalist Jon Anderson, releasing several albums as Jon and Vangelis. He collaborated with Irene Papas on two albums of Greek traditional and religious songs.

Vangelis reached his commercial peak in the 1980s and 1990s. His score for Chariots of Fire (1981) won him an Academy Award for Best Original Score and the film's main theme, "Chariots of Fire – Titles," went to number one on the U.S. Billboard Hot 100 chart, while his score for 1492: Conquest of Paradise (1992) was nominated for a Golden Globe Award for Best Original Score, and the film's soundtrack and main theme topped the European charts, selling millions of copies. His compilation albums Themes (1989), Portraits (So Long Ago, So Clear) (1996), and studio album Voices (1995) sold well. Vangelis composed the official anthem of the 2002 FIFA World Cup held in Korea and Japan. In his last 20 years, Vangelis collaborated with NASA and ESA on music projects Mythodea (1993), Rosetta (2016), and Juno to Jupiter (2021), his 23rd and final studio album. He died on 17 May 2022, at age 79, of heart failure at a hospital in Paris.

Having had a career in music spanning over 50 years, and having composed and performed more than 50 albums, Vangelis is one of the most important figures in the history of electronic music and modern film music. He used many electronic instruments in the fashion of a "one-man quasi-classical orchestra," composing and performing on the first take.

== Early life ==
Evangelos Odysseas Papathanassiou was born on 29 March 1943 in Agria, a coastal town in Magnesia, Thessaly, Greece, and was raised in Athens. His father Odysseus worked in property and was an amateur sprinter; Vangelis described him as "a great lover of music". His mother Foteini Kyriakopoulou was trained as a soprano. Vangelis had one brother, Nikos. Vangelis recalled a peaceful and happy childhood without interference from his parents, who let him be involved in his activities, mainly consisting of playing the piano, painting, and constructing things with his hands.

Vangelis developed an interest in music at age four, composing on the family piano and experimenting with sounds by placing nails and kitchen pans inside it and with radio interference. When he was six his parents enrolled him for music lessons, but was unable to take to formal tuition as he preferred to develop technique on his own. In later life he considered himself fortunate to have not attended music school, thinking it would have impeded his creativity. He never learned to read or write music, instead playing from memory: "When the teachers asked me to play something, I would pretend that I was reading it and play from memory. I didn't fool them, but I didn't care." One of his piano teachers was Greek composer Aristotelis Koundouroff.

Vangelis found traditional Greek music an important influence in his childhood. At 12, he developed an interest in jazz and rock music. At fifteen he formed a band with school friends who had similar musical interests. Three years later, he acquired a Hammond organ. In 1963, following brief stints in art college and an apprenticeship in filmmaking, Vangelis and three school friends started a five-piece rock band, The Forminx (or The Formynx), named after the Ancient Greek string instrument. The group played covers and original material largely written by Vangelis, whose stage name at this time was Vagos, with English lyrics by radio DJ and record producer Nico Mastorakis. After nine singles and one Christmas EP, which found success across Europe, the group disbanded in 1966.

== Career ==
=== 1963–1974: Move to Paris, early solo projects and Aphrodite's Child ===
After the Forminx split, Vangelis spent the next two years mostly studio-bound as a composer and producer. He wrote the score to several Greek films–My Brother, the Traffic Policeman (1963), 5,000 Lies (1966) by Giorgos Konstantinou, Antique Rally (1966), Frenzy (1966), To Prosopo tis Medousas (1967) by Nikos Koundouros, and Apollo Goes on Holiday (1968).

In 1967, at age 25, Vangelis formed a psychedelic/progressive rock band with Demis Roussos, Loukas Sideras, and Anargyros "Silver" Koulouris. Initially known as the Papathanassiou Set, they were encouraged by the Greek division of Philips Records to try their luck in England after their demo was passed onto Mercury Records and was well received. The relocation appealed to the group, as the political turmoil surrounding the 1967 Greek coup limited their opportunities. However, Koulouris was called up for military service, causing the band to travel without a guitarist. After the trio were denied entry into England due to problems with their work permits they settled in Paris, where they signed with Philips and renamed themselves Aphrodite's Child. Their debut single "Rain and Tears" was a commercial success in Europe, and was followed by the albums End of the World (1968) and It's Five O'Clock (1969). Vangelis conceived the idea of their third, 666 (1972), a double concept album based on the Book of Revelation. It is considered a progressive-psychedelic rock classic. In 1971, the group split following increasing tensions during the recording of 666, although Vangelis produced several of Roussos' future albums and singles. Vangelis recalled after the split: "I couldn't follow the commercial way anymore, it was very boring. You have to do something like that in the beginning for showbiz, but after you start doing the same thing everyday you can't continue."

Vangelis spent six years in Paris; he was moved by the 1968 French student riots and felt obliged to stay, during which he accepted various solo projects in film, television, and theatre. He composed the score for the films Sex Power (1970), Salut, Jerusalem (1972), and Amore (1974). A soundtrack album recorded for a 1970 wildlife documentary series by Frédéric Rossif was released as L'Apocalypse des animaux in 1973. In 1971, Vangelis took part in several jam sessions with various musicians in London, the recordings from which were released on two albums released in 1978 without his permission–Hypothesis and The Dragon. He took legal action and had them withdrawn. His first solo album, Fais que ton rêve soit plus long que la nuit (French for Make Your Dream Last Longer Than the Night), was released in 1972. Inspired by the 1968 riots, Vangelis wrote a "poème symphonique" to express his solidarity with the students, comprising music with news snippets and protest songs; some lyrics were based on graffiti daubed on walls during the demonstrations.

In 1973, Vangelis released his second solo album Earth, a percussive-orientated album with various additional musicians, including Koulouris and Robert Fitoussi. In May 1973 he performed at the Royal Festival Hall in London supporting Tempest, but looked back on the concert as a failure. The line-up featured on Earth released a single titled "Who" under the name Odyssey, and performed live with Vangelis at his concert at the Paris Olympia in February 1974. Several months later Vangelis returned to England to audition with the progressive rock band Yes, after singer Jon Anderson had become a fan of his music and invited him to replace departing keyboardist Rick Wakeman. After problems with obtaining a work visa and a rejection from the Musician's Union, plus his reluctance to travel and tour, Vangelis declined. Yes chose Swiss player Patrick Moraz, who used Vangelis' keyboards in his audition.

=== 1974–1980: Move to London, solo breakthrough, and Jon and Vangelis ===
By the end of 1974 Vangelis was able to relocate to England, by which time he felt he "outgrew France" musically. He settled in a flat on Queen's Gate, London and set up a 16-track recording facility named Nemo Studios on Hampden Gurney Street in Marble Arch, which he named his "laboratory". In August 1975, he signed a four-album deal with RCA Records, for which he released a series of influential electronic-based albums that increased his profile. The first of these was Heaven and Hell (1975), a concept album based on duality that features Anderson singing lead vocals on "So Long Ago, So Clear" and the English Chamber Choir. The album went to No. 31 in the UK, and was performed live in concert at the Royal Albert Hall in 1976. The album was followed by the UK top 20 Albedo 0.39 (1976), Spiral (1977), and the spontaneous Beaubourg (1978), each having their own thematic inspiration including astronomy and physical cosmology, Tao philosophy, and Vangelis' visit to the Centre Georges Pompidou, respectively.

During the same period, Vangelis composed the score for Do You Hear the Dogs Barking? directed by François Reichenbach. This was released in 1975 under the French title Entends-tu les chiens aboyer? and re-released two years later as Ignacio. In 1976, Vangelis released his second soundtrack for a Rossif animal documentary, La Fête sauvage, which combined African rhythms with Western music. This was followed in 1979 by a third soundtrack for Rossif, Opéra sauvage. The music itself would be re-used in other films, including the track "L'Enfant" in The Year of Living Dangerously (1982) by Peter Weir; the melody of the same track (in marching band format) appears in the beginning of the 1924 Summer Olympics opening ceremonies scene in the film Chariots of Fire while the track "Hymne" was used in Barilla pasta commercials in Italy and Ernest & Julio Gallo wine ads in the United States. In Hungary in the 1980s, the song L'Enfant was used as the theme music for the weekly news program. Rossif and Vangelis again collaborated for Sauvage et Beau (1984) and De Nuremberg à Nuremberg (1989).

By 1979, Vangelis signed with Polydor Records. His first release was China (1979), based on Chinese culture. Vangelis returned to his Greek roots by recording new arrangements of Greek folk songs with actress and singer Irene Papas. The first set of songs were released under Papas' name as the album Odes, which was a success in Greece. and would be followed in 1986 by a second album, Rapsodies. In contrast, 1980 saw the release of See You Later, a much more experimental and satirical album of concept pieces and unusual pop songs with vocal contributions from Pete Marsh, Cherry Vanilla, and Yes singer Jon Anderson, as well as a rare example of Vangelis singing himself (deliberately badly).

Vangelis had begun a more extensive collaboration with Jon Anderson in 1979, as the duo Jon and Vangelis. Their debut album, Short Stories (1980), reached No. 4 in the UK. They released three more albums; The Friends of Mr Cairo, Private Collection, and Page of Life released in 1981, 1983, and 1991, respectively. The first two albums produced three hit singles "I Hear You Now", "I'll Find My Way Home" and "State of Independence", with the latter later becoming a hit for the second time when covered by Donna Summer with production by Quincy Jones.

Vangelis' music was brought to a wider audience when excerpts from Heaven and Hell and Albedo 0.39 were used for the soundtrack of Carl Sagan's 1980 television documentary series Cosmos: A Personal Voyage. In 1986, Vangelis composed music for a special edition episode. Vangelis recalled that Sagan sent him recordings of sounds collected by satellites, which he claimed were exactly what he had heard as a child.

=== 1981–2002: Mainstream success ===
==== Film and television ====
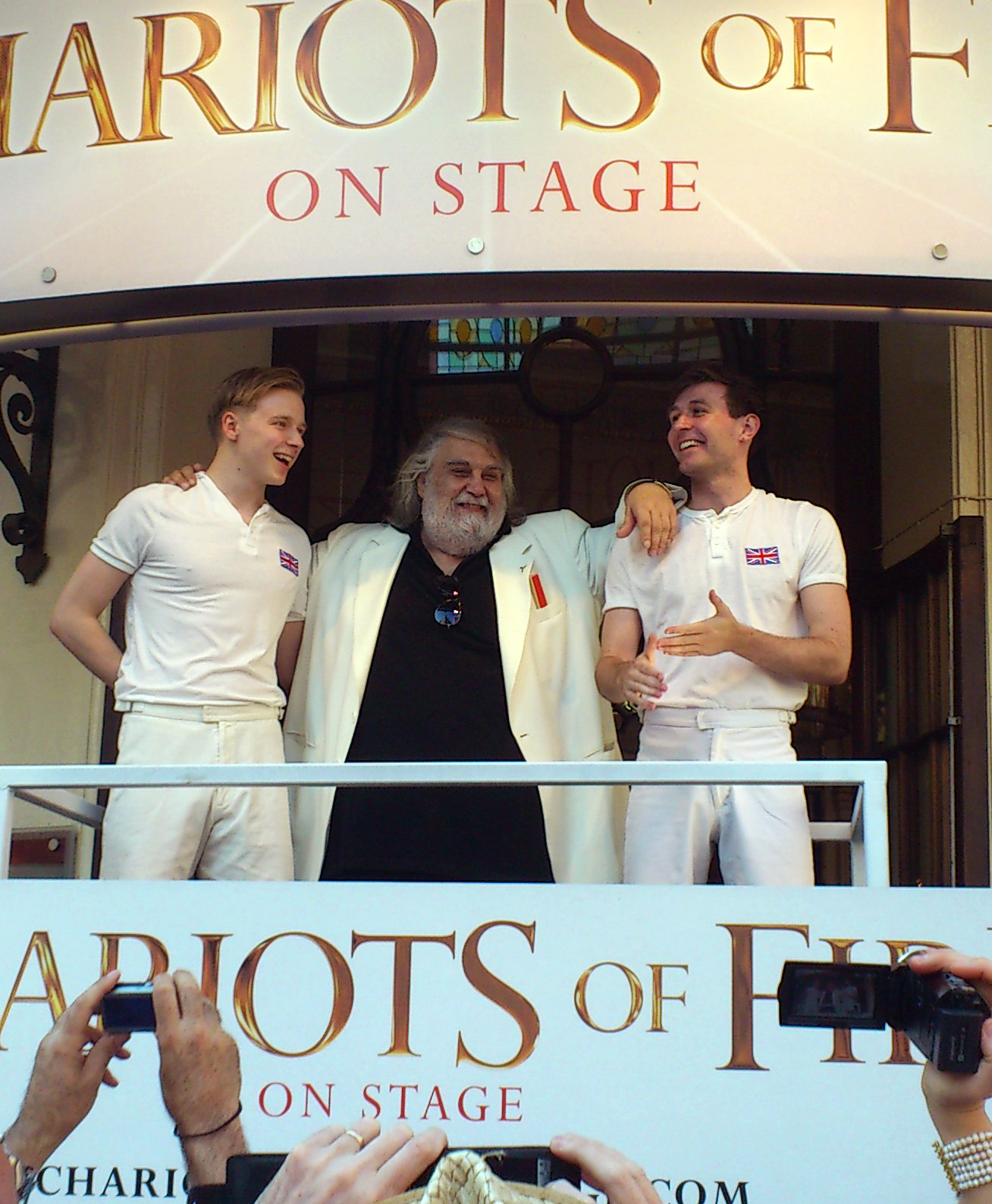
Vangelis in 2012 with stars of the stage adaptation of Chariots of Fire

Vangelis composed and performed on the soundtrack for Chariots of Fire (1981), a historical drama film directed by Hugh Hudson. He accepted the job because "I liked the people I was working with. It was a very humble, low-budget film." The choice of music was unorthodox as most period films featured orchestral scores, whereas Vangelis' music was modern and synthesiser-oriented. Released in 1981, it gained mainstream commercial success which increased Vangelis' profile as a result. The opening instrumental piece, "Titles", later named "Chariots of Fire – Titles", was released as a single and spent one week at number one on the US Billboard Hot 100 after a five-month climb. The soundtrack album was No. 1 on the Billboard 200 for four weeks and sold one million copies in the US. In March 1982, Vangelis won an Academy Award for Best Original Music Score, but refused to attend the awards ceremony, partly due to his fear of flying. He turned down an offer to stay in a stateroom aboard the Queen Elizabeth 2 for a boat crossing. Vangelis commented that the "main inspiration was the story itself. The rest I did instinctively, without thinking about anything else, other than to express my feelings with the technological means available to me at the time". The song was used at the 1984 Winter Olympics and it was described as the work for which Vangelis was best known.

Vangelis received numerous subsequent offers to score films, but he turned them down because he wanted to avoid becoming "a factory of film music". In 1981, he scored the documentary film Pablo Picasso Painter by Frédéric Rossif. It was the third such score by Vangelis as he had previously scored documentaries about Georges Mathieu and Georges Braque. He composed the score of Missing (1982) directed by Costa-Gavras, which was awarded the Palme d'Or and gained Vangelis a nomination for a BAFTA Award for Best Film Music. Other soundtracks he produced during this time include Antarctica for the film Nankyoku Monogatari (1983), one of the highest-grossing films in Japan's history, and The Bounty in 1984. He declined an offer to score 2010: The Year We Make Contact (1984), the sequel to 2001: A Space Odyssey.

In 1981, Vangelis collaborated with director Ridley Scott to score his science fiction film Blade Runner (1982). Critics wrote that in capturing the isolation and melancholy of Harrison Ford's character, Rick Deckard, the Vangelis score is as much a part of the dystopian environment as the decaying buildings and ever-present rain. The score was nominated for a BAFTA and Golden Globe award. Blade Runner has subsequently become one of Vangelis' best-known works, despite problems that prevented its release on album for many years. A disagreement led to Vangelis withholding permission for his recordings to be released, so the studio hired musicians dubbed the New American Orchestra to release orchestral adaptations of the original score. The problem was eventually resolved twelve years later, when Vangelis' own work was released in 1994. Even then, the release was considered incomplete, since the film contained other Vangelis compositions that were not included on the record. This, in turn, was resolved in 2007 when a box set of the score was released to commemorate the film's 25th anniversary, containing the 1994 album, some previously unreleased music cues, and new original Vangelis material inspired by Blade Runner.

In 1992, Paramount Pictures released the film 1492: Conquest of Paradise, also directed by Ridley Scott, as a 500th anniversary commemoration of Christopher Columbus' voyage to the New World. Vangelis' score was nominated as "Best Original Score – Motion Picture" at the 1993 Golden Globe awards, but was not nominated for an Academy Award. Due to its success, Vangelis won an Echo Award as "International Artist of the Year", and RTL Golden Lion Award for the "Best Title Theme for a TV Film or a Series" in 1996.

Vangelis wrote the score for the film Bitter Moon (1992) directed by Roman Polanski, and The Plague directed by Luis Puenzo. In the 90s, Vangelis scored undersea documentaries for French ecologist and filmmaker Jacques Cousteau, one of which was shown at the Earth Summit. The score of the film Cavafy (1996) directed by Yannis Smaragdis, gained an award at the Flanders International Film Festival Ghent and Valencia International Film Festival.

==== Theatre and stage productions ====
In the early 1980s Vangelis began composing for ballet and theatre stage plays. In 1983 he wrote the music for Michael Cacoyannis' staging of the Greek tragedy Elektra which was performed with Irene Papas at the open-air amphitheater at Epidavros in Greece. The same year Vangelis composed his first ballet score, for a production by Wayne Eagling. It was originally performed by Lesley Collier and Eagling himself at an Amnesty International gala at the Drury Lane theatre. In 1984 the Royal Ballet School presented it again at the Sadler's Wells theatre. In 1985 and 1986, Vangelis wrote music for two more ballets: "Frankenstein – Modern Prometheus" and "The Beauty and the Beast". In 1992, Vangelis wrote the music for a restaging of the Euripides play Medea, that featured Irene Papas. In 2001 he composed for a third play which starred Papas, and for a version of William Shakespeare's The Tempest staged by Hungarian director György Schwajdas.

==== Solo albums and collaborations ====
In 1974 Vangelis collaborated with Italian singer Claudio Baglioni in the album E tu.... The album reached first place in the Italian sales charts and was the sixth best-selling album in Italy in 1974.

Vangelis collaborated in 1976 with Italian singer Patty Pravo with the album Tanto and with Italian singer Milva achieving success, especially in Germany, with the albums Ich hab' keine Angst also translated in French as Moi, Je N'ai Pas Peur (1981) and Geheimnisse in 1986 (I have no fear and Secrets), also translated in Italian as Tra due sogni.

An Italian language Nana Mouskouri album featured her singing the Vangelis composition "Ti Amerò". Collaborations with lyricist Mikalis Bourboulis, sung by Maria Farantouri, included the tracks "Odi A", "San Elektra", and "Tora Xero".

Vangelis released Soil Festivities in 1984. It was thematically inspired by the interaction between nature and its microscopic living creatures; Invisible Connections (1985) took inspiration from the world of elementary particles invisible to the naked eye; Mask (1985) was inspired by the theme of the mask, an obsolete artefact which was used in ancient times for concealment or amusement; and Direct (1988). The last of the aforementioned efforts was the first album to be recorded in Vangelis' post-Nemo Studios era.

Vangelis performed his only concert in the U.S. on 7 November 1986 at Royce Hall on the campus of University of California, Los Angeles. It featured a special guest appearance by Jon Anderson.

There were another five solo albums in the 1990s; The City (1990) was recorded during a stay in Rome in 1989, and reflected a day of bustling city life, from dawn until dusk; Voices (1995) featured sensual songs filled with nocturnal orchestrations; Oceanic (1996) thematically explored the mystery of underwater worlds and sea sailing; and two classical albums about El Greco – Foros Timis Ston Greco (1995), which had a limited release, and El Greco (1998), which was an expansion of the former.

==== Sporting events ====
The Sport Aid (1986) TV broadcast was set to music specially composed by Vangelis. He conceived and staged the ceremony of the 1997 World Championships in Athletics which were held in Greece. He also composed the music, and designed and directed the artistic Olympic flag relay portion ("Handover to Athens"), of the closing ceremonies of the 2000 Summer Olympics in Sydney. While no official recording of this composition exists, the music can be heard accompanying the presentation of the emblem of the 2004 Athens Games. In 2002, Vangelis created the official Anthem for the 2002 FIFA World Cup. His work from Chariots of Fire was heard during the 2012 Summer Olympics opening ceremony. His work Conquest of Paradise (1992) (from the movie 1492: Conquest of Paradise) is now the theme song of famous Trail Running competition Ultra-Trail du Mont-Blanc.

=== 2001–2021: Music projects with NASA and ESA ===
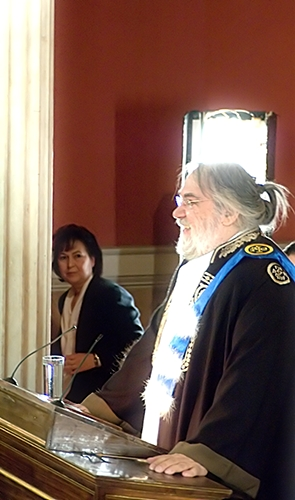
Vangelis receiving his honorary doctorate at the National and Kapodistrian University of Athens in 2008

In 2001, Vangelis performed live, and subsequently released, the choral symphony Mythodea, which was used by NASA as the theme for the Mars Odyssey mission. This is a predominantly orchestral rather than electronic piece that was originally written in 1993. In 2004, Vangelis released the score for Oliver Stone's Alexander, continuing his involvement with projects related to Greece.

Vangelis released two albums in 2007; the first was a 3-CD set for the 25th anniversary of Blade Runner, titled Blade Runner Trilogy and second was the soundtrack for the Greek movie, El Greco directed by Yannis Smaragdis, titled El Greco Original Motion Picture Soundtrack.

On 11 December 2011, Vangelis was invited by Katara Cultural Village in Qatar to conceive, design, direct, and compose music for the opening of its outdoor amphitheater. The event was witnessed by a number of world leaders and dignitaries participating in the 4th Forum of the United Nations Alliance of Civilizations held in the city of Doha. British actor Jeremy Irons performed in the role of master of ceremonies, and the event featured a light show by German artist Gert Hof. It was filmed for a future video release by Oscar-winning British filmmaker Hugh Hudson.

In 2012, Vangelis re-tooled and added new pieces to his iconic Chariots of Fire soundtrack, for use in the same-titled stage adaptation. He composed the soundtrack of the environmental documentary film Trashed (2012) directed by Candida Brady and starring Jeremy Irons. A documentary film directed by Tony Palmer called Vangelis and the Journey to Ithaka originally filmed in 2008 was finally released in its original cut in 2025. It was supplemented by 9 hours of Vangelis being interviewed by Palmer. He also scored the music for the film Twilight of Shadows (2014) directed by Mohammed Lakhdar-Hamina.

For the 12 November 2014 landing of the Philae lander on Comet 67P (part of the European Space Agency's Rosetta mission), Vangelis composed three short pieces titled "Arrival", "Rosetta's Waltz", and "Philae's Journey". The pieces were released online as videos accompanied by images and animations from the Rosetta mission. He was quoted by ESA as saying, "Mythology, science and space exploration are subjects that have fascinated me since my early childhood. And they were always connected somehow with the music I write". In September 2016, the works were released as part of the new studio album Rosetta. In 2018, Vangelis composed an original score for Stephen Hawking's memorial. While Hawking's ashes were interred at Westminster Abbey, the music which backed Hawking's words were beamed by the ESA to the nearest black hole to Earth. It was a personal tribute by Vangelis, and a limited CD titled "The Stephen Hawking Tribute" was shared with the family and over 1,000 guests.

On 25 January 2019, a new studio album, Nocturne: The Piano Album, was released which includes both new and old compositions played on a grand piano and were "inspired by night time, and by Vangelis' long-held passion for space". However, Vangelis recalled he was kind-of pressured by the record company to release it and include old compositions. In the same year, Vangelis wrote an electro-orchestral score rooted in ethnic music for The Thread, a modern dance piece created by Russell Maliphant inspired by Greek mythology and Hellenic dances. It received very positive reviews, and its CD & DVD was released in a special limited edition by Andromeda Music. On the Maliphant's project he also collaborated with fashion designer Mary Katrantzou for whom composed new music for her fashion shows.

On 24 September 2021, Vangelis released Juno to Jupiter, his last studio album. It was inspired by NASA's Juno spacecraft, featuring the soprano Angela Gheorghiu on several tracks.

== Personal life and death ==
For a musician of his stature, very little is known about Vangelis' personal life; and he rarely gave interviews to journalists. In 2005, he stated that he was "never interested" in the "decadent lifestyle" of his band days, choosing not to use alcohol or other drugs. He also had little interest in the music industry business and achieving stardom, realising "that success and pure creativity are not very compatible. The more successful you become, the more you become a product of something that generates money". Instead, he used it to be as free and independent as possible and often rejected the opportunity to promote or capitalise on his fame.

In the mid-1980s, he was in a relationship with Kathy Hill, who was the model in the Wham! hit song "Last Christmas".

Vangelis' place of residence was not publicly known; instead of settling in one place or country, he chose to "travel around". He did own a house by the Acropolis of Athens which he did not renovate. Vangelis did not have children; in 2005, he was in his third long-term relationship and said: "I couldn't take care of a child in the way I think it should be taken care of." Other interviews mention that Vangelis had been married twice; one of these marriages was to French photographer Veronique Skawinska, who produced work for some of his albums. A 1982 interview with Backstage suggests that Vangelis was previously married to Greek singer Vana Veroutis, who provided vocals for some of his records.

Although a very private person, according to many accounts he was an "inordinately approachable", "really nice" and "humorous" man, who enjoyed long friendly gatherings, was fascinated by Ancient Greek philosophy, the science and physics of music and sound, and space exploration. His daily activities mainly involved combining and playing his electronic instruments and the piano. He also enjoyed painting. His first exhibition, of 70 paintings, was held in 2003 at Almudin in Valencia, Spain. It then toured South America until the end of 2004.

Vangelis was suffering from several health issues in the last couple of years and died of heart failure on 17 May 2022, at the age of 79, at a hospital in Paris, where he was being treated for COVID-19.

== Musical style and sensibility ==
The musical style of Vangelis is diverse; although he primarily used electronic music instruments, which characterize electronic music, his music has been described as a mixture of electronica, classical (his music was often symphonic), progressive rock, jazz (improvisations), ambient, avant-garde/experimental, and world. Vangelis is sometimes categorized as a new-age composer, a classification others have disputed. Vangelis himself called New-age music a style which "gave the opportunity for untalented people to make very boring music".

Synthtopia, an electronic music review website, stated that Vangelis' music could be referred to as "symphonic electronica" because of his use of synthesizers in an orchestral fashion. The site went on to describe his music as melodic: "drawing on the melodies of folk music, especially the Greek music of his homeland". Vangelis' music and compositions have also been described as "a distinctive sound with simple, repetitive yet memorable tunes against evocative rhythms and chord progressions".

In an interview with Soundtrack, a music and film website, Vangelis talked about his compositional processes. For films, Vangelis stated that he would begin composing a score for a feature as soon as he had seen a rough cut of the footage. In addition to working with synthesizers and other electronic instruments, Vangelis also worked with and conducted orchestras. For example, in the Oliver Stone film Alexander, Vangelis conducted an orchestra that consisted of various classical instruments including sitars, percussion, finger cymbals, harps, and duduks.

He explains his customary method of approach. As soon as the musical idea is there, as many keyboards as possible are connected to the control-desk, which in turn are directly connected to the applicable tracks of the multi-track machine. The idea now is to play as many keyboards as possible at the same time. That way, as broad a basis as possible develops, which only needs fine-tuning. After that it's a question of adding things or leaving out things.

While acknowledging that computers are "extremely helpful and amazing for a multitude of scientific areas", he described them as "insufficient and slow" for the immediate and spontaneous creation and, in terms of communication, "the worst thing that has happened for the performing musician". He considered that contemporary civilization is living in a cultural "dark age" of "musical pollution". He considered musical composing a science rather than an art, similar to Pythagoreanism. He had a mystical viewpoint on music as "one of the greatest forces in the universe", that the "music exists before we exist". His experience of music is a kind of synaesthesia.

== Instruments and equipment ==
As a musician who always composed and played primarily on keyboards, Vangelis relied heavily on synthesizers and other electronic approaches to music, although his first instrument was the piano. He also played and used many acoustic and folk instruments when required and was a keen percussionist (in addition to a standard drum kit, he performed on vibraphone, timpani, symphonic gongs and snare drums, various gamelan instruments, a tubular bell, a wind gong, a bell tree, and crotales). On several of his albums, he employed a live choir and classical soprano (usually Vana Veroutis).

I don't always play synthesizers. I play acoustic instruments with the same pleasure. I'm happy when I have unlimited choice; in order to do that, you need everything from simple acoustic sounds to electronic sounds. Sound is sound and vibration is vibration, whether from an electronic source or an acoustic instrument.

Vangelis' first electric keyboard was a Hammond B3 organ, while his first synthesizer was a Korg 700 monophonic. By his own admission, he never got rid of keyboards during the first two decades of his career, but accumulated new ones and simply stopped actively using the old ones once he had effective replacements or had exhausted their possibilities. By the mid-1970s, when based at his Nemo Studio in London, he was also using Elka Tornado IV Reed and Farfisa Syntorchestra organs, a Selmer Clavioline, a Hohner Clavinet D6, a Fender Rhodes 88 electric piano, a GR International Bandmaster Powerhouse 8-track drum machine, a Moog Satellite, and various synthesizers by Roland (SH-1000, SH-2000, and SH-3A) and Korg (MaxiKorg 800DV, MiniKorg 700, and 700s). From the mid-1970s onward he employed two grand pianos - an Imperial Bösendorfer and a Steinway & Sons Concert model.

Both grand pianos, the Roland SH-3A and the Rhodes 88 were retained for Vangelis' active late 1970s and early 1980s setup, which also featured newer synthesizers by Yamaha (CS-40M and GS-1), ARP Instruments (Pro Soloist, 2500, Odyssey), Oberheim Electronics (two, four and eight-voice Polyphonic Synthesizers), Sequential Circuits (Prophet-5 and Prophet-10), Roland (Jupiter-4, ProMars Compuphonic and the modular Systems 101, 102, and 104), a Korg Polyphonic Ensemble, an RSF Kobol Black Box, and a MiniMoog. Other studio equipment during this period included the Solina String Ensemble and EKO Stradivarius string synthesizers; sequencers by ARP, Roland (CSQ-100 and CSQ-600), and Oberheim (DS-2); drum machines by Simmons (SDSV), Korg (KR-55, Mini Pops 120), Roland (CR-5000 Compurhythm), and Linn (LM-1); vocoders by EMS (Vocoder 1000) and Roland (VP-330 VocoderPlus Mk. I); and the Dubrecq Stylophone 350S. Vangelis also added a Crumar Compac-piano and a Yamaha CP-80 to his piano set-up.

Vangelis' favourite keyboard was the Yamaha CS-80 polyphonic synthesizer, which he began using from 1977 and which allowed him to employ a distinctive and expressive vibrato technique by varying the pressure exerted on the key. He would use this instrument throughout the 1970s and 1980s to the point that its timbres, abilities, and idiosyncrasies became closely associated with his musical signature. In a 1984 interview, Vangelis described the CS-80 as "the most important synthesizer in my career – and for me the best analogue synthesizer design there has ever been... It needs a lot of practice if you want to be able to play it properly, but that's because it's the only synthesizer I could describe as being a real instrument, mainly because of the keyboard — the way it's built and what you can do with it."

For the mid-1980s, Vangelis retained his Roland modular systems and ProMars Compuphonic synthesizers, but added the SH-101 and JX8-P models, and the MKS-80 Super Jupiter rack mount module, as well as a Yamaha GS-1. Other holdovers from previous active setups were the Fender Rhodes 88 and Yamaha CP-80, the MiniMoog, the Prophet-10, and the grand pianos. For drum machines, he retained the Linn LM-1 but added an LM-2 LinnDrum and an E-mu SP-12; his chosen sequencers for this period were the Roland CSQ-600 and the ARP; and he upgraded to the Mk. II version of the Roland VP-330 VocoderPlus. Vangelis disliked programming-oriented sampling devices like the Fairlight CMI (considering them to be too far removed from being relatable instruments) and remained unimpressed by many of the later commercial 1980s polysynths such as the Yamaha DX7; however, he did use the E-mu Emulator sampler, in particular the Emulator II model.

For his final period at Nemo in the late 1980s, Vangelis also retained the Emulator II; the Prophet 10 (enhanced by the VS module); the GS-1, his grand pianos, and the CP-80 in active service along with the Roland ProMars Compuphonic, JX8-P, and VP-330 VocoderPlus (while mostly retiring the Fender Rhodes). He would also continue to use the SP-12 and LinnDrum as drum machines, adding the Sequential Circuits TOM. By this point, the Roland modular systems had also been retired, although he would retain the MKS-80 Super Jupiter and augment it with further MKS-20 and MKS-70 rack mount models as well as two further Roland keyboard synthesizers (the Jupiter-6 and the Juno-106). During this time, Vangelis also made a return to Korg keyboards (acquiring a DW-8000 and a Poly-800) as well as adding the Ensoniq Mirage to his sampler armoury. Sequencing was now handled by a Roland MSQ-700. Despite his stated disappointment with the Yamaha DX7, he still used it alongside the related modular TX7 version.

In 1988, Vangelis closed Nemo Studio and embarked on the more nomadic lifestyle he would continue for the rest of his life, moving between homes and hotels in different countries according to whim and circumstance. For this, he made a drastic switch to a portable, all-digital instrumental setup based around the Zyklus MIDI Performance System, which was first heard on his 1988 album Direct.

For the last part of his career, Vangelis used a custom keyboard set-up with built-in volume and mixing pedal controls, enabling him to improvise, play, arrange, and orchestrate his music live without overdubbing or needing to move from one sitting position. This ensemble, and the set-up he used for his irregular concert performances, appeared to be based around various Korg and Roland machines as well as the E-mu Proteus rack module.

== Honours and legacy ==
In 1989 Vangelis received the Max Steiner Award. France made him a Knight of the Order of the Arts and Letters in 1992 and promoted him to Commander in 2017, as well as Knight of the National Order of the Legion of Honour in 2001. In 1993 he received the music award Apollo by Friends of the Athens National Opera Society. In 1995, Vangelis had a minor planet named after him (6354 Vangelis) by the International Astronomical Union's Minor Planet Center (MPC) at the Smithsonian Astrophysical Observatory; the name was proposed by the MPC's co-director, Gareth V. Williams, rather than by the object's original discoverer, Eugène Joseph Delporte, who died in 1955, long before the 1934 discovery could be confirmed by observations made in 1990. In 1996 and 1997, Vangelis received awards at the World Music Awards.

NASA conferred their Public Service Medal to Vangelis in 2003. The award is the highest honour the space agency presents to an individual not involved with the American government. Five years later, in 2008, the board of the National and Kapodistrian University of Athens voted to award Vangelis an honorary doctoral degree, making him a professor emeritus at their Faculty of Primary Education. In June 2008, the American Hellenic Institute honoured Vangelis with an AHI Hellenic Heritage Achievement Award for his "exceptional artistic achievements" as a pioneer in electronic music and for his lifelong dedication to the promotion of Hellenism through the arts. On 16 September 2013, he received the honour of appearing on the Greek 80 cent postage stamp, as part of a series of six distinguished living personalities of the Greek Diaspora. In May 2018 the University of Thessaly in Vangelis' hometown of Volos awarded him an honorary doctorate degree in electrical and computer engineering.

The American Film Institute nominated Vangelis' scores for Blade Runner and Chariots of Fire for their list of the 25 greatest film scores.

== Discography ==
=== Studio albums ===
- Fais que ton rêve soit plus long que la nuit (1972)
- Earth (1973)
- Heaven and Hell (1975)
- Albedo 0.39 (1976)
- Spiral (1977)
- Beaubourg (1978)
- Hypothesis (1978; unofficial)
- The Dragon (1978; unofficial)
- China (1979)
- See You Later (1980)
- Soil Festivities (1984)
- Mask (1985)
- Invisible Connections (1985)
- Direct (1988)
- The City (1990)
- Foros Timis Ston Greco (1995)
- Voices (1995)
- Oceanic (1996)
- El Greco (1998)
- Mythodea – Music for the NASA Mission: 2001 Mars Odyssey (2001)
- Rosetta (2016)
- Nocturne: The Piano Album (2019)
- Juno to Jupiter (2021)

=== Soundtracks ===
- 5000 Lies (1966)
- L'Apocalypse des animaux (1973)
- Ignacio (aka "Do You hear the Dogs Barking?" and "Entends-tu les chiens aboyer") (1975)
- La Fête sauvage (1976)
- Opéra sauvage (1979)
- Chariots of Fire (1981)
- Blade Runner (1994; official)
- Antarctica (1983)
- The Bounty (1984)
- Francesco (1989)
- 1492: Conquest of Paradise (1992)
- Alexander (2004)
- Blade Runner Trilogy: 25th Anniversary (2007)
- El Greco: Original Motion Picture Soundtrack (2007)
- Chariots of Fire – The Play: Music from the Stage Show (2012)
