= Esoteric Recordings =

UK independent record label

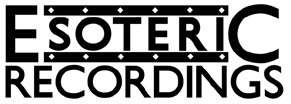
- Parent company: Cherry Red Records
- Founded: 2007
- Founder: Mark Powell
- Distributor: Proper Music Distribution
- Genre: Progressive rock
- Country of origin: United Kingdom
- Location: London, England
- Official website: esotericrecordings.com

Esoteric Recordings is a UK independent record label specialising in 1970s progressive rock, folk, psychedelic, and jazz-rock reissues as part of Cherry Red Records. Its releases include both catalogue reissues and new works from artists who share a similar musical heritage.

The label's founder is Mark Powell, who has been a freelance music consultant for Universal, Sony and EMI since 2000; he has also worked with Soft Machine, Caravan, Camel, Man, and Hawkwind, as well as producing label retrospectives covering Deram, Decca, Vertigo, Harvest and United Artists. His consultancy work led to the formation of an independent reissue label, originally called Eclectic Discs, to license overlooked releases he considered worthwhile but weren't of sufficient commercial stature to interest major labels. Other releases are sourced from the artists themselves, while the label has also been involved in the release of DVD material from artists including Barclay James Harvest.

Speaking in 2008, Powell said:

The inspiration is the way that labels like Island or Harvest worked between the late 60s and early 70s, whereby things could be stylistically different but appealed to a similar kind of audience. Some of the stuff will be folk, some jazzy stuff, some harder rock, some psychedelic, some electronic – the stuff that I suppose in that period was classed, loosely, as progressive. But that took in an awful lot of things. All of which I love personally, and it's really going through records I have or used to have, and think should be on CD. And luckily there are some people out there who share my view.

Among the label's releases have been box sets including the six-CD Jack Bruce Can You Follow? and the four-CD Bill Nelson Trial by Intimacy (The Book of Splendours) as well as standalone releases by artists including: Man, Claire Hamill, The Keef Hartley Band, Egg, Michael Moorcock, Gary Farr, Daevid Allen, and Rare Bird.

In 2012, Esoteric Recordings started a front line record label, Esoteric Antenna, which put out the debut album by Squackett (Steve Hackett and Chris Squire) called A Life Within a Day. It has also signed the Oxford-based band Sanguine Hum and guitarist Matt Stevens (of The Fierce and the Dead).

== Signed artists ==
- Daevid Allen
- Anderson Bruford Wakeman Howe
- Tony Banks
- Barclay James Harvest
- Blossom Toes
- Arthur Brown
- Jack Bruce
- Camel
- Curved Air
- Disco Jets
- Egg
- East of Eden
- Gary Farr
- Bill Fay
- FM
- Keef Hartley Band
- Claire Hamill
- Hawkwind
- Matt Stevens (musician) (of The Fierce and the Dead)
- Love Sculpture
- Man
- Mellow Candle
- Michael Moorcock
- Morgan
- Morgan Fisher and Lol Coxhill
- Bill Nelson
- Procol Harum
- Rare Bird
- Todd Rundgren
- Space Ritual
- Squackett
- Supersister
- Tangerine Dream
- Wigwam
- Chris Wood
