= Nemo Studios =

Former recording studio in London, England

Coordinates: 51.5149°N 0.1617°W

Nemo Studios was a recording studio in London, planned, built and used by Greek composer Vangelis between 1975 and 1987. Numerous highlights of Vangelis' career were composed in Nemo, including soundtracks for Ridley Scott's Blade Runner, and Hugh Hudson's Chariots of Fire (the soundtrack for which he won an Oscar).

Vangelis' equipment included more than 20 synthesizers and acoustic keyboard instruments, as well as numerous percussion instruments.

The studio was located on the second floor of the former Hampden Gurney Primary School building. Brian Jackson (actor) owned and ran several TV production and international distribution companies from his photographic, film & recording studios at the Hampden Gurney Studios complex near Marble Arch. The building no longer exists.

== Equipment ==
In the 1982 Keyboard magazine interview several instruments were noted: a Minimoog, Yamaha CS-40M synthesiser, Roland CSQ-100 digital sequencer, Yamaha CP-80 electric grand, Roland Compuphonic synthesiser, modified vintage Fender Rhodes electric piano, CSQ-600 digital sequencer, Roland VP-330 vocoder / string machine, Roland CR-5000 Compurhythm, Yamaha CS-80 synthesiser, E-mu Emulator, Sequential Circuits Prophet-5 and Prophet-10, Simmons SDSV drum machine, Linn LM-1 drum computer, Roland Jupiter-4, nine-foot Steinway grand piano, Yamaha GS-2, 24-track Quad-8 Pacifica mixing console, and an RSF one-octave Blackbox synthesiser. There were also three timpani, a trap drum set, and rows of gongs, chimes, and exotic bells.
