= Vangelis discography =

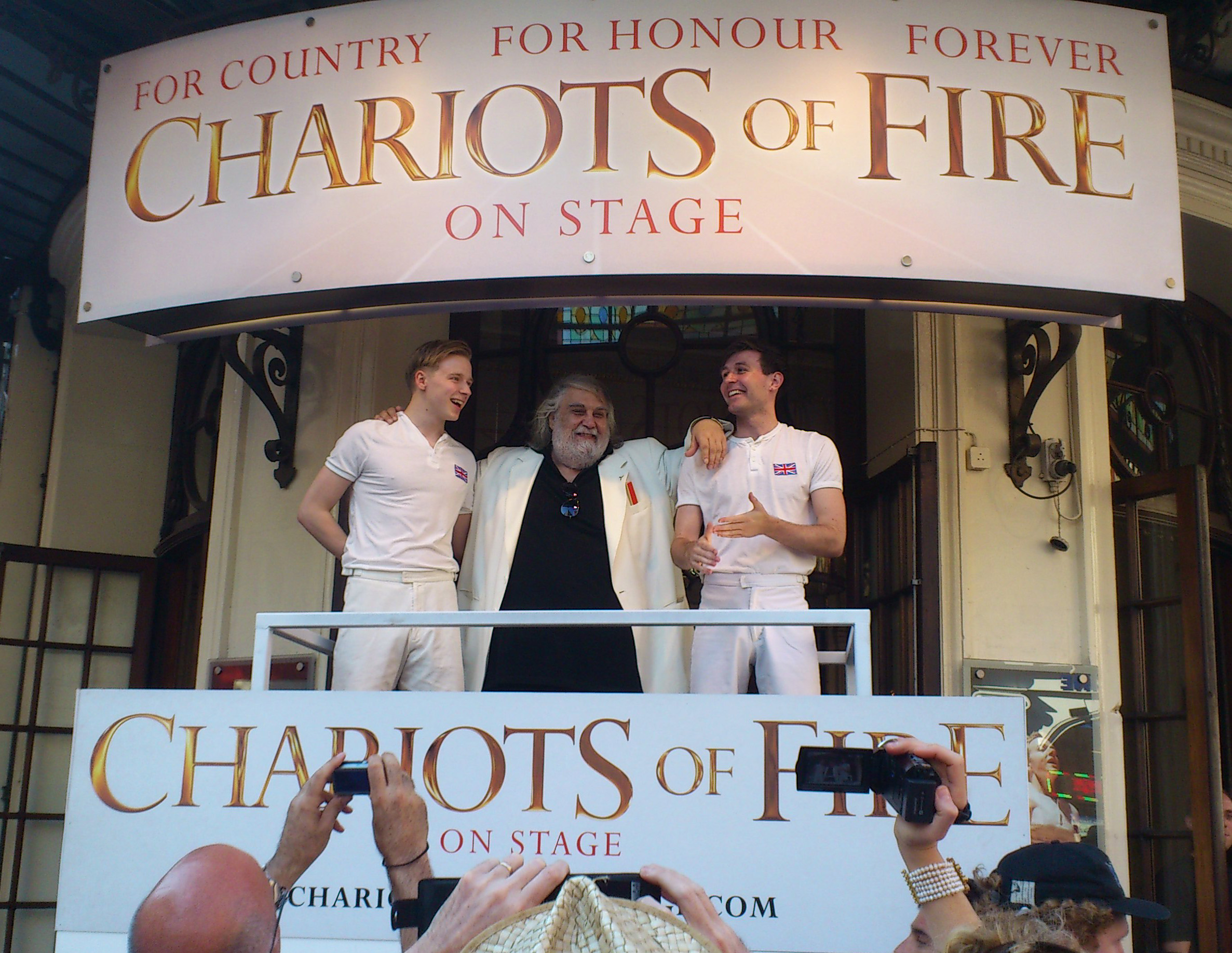
Vangelis and cast members watch the Olympic torch pass the Gielgud Theater, London 26 July 2012.

Vangelis, a Greek musician, composer, and record producer, began his music career in the 1960s with the Greek progressive rock band Aphrodite's Child and in the 1970s began composing electronic music. He gained mainstream popularity after composing soundtracks for the films Chariots of Fire (1981) and Blade Runner (1982). His solo career consists of 23 studio albums, 26 compilation albums, 12 soundtrack albums, and roughly 29 singles. The majority of his film, documentary, theatre, and ballet & dance scores were not officially released. He also collaborated with Jon Anderson and as a duo, released 4 studio albums, 2 compilations, and 13 singles and released two studio albums with Irene Papas.

His solo studio album Heaven and Hell (1975) was his UK chart debut (#31), while Albedo 0.39 (1976) his first top 20 album. His best selling studio albums are China (1979), certified silver for selling over 60,000 copies by BPI, Voices (1995) selling almost 300,000 certified copies in Germany and Austria, and Mythodea (2001) certified platinum in Greece and silver in Portugal. His compilation albums also had good sales, with Themes (1989) selling over 445,000 copies, Portraits (So Long Ago, So Clear) (1996) selling over a million copies in Europe, and Odyssey: The Definitive Collection (2003) over 110,000 copies. His best selling soundtracks are Opéra sauvage (1979) which reached #42 on the Billboard 200 and stayed in the charts for 39 weeks, Chariots of Fire (1981) which topped the Billboard 200 for 4 weeks and sold 2 million copies worldwide, Blade Runner (1994) which sold over 250,000 copies, 1492: Conquest of Paradise (1992) which topped the charts in Europe and sold 3 million copies worldwide, and Alexander (2004) which was certified platinum in Hungary.

His solo single "Chariots of Fire" in 1982 topped the Billboard Hot 100, "Conquest of Paradise" (1992) topped the charts in Europe and sold over 1.6 million copies, and "Anthem", the theme music for the 2002 FIFA World Cup reached the top 5 in Japan and was certified platinum by RIAJ.

== Studio albums ==
Year	Album details	Peak chart positions								
Year	Album details	AUT	FRA	GER	ITA	NLD	SWE	SWI	UK	US
1972	Fais que ton rêve soit plus long que la nuit (lit. "Make Your Dream Last Longer Than the Night"): Released: 1972; Label: Reprise, # 54009 (LP); Format: LP album	—	—	—	—	—	—	—	—	—
1973	Earth: Released: October 1973; Label: Vertigo, # 6499 693 (LP); Format: CD in 1996	—	—	—	—	—	—	—	—	—
1975	Heaven and Hell: Released: November 1975; Label: RCA (original) / Windham Hill (reissue); Format: CD, LP album	—	—	—	—	—	—	—	31	204
1976	Albedo 0.39: Released: September 1976; Label: Windham Hill RCA (LP) # 3017; Format: CD, LP album	—	—	—	—	—	—	—	18	—
1977	Spiral: Released: December 1977; Label: RCA #3022 (LP); Format: CD, LP album	—	—	—	—	38	—	—	—	—
1978	Beaubourg: Released: July 1978; Label: Windham Hill RCA (LP) # INTS 5158; Format: CD, LP album	—	—	—	—	—	—	—	—	—
1979	China: Released: April 1979; Label: Polydor (LP) POLD 5018(CS) 813653-4; Format: CD, LP album	—	—	—	—	31	—	—	—	—
1980	See You Later: Released: November 1980; Label: Polydor; Format: CD, LP album	—	—	—	—	—	—	—	—	—
1984	Soil Festivities: Released: October 1984; Label: Polydor; Format: CD, LP album	—	—	—	—	45	—	—	55	—
1985	Mask: Released: March 1985; Label: Polydor; Format: CD, LP album	—	—	—	—	—	—	—	69	—
1985	Invisible Connections: Released: March 1985; Label: Deutsche Grammophon; Format: CD, LP album	—	—	—	—	—	—	—	—	—
1988	Direct: Released: September 1988; Label: Arista; Format: CD, LP album	—	—	—	—	—	33	—	—	—
1990	The City: Released: November 1990; Label: EastWest / Atlantic; Format: CD, LP album	—	—	—	—	82	—	—	—	—
1995	Voices: Released: October 1995; Label: EastWest / Atlantic; Format: CD, LP album	6	—	24	—	36	50	31	58	—
1996	Oceanic: Released: October 1996; Label: EastWest / Atlantic; Format: CD, LP album	22	29	87	—	98	60	37	—	—
1998	El Greco: Released: October 1998; Label: EastWest / Atlantic; Format: CD, LP album	—	66	74	—	—	—	—	159	—
2001	Mythodea — Music for the NASA Mission: 2001 Mars Odyssey: Released: October 2001; Label: Sony Classical; Format: CD	—	—	46	39	—	—	75	—	—
2016	Rosetta: Released: September 2016; Label: Decca; Format: CD, LP	58	31	55	30	33	—	29	40	—
2019	Nocturne: The Piano Album: Released: January 2019; Label: Decca; Format: CD, LP	—	141	—	—	116	—	33	—	—
2021	Juno to Jupiter: Released: September 2021; Label: Decca; Format: CD, LP	—	—	—	—	31	—	21	—	—
"—" denotes releases that did not chart or receive certification.

== Unofficial albums ==
Strictly not bootleg recordings as they appeared on a label, but they were released without Vangelis' permission and were later withdrawn from the market.

- (1978) Hypothesis
- (1978) The Dragon

== Soundtracks ==
- (1970) Sex-Power - LP of the film by Henry Chapier (France)
- (1973) L'Apocalypse des animaux
- (1975) Entends-tu les chiens aboyer?; re-issued as Ignacio (1977)
- (1976) La Fête sauvage
- (1979) Opéra sauvage
- (1981) Chariots of Fire
- (1983) Antarctica
- (1984) The Bounty
- (1992) 1492: Conquest of Paradise
- (1994) Blade Runner
- (2004) Alexander
- (2007) Blade Runner Trilogy. 25th Anniversary; 3-CD set featuring the remastered 1994 release, previously unreleased music from the film, and new music inspired by the film
- (2007) El Greco - Original Motion Picture Soundtrack (not to be confused with the 1998 album El Greco)
- (2008) Świadectwo - muzyka filmowa - for the Polish-Italian film Świadectwo by Paweł Pitera
  - Vangelis - Part 1: "Sanctus" (4:34), "In Aeternitatem" (1:58), "Humanum Est" (3:08); all other tracks by Robert Janson

== Limited release albums ==
- (1984) Silent Portraits - LP album in a book of portraits - print run: 600
- (1995) Foros Timis Ston Greco - CD album included in a book about Greek painter El Greco - print run: 3,000; later expanded and put in general release as El Greco (1998)

== Collaboration albums ==
- (1968) 1965-1968 - Vangelis & The Forminx
- (1974) E tu... - Claudio Baglioni
- (1976) Phos - Socrates
- (1977) Chinese Restaurant - Krisma (Chrisma) (Note: Vangelis' brother, Niko Papathanassiou, performs on these albums)
- (1977) The Demis Roussos Magic - Demis Roussos
- (1979) Odes - Irene Papas
- (1979) Hibernation - Krisma (Chrisma)
- (1980) Short Stories - Jon and Vangelis
- (1981) The Friends of Mr Cairo - Jon and Vangelis
- (1981) Ich Hab' Keine Angst (German lyrics) / Moi, je n'ai pas peur (French lyrics) - Milva
- (1983) Private Collection - Jon and Vangelis
- (1984) Reflection - Demis Roussos
- (1984) The Velocity of Love - Suzanne Ciani
- (1986) Rapsodies - Irene Papas
- (1986) Geheimnisse (German lyrics) / Tra Due Sogni (Italian lyrics) - Milva
- (1991) Page of Life (U.S. and European versions) - Jon and Vangelis
- (1996) A Separate Affair - Neuronium
- (1998) Another Page of Life - Jon and Vangelis

== Compilation albums ==
- (1978) The Best of Vangelis
- (1981) Greatest Hits
- (1982) To the Unknown Man Vol. 1
- (1982) To the Unknown Man Vol. 2
- (1984) The Best of Jon and Vangelis - Jon and Vangelis
- (1989) Themes
- (1991) Greatest Hits (Europe 2xCD, Dutch 1xCD)
- (1992) Best of Vangelis (Spain)
- (1994) Chronicles - Jon and Vangelis
- (1994) Best Selection (Japan)
- (1994) The Collection
- (1995) Themes II (France)
- (1995) Space Themes (Italy)
- (1995) Best in Space (UK, Germany)
- (1995) Mundo Magico de Vangelis
- (1996) Gift... (UK)
- (1996) Portraits (So Long Ago, So Clear)
- (1997) The Best of Vangelis
- (1999) Reprise 1990-1999
- (2002) Cosmos (Belgium)
- (2002) The Best of Vangelis
- (2003) The Best of Vangelis (Belgium)
- (2003) Odyssey: The Definitive Collection
- (2012) The Collection
- (2013) Light & Shadow
- (2016) Delectus
- (2026) La Petite Fille de la Mer

== Singles and EPs ==
Year	Title	Peak chart positions				Album
Year	Title	UK	NLD	JPN	GER	Album
1970	"Djemilla" (Note: released in France)	—	—	—	—	Sex Power - soundtrack
1973	"Come On" (Note: released in France)	—	—	—	—	Earth
1976	"Thème D'Amour" (Note: released in France)	—	—	—	—	La Fête sauvage
1976	"Pulstar"	—	—	—	—	Albedo 0.39
1977	"Ignacio - Part I" (Note: released in France)	—	—	—	—	Ignacio
1977	"Dervish D" (Note: released in France)	—	—	—	—	Spiral
1978	"To the Unknown Man"	—	38	—	—	Spiral
1979	"The Long March"	—	—	—	—	China
1979	"The Tao of Love" (Note: released in Australia)	—	—	—	—	China
1979	"Hymne" (Note: released in Netherlands)	—	—	—	—	Opéra sauvage
1979	"L'Enfant" (Note: released in France)	—	—	—	—	Opéra sauvage
1980	"Don't Be Foolish"	—	—	—	—	non-album single
1980	"My Love"	—	—	—	—	non-album single
1981	"Not a Bit - All of It" (Note: released in Spain)	—	—	—	—	See You Later
1981	"Chariots of Fire - Titles" (Note: Hit # 1 US Billboard charts and #4 in Canada)	12	17	55	—	Chariots of Fire
1981	"Theme from the TV-series 'Cosmos'" (Note: "Third Movement from 'Heaven and Hell'")	48	—	—	—	Heaven And Hell
1982	"Blade Runner - End Title"	—	—	—	—	Blade Runner
1983	"Theme from Antarctica" (Note: released in Japan)	—	—	66	—	Antarctica
1988	"The Will of the Wind"	—	—	—	—	Direct
1989	"Missing" (Note: released in Germany and Netherlands)	—	—	—	—	Themes
1992	"Conquest of Paradise" (Note: Dutch chart entry in March 1995)	60	1	—	1	1492: Conquest of Paradise
1993	"Twenty Eighth Parallel" (Note: released in France and Germany)	—	—	—	—	1492: Conquest of Paradise
1995	"Voices"	—	—	—	25	Voices
1996	"Ask the Mountains"	77	—	—	—	Voices
1996	"Sauvage et Beau"	—	—	—	—	Portraits
1996	"Song of the Seas"	—	—	—	—	Oceanic
1997	"March with Me" (Note: with Montserrat Caballe)	—	—	—	67	non-album single
2001	"Mythodea"	—	—	—	—	Mythodea — Music for the NASA Mission: 2001 Mars Odyssey
2002	"Anthem - 2002 FIFA World Cup Official Anthem"	98	—	5	75	non-album single
"—" denotes releases that did not chart or were not released in that territory.

== Singles released under pseudonyms ==
- (1971) "Astral Abuse"/"Who Killed", as Alpha Beta
- (1974) "Who"/"Sad Face", as Odyssey
- (1975) "Bird of Love"/"The Pawn", as the band Humanity (including Silver Koulouris, Michael Haubrich, F. R. David)
- (1978) "Red Square", as Richard Broadbaker - Mama O'

== Other works ==
=== Film scores ===
- (1963) O adelfos mou... o trohonomos (aka My Brother, the Traffic Policeman) (1963) directed by Filippos Fylaktos (Greece)
- (1966) 5.000 psemmata (aka 5,000 lies) by Giorgos Konstantinou (Greece)
- (1971) Frenitis by Giannis Hristodoulou (Greece)
- (1972) Salut, Jerusalem by Henry Chapier (France)
- (1974) Amore by Henry Chapier (France)
- (1975) Crime and Passion (aka Ace Up My Sleeve) by Ivan Passer (UK, West Germany)
- (1978) De Mantel der Liefde by Adriaan Ditvoorst (Netherlands)
- (1980) Mater amatísima by José Antonio Salgot (Spain)
- (1980) Prkosna delta by Vesna Ljubić (Yugoslavia)
- (1982) Missing by Costa-Gavras (USA); main theme appears in compilations Themes, Odyssey: The Definitive Collection and The Collection
- (1984) The Bounty by Roger Donaldson (UK); "Opening Titles" and "Closing Titles" appear in compilation Themes, and "Opening Titles" in Odyssey: The Definitive Collection
- (1985) Wonders of Life by Ed Kong (USA, Hong Kong)
- (1988) Vampire in Venice by Augusto Caminito (Italy)
- (1989) Francesco by Liliana Cavani (Italy, West Germany); iTunes has the "Suite from the Motion Picture 'Francesco' (feat. Dominik Hauser)". An unofficial special limited edition CD was released by Andromeda Music in 2002 (AMO103).
- (1992) Bitter Moon by Roman Polanski (France, UK, USA); "Main Theme" appeared in compilations Reprise 1990–1999 and The Collection, while iTunes has the "Suite from the Motion Picture 'Bitter Moon' (feat. Dominik Hauser)"
- (1992) La Peste by Luis Puenzo (France/UK/Argentina); "Psalmus Ode" appears in compilation Reprise 1990-1999
- (1996) Kavafis (aka Cavafy) by Yannis Smaragdis (Greece); "Main Theme" appear in Odyssey - The Definitive Collection
- (2001) I Hope by Marcello Daciano (US)
- (2014) Twilight of Shadows by Mohammed Lakhdar-Hamina (Algeria)

=== Documentary scores ===
- (1974) Georges Mathieu ou la Fureur d'Être by Frédéric Rossif (France)
- (1975) Georges Braque ou le Temps Différent by Frédéric Rossif (France)
- (1980) Death of a Princess by Antony Thomas (UK)
- (1981) Pablo Picasso, Peintre by Frédéric Rossif (France)
- (1984) Sauvage et Beau by Frédéric Rossif (France); "Sauvage et Beau" appear in Sauvage et Beau EP (1986) and compilation Portraits (So Long Ago, So Clear).
- (1986) Carl Sagan's Cosmos (USA)
- (1989) De Nuremberg à Nuremberg by Frédéric Rossif (France)
- (1990) Mouseio Goulandri Fysikis Istorias by Giorgos Kolozis (Greece)
- (1991) Viaggio in Italia by Gabriella Rosaleva (Italy)
- (1992) Cousteau's Rediscovery of the World II by Jacques Cousteau (France)
  - episodes "Indonésie I: Les Vergers de l'Enfer" and "Indonésie II: Sumatra"
- (1998) Microneurosurgery with videotapes: Spinal Space-Occupying Lesions by Dr. Stergios Tegos (Greece); medical publication in 3 videotapes, with nearly 12 hours of music
- (2011) Rupture: A Matter of Life OR Death by Hugh Hudson (UK)
- (2012) Trashed by Candida Brady (UK)
- (2017) Cousteau Divers Mini 5: Boiling Ocean by Pierre-Yves Cousteau (France)
- (2022) Nuclear Now by Oliver Stone (USA)
- (2023) We Are Stardust by Dionysis Simopoulos (Greece)
- (2024) Beyond, Ode to the Earth by André Kuipers (Netherlands)

=== Theatre music ===
- (1983) Elektra (Greece)
- (1992) Medea (Spain)
- (1997) IAAF - World Athletics with Montserrat Caballé (Athens) (Greece)
- (2001) Las Troyanas (Spain)
- (2002) A Vihar (The Tempest) (Hungary); "Jupiter Rex" appears in Juno to Jupiter
- (2003) Le Troiane Ed Ecuba (Italy)
- (2005) Antigone (Italy)
- (2011) A message of hope with Angela Gheorghiu & Roberto Alagna (Doha) (Qatar)
- (2012) Chariots Of Fire: The Play (UK)

=== Ballet & dance music ===
- (1983) R.B. Sque (UK)
- (1985) Frankenstein - Modern Prometheus (UK, Netherlands)
- (1986) The Beauty and the Beast (UK)
- (2013) The Beauty and the Beast (Russia)
- (2019) The Thread (UK)

== Videography ==
=== Video album ===
Title	Video details
Mythodea — Music for the NASA Mission: 2001 Mars Odyssey	Released: February 17, 2002; Studio: Sony Music CMG; Format: DVD, VHS

=== Music videos ===
Year	Title	Album
1978	"China" ● "The Dragon" ● "The Long March" ● "The Tao of Love"	China
1981	"Chariots of Fire - Titles"	Chariots of Fire
1992	"Conquest of Paradise"	1492: Conquest of Paradise
1995	"Voices"	Voices
2001	"Mythodea"	Mythodea — Music for the NASA Mission: 2001 Mars Odyssey
