= The Collection (Vangelis album) =

Compilation album by Vangelis
- Released: 23 July 2012
- Recorded: Electric Light Studios (Mastered)
- Genre: Electronica, Classical
- Length: 2:35:27
- Label: Rhino UK
- Producer: Vangelis

Vangelis chronology
El Greco (2007)	The Collection (2012)	Chariots of Fire: Music from the Stage Show (2012)

The Collection is compilation album by Greek composer Vangelis, released on 23 July 2012.

== Overview ==
The 2xCD compilation was released in order to coincide with the 2012 Summer Olympics, where Vangelis's music from Chariots of Fire was used. The compilation includes 31 tracks from his scores, solo albums and collaborations. The new unreleased track "Remembering" is a mix of ethereal chimes with jovial saxophone. "Blade Runner (Main Titles)" appears in extended form for the first time on an official release.

== Reception ==
Professional ratings
Review scores
Source	Rating
Record Collector	4/5 stars
Daily Express	3/5 stars

The compilation has generally received positive reviews. Jonny Trunk of Record Collector noted that the track "Remembering" was previously unreleased, that the album includes some obvious classics, "mixed in with some of the lesser-known but equally worthy cues, such as the superb "Theme From Bitter Moon" ... Also great are the inclusion of instrumentals such as "Petite Fille de La Mer" and "To The Unknown Man", works from Vangelis' 70s back catalogue", and gave it 4/5 stars.

Mike Diver of BBC commented that the album is "welcomed as an entry point for absolute beginners", but "it might not be the most important of the choices contained herein", as there's much material from Blade Runner, the songs with Jon Anderson "have not dated amazingly well", and rather "more splendid-sounding in the 21st century is "La Petite Fille de la mer", written back in 1973".

== Track listing ==
CD 1
No.	Title	Original release	Length
1.	"Conquest of Paradise"	1492: Conquest of Paradise	4:53
2.	"Titles"	Chariots of Fire	3:29
3.	"End Titles"	Blade Runner	4:38
4.	"Pulstar"	Albedo 0.39	5:46
5.	"Eternal Alexander"	Alexander	4:36
6.	"Anthem"	The Official Album of the 2002 FIFA World Cup	2:57
7.	"Line Open"	1492: Conquest of Paradise	4:27
8.	"To the Unknown Man"	Spiral	5:42
9.	"Hymne"	Opéra sauvage	2:41
10.	"Voices"	Voices	6:58
11.	"Up and Running"	Blade Runner Trilogy	3:09
12.	"Main Titles"	Blade Runner	5:32
13.	"Tears in Rain"	Blade Runner	3:02
14.	"So Long Ago, So Clear"	Heaven and Hell	5:01
15.	"I'll Find My Way Home" (Jon & Vangelis)	The Friends of Mr Cairo	4:29
16.	"State of Independence" (Jon & Vangelis)	The Friends of Mr Cairo	5:00
17.	"I Hear You Now" (Jon & Vangelis)	Short Stories	5:13

CD 2
No.	Title	Original release	Length
1.	"Rachel's Song"	Blade Runner	4:47
2.	"Missing"	Missing	3:55
3.	"Love Theme From Blade Runner"	Blade Runner	4:54
4.	"Ask the Mountains"	Voices	7:53
5.	"Theme From Bitter Moon"	Bitter Moon	3:38
6.	"Dream in an Open Place"	Voices	5:50
7.	"Twenty Eighth Parallel"	1492: Conquest of Paradise	5:11
8.	"Memories of Green"	See You Later	5:04
9.	"La Petite Fille de La Mer"	L'Apocalypse des animaux	5:52
10.	"Song of the Seas"	Oceanic	5:55
11.	"Memories of Blue"	Oceanic	5:28
12.	"L'Enfant"	Opéra sauvage	4:53
13.	"Echoes"	Voices	8:19
14.	"Remembering"	New track	6:29

== Charts ==
Chart (2012)	Peak position
Belgian Albums Chart	40
Netherlands Albums Chart	79
Spanish Albums Chart	93
UK Albums Chart	29

2022 chart performance for The Collection
Chart (2022)	Peak position
Swiss Albums (Schweizer Hitparade)	24

== Certifications ==
Certifications for The Collection
Region	Certification	Certified units/sales
United Kingdom (BPI)	Silver	60,000^{‡}
^{‡} Sales+streaming figures based on certification alone.

== Personnel ==
- Dan Massie – Mastering
- Vangelis Saitis – Engineer
- Andy Tribe – Project Manager
- Dmitris Tsakas – Saxophone
- Vangelis – Arranger, composer, primary artist, producer
- Stathis Zalidis – Photography
