= Odyssey: The Definitive Collection =

Compilation album by Vangelis
- Released: November 4, 2003
- Recorded: 1973–2003
- Genre: Electronic, classical, new-age
- Length: 1:18:43
- Label: Universal
- Producer: Vangelis

Vangelis chronology
Mythodea (2001)	Odyssey: The Definitive Collection (2003)	Alexander (2004)

Professional ratings
Review scores
Source	Rating
Allmusic	4/5 stars

Odyssey: The Definitive Collection is a 2003 compilation album of works by Greek electronic composer and artist Vangelis. It includes two previously unreleased tracks: the opening theme from the film Cavafy and a new composition called "Celtic Dawn". All tracks were remastered.

== Track listing ==
Track	Title	Time	From album	Year	Notes
1	Pulstar	5:24	Albedo 0.39	1976	edited version
2	Hymn	2:43	Opéra sauvage	1979	originally titled "Hymne"
3	Theme from Chariots of Fire	3:31	Chariots of Fire	1981	originally titled "Titles"
4	Main Theme from Missing	3:57	Themes	1989	
5	Love Theme from Blade Runner	4:54	Blade Runner	1989	
6	End Titles from Blade Runner	4:10	Blade Runner	1989	edited version
7	The Tao of Love	2:19	China	1979	edited version
8	Theme from Antarctica	3:52	Antarctica	1983	edited version
9	Main Theme from Cavafy	2:49		1996	previously unreleased
10	Opening Titles from Mutiny on the Bounty	3:52	Themes	1989	edited version
11	Conquest of Paradise	6:08	1492: Conquest of Paradise	1992	includes "Opening" from the same album
12	La Petite Fille De La Mer	5:54	L'Apocalypse des Animaux	1973	
13	L'Enfant	4:57	Opéra sauvage	1979	
14	Alpha	5:13	Albedo 0.39	1976	on the US/UK version; edited version
14	Anthem - FIFA World Cup 2002	2:58		2002	not on the US/UK version, previously only released as a single
15	Celtic Dawn	4:06		2003	previously unreleased
16	Movement 1 from Mythodea	5:23	Mythodea: Music for the NASA Mission: 2001 Mars Odyssey	2001	edited version
17	I'll Find My Way Home	4:30	The Friends of Mr Cairo	1981	bonus track; performed by Jon & Vangelis
18	State of Independence (single edit)	4:59	The Friends of Mr Cairo	1981	bonus track; performed by Jon & Vangelis

Track listing note: on some editions, "L'Enfant" is misprinted as being from L'Apocalypse des Animaux.

== Charts ==
Chart (2003–2004)	Peak position
Belgium Albums Chart	23
Netherlands Albums Chart	68
Finland Albums Chart	37
Italy Albums Chart	45
Norway Albums Chart	14
Portugal Albums Chart	8
Sweden Albums Chart	29
Switzerland Albums Chart	89
UK Albums Chart	20
Billboard New Age Albums	11

== Certifications ==
Region	Certification	Certified units/sales
Hungary (MAHASZ)	Gold	10,000^{^}
United Kingdom (BPI)	Gold	100,000^{^}
^{^} Shipments figures based on certification alone.
