= Themes (Vangelis album) =

Compilation album by Vangelis
- Released: July 1989
- Genre: Electronic, new age
- Length: 63:21
- Label: Polydor
- Producer: Vangelis

Vangelis chronology
Direct (1988)	Themes (1989)	The City (1990)

Professional ratings
Review scores
Source	Rating
Allmusic	link

Themes is a compilation album of works by Greek electronic composer and artist Vangelis released in July 1989. It featured some previously released tracks from Vangelis's other albums, as well as some pieces from movie soundtracks that had not previously been released.

The album is notable because it marked the first official appearances of Vangelis' music from the films Blade Runner, The Bounty, and Missing. Of these three film scores, only the Blade Runner soundtrack has since received an official release.

== Track listing ==
No.	Title	Original release	Length
1.	"End Titles"	previously unreleased, from the film Blade Runner	4:57
2.	"Main Theme"	previously unreleased, from the film Missing	3:59
3.	"L'Enfant"	Opéra sauvage	5:00
4.	"Hymn"	Opéra sauvage	2:45
5.	"Chung Kuo"	China	5:29
6.	"The Tao of Love"	China	2:45
7.	"Theme from Antarctica"	Antarctica	3:55
8.	"Love Theme"	previously unreleased, from the film Blade Runner	4:55
9.	"Opening Titles from The Bounty"	previously unreleased, from the film The Bounty	4:16
10.	"Closing Titles from The Bounty"	previously unreleased, from the film The Bounty	4:58
11.	"Memories of Green"	See You Later	5:42
12.	"La Petite Fille de la Mer"	L'Apocalypse des animaux	5:51
13.	"Five Circles"	Chariots of Fire	5:18
14.	"Chariots of Fire"	Chariots of Fire	3:31

== Charts ==
Chart performance for Themes
Chart (1989–1990)	Peak position
Australian Albums (ARIA)	46
Belgian Albums (Ultratop Flanders)	39
Dutch Albums (Album Top 100)	25
German Albums (Offizielle Top 100)	46
Swedish Albums (Sverigetopplistan)	25
Swiss Albums (Schweizer Hitparade)	20
UK Albums (OCC)	11
US Billboard New Age Albums	10

== Certifications ==
Region	Certification	Certified units/sales
Argentina (CAPIF)	2× Platinum	120,000^{^}
France (SNEP)	2× Gold	200,000^{*}
Switzerland (IFPI Switzerland)	Gold	25,000^{^}
United Kingdom (BPI)	Gold	100,000^{^}
^{*} Sales figures based on certification alone.^{^} Shipments figures based on certification alone.
