= Portraits (So Long Ago, So Clear) =

Compilation album by Vangelis
- Released: March 11, 1996
- Recorded: 1973–1992
- Genre: Electronica, classical, new-age
- Length: 74:40
- Label: Polygram
- Producer: Vangelis

Vangelis chronology
Oceanic (1996)	Portraits (So Long Ago, So Clear) (1996)	El Greco (1998)

Professional ratings
Review scores
Source	Rating
Allmusic	2.5/5 stars

Portraits (So Long Ago, So Clear) is a 1996 compilation album of works by Greek electronic composer and artist Vangelis.

The album features some of the most-renowned Vangelis' solo work, as well as songs from Jon & Vangelis, his collaboration with Yes vocalist Jon Anderson.

== Track listing ==
All songs were written by Vangelis, except where noted.

No.	Title	Original release	Length
1.	"To the Unknown Man"	Spiral	6:33
2.	"Italian Song" (Jon and Vangelis)	Private Collection	2:49
3.	"Pulstar"	Albedo 0.39	5:37
4.	"La Petite Fille de la Mer"	L'Apocalypse des animaux	5:48
5.	"Alpha"	Albedo 0.39	5:32
6.	"I Hear You Now" (Jon and Vangelis)	Short Stories	5:05
7.	"I'll Find My Way Home" (Jon and Vangelis)	The Friends of Mr Cairo	4:26
8.	"State of Independence" (Jon and Vangelis)	The Friends of Mr Cairo	6:07
9.	"Himalaya"	China	6:50
10.	"Conquest of Paradise"	1492: Conquest of Paradise	5:30
11.	"Hymn" (New version first performed at Night of Poetry and Eureka concert 1991)	Previously unreleased	5:05
12.	"Antarctica"	Antarctica	3:43
13.	"Sauvage et Beau" (Previously unreleased)	Previously unreleased	3:17
14.	"Chariots of Fire"	Chariots of Fire	3:22
15.	"So Long Ago, So Clear" (with Jon Anderson)	Heaven and Hell	4:56

== Charts ==
=== Weekly charts ===
Weekly chart performance for Portraits (So Long Ago, So Clear)
Chart (1996)	Peak position
Australian Albums (ARIA)	58
Austrian Albums (Ö3 Austria)	3
Belgian Albums (Ultratop Flanders)	4
Belgian Albums (Ultratop Wallonia)	5
Dutch Albums (Album Top 100)	4
German Albums (Offizielle Top 100)	13
Hungarian Albums (MAHASZ)	12
Portuguese Albums Chart	1
Swedish Albums (Sverigetopplistan)	59
Swiss Albums (Schweizer Hitparade)	7
UK Albums (Official Charts)	14
US Billboard New Age Albums	8

=== Year-end charts ===
Year-end chart performance for Portraits (So Long Ago, So Clear)
Chart (1996)	Position
German Albums Chart	89

== Certifications ==
Region	Certification	Certified units/sales
Austria (IFPI Austria)	Gold	25,000^{*}
Belgium (BRMA)	Gold	25,000^{*}
France (SNEP)	Gold	100,000^{*}
Spain (Promusicae)	Gold	50,000^{^}
Switzerland (IFPI Switzerland)	Gold	25,000^{^}
United Kingdom (BPI)	Silver	60,000^{*}
Summaries
Europe (IFPI)	Platinum	1,000,000
^{*} Sales figures based on certification alone.^{^} Shipments figures based on certification alone.
