= Oceanic (Vangelis album) =

Studio album by Vangelis
- Released: 28 October 1996
- Genres: Electronica, ambient, new-age
- Length: 50:42
- Label: East West (Europe) / Atlantic (USA)
- Producer: Vangelis

Vangelis chronology
Voices (1995)	Oceanic (1996)	Portraits (So Long Ago, So Clear) (1996)

Oceanic is a 1996 studio album by Greek electronic composer Vangelis. It was released in Europe on 28 October 1996, by East West Records and in the United States in January 1997, by Atlantic Records. A single "Song of the Seas", with b-side "Aquatic Dance", was released simultaneously.

== Overview ==
Vangelis was personally involved in the sleeve design, as he used to be in the late seventies and early eighties. At the end of the album inside liner notes there are references to the films Million Dollar Mermaid and Footlight Parade, as the cover design features images taken from these two movies.

The music was used in the 1998 documentary Deep Sea, Deep Secrets co-produced by The Learning Channel and Discovery Channel, together with music from Vangelis' previous album, Voices.

It was his first album nominated for a Grammy Award in Best New Age Album category. The second was the album Rosetta, in 2017.

== Composition ==
The first track "Bon Voyage" starts with the sounds of sea waves, and continues as orchestral electronica. It fades into "Sirens’ Whispering", which feature beat sequence with melody and choir. "Dreams of Surf" is based around acoustic piano. "Spanish Harbour" also features beat and melody as well Spanish guitar. "Islands of the Orient" is a blend of Tangerine Dream-like sequences, chinoiserie-jazzy melody. "Fields of Coral" is the most ambient track on the album. "Aquatic Dance" is built on a synth-bass ostinato and synth-vocals. "Memories of Blue" recalls the "Memories of Green" from See You Later. "Song of the Seas" is mellow sequencer-based track, which fades out to the surf sounds that began the album. The album includes effects which sound like whales, ships horns, porpoises, seagulls and even chimes.

The album showcase melodic orchestration, and by sound is more similar to the New-age music rather than his experimental albums.

== Reception ==
Professional ratings
Review scores
Source	Rating
Allmusic	1.5/5 stars

John Diliberto of Billboard noted that it's different from the typical Vangelis electronic orchestral albums, and that he "gets his sea legs on the odd" with the sampled choral "Sirens", hypnotic "Islands Of The Orient", and ambient grooves of "Spanish Harbour".

Jason Ankeny of Allmusic in one sentence short review with score of 1.5/5 stars, described it as "quiet, meditative work evocative of the sea".

== Track listing ==
1. "Bon Voyage" - 2:33
2. "Sirens' Whispering" - 7:59
3. "Dreams of Surf" - 2:43
4. "Spanish Harbour" - 6:42
5. "Islands of the Orient" - 7:24
6. "Fields of Coral" - 7:44
7. "Aquatic Dance" - 3:44
8. "Memories of Blue" - 5:40
9. "Song of the Seas" - 6:12

== Charts ==
Chart (1996)	Peak
Austria	22
France	29
Germany	87
Hungary	6
Netherlands	98
Sweden	60
Switzerland	37
Billboard New Age Albums	5

== Credits ==
- Composer, Arranger, Producer, Performer – Vangelis
- Assistant Producer – Frederick Rousseau
- Recorder, Mixer – Philippe Colonna
- Sleeve – Alwyn Clayden, Vangelis
