= Alexander (soundtrack) =

Soundtrack album by Vangelis
- Released: 2004
- Recorded: 2003–2004
- Genre: Electronic, classical
- Length: 56:23
- Label: Sony Classical
- Producer: Vangelis

Vangelis chronology
Odyssey: The Definitive Collection (2003)	Alexander (2004)	Blade Runner Trilogy, 25th Anniversary (2007)

Alexander is the original film score of the film Alexander (2004), scored by Greek electronic composer Vangelis. It received the Public Choice Award at the 2005 World Soundtrack Academy.

== Overview ==
The film, directed by Oliver Stone, portrays the life of Alexander the Great in an epic style that is also reflected in the score. Alexander was a king (basileus) of the ancient Greek kingdom of Macedon who expanded the Hellenic civilisation with his conquests on the 4th Century BC; Vangelis, himself a Greek, was already famous for his scores to Chariots of Fire, Blade Runner and Conquest of Paradise. He was directly approached by Stone.

"I tried to remember how it was to live at the time, to be there. At the same time, I must speak the music language which is understandable today, because we're addressing thousands, millions in the audience." - Vangelis in documentary Vangelis Scores Alexander

"You could say that I composed it from memory, which is the most important thing in all of us... when you close your eyes, and make yourself available, you can really remember, and imagine certain things. And all of those ethnic, musical flavors will come to you. It's a universal music language." - Vangelis on ethnic music from Alexander's time

== Release ==
The CD was released in each market with one of three different covers. In some markets, a bonus track (not used in the film) was included, titled "Bizarre Bazar".

== Charts ==
At the Billboard New Age Albums chart peaked at #5 position. In Portugal reached #28, Belgium #96, and France #97.

== Composition ==
Vangelis began composing, arranging, and producing the music on his synthesiser in September 2003, and took almost a year to score due to re-editing of the film. He recalls "with Alexander I started working immediately, because Oliver needed music for his shooting. So some of the music, for the dances, for instance, I composed before the scenes were shot, working with the choreographer and so forth". He gave it to Nic Raine, who orchestrated it and conducted the result, with violinists Vanessa-Mae and Dominique Lemonnier, harpist Maria Bîldea, the Epris Polyphonic Ensemble, tenor Konstantinos Paliatsaras, singer Irina Valentinovna Karpouchina, with around 200 players in the orchestra. According to Vangelis, 40% of the album is live while 60% synth.

The soundtrack features a combination of synthesisers, acoustic instruments and percussion with the choral lines, such as "Titans" and "Drums of Gaugamela". The "Eternal Alexander" and "Tender Memories" are more reflective tracks with an exotic oriental flavour, beginning with a folk tune, and feature a chorus, symphony orchestra and guitar. "Gardens of Delight" and "Roxane’s Dance" for example feature violin, harp and percussion.

Vangelis recorded double amount of music than was released on CD, however, not all film music was included or had the same editing like in the album, or was later released. The one track that wasn't heard in the movie at all, "One Morning at Pella", showed up in the "Final Cut" version of the movie.

== Reception ==
Professional ratings
Review scores
Source	Rating
Allmusic	2.5/5 stars
Film Score Monthly	1/5 stars
Filmtracks.com	5/5 stars
Soundtrack.Net	4/5 stars
Sputnikmusic	3/5 stars

The soundtrack has received mixed reviews. James Christopher Monger of Allmusic observed that "what begins as a Blade Runner-esque wash of atmospheric, keyboard-driven subtlety quickly deteriorates into a thick wall of stock heroic motifs, swelling brass, and thunderous percussion", and gave the soundtrack two-and-half stars out of five. David Coscina of Film Score Monthly considered the soundtrack disappointing due to lack of full and expansive harmonies; "Titans", "the main theme from the film and the main harmonic body of this piece is a simple IV-I progression with little to no deviation in its melodic content from the basic triadic chords", concluding "if there were some interesting textures that compensate for this shortcoming, then I could find some merit in his music. But the antiquated synthesizer sounds only make the listening experience all the worse", and scored it one star out of five. Christian Clemmensen of Filmtracks.com praised the soundtrack for "a continuation of Vangelis' trend towards seeking the perfect harmony between synthetic and orchestral elements", "can be divided into two sections: that in which Vangelis unleashes the ensembles and his electronics in a massive bombardment of rhythm and theme, and those in which he attempts to provide realistic source-like underscore for the erotic and/or Eastern sequences", concluding "on its attempts to insert a synthetic element into music for this general historical period, Alexander succeeds better than Zimmer's Gladiator ever did", scoring it five stars out of five. Messrob Torikian of Soundtrack.Net gave the album 4/5 score, concluding "strong themes, haunting melodies, and the ever present feeling of a vast army always on the march make the album immensely enjoyable".

Jennifer Ravensdale of Sputnikmusic in review summary concluded "always exemplifying the moment, yet constantly struggling to create an identity for itself", and scored it 3/5. Peter Simons of Movie Music UK concluded that "a few good tracks save the album from being a complete waste, but they hardly outweigh the simplicity of the composition and the annoyance of the endlessly repeated percussion", and scored it 2/5. James Southall of Movie Wave rated the album 3/5, saying "Vangelis pulls out every imaginable cliché, but somehow the album features a not inconsiderable amount of highly-entertaining music".

Adrian Edwards of Gramophone noted that "Eternal Alexander" and "Tender Memories" could become the "most frequently aired themes", concluding that "a number of tracks segue from one to another, carrying the mood through and avoiding the fragmentary nature of soundtrack listening. A huge array of credits testify to a job well done".

== Track listing ==
All songs composed and arranged by Vangelis.

1. "Introduction" – 1:32
2. "Young Alexander" – 1:36
3. "Titans" – 3:59
4. "The Drums of Gaugamela" – 5:20
5. "One Morning at Pella" – 2:11
6. "Roxane's Dance" – 3:25
7. "Eastern Path" – 2:58
8. "Gardens of Delight" – 5:24
9. "Roxane's Veil" – 4:40
10. "Bagoas' Dance" – 2:29
11. "The Charge" – 1:41
12. "Preparation" – 1:42
13. "Across the Mountains" – 4:12
14. "Chant" – 1:38
15. "Immortality" – 3:18
16. "Dream of Babylon" – 2:41
17. "Eternal Alexander" – 4:37
18. "Tender Memories" – 2:59

== Certifications ==
Region	Certification	Certified units/sales
Hungary (MAHASZ)	Platinum	20,000^{^}
^{^} Shipments figures based on certification alone.
