= Mythodea =

Album by Vangelis

Mythodea — Music for the NASA Mission: 2001 Mars Odyssey is a choral symphony by Greek electronic composer and artist Vangelis. It premiered as a single concert in Athens, Greece, in 1993 but a recording was only released in 2001 by Vangelis' then new record label Sony Classical, which also set up the NASA connection and promoted a new concert, this time with a worldwide audience.

For the 2001 version of Mythodea, Vangelis expanded and reorchestrated the original composition. It was first recorded and then played live on-stage by: Vangelis on synthesizers and keyboards, the London Metropolitan Orchestra augmented by two harpists, sopranos Kathleen Battle and Jessye Norman, the chorus of the Greek National Opera, and, for the concert only, the Seistron and Typana percussion ensembles. The concert was held in Athens, Greece on June 28, 2001, but the record was officially released only on October 23, 2001, to coincide with the 2001 Mars Odyssey spacecraft entering the orbit of planet Mars. The CD, and later the DVD, achieved a number of sales accolades around the world. In 2019 Vangelis released an album called "Nocturne The Piano Album" It featured an edited piano version of Movement 9 clocking in at 3:48.

== First concert: 1993 ==
The world premiere of Mythodia (original spelling) took place on July 13, 1993, as a public performance at the Herodes Atticus Theater, in Athens, Greece, for charity purposes. On stage were: Vangelis, who provided the full musical score accompanied by two harpists; mezzo-soprano Markella Hatziano, soprano Lucienne Deval, and the chorus and percussion of the Greek National Opera, conducted by Yvan Cassar.

Mythodia was then a piece in seven movements. Vangelis not only composed the music, he also wrote the lyrics in Ancient Greek. In a 2001 interview with KLEMblad magazine, Vangelis stated,

"This piece was composed in an hour. Yes, it took me an hour. […] I'm not using the technology in the conventional way. I'm not using computers."

For the encore, Vangelis played a selection of his repertoire, including "La Petite Fille de la Mer" (from the album L'Apocalypse des Animaux), "Chariots of Fire", "Pulstar" (from the album Albedo 0.39), three tracks from the soundtrack of the film Conquest of Paradise ("Hispañola", "City of Isabel" and "Conquest of Paradise"), and finished with a performance of the Greek national anthem.

== Second concert: 2001 ==
Mythodea would remain unheard in public for the next eight years, but Vangelis kept a recording of the 1993 concert for himself. Around the year 2000, Peter Gelb was the head of Sony Classical and was steering the record company in the direction of crossover music rather than mainstream classical repertoire. He had just signed with Vangelis and was in the process of selecting their first release together. Gelb was listening to some tapes that Vangelis had sent to him when he came upon Mythodea. He described the event in an interview: "When I first heard Mythodea I was in ecstasy with its rhythm and power themes, and with no further hesitation I suggested it was recorded immediately."

With the approval of Vangelis to record Mythodea with a full orchestra as Gelb had suggested, Sony Classical developed a marketing plan of Mythodea that with the help of Vangelis' friend and colleague, Dr. Scott Bolton, grew to include a promotional tie-in with NASA, a dedicated website, an audio CD and a live concert that involved the Greek Government and was broadcast on TV and published on video. The deal with NASA made Mythodea the official music of the mission involving the spacecraft 2001 Mars Odyssey. This mission took the spacecraft to the orbit of Mars on October 23, 2001, and the audio CD of Mythodea was scheduled to be officially released on the same day. Vangelis described the connection he felt between the music and the mission on the 2001 Mars Odyssey official website:

I made up the name Mythodea from the words myth and ode. And I felt in it a kind of shared or common path with NASA's current exploration of the planet [Mars]. Whatever we use as a key — music, mythology, science, mathematics, astronomy — we are all working to decode the mystery of creation, searching for our deepest roots.

The premiere of the new version of Mythodea was held on June 28, 2001. By this date, the album had already been recorded and was finished. The concert was a live performance of the album, with everyone involved in the recording reprising their roles plus additional performers. The setting was the ancient (6th century BC) Temple of Olympian Zeus in Athens, Greece, featured on the album and video covers. Vangelis commented on the selection of location in an interview: "The record company wanted to promote this work and asked me 'where [...]?' and I thought that [...] Greece was really appropriate. And at the same time I had a proposition from the Minister of Culture [...] and this is what happened."

The concert was filmed by a 20-person camera crew. It was broadcast on TV from November 2001, and it was released on DVD in 2002. The budget for the spectacle was set at US$7 million, split in half between the record company, Sony Classical, and the Greek government, which considered the concert a good promotion for Greece abroad and had it included in the Greek Cultural Olympiad leading to the 2004 Summer Olympics. There were some objections raised, mainly by fellow musician Mikis Theodorakis, over the use of both public money and an archaeological site. Vangelis himself, like in 1993, waived payment for his performance.

The spectacle involved 224 musicians on stage: Vangelis, the 75-person London Metropolitan Orchestra augmented by two harpists, soprano artists Kathleen Battle and Jessye Norman, the 123-person chorus of the Greek National Opera, and Greek percussion ensembles Seistron and Typana, that provided 24 timpani. Except for both percussion ensembles, all the other artists had participated in the recording of the album. In the back, a projection screen measuring 180 m (590 ft) in length and 24 m (79 ft) in height showed images of Mars supplied by NASA, combined with elements of ancient Greek mythology.

The number of attending spectators to the ticket-paid event was between 2,000, 2,500, and 3,000 with another 30,000 people watching for free on a giant screen at the nearby Panathinaiko Stadium. The concert lasted just over one hour, after which three encores were played: Chariots of Fire, Conquest of Paradise, and a combination of Movements 9 and 10. Mars itself made a special appearance at the concert as an announcer told the spectators to look for an orange spot shining in the clear sky above the orchestra. The concert was repeated the following day without an audience, to get extra camera angles. Despite not having been announced, around 50 people who showed up at the venue were admitted for free, authorized by Vangelis himself.

Mythodea was expected to be performed by other orchestras, without Vangelis' participation, but as of 2019 that had not happened.

== Album ==
Mythodea — Music for the NASA Mission: 2001 Mars Odyssey

Studio album by Vangelis
- Released: October 23, 2001
- Recorded: 2001
- Genre: Classical
- Length: 66:00
- Label: Sony Classical
- Producer: Vangelis

Vangelis chronology
Reprise 1990–1999 (2000)	Mythodea — Music for the NASA Mission: 2001 Mars Odyssey (2001)	Odyssey: The Definitive Collection (2003)

Professional ratings
Review scores
Source	Rating
Allmusic	2.5/5 stars
Film Score Monthly	3.5/5 stars
Filmtracks.com	3/5 stars
Sputnikmusic	5/5 stars

The album was recorded at the Athens Concert Hall (Athens Μέγαρο Μουσικής - Megaro Moussikis), chosen for its excellent acoustics. For the recording, Vangelis expanded the original composition of 1993 by adding two movements, extending two more and inserting some new cues throughout. The chorus parts were also touched upon, with lyrics and melodic changes.

Except for Vangelis, none of the performers of the 1993 concert reprised their roles. Instead, Vangelis was accompanied by the London Metropolitan Orchestra augmented with two harpists, sopranos Kathleen Battle and Jessye Norman (both Sony Classical artists as well), and the Greek National Opera Choir and percussion ensemble. Vangelis asked musician Blake Neely to make the instrument transcriptions and conduct the orchestra as well.

Although the album was finished by the date of the concert in June 2001, its release was held back until October 23, 2001, to coincide with the entry of the 2001 Mars Odyssey spacecraft in the orbit of Mars. A promotional CD-audio was nevertheless given to the press at the date of the concert and a CD-audio in a blue velvet box was given to guests of a private dinner that took place after the concert. In 2004, two of these boxes were auctioned off online for charity purposes, fetching a total of US $2,435.

Vangelis noted that "it's really the music that manages to speak to all. In Mythodea, everyone can find something to identify with, because it's in this shared language".

=== Track listing ===
1. "Introduction" – 2:43
2. "Movement 1" – 5:41
3. "Movement 2" – 5:39
4. "Movement 3" – 5:51
5. "Movement 4" – 13:42
6. "Movement 5" – 6:35
7. "Movement 6" – 6:27
8. "Movement 7" – 4:58
9. "Movement 8" – 3:07
10. "Movement 9" – 5:00
11. "Movement 10" – 3:03

Two CD-singles were also released, both featuring a track called "Mythodea Special Edit" (3:57) which combined parts of "Movement 9" and "Movement 1", plus either "Movement 1" or "Movement 7". They were not widely available, so their original purpose may have been purely promotional, as were specifically a number of other CD-single releases.

There were variations on the track listing: some releases of the album carried alternative titles "Movement 1" through "Movement 11", and "Mythodea Special Edit" was sometimes included either as a bonus or as a hidden track.

The audio CD is CD-Text-enhanced, with the following header appearing on compatible players: Mythodea - Music for the NASA Mission: 2001 Mars Odyssey - Kathleen Battle, Jessye Norman, Vangelis. Text for tracks appears like this one for track 4: Movement 3 / Vangelis - London Metropolitan Orchestra - Athens Opera Choir - K.Battle - J.Norman.

=== Sales and awards ===
The album reached #1 in the sales charts of Greece, where it attained platinum certification and was nominated for the 2002 "Arion" Greek music awards, in the category "Best instrumental music". In Portugal, the album reached #2 in the charts and attained silver certification for over 10,000 sales. The album reached #39 in Italy, #46 in Germany and #75 in Switzerland. At the Billboard Classical Albums chart peaked at #12 position, charting 22 weeks, while #4 position on Top Classical Albums chart.

=== Other appearances ===
A remixed version of "Movement 1" is included in the Vangelis compilation Odyssey: The Definitive Collection (2003). The opening march starts with less sound effects, instruments join in one by one more clearly, and an initial spoken countdown is absent. The same "Movement 1" was used as the title theme of reality TV series Der Maulwurf (lit. The Mole), which was broadcast by German station Pro7 in 2001. It was also used in the soundtracks of the trailers for the Hollywood films X-Men (2000) and The Scorpion King (2002). Finally, "Movement 9" is included in the compilation album Classic Kathleen Battle /A Portrait.

== Video ==
A one-hour condensed edit of the concert was made available for broadcast by TV stations and later released on video, cutting the intervals and leaving just the first encore, for a total running time of 76 minutes. More significantly, the live playing and singing were replaced by the album version mixed with live applause, except the encore which retained the original full-live recording. The synchronization of the live performance with the album recording was achieved with a click track being played to the performers.

The DVD-Video and VHS were released on February 17, 2002. The DVD featured PCM stereo and 5.1 Dolby Digital sound, 16:9 non-anamorphic image, and had as extras: artist biographies, "Making of Mythodea", music video, an introduction by NASA, and written notes by Vangelis. The DVD-video reached gold status in Portugal, for over 14,000 sales.

== Personnel ==
=== 1993 ===
Music composed, arranged and produced by Vangelis

Concert conceived, designed and directed by Vangelis

- Vangelis: synthesisers, keyboards
- Markella Hatziano, mezzo-soprano
- Lucienne Deval, soprano
- Choir and percussion of the Greek National Opera, Yvan Cassar: conductor

=== 2001 ===
Album composed, arranged and produced by Vangelis

Concert conceived, designed and directed by Vangelis

- Vangelis: synthesisers, keyboards
- Kathleen Battle, Jessye Norman: sopranos
- London Metropolitan Orchestra, Blake Neely: conductor
- Greek National Opera Choir, Fani Palamidi: conductor
- Greek National Opera percussion ensemble (album only)
- Seistron, Typana: percussion ensembles (concert only)
- Frederick Rousseau: sound engineer and coordinator
