= Chariots of Fire (album) =

Film score by Vangelis
- Released: March 1981 (UK); October 1981 (US)
- Recorded: 1980
- Studios: Nemo Studios, London
- Genre: Film score
- Length: 42:03
- Label: Polydor
- Producer: Vangelis

Vangelis chronology
See You Later (1980)	Chariots of Fire (1981)	Antarctica (1983)

Singles from Chariots of Fire
- 1. "Chariots of Fire" Released: April 1981

Professional ratings
Review scores
Source	Rating
Allmusic	4/5 stars
Filmtracks	2/5 stars

Chariots of Fire is a 1981 musical score by Greek electronic composer Vangelis (credited as Vangelis Papathanassiou) for the British film Chariots of Fire, which won four Academy Awards including Best Picture and Original Music Score.

The album topped the Billboard 200 for 4 weeks. It reached #2 in Canada, #5 in the UK, #5 in Australia, and #6 in New Zealand.

The opening theme of the film, called "Titles" on the album track listing but widely known as "Chariots of Fire", was released as a single; on the Billboard Hot 100 it reached #1 and stayed there for one week.

The film score combines styles from across the musical spectrum including prog-rock, symphonic classical music and new age.

== A new style ==
The film's director, Hugh Hudson, chose Vangelis to compose the film's music, after becoming impressed with his albums Opera Sauvage and China and having worked with Vangelis on commercials in Paris during the 1970s. A Yamaha CS-80 synthesizer was used on the recording. Vangelis played all the instruments, including synthesizers, acoustic piano, drums and percussion, and recorded the score in his Nemo studio in London, which he had set up in 1975. The music that he came up with, mostly electronic for a period film, initiated a new style in film scoring. The use of synthesizers in film scores beyond mere textures, and their convenience in allowing directors, producers, and studios to hear preliminary versions of full scores found its roots in Chariots of Fire.

"He [Vangelis] tells us about the way he set about producing the music for Chariots of Fire. About the low budget it really had. About the way in which he endlessly exchanged thoughts with the author about the story. Only when the movie was completely finished did he actually start working on the music for it. Saw it only three times for that purpose and then started work." — Vangelis interview to Music Maker magazine, September 1982

"I didn't want to do period music. I tried to compose a score which was contemporary and still compatible with the time of the film. But I also didn't want to go for a completely electronic sound." — Vangelis interview in American Film magazine, September 1982

The score album was almost all re-recorded, and sounds different from the music heard on film, with often richer arrangements, particularly in the "Titles" track. The second part of the album is a one-track suite including music from and inspired by the score. Some original themes from the film did not make it to the album.

"A record is something other than a film. There have to be changes - not least of all for artistic reasons." — Vangelis interview to Neumusik magazine, issue 5, August 1981

Although Vangelis had already done a number of film scores, including those for animal documentaries by Frédéric Rossif, Chariots of Fire was his first major film score, and it immediately gave him his big breakthrough as a composer, as "Titles" was an international hit and changed the whole course of his career.

"It occurs very rarely that a composer thinks of his most successful work as his best. I am no exception to that rule. I think of my soundtrack for ... Mutiny on the Bounty as endlessly more interesting than Chariots of Fire." — Vangelis interview to De Telegraaf newspaper, June 15, 1991

== Additional information ==
In addition to Vangelis' original music, the album includes an arrangement of "Jerusalem", sung by the Ambrosian Singers, as performed at the 1978 funeral of Harold Abrahams, the event which bookends the film and inspired its title. This famous choral work is a 1916 setting by Sir Hubert Parry of William Blake's poem.

Vangelis dedicated the score to his father Ulysses Papathanassiou who had been a sprinter.

Despite Vangelis public performances being rare, he has played "Chariots of Fire" live in Los Angeles, U.S. (November 7, 1986), Rome, Italy (July 17, 1989, as encore), Rotterdam, Netherlands (June 18, 1991), and Athens, Greece (Mythodea concerts of July 13, 1993 and June 28, 2001, as encore, and August 1, 1997)

In 2000, and again in 2006, the album was relaunched on CD, on both occasions remastered by Vangelis.

Tracks from the album have been included in several official Vangelis compilations, namely Themes (1989), Best Of Vangelis (1992), Portraits {So Long Ago, So Clear} (1996), and Odyssey - The Definitive Collection (2003).

Of the pieces of Vangelis's music that did not end up on the film's soundtrack album is the background music to the race Eric Liddell runs in the Scottish highlands. The title of this piece is "Hymne", and it is a new arrangement for the film from Vangelis' 1979 album, Opéra sauvage. The original version is also included on Vangelis's compilation albums Themes, Portraits, and Odyssey: The Definitive Collection.

Director Hugh Hudson's original choice for the famous slow-motion running sequences on the beach was the track "L'Enfant" from Opéra sauvage. Vangelis had to persuade Hudson to let him create something original for the scene, using the same tempo as "L'Enfant." The result was the "Chariots of Fire" title track, "Titles".

== Court case ==
In 1985 Greek composer Stavros Logaridis sued Vangelis for plagiarism (EMI vs Warner Brothers), alleging the title track had plagiarised Logaridis' song "City of Violets" (1977), which does feature similar instrumentation and chord progressions. Vangelis demonstrated his first-take improvisational composition style live on his synthesizers in court and was acquitted of the complaint. The case reached the London High Courts in 1987 and was referred to as a test case numerous times in the following years in matters relating, but not limited, to music sampling and copyright infringement.

== Uses in other media ==
The "Titles" track of Chariots of Fire has been used in innumerable parodies in films and television shows, especially in slow-motion sequences. It is used in the Olympic-themed video game Track & Field.

The piece has also been used in numerous venues as inspirational music for athletes. At the opening ceremony of the 2012 Summer Olympics, the piece was used in a parody London Symphony Orchestra performance featuring Rowan Atkinson, in character as Mr. Bean. The piece was also played during every victory ceremony at the 2012 Summer Olympics in London.

It has been used during celebratory occasions for organizations. For one notable example, it was played when Apple Inc.'s chairman Steve Jobs introduced the first Macintosh on January 24, 1984, at a technology demonstration event.

== Track listing ==
The album was released in 1981 on LP, compact cassette and on 8-track cartridge in the U.S. The version on CD was released in 1984 in Germany. The track list below corresponds to LP and cassette variants.

All tracks written by Vangelis Papathanassiou, except where noted.

Side one

1. "Chariots of Fire" ("Titles") – 3:33
2. "Five Circles" – 5:20
3. "Abraham's Theme" – 3:20
4. "Eric's Theme" – 4:18
5. "100 Metres" – 2:04
6. "Jerusalem" – 2:47 (Hubert Parry; arranged by Harry Rabinowitz)

Side two

1. "Chariots of Fire" – 20:41

== Personnel ==
- Vangelis — all instruments
- Ambrosian Singers — choir (track 6)
- John McCarthy — choir director (track 6)
- Raphael Preston — engineer
- Raine Shine — engineer
- John Walker — engineer

== Charts ==
The album reached number-one in the sales charts of various countries, including four weeks at number-one in the United States. In total, the album stayed 97 weeks in the Billboard 200, selling three million copies in the first year alone, becoming the best-selling instrumental film score until the release of Titanic in 1997. The album reached number five in the UK Albums Chart and stayed in the listing for 107 weeks.

=== Weekly charts ===
Chart (1981–82)	Peak position
Australia (Kent Music Report)	5
Austrian Albums (Ö3 Austria)	11
Canada (RPM) (2wks@2)	2
Dutch Albums (Album Top 100)	9
German Albums (Offizielle Top 100)	39
New Zealand Albums (RMNZ)	6
UK Albums Chart (Official Charts Company)	5
US Billboard 200	1

=== Year-end charts ===
Chart (1982)	Position
Canada (RPM) Top 100 Albums 82	24
New Zealand Albums (RMNZ)	21
US Billboard 200	9

== Certifications ==
Region	Certification	Certified units/sales
Australia (ARIA)	2× Platinum	100,000^{^}
Austria (IFPI Austria)	Gold	25,000^{*}
Canada (Music Canada)	3× Platinum	300,000^{^}
France (SNEP)	Gold	100,000^{*}
Hong Kong (IFPI Hong Kong)	Gold	10,000^{*}
Spain (Promusicae)	Platinum	100,000^{^}
United Kingdom (BPI)	Platinum	300,000^{^}
United States (RIAA)	Platinum	1,000,000^{^}
Summaries
Worldwide	—	3,000,000
^{*} Sales figures based on certification alone.^{^} Shipments figures based on certification alone.
