= HMS Endurance =

Two Royal Navy ships have been called HMS Endurance after Sir Ernest Shackleton's Endurance, the ship crushed in the ice of the Weddell Sea during his 1914–1915 Antarctic expedition. The ships' motto, Fortitudine Vincimus (By Endurance We Conquer), was Shackleton's family motto.

- HMS Endurance (1967), pennant number A171, served as the British Antarctic ice patrol vessel from 1967 to 1991. She was built in Denmark in 1956 as Anita Dan and purchased by the Royal Navy in 1967.
- HMS Endurance (A171), was a class 1A1 icebreaker which was in service between 1991 and 2008 as the replacement for the first HMS Endurance. She was built in Norway in 1990 as Polar Circle and leased by the Royal Navy in 1991, then purchased and renamed in 1992. She was scrapped in Turkey in 2016.

== Battle honours ==
Ships named Endurance have earned the following battle honours:

- Falkland Islands, 1982
