= Foros Timis Ston Greco =

Studio album by Vangelis
- Released: 1995
- Recorded: 1995
- Genre: Classical music
- Length: 58:51
- Label: Warner Music Group
- Producer: Vangelis

Vangelis chronology
Blade Runner (1994)	Foros Timis Ston Greco (1995)	Voices (1995)

Foros Timis Ston Greco (Φόρος Τιμής Στον Γκρέκο, lit. A Tribute to El Greco) is a classical album by Greek electronic composer and artist Vangelis (as Vangelis Papathanassiou/Βαγγέλης Παπαθανασίου). The title is an allusion to the man who inspired the composition, Dominikos Theotokópoulos (Δομήνικος Θεοτοκόπουλος, 1541–1614), the Cretan-born painter and sculptor better known as El Greco.

The album was published in 1995 as a limited edition of 3,000 CD-audios and sold exclusively at the National Art Gallery and Alexandros Soutzos Museum in Athens, Greece, which was raising funds to buy El Greco's painting "St. Peter". The luxurious packaging, in a dark-blue velvet box, included a 128-page coffee table book, about El Greco's paintings, dedicated to Vangelis, and a digipack containing the CD. Each CD carried Vangelis' personal signature and a unique serial number. For such a special edition, the price was 30,000 drachmas (US $127), or, adjusted for Greek inflation as of 2006, 45,000 drachmas (€132/$176).

Vangelis composed and arranged the album, and performed all the instruments, accompanied by a choir conducted by Ivan Cassar. The music is in a Byzantine style yet sounding contemporary due to his use of synthesisers. Soprano Montserrat Caballé and tenor Konstantinos Paliatsaras make guest appearances on one movement each.

The image on the album is a section of Madonna and Child with St. Martina and St. Agnes by El Greco

A regular edition of the album was released worldwide in 1998, with three new tracks and a new title: El Greco.

== Track listing ==
1. Μέρος/Movement I – 10:08
2. Μέρος/Movement II – 5:24
3. Μέρος/Movement III – 6:25
4. Μέρος/Movement IV – 9:49
5. Μέρος/Movement V – 8:16
6. Μέρος/Movement VI – 11:44
7. Μέρος/Movement VII – 7:02

Movements III and V were included in Vangelis' compilation Reprise 1990-1999 (2000).
