= Yamaha CS-80 =

Synthesizer made by Yamaha in 1977

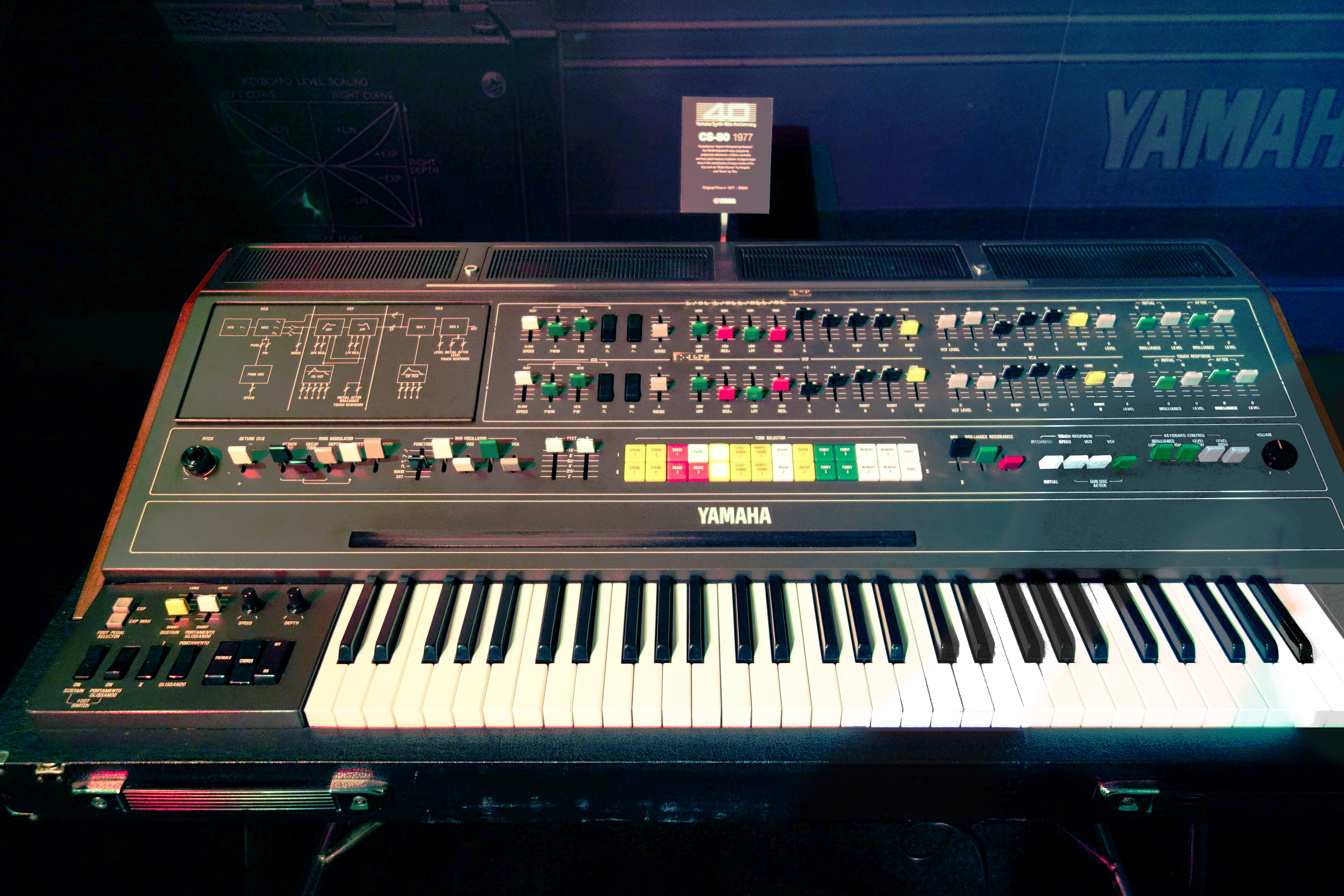
- Manufacturer: Yamaha
- Dates: 1977–1980
- Price: US$6900; GB£4950; JP¥1,280,000

Technical specifications
- Polyphony: 8 voices, dual layers
- Timbrality: Multitimbral
- Oscillator: 2 per voice
- LFO: 1 multi-waveform
- Synthesis type: Analog subtractive
- Filter: 2 High-pass; 2 Low-pass
- Attenuator: ADSR
- Aftertouch expression: Yes, polyphonic
- Velocity expression: Yes
- Storage memory: 22 preset 4 user
- Effects: chorus, tremolo

Input/output
- Keyboard: 61-note with velocity and polyphonic aftertouch (on a per note rather than per patch basis)
- Left-hand control: Ribbon Controller

The Yamaha CS-80 is an analog synthesizer introduced by Yamaha Corporation in 1977. It supports true 8-voice polyphony, with two independent synthesizer layers per voice each with its own set of front panel controls, in addition to a number of hardwired preset voice settings and four parameter settings stores based on banks of subminiature potentiometers (rather than the digital programmable presets featured on the Prophet-5 introduced soon after).

It has exceptionally complete performer expression features, such as a layered keyboard that was both velocity-sensitive (like a piano's) and pressure-sensitive ("after-touch"), but unlike most modern keyboards the aftertouch could be applied to individual voices rather than in common, and a ribbon controller allowing for polyphonic pitch-bends and glissandos.

Production of the instrument ceased in 1980. Vying with the Sequential Circuits Prophet-5 and Oberheim OB-X polysynths for the title, the CS-80 is often described as the pre-eminent polyphonic analog synthesizer, and, together with the monophonic Moog modular synthesizer, commands amongst the highest resale price of any synthesizer.

== Software and hardware emulations ==
There are plug-in instrument software emulations of the CS-80 for usage in digital audio workstation, music sequencer and other software which supports the plug-in formats. This includes the following plugins with the year they were first released:

- Arturia CS-80 V (2003)
- Cherry Audio GX-80 (2022)
  - CS-80 emulation combined with its predecessor the GX-1.
- memorymoon ME80 (2009)
- Softube Model 77 (2024)
- Xils-Lab The Eighty (2025)

There are no known hardware clones of the entire CS-80. At the 2014 NAMM Show, Studio Electronics premiered the Boomstar SE80 synthesizer which includes a cloned filter section of the CS-80. Black Corporation's Deckard's Dream (2017) and upcoming Deckard's Dream MK2 (autumn 2024) are rackmount synthesizer with CS-80 inspired architectures and features which support polyphonic aftertouch using compatible third party external keyboards.

In 2015, Yamaha introduced the Reface CS, a 37 key mini synth, based on the CS-80.

== Vangelis ==
The Greek composer Vangelis used the Yamaha CS-80 extensively. He described it as "the most important synthesizer in my career — and for me the best analogue synthesizer design there has ever been ... It needs a lot of practice if you want to be able to play it properly, but that's because it's the only synthesizer I could describe as being a real instrument, mainly because of the keyboard — the way it's built and what you can do with it."

Vangelis first used the CS-80 on his 1977 album, Spiral, and would continue to use it for the rest of his life. It was his main synthesizer during the late 1970s and much of the 1980s, featuring prominently on China, Opera Sauvage, the soundtracks for Chariots of Fire and Blade Runner, and the first three Jon & Vangelis albums.

== See also ==
- Yamaha GX-1, a polyphonic synthesizer released in 1973
- CS-15
- CS-60

== Bibliography ==
- Jenkins, Mark (19 October 2009). Analog Synthesizers: Understanding, Performing, Buying. Taylor & Francis (published 2009). ISBN 978-1-136-12277-4.
- "Yamaha CS-80 - Polysynth (Retro)". Reviews : Keyboard. Sound On Sound. No. July 1995. Archived from the original on 2015-06-07.
- Reid, Gordon (18 May 2013). "The Yamaha CS-80". Gordon Reid's Vintage Synthesis (gordonreid.co.uk). Archived from the original on 17 September 2014.
- "Yamaha CS-80". Music Technology. Vol. 4, no. 10. September 1990. p. 64. ISSN 0957-6606. OCLC 24835173.
