= Voices (Vangelis album) =

Studio album by Vangelis
- Released: 23 October 1995
- Recorded: 1995
- Genre: Electronica
- Length: 54:25
- Label: East West (Europe) / Atlantic (USA)
- Producer: Vangelis

Vangelis chronology
Foros Timis Ston Greco (1995)	Voices (1995)	Oceanic (1996)

Singles from Voices
- 1. "Voices" Released: 16 October 1995; 2. "Ask the Mountains" Released: 4 March 1996

Professional ratings
Review scores
Source	Rating
Allmusic	3/5 stars

Voices is a studio album by Greek electronic composer Vangelis, released in 1995.

== Overview ==
Caroline Lavelle sings and plays cello on the song "Come To Me", Paul Young sings on "Losing Sleep", while Stina Nordenstam sings on "Ask the Mountains".

== Release ==
The album was released on 23 October 1995 in Europe and on 19 February 1996 in the United Kingdom and reached #58 position in the UK Albums Chart on 2 March 1996. The single "Ask The Mountains" was co-released with Stina Nordenstam, and reached #77 position in the UK Singles Chart on 16 March 1996.

== Track listing ==
1. "Voices" (Vangelis) – 7:00
2. "Echoes" (Vangelis) – 8:20
3. "Come To Me" (Vangelis, Lavelle) – 4:40
4. "P.S." (Vangelis) – 2:05
5. "Ask The Mountains" (Vangelis, Nordenstam) – 7:55
6. "Prelude" (Vangelis) – 4:24
7. "Losing Sleep (Still, My Heart)" (Vangelis, Young) – 6:41
8. "Messages" (Vangelis) – 7:30
9. "Dream In An Open Place" (Vangelis) – 5:50
- The music was used in the soundtrack for the 1998 documentary Deep Sea, Deep Secrets co-produced by The Learning Channel and Discovery Channel, together with music from Vangelis next album, Oceanic.
- The track "Ask the Mountains" was used as the background music for the TV commercial by Indesit for the Hotpoint-Ariston Aqualtis washing machine in 2006, which won the Lion Award at the Cannes Lions International Festival of Creativity.

== Credits ==
- Vangelis – composer, performer
- Caroline Lavelle – vocals, cello, lyrics
- Stina Nordenstam – vocals, lyrics
- Paul Young – vocals, lyrics
- Athens Opera Company – vocals on "Voices"

Production

- Vangelis — producer, arranger
- Philippe Colonna — engineer, mixer
- Frederick Rousseau — assistant producer
- Stylorouge — design
- Jim Freedman — cover photography
- Alex Misiewicz — underwater photography

== Charts ==
Chart (1995–1996)	Peak
Austria	6
Belgium	16
Germany	24
Netherlands	36
Norway	25
Sweden	50
Switzerland	31
UK	58
Billboard New Age Albums	9

== Certifications ==
Region	Certification	Certified units/sales
Austria (IFPI Austria)	Gold	25,000^{*}
Germany (BVMI)	Gold	250,000^{^}
^{*} Sales figures based on certification alone.^{^} Shipments figures based on certification alone.
