= The City (Vangelis album) =

Studio album by Vangelis
- Released: 19 November 1990
- Recorded: Hotel de la Ville, Rome and Mega Studios, Paris
- Genre: Electronica, new age
- Length: 43:08
- Label: East West (Europe) / Atlantic (USA)
- Producer: Vangelis

Vangelis chronology
Themes (1989)	The City (1990)	1492: Conquest of Paradise (1992)

Professional ratings
Review scores
Source	Rating
Allmusic	4/5 stars

The City is a 1990 album by the Greek artist Vangelis. Reportedly, it was produced entirely in a Rome hotel room, where Vangelis was staying to witness the filming of the Roman Polanski film Bitter Moon (for which he'd been commissioned to write the soundtrack). It can be seen as a concept album, citing concepts from urban life and alluding to the big city atmosphere. The album peaked at #3 on the Billboard New Age Albums chart.

== Track listing ==
All tracks written by Vangelis.

No.	Title	Length
1.	"Dawn"	4:16
2.	"Morning Papers"	3:55
3.	"Nerve Centre"	5:30
4.	"Side Streets"	4:12
5.	"Good to See You"	6:51
6.	"Twilight"	4:57
7.	"Red Lights"	3:55
8.	"Procession"	9:33

== Instruments ==
Vangelis plays all instruments: exclusively synthesisers and drum machines. Spoken-word vocals are contributed by various guest artists (Kathy Hill on "Good to See You"; Mikamo Yuko and Kimura Rieko on "Twilight" and "Red Lights"), with recorded footsteps and vocal narrative at points throughout the album by Roman Polanski and Emmanuelle Seigner.

== Style ==
Vangelis employs a wide range of styles, from jazz (2) and rock (3) to new age (5, 6). Instrument patches are all synthesizer-based, but sound very convincing (trumpet on 1, guitar on 3, cello on 8).

Although The City is the first album after Direct (1988), there is no mention of the "Direct series" as discussed in that album's sleeve notes. It can also not be easily linked with his subsequent work, such as the 1492: Conquest of Paradise soundtrack.
