= Conquest of Paradise (song) =

Single by Vangelis

from the album 1492: Conquest of Paradise
- B-side: "Moxica and the Horse"
- Released: 19 October 1992
- Genre: New age
- Length: 4:47
- Label: East West
- Songwriter: Vangelis
- Producer: Vangelis

Vangelis singles chronology
"Missing" (1989)	"Conquest of Paradise" (1992)	"Twenty Eighth Parallel" (1993)

"Conquest of Paradise" is a song recorded by Greek composer Vangelis. It was the soundtrack from Ridley Scott's 1992 film 1492: Conquest of Paradise and the lead single from the album of the same name. The song achieved success in many territories, including Flanders, Germany, the Netherlands, and Switzerland where it topped the singles chart, but was a relative failure in UK where it only peaked at number 60. The song's popularity had been boosted in Germany by boxer Henry Maske using it as his theme song.

Its chord progression is based on the old European theme La Follia.

== Track listings ==
CD single

1. "Conquest of Paradise" – 4:47
2. "Moxica and the Horse" – 7:12

CD maxi-single

1. "Conquest of Paradise" – 4:47
2. "Moxica and the Horse" – 7:12
3. "Line Open" – 4:43
4. "Landscape" – 1:37
- Includes two songs ("Line Open" and "Landscape"), which were not included in the album.

== Lyrics ==
The lyrics, in Pseudo-Latin, written by choir conductor Guy Protheroe, are repeated throughout the song:

In nòreni per ìpe,
in noreni coràh;
tirà mine per ìto,
ne dominà.

One time this refrain is:

In ròmine tirmèno,
ne ròmine to fa,
imàgine pro mèno,
per imentirà.

== Credits ==
- Choir: The English Chamber Choir
- Composed and arranged by Vangelis
- Choir conductor: Guy Protheroe
- Produced by Frederick Rousseau
- Recorded and mixed by Philippe Colonna, at Epsilon Laboratory, Paris

== Charts ==
=== Weekly charts ===
Chart (1992–1995)	Peak position
Austria (Ö3 Austria Top 40)	2
Belgium (Ultratop 50 Flanders)	1
Belgium (Ultratop 50 Wallonia)	5
Europe (Eurochart Hot 100)	3
France (SNEP)	12
Germany (GfK)	1
Iceland (Íslenski Listinn Topp 40)	40
Netherlands (Dutch Top 40)	1
Netherlands (Single Top 100)	1
Switzerland (Schweizer Hitparade)	1
UK Singles (Official Charts)	60

=== Year-end charts ===
Chart (1995)	Position
Austria (Ö3 Austria Top 40)	4
Belgium (Ultratop 50 Flanders)	2
Belgium (Ultratop 50 Wallonia)	24
Europe (Eurochart Hot 100)	14
Germany (Media Control)	1
Netherlands (Dutch Top 40)	2
Netherlands (Single Top 100)	3
Switzerland (Schweizer Hitparade)	2

=== Decade-end charts ===
Chart (1990–1999)	Rank
Austria (Ö3 Austria Top 40)	29
Belgium (Ultratop 50 Flanders)	35
Netherlands (Dutch Top 40)	15

== Certifications ==
Region	Certification	Certified units/sales
Austria (IFPI Austria)	Gold	25,000^{*}
Germany (BVMI)	3× Platinum	1,700,000
Netherlands (NVPI)	Platinum	75,000^{^}
^{*} Sales figures based on certification alone.^{^} Shipments figures based on certification alone.

== In popular culture ==
=== Covers ===
The song has been covered by many artists, including Blake, Klaus Schulze, Free the Spirit, the Vienna Symphonic Orchestra Project, Kati Kovács, John Williams and the Boston Pops Orchestra (1996), Daylight (1997), Daniel Hůlka (1998), Dana Winner (2002), The Ten Tenors (2004), Rhydian (2009) and Gregorian (2012).

=== At sport events ===
"Conquest of Paradise" is played at home games for the New Zealand Super Rugby team Crusaders, Rugby Premiership team Northampton Saints and Super League teams Widnes Vikings and Wigan Warriors. These days it is the unofficial theme tune for the city of Christchurch where the Crusaders rugby team is based. English football club Sheffield Wednesday also play Conquest of Paradise prior to their theme tune before kick off. "Conquest of Paradise" was also played at the Cricket World Cup (2011) and (2015) just before the national anthems of the two contesting national teams were played at the start of every match. It was also played during the 2010 and 2014 cricket World Twenty20 championships to uphold International Cricket Council's "spirit-of-cricket" concept just before the national anthems of the two playing teams. The Ultra-Trail du Mont-Blanc series uses "Conquest of Paradise" at the start, finish and prize ceremonies of its various ultramarathon races. It is also used by the Engadin Skimarathon to introduce the start of the competitors waves. At least in the years 2010–2013. Usually every minute it is interrupted to announce the time until "go!". German boxer Henry Maske used it as his theme song. At the long-distance sled-dog race Finnmarkslopet in Norway, the song is played every time a dog team crosses the finish line. Mexican luchador Pierroth Jr. used the song as his entrance music while wrestling for the AAA promotion. The theme was played at Laurel Park, MD. during the parade of horses at the 2026 Preakness Stakes.

=== In politics ===
In the 1995 Portuguese legislative election, the Socialist Party, led by António Guterres, adopted the song as their campaign theme. Having spent ten years in the opposition to center-right Prime Minister Aníbal Cavaco Silva, it played a big part in changing the image of the party as it was preparing for a new election. Firstly used in Guterres' national caravan to replace the party's anthem, it was used throughout the campaign to introduce Guterres to the crowd in his rallies.

The song became a symbol of the party and Guterres' governments, being used several times throughout the years in political campaigns.

=== In TV shows and cinema ===
It was used for many years in the Jeux Sans Frontières, using it during the credits. The single "Conquest of Paradise" has also been inserted in the 2007 Chinese television drama series Soldiers Sortie, and is used as the theme song in the Hindi film, Koyla (1997), Kaalapani (1996) and a Tamil film, Sundara Purushan (1996). The song was also used in the trailer for Mission to Mars (2000). It's also part of the soundtrack of The Man from U.N.C.L.E. (2015), by Guy Ritchie.

=== In ice shows ===
"Conquest of Paradise" was used for a collaboration program performed by two-time Olympic figure skating champion Yuzuru Hanyu and three-time Olympic gymnastics champion Kōhei Uchimura, merging the two Olympic sports to a new performing art genre. The program was inspired by the theme of challenge to the unknown. Hanyu's solo skating part was choreographed by Canadian choreographer David Wilson. The program was performed at the ice show Yuzuru Hanyu Notte Stellata, held on 10–12 March 2023, at Sekisui Heim Super Arena in Rifu, Miyagi. It was a commemoration event on the 12th anniversary of the 2011 Tōhoku earthquake and tsunami, also known as the "Great East Japan Earthquake" or "3.11".

=== At graduations ===
The song is also played as the opening song at some primary school, secondary school, high school and university graduation ceremonies in Turkey.

=== In social media ===
It was used by Julian Alvarez to musicalize his publication on Instagram after his victory over England in the 2026 FIFA World Cup.
