= FilmMusic.com =

Website

- Website type: Film, Music, Film score, website
- Owners: Autotelics, LLC
- Website: filmmusic.com
- Commercial: Yes
- Launched: February 1997
- Current status: Active

FilmMusic.com (originally SoundtrackNet) is a website dedicated to film and television music.

== History ==
Created in 1997 by Amélie E. Koran and Dan Goldwasser at Carnegie Mellon University, Soundtrack.Net has grown over the past decade to become one of the leading websites covering the film music industry in Hollywood.

In 1998 the site merged with FilmMusic.com (founded in 1996) to create a large database, which includes the largest publicly accessible trailer music database online today. In November 2005, Time Magazine listed SoundtrackNet as one of the "Top 20 Music Websites of 2005".

As of January 1, 2008, the scoring session news items have all been moved to ScoringSessions.com.

On October 16, 2011, SoundtrackNet was purchased by Box Office Mojo co-founder Sean Saulsbury, and renamed to Soundtrack.Net.

== Journalism ==
On July 22, 2000, SoundtrackNet broke the news about Howard Shore being assigned to score The Lord of the Rings film trilogy. On October 14, 2005, SoundtrackNet revealed that Howard Shore was replaced on Peter Jackson's King Kong by composer James Newton Howard.
