= Frederick Rousseau =

- Born: 1958 (age 67–68); Paris, France
- Genres: New Age
- Occupation: Instrumentalist
- Instrument: Keyboard
- Website: frederickrousseau.com fredrousseau.com

Frederick Rousseau (born 1958 in Paris) is a New Age instrumentalist. His musical research is based on electronic sounds that he mixes with ethnic instruments, classical orchestras, and vocals.

== Career ==
After a classical training in piano, Rousseau tried multiple instruments (including bass guitar, drums, electric guitar, and percussions) and finally chose the keyboards.

After completing his studies in electronics, he was hired by the Defense Nationale in 1978 to work on the final tests of the neutronic head, the detonator for the French atomic bomb. After two years of this work, he quit.

In 1980, he met Francis Mandin, a young electronic music fan, who convinced him to become a partner in Music Land, a music store in Paris and a laboratory for future electronic instruments.

In 1981, after working on the finalization of the first polyphonic sequencer (MDB Polysequencer), he met Jean Michel Jarre, who was looking for a musical programmer capable of manipulating this instrument for his China tour that would be seen by 60,000 people. Rousseau was able to reproduce on stage all the sequences that Jarre had taken months to record without having to use playback tapes. This experience marked a turn in his career. Returning to Paris, he continued to participate in the recording of the live album Concerts en Chine.

Later that year, Rousseau met Greek musician Vangelis, who was recording The Friends of Mr Cairo at Studio Davout in Paris, and became friends with Jean-Philippe Rykiel. The following year, Rousseau was called back to London by Vangelis for the recording of the music score of Ridley Scott's Blade Runner. He was responsible for programming all keyboards except the Yamaha CS-80. This was the start of a complementary work relationship that was to last over twenty years.

Returning to Paris in 1984, he collaborated on Jean-Michel Jarre's Zoolook album, programming the Fairlight CMI sequences and playing other keyboards. The result was not immediately liked by Dreyfus Records.

In 1987, not wanting to be involved in Jarre's Revolutions album, Rousseau created French recording Studio Mega, in association with Thierry Rogen. During the next four years, he recorded with many leading French artists of the time, including Mylène Farmer, Jean-Louis Murat, Louis Bertignac, Indochine, and Kassav.

In 1990, Jean Michel Jarre used Rousseau again to rewrite all the intros and sequences of the music for La Défense Concert. On stage, Rousseau's job was to synchronize the sequences and to reproduce live all the special effects characteristic of Jarre's music. This concert made it into the Guinness World Records as having the largest concert audience (2,500,000 people).

The year after, Vangelis moved to Paris and recorded the album The City at Studio Mega, which took more than six months. Rousseau then followed the Greek composer to Holland for Eureka, the European community project initiated by François Mitterrand on the theme of Industry and Transport. This concert took place on the Rotterdam docks and was transmitted by satellite to many European countries.

In 1992, Vangelis convinced Rousseau to leave Studio Mega in order to create Astron Studio in Neuilly. They consecutively recorded the music scores of La Peste by Luis Puenzo, Bitter Moon by Roman Polanski, and 1492: Conquest of Paradise by Ridley Scott. After Vangelis moved back to Greece, Rousseau traveled back and forth to Athens for the production of the shows Antigone (1993), La Nuit des Poètes (1994), and Tribute to El Greco (1995).

Rousseau released another solo album, MÖ, in 1994, which was inspired by Asian music and would open the way to ethno-lounge music. He continued on his solo career, releasing Spirit in the Woods (1995), dedicated to trees, then Abyss (1996), a concept that Rousseau refers to as "non music," an experience realised with neurologists specialised in musicotherapy. In 1997, he released Woods, an electro-wood fusion with voices from forest people and tribal rhythms.

In 1997, Rousseau rejoined Vangelis in Athens for the opening ceremony of the world championship of athletics.

Meanwhile, Rousseau composed the soundtracks for 40 ethnozoological documentary films and released in 1999 the collection of five albums Terres de Légendes.

Vangelis' project Mythodea initiated in 1993, was finally completed in 2001. Rousseau coordinated the electro-orchestral show starring Jessye Norman and Kathleen Battle and performed by the London Metropolitan Orchestra, directed by Blake Neely. This music was chosen by NASA for the 2001 mission "Mars Odyssey."

In 2002, Rousseau released Travels a musical Travelog, and in 2003, Recall an exclusive release by Nature et Découvertes.

2004 was marked by Oliver Stone's Alexander in which Vangelis composed the soundtrack and Rousseau participated as editor. This project lasted over a year.

In 2005, Rousseau signed with Milan-Universal and came out with a new album, Tears.

Since 2008, Frederick has worked as Head of Industrial Relations for IRCAM, the French music institute.

In March 2017, he released the album Edge of Silence which contains a tribute to Vangelis, MR V.

This was rapidly followed in May by the ambient album I.S.S. (Intimate Sound Scapes), also on the Spinnup label.

== Compositions ==
=== Albums ===
- Music Land (with Jean-Philippe Rykiel) Promo single for the Music instrument shop
- FR2 (with Francis Rimbert) - April Orchestra vol 48
- Earth - April orchestra vol 61
- Overview - Koka Media
- Illustrator series (1990–1992)
- Mö (1994)
- Spirit in the Woods (1995)
- Abyss (1996)
- Woods (1997)
- Terres de Légendes series (1999–2000)
- Travels (2002)
- Recall (2003)
- Tears (2005)
- Edge of Silence (2017)
- I.S.S. (Intimate Sound Scapes) (2017)
- Conversation With Aliens (2025)

=== Compilations ===
- Harmonia (1997)
- World Voices (1998)
- Buddha Bar III - IV - V (2000–2004)
- Private Lounge (2002)
- Asian I & II (2000–2002)

=== Collaborations ===
Jean-Michel Jarre

  - Les Chants Magnetiques (1980)
  - China Concert Tour (1981)
  - Concerts en Chine (live album 1982)
  - Musique pour supermarché / Music for supermarket (One copy only LP 1983)
  - Zoolook (1984)
  - Le Défense concert (1990)

Vangelis

  - Blade Runner (film by Ridley Scott 1983)
  - Friends of Mr Cairo (1984)
  - Themes (1990)
  - Oceanic (1998)
  - La Peste (film by Luis Puenzo 1991)
  - Rotterdam concert (1992)
  - 1492, Conquest of Paradise (film by Ridley Scott 1992)
  - 1492, (album 1992)
  - Opening Show IAFF (1997)
  - Mythodea (Concert with Jessye Norman 2001)
  - Alexander (film by Oliver Stone 2004)
  - Blade Runner Trilogy (album 2007)
  - El Greco (album 2007)
  - Paris May 1968 (album 2008)

Eric Levi

  - Operation Cornet de Beef
  - Les Visiteurs I
  - les Visiteurs II
  - Les Anges Gardien
  - La vengeance d'une blonde
  - Les Filles du Botaniste
