= Blade Runner (soundtrack) =

Soundtrack album by Vangelis

Blade Runner: Original Motion Picture Soundtrack
- 1994 CD version

Film score by Vangelis
- Released: June 6, 1994
- Recorded: December 1981 – April 1982
- Studios: Nemo Studios, London
- Genres: Electronic; new-age; ambient
- Length: 57:39
- Label: East West (Europe) / Atlantic (U.S.)
- Producer: Vangelis

Vangelis chronology
1492: Conquest of Paradise (1992)	Blade Runner: Original Motion Picture Soundtrack (1994)	Foros Timis Ston Greco (1995)

Blade Runner: Original Motion Picture Soundtrack is the soundtrack for Ridley Scott's 1982 science-fiction noir film Blade Runner, composed by Greek electronic musician Vangelis. It has received acclaim as an influential work in the history of electronic music and one of Vangelis's best works. It was nominated in 1983 for a BAFTA and Golden Globe for best original score. The score evokes the film's bleak futurism with an emotive synthesizer-based sound, drawing on the jazz scores of classic film noir as well as Middle Eastern texture and neo-classical elements.

The official release of the soundtrack was delayed for over a decade. The first 1994 release omitted much of the film's score and included compositions not used in the film. A 25th anniversary edition released in 2007 included further unreleased material and a disc of new music inspired by the film. Various bootleg recordings containing more comprehensive versions of the score, as well as superior sound quality to the original 1994 release, have widely circulated.

An orchestral rendition of the soundtrack was released in 1982 by the New American Orchestra, but disowned by both Vangelis and director Scott.

== Recording ==
Vangelis recorded, mixed and produced the score for Blade Runner in his London recording space Nemo Studios in 1982. He crafted the score on an ad-hoc basis by viewing videotapes of scenes from the film in the studio, and then improvising pieces in synchronisation with the images on the screen. He also applied the use of some Foley techniques, using synthesisers to produce diegetic and non-diegetic sounds. The album features vocals from Demis Roussos and saxophone by Dick Morrissey on "Love Theme". The track "Memories of Green" from Vangelis' 1980 album See You Later was also used.

The most prominent synthesiser used in the score was the Yamaha CS-80, which can be prominently heard in the opening scenes. Other synthesisers employed by Vangelis included four Roland instruments: the ProMars, the Jupiter-4, the CR-5000 drum machine, and the VP-330 Vocoder Plus; a Sequential Circuits Prophet-10; a Yamaha GS1 FM synthesizer; and an E-mu Emulator sampler. A Steinway grand piano, a Yamaha CP-80 electric grand and a modified Fender Rhodes were also used. He also utilised a variety of traditional instruments, including gamelan, glockenspiel, gong, snare drum, timpani and tubular bells.

== Releases ==
=== Official Vangelis score ===
==== 1994 release ====
Professional ratings
Review scores
Source	Rating
AllMusic	5/5 stars
Encyclopedia of Popular Music	3/5 stars
Film Score Monthly	4/5 stars
Filmtracks	3/5 stars
The Great Rock Discography	7/10
Music Week	5/5 stars
NME	9/10
Q	4/5 stars
Sputnikmusic	4.5/5 stars

In 1994, an official recording of Vangelis' score was released by East West (Warner Music) in the UK and by Atlantic Records in the US. The album reached the #20 position in the UK album charts. In 2013 it reached #14 on the Billboard Vinyl Albums chart. It has been variously described as "influential and mythical", "incredible and pristine", "evocative", and "the pinnacle of synthesiser soundtracks". AllMusic labeled the score as "bleak and electronically chilling as the film itself" and praised Vangelis for creating "haunting soundscapes with whispered subtexts and sweeping revelations".

This release omits much of the film's original music and cues, and features compositions which were not present in the film. The accompanying booklet featured this explanation by Vangelis:

Most of the music contained in this album originates from recordings I made in London in 1982, whilst working on the score for the film Blade Runner. Finding myself unable to release these recordings at the time; it is with great pleasure that I am able to do so now. Some of the pieces contained will be known to you from the Original Soundtrack of the film, whilst others are appearing here for the first time. Looking back at Ridley Scott's powerful and evocative pictures left me as stimulated as before, and made the recompiling of this music, today, an enjoyable experience. (Vangelis, Athens, April 1994)

While most of the tracks on the album are from the film, a number were composed by Vangelis but were ultimately not used in the film. Other compositions that appear in the film were not included on this release.

Four of the tracks ("Main Titles", "Blush Response", "Wait For Me", "Tears in Rain") feature samples of dialogue from the film. Tracks 1 through 4 are mixed together as a seamless piece; tracks 5 through 7 have silence between them, and the final tracks, 8 through 12, are mixed into another seamless piece.

Official Vangelis score
No.	Title	Length
1.	"Main Titles"	3:42
2.	"Blush Response"	5:47
3.	"Wait for Me"	5:27
4.	"Rachel's Song"	4:46
5.	"Love Theme"	4:56
6.	"One More Kiss, Dear"	3:58
7.	"Blade Runner Blues"	8:53
8.	"Memories of Green"	5:05
9.	"Tales of the Future"	4:46
10.	"Damask Rose"	2:32
11.	"Blade Runner (End Titles)"	4:40
12.	"Tears in Rain"	3:00
Total length:		57:53

==== 2007 release ====
Blade Runner Trilogy, 25th Anniversary

Film score by Vangelis
- Released: December 10, 2007
- Genres: Film score; new-age; electronica
- Length: 149:38
- Label: Universal Records
- Producer: Vangelis

Vangelis chronology
Alexander (2004)	Blade Runner Trilogy, 25th Anniversary (2007)	El Greco Original Motion Picture Soundtrack (2007)

Professional ratings
Review scores
Source	Rating
Allmusic	3.5/5 stars
BBC Music	positive
Filmtracks	2/5 stars
Pitchfork	7.7 stars on a 10 point scale
Soundtrack.Net	2/5 stars

Blade Runner Trilogy: 25th Anniversary, a 3-CD set, was released in 2007 to coincide with the 5-DVD release to mark the 25th anniversary of the film. It includes the 1994 official CD along with two bonus CDs, both compiled from original material by Vangelis. The second disc includes some previously officially unreleased material, but is still not complete, omitting the "Main Title" track, for example. The third disc contains new material inspired by Blade Runner. Each track is a separate piece, separated by silence, rather than any of them being mixed together seamlessly as was the case with all but three tracks in the 1994 version.

25th Anniversary Disc 2
No.	Title	Length
1.	"Longing"	1:58
2.	"Unveiled Twinkling Space"	1:59
3.	"Dr. Tyrell's Owl"	2:40
4.	"At Mr. Chew's"	4:47
5.	"Leo's Room [sic]"	2:21
6.	"One Alone" (Bonus Track)	2:23
7.	"Deckard and Roy's Duel"	6:16
8.	"Dr. Tyrell's Death"	3:11
9.	"Desolation Path" (Bonus Track)	5:45
10.	"Empty Streets"	6:16
11.	"Mechanical Dolls"	2:52
12.	"Fading Away"	3:32
Total length:		43:17

25th Anniversary Disc 3
No.	Title	Length
1.	"Launch Approval"	1:54
2.	"Up and Running"	3:09
3.	"Mail from India"	3:27
4.	"BR Downtown"	2:27
5.	"Dimitri's Bar"	3:52
6.	"Sweet Solitude"	6:56
7.	"No Expectation Boulevard"	6:44
8.	"Vadavarot"	4:14
9.	"Perfume Exotico"	5:19
10.	"Spotkanie z matką"	5:09
11.	"Piano in an Empty Room"	3:37
12.	"Keep Asking"	1:29
Total length:		48:14

Although this release claims to be the "complete" score, there is still some music heard in the film that is missing.

The second disc, of previously unreleased music, contains additional music not present in the film, including two bonus tracks. One of these, "Desolation Path", is a slightly different version of "Alternate Love Theme/I Dreamt Music". This track was originally used in the workprint version of the film, during the Deckard/Rachael love scene.

=== Orchestral release ===
Blade Runner

Film score by New American Orchestra
- Released: 1982
- Length: 33:38
- Label: Full Moon

Professional ratings
Review scores
Source	Rating
AllMusic	2/5 stars

The first official release (on LP, tape and CD) was a reinterpretation by the New American Orchestra in 1982. Billed as an "orchestral adaptation of music composed for the motion picture by Vangelis", this release consisted of jazz-inspired, orchestrated renditions of the major tracks from the film, but not the original score tracks.

New American Orchestra
No.	Title	Length
1.	"Love Theme"	4:12
2.	"Main Title"	5:01
3.	"One More Kiss, Dear"	4:00
4.	"Memories of Green"	4:50
5.	"End Title"	4:17
6.	"Blade Runner Blues"	4:38
7.	"Farewell"	3:10
8.	"End Title Reprise"	3:08
Total length:		33:16

== Bootlegs ==
The delays and poor reproductions of the Blade Runner score led to the production of many bootleg recordings over the years. A bootleg tape surfaced in 1982 at science fiction conventions and became popular, given the delay of an official release of the original recordings. In 1993 "Off World Music, Ltd." created a bootleg CD that would prove more comprehensive than Vangelis' official CD in 1994. A disc from "Gongo Music" features most of the same material, but more of it. The Deck Definitive Edition came about in 2001, with 27 tracks. In 2002, the "Esper Edition" bootleg surfaced, followed by "Los Angeles, November 2019" in 2003. The double-disc "Esper Edition" combined tracks from the official release, the Gongo boot and the film itself. Finally, "2019" provided a single-disc compilation almost wholly consisting of ambient sound from the film, padded out with some sounds from the Westwood game Blade Runner.

=== Studio tape ===
The first release of the Blade Runner score in any form was a tape suspected of coming from a sound engineer during the film's mixing. It was popular, despite subpar audio quality, given there were no plans to release a Vangelis score.

Bootleg tape (1982)
Side A	Side B
1. Los Angeles, November 2019 (1:46)	9. Tales of the Future (4:46)
2. Leon's Interrogation (1:12)	10. Dangerous Days (1:02)
3. Lift-Off (1:10)	11. Wounded Animals (10:58)
4. Deckard Meets Rachael (1:29)	12. Tears in Rain (2:41)
5. One More Kiss, Dear (4:00)	13. End Titles (7:24)
6. Blade Runner Blues (10:19)	
7. Love Theme (4:57)	
8. The Prodigal Son Brings Death (3:35)	
Total tape time: (55:19)

=== Off World Music ===
A second bootleg, Original Motion Picture Soundtrack: Blade Runner, appeared in 1993 by "Off World Music, Ltd." on CD. Issued as a limited edition of 2000 numbered copies, it was of high quality and more comprehensive than the official release by Vangelis in 1994. This release includes the 1939 recording "If I Didn't Care" by R&B group The Ink Spots that originally appeared in the workprint of Blade Runner, but was replaced by the Don Percival cut "One More Kiss, Dear" in the final version.

Off World Music Bootleg
1. Ladd Company Logo (0:24) John Williams
2. Main Titles and Prologue (4:03)
3. Los Angeles, November 2019 (1:46)
4. Deckard Meets Rachael (1:29)
5. Bicycle Riders (2:05) Gail Laughton
6. Memories of Green (5:39)
7. Blade Runner Blues (10:19)
8. Deckard's Dream (1:12)
9. On the Trail of Nexus 6 (5:30)
10. If I Didn't Care (3:03) Jack Lawrence [WP only]
11. Love Theme (4:57)
12. The Prodigal Son Brings Death (3:35)
13. Dangerous Days (1:02)
14. Wounded Animals (10:58)
15. Tears in Rain (2:41)
16. End Titles (7:24)
17. One More Kiss Dear (4:00) Skellern & Vangelis
18. Trailer and Alternate Main Titles (1:39) Robert Randles
Total disc time: 72:42

=== Gongo Music ===
In 1995, a disc from Romanian label "Gongo Music, Ltd" was issued as a limited edition of 3000 copies. It contained mostly the same music as the Off World Music release, but included one track, "Blimpvert", which had not appeared on any previous releases. This track contains an excerpt from "Ogi no Mato" by Ensemble Nipponia.

Gongo Music Bootleg
1. Tema de Semnatura a Companiei Ladd (Ladd Company Logo) (0:25)
2. Titlurile si Prologurile Principale (Main Titles and Prologue) (3:58)
3. Los Angeles, Noiembrie, 2019 (Los Angeles, November 2019) (1:46)
4. Intalnirea lui Deckard cu Rachel (Deckard Meets Rachael) (1:28)
5. Ciclisti (Bicycle Riders) (2:12)
6. Amintirile Verdelui (Memories of Green) (5:40)
7. Tristetile lui Blade Runner (Blade Runner Blues) (10:20)
8. Visul lui Deckard (Deckard's Dream) (1:13)
9. La Procesul lui Nexus 6 (On the Trail of Nexus 6) (5:28)
10. Inca un Sarut, Draga (One More Kiss, Dear) (4:02)
11. Tema Iubirii (Love Theme) (4:59)
12. Fiul Multiubit Aduce Moartea (The Prodigal Son Brings Death) (3:34)
13. Blimpvert (Blimp Advertisements) (2:52)
14. Zile Periculoase (Dangerous Days) (1:03)
15. Animale Ranite (Wounded Animals) (10:59)
16. Lacrimi in Ploaie (Tears in Rain) (2:43)
17. Titlurile de Sfirsit (End Titles) (7:56)
Total disc time: 70:17

=== Deck Definitive Edition ===
In 2001, a 27-track CD from Japanese label "Deck Art" was released as a limited edition of 500 copies with high-quality sound. No track list was provided, but the disc contained material found on earlier bootlegs, as well as music that had not appeared on any previous releases.

=== Esper Edition ===
In 2002 the bootleg Blade Runner: Esper Edition by "Esper Productions" was created as a limited edition of 10 copies, providing a comprehensive Blade Runner soundtrack. It contains some background music that has never been released.

Esper Edition Bootleg
Disc One	Disc Two
1. Prologue and Main Titles (3:54)	1. Deckard's Dream (1:10)
2. Leon's Voight Kampff Test (1:09)	2. Thinking of Rachael (1:18)
3. Sushi Bar – Damask Rose (2:46)	3. Esper Analysis (2:34)
4. Spinner Ascent (1:21)	4. Animoid Row (2:34)
5. Blush Response (5:43)	5. Taffey Lewis Night Club (2:02)
6. Wait for Me (5:12)	6. Salome's Dance (1:23)
7. Deckard Meets Rachael (1:36)	7. Zhora's Retirement (1:42)
8. Rachael's Song (4:20)	8. I Am the Business (2:29)
9. Tales of the Future (4:53)	9. Love Theme (4:58)
10. Bicycle Riders (2:10)	10. I Dreamt Music (4:32)
11. Chew's Eye Lab (1:15)	11. Morning at the Bradbury (3:46)
12. Memories of Green (5:35)	12. The Prodigal Son Brings Death (4:07)
13. Blade Runner Blues (10:01)	13. Deckard Enters the Bradbury (3:37)
14. Pris Meets J.F. Sebastian (1:47)	14. Dangerous Days (0:57)
15. One More Kiss, Dear (4:04)	15. Wounded Animals (10:53)
	16. Tears in Rain (2:51)
	17. Rachael Sleeps (2:08)
	18. End Titles (4:06)
Total disc time: 55:46	Total disc time: 57:07

Esper Edition notes:

- Original music composed and performed by Vangelis
- "Harps of the Ancient Temples" (Bicycle Riders) written and performed by Gail Laughton
- Vocals performed on tracks 3, 9 (disc I) and track 5 (disc II) by Demis Roussos
- Vocals performed on "Rachael's Song" by Mary Hopkin
- Saxophone on tracks 2 and 9 (disc II) by Dick Morrissey
- Lyrics and vocals on "One More Kiss‚ Dear" by Don Percival (Note: the official 1994 release credits the vocals to Don Percival but the lyrics to English singer/composer Peter Skellern)
- "Salome's Dance" includes a snippet that the band Orchestral Manoeuvres in the Dark expanded into the single "Junk Culture" from the album of the same name, released in 1984.

The Esper bootleg edition was expanded in 2017 and renamed the Esper 'Retirement' Edition, consisting of six discs (five CD-DA and one DVD-ROM). It incorporated the missing tracks from the trilogy release.

Other authors, and iTunes, state the Gail Laughton piece is called "Pompeii 76 A.D." from his album Harps Of The Ancient Temples.

== Legacy ==
The film score and soundtrack is widely considered a "classic" and "genius" work of art and one of the best of all time. In 2019, Pitchfork rated it the best film score of all time out of 50, stating "it's shocking to consider that Blade Runner did not get nominated for the Best Picture Academy Award, or any other major Oscars. Equally bewildering is the fact that Vangelis won Best Original Score for 1981's conventionally pretty Chariots of Fire, but wasn't even honorably mentioned for his far richer contributions to Blade Runner". In 2020, The Guardian included it among 10 best film soundtracks. In 2021, the "Main Titles" was rated as the greatest synth sound of all time out of 40 by Computer Music. In 2022, the Future Music magazine placed the soundtrack first among "10 of the most incredible synth film soundtracks from Hollywood history".

In 2017, a sequel to Blade Runner was released, Blade Runner 2049. Hans Zimmer and Benjamin Wallfisch collaborated on the Blade Runner 2049 score, and the original Blade Runner soundtrack served as inspiration for their work. The composers included a Yamaha CS-80 analog synthesizer among the instruments in an effort to maintain stylistic continuity with Vangelis's original 1982 film score. Zimmer said of the soundtrack: "Ridley [Scott] is a hard act to follow – as is Vangelis. While Ben [Wallfisch] was four years old, I had actually experienced all of this. We watched and literally, as we stopped watching, we decided on the palette. We decided this wasn't going to be an orchestral thing. The story spoke to us." The sequel score includes a fairly faithful remake of the original "Tears in Rain" (retitled "Tears in the Rain") and borrows many musical cues from the original Vangelis score throughout, including its frequent use of pitch bending.

== Charts ==
1994 chart performance for Blade Runner: Original Motion Picture Soundtrack
Chart (1994)	Peak position
Australian Albums (ARIA)	79
Hungarian Albums (MAHASZ)	19
UK Albums (Official Charts)	20

2008 chart performance for Blade Runner: Original Motion Picture Soundtrack
Chart (2008)	Peak position
Spanish Albums (Promusicae)	42

2026 chart performance for Blade Runner: Original Motion Picture Soundtrack
Chart (2026)	Peak position
Greek Albums (IFPI)	76

== Certifications and sales ==
Certifications for Blade Runner: Original Motion Picture Soundtrack
Region	Certification	Certified units/sales
Brazil (Pro-Música Brasil)	Gold	197,000
Spain (Promusicae)	Gold	50,000^{^}
United Kingdom (BPI)	Gold	100,000^{^}
^{^} Shipments figures based on certification alone.
