= Chariots of Fire (instrumental) =

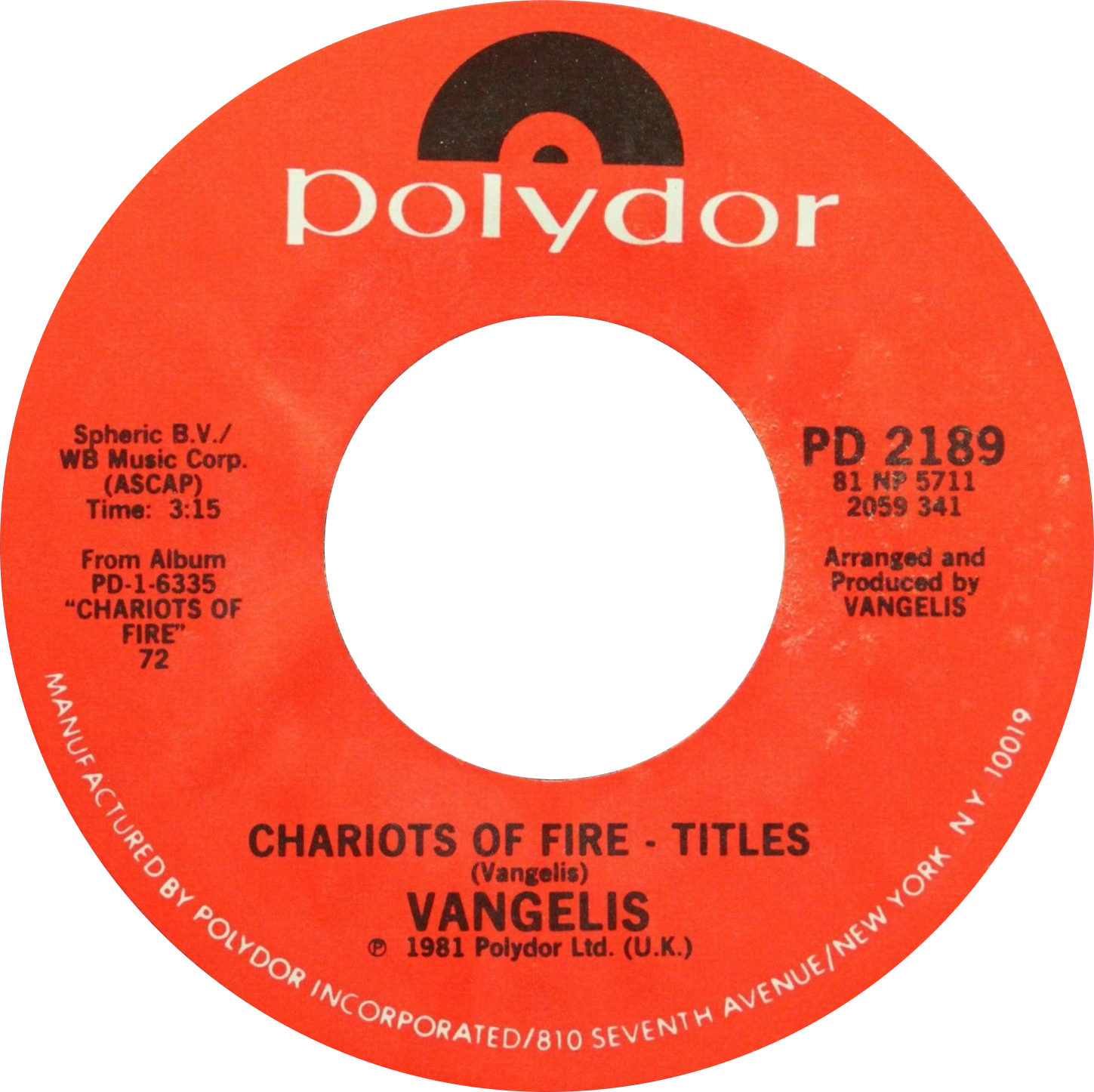
- One of side-A labels of US single

Single by Vangelis

from the album Chariots of Fire
- B-side: "Eric's Theme"
- Released: April 1981 (UK); December 1981 (US)
- Recorded: 1980
- Genre: Orchestral pop, film score, symphonic
- Length: 3:32
- Label: Polydor
- Songwriter: Vangelis
- Producer: Vangelis

Vangelis singles chronology
"My Love" (1980)	"Chariots of Fire" (1981)	"Cosmos Theme" (1981)

Alternative release
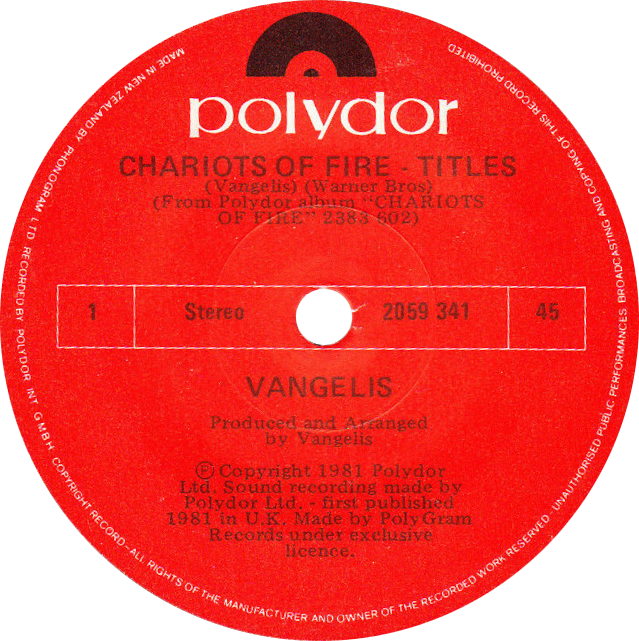
- Side A of New Zealand single

"Chariots of Fire" is an instrumental theme written and recorded by Vangelis for the soundtrack of the 1981 film of the same name. The theme was released as a single and reached number one on the US Billboard Hot 100 in 1982. It was also a top-20 hit in the UK, Ireland, Canada and New Zealand. It has been covered by numerous performers and used for various television programs and sporting events.

== Overview ==
On the film's soundtrack album, the piece is called "Titles" because of its use in the movie's opening titles sequence, but it widely became known as "Chariots of Fire".

When the single debuted at #94 on the Billboard Hot 100 during the week ending 12 December 1981, it was known as "Titles". Seven weeks later, when it moved to #68 on the Hot 100 chart dated 30 January 1982, the single was listed as "Chariots of Fire"; it stayed with that name for the remainder of its chart run. The new name made it easier for both listeners and radio DJs to identify the piece.

According to AllMusic, the track was listed as "Chariots of Fire – Titles" on the U.S. Billboard Hot 100 chart, and simply as "Chariots of Fire" on the Adult Contemporary chart. A 1989 CD single release also gave the name of the piece as "Chariots of Fire".

== Reception ==
In a retrospective review of the theme, Tom Breihan from Stereogum wrote, "The melody itself is warm and pretty and instantly identifiable. With those six notes, Vangelis gets across a combination of exhilaration and contemplation."

== Allegations of plagiarism ==
Vangelis was accused of plagiarising "Chariots of Fire" from a piece by fellow Greek composer Stavros Logaridis called "The City of Violets". Vangelis won in court by persuading the judge that he had had no opportunity to hear Logaridis' piece before he composed "Chariots of Fire" and by demonstrating to the judge's satisfaction that the key musical sequence described as "the turn" (which consisted of the four notes F-G-A-G) – the only sequence where the judge noted a clear similarity between the two compositions – was already common in music, and had previously been used by Vangelis in the piece "Wake Up" by Aphrodite's Child that predated "City of Violets".

== Chart performance ==
"Chariots of Fire" stayed for one week at number one on the Billboard Hot 100 in May 1982, after climbing steadily for five months (it made #1 in its 22nd week on the chart), and to date remains the only piece by a Greek artist to top the U.S. charts.

The single spent 64 weeks on the Australian charts, although it peaked at only #21. In Japan, "Chariots of Fire" was the best-selling single of 1981. The track proved moderately successful in the UK, where it reached #12, but its parent album peaked at #5 and spent 107 weeks on the album chart.

The single reached #3 (2012), #18 (2014), and #16 (2015) on the Billboard Classical Digital Songs chart.

== Charts ==
=== Weekly charts ===
Chart (1981–1982)	Peak position
Australia (Kent Music Report)	21
Belgium (Ultratop 50 Flanders)	13
Canada Top Singles (RPM)	4
Ireland (IRMA)	15
Netherlands (Dutch Top 40)	12
New Zealand (Recorded Music NZ)	8
South Africa (Springbok Radio)	3
UK Singles (Official Charts Company)	12
US Billboard Hot 100	1
US Billboard Adult Contemporary	1
US Cash Box Top 100	1

=== Year-end charts ===
Chart (1982)	Rank
Australia (Kent Music Report)	43
Canada	39
New Zealand	37
US Billboard Hot 100	12
US Cash Box Top 100	10

== Music video ==
The music video for "Chariots of Fire" shows Vangelis playing a piano and percussion instruments in a concert hall, Vangelis playing a synthesizer in a recording studio, and scenes from the film.

== Cover versions ==
Many cover versions of "Chariots of Fire" have been recorded in all styles by various artists, including the orchestral sounds of John Williams and the Boston Pops, the electric guitars of The Shadows, the soft piano of Richard Clayderman, the pan flute of Zamfir, and the jazz of The Bad Plus.

Vocal recordings of "Chariots of Fire" have been made by Melissa Manchester, Jane Olivor, Mireille Mathieu, Demis Roussos, and various others, all with the lyrics from "Race to the End" provided by Jon Anderson.

== Appearances in other media ==
In light of its original use, the piece is often used for comedic effect in numerous slow-motion sequences and/or parodies of the sports genre in various films, television episodes, and commercials.

It was played when Apple Inc.'s co-founder and chairman Steve Jobs introduced the first Macintosh computer on 24 January 1984 at a technology demonstration event, and at another press conference celebrating the 100-day anniversary of the release of the first Macintosh.

=== Olympics ===
Owing both to its sweeping tune and the content of the movie in which it first appeared, "Chariots of Fire" has become widely associated with the Olympic Games. The BBC used the piece as the theme music for its coverage of the 1984 Summer Olympics held in Los Angeles and also the 1988 Summer Olympics in Seoul. It was also used as a theme for the 1984 Winter Olympics in Sarajevo, and it was played prior to the start of the men's 100m race final at the 1996 Summer Olympics in Atlanta.

It became prominent leading up to and during the 2012 Summer Olympics in London. Runners in a test event at Olympic Park, whose route ended at the grand opening of London's Olympic Stadium, were greeted by the piece as they finished their route into the new stadium. The piece was also used to fanfare the carriers of the Olympic flame on parts of its route through the UK. The piece, and remixes of it, was also used during each medal ceremony of the games.

The piece was also performed by the London Symphony Orchestra under the conductor of Sir Simon Rattle during the opening ceremony of the games, as part of a skit starring comedian Rowan Atkinson reprising his role as Mr. Bean, seen playing a repeated note on a synthesizer whilst using a cellphone, and later an umbrella to play the note while trying to grab a tissue to blow his nose, and then falling into a daydream parodying the opening "beach run" scene from the Chariots of Fire film itself.

== See also ==
- List of Hot 100 number-one singles of 1982 (U.S.)
- List of number-one adult contemporary singles of 1982 (U.S.)
