= See You Later =

Studio album by Vangelis
- Released: November 1980
- Recorded: Nemo Studios, London
- Genre: Electronica
- Length: 39:32
- Label: Polydor
- Producer: Vangelis

Vangelis chronology
Opera Sauvage (1979)	See You Later (1980)	Chariots of Fire (1981)

Professional ratings
Review scores
Source	Rating
Allmusic	1.5/5 stars

See You Later is an album by the Greek electronic composer Vangelis, released in November 1980. It breaks quite violently with the style he employed in the late 1970s and later, relying much more on vocals and being more experimental and returning (in many respects) to his early 1970s work like Earth or 666. It was never released in the United States, until it was remastered in 2016 as part of the Delectus boxset.

== Overview ==
See You Later is Vangelis' most wide-ranging work of the 1980s, with more radical musical and lyrical themes than are found in his other albums. The concept album is bleaker than most of his records, incorporating negative and satirical intonations of a dystopian future. Subjects touched on include funerals, masks, and ready-to-wear and ready-to-eat things.

The lyrics are written by Vangelis in English, French and Italian; they use electronic terminology and incorporate references to lost love, and the downfall of humanity due to the influence of technology. The title track lyrics say "See you later then... alive or dead". Track "Suffocation" was inspired by the Seveso disaster in Italy.

The album's sleeve shows an ice-covered ocean with a young woman wearing sunglasses to protect her eyes; the image uses optical compression in the horizontal axis. The inner sleeve is also disturbing, displaying a character seated in a greenhouse holding a lifeless child in its hands, both wearing eerie-looking gas masks.

== Instruments and style ==
Vangelis plays all instruments: synthesizers, electric piano, grand piano and drums. The Korg KR-55 drum machine is used extensively. Michel Ripoche plays the violin on #4. Vocals featured are by Jon Anderson (tracks #5 and #6), Peter Marsh (track #1), Christina and Maurizio Arcieri from the group Krisma (track #5) and Cherry Vanilla (track #4 narrative).

== Composition ==
"I Can't Take It Anymore" is sung by Peter Marsh through a vocoder over a deep synthesizer glissando bass and a synthesizer choir.

"Memories of Green" is a slow piano-based piece with a backdrop of synthesizer sounds and bleeps from the 1978 Bambino electronic game "UFO Master Blaster Station". The piano used on this piece was a Steinway Grand piano. Its distinctive "drunk" sound was achieved with the use of an Electroharmonix Electric Mistress flanger pedal. This song was used in Vangelis' subsequent soundtrack to the 1982 film Blade Runner.

"Not A Bit – All Of It" has vocals by Cherry Vanilla. "Suffocation" features vocals by Jon Anderson and a narrative in Italian, by Krisma (Maurizio Arcieri and Christina Moser). "See You Later" has Vangelis on electric piano and staccato male atonal choir. About halfway through, there is a child narrative in French, with Anderson's vocals used in the finale.

== Track listing ==
All songs composed and written by Vangelis.

No.	Title	Length
1.	"I Can't Take It Anymore"	5:42
2.	"Multi-Track Suggestion"	5:36
3.	"Memories of Green"	5:48
4.	"Not a Bit – All of It"	3:00
5.	"Suffocation"	9:26
6.	"See You Later"	10:22

Delectus bonus tracks
No.	Title	Length
7.	"Neighbours Above"	4:53
8.	"My Love"	4:11
9.	"Domestic Logic 1"	3:19

The track "Memories of Green" was later used by Vangelis in his soundtrack for the 1982 film Blade Runner.

== Personnel ==
- Vangelis – synthesisers and all instruments
- Peter Marsh - vocals on "I Can't Take It Anymore" and "Multi-Track Suggestion"
- Jon Anderson – vocals on "Suffocation" and "See You Later"
- Cherry Vanilla, Andrew Hoy – vocals on "Not a Bit – All of It"
- Michel Ripoche – violin on "Not a Bit – All of It"

== Production ==
- Vangelis : Producer, arranger, photography, design
- Raphael Preston, John Walker : Engineers
- Raine Shine : Studio assistant
- Veronique Skawinska, Alwyn Clayden : Design, photography
