= 1492: Conquest of Paradise (album) =

Soundtrack album by Vangelis
- Released: 12 October 1992
- Recorded: 1992
- Genres: Instrumental, electronic
- Length: 54:44
- Label: Atlantic/WEA
- Producer: Vangelis

Vangelis chronology
| The City (1990) | 1492: Conquest of Paradise (1992) | Blade Runner (1994) |

Singles from 1492: Conquest of Paradise
- 1. "Conquest of Paradise" Released: 19 October 1992; 2. "Twenty Eighth Parallel" Released: 15 March 1993

Alternative cover
- Alternate album cover

Professional ratings
Review scores
| Source | Rating |
|---|---|
| Allmusic | 4.5/5 stars |
| Sputnikmusic | 4.5/5 stars |

1492: Conquest of Paradise is a 1992 music score to the film of the same name by Greek electronic composer and artist Vangelis. The film, a recount of the voyage to America in 1492 by Christopher Columbus, was directed by Ridley Scott, for whom Vangelis had previously composed the music score for Blade Runner, in 1982. The album and the single "Conquest of Paradise" enjoyed a revival in 1995 for various reasons and broke many sales records.

Due to the soundtrack's success, Vangelis won an Echo Award as "International Artist of the Year", and RTL Golden Lion Award for the "Best Title Theme for a TV Film or a Series" in 1996. The album was nominated for "Best Original Score - Motion Picture" at the 50th Golden Globe Awards in 1993.

== Track listing ==
1. "Opening" – 1:21
2. "Conquest of Paradise" – 4:47
3. "Monastery of La Rábida" – 3:39
4. "City of Isabel" – 2:16
5. "Light and Shadow" – 3:46
6. "Deliverance" – 3:28
7. "West Across the Ocean Sea" – 2:53
8. "Eternity" – 1:59
9. "Hispañola" – 4:56
10. "Moxica and the Horse" – 7:06
11. "Twenty Eighth Parallel" – 5:14
12. "Pinta, Niña, Santa María (Into Eternity)" – 13:19

A number of pieces can be identified in the film, but it is clear that Scott preferred "Hispañola" (track 9) to set the tone of the film, rather than "Conquest of Paradise" (track 2).

The CD was released in each market with one of two different covers.

A Single disc was released with four tracks, two of which were not included in the album:

1. "Conquest of Paradise" – 4:47
2. "Moxica and the Horse" – 7:12
3. "Line Open" – 4:43
4. "Landscape" – 1:37

== Instrumentation ==
On this soundtrack, Vangelis plays together with a number of performers, including two Flamenco guitarists and vocalists, violin, mandolin and flutes. As on a number of previous albums by Vangelis, the English Chamber Choir, directed by Guy Protheroe, performs the choral parts.

The sound engineering was done by Philippe Colonna and coordination by French musician Frederick Rousseau (also known for his collaborations with Jean-Michel Jarre), who has been Vangelis's studio partner since the 1980s till the recording of the Alexander soundtrack.

Vangelis plays all synthesizers, using mainly string patches but also several ethnic ones, to reflect the character of the film, and electric piano and harp patches. Some calmer, atmospheric pieces (tracks 3, 7, 11 and 12) are entirely performed by Vangelis, using pianos, strings and harp.

For the ethnic music, Vangelis consulted with French specialist Xavier Belanger, who has advised other artists on similar issues, including Jean-Michel Jarre.

A video clip was shot in Paris with Vangelis in his Epsilon Studios (since dismantled), with the choir performing.

== Lyrics ==
In "Monastery of La Rabida" and "Deliverance", the choir sings latin hymns ("De Profundis" and "Dies Irae, respectively"). In "Conquest of Paradise" and "Light and Shadow" Vangelis used a pseudo-Latin invented language.

== Revival and popular culture ==
Both the album and the EP had poor sales upon their release in 1992, but success came three years later, in 1995, for disparate reasons: In Germany, local boxer Henry Maske used the album-track "Conquest of Paradise" as his introduction theme during boxing bouts. When he became the IBF world title holder in the light heavyweight category, the piece received wide coverage and a single was hastily released.

The song has also been used as a theme for the Crusaders, a Super Rugby team based in Christchurch, New Zealand, for English rugby league team the Wigan Warriors, for the 2011 Cricket World Cup, and for the 2010 and 2014 cricket World Twenty20 championships. In 1997, it was used as the theme for the Bollywood movie Koyla.

== Charts and sales ==
The soundtrack album charted very well, and went on to be certified gold and platinum in over 17 countries, including Austria, Belgium, Canada, France, Holland, Italy, Poland, Spain, Switzerland, and the U.K., culminating with over million copies in Germany.

The single "Conquest of Paradise" also topped the charts in a number of countries, including 10 weeks at No. 1 in the Netherlands and Germany, where it sold 1.5 million copies, 8 weeks at No. 1 in Belgium and Switzerland.

=== Weekly charts ===
Weekly chart performance for 1492: Conquest of Paradise
| Chart (1992–1998) | Peak position |
|---|---|
| Austrian Albums (Ö3 Austria) | 1 |
| Belgian Albums (Ultratop Flanders) | 2 |
| Belgian Albums (Ultratop Wallonia) | 6 |
| Canada (RPM) | 64 |
| Dutch Albums (Album Top 100) | 1 |
| European Albums (European Top 100 Albums) | 5 |
| French Albums (SNEP) | 65 |
| German Albums (Offizielle Top 100) | 1 |
| Hungarian Albums (MAHASZ) | 1 |
| New Zealand Albums (RMNZ) | 43 |
| Norwegian Albums (VG-lista) | 1 |
| Portuguese Albums (AFP) | 1 |
| Spanish Albums (Promusicae) | 94 |
| Swedish Albums (Sverigetopplistan) | 40 |
| Swiss Albums (Schweizer Hitparade) | 1 |
| UK Albums (Official Charts) | 33 |

2025 weekly chart performance for 1492: Conquest of Paradise
| Chart (2025) | Peak position |
|---|---|
| Croatian International Albums (HDU) | 21 |
| Polish Albums (ZPAV) | 52 |

=== Year-end charts ===
1995 year-end chart performance for 1492: Conquest of Paradise
| Chart (1995) | Position |
|---|---|
| Austrian Albums (Ö3 Austria) | 5 |
| Belgian Albums (Ultratop Flanders) | 8 |
| Belgian Albums (Ultratop Wallonia) | 11 |
| Dutch Albums (Album Top 100) | 4 |
| European Albums (European Top 100 Albums) | 9 |
| German Albums (Offizielle Top 100) | 4 |
| Swiss Albums (Schweizer Hitparade) | 4 |

== Certifications ==
Certifications and sales for 1492: Conquest of Paradise
| Region | Certification | Certified units/sales |
|---|---|---|
| Argentina (CAPIF) | Platinum | 60,000^{^} |
| Austria (IFPI Austria) | 2× Platinum | 100,000^{*} |
| Belgium (BRMA) | 2× Platinum | 100,000^{*} |
| Brazil (Pro-Música Brasil) | Gold | 100,000^{*} |
| France (SNEP) | 2× Platinum | 600,000^{*} |
| Germany (BVMI) | 5× Gold | 1,300,000 |
| Netherlands (NVPI) | 2× Platinum | 200,000^{^} |
| Norway (IFPI Norway) | Platinum | 50,000^{*} |
| Poland (ZPAV) | Gold | 50,000^{*} |
| Spain (Promusicae) | 2× Platinum | 200,000^{^} |
| Switzerland (IFPI Switzerland) | 2× Platinum | 100,000^{^} |
| United Kingdom (BPI) | Gold | 100,000^{^} |
^{*} Sales figures based on certification alone.^{^} Shipments figures based on certification alone.

== See also ==
- 50th Golden Globe Awards nominees
- List of best-selling albums in Germany
