= Antarctica (Vangelis album) =

Film score by Vangelis
- Released: 1983
- Studios: Nemo Studios, London
- Genres: Electronic, film score
- Length: 45:29
- Label: Polydor
- Producer: Vangelis

Vangelis chronology
Chariots of Fire (1981)	Antarctica (1983)	Soil Festivities (1984)

Antarctica is a soundtrack album by the Greek electronic composer Vangelis, released in 1983. It is the score of the 1983 Japanese film Antarctica ("Nankyoku Monogatari", lit. "South Pole Story") directed by Koreyoshi Kurahara, and was nominated by the Japan Academy for "Best Music Score".

== Composition ==
Synthesisers of "Theme from Antarctica" conjure cold and desolation, but also a bright landscape not lacking in beauty. "Antarctica Echoes" has minimal melody showing the vastness of the landscape. "Song of White" is cold-sounding, while "The Other Side of Antarctica" has a sinister sound. "Deliverance" is the theme that plays at the end of the film.

== Reception ==
Professional ratings
Review scores
Source	Rating
Allmusic	3/5 stars

Jim Brenholts of Allmusic described it as a very good "dynamic and dramatic set" of music, "conveying feelings of angst, isolation, and even desolation", but "does not convey the iciness that listeners would expect".

== Track listing ==
All music is composed by Vangelis.

No.	Title	Length
1.	"Theme from Antarctica"	7:29
2.	"Antarctica Echoes"	5:58
3.	"Kinematic"	3:50
4.	"Song of White"	5:17
5.	"Life of Antarctica"	5:59
6.	"Memory of Antarctica"	5:30
7.	"Other Side of Antarctica"	6:56
8.	"Deliverance"	4:30

== Personnel ==
- Vangelis – composer of all instruments

Production

- Vangelis – producer, arranger, sleeve design
- Raine Shine – engineer
- Alwyn Clayden – sleeve design
