= Opéra sauvage =

Opéra Sauvage

Soundtrack album by Vangelis
- Released: 1979
- Recorded: 1978–79
- Studios: Nemo Studios, London
- Genre: Electronic
- Length: 43:06
- Label: Polydor
- Producer: Vangelis

Vangelis chronology
Odes (1979)	Opéra Sauvage (1979)	See You Later (1980)

Singles from Opéra Sauvage
- 1. "Hymne" Released: 1979 (Netherlands); 2. "L'Enfant" Released: 1979 (EU)

Opéra Sauvage is a soundtrack album by the Greek electronic composer Vangelis, released in 1979. It is the score for the nature documentary TV series of the same title by French filmmaker Frédéric Rossif. It is considered one of Vangelis' best albums and is his second most successful album in the USA, reaching #42 in the album charts.

== Overview ==
Vangelis produced this album during his electro-acoustic period, which was one of the most productive in his musical career. Opéra Sauvage is more akin to his classic sound than his earlier nature scores for the same director, Frédéric Rossif, such as L'Apocalypse des animaux and La Fête sauvage. A later collaboration with Rossif in the style of Opéra sauvage was Sauvage et Beau.

"Hymne" was re-recorded in choral version for the 1991 Eureka concert by Vangelis in Rotterdam.

== Release ==
The album reached #42 in the Billboard 200, and stayed in the charts for 39 weeks.

== Instrumentation ==
Vangelis plays several synthesizers, piano, Fender Rhodes electric piano (featured extensively on "Rêve"), drums, percussion, xylophone, as well as acoustic and bass guitar ("Chromatique"). Jon Anderson is credited with playing harp on "Flamants Roses".

== Composition ==
The album is full of classical-based and warm melodies, orchestrated with Yamaha CS-80 sounds. "Hymne", "L'Enfant", "Mouettes" and "Irlande" build on fairly simple themes that are developed instrumentally. "Rêve" is, indeed, as the title suggests, a dreamy calm piece with the hint of jazz in the climax. "Chromatique" has a chromatic instrumental line with chords on an acoustic guitar. "Flamants Roses", finally, consists of several parts, from slow to upbeat, and finishing off with a bluesy finale; Jon Anderson features prominently on harp.

== Reception ==
Professional ratings
Review scores
Source	Rating
Allmusic	4.5/5 stars

In the Allmusic review it is described as "rich, electronic orchestrations range from grandly symphonic to simple and serene" and as an "excellent introduction to his music".

== Track listing ==
No.	Title	Length
1.	"Hymne"	2:40
2.	"Rêve"	12:26
3.	"L'Enfant"	4:57
4.	"Mouettes"	2:28
5.	"Chromatique"	3:25
6.	"Irlande"	4:43
7.	"Flamants Roses"	11:50

== Personnel ==
- Vangelis – synthesisers and all instruments
- Jon Anderson – harp on "Flamants Roses"

Production

- Vangelis – producer, arranger, artwork and cover design
- Keith Spencer-Allen, Raphael Preston, Marlis Duncklau – engineers
- Raphael Preston, Marlis Duncklau – assistant engineers
- Hitoshi Takiguchi – mastering engineer
- Veronique Skawinska – photography
- Tokiwa Kinoshita – art coordinator
- Minoru Harada – product manager

== Other appearances ==
- A documentary on the Chariots of Fire (1981) special-edition DVD video relates that director Hugh Hudson intended to use the 7/4 piece "L'Enfant", which he was particularly fond of, as the opening titles over the first scene on the beach, until Vangelis talked him into letting him compose the iconic Chariots of Fire theme. The director then had "L'Enfant" being played in the film by a brass band as source music. A re-recorded version of "Hymne" was used as the score cue for Eric Liddell's first race in the Scottish Highlands.
- "L'Enfant" features prominently in two romantic scenes in Peter Weir's 1982 film The Year of Living Dangerously.
- It was also used as the theme for the 1980 Winter Olympics in USA.
- "Hymne" was the tune of Barilla pasta television advertisements aired in Italy throughout the 1980s. In the US, it was the tune for Ernest & Julio Gallo wine advertisements.
- "L'enfant" was the main title music of the Hungarian TV program "A Hét" (The Week) in the late 1980s and the early 1990s.
- A sample of "Rêve" was used in the 2002 single "Solarcoaster" by Solarstone.

== Charts ==
=== Weekly charts ===
Chart (1987)	Peak position
US Billboard 200	42

=== Year-end charts ===
Chart (1987)	Position
US Billboard 200	98
