= China (Vangelis album) =

Studio album by Vangelis
- Released: April 1979
- Recorded: 1978
- Studios: Nemo Studios, London
- Genre: Electronica
- Length: 41:17
- Label: Polydor
- Producer: Vangelis

Vangelis chronology
The Dragon (1978)	China (1979)	Odes (1979)

Singles from China
- 1. "The Long March" Released: 1 June 1979

China is a studio album by the Greek electronic composer Vangelis, released in April 1979. Although he had never been to China, he employed Chinese instruments and compositional styles on this concept album. The album received some critical praise. It was certified silver (1985) for sales of over 60,000 copies by BPI.

== Overview ==
At the end of 1978, Vangelis was without a record label contract (the previous official Beaubourg was his final with RCA Records), and the next company which supported his recordings was Polydor Records (which already held the rights to the "Sauvage" series of albums).

It is a loose concept album, inspired by the culture, history, and music of China. Vangelis in a 1979 interview said: "I've never been there, I had the idea long before the events that placed China at the forefront of the news. For years I have been passionate about the Chinese. I am not talking about politics, I am talking about the old China, the new China as well, about this enormous nation and the people who live there. What is happening there is miraculous, it touches me".

He "tried to capture in this record China as I feel it, with its peculiar character, its perfume. I find certain resemblances between the music of China and the music of Greece. Of course, I find a lot of musical similarities all around the world", but "I didn't try to do Chinese folk music. I'm not Chinese, but I did something that I felt had this characteristic colour of Chinese music".

The thematic concepts noted in the sleeve range from; "Chung Kuo" (Wade-Giles romanization of Zhongguo) means "China" (or literally "Middle Kingdom"); "The Long March" is inspired by the Long March (1934–1935) with long citation from Red China Today by Edgar Snow; "The Dragon" (Lung) is inspired by the Chinese dragon symbolism, "the spirit of change and the creative force of life. In an endless transformation he unfolds from the deepest caves to rise in the clouds"; "The Plum Blossom" is inspired by the Chinese symbolism of Prunus mume, "sexual vitality"; "The Tao Of Love" is inspired by Zhuang Zhou quote "That which is one is one That which is not one is also one"; "The Little Fete" is inspired by the homonymous poem by the 8th century Li Bai, quoted translation from Taoism by Jean Campbell Cooper; "Yin & Yang" is inspired by the homonymous symbolic duality; "Himalaya" is inspired by the 52nd hexagram 艮 (Gèn or Ken) from I Ching meaning "mountain, to ascend, the solitude, the immovable"; while "Summit" probably by the homonymous summit of symbolic mountain.

The album was promoted with three concerts in Spring of 1979; London's Drury Lane Theatre in April, Brussels Cirque Royal in May, accompanied by the BRIT Symphony Orchestra and Choir, and Paris in June. The cover and back of the album are "melted" images of Vangelis swimming and were taken in the pool of the Hilton Hotel in Athens.

== Release ==
Although Polydor issued this album as POLD-5018, and re-issue as SPELP-19 the track timings of either were never accurate, and confusion exists as to the actual lengths of "Chung Kuo" and "The Long March". Other country releases of China have different track lengths and are probably the more accurate releases of China with the proper track timings: the white noise and effects intro is actually "Chung Kuo" and the long melodic synthesizer track and piano ending is "The Long March". The track listing on the article is from 1983 Polydor edition.

"The Long March" was released as a single, with B-side vocalisation track "The Long March Part 2" performed by Vangelis and children of Orleans Infants School Twickenham, with proceeds being donated to UNICEF.

The album reached #31 on the Dutch album charts in 1979.

== Instrumentation ==
The album was conceived during a very active period in Vangelis' recording career, during which he explored the possibilities of electro-acoustic composing. In 1978 Vangelis had a new mixing desk, 24-track recording equipment - the API-mixer and Scully 16-track from Beaubourg were replaced by Lyrec 24-track and Quad Eight Pacifica mixer, producing much cleaner sound.

Vangelis employs his synthesizer arsenal to the fullest, generating sound effects (steam locomotive on "Chung Kuo") and various Chinese-sounding patches on all tracks. Vangelis plays synthesizers, drum machines, electric piano ("The Tao of Love"), piano ("The Long March", "The Plum Blossom", "Himalaya"), various Chinese flutes and plucked string instruments. Featured artists are Michel Ripoche (violin on "The Plum Blossom"), Yeung Hak-Fun and Koon Fook Man (narrative on "The Little Fete").

== Composition ==
The works do not sound as a world fusion with Chinese music, but more of a superficial influence. "China" is orchestrated set of simple melodies influenced by the sound of Chinese music. "Chung Kuo" begins with clashing percussive noises which change orchestrated melody with sequenced backing. "The Long March" is a piano solo in a neo-classical way. "The Little Fete" sounds like orchestrated chinoiserie. "Himalaya" is long and atmospheric, and uses washes of sound to evoke cold, windswept mountain spaces.

== Reception ==
Professional ratings
Review scores
Source	Rating
Allmusic	4.5/5 stars

John Bush of Allmusic noted that "few tracks use acoustic piano and other organic instruments, the centerpieces "Chung Kuo," "The Dragon" and "Himalaya" use bracing percussion and synthesizer effects to emphasize the subjects", and that Vangelis with the "ringing synthesizer textures and stately rhythms" successfully evoked "the majesty of China".

== Track listing ==
No.	Title	Length
1.	"Chung Kuo"	5:31
2.	"The Long March"	2:01
3.	"The Dragon"	4:13
4.	"The Plum Blossom"	2:36
5.	"The Tao of Love"	2:44
6.	"The Little Fete"	3:01
7.	"Yin & Yang"	5:48
8.	"Himalaya"	10:53
9.	"Summit"	4:30

== Charts ==
Chart (1979)	Position
Australia (Kent Music Report)	96
Netherlands	31

== Personnel ==
- Vangelis – synthesisers and all instruments
- Michel Ripoche – violin solo on "The Plum Blossom"
- Yeung Hak-Fun, Koon Fook Man – recitation on "The Little Fete"

Production

- Vangelis – producer, arranger, sleeve design
- Keith Spencer-Allen, Raphael Preston, Andy Hendriksen – engineers
- Veronique Skawinska – photography

== Cultural appearances ==
- Film director Ridley Scott utilised part of the track The Little Fete as the soundtrack to his 1979 Chanel No. 5 Share the Fantasy commercial, which showed a woman lying beside a swimming pool, and aired on American television well into the 1980s. Scott subsequently employed Vangelis to score his 1982 film Blade Runner.
- "Himalaya" and "The Little Fete" appeared (along with much of Vangelis's other work) in Carl Sagan's 1980 documentary miniseries Cosmos: A Personal Voyage (for instance, "Himalaya" appears in the second episode "One Voice in the Cosmic Fugue", when Sagan tours the interior of a cell and features DNA replication).
- "Chung Kuo" appeared briefly at the end of the final episode of the 1983 BBC documentary The Paras.
- "Chung Kuo" was used in the BBC daytime magazine programme Pebble Mill at the start and finish of presenter Bob Langley films from his trip to Antarctica and the Falkland Islands on HMS Endurance, c. 1983/1984
- "Summit" was used in a 1988 mexican telenovela Amor en Silencio as one of the themes of the telenovela's villain portrayed by Margarita Sanz.
- During the outdoor performances of the Shanghai Expo 2010 opening ceremonies, the track "The Dragon" was used.
- "Chung Kuo" was used in a Mercury Lynx television commercial in the USA in 1981. "Vangelis - Mercury Lynx (1981) USA"
- "Chung Kuo" was used in a SCTV sketch, "Walter Cronkite's Brain", first aired on November 6, 1981.
