= 5 A.M. =

5 A.M. may refer to:

- A time on the 12-hour clock

== Music ==
=== Albums ===
- 5am (album), by Amber Run
- 5AM, album by The Confusions 2006
- 5AM, album by Skipp Whitman 2012
- 5:00 AM, album by Adrian Borland

=== Songs ===
- "5 AM" (Katy B song), 2013
- "5AM" (Lil Baby song), 2024
- "5AM", song by James Yorkston from The Year of the Leopard, 2007
- "5AM", song by Logic from Young Sinatra: Welcome to Forever, 2013
- "5AM", song by Hamilton Leithauser from Black Hours, 2014
- "5AM", song by hip hop group Lost Boyz from LB IV Life
- "5AM", song by The Ballroom from Magic Time 2001
- "5AM (A Love Song)", song by Blue Rodeo from Casino
- "5am", song by Sault from Aiir, 2022
- "5 A.M.", song by David Gilmour from Rattle That Lock, 2015

== See also ==
- 5 After Midnight, British boy band (formerly called 5AM)
- 5 o'clock (disambiguation)
- "Five in the Morning", a song by A from How Ace Are Buildings
