= The Four Horsemen (song) =

- Italian promotional single

Song by Aphrodite's Child

from the album 666
- Released: 1972
- Recorded: 1970
- Genre: Psychedelic rock; progressive rock
- Length: 5:53
- Label: Vertigo
- Composer: Vangelis Papathanassiou
- Lyricist: Costas Ferris
- Producer: Vangelis Papathanassiou

Official video
- "The Four Horsemen" on YouTube

"The Four Horsemen" is a song from the concept album 666 by the psychedelic rock band Aphrodite's Child, considered the album's most renowned track. It has received regular airplay on AOR stations since its release in 1972. Like the album, the song is based on the Book of Revelation.

== Background ==
666 was created as a concept album retelling the story of the Book of Revelation, the Apocalypse of John, the book of the Bible that attacked on the tyranny of the Roman Empire at the time it was written, and the album goes through a number of famous passages and themes, including the Whore of Babylon (Rome), The Beast (Nero), and, in this case, the Four Horsemen of the Apocalypse.

The song's lyrics mostly paraphrase the text of Revelation 6. The song's structure is marked by a dynamic contrast, with Roussos singing over an echoed keyboard drone and wind chimes in the verses, and the chorus containing traditional rock instrumentation highlighted by Sideras' drumming. The song culminates in a two-minute wah guitar solo by Koulouris over heavy drumming by Sideras and a repeated "fa fa fa" background chant by Roussos.

In the song, as in Revelation 5, "The Lamb" is presented with a sealed scroll. This lamb is often taken to mean Jesus (who was referred to as The Lamb of God who will take away the sin of the world" in John 3:36). The Lamb begins opening the scroll in both the book and the song. It has seven seals, and as each of the first four is opened, it releases some crisis represented by a horseman. These horsemen are described in part by the color of their horses, especially in the song:

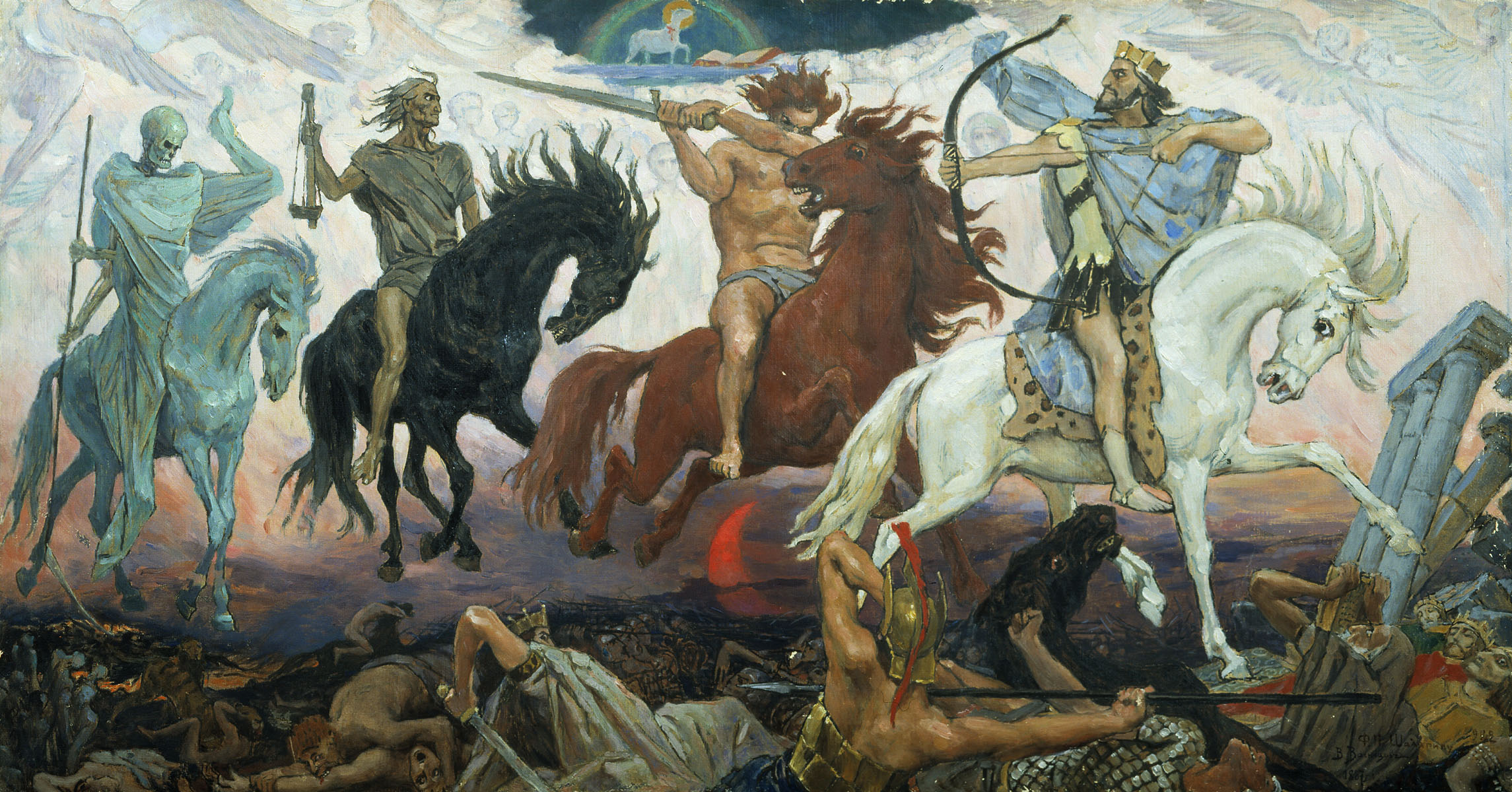
Four Horsemen of the Apocalypse (painting), an 1887 painting by Victor Vasnetsov. The Lamb is visible at the top.

The leading horse is white
The second horse is red
The third one is a black
The last one is a green.

== Impact ==
Receiving significant airplay on album-oriented radio, the song went on to be covered or sampled by a number of bands.

"The Four Horsemen" influenced Beck's "Chemtrails", which has a similar structure, and The Verve's "The Rolling People", which quoted the "fa fa fa" chant. The chorus was also sampled, in a slowed-down fashion, on Daniel Lopatin's "A7", from Chuck Person's Eccojams Vol. 1. The song is popular among metal and techno acts, forming a significant list of covers and samplings.

=== Covers ===
- In 2004, Gregorian released a cover of "The Four Horsemen" on their album The Dark Side.
- In 2005, German dance group Scooter released a Techno version of "The Four Horsemen" called The Leading Horse on their album Who's Got The Last Laugh Now?.
- In 2015, the Greek band Cyanna Mercury (formerly known as Cyanna) covered "The Four Horsemen" on the Death Roots Syndicate compilation The End.
- "The Four Horsemen" has proven an especially popular cover among European heavy metal bands. Bands that have covered the song include the Italian band Death SS (on their 2006 album The 7th Seal), and the Greek black metal band Rotting Christ (on their 2016 album Rituals).
- In 2021 during the COVID-19 pandemic, Belgian drummer and singer Isolde Lasoen covered the song, not only because she thought it was "a terrific tune", but also because she could relate to it. "The four horsemen announce the apocalypse, because - among other things - a strange disease will sweep the world. It instantly made me think of the coronavirus and I always prefer to have a specific reason to release a song."

=== Samples ===
- The Verve's song "The Rolling People" (from their 1997 album Urban Hymns) borrows its title from "Altamont", while also containing musical elements of "The Four Horsemen". Frontman Richard Ashcroft reportedly mentioned 666 as a strong influence on his music.
- Beck's song "Chemtrails" (from his 2008 album Modern Guilt) also resembles "The Four Horsemen".
- Oneohtrix Point Never used a sample on his track "Untitled A7".
- Scooter used a sample in their song "The Leading Horse".
- Gregorian sampled it in their own "The Four Horsemen".
