= End of the World (album) =

Studio album by Aphrodite's Child
- Released: 6 November 1968
- Recorded: 10th, 18th, May; 26th – 29th June; 11th – 13th September; 2nd – 8th October 1968
- Genre: Psychedelic
- Length: 34:43
- Label: Philips

Aphrodite's Child chronology
End of the World (1968)	It's Five O'Clock (1969)

Singles from End of the World
- 1. "Rain and Tears" Released: 1968; 2. "End of the World" Released: 1969; 3. "Valley of Sadness" Released: 1969

Professional ratings
Review scores
Source	Rating
AllMusic	4/5 stars

End of the World is the debut studio album by Greek band Aphrodite's Child. It features the UK top 30 hit "Rain and Tears".

== Track listing ==
All songs written by Boris Bergman and Vangelis Papathanassiou except as noted

Side one
No.	Title	Writer(s)	Recorded	Length
1.	"End of the World"		22nd, 24th, 28th, 29th June; 11th, 12th, 13th September 1968	3:11
2.	"Don't Try to Catch a River"		10th, 18th May 1968	3:37
3.	"Mister Thomas"		2nd, 3rd, 4th, 7th, 8th October 1968	2:47
4.	"Rain and Tears"	Johann Pachelbel, Bergman, Vangelis	10th, 18th May 1968	3:12
5.	"The Grass is No Green"		22nd, 24th, 28th, 29th June; 11th, 12th, 13th September 1968	5:59

Side two
No.	Title	Writer(s)	Recorded	Length
1.	"Valley of Sadness"		22nd, 24th, 28th, 29th June; 11th, 12th, 13th September 1968	3:11
2.	"You Always Stand in My Way"		22nd, 24th, 28th, 29th June; 11th, 12th, 13th September 1968	3:53
3.	"The Shepherd and the Moon"		2nd, 3rd, 4th, 7th, 8th October 1968	3:00
4.	"Day of the Fool"		2nd, 3rd, 4th, 7th, 8th October 1968	5:51

== Personnel ==
- Vangelis - keyboards, piano, organ, clavichord, flutes, vibraphone, vocals
- Demis Roussos - lead vocals, bass, electric and acoustic guitars
- Loukas Sideras - drums, percussion, timpani, vocals

== Additional personnel ==
- Claude Chauvet: additional vocals (1, 4)
