= 666 (Aphrodite's Child album) =

1972 studio album by Aphrodite's Child

Studio album by Aphrodite's Child
- Released: June 1972
- Recorded: 1970–1971
- Studios: Studio Europa Sonor, Paris, France
- Genres: Progressive rock; psychedelic rock; art rock
- Length: 77:58 (international release); 82:44 (Greek release); 43:50 (Brazilian release)
- Label: Vertigo
- Producer: Vangelis Papathanassiou

Aphrodite's Child chronology
It's Five O'Clock (1969)	666 (1972)

Singles from 666
- 1. "Break" Released: 1972

666 (subtitled The Apocalypse of John, 13/18) is the third and final studio album and only double album by Greek progressive rock band Aphrodite's Child, released in June 1972 by Vertigo Records. An ambitious double-LP concept album, ostensibly an adaptation of Biblical passages from the Book of Revelation, 666 was composed by keyboardist Vangelis and lyricist Costas Ferris.

Conflict within the band and with their record company over the album's uncommercial style led to its release being delayed for more than a year. Though it was eventually released to a lukewarm critical and commercial reception, it later attracted a cult following among fans and musicians and became the group's most acclaimed project. It has appeared on various lists of the greatest progressive rock albums of all time.

== Conception and production ==
The concept for 666 was created by Vangelis and film director Costas Ferris, who served as the project's lyricist. Ferris cited as influences the nonlinear narrative style of the films Intolerance, Rashomon, Citizen Kane and The Killing, as well as the Beatles' Sgt. Pepper's Lonely Hearts Club Band and the Who's Tommy.

The central concept is a countercultural interpretation of the Book of Revelation, in which a circus show based on the apocalypse performs for an audience at the same time that the real apocalypse takes place outside the circus tent, and at the end the two merge into one. Ferris described the result as a "concept book", and stated that he intended for the narration to be looser than Tommy, but more rigid than Sgt. Pepper.

The band commenced work on the album at the Europa Sonor studio in Paris in late 1970. They took just over three months to record it and finished in early 1971. The overall cost of album's recording was estimated as US$80,000 (equivalent to $636,000 in 2025) or US$90,000 (equivalent to $715,000 in 2025). The recording was marked by tension, as the ambitious nature of Vangelis and Ferris' concept clashed with Demis Roussos, Loukas Sideras and Silver Koulouris' wish to continue with the psychedelic pop direction that had brought them success. Vangelis, Roussos and Sideras were also accompanied by their partners, further adding to the strain. Engineer Roger Roche reported that they enjoyed playing together but would not speak to each other after they finished a take. Vangelis blamed commercial pressures for the tensions, stating, "It was too sophisticated for the group. I realised that I couldn't follow the commercial way anymore, it was very boring."

Giorgio Gomelsky, in France at the time due to his work with Magma and Gong, made several contributions to the album and by his own description served as "a sort of 'acting producer'". He believed that his contributions were not enough to warrant a producer's credit. Accordingly, on the album sleeve, he is credited as "passing by". Gerard Fallec, credited on the sleeve with "production coordination", did not play a part in the production process, but became involved during the year-long battle to have the record released. Ferris credited him with suggesting the album's final title and working on its sleeve. Additional contributors to the album included Harris Halkitis, who had filled in for Vangelis when the band toured in support of It's Five O'Clock, horn player Michel Ripoche, Greek painter Yannis Tsarouchis, actress Irene Papas, John Forst and Daniel Koplowitz.

Upon the album's completion, Mercury Records refused to release it, objecting to its uncommercial material and in particular the song "∞". In 1971, the band organised a "one-year anniversary party" at Europa Sonor, to protest the album not being released. According to Ferris, Salvador Dalí was in attendance at the party, and listened to the album. Dalí was highly impressed with the work, stating that it reminded him of the Sagrada Família, and planned an ambitious happening in Barcelona to mark the album's release. The plan was canceled when Dalí angrily broke off further contact after a friend of Ferris' referred to Gala Dalí as "Madame Éluard" during a visit in Rome.

Despite Vangelis editing "∞" from its original 39 minutes to merely five, the band continued to struggle with Mercury's obstruction. During this period, the band drifted apart. Vangelis released his first solo album Fais que ton rêve soit plus long que la nuit. Sideras began work on his own solo album, One Day, which featured arrangements by Koulouris. Roussos released his debut solo album Fire and Ice (also known as On the Greek Side of My Mind), obtaining a hit single in Europe with the song "We Shall Dance".

== Songs ==
The music of 666 is more ambitious and experimental than previous Aphrodite's Child releases, containing greater use of electronic keyboards, studio experimentation, expanded instrumentation, and influences from genres such as jazz, musique concrète and world music. Reflecting this character, only six of the album's 24 songs have vocals and lyrics, four by lead singer Demis Roussos and two by Loukas Sideras. The rest are either instrumental, instrumentals with narration, or use vocals as an instrument. According to Classic Rock Magazine: "If Hell exists, half of this album is what it might sound like. The remainder is hypnotically engaging, nay, mind-blowing prog rock." Although the album's material is often acknowledged as challenging and uncommercial, it has also been described as tuneful, "fun", and retaining elements of pop music. Authors Paul Hegarty and Martin Halliwell interpreted the album as reflecting "the turmoil in Greece at the time", while Vangelis argued that its theme was highly relevant in general, stating in Sounds in 1974, "The answer to the question 666 is today." The Mojo Collection argues that "the album's lush arrangements were as startling as any of the progressive era and have aged better than most", in part due to Vangelis not relying excessively on contemporary synthesizers and the prominent role of guitarist Silver Koulouris.

=== Side one ===
The first song on the album, "The System", fades in with a choir chanting "We got the system, to fuck the system!" and a drum roll by Loukas Sideras. The lyric is inspired by Abbie Hoffman's pamphlet Fuck the System.

"Babylon" is an acoustic rock song with an energetic guitar riff that Head Heritage compared to Pete Townshend's work on "Pinball Wizard", melodic bass playing by Roussos, and crowd noise similar to that of Sgt. Pepper. The lyrics introduce the apocalyptic theme by referring to the fall of Babylon the Great from Revelation 18.

"Loud, Loud, Loud" combines a two-chord piano vamp by Vangelis with narration by Daniel Koplowitz, described by a fansite as "the son of [a] diplomat". The title is sung by a choir, who are not credited on the album sleeve. The narration reflects a spirit of countercultural optimism, speaking of "The day young boys will stop becoming soldiers/And soldiers will stop playing war games". The song was also sampled on the song "Mastermind" in Deltron 3030.

"The Four Horsemen" deals with the Four Horsemen of the Apocalypse, its lyrics mostly paraphrasing the text of Revelation 6. The song's structure is marked by a dynamic contrast, with Roussos singing over an echoed keyboard drone and wind chimes in the verses, and the chorus containing traditional rock instrumentation highlighted by Sideras' drumming. The song culminates in a two-minute wah guitar solo by Koulouris over heavy drumming by Sideras and a repeated "fa fa fa" background chant by Roussos. One of the best known songs of 666, "The Four Horsemen" influenced Beck's "Chemtrails", which has a similar structure, and The Verve's "The Rolling People", which quoted the "fa fa fa" chant. The chorus was also sampled, in a slowed-down fashion, on Daniel Lopatin's "A7", from Chuck Person's Eccojams Vol. 1.

"The Lamb" is a world music-influenced instrumental, featuring vocal chants following the main melody, and sounds reminiscent of traditional Greek instruments.

"The Seventh Seal" is an instrumental with a repeated keyboard and string instrument melody, and British-accented narration by John Forst describing the lamb opening the last of the Seven seals, again based on Revelation 6. The narration does not mention the earthquake that the Book of Revelation attributes to the breaking of the sixth seal, but is otherwise faithful to the biblical description. Forst's line, "And when the lamb opened the seventh seal, silence covered the sky" was sampled in the Enigma song, "The Rivers of Belief".

=== Side two ===
Side two begins with "Aegian Sea", an instrumental featuring another lengthy guitar solo by Koulouris, elaborate keyboard work by Vangelis, and wordless vocalising. Narration by John Forst is included under Koulouris' guitar solo, restating the breaking of the two seals in "The Seventh Seal" in singular first person, and featuring three repetitions of the phrase "They'll no more suffer from hunger, they'll no more suffer from thirst". Forst's narration is slowed down in pitch and panned to the right stereo channel, with echo being heard on the left channel.

"Aegian Sea" is followed by "Seven Bowls", a sound effect-laden piece in which a chorus narrates the effects of the seven bowls (changing the Euphrates drying up and earthquake of the last two bowls to the stars going out and the air turning to poison), which in turn crossfades into the eerie instrumental "The Wakening Beast", which uses reverbed wind chimes. The narration of "Seven Bowls" was sampled on the Enigma song "The Voice and the Snake".

"Lament" begins with a repeated vibraphone note played by Vangelis, followed by Roussos singing a lament for "the human race" over a minimal backing. Vangelis provides additional backing vocals, which reflect his interest in Byzantine music.

"The Marching Beast" is an instrumental piece with a repeated melody played on guitar, bass and saxophone, with a gradually developing arrangement that includes a piano solo and a Jethro Tull-influenced flute trill.

"The Battle of the Locusts" and "Do It" are aggressive rock instrumentals, variously perceived by reviewers as being influenced by jazz and heavy metal. Both begin with Forst reciting their titles, and are played in a power trio format, with intricate drumming and rapid guitar solos. The title of "Do It" comes from Jerry Rubin's book DO IT!: Scenarios of the Revolution. Both songs were compared by Head Heritage to "Ash Ra Tempel meets Santana".

"Tribulation" is a jazz-influenced instrumental with overdubbed saxophone by Harris Halkitis.

"The Beast" has been described as a "bizarre funky singalong". It is the first song with lead vocals by Loukas Sideras, who sings "Who can fight the beast?" in his normal voice and "She's big/She's bad/She's wicked/She's sad" in a deeper, lower voice. The song features a funk-influenced rhythm and studio experimentation, with the first snare hit of the verses having plate reverb applied to it. During recording, Vangelis had a microphone in order to direct the band, and the final mix of the song includes some of his rhythmic scat singing and studio commentary. He says Pame! ("Let's go!") near the song's climax, and Teliounome edho pera, etsi? ("We're closing here, remember?") on the song's final measure. Reviewer Jon Bryan considered the song "a little kooky" but "fun and memorable".

The last song on the second side, "Ofis", is a brief interlude in which Yiannis Tsarouchis recites a line from the shadow puppet play Alexander the Great and the Accursed Serpent with slapback echo applied to his voice. The line, Exelthe ofi katiramene, dhioti an dhen exelthe essy, tha se exelthe ego! Ou! Ou! Ou!, translates to "Come out, cursed serpent, because if you don't come out yourself, I will make you come out!".

=== Side three ===
"Seven Trumpets" is a dramatic narration that serves to introduce "Altamont". Head Heritage interpreted it to represent the moment where the "curtain of reality" is torn down, and thus the real apocalypse and the circus show apocalypse begin to intertwine as per Ferris' concept.

"Altamont", chosen as one of the highlights of the album by AllMusic, contains a repetitive funk-influenced groove, Roussos scatting along with the bassline, vibraphone by Vangelis, and overdubbed horns by Halkitis. The second half of the song introduces additional narration, referring to the imagery of previous songs and describing the sight of the apocalypse as "the pictures of what was, of what is, of what is to come". One of the lines of the narration, "We are the people/The rolling people", later inspired the title of The Verve's "The Rolling People".

"Altamont" ends by crossfading into "The Wedding of the Lamb", a world music-influenced instrumental that contains an electronic keyboard melody backed by wordless vocalising and syncopated, rhythmic drumming. The instrumental in turn crossfades into "The Capture of the Beast", a drum solo by Sideras that makes heavy use of toms and percussion instruments, performed over Vangelis' keyboard drones and effects. The songs are linked together by brief spoken lines recited in a halting manner which announce their titles, "That was 'The Wedding of the Lamb'" at the end of the former, and "Now comes 'The Capture of the Beast'" at the beginning of the latter.

"∞" ("Infinity"), the most controversial song on the album, consists of the Greek actress Irene Papas chanting "I was, I am, I am to come" over a sparse percussion track, gradually building into an orgasmic frenzy. Vangelis described the track as conveying "the pain of birth and the joy of intercourse." Ferris originally sought a narrator with a heavy British accent to recite the lyric, in order to create a contrast with the climactic frenzy, but Papas' improvisation was chosen instead because it made a stronger impression. Hegarty and Halliwell describe the song as part of the "increased cacophony" that marks the progression towards the apocalypse. Melody Maker remarked in 1972 that in light of the publicity received by Serge Gainsbourg's "Je t'aime... moi non plus", it was "odd" that the media overlooked 666, but that it would have been a "pity" if it achieved notoriety solely due to Papas' contribution. A sample of Papas taking sharp breaths was used in Enigma's "Principles of Lust".

"Hic et Nunc" (Latin for "here and now") is an upbeat pop song with phased piano, tenor saxophone by Michel Ripoche, a crowd chanting "Here and now!" in the chorus, a reuse of the audience sound effect from "Babylon" and the "We got the system to fuck the system" chant from "The System" during Vangelis' piano solo, foreshadowing the concluding "montage".

=== Side four ===
The longest song on the album, "All the Seats Were Occupied" begins as a slow raga-influenced instrumental before incorporating other genres such as funk and culminating in a musique concrète "montage" that incorporates samples from "Seven Trumpets", "The System", "Babylon", "The Four Horsemen", "Loud, Loud, Loud", "The Capture of the Beast", "Ofis", "∞", "Seven Bowls", "The Lamb", "The Wakening Beast", "The Marching Beast", "Altamont" and "The Wedding Of The Lamb". The sentence "all the seats were occupied" was taken from a BBC Teaching English record. The song concludes with a chaotic ending and a sample of Papas' pained groaning from "∞". This track was later included on the compilation album A Monstrous Psychedelic Bubble Exploding in Your Mind: Volume 3.

"Break", the closing song, is a ballad sung by Sideras, backed by piano and organ. Vangelis scat sings backing vocals, meant to make fun of the song's dramatic mood. Ferris' lyrics originally had an additional verse that began the song, starting "Now/Got no place to go", which was left out of the final version. Hegarty and Halliwell describe the last lines, "Fly/High/And then/You make it", as lacking in narrative link to the rest of the album, but ending on a "melancholic high". The song ends with a piano and organ chord, which is followed after 6 seconds of silence by a sample of Forst saying "Do it!", the final sound of the album.

== Packaging ==
The album's sleeve was created by production coordinator Gerard Fallec. Ferris stated that Fallec's initial idea was to have a black cover with "666" printed in white in the middle, inspired by the white background of The Beatles, and created the original design with three plastic car numbers. Ferris and Vangelis liked the idea but preferred a red background with the number printed white on black in the middle, similar to a vehicle registration plate. This became the final design, although several vinyl issues of the album use the original white number on black background sleeve.

Fallec also brought to the band a surreal, Dalí-influenced painting of a car crash that became the inner sleeve. Ferris stated that the band forgot to ask for the name of the artist (although the signature "M. Dubre" appears on the image), and that while Fallec was unsure about the relation of the painting to the work apart from the "car" theme of the cover, he and Vangelis considered it "the absolute representation of the stupidity of man."

The liner notes state "This album was recorded under the influence of Sahlep." Intended as a joke by the band, the statement provoked some controversy at the time of the album's release, as some groups interpreted it to mean that the album was drug-inspired, demonic, or blasphemous.

== Release and reception ==
Mercury released 666 on its progressive rock subsidiary Vertigo Records in June 1972. The album was promoted with one single, "Babylon"/"Break", released in November. Mercury also produced a four-song EP to encourage radio play, and ran a contest where they would give $666 to the first three promoters who could get their market's share of 40,000 sales. Although Melody Maker stated that "Break" "could easily have made the chart if it had been released as a single", neither the album nor single were commercially successful on release, the album failing to chart and the single only entering the Dutch charts at #24. Two years later, Vangelis said that the album sold well in the United States.

Vertigo also released a single vinyl edition of the album in Brazil, titled Break and leaving out most of the album's instrumental songs. An extended vinyl edition of 666 was released in Greece in 1974, containing alternative mixes of songs with music cut from other versions of the album, in a gatefold sleeve displaying the painting originally on the inner sleeve; some of these versions had appeared on the Brazilian release.

Professional ratings
Review scores
Source	Rating
AllMusic	4.5/5 stars
Backseat Mafia	6.4/10
Billboard	4/5 stars
The Encyclopedia of Popular Music	3/5 stars
MetalReviews	87/100
Mojo	(favorable)
The Rolling Stone Record Guide	1/5 stars
Sputnikmusic	5/5

The Rolling Stone Record Guide dismissed 666 as "pompous and pointless". Colin Larkin's Encyclopedia of Popular Music states that "the album was applauded for its ambition and execution", but it did not attract many contemporary reviews. AllMusic gives it 4½ stars, but notes that "the entire set eventually becomes too overwhelming to sit through".

IGN ranked the album number 3 on their list of Top 25 Prog Rock Albums. In the Q & Mojo Classic Special Edition ‘’Pink Floyd & the Story of Prog Rock’’, the album came number 40 in its list of "40 Cosmic Rock Albums".

A re-issued version of the album – including a previously unavailable French (English-subtitled) interview with Vangelis on the creative process, alongside widely-unheard Greek mixes, a Dolby ATMOS up-mix, illustrated booklet and further original interviews – was released on 8 November 2024.

== Track listing ==
Although Ferris has been identified as the lyricist, the album explicitly states that all tracks — even the instrumentals — are composed by Vangelis Papathanassiou and Costas Ferris.

=== Worldwide vinyl release ===
Side one
No.	Title	Length
1.	"The System"	0:23
2.	"Babylon"	2:47
3.	"Loud, Loud, Loud"	2:42
4.	"The Four Horsemen"	5:53
5.	"The Lamb"	4:34
6.	"The Seventh Seal"	1:30

Side two
No.	Title	Length
1.	"Aegian Sea"	5:22
2.	"Seven Bowls"	1:28
3.	"The Wakening Beast"	1:11
4.	"Lament"	2:45
5.	"The Marching Beast"	2:00
6.	"The Battle of the Locusts"	0:56
7.	"Do It"	1:44
8.	"Tribulation"	0:32
9.	"The Beast"	2:26
10.	"Ofis"	0:14

Side three
No.	Title	Length
1.	"Seven Trumpets"	0:35
2.	"Altamont"	4:33
3.	"The Wedding of the Lamb"	3:38
4.	"The Capture of the Beast"	2:17
5.	"∞"	5:15
6.	"Hic et Nunc"	2:55

Side four
No.	Title	Length
1.	"All the Seats Were Occupied"	19:21
2.	"Break"	2:59

=== Brazilian vinyl release (released as Break) ===
Side one
No.	Title	Length
1.	"Babylon"	2:52
2.	"The Four Horsemen"	6:10
3.	"The Lamb"	4:40
4.	"Aegian Sea"	5:22
5.	"The Beast"	2:26

Side two
No.	Title	Length
1.	"All the Seats were Occupied"	19:21
2.	"Break"	2:59

=== Greek vinyl release ===
Side one
No.	Title	Length
1.	"The System"	0:25
2.	"Babylon"	2:57
3.	"Loud, Loud, Loud"	2:43
4.	"The Four Horsemen"	6:10
5.	"The Lamb"	4:36
6.	"The Seventh Seal"	1:30

Side two
No.	Title	Length
1.	"Aegian Sea"	5:22
2.	"Seven Bowls"	1:28
3.	"The Wakening Beast"	1:11
4.	"Lament"	2:45
5.	"The Marching Beast"	2:00
6.	"The Battle of the Locusts"	1:41
7.	"Do It"	1:44
8.	"Tribulation"	0:32
9.	"The Beast"	2:26
10.	"Ofis"	0:14

Side three
No.	Title	Length
1.	"Seven Trumpets"	0:36
2.	"Altamont"	5:29
3.	"The Wedding of the Lamb"	4:15
4.	"The Capture of the Beast"	2:17
5.	"∞"	5:15
6.	"Hic et Nunc"	4:37

Side four
No.	Title	Length
1.	"All the Seats Were Occupied"	19:21
2.	"Break"	2:56

=== CD release ===
Disc one
No.	Title	Length
1.	"The System"	0:23
2.	"Babylon"	2:47
3.	"Loud, Loud, Loud"	2:42
4.	"The Four Horsemen"	5:54
5.	"The Lamb"	4:33
6.	"The Seventh Seal"	1:30
7.	"Aegian Sea"	5:22
8.	"Seven Bowls"	1:29
9.	"The Wakening Beast"	1:11
10.	"Lament"	2:45
11.	"The Marching Beast"	2:00
12.	"The Battle of the Locusts"	0:56
13.	"Do It"	1:44
14.	"Tribulation"	0:32
15.	"The Beast"	2:26
16.	"Ofis"	0:14
Total length:		36:28

Disc two
No.	Title	Length
1.	"Seven Trumpets"	0:35
2.	"Altamont"	4:33
3.	"The Wedding of the Lamb"	3:38
4.	"The Capture of the Beast"	2:17
5.	"∞"	5:15
6.	"Hic et Nunc"	2:55
7.	"All the Seats were Occupied"	19:19
8.	"Break"	2:58
Total length:		41:30

== Personnel ==
Aphrodite's Child

- Vangelis Papathanassiou (Evangelos Odysseas Papathanassiou) – keyboards, organ, piano, vibraphone, bass, flute, percussion, backing vocals on "Lament", "The Beast", "Break"
- Demis Roussos (Artemios Ventouris Roussos) – lead vocals on "Babylon", "The Four Horsemen", "Lament", "Hic et Nunc", bass, guitar, trumpet, backing vocals
- Loukas Sideras – drums, lead vocals on "The Beast", "Break", backing vocals
- Silver Koulouris (Anargyros Koulouris) – guitar, percussion

Additional musicians

- Harris Halkitis – bass, tenor saxophone, congas, percussion, backing vocals
- Michel Ripoche – trombone, tenor saxophone on "Babylon", "Hic et Nunc"
- Irene Papas – vocals on "∞"
- John Forst – narration on "The Seventh Seal", "Aegian Sea", "The Battle of the Locusts", "Do It", "Seven Trumpets", "Altamont", "The Wedding of the Lamb", "The Capture of the Beast"
- Yannis Tsarouchis – Greek narration on "Ofis"
- Daniel Koplowitz – narration on "Loud, Loud, Loud"

Production

- Vangelis – producer
- Roger Roche – engineer
- Jean-Claude Conan – assistant engineer
- Hitoshi Takiguchi – mastering engineer
- Gilbert Kong – mastering (original US LP)
- Hans Brethouwer – mastering (1989 European CD reissue)
- Hitoshi Takiguchi – mastering (2004/2014 Japanese CD reissues)
- Gerard Fallec – production coordination, sleeve design
- Giorgio Gomelsky – "passing by" (production assistance)
- Minoru Harada – product manager
- Kiyoshi Tokiwa – art coordinator
- Michel Dubré – inner sleeve painting

== Charts ==
Chart performance for 666
Chart (2024)	Peak position
Belgian Albums (Ultratop Flanders)	108
German Albums (Offizielle Top 100)	42
Greek Albums (IFPI)	2
