= 5 P.M. =

5 P.M. or variants may refer to:

- A time on the 12-hour clock
- 5 PM (film), a 2017 Iranian comedy film
- "5:00 P.M." (The Pitt season 1), episode 11 from season 1 of The Pitt
- "5:00 P.M." (The Pitt season 2), episode 11 from season 2 of The Pitt

== See also ==
- 5 o'clock (disambiguation)
