= Silver Koulouris =

Greek musician (born 1947)

- Birth name: Anargyros Koulouris
- Also known as: Silver Koulouris
- Born: 26 January 1947 (age 78) Piraeus, Greece
- Genres: progressive rock
- Instrument: Guitar
- Formerly of: Aphrodite's Child

Anargyros "Argyris" Koulouris (Greek: Ανάργυρος "Αργύρης" Κουλούρης; born 26 January 1947), known as Silver Koulouris, is a Greek musician best known for his membership in the band Aphrodite's Child, in which he played lead guitar. He has also performed session work on a plethora of albums by other artists, including those of his former Aphrodite's Child bandmates, throughout the 1970s and 1980s, and in recent decades he has released solo recordings under his own name.

== Early life and musical beginnings ==
Born in Piraeus, Greece, Koulouris acquired the nickname "Silver" due to his birth name's similarity to the Greek word for the element silver. In converting his given name from the Greek alphabet, many different spellings of his name have emerged, such as Anargyros, Argyris, Argiris, Anarchyris, Anachyros, and Agyrilos.

In his late teenage years, Koulouris met Demis Roussos, who played bass guitar, and Lucas Sideras, a drummer, with whom he went on to play guitar in a band called The Idols in and around Athens, Greece. Because he was in the Greek Army at the time, Koulouris was able to play with The Idols only occasionally, but he maintained a connection with Roussos and Sideras that would prove to be key to his future musical career.

== With Aphrodite's Child ==
In 1966, Roussos and Sideras met keyboardist and composer Vangelis Papathanassiou, and in 1968, the three decided to form a band, inviting Koulouris to join as their guitarist. That same year, the foursome recorded one single, "Plastics Nevermore" b/w "The Other People," under the name Aphrodite's Child. As the band prepared to travel to England to find greater success, Koulouris' military obligations once again impeded his musical career, and he had to stay in Greece while the remaining three established Aphrodite's Child further west.

By 1970, Koulouris was out of the military and free to rejoin the band. He provided lead guitar and assorted percussion on the group's third LP, 666. Due to conflict within the band and tensions with their record label, Aphrodite's Child had broken up by the time the album was released, so Koulouris was left to find a new musical direction for himself.

== Collaborations and session work ==
Following Aphrodite's Child's demise, Koulouris became a session musician for his former bandmates as they embarked on solo careers. He co-wrote tracks and played bass, rhythm, and lead guitars as well as additional percussion on Sideras' debut LP, One Day; he co-wrote songs and played bass, lead guitar, and laouto on Roussos' debut album, Fire and Ice (also known as On the Greek Side of My Mind); and on Vangelis' 1973 album Earth, Koulouris provided guitar, lute, and backing vocals.

Koulouris did session work on additional solo albums by Roussos and Vangelis and also played for fellow Greek musician Harris Chalkitis, who had assisted in the completion of 666. In 1975, Koulouris worked with Vangelis in a band-like setting once again, along with Michael Haubrich and F.R. David, and together they released one single, "Bird of Love" b/w "The Pawn," under the name Humanity (sometimes spelled Umanity).

After further session work for various artists, Koulouris collaborated with Magic Power, an electronic funk band, on two LPs and a single: Lady Midnight in 1979, "A Lot to Learn" b/w "The Waiting Game" in 1980 (Koulouris appeared on the original single cover sleeve), and the group's self-titled second album, also in 1980. Most of his contribution to the Magic Power sound was through rhythm guitar.

== Solo works ==
In 1997, Koulouris finally released an album of his own, titled Αργιριδιαδρομές (which transliterates to English as "Argiridiadromes"). In addition, he issued another solo album, City Lights, in early 2015.
