= 5 o'clock =

5 o'clock or five o'clock may refer to:

- "5 O'Clock" (T-Pain song), 2011 R&B/hip-hop song by T-Pain
- "5 O'Clock" (Nonchalant song), 1996 hip-hop song by Nonchalant
- 5th hour of a clock, see 12-hour clock
- The end of a 9-to-5 workday, see Working time
- The 5 O'Clock Show, 2010 UK Channel 4 TV talk show
- Richard Hammond's 5 O'Clock Show, 2006 UK ITV TV talk show
- It's Five O'Clock, 1969 album by Aphrodite's Child
  - "It's Five O'Clock" (song), a song by Aphrodite's Child from the 1969 album It's Five O'Clock
- It's Five O'Clock Somewhere, 2003 country song by Alan Jackson and Jimmy Buffett

== See also ==
- 5 o'clock shadow
- 5 o'clock wave
- 5 A.M. (disambiguation)
