= List of number-one hits of 1970 (Italy) =

This is a list of the number-one hits of 1970 on Italian Hit Parade Singles Chart.

Issue date	Song	Artist
January 3	"Belinda"	Gianni Morandi
January 10	"Mi ritorni in mente"	Lucio Battisti
January 17	"Mi ritorni in mente"	Lucio Battisti
January 24	"Ma chi se ne importa"	Gianni Morandi
January 31	"Ma chi se ne importa"	Gianni Morandi
February 7	"Ma chi se ne importa"	Gianni Morandi
February 14	"Ma chi se ne importa"	Gianni Morandi
February 21	"Ma chi se ne importa"	Gianni Morandi
February 28	"Venus"	Shocking Blue
March 7	"Venus"	Shocking Blue
March 14	"Chi non lavora non fa l'amore"	Adriano Celentano
March 21	"Chi non lavora non fa l'amore"	Adriano Celentano
March 28	"La prima cosa bella"	Nicola Di Bari
April 4	"La prima cosa bella"	Nicola Di Bari
April 11	"La prima cosa bella"	Nicola Di Bari
April 18	"La prima cosa bella"	Nicola Di Bari
April 25	"La prima cosa bella"	Nicola Di Bari
May 2	"La prima cosa bella"	Nicola Di Bari
May 9	"La prima cosa bella"	Nicola Di Bari
May 16	"La prima cosa bella"	Nicola Di Bari
May 23	"Let It Be"	The Beatles
May 30	"It's Five O'Clock"	Aphrodite's Child
June 6	"It's Five O'Clock"	Aphrodite's Child
June 13	"It's Five O'Clock"	Aphrodite's Child
June 20	"It's Five O'Clock"	Aphrodite's Child
June 27	"It's Five O'Clock"	Aphrodite's Child
July 4	"Lady Barbara"	Renato
July 11	"Lady Barbara"	Renato
July 18	"Lady Barbara"	Renato
July 25	"Lady Barbara"	Renato
August 1	"La lontananza"	Domenico Modugno
August 8	"La lontananza"	Domenico Modugno
August 15	"La lontananza"	Domenico Modugno
August 22	"La lontananza"	Domenico Modugno
August 29	"La lontananza"	Domenico Modugno
September 5	"La lontananza"	Domenico Modugno
September 12	"La lontananza"	Domenico Modugno
September 19	"La lontananza"	Domenico Modugno
September 26	"In The Summertime"	Mungo Jerry
October 3	"Sympathy"	Rare Bird
October 10	"In the Summertime"	Mungo Jerry
October 17	"In the Summertime"	Mungo Jerry
October 24	"In the Summertime"	Mungo Jerry
October 31	"In the Summertime"	Mungo Jerry
November 7	"In the Summertime"	Mungo Jerry
November 3	"Prisencolinensinainciusol" #1 TOP HIT	Adriano Celentano
November 21	"Prisencolinensinainciusol" #1 TOP HIT	Adriano Celentano
November 28	"Anna"	Lucio Battisti
December 5	"Anna"	Lucio Battisti
December 12	"Anna"	Lucio Battisti
December 19	"Anna"	Lucio Battisti
December 26	"Anna"	Lucio Battisti

== Number-one artists ==
Position	Artist	Weeks #1
1	Domenico Modugno	8
1	Nicola Di Bari	8
2	Aphrodite's Child	7
2	Lucio Battisti	7
3	Gianni Morandi	6
3	Mungo Jerry	6
4	Renato	4
5	Adriano Celentano	2
5	Shocking Blue	2
6	The Beatles	1
6	Rare Bird	1

== See also ==
- 1970 in music
