= Marika Ninou =

Marika Ninou Μαρίκα Νίνου
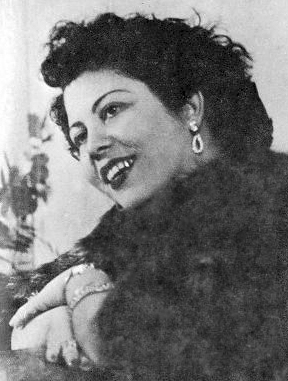

Background information
- Born: Evangelia Atamian before 23 February 1922; Aegean Sea, Greece
- Died: 23 February 1957 (aged 35) Greece
- Genres: Rebetiko
- Occupation: Singer
- Years active: mid-1940s–1957

Marika Ninou (Greek: Μαρίκα Νίνου; born Evangelia Atamian (Ευαγγελία Αταμιάν); 1922 – 23 February 1957) was an Armenian-Greek rebetiko singer.

== Biography ==
She was born in 1922 aboard the ship Evangelistria, which brought her mother, two sisters, and eight-year-old brother, Barkev Atamian, from Smyrna (present-day İzmir) to Piraeus. Because she was thought unlikely to survive at birth, she was taken to a warehouse after delivery. However, she survived, and the captain of the Evangelistria immediately baptized her, giving her the name Evangelia, meaning “she of the Gospel” or “bearer of good news” in Greek.

In Greece, her family settled in Kokkinia, at 50 Megara Street. At the age of seven, Ninou started attending the Armenian School of Blue Cross of Greece "Zavarian" in Kokkinia.

There she learned to play the mandolin and joined the school orchestra. Because of her vocal abilities, she also sang at the Armenian Church of St. Hagop in Kokkinia.

In 1939, she married her first husband Haig Mesrobian, who was a locksmith and had a shop in Kokkinia, and in 1940 gave birth to their son Ovanes. In 1947, Soviet ships came to Greece to take the Armenians who would want to leave and go to Armenia. Half the Armenian population of Thessaloniki and Athens left. Among them was Ninou's husband, Haig, who left his wife and son behind.

She met the acrobat Nikos Nikolaides "Nino" in 1944 and married him. They began to perform together as "The Duo Nino". When her son joined the act, they became "the Two-and-a-half Nino".

In a performance of the Ninos, the artist Petros Kyriakos heard her singing and recommended her to Manolis Chiotis. Chiotis recorded two songs with her in 1948.

In October 1948 Stelakis Perpiniadis (Greek: Στελλάκης Περπινιάδης) brought her under his wing as a singer at the Florida club.

By 1949, Ninou had begun working with Vassilis Tsitsanis at Fat Jimmy's, a venue that later played an important role in both of their careers, and the Tsitsanis–Ninou partnership became significant in the history of Greek music.

In October 1951 Ninou performed with Tsitsanis in Istanbul, but after this trip, they decided to go their separate ways.

Before heading off to the United States in 1954, she underwent a cancer operation in Athens. Nonetheless, her cancer spread rapidly in the US and she returned to Greece where she worked under great pain for a short while before succumbing to her illness at 35 years of age.

== Legacy ==
Ninou possessed a high-pitched voice of substantial body and volume and impeccable tonality, and sang with emotional intensity. She recorded a total of 174 songs, of which 119 as lead singer.

The movie Rembetiko by Costas Ferris is based on her life.
