= Skipp =

Skipp is a surname and given name. Notable people with this name include:

== Surname ==
- Colin Skipp (1939–2019), British actor
- John Skipp (born 1957), author
- Oliver Skipp (born 2000), English football player
- Victor Skipp (1925–2010), English local historian, art collector and amateur philosopher

== Given name ==
- Robert "Skipp" Orr, also known as Robert Orr (executive) (born 1953)
- Skipp Sudduth (born 1956), American theater, film and television actor
- Skipp Townsend, American gang expert
- Skipp Whitman, American hip-hop artist
- Skipp Williamson, Australian businesswoman
