= List of songs recorded by Milva =

This is a partial alphabetical list of all the songs known to have been recorded and/or performed by, or featuring Milva, between 1959 and 2012. Over 1200 of her songs are listed below, organised by language and listed in chronological order of recording, performance, and/or release.

== A ==
- "25 aprile 1945" (1975)
- "25 aprile 1945" (2nd version)
- "A cosa pensi?" (1982)
- "A media luz" (Guardando intorno a te) (1968)
- "A tradimento" ("Silence in the Dark") (1986)
- "Abat jour" ("Salome") (1962)
- "Addio" (2011)
- "Addio, Lugano bella" (1965)
- "Adieu, adieu!" (1994)
- "Adiós, caballero" (1969)
- "Adiós, muchachos" (1968)
- "Adiós, pampa mía" (1968)
- "Al bar del porto" (1985)
- "Al di là" (1961)
- "Al di là" (2nd version)
- "Albergo a ore" ("Les amants d'un jour") (1970)
- "Alexander Platz" (1982)
- "All'Osteria" ("El Choclo") (1969)
- "Allodole" (2011)
- "Allo specchio" (1977)
- "Amiche" ("Amigo") (duet with Cristiano Malgioglio)
- "Amo chi siamo" (1985)
- "Amore senza amore" (1961)
- "Amore tenero" (1969)
- "Anche la fine" (1961)
- "Angelo del rock" (duet with Franco Battiato) (in Italian and English) (1989)
- "Anna non piangere" (1998)
- "Aranjuez" ("Concierto de Aranjuez") (1994)
- "Aria" (2001)
- "Aria di festa (Come quel giorno)" (1964)
- "Aria di festa (Come quel giorno)" (2nd version)
- "Arlecchino gitano" (1960)
- "Aspettando l'alba" (1999)
- "Atmosfera" (1989)
- "Aveva un cuore grande" (1969)

== B ==
- "Ballata del fiume" (1961)
- "Ballata della donna del soldato nazista" (1971)
- "Ballata della schiavitù sessuale" (1971)
- "Ballata di Maria Sanders" (1971)
- "Ballata per una ragazza annegata" (1971)
- "Balocchi e profumi" (1963)
- "Balocchi e profumi" (Extended version) (1963)
- "Balocchi e profumi" (live) (1963) (limited release)
- "Bandoneon arraballero (Il cantastorie col bandoneon)" (1968)
- "Barbara song" (1971)
- "Bella ciao" (1965)
- "Bella ciao" (Canto dei Partigiani) (1965)
- "Bella ciao" (Tarantella Version) (1965)
- "Bella ciao" (Canto delle Mondine) (1965)
- "Bella ciao" (live) (1967)
- "Bella ciao" (live) (1970)
- "Bella la vita" (1969)
- "Bello bello bellissimo" (1969)
- "Bilbao-Song" (1996)
- "Bist Du bei Mir" (in Italian and German) (2010)
- "Blue notte" ("Search for the Truth") (1986)
- "Blue notte" ("Search for the Truth") (Maxi Version) (1986)
- "Blue spanish eyes" (Occhi spagnoli) (1966)
- "Blue tango" (Il diario sa) (1968)
- "Bye bye bye" (1999)

== C ==
- "Caffè nero bollente" (1994)
- "Cambio d'identità" (2007)
- "Campione" (1999)
- "Cantare e vai" (1983)
- "Canto a Lloret" ("Tomorrow and Tomorrow and Tomorrow") (1986)
- "Canto a Lloret" ("Tomorrow and Tomorrow and Tomorrow") (Extended Version) (1986)
- "Canto di libertà" (1998)
- "Canzone" (1968)
- "Canzone" (live) (1968)
- "Canzone" (live) (1970)
- "Canzone" (live) (1998) (limited release)
- "Canzone dell' uomo infedele" (2004)
- "Canzone della donna che voleva esser marinaio" (2007)
- "Canzone della libertà" (1972)
- "Capitani coraggiosi" (1983)
- "Cara Biondina" (1969)
- "Caro John" ("Johnny tu n'es pas un ange") (1970)
- "Caruso" (1998)
- "Caruso" (live) (1998) (limited release)
- "Cavalli bradi (1993)
- "Centro di gravità permanente" (duet with Franco Battiato) (1989)
- "Che famiglia" (1969)
- "Che mai farò" (1961)
- "Chi mai" (1972)
- "Chi sei" (1998)
- "Chi vorrà incontrar l'amore" (1963)
- "Chissà se è vero" (1980)
- "Chiudi gli occhi e sogna" (1962)
- "Ci vorrebbe il mare" (1993)
- "Cielo azzurro (Stanotte sognerò)" (1968)
- "Cielo dei bar" (1962)
- "Cielo e terra" (1961)
- "Cleo dalle cinque alle sette" (1963)
- "Cleo dalle cinque alle sette" (live) (1963)
- "Come ci vedono loro" (1968)
- "Come puoi lasciarmi" (1965)
- "Come sempre" (1963)
- "Come spiegarti" ("To Treno Fevgi Stis Okto") (1979)
- "Con le mani sugli occhi" (1961)
- "Concerto a Granada" (1964)
- "Contro la seduzione" (1975)
- "Corale" (1992)
- "Credere" (1961)
- "Creola" (1963)
- "Creola" (live) (1992)
- "Crudele tango" (duet with W. Romano) (1960)
- "Cuando salí de Cuba (Quando una stella cade)" (1967)
- "Cuando salí de Cuba (Quando una stella cade)" (with Los Paraguayos) (1969)
- "Cuori di passaggio" ("Thursday Morning") (1986)
- "Cuori solitari" (1985)

== D ==
- "Da solo a sola" (1960)
- "Da troppo tempo" (1973)
- "Da troppo tempo" (live) (1998)
- "D'amore si muore" (1972)
- "De carissimo" (1985)
- "Delirio" (1961)
- "Desiderato sogno" ("Spanish Dream") (1986)
- "Devi decidere" (1965)
- "Dicono di me" (1983)
- "Diego Cao" (1969)
- "Die Moritat von Mackie Messer" (live) (1992)
- "Dio che paura dell'amore" ("Mes Ton Kambo") (1979)
- "Dio, uno di noi" (1972)
- "Dipingi un mondo per me" (1967)
- "Domenica, Domenica" (1974)
- "Due croci" (1959)
- "Duo di varietà" (1994)

== E ==
- "È amore anche" (1969)
- "È amore quando" (1969)
- "...È brava Parigi" (1994)
- "Edipo" (1977)
- "È già finita" (1974)
- "E io ho visto un uomo" (1980)
- "È l'amore che fa amare" (1970)
- "È l'ora" (1973)
- "È per colpa tua" (1972)
- "È tardi" (2011)
- "E ti amo veramente" (1990)
- "Eclisse di sole" (1961)
- "El choclo (All'osteria)" (1968)
- "El colombo venezian" (1960)
- "Esmeralda" (duet with Gino Bramieri) (1969)
- "Estate" (1960)
- "Eva dagli occhi di gatto" (1983)
- "Eva dagli occhi di gatto" (live) (1988)
- "Exodus" (1961)
- "Exodus" (extended version) (1961)

== F ==
- "Fammi luce" (with Shinji Tanimura) (1999)
- "Fantasia" (1983)
- "Ferita" (1962)
- "Finale" (duet with Gino Bramieri) (1969)
- "Finale" (2011)
- "Fine settimana" ("Doxa To Theo") (1979)
- "Finestra chiusa" (1963)
- "Fischia il vento" (1965)
- "Flamenco rock" (1960)
- "Forse chissà" ("I'll Find My Way Home") (1983)
- "Forse son pazza" (1960)
- "Forse ti amo" (1965)
- "Fotografe" (2011)
- "Fumo e odore di caffè" (1994)

== G ==
- "Gastone" (1963)
- "Gente (Stelle capavolte)" (1988)
- "Giovane amore" (1967)
- "Gli inguini" (2004)
- "Gli occhi del tempo" (live) (1998)
- "Gli scacchi" (2011)
- "Goody goody" (1963)
- "Gringo" (1961)
- "Guarda che luna" (1962)
- "Guarda che notte" (1998)

== I ==
- "I giorni della monotonia" (2010)
- "I mendicanti" (Duet with Renato Dibi) (2004)
- "I processi del pensiero" (1989 version) (1989)
- "I processi del pensiero" (2010 version) (2010)
- "I sandali" (2004)
- "I suoi vent'anni" ("O Ageras Lei Mia Prosefhi") (1979)
- "I tetti rossi di casa mia" (1973)
- "Il ballo del potere" (2010)
- "Il cantastorie... (Bandoleon Arrabalero)" (1968)
- "Il canto di un' eneide diversa" (1998)
- "Il cielo ha capito" (1962)
- "Il cosacco"
- "Il cuore stranamente" (1999)
- "Il diario sa" (1968)
- "Il Dottor Frisch" (2011)
- "Il dritto" (1980)
- "Il film della mia vita" (1985)
- "Il filo strappato" (1996)
- "Il giorno giusto" (1999)
- "Il giovane Hans" (2011)
- "Il maestro... quello che" (2011)
- "Il mare nel cassetto" (1961)
- "Il mio Norman" (1963)
- "Il mondo" (live) (1967)
- "Il mondo in tasca" (1969)
- "Il nostro amore" (1963)
- "Il pesciolino" (1965)
- "Il primo mattino del mondo" (1961)
- "Il primo mattino del mondo" (extended version) (1961)
- "Il racconto della ascesa e caduta della città di Mahagonny" (1975)
- "Il silenzio" (1982)
- "Il sole tra le braccia" (1963)
- "Il tango delle capinere" (1963)
- "Immagini del tempo" (1972)
- "In sogno" ("Finale") (1986)
- "Incendio" (1963)
- "Inno a Oberdan" (1965)
- "Inno all' amore" ("Hymne à l'amour") (1970)
- "Invano" (1962)
- "Inventario romantico" (1983)
- "Io amo, tu ami" (1961)
- "Io che non vivo" ("You Don't Have to Say You Love Me") (live) (1967)
- "Io che non vivo" ("You Don't Have to Say You Love Me") (live) (1970)
- "Io chi sono?" (2010)
- "Io di notte" (1967 version) (1967)
- "Io lo farei" (1970)
- "Io non so cos'è" (1967)
- "Io non ti amo" (1963)
- "Io per amore" ("Love Is a Feeling") (1967) (limited release)
- "Io sono l'amore" (1960)
- "Io sono sempre io" (1973)
- "Io vivo" (1960)
- "Iptissam" (1970)
- "Islas canarias" (1961)

== J ==
- "Jacop Apfelböck o il Giglio dei Campi" (1996)
- "Jacques" (2007)
- "Jenny dei pirati" (1971)
- "John Brown" (1965)
- "Johnny" (1965)
- "Johnny" (live) (1978)
- "Johnny" (live) (1992)
- "Johnny guitar" (2004)
- "Johnny guitar" (with Alda Merini) (live) (2007)
- "Juana (disco tris)" (1969)

== L ==
- "La ballata dell' agiatezza" (live) (2008)
- "La ballata della vivificante potenza del denaro" (1996)
- "La ballata di chi vuol stare bene al mondo" (1996)
- "La ballata di Hanna Cash" (1996)
- "La ballata di Lilly all'inferno" (1996)
- "La ballata di Maria Sanders" (1996)
- "La ballata di Maria Sanders" (live) (1971)
- "La califfa" (1972)
- "La canzone dei marinai" (1996)
- "La canzone dei pendagli da forca" (1996)
- "La canzone del bene stare al mondo" (1975)
- "La canzone della libertà" (1972)
- "La canzone della moldavia" (1975)
- "La canzone della Moldawa" (1975)
- "La canzone di una ragazza di piacere" (1996)
- "La Carmagnole"
- "La casa al mare" ("Se Dromous Makrinous") (1979)
- "La città si frantuma" (2011)
- "La cumparsita (Questo tango)" (1968)
- "La danza di Zorba" ("Zorbas") (1998)
- "La diva dell' empire" (1965)
- "La donna del buono a nulla" ("Duelo criollo") (1968)
- "La Filanda" ("È ou nau è") (1971)
- "La folla" (1970)
- "La java rossa" (1965)
- "La leggenda" (2011)
- "La leggenda del soldato morto" (1975)
- "La lettera" ("Karadi") (1998)
- "La luna" (1968)
- "La lunga notte" (1998)
- "La mia età" (1979)
- "La mia felicità" ("Hassapico Nostalgique") (1960)
- "La mia vita cambierà" ("Inspiración") (1968)
- "La mosca bianca" (2007)
- "La nostra storia d'amore" (1971)
- "La notte del miracoli" (1993)
- "La notte dell' addio" (1985)
- "La passione secondo Milva" (1982)
- "La pianura" (1971)
- "La piramide di Cheope" (1989)
- "La ragazza del fiume" (1962)
- "La risposta della novia" (1962)
- "La rossa" (1980)
- "La scacchiera di pezza" (2011)
- "La segretaria ha colpito ancora (Ivan Cattaneo)" (1977)
- "La tua stagione" (1962)
- "La verde età" (1962)
- "La vita è rosa" ("La vie en rose") (1970)
- "Ladra" (1963)
- "Lady luna" (1961)
- "L'aeroplano (Lucy in the Sky with Diamonds)" (in Italian and English) (1982)
- "L'albatros" (2004)
- "L'amore che fa amare" (1961)
- "L'amore per l'amore" (1961)
- "Lettera a Cocò" (1977)
- "Le aquile" (2010)
- "Le donne" (1982)
- "Le itam" (1999)
- "Le ombre del giardino" (1993)
- "Le osterie" (live) (2005)
- "Le rififi" (1958)
- "Le rose rosse" (1963 version) (1963)
- "Le rose rosse" (1978 version) (1978)
- "Le rose rosse" (live) (1992)
- "Le stagioni dell' amore" (1967)
- "Le torte" (1978)
- "Le tue mani" (1969)
- "Le vittime del cuore" (1989)
- "Liebelei" (1961)
- "L'immensità" (1969)
- "L'immensità" (live) (1998) (limited release)
- "Little Man" (Piccolo ragazzo) (1966)
- "Lontano lontano" (1993)
- "Lord's Prayer" (1963)
- "Love story" (1973)
- "Lucciole vagabonde" (1963)
- "Luce" (1974)
- "Lui" (1985)
- "L'ultima Carmen" (1986)
- "L'ultimo tram (a mezzanotte)" (1964)
- "Lungo la strada" ("Polyushka Polye") (1965 version) (1965)
- "Lungo la strada" ("Polyushka Polye") (1976 version) (1976)
- "L'unica ragione" (1963)
- "L'uomo dal mantello rosso" (1974)
- "L'uomo questo mascalzone" (1974)

== M ==
- "Malinconia" (1963)
- "Malinconia" (live) (1963)
- "M'ama non m'ama" (1968)
- "Mamaluk" (1963)
- "Mamaluk" (live) (1963)
- "Mamma" (1998)
- "Mandelay-Song" (1996)
- "Mare scuro" (1961)
- "Mare verde" (1961)
- "Matchiche" (1965)
- "Mediterraneo" (1972)
- "Memento" (from "Opera Poetica") (1976)
- "Medley: Motherless Child & Non arrenderti, uomo" (duet with Mina accompanied by I Folkstudio Gospel) (live) (in English and Italian) (1972)
- "Merci Paris" (1963)
- "Metti una sera a cena" ("Nosso mar") (1972)
- "Mia madre si chiama Francesca" (1972)
- "Milord" (1960 version)
- "Milord" (1970 version)
- "Milord" (1970 version) (live)
- "Milord" (in Italian and French) (live) (1998) (limited release)
- "Miniera" (1963)
- "Mio fratello non trova lavoro" (2007)
- "Mi pare un sogno" (from "Al cavallino bianco") (1965)
- "Mon amour" (1993)
- "Mon Dieu" (1961 version)
- "Mon Dieu" (1970 version)
- "Mon Dieu" (live) (1970)
- "Mon homme" (1961)
- "Monica delle bambole" (1974)
- "Morire d'amore" (with Shinji Tanimura) (1999)
- "Morirò in Buenos Aires" ("Moriré en Buenos Aires (Balada para mi muerte)") (live) (1985)

== N ==
- "Nel blu dipinto di blu (Volare)" (1959)
- "Nel buio" (1969)
- "Nel cielo" (2011)
- "Nel letto in cui siamo staremo" (1971)
- "Nel silenzio splende" (1985)
- "Nell' attimo breve" (1976)
- "Nella notte che geme il tuo patire" (2004)
- "Nella notte che geme il tuo patire" (live) (2007)
- "Nessuno di voi" (1966)
- "Nessuno di voi" (live) (1966)
- "New York" (1965 version) (1965)
- "New York" (1978 version) (1978)
- "Ninna nanna 1932" (1975)
- "Ninnolo" (1965)
- "No time, no space" (in Italian and English) (1989)
- "No time, no space" (in Italian, Spanish and English) (1989)
- "No, uomini no" (1998)
- "Nomi" (2011)
- "Non arrenderti" ("Keep Your Hand on That Plow") (1974)
- "Non c'è l'ho con te" (1993)
- "Non ci sono lacrime" (1962)
- "Non conosco nessun Patrizio!" (2010)
- "Non è follia" (1960)
- "Non finirà mai" (1980)
- "Non mi va" (1965)
- "Non pensarmi più" (1962)
- "Non piangere più Argentina" ("Don't Cry for Me Argentina") (1977)
- "Non piangere più Argentina" ("Don't Cry for Me Argentina") (live) (1982)
- "Non sapevo" (1962)
- "Non sapevo" (live) (1967)
- "Non sapevo" (live) (1970)
- "Non sono Butterfly" (1982)
- "Non voglio essere" (1977)
- "Notte italiana" (1983)
- "Notte malinconica"
- "Nottegiorno" (1983)
- "Notturno in blue" (1963)
- "Nulla rimpiangerò" ("Non, je ne regrette rien") (1961 version) (1961)
- "Nulla rimpiangerò" ("Non, je ne regrette rien") (1970 version) (1970)

== O ==
- "Occhi saraceni" (1983)
- "Oh, Tabarin" (live) (1992)
- "Oltre le colline" (1973)
- "Ombra mai fu" ("Largo from Xerxes") (1992)
- "Ore perdute" (1962)

== P ==
- "Parigi sorride" (1966)
- "Parlami d'amore, Mariù" (live) (1992)
- "Passeggiare" (duet with Gino Bramieri) (1969)
- "Pazza di me" (1965)
- "Per cosa?" (1993)
- "Per i morti di Reggio Emilia" (1976)
- "Per sempre, per sempre" (1965)
- "Per te Armenia" (with Charles Aznavour, Mia Martini, Enzo Jannacci, Nilla Pizzi, Iva Zanicchi, and more) (1989)
- "Per un basin" (1980)
- "Perchè io?" (1966)
- "Perdersi" (1974)
- "Piangeva tra la folla" (1960)
- "Piccolo teatro" ("Miroloi Tis Vrohis") (1979)
- "Piedi adorati" (duet with Giovanni Nuti) (2005)
- "Pierre" (1993)
- "Pigramente" (1966)
- "So che nel cielo" ("Poema") (1968)
- "Portami un fiore" (1996)
- "Poggibonsi" (1982)
- "Potemkin" (1989)
- "Preludio para el año 3001 (Rinascerò)" (live) (1984) (with Ástor Piazzola)
- "Preludio para el año 3001 (Rinascerò)" (live) (1998)
- "Preludio para el año 3001 (Rinascerò)" (live) (2005) (with Tangoseís)
- "Presidente" (1977)
- "Prima di venire" (2004)
- "Prima di venire" (Leterra a Mollica) (live) (2007)
- "Primo amore" (1969)
- "Profumo d'amore" (1998)
- "Prologo" (2011)

== Q ==
- "Quaggiù in Filanda" ("On Top of Old Smoky") (1976)
- "Qualcosa di mio" (1969)
- "Qualcosa di mio" (live) (1969)
- "Qualcosa di mio" (live) (1970)
- "Quando il sipario" (1980)
- "Quando il sipario" (live) (1982)
- "Quando l'amore diventa poesia" (1969)
- "Quando le rose rosse" (1964)
- "Quando nevica nel cuore" (1999)
- "Quando parto per il mare" (1964)
- "Quando sarai più grande" (1965)
- "Quando venni via da te" (1996)
- "Quattro vestiti" (1962)
- "Quattro vestiti" (live) (1963)
- "Quella rosa" (1969)
- "Questa notte la luna" (2007)
- "Questa specie d'amore" (1972)

== R ==
- "Rapsodie gitane" (1988)
- "Re di cuori" (live) (1963)
- "Re di cuori" (live) (1978)
- "Re di cuori" (live) (1992)
- "Recitativo Zaza-Bussy" (1994)
- "Recitativo Zaza-Cascart" (1994)
- "Ricominciar" (1962)
- "Ricorda" (1962)
- "Ricorda" (live) (1963)
- "Ricorda" (live) (1998) (limited release)
- "Ricordo di Maria A." (1996)
- "Ridevi" {Theme from "L'alibi"} (1972)
- "Risveglio di primavera" (2010)
- "Ritorna amore" (1961)
- "Rodriguez morirai" ("Rodríguez Pena") (1968)
- "Roman love" (1961)
- "Romantic cha cha cha" (1961)
- "Rovente" (2007)

== S ==
- "Salomè (Abat-Jour)" (live) (1998) (limited release)
- "Sbarre"
- "Scettico blues" (1963)
- "Se ci sarà" (1972)
- "Se credi" (1963)
- "Se fondata e questa Mahagonny" (1980)
- "Se lui si gira e mi guarda" (1994)
- "Se ne andranno tutti" (1965)
- "Se non ti avessi amato" (1969)
- "Se piangere dovrò" (1969)
- "Se puoi parlare" (1972)
- "Se ritornerai" (1968)
- "Se ti va" (1993)
- "Se ti va sono qui" ("Où vas-tu mon amour") (1973)
- "Sette rose son là" (1996)
- "Segnali di vita" (2010)
- "Segui il vento" (1967)
- "Senza bagagli" ("Afti Pou Tha 'Rthou Eleftheriou") (1979)
- "Senza il tuo amore" (1960)
- "Senza stelle" ("Les voyageurs sans étoiles") (1961)
- "Senza te" (1974)
- "Serenata francese" (1963)
- "Sfere impazzite" (1964)
- "Sia per sempre" (1962)
- "Simone (Ça n'a pas d'importance)" (1965 version) (1965)
- "Simone (Ça n'a pas d'importance)" (1978 version) (1978)
- "Simone (Ça n'a pas d'importance)" (live) (1992)
- "Sinfonia d'amore" ("Symphonie") (1961)
- "Sinfonia d'amore" ("Symphonie") (extended version) (1961)
- "Sognavo, amore mio" (1973)
- "Sogno di libertà" ("To Perigali") (1979)
- "Sola" (1971)
- "Soldato nencini" (1980)
- "Sonny Boy" (1965)
- "Sono felice" (1990 version) (1990)
- "Sono felice" (1993 version) (1993)
- "Sono io la tua donna" ("Les trois cloches") (1970)
- "Sono matta da legare" (1974)
- "Sono nata il 21 a primavera" (2004)
- "Sotto le querce di Potsdam" (1975)
- "Spazio" (with Giovanni Nuti) (2004)
- "Spazzacamino" (1963)
- "Stanotte al Luna Park" (1962)
- "Stasera mi sento in bandiera" (1969)
- "Storie da dancing" (1985)
- "Stranieri" ("Eleni") (1998)
- "Stranieri" ("Eleni") (live) (1998) (limited release)
- "Strumpfel lump" (2011)
- "Sul suicidio" (1996)
- "Suoneranno le sei (Balada para mi muerte)" (Moriré en Buenos Aires) (live) (with Ástor Piazzola) (1984)
- "Suoneranno le sei (Balada para mi muerte)" (Moriré en Buenos Aires) (live) (1998)
- "Suoneranno le sei (Balada para mi muerte)" (Moriré en Buenos Aires) (live) (with Tangoseís) (2005)
- "Surabaya Johnny" ("Das Lied von Surabaya Johnny") (1971)

== T ==
- "Ta ra ra bum di è" (1965)
- "Tabarin (La Duchessa del Tabarin)" (1965)
- "Tabori" (2011)
- "Tamburino, ciao" (1967)
- "Tango balade" (1975)
- "Tango d'attrice" (1994)
- "Tango della Gelosia" ("Jealous of You") (1961)
- "Tango delle capinere" (1964)
- "Tango italiano" (1962)
- "Tempi moderni" (1982)
- "Tango notturno" (1997)
- "Tango notturno" (live) (1992)
- "Tempi moderni" (in Italian and French) (1982)
- "Tentazione" (1960)
- "Testamento" (2011)
- "The show must go on" (2007)
- "Ti credo" (1960)
- "Tornerai ("J'attendrai") (in Italian and French) (live) (1992)
- "Tre sassi bianchi" (1962)
- "Tre sigarette" (2007)
- "Tu langelo pilota" (1969)
- "Tu lo sai chi sono io" (1969)
- "Tu non esisti" (1962)
- "Tu vita" (1962)
- "Tutti o nessuno" (1975)
- "Tutto va bene" (1963)
- "Tutto va bene" (duet with Claudio Villa) (live) (1963)

== U ==
- "Un'altra stagione" (1977)
- "Un altro maggio" ("Other Side of the Universe") (1986)
- "Un'amara canzone d'amore" (1996)
- "Un amore senza storia" (1961)
- "Un cavallo si lamenta" (1975)
- "Un gelato al limon" (1998) (limited release)
- "Un interminabile viaggio" (2011)
- "Un pomeriggio e ½" ("The Painter") (1986)
- "Un sorriso" (1969)
- "Un uomo in meno" (1971)
- "Un viaggio per tornare" (1999)
- "Una Campana" (1966)
- "Una cosa" ("L'étranger") (1973)
- "Una donna sola" ("The Lady with the Braid") (1974)
- "Una giornata al mare" (1993)
- "Una storia così" (1960)
- "Una storia d'amore" (1994)
- "Una storia inventata" (1989 version) (1989)
- "Una storia inventata" (2010 version) (2010)
- "Uno a te, uno a me" ("Ta Pedia Tou Pirea") (1960)
- "Uno come noi" (1967)
- "Uno dei tanti" ("I Who Have Nothing") (1967)
- "Uomini addosso" (1990)
- "Un uomo in meno" (1972)
- "Un uomo, una donna (Intro)" ("Un homme et une femme") (1973)
- "Un uomo, una donna" ("Un homme et une femme") (1973)

== V ==
- "Va bene, ballerò" (1972)
- "Vado via" ("The Lonely Shepherd") (1994)
- "Vai con lui" (1964)
- "Vamos Nina" (live) (1985)
- "Vecchio frack" (1994)
- "Venezia t'amo" (1961)
- "Vento di mezzanotte" ("Wenn der Wind sich dreht") (1988)
- "Verdi colline" (1969)
- "Verrò" (1961)
- "Via lattea" (1989)
- "Viaggio senza bagagli" (1972)
- "Vicino al ciel" (1961)
- "Vieni con noi" (1965)
- "Vigliacco che sei" (Soleil, j'ai peur de l'ombre") (1973)
- "Vigna verde sopra il mare (2008)
- "Violino tzigano" (1961)
- "Vita" (1962)
- "Vita quotidiana" (1994)
- "Vitalità" (1962)
- "Viva la libertà" (1976)
- "Viva te" (1974)
- "Vivere o non vivere" (1967)
- "Vivrò" ("My Prayer") (1959)
- "Voglio bene al mondo" (1963)
- "Voi non sapete" (1966)
- "Volare (Nel blu dipinto di blu)" (Musicaitalia per l'Etiopia) (1984)
- "Volpe d'amore" (1998)

=== German ===
- "Alexanderplatz" (live) (1989)
- "Angst" (1990)
- "Anna, nicht weinen" (1995)
- "Arie" ("Spanish Down") (1986)
- "Auch der Mensch (1982)
- "Auch du wirst mich einmal betrügen" (1977)
- "Auf den Flügeln bunter Träume" (1977)
- "Behalt mich lieb, Cherie" (1979)
- "Bei Vollmond" (1991)
- "Beim nächsten mal tut's wieder weh" (1991)
- "Bilbao Song" (live) (1982)
- "Bist Du bei Mir" (in Italian and German) (2010)
- "Bitte nicht stören" ("Occhi Saraceni") (1983)
- "Blauer Himmel"
- "Blue Boy" (1963)
- "C'est ça, c'est la vie" (1991)
- "Christine" ("Athènes, ma ville") (Gavroche de l'an 2000) (1981)
- "Core, amore und du" (1962)
- "Da oben ist sein Zimmer" ("Finale") (1981)
- "Da oben ist sein Zimmer" ("Finale") (live) (1982)
- "Das alte Haus mit Blick auf's Meer" (1985)
- "Das Ja zum Leben" ("Canção do mar") (1999)
- "Das Lied ist aus" (1979)
- "Das Lied von Surabaya Johnny" (1996)
- "Das sind die Männer mit den graumelierten Schläfen" (1981)
- "Das Wunder der Weihnacht" (1999)
- "Dein ist mein ganzes Herz" (1994)
- "Deine Frau" ("Other Side of the Universe") (1986)
- "Deine Hand une meine Hand" (1962)
- "Deine Hände" (1994)
- "Der alte Bandonero" (1969)
- "Der Journalist" ("Karadi") (1995)
- "Der Morgen danach" ("Le matin d'après") (1981)
- "Der Mensch, der Dich Liebt" (2012)
- "Die Gedanken sind frei" (1978)
- "Die Kraft unserer Liebe" (1985)
- "Die letzte Carmen" ("Carmen") (1986)
- "Die letzte Carmen" ("Carmen") (live) (1989)
- "Die Liebe auf den ersten Blick" (1972)
- "Die Macht der Gewohnheit" ("Tin Porta Anigo To Vrady") (1979)
- "Die Macht der Gewohnheit" ("Tin Porta Anigo To Vrady") (live) (2000)
- "Die Nacht mit Dir" (1990)
- "Die Phantasie" (Let the Music Play) (1983)
- "Die Spelunken Jenny" (1989)
- "Die Tage fliehen von Tag zu Tag
- "Die Taube" (1978)
- "Die verlorene Zeit" (duet with Martina) (1985)
- "Die verpasste Gelegenheit" (1972)
- "Die Worte, die aus Liebe man spricht" (1977)
- "Die Würde" (1978)
- "Dreizehn Türen" ("Spring, Summer, Winter and Fall") (1986)
- "Du bist ein Freund" (1985)
- "Du bist sehr müde, Liebling" ("Notte italiana") (1983)
- "Du bist so klein" ("Dromi Pou Hathika") (1979)
- "Du gibst mir mehr" ("Tomorrow and Tomorrow and Tomorrow") (1986)
- "Du hast es gut" (1981)
- "Du hast es gut" (live) (1982)
- "Du kennst dich aus" ("Chi sei") (1995)
- "Du liebst nicht mit dem Herzen" (2001)
- "Du machst mir Sehnsucht" (1999)
- "Du mußt verliebt sein" ("Kratai Hronia Afti I Kolonia") (1995)
- "Du nennst es Liebe" (1995)
- "Ein Haus voller Glück" (1963)
- "Ein Kommen und Gehen" (1990)
- "Ein paar Takte Zärtlichkeit" (1972)
- "Ein Schiff wird kommen" ("Ta Pedia Tou Pirea") (1982)
- "Ein Schiff wird kommen" ("Ta Pedia Tou Pirea") (live) (1998) (limited release)
- "Ein Sonntag ohne dich" (1985)
- "Ein Traum von einem Mann" ("Le Roi des Fous") (1982)
- "Er hat gesagt" (1994)
- "Er stand da und weinte" ("E io he visto un uomo") (1982)
- "Er" ("So Long Ago, So Clear") (1981)
- "Etwas mehr" ("The Painter") (1986)
- "Eva (Du liebst ihn)" ("Eva dagli occhi di gatto") (1983)
- "Eva (Du liebst ihn)" ("Eva dagli occhi di gatto") (live) (1989)
- "Falsches Spiel" (2001)
- "Faulheit" (Familie) (1983)
- "Flauten und Stürme" ("Thalassa") (1995)
- "Freiheit (live) (2000)
- "Freiheit in meiner Sprache" ("La canzone della libertà") (1978)
- "Freiheit in meiner Sprache" ("La canzone della libertà") (1999)
- "Freiheit in meiner Sprache" ("La canzone della libertà") (live) (1982)
- "Freiheit, Gleichheit und so weiter" ("To Traino Fevyi Stis Ichto") (1979)
- "Freiheit, Gleichheit und so weiter" ("To Traino Fevyi Stis Ichto")(live) (1982)
- "Freunde, die gar keine sind" ("Ignacio") (1981)
- "Frühlingserwachen" ("Kita Mia Nihta") (1995)
- "Ganz viel Liebe" ("Tanti auguri") (1999)
- "Gefühl und Verstand" (1991)
- "Gemeinsam" (1988)
- "Gondola gondoli (Tonina Torrielli)" (1962)
- "Good Night (Reich mir zum Abschied noch einmal die Hände)" (live) (1992)
- "Good night" (1977)
- "Goody goody" (1963)
- "Grabschrift 1919" (1996)
- "Habsucht" (Familie) (1983)
- "Halt ganz still" (1979)
- "Helden" (1991)
- "Hurra, wir leben noch" (1983)
- "Hurra, wir leben noch" (1999)
- "Hurra, wir leben noch" (live) (1989)
- "Ich bin ganz ich" (1990)
- "Ich bin so gern allein" (1981)
- "Ich denk an dich, Lysistrata" ("Capitani Coraggiosi") (1983)
- "Ich hab' die Liebe wie im Traum erlebt" (1994)
- "Ich hab' keine Angst" ("To the Unknown Man") (1981)
- "Ich hab' keine Angst" ("To the Unknown Man") (live) (1982)
- "Ich hab' keine Angst" ("To the Unknown Man") (live) (1989)
- "Ich hab' mich spät von dir befreit" ("Mes Ston Kambo") (1979)
- "Ich hab' nur dich" (1999)
- "Ich habe die Liebe Wie im Trau (1994)
- "Ich müsste längst was tun" (1982)
- "Ich steh' im Regen" (1977)
- "Ich steh' im Regen" (live) (1992)
- "Ich suche Liebe" (1973)
- "Ich tät es wieder" (1990)
- "Ich weiß es selber nicht genau" (1992)
- "Ich weiß, was ich will" ("Silence in the Dark") (1986)
- "Ich würd' mit dir" (duet with Christopher Barker) (1999)
- "Ich zähle nicht nur die Jahre" (1978)
- "Im Boot der Liebe" (1963)
- "Im Schatten der Träume" (1991)
- "Immer mehr" ("Solitaire") (1982)
- "I processi del pensiero" (1989 version) (1989)
- "I processi del pensiero" (2010 version) (2010)
- "Immer und Ewig" ("Now and Forever") (1994)
- "In festen Händen" (1990)
- "In Gedanken" (1990)
- "In mein Herz fällt Regen" (1999)
- "Insert: Seeräuber-Jenny"
- "Ist der den Kummer denn auch wert" ("Afti Pou Tha 'Rthou Eleftheriou") (1979)
- "Johnny, wenn du Geburtstag hast" (1977)
- "Keine Stunde tut mir leid" (1988)
- "Keine Stunde tut mir leid" (live) (1989)
- "Keiner war so zärtlich" (1999)
- "Kennst du das auch?" ("It's Five O'Clock") (1981)
- "Kennst du das auch?" ("It's Five O'Clock") (live) (1982)
- "Kinder" (1981)
- "Komm Halt Mich Fest" ("Abrázame") (2001)
- "Komm zurück zu mir" (1988 version)
- "Komm zurück zu mir" (live) (1989)
- "Komm zurück" ("Komm zurück zu mir") (2001 version)
- "La Dolce Vita" (1991)
- "Lass das lieben Legionär" (1969)
- "Laß' der Zeit" ("Gasoline Alley") (1983)
- "Lass mich frei (La Cumparasita (Questo tango))" (1969)
- "Liebe ist ein Geheimnis" (1977)
- "Liebe ist wie ein Märchen" ("Gibigianni") (1983)
- "Liebe Ist" ("Perhaps Love") (2001)
- "Liebe Wagen" (2001)
- "Lili Marleen" (1977)
- "Mehr Glück als Verstand" ("I'll Find My Way Home") (1983)
- "Mein Gott, ich lieb Dich" (1991)
- "Meine Freundin (1982)
- "Menschen (Unterwegs nach Morgen)" (1988)
- "Menschen (Unterwegs nach Morgen)" (live) (1989)
- "Menschen an der Macht" (Alexanderplatz) (1982)
- "Moonlight Guitar" (1963)
- "Morgen früh" (1969)
- "Mußte ich nicht damit rechnen" ("Era già tutto previsto") (1983)
- "Mut zum Risiko" (1985)
- "Mutter" (1979)
- "Nach all den Jahren" ("Da troppo tempo") (2001)
- "Nach all der Zeit" (1999)
- "Neid und Epilog" (Anna I und Anna II sowie Familie) (1983)
- "Nein, ich ergeb mich nicht" (1985)
- "Niemand hat meine Tränen gesehn" (1969)
- "Nur ein Augenblick" (1994)
- "Nur wenn du mich magst" (1988)
- "Oh, Mama" (1999)
- "Oh, Tabarin" (1979)
- "Pierre" (1999)
- "Pierrot, komm trag' mich nach Haus" (1979)
- "Prolog" (Anna I und Anna II) (1983)
- "Reprise Surabaya Johnny" (live) (1982)
- "Ricardo" (1963)
- "Rosa" (1985)
- "Sag es nochmal" (1990)
- "Sag Ihr die Wahrheit" ("Eleni") (1995)
- "Sally" (1978)
- "Salome" (1979)
- "Schattenspiel" (1990)
- "Schön war's heute Abend" (1979)
- "Seeräuber Jenny"
- "Sehnst du dich nicht auch" (1985)
- "Sie sind noch jung" (1981)
- "Sing Nachtigall, sing" (1977)
- "So bin ich nun Mal (1982)
- "So fühl ich mich ohne dich" (1978)
- "Solang sich diese Erde dreht" (1988)
- "Solang sich diese Erde dreht" (live) (1989)
- "Sonntagsgesicht" ("Exis Liga Chronia Exis") (1978)
- "Sowas hilft" ("Se Dromous Makry Nous") (1979)
- "Stark sein" (1999)
- "Stark sein" (1999) (Karaokeversion)
- "Stark sein" (1999) (Radiomix)
- "Stern von Trinidad" (1962)
- "Stolz" (Anna I und Familie) (1983)
- "Surabaya Johnny" (live) (1982)
- "Tango notturno" (1977)
- "Tanz mit mir" (1988)
- "Tausendundeine Nacht" ("Mia Pista Apo Fosforo") (1995)
- "Tiefe Sehnsucht" (live) (1977)
- "Träum mit mir vom Glück" (1979)
- "Träumerei" (1994)
- "Typisch Mann (niemals verlorst Du die Kontrolle)" (1978)
- "Ungeküßt sollst du nicht schlafen gehen" (1979)
- "Unzucht" (Anna I une Anna II sowie Familie) (1983)
- "Vater" ("Miroloi Tis Vrochis") (1979)
- "Venedig im Winter" ("Shady Blue") (1986)
- "Vielleicht war es Liebe" ("Giocco d'azzardo") (1983)
- "Vollerei" (Familie) (1983)
- "Von der Freundlichkeit der Welt" (1996)
- "Von Tag zu Tag" ("Stou Pikramenou Tin Avli") (1979)
- "Wärst du doch hier" (1995)
- "Warum macht Liebe so einsam" (1979)
- "Was ich heut' fühle" (1972)
- "Weil ich will" (1991)
- "Weitergeh'n" (2001)
- "Welt aus Stein" (1991)
- "Wenn der Wind sich dreht" (1988)
- "Wenn der Wind sich dreht" (extended version) (1988)
- "Wenn der Wind sich dreht" (live) (1988)
- "Wenn wir uns wiederseh'n" (1979)
- "Wer niemals stirbt" (1988)
- "Wer will das nicht" (1982)
- "Wer will das nicht" (live) (1989)
- "Wie die Möwe Jonathan" (2012)
- "Wie ein großes Kind" (1988)
- "Wie ein großes Kind" (live) (1988)
- "Wie fliegen durch die Wogen" ("Doxa To Theo") (1979)
- "Wie Wolken" ("Search for the Truth") (1986)
- "Wieder mal" (1982)
- "Wir müssen wach sein" (1978)
- "Wir müssen wach sein" (live) (1982)
- "Wo ist der Mann?" (1969)
- "Woher kommen wir - wo gehen wir hin" (1990)
- "Wünsche" ("Thursday Morning") (1986)
- "Zärtlichkeit" (1985)
- "Zorn" (Anna I und Anna II sowie Familie) (1983)
- "Zuhalter-Ballade
- "Zu Hause" ("O Ayeras Leei Mia Proseflhi") (1979)
- "Zu Hause" ("O Ayeras Leei Mia Proseflhi") (live) (1982)
- "Zusammenleben" ("To Perigali") (1979)
- "Zusammenleben" ("To Perigali")(live) (1982)
- "Zusammenleben" ("To Perigali")(live) (1989)
- "Zuviel Nächte ohne dich" ("Io di notte") (1999) (duet with Al Bano Carrisi)
- "Zwischen heute und morgen" (1977)
- "Zwischen zwei Stühlen" ("Exis Liga Chronia Exis") (1978)

=== French ===
- "Aimer sans être aimé" (1980)
- "Alexander Platz" (1982)
- "Années de solitude" (live) (1984) (with Ástor Piazzola)
- "Années de solitude" (live) (1998)
- "Années de solitude" (live) (2005) (with Tangoseís)
- "Athènes, ma ville" ("Gavroche de l'an 2000") (1998) (live) (limited release)
- "Attends la vie" (1980)
- "Blessée" (1961)
- "Ça" (live) (1998) (limited release)
- "Ce soir à Luna Park" ("Stanotte al Luna Park") (1962) (1962)
- "C'est ça, c'est la vie" (1991)
- "Chanson égocentrique" (1998) (duet with Franco Battiato) (limited release)
- "Che tango che" (live) (1984) (with Ástor Piazzola)
- "Che tango che" (live) (1998)
- "Che tango che" (live) (2005) (with Tangoseís)
- "Désormais" (2001)
- "Die letzte Carmen" ("Carmen") (French-German version) (live) (1988)
- "Die letzte Carmen" ("Carmen") (French-German version) (1986)
- "En silence" ("In silenzio") (1982)
- "Et maintenant" (1961 version) (1961)
- "Et maintenant" (2001 version) (2001)
- "Finale (Entre Brecht et Brel)" (1984) (live) (with Ástor Piazzola)
- "Finale (Entre Brecht et Brel)" (live) (1998)
- "Gavroche de l'an 2000" (1981)
- "Hier Encore" (2001)
- "Il s'appelait tendresse" (1981)
- "J'ai peur d'aimer" (1980)
- "J'aime le silence" (1984)
- "Je ne suis pas Butterfly" ("Non solo Butterfly") (1982)
- "Je suis très bien toute seule" (1981)
- "J'oublie (Oblivion)" (1984) (live) (with Ástor Piazzola)
- "J'oublie (Oblivion)" (1998) (live)
- "J'oublie (Oblivion)" (2005) (live) (with Tangoseís)
- "La bohème" (2001)
- "La Carmagnole (1965)
- "La chanson de la vie" (1985)
- "La chanson des vieux amants"
- "La jolie journée" (1980)
- "La Marseillaise" (French national anthem) (1965)
- "La passion selon Milva" ("La passione secondo Milva") (1982)
- "La vie en rose" (2001)
- "L'amour de l'amour" (1962)
- "L'avion" ("L'aeroplano") (1982)
- "Le drapeau de l'humanité" ("It's Five O'Clock") (1981)
- "Le livre de mes souvenirs" ("To Perigali") (1980)
- "Le matin d'après" (1981)
- "Le premier matin du monde" ("Il primo mattino del mondo") (1961)
- "Le temps est loin" (1967)
- "Le voyageur sans étoile" (1961)
- "Les apprentis du paradis" (1980)
- "Les enfants du Pirée" ("Ta Pedia Tou Pirea") (1966)
- "Les enfants" (1981)
- "Les femmes du vieux temps" (1982)
- "Les feuilles mortes" (2001)
- "Les pêcheurs de perles" (1994)
- "Les quais de la gare de Berlin" ("To Treno Fevgi Stis Okto") (1980)
- "Les temps modernes" (1982)
- "Les trois temps de l'amour" (1980)
- "L'homme au coeur blessé" (1980)
- "L'important c'est la rose" (2001)
- "Lui" ("So Long Ago, So Clear") (1981)
- "L'ultima Carmen" (French-Italian version) (1986)
- "Milord" (in French & Italian) (live) (1991)
- "Milord" (1961 version) (1961)
- "Milord" (2001 version) (2001)
- "Moi, je n'ai pas peur" ("To the Unknown Man") (1981)
- "Moi, je n'ai pas peur" ("To the Unknown Man") (1998) (live) (limited release)
- "Mon Dieu" (1962)
- "Mon Dieu" (live) (1992)
- "Mon Homme" (in French) (1992)
- "Ne me quitte pas" (2001)
- "Non, je ne regrette rien" (2001)
- "Oh ! Que c'est beau" (1980)
- "Parlez-moi d'amour" (1978 version) (1978)
- "Parlez-moi d'amour" (1992) (live)
- "Parlez-moi d'amour" (2001 version) (2001)
- "Pas d'amitié à moitié" ("Ignacio") (1981)
- "Petite et pas belle" (1980)
- "Petite femme" (1981)
- "Pluie sur la mer" (1981)
- "Poggibonsi (Chanter pour ne pas pleurer)" ("Poggibonsi") (1982)
- "Quand on n'a que l'amour" (2001)
- "Que tout recommence" (1961)
- "Symphonie" (1962)
- "Tango italiano" (1962)
- "Tempi moderni" (in Italian and French) (1982)
- "Tu as seize ans" (1980)
- "Tu penses à quoi ?" ("A cosa pensi?") (1982)
- "Venise que j'aime" ("Venezia t'amo") (1961)
- "Tornerai" ("J'attendrai") (in Italian and French) (live) (1992)

=== Spanish ===
- "Balada para mi muerte" (live) (with Tangoseís) (2005)
- "Balada para un loco" (live) (1984) (with Ástor Piazzola)
- "Balada para un loco" (live) (1998)
- "Balada para un loco" (live) (2005) (with Tangoseís)
- "Besame mucho" (live) (unreleased)
- "Caminito" (duet with Julio Iglesias) (live) (unreleased)
- "Cuando salí de Cuba" ("Quando una stella cade") (1969)
- "Cuatro vestidos" ("Quattro vestiti") (1962)
- "Flamenco Rock" (1960)
- "Flamenco Rock" (live) (1970)
- "La atmósfera" ("Atmosfera") (1989)
- "La Cucaracha" (1965 version)
- "La Cucaracha" (1975 version)
- "La pirámide de Keops" ("La piramide di Cheope") (1989)
- "La primavera del '55" (1996)
- "La respuesta de la novia" ("La risposta della novia")
- "Las víctimas del corazón" ("Le vittime del cuore") (1989)
- "Los cuatro generales" (1965 version)
- "Los cuatro generales" (1975 version)
- "Los niños del Pireo" (1961)
- "Los pájaros perdidos" (live) (1984) (with Ástor Piazzola)
- "Los pájaros perdidos" (live) (1998)
- "Los pájaros perdidos" (live) (2005) (with Tangoseís)
- "Los procesos del pensamiento" (1989)
- "No Time, No Space" (in Spanish and English) (1989)
- "¿Por qué me dejas?" ("Et maintenant")
- "Potemkin" (1989)
- "Simón Bolivar" (1976)
- "Tema de María" (2000)
- "Una historia inventada" ("Una storia inventata") (1989)
- "Vamos Nina" (live) (1984) (with Ástor Piazzola)
- "Vamos Nina" (live) (1998)
- "Venceremos" (1976)
- "Yo soy María" (from "María de Buenos Aires") (live) (with Ástor Piazzola) (1984)
- "Yo soy María" (from "María de Buenos Aires") (Extended version) (2000)
- "Yo soy María" (from "María de Buenos Aires") (live) (1998)
- "Yo soy María" (from "María de Buenos Aires") (live) (with Tangoseís) (2005)
- "Tema de María" (live) (with Tangoseís) (2000)

=== Neapolitan ===
- "Napule ca se scetà" (1962)
- "'O Surdato 'Nnamurato" (1978) (live)
- "O' Surdato 'Nnammurato" (1992) (live)
- "O' café" (1994)
- "A' Serenata e' Pulecenella" (1997)
- "Canzone appassiunata" (1978 version) (1978)
- "Canzone appassiunata" (live) (1992)
- "Canzone appassiunata" (1997 version) (1997 version)
- "Chiove" (1978 version) (1978)
- "Chiove" (1997 version) (1997)
- "Chiove" (live) (1992)
- "Fenesta vascia (tradizionale)" (1997)
- "Funiculì, Funiculà" (1997)
- "Guapparia" (1997)
- "Lacreme napulitane" (1997)
- "Marechiare" (1997)
- "O' Paese d'o Sole" (1997)
- "'O Sole Mio" (1997)
- "Santa Lucia Luntana" (1997)
- "Serenata a Surriento" (1997)
- "Tarantelluccia" (1997)
- "Te voglio bene assaje (tradizionale)" (1997)
- "Torna" (1997)
- "Torna a Surriento" (1997)

=== English ===
- "Angelo del rock" (duet with Franco Battiato) (in Italian and English) (1989)
- "Don't Ask Me Why"
- "I'll Set My Love to Music" (1964)
- "L'aeroplano (Lucy in the Sky with Diamonds)" (in English and Italian) (1982)
- "Let the Music Play" (1983)
- "Loneliness of Autumn"
- "Love Is a Feeling" (1967)
- "Marinero" (1985)
- "Marinero" (extended version) (1985)
- "Marinero" (mix) (1985)
- "Medley: Motherless Child & Non arrenderti uomo" (medley) (duet with Mina accompanied by I Folkstudio Gospel) (live) (in English and Italian) (1972)
- "Memory" (from the musical "Cats") (performed live) (unreleased)
- "Moon of Alabama (Alabama Song)" (Live) (1975)
- "Moon of Alabama (Alabama Song)" (Live) (1982)
- "My Flame of Love" (1980)
- "No Time, No Space" (in English and Italian) (1989)
- "No Time, No Space" (in English and Spanish) (1989)
- "People in Love Can Be Lonely"
- "Romeo"
- "Seasons of Love" (1967)
- "September Song" (live) (1992)
- "Spring, Summer, Winter and Fall" (with Vangelis) (1986)
- "The Man I Love" (1978)
- "The Man I Love" (live) (1992)
- "To Be a Star" (live) (1998) (limited release)
- "You Too"

=== Japanese ===
- "Ai no finale" (1972)
- "Ai no sanazami" (1972)
- "Finale d'amore" (live) (1970)
- "Iigia naino shiawase naraba" (1972)
- "Koi no kisetsu" (1972)
- "Koibito" (1972)
- "Kyou de owakare" (1972)
- "La stella per noi" (in Japanese) (1970)
- "Mediterraneo" (live) (1972)
- "Minatomachi blues" (1972)
- "Nessuno di voi" (1972)
- "Ningiyo no ie" (1972)
- "Non sapevo" (in Japanese)
- "Olikaesi kanasimi yuki"
- "Omoide o keshite (1972)
- "Oh kamisama (1972)
- "Sakariba blues" (1972)
- "Una sera di Tokyo"(in Japanese) (1970)
- "Yoake no uta" (1972)
- "Yoare no scat" (1972)
- "Yuzuki" (1972)

=== Greek ===
- "Sto perigiali" (live) (2000)
- "Thalassa" (1994)
- "Thalassa" (live) (1998) (limited release)

=== Korean ===
- "Barley Field"

=== Latin ===
- "Ave Maria"
- "Ave Maria" (2000)
- "Ave Maria" (live) (feat. Tangoseís) (2005)

=== Other ===
- "Adiós, nonino" (instrumental) (live) (1998)
- "Adiós, nonino" (instrumental) (by Tangoseís) (2000)
- "Adiós, nonino" (instrumental) (by Tangoseís) (2005) (live)
- "Al pintor aldo severi" (instrumental) (1998)
- "Aria di Parigi" (instrumental) (1994)
- "Charles Aznavour prend un café avec Astor Piazzolla" (instrumental) (2001)
- "Charlot joue avec Aznavour..." (instrumental) (2001)
- "Decarisimo (instrumental) (by Ástor Piazzola) (live) (2000)
- "Decarisimo (instrumental) (by Tangoséis) (2000)
- "Édith Piaf emporte autant que le vent 'La vie en rose'..." (instrumental) (2001)
- "Fueyazo" (instrumental) (live) (1998)
- "Gilbert Bécaud passant par Broadway..." (instrumental) (2001)
- "Gli occhi di Milva" (recited by Alda Merini) (2004)
- "I Got Rhythm" (instrumental) (1992)
- "Jacques Brel chez Leonard Bernstein..." (instrumental) (2001)
- "Juliette Gréco au manège" (instrumental) (2001)
- "La muerte del ángel" (instrumental) (live) (1998)
- "La muerte del ángel" (instrumental) (live) (by Tangoseís) (2005)
- "La terra santa" (recited by Alda Merini) (2004)
- "La terra santa" (recited by Alda Merini) (live) (2007)
- "Llamada de tambores" (instrumental) (1998)
- "Mujer de Buenos Aires" (instrumental)
- "Mujer de Buenos Aires" (instrumental) (1998)
- "Nonino" (instrumental) (live) (by Tangoseís) (1998)
- "Mumuki" (instrumental) (live) (1998)
- "Stark Sein" (karaoke version)
- "Un bandoneon in una sera di Tokyo" (instrumental) (live) (1998)
- "Yves Montand court toujours après sa Titine au Brasil" (instrumental) (2001)
- "Yves Montand écrivant une dernière lettre à Marylin..." (instrumental) (2001)
