= It's Five O'Clock =

Studio album by Aphrodite's Child
- Released: 27 November 1969
- Recorded: 16 – 21 June 1969
- Studios: Trident Studios, London
- Genre: Psychedelic pop
- Length: 35:01
- Label: Polydor
- Producer: Aphrodite's Child

Aphrodite's Child chronology
End of the World (1968)	It's Five O'Clock (1969)	666 (1972)

Singles from It's Five O'Clock
- 1. "Let Me Love, Let Me Live" Released: 1969; 2. "Marie Jolie" Released: 1969; 3. "It's Five O'Clock" Released: 1970

Professional ratings
Review scores
Source	Rating
AllMusic	4/5 stars

It's Five O'Clock is the second studio album by Greek band Aphrodite's Child.

== Track listing ==
All songs written by Richard Francis and Vangelis Papathanassiou, except where noted.

Side one
No.	Title	Writer(s)	Length
1.	"It's Five O'Clock"		3:31
2.	"Wake Up"		4:04
3.	"Take Your Time"		2:39
4.	"Annabella"	Richard Adams, Demis Roussos	3:45
5.	"Let Me Love, Let Me Live"	Richard Francis, Lucas Sideras	4:43

Side two
No.	Title	Writer(s)	Length
1.	"Funky Mary"		4:11
2.	"Good Time So Fine"	Valerie Johnson, Vangelis Papathanassiou	2:45
3.	"Marie Jolie"		4:41
4.	"Such a Funny Night"		4:34

== Personnel ==
Aphrodite's Child

- Vangelis – keyboards, organ, piano, clavichord, flutes, production
- Demis Roussos – lead vocals, bass, guitar, trumpet, production
- Lucas Sideras – drums, percussion, production, lead vocals on "Let Me Love, Let Me Live" and "Funky Mary"

Technical

- Malcolm Toft – engineer
- Hitoshi Takiguchi – mastering

== Releases ==
The album was re-released in the UK on Esoteric Recordings in 2010.

== Certifications ==
Region	Certification	Certified units/sales
France (SNEP)	Gold	100,000^{*}
^{*} Sales figures based on certification alone.
