= Amber Run =

British indie rock band

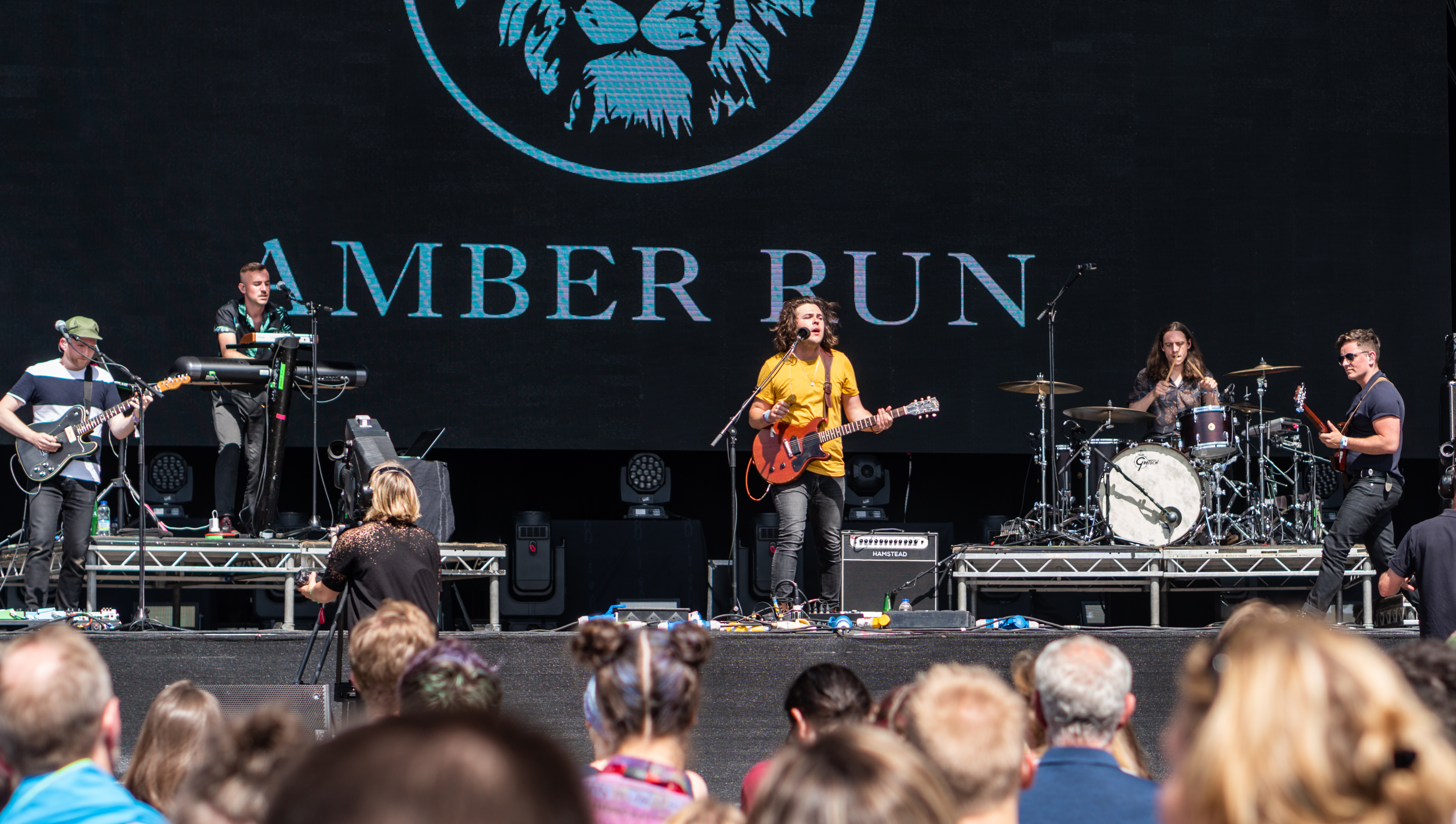
- Amber Run performing in 2018

Background information
- Origin: Nottingham, England
- Genres: Indie pop; alternative rock; indie rock
- Years active: 2012–present
- Labels: RCA, Sony Music Entertainment
- Members: Joshua Keogh; Tom Sperring; Henry Wyeth
- Past members: Felix Archer; Will Jones
- Website: www.amber-run.com

Amber Run are a British indie rock band from Nottingham, composed of Joshua "Joe" Keogh, Tom Sperring, and Henry Wyeth. The band have released three full-length albums, three mini-albums, and five EPs. Initially called Amber, they later changed their name to avoid conflict with the Dutch dance-pop singer of same name.

== History ==
=== Formation ===
Joshua Keogh, Tom Sperring, and Will Jones were originally friends from Buckinghamshire at Dr Challoner's Grammar School, where they played in an alternative rock band. With Felix Archer from the same area and Henry Wyeth from Kent, they met while studying at the University of Nottingham. They all studied for degrees in humanities and law but abandoned their studies in the second year to focus on the band. Keogh initially performed under his own name and started to get "a bit of momentum [so] we sat down and jammed out one day and there was something about it. It was so much better than what I was doing solo, so we started a band".

Thanks to local BBC presenter Dean Jackson, the band featured on the BBC Introducing stage at Reading Festival in 2013—only the fourth show the band had ever played. Their presence attracted a number of A&R people to the show, and after a few weeks of negotiating, the band signed to RCA.

=== 2014–2015: Noah and debut album ===
On 14 February 2014, Amber Run released their first EP, Noah, which consisted of four songs. Two months later, after supporting Kodaline on their March 2014 tour, they released their second EP, titled Spark, on 18 April 2014. Their third EP, Pilot, was released on 19 September 2014.

In March 2014, the band announced they had been recording their debut album throughout January and February, with Mike Crossey and Sam Winfield, "who's in many ways the sixth member of our band".

In July and August 2014, the group released videos for the singles "I Found" and "Pilot", respectively. Speaking to LeftLion magazine in December 2014, they explained: "We were already discussing what to do with it [I Found]; it's not a song that screams "single" but we wanted to release it in some form. Releasing it with "Pilot" just seemed to be a good method to bring attention to the whole EP, and doing something creative with the videos is a bit more interesting. Linking the videos gives you more scope... [to] expand the storyline past three and a half minutes."

On 1 December 2014, Amber Run announced the release of "Just My Soul Responding". The song was confirmed as the lead single from their upcoming debut album, in regards to which frontman Keogh said, "[the] album is done and we've signed it off. Now it's deciding the best time to get them out". The video for "Just My Soul Responding" was uploaded on 18 December 2014, and the single was released on 5 January 2015.

The band's debut album, 5am, was issued on 20 April 2015. Felix Archer departed the band in early 2016. On 15 April 2016, the band released a new single, "Haze".

=== 2016–2018: For a Moment, I Was Lost and The Assembly ===
In 2016, Amber Run released "Stranger" as the first single from their second album, For a Moment, I Was Lost. A second single, titled "Perfect", came out in February 2017. The album was published digitally on 10 February, with a physical release occurring on 17 March. Later, the band put out two singles, "The Weight" and "Heaven Is a Place", on 16 March 2018 and 13 April 2018, respectively. On 11 May 2018, The Assembly was released as an EP, containing the two aforementioned singles and another, titled "Amen", with a second rendition that featured London Contemporary Voices.

=== 2019–present: Philophobia, unplugged EP, mini-album trilogy, and How to Be Human ===
Between November 2018 and September 2019, Amber Run released five singles—"Carousel", "Affection", "Neon Circus", "The Darkness Has a Voice", and "What Could Be as Lonely as Love"—preceding the release of their third album, Philiophobia, on 28 September 2019. On 26 June 2020, they issued an unplugged EP, featuring six songs from Philophobia. On 4 November 2021, they published a new mini-album, The Search (Act I), the first in a trilogy of mini-albums that would be released throughout the following year. The Start (Act II) came out on 3 June 2022. On 22 July, a new single, "Cradle" was put out, followed by "Funeral" on 2 September, concluding with the release of the third and final mini-album in the trilogy, The Hurt (Act III), on 2 November. Following this, Amber Run announced that their upcoming full-length album, How to Be Human, would come out in April 2023, with a coinciding UK tour running between 13 and 20 April 2023. The Harvard Crimson wrote, "Through Amber Run's eyes, the listener experiences the bittersweet and anything but linear journey of losing and finding, laughing and crying, loving and longing..."

== Band members ==
Current

- Joshua Keogh – vocals, guitar
- Tom Sperring – bass guitar
- Henry Wyeth – keys

Past

- Will Jones – guitar
- Felix Archer – drums

== Discography ==
=== Studio albums ===
Title	Details	Peak chart positions
Title	Details	UK
5am	Released: 27 April 2015; Label: RCA, Sony Music Entertainment; Format: CD, vinyl, digital download	36
For a Moment, I Was Lost	Released: 10 February 2017; Label: Easy Life Records; Format: CD, vinyl, digital download	49
Philophobia	Released: 27 September 2019; Label: Easy Life Records; Format: CD, vinyl, digital download	—
How to Be Human	Released: 23 February 2023; Label: Tripel; Format: CD, vinyl, digital download	—

=== EPs ===
Title	Details
Noah	Released: 14 February 2014; Label: RCA, Sony Music Entertainment; Format: Digital download
Spark	Released: 18 April 2014; Label: RCA, Sony Music Entertainment; Format: Digital download
Pilot	Released: 19 September 2014; Label: RCA, Sony Music Entertainment; Format: Digital download
Acoustic EP	Released: 21 September 2017; Label: Easy Life Records; Format: Digital download
The Assembly	Released: 11 May 2018; Label: Easy Life Records; Format: CD, digital download

=== Singles ===
Title	Year	Certifications	Album
"Noah"	2013		5am
"Heaven"	2013		5am
"Spark"	2014		5am
"I Found"	2014	UK: Gold; RIAA: Platinum	5am
"Just My Soul Responding"	2015		5am
"Haze"	2016		For a Moment, I Was Lost
"Stranger"	2016		For a Moment, I Was Lost
"No Answers"	2016		For a Moment, I Was Lost
"Fickle Game"	2017		For a Moment, I Was Lost
"Carousel"	2018		Philophobia
52 Blue	2021		
