= Aphrodite's Child =

Greek musical band

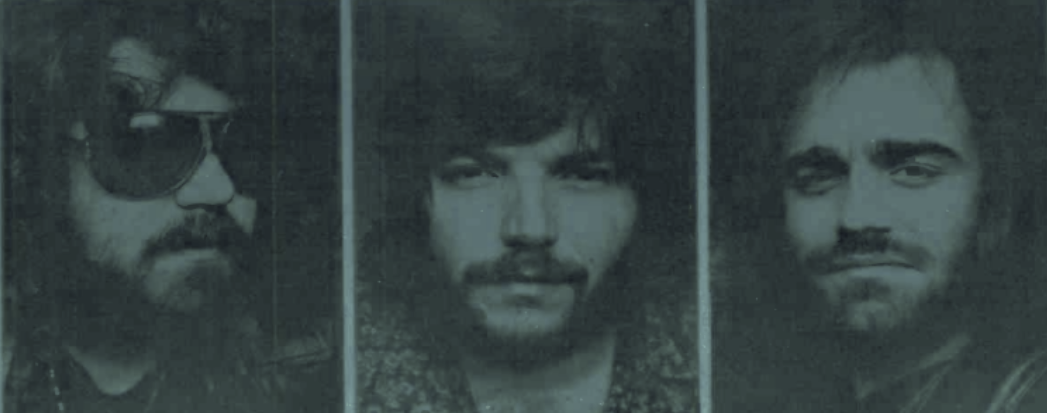
- Aphrodite's Child in 1970. From left to right: Evangelos Papathanassiou, Loukas Sideras, and Demis Roussos.

Background information
- Origin: Greece
- Genres: Progressive rock; psychedelic rock; art rock; psychedelic pop; baroque pop
- Years active: 1967–1972
- Labels: Mercury, Vertigo
- Past members: Evangelos Papathanassiou; Demis Roussos; Loukas Sideras; Silver Koulouris

Aphrodite's Child was a Greek pop and rock band formed in 1967 by Evangelos Papathanassiou, later known professionally as Vangelis (keyboards, flutes), Demis Roussos (bass, acoustic and electric guitar, vocals), Loukas Sideras (drums and vocals), and Silver Koulouris (guitar). They initially found success in Europe with hit singles like "Rain and Tears", "End of the World", "I Want to Live", and "It's Five O'Clock", before pivoting to progressive rock with their third and final album, 666 (1972). An ambitious concept album inspired by the Book of Revelation, it later gained critical acclaim and has appeared on a number of lists of the top progressive and psychedelic albums of all time.

== History ==
=== Origins ===
Papathanassiou and Roussos had already been successful in Greece, playing in the bands The Forminx and Idols respectively, when they got together with Sideras and Koulouris to form a new band. Their band's name was derived from the title of a track from another Mercury act, Dick Campbell, from his Sings Where It's At album.

Their first recording as a band was for George Romanos' album In Concert and in Studio where they played on four songs and were credited as "Vangelis and his Orchestra". In the same year, they recorded a two-song demo and submitted it to Philips Records. It was probably Vangelis's idea that the still-anonymous band should be relocated to London, which would be a more suitable environment for their music, as their country had entered a right-wing dictatorship in 1967. This decision, however, was not problem-free. Koulouris had to stay in Greece to fulfill his military service, while the band, on their way to London, got stuck in Paris partly because they did not have the correct work permits and partly because of the strikes associated with the May 1968 events.

=== Paris, and first album ===
In Paris the band signed to Mercury Records and were christened "Aphrodite's Child" by Lou Reizner, releasing their second single "Rain and Tears", a reworking of Pachelbel's Canon in D major. With this song the band became an overnight sensation in France and several other European countries in which the single charted well, despite the song being sung in English. It sold over one million copies, and was awarded a gold disc. In October of the same year, the band released their first album End of the World. The album contained equal amounts of psychedelic pop songs and ballads in the vein of Procol Harum or The Moody Blues.

The band began touring around Europe, and in January 1969 they recorded a single in Italian for the Sanremo Festival, in which they did not participate. Their next hit single was "I Want to Live", an arrangement of the song "Plaisir d'amour".

=== Recording in London and second album ===
For their second album, the band traveled to London to record at the Trident Studios. The first single from the album, "Let Me Love, Let Me Live" was released in November, while the album It's Five O'Clock came out in January 1970. It featured more successful ballads (like the title song), but also songs that crossed many musical genres including country rock.

After their second album, the band began touring again, this time without Vangelis who preferred to stay in Paris and record the music for Henry Chapier's film, Sex Power. For promotional appearances live and on television, Vangelis was replaced on stage as keyboard player by his brother Nikos Papathanassiou. The year 1970 went by with the band promoting their latest album and Vangelis working on his first film project. To keep the steady flow of hits, the band released another single in August 1970, "Spring, Summer, Winter and Fall". The band toured Spain and Italy, again without Vangelis, and with Harris Halkitis standing in on keyboards.

=== Third album – 666, and breakup ===
In late 1970, the band began to record a musical adaptation of the biblical Book of Revelation, entitled 666. Koulouris, having finished his Greek army duty, rejoined the band. However, relations between the band members were declining, and things continued to worsen during the methodically slow recording process.

Essentially, the ambitious double album was Vangelis's concept, created with an outside lyricist, Costas Ferris. The music Vangelis composed was much more psychedelic- and progressive rock-oriented than anything the band had done before. This did not sit well with the other band members, who wished to continue in the pop direction that had brought them success. Furthermore, Roussos was being groomed for a solo career, having recorded and released his first solo single "We Shall Dance" (with Sideras on drums) and his first solo album On the Greek Side of My Mind.

Meanwhile, Vangelis turned his attention to recording the score for the 1970 French TV documentary L'Apocalypse des animaux, and worked on a single with his then-girlfriend Vilma Ladopoulou, performing with Koulouris under the pseudonym "Alpha Beta". By the time 666 was finally released almost two years later in June 1972, the band had already split up, despite having sold over 20 million records and remaining popular throughout Europe.

Both Vangelis and Roussos pursued successful solo careers: Roussos had a thriving solo career as a pop singer, and Vangelis went on to become a highly regarded electronic music artist. Vangelis's work composing movie soundtracks brought him much success for the next three decades, including an Oscar for Chariots of Fire. Vangelis's other soundtracks include Ridley Scott's Blade Runner (1982), to which Roussos contributed vocals, 1492: Conquest of Paradise (1992) and Oliver Stone's Alexander (2004).

Koulouris worked with both Roussos and Vangelis on occasion, while Sideras pursued a less successful solo career, releasing two albums and four singles after the break-up. Roussos died in 2015, and Vangelis in 2022.

== Influence and legacy ==
Despite their short existence and lack of hit singles outside of Europe, the band is still regarded as a cult band. Their album 666 is often considered their masterpiece, in addition to being one of rock music's first concept albums. The album caught the attention of many musicians in the progressive rock field, including Yes frontman Jon Anderson, who would later collaborate with Vangelis (as Jon and Vangelis). Contemporary progressive rock acts such as Astra have also cited the band as an influence.

== Covers and samples ==
=== Covers ===
- In 2001, German heavy metal band Axxis released a cover of "The Four Horsemen" on their album Eyes of Darkness.
- In 2004, Gregorian released a cover of "The Four Horsemen" on their album The Dark Side.
- In 2005, German dance group Scooter released a Techno version of "The Four Horsemen" called The Leading Horse on their album Who's Got The Last Laugh Now?.
- In 2015, the Greek band Cyanna Mercury (formerly known as Cyanna) covered "The Four Horsemen" on the Death Roots Syndicate compilation The End.
- In 2022, American artist Brandon Boyd of Incubus released a cover of "End of The World" from the album "End of the World" on his solo album Echoes & Cocoons.
- "The Four Horsemen" has proven an especially popular cover among European heavy metal bands. Bands that have covered the song include the Italian band Death SS (on their 2006 album The 7th Seal), the Swedish doom metal band Griftegård (on an EP released through Ván Records in 2015), and the Greek black metal band Rotting Christ (on their 2016 album Rituals).
- On their 2022 tour, Opeth covered the chant "Seven Bowls" (666).

=== Samples ===
- In 1990, several tracks from the 666 album were sampled for the first Enigma album, MCMXC a.D..
- The P-Model song "Biiig Eye" (from 1993's Big Body) features a sample of the track 'Loud, Loud, Loud'.
- The Verve's song "The Rolling People" (from their 1997 album Urban Hymns) borrows its title from "Altamont", while also containing musical elements of "The Four Horsemen". Frontman Richard Ashcroft reportedly mentioned 666 as a strong influence on his music.
- Deltron 3030 sampled the opening lyrics of 'Loud, Loud, Loud' in the track 'Mastermind'.
- Beck's song "Chemtrails" (from his 2008 album Modern Guilt) also resembles "The Four Horsemen".
- Daniel Lopatin's song "A7" (from the album Chuck Person's Eccojams Vol. 1) under the alias Chuck Person also samples the track "The Four Horsemen".

== Discography ==
=== Albums ===
==== Studio albums ====
- End of the World (October 1968)
- It's Five O'Clock (November 1969) – FRA #1, IT #6
- 666 (June 1972) – IT #23

==== Compilation albums ====
- Best of Aphrodite's Child (1971) – SPA #8
- Reflection (1971)
- Rain and Tears – The Best of Aphrodite's Child (1975)
- Aphrodite's Child's Greatest Hits (1995)
- The Singles (1995)
- The Complete Collection (1996)
- Babylon the Great：An Introduction to Aphrodite's Child (2002)
- The Singles+ (2003)

=== Singles ===
Year	Single	Peak chart positions									
Year	Single	BE (FLA)	BE (WA)	FRA	GER	IT	NL	NOR	SPA	SWI	UK
1968	"Plastics Nevermore" (US-only release)	—	—	—	—	—	—	—	—	—	—
1968	"Rain and Tears"	7	1	1	28	1	2	2	11	2	29
1968	"End of the World"	—	8	11	—	12	—	—	20	—	—
1969	"Quando l'amore diventa poesia"	—	—	—	—	18	—	—	—	—	—
1969	"Valley of Sadness" (France-only promo release)	—	—	—	—	—	—	—	—	—	—
1969	"I Want to Live"	—	3	3	38	9	1	—	13	8	—
1969	"Lontano Dagli Occhi"	—	—	—	—	20	—	—	—	—	—
1969	"Let Me Love, Let Me Live"	—	28	14	—	20	—	—	—	—	—
1969	"Marie Jolie"	—	28	—	—	—	7	—	—	—	—
1970	"It's Five O'Clock"	—	1	1	—	1	11	—	22	6	—
1970	"Spring, Summer, Winter and Fall"	—	12	15	—	1	12	—	16	—	—
1971	"Such a Funny Night"	—	—	—	—	—	10	—	—	—	—
1972	"Break"	—	—	—	—	—	24	—	—	—	—
"—" denotes releases that did not chart or were not released

== Bibliography ==
- Dinos Dimatatis, Get That Beat: To Elliniko Rock, 1960s–1970s. Thessaloniki: Katsanos, 1998.
