= Rembetiko (film) =

- Directed by: Costas Ferris
- Written by: Costas Ferris; Sotiria Leonardou
- Starring: Sotiria Leonardou; Nikos Dimitratos; Nikos Kalogeropoulos
- Music by: Stavros Xarhakos
- Release date: October 3, 1983
- Running time: 110 minutes
- Country: Greece
- Language: Greek

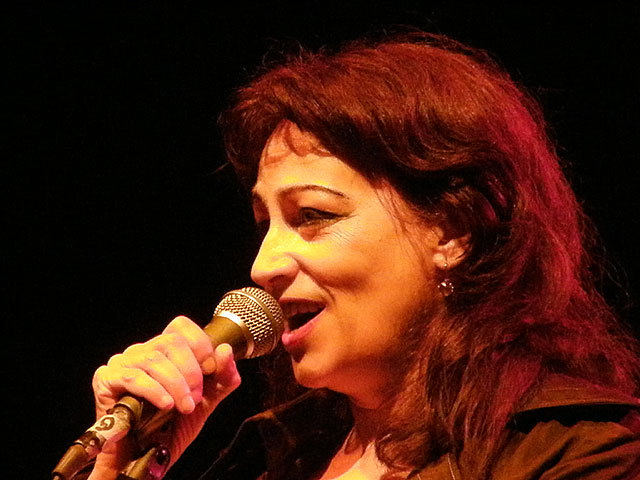
Sotiria Leonardou at Babylonmedia's international anti-authoritarian festival "B-Fest", Athens, Greece, 2009.

Rembetiko (Greek: Ρεμπέτικο) is a 1983 film directed by Costas Ferris and written by Costas Ferris and Sotiria Leonardou, with original music by Stavros Xarchakos. The film is based on the life of rebetiko singer Marika Ninou and gained cult status in Greece.

== Plot ==
This musical drama sweeps through a turbulent 40 years in popular singer Marika's (Sotiria Leonardou) life – and in the history of Greece – starting with the singer's birth in Smyrna, Asia Minor in 1917. Marika was deported to Greece along with all the other Greeks in Smyrna when she was seven years old, and a few years later, her parents started a career as a musician and a singer in a nightclub/bar. In the short space of one decade, Marika witnesses her father murder her mother, runs away from home, has a baby, and comes back to the nightclub to sing in an act with a childhood friend, Yorgos and a bouzouki player, Babis. Success finally comes at the expense of the suicide of another female singer at the club (named Rosa), but then Yorgos is exiled for political reasons, and she and Babis leave for other venues. Although Marika carries a torch for Babis, their relationship never seems to work out, and after many years and World War II go by, she sends her daughter away to a convent school (to later become a dancer in a cabaret, much to Marika's chagrin) and goes on a tour in America. She then returns to Greece to find herself supplanted by a younger singer named Matina who has caught the attention of Babis. Near the end of the movie, she is stabbed in the stomach the night of her reunion concert. Marika dies of her wounds and is buried by the people she sang with as they sing in her memory at the cemetery.

There have been hypotheses that the story is based on the life of Marika Ninou with Babis playing the part of Vasilis Tsitsanis. However, there are glaring differences between the film and the real life of Marika Ninou.

Marika Ninou only began singing after World War II. While she went to America, she never went with Vasilis Tsitsanis but in fact went with Kostas Kaplanis. She then returned to Greece and died of cancer. The film mentions a conflict with a singer named Rosa (Roza Eskenazi?) but no such incident has ever been documented.

== Awards ==
Rembetiko was nominated for the Golden Bear award at the 34th Berlin International Film Festival in 1984, and won the Silver Bear. In the same year, the film was awarded the Special Jury Award at the Valencia Film Festival. Sotiria Leonardou won the prize for "Best Actress" at the 1983 Thessaloniki Film Festival for her portrayal of Ninou and the film itself tied for "Best Picture", and won three other awards as well (two "Best Supporting Actor" prizes, and one for music). In 1984, the film was awarded the prestigious Grand Prix at the Alexandria Film Festival. In 2000, it was voted the most popular Greek film in the Internet Movie Database.

== Main cast ==
- Themis Bazaka as Andriana
- Nikos Dimitratos as Panagis
- Nikos Kalogeropoulos as Babis
- Sotiria Leonardou as Marika
- Michalis Maniatis as Giorgakis
- Spyros Mavides as Fondas
- Konstantinos Tzoumas as Yiannis ("Juan")
- Vicky Vanita as Roza
- Giorgos Zorbas as Thomas
