= 5am (album) =

Studio album by Amber Run
- Released: 20 April 2015
- Studio: Livingston Studios, London
- Genre: Alternative; indie rock; indie pop
- Length: 43:30
- Label: RCA Victor
- Producer: Mike Crossey

Amber Run chronology
Pilot (2014)	5am (2015)	For a Moment, I Was Lost (2017)

Professional ratings
Review scores
Source	Rating
The Guardian	3/5 stars
London Evening Standard	3/5 stars
musicOMH	3/5 stars
Renowned for Sound	4.5/5 stars
AllMusic	4.5/5 stars

5am is the debut studio album by the English band Amber Run, released on 20 April 2015 through RCA Victor. It was produced by Mike Crossey at Livingston Studios in London in January 2014.

The album includes the singles "I Found", "Spark", "Just My Soul Responding" and a re-recorded version of "Noah". To support the release, the band embarked on a 2015 UK/European tour. Upon release, 5am reached number 36 on the UK Albums Chart.

== Track listing ==
All tracks are written by Amber Run, except where noted.

No.	Title	Writer(s)	Length
1.	"I Found"	Joshua Keogh	4:33
2.	"M.F. (Interlude)"		0:51
3.	"Spark"		3:49
4.	"Hurricane"		3:07
5.	"Noah"	Keogh	3:54
6.	"Pilot"		3:28
7.	"CF (Interlude)"		1:54
8.	"5am"		4:18
9.	"Just My Soul Responding"	Keogh	3:59
10.	"Good Morning"		4:10
11.	"Shiver"	Keogh	4:36
12.	"See You Soon"		4:58

Deluxe Edition
No.	Title	Length
13.	"Don't Wanna Fight"	2:43
14.	"Where Do We Go From Here"	3:19
15.	"Little Ghost"	4:26
16.	"Heaven"	3:27
17.	"Kites"	4:25

== Charts ==
Chart (2015)	Peak position
UK Albums (OCC)	36
