= It's Five O'Clock (song) =

Single by Aphrodite's Child

from the album It's Five O'clock
- Released: 1969 (promo), 1970
- Label: Mercury
- Composer: Evangelos Papathanassiou
- Lyricist: Richard Francis

"It's Five O'clock" is a song by the Greek band Aphrodite's Child from their 1969 studio album It's Five O'Clock. It was also released as a single, in February 1970, on Mercury Records.

The song was written by Evangelos Papathanassiou and Richard Julian Francis. The song reached no. 6 in Switzerland and no. 11 in the Netherlands. Italian singer Milva in 1981 released a German-language version titled "Kennst du das auch?" and a French-language version titled "Le drapeau de l'humanité".

A new studio version by ex-Aphrodite's Child vocalist Demis Roussos was included on his 1987 album The Demis Roussos Story on the label BR Music. The recording was also released as a single from that album (in 1987 on BR Music).

== Track listings ==
7-inch single Mercury 6033 001 (1969, Greece)
7-inch single Mercury 132 508 MCF (1970, Germany, Netherlands, France, Belgium)
7-inch single Polydor 56791 (1970, UK)
7-inch single Mercury 132 508 MCY (1970, Italy)
7-inch single Mercury 51 32 508 (1970, Spain)
7-inch single RTB S 53592 MER (1972, Yugoslavia)

A. "It's Five O'Clock" (3:28)
B. "Funky Mary" (4:11)

7-inch EP Mercury 26 017 MCE (1970, Portugal)

1. "It's Five O'Clock" (3:20)
2. "Good Time So Fine" (2:44)
3. "Take Your Time" (2:30)
4. "Annabella" (3:20)

7-inch single Philips 6060 320 (1982, Belgium)

A. "It's Five O'Clock" (3:29)
B. "I Want to Live" (3:51)

== Charts ==
Chart (1970)	Peak position
Belgium (Ultratop 50 Wallonia)	1
Italy (FIMI)	1
Switzerland (Schweizer Hitparade)	6
Netherlands (Single Top 100)	11
France (SNEP)	1
Spain (Promusicae)	22
Chart (2015)	Peak position
France (SNEP)	177

== See also ==
- List of number-one hits of 1970 (Italy)
- List of number-one singles of 1970 (France)
