= Cyanna =

Greek rock band

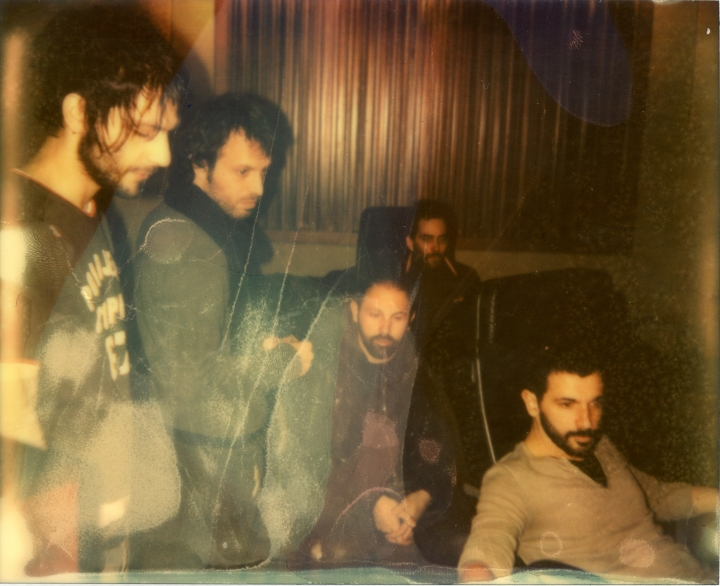

Background information
- Also known as: Cyanna
- Genres: Alternative, Rock, Electronic
- Years active: 2002–2013
- Labels: Olonmusic, Sony Music Greece, Oxymoron Records
- Spinoffs: Cyanna Mercury
- Members: Spyreas Sid; Nick Sid; Anthony Ka; Jason Tatsis; Nais Front
- Past members: George Mouzis; Ilias Madouros; Yannos P Vangelis Stavroulakis; Fotis Tyrokomos; Harry B Alx D Nikos "Mnimis"
- Website: http://cyanna.gr/

Cyanna (siāna) was a rock band from Athens, Greece formed in 1999. The sound of the band was originally based on blending keyboards and electronic beats with guitars, influenced by both alternative rock and dance music styles. Eventually the electronic elements were replaced by a more organic classic rock approach, with their last release being an acoustic folk rock EP. Cyanna was very active in the greek alternative scene from 2002 to 2013 when it was disbanded by its founders, Spyreas Sid and Nick Sid, before forming Cyanna Mercury in early 2014. The band was known for their intense live shows and constant changes in music styles, crossing over the boundaries of the underground greek alternative into and out of the mainstream realm. They shared the stage with prestigious international acts such as Massive Attack (2008), MGMT (2009), The Stranglers (2009), Fischerspooner (2009), IAMX (2010), and Gorillaz Soundsystem (2010), and did an extensive tour in Greece in 2011. The band also appeared in some european festivals in Germany, Switzerland and Bulgaria. They released 3 albums, one EP, many demos, singles, remixes and appeared in numerous compilations both in underground and major labels. Their biggest commercial hit came in 2008 with "Shine", the second single from the "Just A Crash" album, that became the Vodafone campaign song in Greece for two years (2009–2011), while their critically acclaimed best release would be their last, "The Undressed EP", an independent self funded release, that included "I Am Cannibal".

== Discography ==
=== Albums ===
- άγγιξέ.το [Take.Dive] (Olonmusic, 2004)
- Just A Crash (Sony Music, 2008)
- End Is Near (Sony Music, 2010)
- The Undressed EP (Oxymoron Records, 2012)

=== Video Singles ===
- Done Be (2008)
- Shine (2008)
- Like Fire (2009)
- Perfect Mistake (2010)
- Miles and Miles (2011)
- I Am Cannibal (2013)

=== Compilations ===
- "Liquid Breath" album: Made In Greece Vol.1 – The World Of Greek Grooves (Lola's World, 2005)
- "Zavara" – album: Greek Cinema Revisited (Sony Music, 2008)
- "Τίποτα" – album: Pixel (Sony Music, 2009)
- "Διαβάτης Της Ζωής" album: Retropolis (Metropolis Press, 2011)
