= Skipp Whitman =

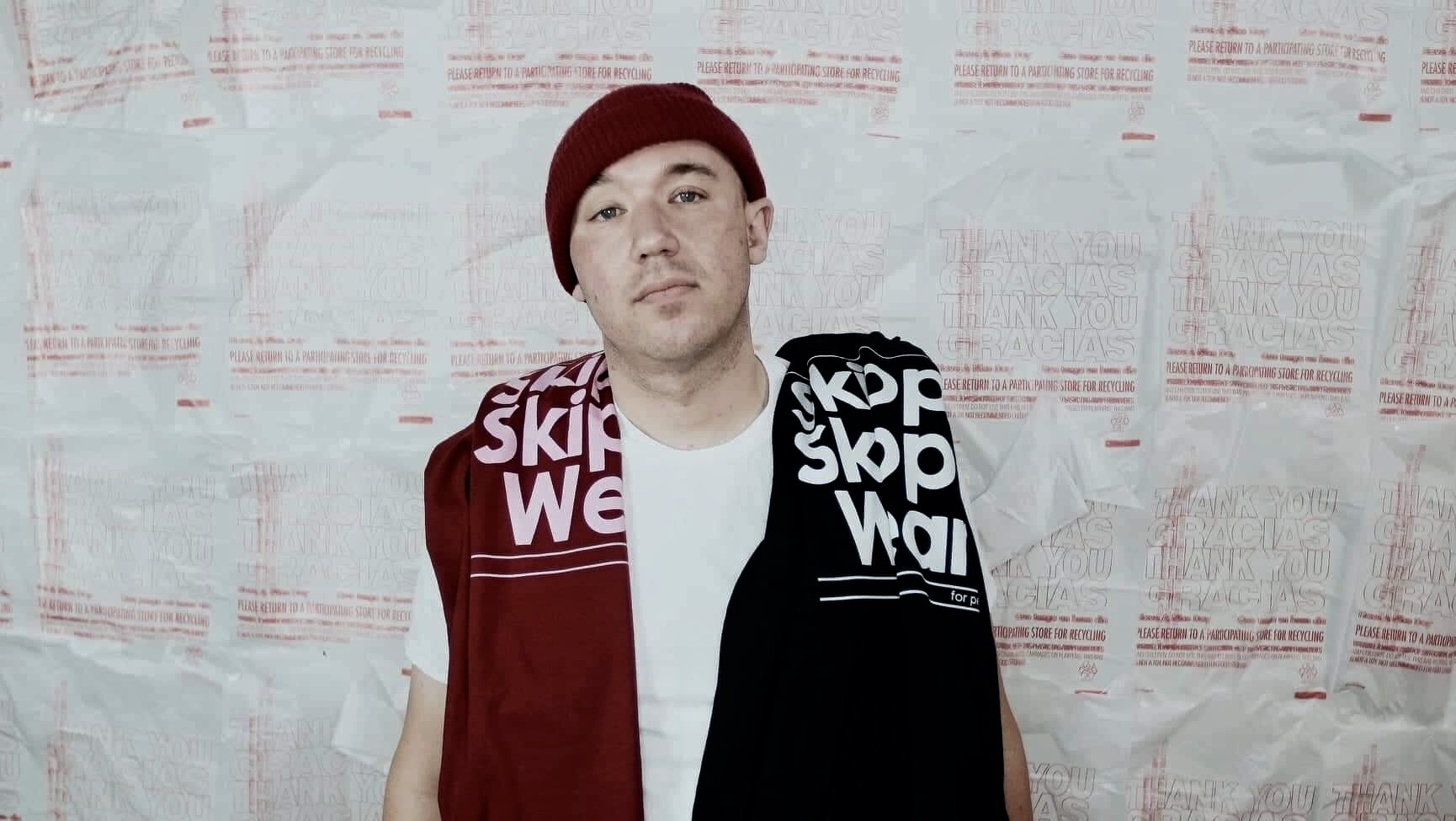
- Skipp Whitman

Background information
- Born: Brookline, Massachusetts, United States
- Origin: Boston, Massachusetts, United States
- Genres: Hip hop
- Occupation: Rapper
- Instruments: Vocals, Keyboards, Synth, Production
- Years active: 2007 – present
- Website: skippw.com

Skipp Whitman is a hip-hop artist from Brookline, Massachusetts, USA. He has released six self-produced albums, which include Piece, Girls, Whitman Can't Jump, Free Agent, Skipp City, and 5am, along with multiple Mixtapes which include 'Whitman Fiasco,' and 'Clean,' and 'Unfinished Songs' vols. 1–4, along with an EP, produced by Jeremy Page called 'Elevator Music' which is approaching the 1M mark on Spotify.

Whitman has opened for Kanye West when West was on tour promoting The College Dropout. He has also opened for KRS, Talib Kweli, Kool G Rap, Nas and Guru.

Whitman describes his music as, “autobiographic, reminiscent and honest to a fault”. In Skipp City, he self-produced the album with samples from “Amazing Grace” and “Destination Unknown”.

His first self-produced CD was “Mention The Eye, Out to Breakfast” in 2005. A self-produced mix tape called “Skipp Whitman vs. Richard Pryor” was released in 2009.

Whitman grew up in an upper-middle-class neighborhood town to artist parents. He describes himself as “fierce, stubborn and independent”. Whitman has real estate licenses in Massachusetts, New York, and California, where he has worked selling real estate

== Skipp Whitman vs. Richard Pryor mix tape ==
In 2009, a mix tape called “Skipp Whitman vs. Richard Pryor” was reworked after complaints from Richard Pryor's ex-wife over the unauthorized use of samples from Pryor's stand-up performances. The mix tape was later released as a “Clean” version.

== Discography ==
Album: Free Agent (2007)
Mix tape: Skipp Whitman vs. Richard Pryor (2009)
Mix tape: The Whitman Fiasco (2009)
Album: Skipp City (2011)
Album: 5am (2012)
Album: Whitman Can't Jump (2014)
Album: Piece (2017)
Album: Girls (2018)
MixTape: UFSV#1 (2018)
Mixtape: UFSV#2 (2018)
Mixtape: UFSV#3 (2019)
Mixtape: UFSV#4 (2019)
Ep: Elevator Music (2019)
