= Costas Ferris =

Greek film director

- Born: 18 April 1935 (age 91); Cairo, Kingdom of Egypt
- Occupations: Producer; film director; television director; playwright; screenwriter; composer; author; actor; journalist
- Years active: 1961–present

Costas Ferris (Greek: Κώστας Φέρρης; born 18 April 1935) is a Greek film director, writer, actor, and producer. He wrote the lyrics of Aphrodite's Child's album 666. His 1983 film Rembetiko won the Silver Bear at the 34th Berlin International Film Festival.

== Memberships and associations ==
- European Film Academy, member
- Balkan Film Festival, president of the jury, 1981
- Alexandria International Film Festival, president of the jury, 1996
- European Script Fund, member of the board, London, 1996-1997
- Greek Directors Society, member of the board, (multiple years)
- Greek Playwright Society, member
- Société des Auteurs, Compositeurs et Éditeurs de Musique (SACEM)
- Federation of European Film Directors (La Fédération Européenne des Réalisateurs de l'Audiovisuel [FERA]), Member, Greece

== Filmography ==
Year	Title	Role	Notes
1960	The River	Assistant Director	
1961	Ta Matoklada Sou Lampoun	Producer, Director, Editor	(Short film); Your Eyelashes are Sparkling
1963	Enas Delicanis	Technical Assistant Director	Crazy Blood
1964	Male Hunt	Assistant Director	
1964	The Moon-Spinners	Second Assistant Director	
1965	Merikes To Protimoun Khaki	Director, Screenwriter	Some Girls Like It In Khaki
1966	Devil at My Heels	Assistant Director, Actor	
1967	The Day the Fish Came Out	Assistant Director	
1967	Tu imagines Robinson	Assistant Director	
1968	Kierion	Actor	
1971	Le Sang	Screenwriter	
1971	Love Is Gay, Love Is Sad	Second Assistant Director	
1973	To mavro fengari	Editor, Cinematographer	(Short film)
1974	I Fonissa	Director, Screenwriter	The Murderess
1975	Promitheas Se Theftero Prosopo	Director, Screenwriter, Actor	Prometheus In the Second Person
1976	Opus 18 - Dokimi	Director, Writer	(Short film)
1978	Dyo fengaria ton Avgousto	Director, Screenwriter, Actor	Double Moon In August
1979	Exoristos Stin Kentriki Leoforo	Producer, Screenwriter, Actor, Editor, Composer	Exile On Main Avenue
1981	Barbecue Them!	Actor	
1983	Rembetiko	Producer, Director, Screenwriter	
1984	Loaf and Camouflage	Actor	
1985	I gynekes sti glastra	Editor	(Short film)
1987	Made in Greece	Actor	
1989	Oh Babylon	Director, Editor, Screenwriter	
2000	Women's Vices	Actor	
2002	Ariadni	Actor	

== Television documentaries and series ==
Year	Title	Role	Notes
1964	Bassae	First Assistant Director	
1973	I empori ton ethnon	Director	Lyrics for: "Itane mia fora"
1973-1974	The Merchants Of the Nations	Director	
1975	Violet City	Director	
1975-1978	Backstage	Director	
1975	Thessaloniki	Director	
1976	In Macedonia	Director	
1976	Helen Of The Donkeys	Director	
1977	From Improvisation To 3 Minutes	Director	
1978	Xenakis Polytopon	Director, Screenwriter	
1978	Erotas ke epanastasi	Director	
1978	Love and Revolution	Director	
1979	Murder In Psychico	Director	
1979	Elliniko ke xeno monoprakto	Director	
1982	The Zardi Family	Director, Screenwriter	
1984-1985	Artistic Cafe	Host	
1985	Tsitsanis	Director	
1985	Apodrasi	Director	Escape
1985	Rembetiko	Director	Mini-series version of Feature Film
1986	Crucifixion-Resurrection	Director, Screenwriter	
1990	Rock Around the Films	Director, Screenwriter	
1992	Klak - The Dictionary Of Greek Cinema	Director	
1992	Signs Of the Times	Director	
1994	I dikigori tis Athinas	Writer	
1995	San paramythi	Director, Writer	
1995	The Lawyers Of Athens	Screenwriter	
1997	The Kety Grey Story	Director, Screenwriter	
2001	Films and Music	Host, Screenwriter	
2008	Onirou Ellas	Director, Writer	
2008	I zoi ke to ergo tou Mimi Plessa	Featured	

== Discography ==
Year	Title	Artist	Role	Collaboration	Notes
1971	666	Aphrodite's Child	Lyrics, Concept	X	
1973	Akritas	Akritas	Lyrics, Concept	X	With Stavros Logaridis and Aris Tassoulis
TBD	Prossechos	Stavros Logaridis	Lyrics	X	
1982	The Zardi Family	Stavros Logaridis	Lyrics	X	
1984	Rembetiko	Stavros Xarhakos	Lyrics	X	
1985	Apodrassi	Thesia Panayiotou	Lyrics	X	
TBD	Oh Babylon	Thesia Panayiotou	Lyrics	X	
TBD	Come To Thomas	Thesia Panayiotou	Lyrics	X	
TBD	Oniric Hellas	Thesia Panayiotou	Lyrics	X	
TBD	The Rembetiko At Thomas' Den	Thesia Panayiotou	Lyrics	X	
TBD	Café-Aman (Live)	TBD	Lyrics	X	
1999	Rembetiko, The Musical	Thesia Panayiotou	Lyrics	X	

== Awards and nominations ==
Thessaloniki Film Festival

- 1974: Greek Competition Award (Best Director) (The Murderess, Won)
- 1978: Hellenic Association of Film Critics Award (Dyo Fengaria Ton Avgousto, Honorable Mention)
- 1978: Greek Competition Award (Best Film) (Dyo Fengaria Ton Avgousto, Third Place)
- 1983: Greek Competition Award (Best Film) (Rembetiko, Won)

Berlin International Film Festival

- 1984: Silver Berlin Bear (Rembetiko, Won)
- 1984: Golden Berlin Bear (Rembetiko, Nominated)

Alexandria International Film Festival

- 1984: Grand Prix (Rembetiko, Won)

Valencia Film Festival

- 1984: Special Jury Award (Rembetiko, Won)
