= Loukas Sideras =

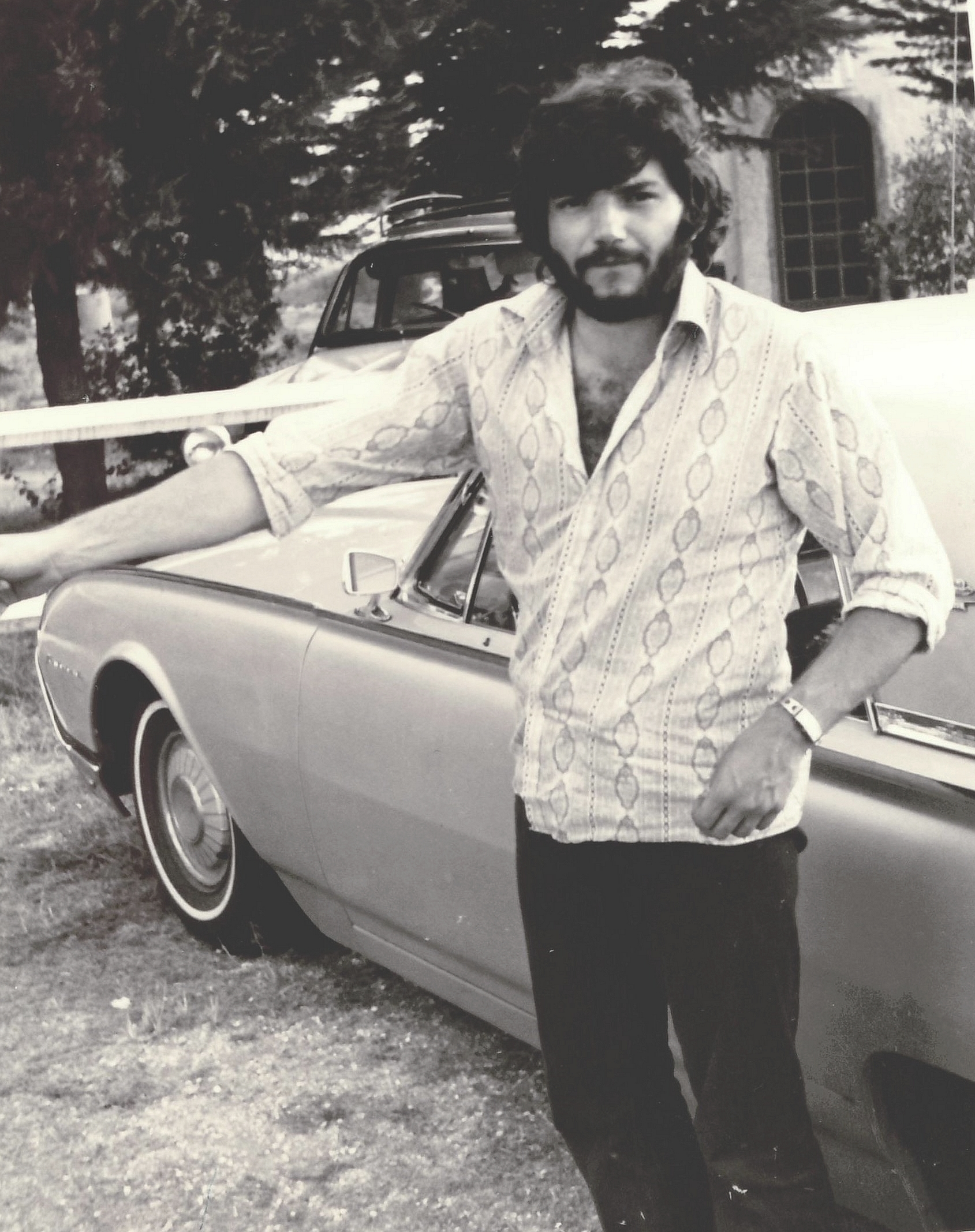
- Sideras in 1969

Background information
- Born: 5 December 1944 (age 80) Athens, Kingdom of Greece
- Genres: Progressive rock
- Instrument: Drums
- Formerly of: Aphrodite's Child

Loukas Sideras (Greek: Λουκάς Σιδεράς; born 5 December 1944) is the former drummer of the Greek progressive rock band Aphrodite's Child.
