= Demis Roussos discography =

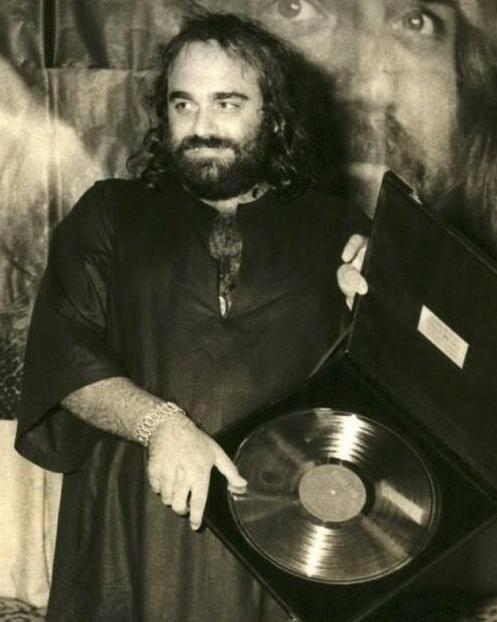
- Studio albums: 29
- EPs: 16
- Live albums: 4
- Compilation albums: 29
- Singles: 69
- Foreign-language singles: 53

Demis Roussos was a prolific Greek singer, songwriter and musician who sang in a number of languages and during the course of his career released 29 studio albums, 16 EPs and over 120 singles.

Roussos professional career began in 1963 and he was a member of rock band Aphrodite's Child in 1967 before launching a solo career in 1971.

== Albums ==
=== Studio albums ===
Title	Album details	Peak chart positions										Certifications
Title	Album details	AUS	BEL (WA)	FIN	FRA	GER	NL	NOR	SPA	SWE	UK	Certifications
On the Greek Side of My Mind (a.k.a. Fire and Ice)	Released: 29 September 1971; Label: Philips; Formats: LP, MC; English language	—	—	12 (Note: Charted upon release in 1974.)	—	—	—	—	11	—	—	FRA: Gold; UK: Silver
Forever and Ever	Released: March 1973; Label: Philips; Formats: LP, MC, 8-track; English language	11	—	1	2	1	1	1	2	1	2 (Note: Chart peak in 1976.)	FIN: Gold; FRA: Gold; GRE: Platinum; NL: Platinum; SPA: Gold; SWE: Diamond; UK: Platinum
My Only Fascination	Released: 2 April 1974; Label: Philips; Formats: LP, MC, 8-track; English language	—	—	1	3	—	—	6	2	7	39	FIN: Gold; FRA: Gold; SWE: Gold; UK: Gold
Auf Wiedersehn	Released: September 1974; Label: Philips; Formats: LP, MC, 8-track; German language	—	—	7	—	—	7	—	—	—	—	
Souvenirs	Released: 5 March 1975; Label: Philips; Formats: LP, MC, 8-track; English language	—	—	22	—	—	13	2	8	4	25	FRA: Gold; UK: Gold
Happy to Be...	Released: 24 March 1976; Label: Philips; Formats: LP, MC, 8-track; English language	57	—	—	7	—	—	—	30	23	4	UK: Silver
Die Nacht und der Wein	Released: 1 April 1976; Label: Philips; Formats: LP, MC; German language	—	—	—	—	34	—	—	—	—	—	
Kyrila – Insel der Träume	Released: January 1977; Label: Philips; Formats: LP, MC; German language	—	—	—	—	36	—	—	—	—	—	
The Demis Roussos Magic	Released: March 1977; Label: Philips; Formats: LP, MC, 8-track; English language	—	—	—	5	—	—	—	8	—	29	FRA: Gold; UK: Silver
Ainsi soit-il	Released: 1 November 1977; Label: Philips; Formats: LP, MC, 8-track; French language	—	—	—	6	—	—	—	—	—	—	FRA: Platinum
Demis Roussos	Released: 17 April 1978; Label: Philips; Formats: LP, MC, 8-track; English language	—	—	—	—	—	—	—	—	—	—	
Universum	Released: 3 April 1979; Label: Philips; Formats: LP, MC, 8-track; Released in several language versions	—	—	—	18	—	—	—	25	—	—	FRA: Gold; SPA: Platinum
Man of the World	Released: 9 May 1980; Label: Philips, Mercury; Formats: LP, MC; English language	—	—	—	—	—	36	—	—	—	—	
Demis	Released: 1 February 1982; Label: Mercury; Formats: LP, MC; Released in several language versions	—	—	—	—	—	—	—	—	—	—	
Attitudes	Released: 26 November 1982; Label: Mercury; Formats: LP, MC; English language	44	—	—	—	—	—	—	—	—	—	
Reflection	Released: 25 January 1984; Label: Mercury; Formats: LP, MC; English language	29	—	—	—	—	—	—	—	—	—	
Senza tempo	Released: 1985; Label: Five; Formats: LP, MC; English language	—	—	—	—	—	—	—	—	—	—	
Greater Love	Released: 1 September 1986; Label: BR Music; Formats: CD, LP, MC; English language	—	—	—	—	—	—	—	—	—	—	
Come All Ye Faithful (a.k.a. Glory – The Christmas Album)	Released: November 1987; Label: BR Music, Mercury; Formats: CD, LP, MC; Multilingual	—	—	—	—	—	—	—	—	—	—	
Le Grec	Released: 1 August 1988; Label: Flarenasch; Formats: CD, LP, MC; French and English language	—	—	—	22	—	—	—	—	—	—	FRA: Gold
Time	Released: October 1988; Label: EMI; Formats: CD, LP, MC; English language	—	—	—	—	—	79	—	—	36	—	
Voice and Vision	Released: 8 November 1989; Label: EMI; Formats: CD, LP, MC; Multilingual	—	—	—	36	—	—	—	—	—	—	FRA: Gold
Insight (a.k.a. Adagio, Too Many Dreams and Morning Has Broken)	Released: 22 February 1993; Label: Mad in France, Music de Luxe; Formats: CD, LP, MC; Multilingual	—	—	—	—	—	—	—	—	—	—	
Demis Roussos in Holland	Released: 15 March 1995; Label: BR Music; Formats: CD; Multilingual	—	—	—	—	—	—	—	—	—	—	
Immortel	Released: 26 May 1995; Label: Arcade; Formats: CD, MC; French language	—	31	—	16	—	—	—	—	—	—	
Serenade	Released: 1996; Label: Arcade; Formats: CD, MC; Italian and English language	—	—	—	—	—	—	—	—	—	—	
Mon île	Released: 29 September 1997; Label: BMG/RCA Victor; Formats: CD, MC; French language	—	—	—	—	—	—	—	—	—	—	
Auf meinen Wegen	Released: 21 August 2000; Label: BMG/Ariola; Formats: CD; Multilingual	—	—	—	—	—	—	—	—	—	—	
Demis	Released: 11 May 2009; Label: Discograph; Formats: CD, 2xLP; English language	—	35	—	18	—	—	—	—	—	—	
"—" denotes releases that did not chart or were not released in that territory.

=== Live albums ===
Title	Album details	Peak chart positions
Title	Album details	AUS
Roussos Live! Demis Roussos at the Sidney Opera House	Released: 1 February 1980 (Recording Date: Late 1979); Label: Philips; Formats: LP, MC	69
Demis Roussos at Diogenis Palace	Released: 1990; Label: EMI; Formats: LP, MC	—
Double Live	Released: 1999 (Royal Albert Hall - December 30, 1974 and Sydney Opera House - November 11, 1979); Label: BR Music; Formats: 2xCD	—
Live in Brazil	Released: 2006 (Recorded Live at Estaçaõ Embratel Convention Centre, Curtiba, PR, Brazil on 11 October, 2005); Label: Vidisco; Formats: 2xCD	—
"—" denotes releases that did not chart or were not released in that territory.

=== Compilation albums ===
Title	Album details	Peak chart positions											Certifications
Title	Album details	AUS	BEL (FLA)	BEL (WA)	FIN	FRA	GER	NL	NOR	SPA	SWE	UK	Certifications
Greatest Hits	Released: January 1974; Label: Philips; Formats: LP, MC; Continental Europe release	—	—	—	19	—	—	3	—	—	—	—	
Demis Roussos	Released: January 1975; Label: Big Tree; Formats: LP, 8-track; US release	—	—	—	—	—	—	—	—	—	—	—	
Golden Hits	Released: 1975; Label: Philips; Formats: LP, MC	—	—	—	—	—	—	—	13	—	19	—	
Los Super LP	Released: 1977; Label: Philips; Formats: 2xLP, MC; Spain release	—	—	—	—	—	—	—	—	6	—	—	
Demis Roussos canta en español (a.k.a. Demis Roussos en castellano and Sus grandes éxitos en español)	Released: August 1978; Label: Philips, Atlas; Formats: LP, MC; Continental Europe, US and Latin America release	—	—	—	—	—	—	—	—	—	—	—	
Life & Love	Released: October 1978; Label: Philips; Formats: LP, MC; UK, Greece and South Africa release	—	—	—	—	—	—	—	—	—	—	29	UK: Silver
The Roussos Phenomenon	Released: 1979; Label: Philips; Formats: LP, MC; Australasia and Japan release	25	—	—	—	—	—	—	—	—	—	—	NZ: Platinum
Insel der Zärtlichkeit – Demis Roussos und seine 20 Welterfolge	Released: March 1980; Label: Polystar; Formats: LP, MC; Germany and Austria release	—	—	—	—	—	2	—	—	—	—	—	GER: Gold
Souvenirs – Zijn 16 grootste hits	Released: July 1982; Label: Polydor; Formats: LP, MC; Netherlands release	—	—	—	—	—	—	8	—	—	—	—	
The Very Best of Demis Roussos	Released: 1982; Label: Hammard; Formats: LP, MC; Australia release	40	—	—	—	—	—	—	—	—	—	—	
The Story of Demis Roussos	Released: May 1987; Label: EVA; Formats: CD, 2xLP, MC; Continental Europe and Brazil release	—	—	—	—	—	—	16	—	—	—	—	NL: Gold
The Best of Demis Roussos	Released: 1988; Label: Flarenasch; Formats: CD, LP, MC; France, Belgium and Canada release	—	—	—	—	—	—	—	—	—	—	—	
Christmas with Demis Roussos	Released: 1991; Label: Arcade; Formats: CD, LP, MC; Continental Europe release; Also released in French as Chante Noël	—	—	—	—	28	—	—	—	—	—	—	FRA: Gold
Seine größten Erfolge	Released: April 1992; Label: Arcade; Formats: CD, LP, MC; Continental Europe release	—	—	—	—	—	—	—	—	—	—	—	
Love in Lost	Released: May 1993; Label: Spectrum Music; Formats: CD, MC; Europe, Australia and South Africa release	—	—	—	—	—	—	—	—	—	—	—	
Back to Back – The Best of Vicky Leandros & Demis Roussos (split album with Vicky Leandros)	Released: November 1995; Label: Mercury; Formats: CD; Benelux release	—	19	—	—	—	—	—	—	—	—	—	
De beste sanger	Released: 1998; Label: Philips; Formats: CD; Norway release	—	—	—	—	—	—	—	2	—	—	—	
The Phenomenon 1968–1998 (a.k.a. Forever and Ever – 40 Greatest Hits)	Released: September 1998; Label: Mercury; Formats: 2xCD, 4xCD; Continental Europe, Mexico and South Africa release	—	44	—	—	64 (Note: Chart peak in 2015.)	—	25	—	—	—	—	
Classic Demis Roussos	Released: 1999; Label: Mercury/Universal Music; Formats: CD; Europe and Latin America release	—	—	—	—	—	—	—	—	82 (Note: Chart peak in 2008.)	—	—	
Lo mejor de Demis Roussos en español	Released: 2000; Label: Universal Music; Formats: 2xCD; Spain and Latin America release	—	—	—	—	—	—	—	—	11	—	—	SPA: Gold
The Very Best of Demis Roussos	Released: 2001; Label: Mercury; Formats: CD; Sweden release	—	—	—	—	—	—	—	—	—	13	—	
Forever and Ever – Definitive Collection	Released: March 2002; Label: Philips; Formats: CD; UK release	—	—	—	—	—	—	—	—	—	—	17	
The Very Best Of	Released: 2005; Label: Som Livre/Vidisco; Formats: CD; Portugal release	—	—	—	—	—	—	—	—	—	—	—	
The Universal Master Collection	Released: 2006; Label: Universal Music; Formats: CD; Europe release	—	—	—	—	61 (Note: Chart peak in 2015.)	—	—	—	—	—	—	
Songs from an Island in the Sun	Released: July 2009; Label: Universal Music; Formats: CD; Norway release	—	—	—	—	—	—	—	3	—	—	—	
Top 100	Released: September 2009; Label: BR Music/Universal Music; Formats: 5xCD; Netherlands release	—	—	—	—	—	—	41	—	—	—	—	
Forever & Ever – The Best Of	Released: 18 February 2013; Label: Spectrum Music; Formats: CD; UK release	—	—	—	—	—	—	—	—	—	—	—	
Collected	Released: 27 March 2015; Label: Universal Music; Formats: 3xCD; Europe release	—	1	3	—	92	—	52	—	—	—	—	
Complete 28 Original Albums + Dvd Journey with My Father	Released: 17 June 2016; Label: Universal Music; Formats: 28xCD+DVD box set; Europe release	—	—	—	—	—	—	—	—	—	—	—	
"—" denotes releases that did not chart or were not released in that territory.

== EPs ==
Title	EP details	Peak chart positions	Certifications
Title	EP details	UK	Certifications
Fire and Ice	Released: 1972; Label: Philips; Formats: 7"; Brazil release	—	
Mi razón	Released: 1973; Label: Philips; Formats: 7"; Mexico release	—	
Eternamente (Por siempre y para siempre)	Released: 1973; Label: Philips; Formats: 7"; Mexico release	—	
My Friend the Wind	Released: 1973; Label: Philips; Formats: 7"; Brazil release	—	
Sus grandes éxitos	Released: 1973; Label: Philips; Formats: 7"; Argentina release	—	
Forever and Ever / Velvet Mornings	Released: January 1974; Label: Philips; Formats: 7"; Bolivia release	—	
Disco de ouro	Released: 1974; Label: Philips; Formats: 7"; Portugal and Mozambique release	—	
Algún día, en algún lugar	Released: 1974; Label: Philips; Formats: 7"; Mexico release	—	
Smile	Released: 1974; Label: Philips; Formats: 7"; Brazil release	—	
My Only Fascination	Released: August 1974; Label: Philips; Formats: 7"; Bolivia release	—	
Contigo	Released: 1975; Label: Philips; Formats: 7"; Mexico release	—	
Souvenirs	Released: 1975; Label: Philips; Formats: 7"; Brazil release	—	
Excerpts from "The Roussos Phenomenon"	Released: June 1976; Label: Philips; Formats: 7"; Europe and Australasia release	1	UK: Silver
4 éxitos de oro	Released: November 1976; Label: Philips; Formats: 7"; Bolivia release	—	
Kyrila	Released: May 1977; Label: Philips; Formats: 7"; UK, Ireland and South Africa release	33	
"Ainsi soit-il"	Released: 1977; Label: Philips; Formats: 7"; Bolivia release	—	
"—" denotes releases that did not chart or were not released in that territory.

== Singles ==
Title	Year	Peak chart positions										Album
Title	Year	AUT	BEL (FLA)	BEL (WA)	FIN	FRA	GER	NL	SPA	UK	US	Album
"We Shall Dance"	1971	—	9	13	—	6	29	4	3	—	—	On the Greek Side of My Mind
"Fire and Ice" (Note: "Fire and Ice" was only released as a single in Continental Europe.)	1971	—	—	47	—	—	—	—	—	—	—	On the Greek Side of My Mind
"No Way Out" (Note: "No Way Out" was only released as a single in Continental Europe and South America.)	1972	—	—	45	—	—	—	—	18	—	—	Forever and Ever
"My Reason"	1972	—	2	1	—	4	—	1	—	—	—	Forever and Ever
"When I'm a Kid" (Note: "When I Am a Kid" was released as the B-side to "My Reason" in the majority of territories, It was released as an A-side single in Spain, Germany and South America.)	1972	—	—	—	—	—	—	—	2	—	—	Forever and Ever
"Velvet Mornings" (Note: "Velvet Mornings" was only released as a single in Brazil, Argentina, Japan. It was also released as the flip side to "Forever and Ever" in a number of territories.)	1972	—	—	—	—	—	—	—	—	—	—	Forever and Ever
"Auntie" (with Hildegard Knef, Enrico Macias, Alice Babs, Sandra & Andres, and Vicky Leandros) (Note: "Auntie" was only released as a single in Continental Europe and Turkey.)	1972	—	—	—	—	—	—	4	—	—	—	Non-album single
"Forever and Ever"	1973	4	1	1	6	2	26	2	1	—	—	Forever and Ever
"Goodbye, My Love, Goodbye"	1973	—	1	1	—	3	—	2	1	—	—	Forever and Ever
"My Friend the Wind"	1973	15	1	2	—	—	7	1	—	—	—	Forever and Ever
"Someday Somewhere"	1973	18	1	7	—	20	—	2	1	—	—	My Only Fascination
"My Only Fascination"	1974	—	11	4	6	9	—	11	—	—	—	My Only Fascination
"A Flower's All You Need" (with Ennio Morricone) (Note: "A Flower's All You Need" was only released as a single in Japan.)	1974	—	—	—	—	—	—	—	—	—	—	Non-album single
"Lovely Lady of Arcadia"	1974	—	—	—	—	—	—	—	6	—	—	My Only Fascination
"With You"	1974	—	18	6	12	—	—	—	—	—	—	Non-album single
"From Souvenirs to Souvenirs"	1975	—	—	13	—	16	—	—	—	—	—	Souvenirs
"Midnight Is the Time I Need You" (Note: "Midnight Is the Time I Need You" was only released as single in the UK, Ireland, US and Italy.)	1975	—	—	—	—	—	—	—	—	—	—	Souvenirs
"Sing an Ode to Love" (Note: "Sing an Ode to Love" was only released as a single in Benelux.)	1975	—	—	—	—	—	—	—	—	—	—	Souvenirs
"Perdoname"	1975	—	5	24	—	—	—	6	7	—	—	Souvenirs
"Happy to Be on an Island in the Sun"	1975	—	—	—	—	—	—	—	—	5	—	Happy to Be...
"So Dreamy"	1975	—	—	35	—	—	—	—	29	—	—	Happy to Be...
"Can't Say How Much I Love You"	1976	—	—	38	—	—	—	—	—	35	—	Happy to Be...
"Far Away" (Note: "Far Away" was only released as a single in France.)	1976	—	—	—	—	—	—	—	—	—	—	Happy to Be...
"Never Say Good-Bye Again" (Note: "Never Say Good-Bye Again" was only released as a single in France, Canada, Portugal and Madagascar.)	1976	—	—	39	—	—	—	—	—	—	—	Non-album single
"When Forever Has Gone" (Note: "When Forever Has Gone" was only released as a single in the UK, Germany, Scandinavia and Australia.)	1976	—	—	—	—	—	—	—	—	2	—	The Demis Roussos Magic
"Maybe Someday"	1976	—	—	—	—	—	—	—	—	—	—	Non-album single
"Because"	1977	—	—	—	—	—	—	—	—	39	—	The Demis Roussos Magic
"Day-O" (Note: "Day-O" was only released as a single in Turkey.)	1977	—	—	—	—	—	—	—	—	—	—	The Demis Roussos Magic
"Life in the City" (Note: "Life in the City" was only released as a single in Europe and Australia.)	1978	—	—	—	—	—	—	—	—	—	—	Demis Roussos
"That Once in a Lifetime" (Note: "That Once in a Lifetime" was only released as a single in North America, Brazil and Japan.)	1978	—	—	—	—	—	—	—	—	—	47	Demis Roussos
"L.O.V.E. Got a Hold of Me" (Note: "L.O.V.E. Got a Hold of Me" was only released a single in the US and Canada.)	1978	—	—	—	—	—	—	—	—	—	— (Note: "L.O.V.E. Got a Hold of Me" did not enter the Billboard Hot 100, but did peak at number 26 on the National Disco Action Top 40.)	Demis Roussos
"Lost in Love" (featuring Florence Warner)	1980	—	3	—	—	—	—	4	—	—	—	Man of the World
"Sorry" (Note: "Sorry" was only released as a single in the UK and Spain.)	1980	—	—	—	—	—	—	—	—	—	—	Man of the World
"I Need You"	1980	—	—	—	—	—	—	—	—	—	—	Man of the World
"San Pedros Children" (Note: "San Pedros Children" was only released as a single in Germany and Spain.)	1980	—	—	—	—	—	—	—	—	—	—	Man of the World
"Race to the End"	1981	—	—	—	—	—	—	—	—	—	—	Demis
"Lament" (Note: "Lament" was only released as a single in Europe, Australasia and South Africa.)	1982	—	—	—	—	—	—	—	—	—	—	Demis
"Gypsy Lady" (Note: "Gypsy Lady" was only released as a single in Portugal.)	1982	—	—	—	—	—	—	—	—	—	—	Demis
"Follow Me" (Note: "Follow Me" was only released as a single in Europe and Australia.)	1982	—	32	—	—	—	—	27	—	—	—	Attitudes
"Planet Earth Is Blue" (Note: "Planet Earth Is Blue" was only released as a single in Japan.)	1982	—	—	—	—	—	—	—	—	—	—	Attitudes
"Jay" (Note: "Jay" was only released as a single in Europe.)	1983	—	—	—	—	—	—	—	—	—	—	Non-album single
"When a Man Loves a Woman" (Note: "When a Man Loves a Woman" was only released as a single in Canada.)	1984	—	—	—	—	—	—	—	—	—	—	Reflection
"Love Me Tender" (Note: "Love Me Tender" was only released as a single in the UK and France.)	1984	—	—	—	—	—	—	—	—	—	—	Reflection
"Stand by Me" (Note: "Stand by Me" was only released as a single in Spain and Australia.)	1984	—	—	—	—	—	—	—	—	—	—	Reflection
"Anytime at All" (Note: "Anytime at All" was only released as a single in Italy.)	1985	—	—	—	—	—	—	—	—	—	—	Senza tempo
"Island of Love" (Note: "Island of Love" was only released as a single in the Netherlands and France.)	1986	—	—	—	—	—	—	28	—	—	—	Greater Love
"Summerwine" (with Nancy Boyd) (Note: "Summerwine" was only released as a single in the Netherlands.)	1986	—	—	—	—	—	—	44	—	—	—	Greater Love
"Summer in Her Eyes" (Note: "Summer in Her Eyes" was only released as a single in the UK, Benelux and Germany.)	1986	—	—	—	—	—	—	32	—	—	—	Greater Love
"Tropicana Bay" (with Nancy Boyd) (Note: "Tropicana Bay" was only released as a single in the Netherlands.)	1986	—	—	—	—	—	—	—	—	—	—	Greater Love
"Rain and Tears" (live) (Note: The live version of "Rain and Tears" was only released as a single in the Netherlands and Switzerland.)	1987	—	—	—	—	—	—	60	—	—	—	The Story of Demis Roussos
"My Friend the Wind" (live) (Note: The live version of "My Friend the Wind" was only released as a single in the Netherlands.)	1987	—	—	—	—	—	—	—	—	—	—	The Story of Demis Roussos
"We Shall Dance" (live) (Note: The live version of "We Shall Dance" was only released as single in the Netherlands.)	1987	—	—	—	—	—	—	—	—	—	—	The Story of Demis Roussos
"Marie Jolie" (live) (Note: "Marie Jolie" was only released as a single in the Netherlands.)	1987	—	—	—	—	—	—	—	—	—	—	The Story of Demis Roussos
"It's Five O'Clock" (Note: "It's Five O'Clock" was only released as a single in the Netherlands,)	1987	—	—	—	—	—	—	—	—	—	—	The Story of Demis Roussos
"I Want to Live" (Note: "I Want to Live" was only released as a single in the Netherlands.)	1987	—	—	—	—	—	—	—	—	—	—	The Story of Demis Roussos
"What Child This Is" (Note: "What Child This Is" was only released as a single in the Netherlands.)	1987	—	—	—	—	—	—	—	—	—	—	Come All Ye Faithful
"Silent Night" (Note: "Silent Night" was only released as a single in the Netherlands.)	1987	—	—	—	—	—	—	—	—	—	—	Come All Ye Faithful
"Time"	1988	—	—	—	29	—	—	57	—	—	—	Time
"My Song of Love" (Note: "My Song of Love" was only released as a single in Europe.)	1988	—	—	—	—	—	—	—	—	—	—	Time
"Dance of Love" (Note: "Dance of Love" was only released as a single in Europe.)	1989	—	—	—	—	—	—	—	—	—	—	Time
"Mamy Blue" (Note: "Mamy Blue" was only released as a single in the Netherlands and Spain.)	1989	—	—	—	—	—	—	—	—	—	—	Time
"Young Love" (with Drafi Deutscher) (Note: "Young Love" was only released as a single in Europe.)	1989	—	—	—	—	—	—	—	—	—	—	Voice and Vision
"Magdalena" (Note: "Magdalena" was only released as a single in Europe.)	1989	—	—	—	—	—	—	—	—	—	—	Voice and Vision
"Futureless Forever" (Note: "Futureless Forever" was only released as a single in France.)	1989	—	—	—	—	—	—	—	—	—	—	Voice and Vision
"Morning Has Broken" (Note: "Morning Has Broken" was only released as a single in Benelux.)	1993	—	—	—	—	—	—	—	—	—	—	Insight
"Eleni" (Note: "Eleni" was only released as a single in Benelux.)	1995	—	—	—	—	—	—	—	—	—	—	Demis Roussis in Holland
"On My Own" (with Rob de Nijs) (Note: "On My Own" was only released as a single in Benelux.)	1995	—	50	—	—	—	—	—	—	—	—	Demis Roussis in Holland
"Faraway" (with Hasna) (Note: "Faraway" was only released as a single in the Middle East.)	2001	—	—	—	—	—	—	—	—	—	—	Non-album single
"Love Is" (Note: "Love Is" was only released as a single in France.)	2009	—	—	—	—	—	—	—	—	—	—	Demis
"—" denotes releases that did not chart or were not released in that territory.

=== German-language singles ===
Title	Year	Peak chart positions								Album
Title	Year	AUT	BEL (FLA)	BEL (WA)	FIN	DEN	GER	NL	SWI	Album
"Goodbye, My Love, Goodbye"	1973	2	—	—	—	15	1	—	1	Non-album single
"Schönes Mädchen aus Arcadia"	1973	7	1	9	—	12	6	1	2	Auf Wiedersehn
"Deine Liebe wird mir fehlen"	1974	—	—	—	—	—	—	—	—	Auf Wiedersehn
"Auf Wiedersehn"	1974	—	19	—	21	—	—	6	—	Auf Wiedersehn
"Manuela"	1974	—	—	—	—	—	42	—	—	Auf Wiedersehn
"Schön wie Mona Lisa (Wenn ich ein Maler wär')"	1975	—	—	—	—	—	6	—	—	Die Nacht und der Wein
"Vagabund der Liebe"	1975	—	—	—	—	—	22	—	—	Die Nacht und der Wein
"Die Bouzouki, die Nacht und der Wein"	1976	—	—	—	—	—	43	—	—	Die Nacht und der Wein
"Komm in den Garten der tausend Melodien" ("Happy to Be on an Island in the Sun")	1976	—	—	—	—	—	—	—	—	Die Nacht und der Wein
"Die Nächte von Athen"	1976	—	—	—	—	—	—	—	—	Kyrila – Insel der Träume
"Kyrila"	1976	—	—	—	—	—	40	—	—	Kyrila – Insel der Träume
"Ich hätte dich heiraten sollen"	1977	—	—	—	—	—	—	—	—	Non-album single
"Kinder der ganzen Erde"	1979	—	—	—	—	—	—	—	—	Universum
"Romantica"	1979	—	—	—	—	—	—	—	—	Universum
"—" denotes releases that did not chart or were not released in that territory.

=== French-language singles ===
Title	Year	Peak chart positions					Album
Title	Year	BEL (FLA)	BEL (WA)	FRA	QUE	NL	Album
"Le peintre des étoiles"	1973	—	2	—	—	—	Non-album single
"Mourir auprès de mon amour" ("Because")	1977	26	2	4	1	—	Ainsi soit-il
"Ainsi soit-il"	1977	—	9	9	17	—	Ainsi soit-il
"Loin des yeux loin du cœur"	1978	—	—	8	6	—	Universum
"Chantez enfants du monde"	1979	—	—	24	7	—	Universum
"Longtemps je t'aimerai" ("The Wedding Song")	1979	—	—	27	1	—	Non-album singles
"Si j'étais roi de la terre"	1981	—	—	—	—	—	Non-album singles
"La course infinie" ("Race to the End")	1981	—	—	—	—	—	Demis
"Je t'aime mon amour" (with Vicky Leandros)	1981	—	—	—	—	41	Love Is Alive (Vicky Leandros album)
"Au nom de l'amitié" ("Lament")	1982	—	—	—	—	—	Demis
"Les enfants du futur" ("Song for the Free")	1982	—	—	—	5	—	Demis
"Amis pour la vie" ("Friends of a Lifetime")	1985	—	—	—	—	—	Greater Love
"Quand je t'aime"	1987	—	—	3	6	—	The Best of Demis Roussos
"Prier"	1988	—	—	46	—	—	Le Grec
"Le Grec"	1988	—	—	—	—	—	Le Grec
"Spleen"	1989	—	—	—	—	—	Le Grec
"On écrit sur les murs" ("Graffiti")	1989	—	—	4	36	—	Voice and Vision
"Même si (Petite fille)"	1990	—	—	—	—	—	Voice and Vision
"Poésie"	1990	—	—	—	—	—	Non-album single
"Tous les "je vous aime""	1993	—	—	—	—	—	Insight
"Dinata"	1997	—	—	—	—	—	Mon île
"—" denotes releases that did not chart or were not released in that territory.

=== Spanish-language singles ===
Title	Year	Peak chart positions	Album
Title	Year	SPA	Album
"Quisiera bailar esta canción" ("Happy to Be on an Island in the Sun")	1976	17	Non-album singles
"Bahía Blue"	1976	—	Non-album singles
"Morir al lado de mi amor" ("Because")	1977	4	The Demis Roussos Magic
"Esta canción" ("This Song")	1978	—	Demis Roussos
"Ojos que no ven" ("Loin des yeux loin du cœur")	1979	—	Universum
"Un mundo de hombres niños" ("Chantez enfants du monde")	1979	—	Universum
"Te necesito" ("I Need You")	1980	—	Man of the World
"Canción de boda" ("The Wedding Song")	1980	19	Man of the World
"Dama gitana" ("Gypsy Lady")	1982	—	Demis
"Tu libertad" ("Race to the End")	1982	—	Demis
"Mensajes de amor"	1990	—	Non-album single
"—" denotes releases that did not chart or were not released in that territory.

=== Italian-language singles ===
Title	Year	Peak chart positions	Album
Title	Year	ITA	Album
"Profeta non sarò" ("Because")	1977	4	Non-album singles
"E così sia" ("Ainsi soit-il")	1977	—	Non-album singles
"Dolce veleno" ("Loin des yeux loin du cœur")	1979	—	Universum
"Il tocco dell'amore" ("Sometimes When We Touch")	1979	—	Universum
"Credo" ("I Need You")	1980	—	Man of the World
"Viso di donna"	1989	—	Voice and Vision
"—" denotes releases that did not chart.

=== Portuguese-language singles ===
Title	Year	Album
"Você você e nada mais"	1977	Non-album single

== See also ==
- For the discography with the band Aphrodite's Child, see Aphrodite's Child discography.
