= The Phenomenon 1968–1998 =

Compilation album by Demis Roussos
- Released: 1998
- Label: BR Music

The Phenomenon 1968–1998 (also titled Forever and Ever – 40 Greatest Hits) is a double-CD greatest hits album by Greek singer Demis Roussos, released in 1998 on the label BR Music.

== Commercial performance ==
The album reached no. 25 in the Netherlands in 1998.

== Track listing ==
CD 1
No.	Title	Length
1.	"Rain and Tears" (*)	3:10
2.	"I Want to Live" (*)	3:30
3.	"Marie Jolie" (*)	4:47
4.	"It's Five O'Clock" (*)	3:29
5.	"Spring Summer Winter and Fall" (*)	4:57
6.	"Such a Funny Night" (*)	4:33
7.	"We Shall Dance"	3:33
8.	"No Way Out"	3:10
9.	"My Reason"	3:58
10.	"Forever and Ever"	3:38
11.	"Velvet Mornings"	3:37
12.	"Goodbye My Love Goodbye"	3:55
13.	"My Friend The Wind"	3:52
14.	"Schönes Mädchen Aus Arcadia"	3:20
15.	"Someday Somewhere"	3:03
16.	"My Only Fascination"	3:42
17.	"Auf Wiederseh'n"	3:33
18.	"With You"	3:22
19.	"When Forever Has Gone"	3:01
20.	"From Souvenirs to Souvenirs"	2:35
21.	"Perdoname"	2:59

CD 2
No.	Title	Length
1.	"Happy to Be on an Island in the Sun"	3:10
2.	"Kyrila"	3:36
3.	"Mourir auprès de mon amour"	4:17
4.	"Life In The City"	3:33
5.	"Loin aes yeux, loin du cœur"	3:05
6.	"Lost in Love"	3:31
7.	"Race to the End"	3:47
8.	"Lament"	3:09
9.	"Follow Me"	7:21
10.	"Island of Love"	3:43
11.	"Summer in Her Eyes"	4:05
12.	"Ave Maria"	5:12
13.	"Quand je t'aime"	3:52
14.	"Time"	4:16
15.	"On écrit sur les murs"	3:34
16.	"Eleni"	3:50
17.	"La mer"	7:11
18.	"Santa Lucia"	3:26
19.	"Bella Notte"	3:13

* Tracks 1–6 with Aphrodite's Child.

== Charts ==
The Phenomenon 1968–1998

Chart (1998)	Peak position
Dutch Albums (Album Top 100)	25
Chart (2015)	Peak position
French Albums (SNEP)	64

Forever and Ever – 40 Greatest Hits

Chart (1999)	Peak position
Belgian Albums (Ultratop Flanders)	44
