= Collected (Demis Roussos album) =

Compilation album by Demis Roussos
- Released: 2015
- Label: Universal Music Group

Collected is a triple-CD greatest hits album by Greek singer Demis Roussos, released in 2015 by Universal Music Group.

== Commercial performance ==
In Belgium the album reached no. 1 in Flanders (43 weeks on the chart) and no 3. in Wallonia (58 weeks on the chart).

== Track listing ==
CD 1
No.	Title	Artist(s)	Length
1.	"Rain and Tears"	Aphrodite's Child	3:14
2.	"End of the World"	Aphrodite's Child	3:15
3.	"I Want to Live"	Aphrodite's Child	3:53
4.	"Marie Jolie"	Aphrodite's Child	4:40
5.	"It's Five O'Clock"	Aphrodite's Child	3:31
6.	"Such a Funny Night"	Aphrodite's Child	4:33
7.	"Spring, Summer, Winter & Fall"	Aphrodite's Child	4:55
8.	"Babylon"	Aphrodite's Child	2:52
9.	"The Four Horsemen"	Aphrodite's Child	5:55
10.	"Hic et nunc"	Aphrodite's Child	2:55
11.	"We Shall Dance"		3:32
12.	"She Came Up From the North"		3:28
13.	"Good Days Have Gone"		3:46
14.	"I Know I'll Do It Again"		2:49
15.	"Fire and Ice"		4:35
16.	"My Blue Ship's A-sailin"		3:48
17.	"O My Friends You've Been Untrue to Me"		4:48
18.	"Ulysses"		11:55

CD 2
No.	Title	Artist(s)	Length
1.	"My Reason"		3:59
2.	"When I Am a Kid"		3:18
3.	"Forever and Ever"		3:39
4.	"Velvet Mornings"		3:39
5.	"Good Bye My Love Good Bye"		3:56
6.	"My Friend the Wind"		3:53
7.	"Lovely Lady of Arcadia"		3:25
8.	"Someday Somewhere"		3:05
9.	"My Only Fascination"		3:44
10.	"When Forever Has Gone"		3:02
11.	"From Souvenirs to Souvenirs"		2:36
12.	"Happy to Be on an Island in the Sun"		3:11
13.	"Far Away"		2:48
14.	"Mourir auprès de mon amour"		4:18
15.	"Lost in Love"	Demis Roussos feat. Florence Warner	3:23
16.	"Follow Me"		7:26
17.	"Island of Love"		3:45
18.	"Quand je t'aime"		3:47
19.	"On écrit sur les murs"		3:35

CD 3
No.	Title	Artists(s)	Length
1.	"A Flower's All You Need"		5:17
2.	"Margarita"		5:06
3.	"I Dig You"		4:09
4.	"Loving Arms"		2:51
5.	"Sometimes When We Touch" (Live at the Sydney Opera House)		3:48
6.	"If You Remember Me"		4:26
7.	"Man of the World" (Live at the Sydney Opera House)		2:37
8.	"Miss You Nights"		3:58
9.	"Race to the End"		3:44
10.	"Lament"		3:11
11.	"Love Me Tender"		4:14
12.	"Planet Earth Is Blue"		5:48
13.	"House of the Rising Sun"		7:53
14.	"Nature Boy"		4:25
15.	"Prier"		4:14
16.	"Mamy Blue"		4:12
17.	"On My Own"	Rob de Nijs & Demis Roussos	2:54
18.	"Una furtiva lagrima"		4:03

== Charts ==
=== Weekly charts ===
Chart (2015)	Peak position
Belgian Albums (Ultratop Flanders)	1
Belgian Albums (Ultratop Wallonia)	3
Dutch Albums (Album Top 100)	52
French Albums (SNEP)	92

=== Year-end charts ===
Chart (2015)	Position
Belgian Albums (Ultratop Flanders)	5
Belgian Albums (Ultratop Wallonia)	25

== See also ==
- List of number-one albums of 2015 (Belgium)
