= Insel der Zärtlichkeit =

Insel der Zärtlichkeit – Demis Roussos und seine 20 Welterfolge

Compilation album by Demis Roussos
- Released: 1980
- Label: Polystar / Phonogram GmbH

Insel der Zärtlichkeit – Demis Roussos und seine 20 Welterfolge is a greatest hits album by Greek singer Demis Roussos, released in 1980 by Polystar / Phonogram GmbH.

== Commercial performance ==
The album reached no. 1 in Austria (and spent a total of 26 weeks in the Austrian chart in 1980–1981) and no. 2 in Germany.

== Track listing ==
Side 1
No.	Title	Length
1.	"Romantica"	4:15
2.	"Schön wie Mona Lisa" ("Wenn ich ein Maler wär'")	3:59
3.	"Kyrila" ("Elongi")	3:36
4.	"We Shall Dance"	3:33
5.	"Die Nächte von Athen"	3:44
6.	"Velvet Mornings"	3:38
7.	"Vagabund der Liebe"	4:05
8.	"My Only Fascination"	3:41
9.	"Mein Leben ist ein Souvenir" ("From Souvenirs to Souvenirs")	3:35
10.	"Goodbye, My Love, Goodbye"	3:58

Side 2
No.	Title	Length
1.	"Forever and Ever"	3:42
2.	"Manuela"	3:35
3.	"Schönes Mädchen aus Arcadia"	3:25
4.	"My Friend the Wind"	3:55
5.	"Komm in den Garten der tausend Melodien"	3:15
6.	"Kinder der ganzen Erde"	5:05
7.	"Let It Be Me"	3:20
8.	"Die Bouzouki, die Nacht und der Wein"	3:40
9.	"Rain and Tears" (mit Aphrodite's Child)	3:08
10.	"Auf Wiedersehn"	3:35

== Charts ==
Chart (1980–1981)	Peak position
Austrian Albums (Ö3 Austria)	1
German Albums (Offizielle Top 100)	2

== Certifications ==
Region	Certification	Certified units/sales
Germany (BVMI)	Gold	250,000^{^}
^{^} Shipments figures based on certification alone.
