= Golden Hits (Demis Roussos album) =

Compilation album by Demis Roussos
- Released: 1975
- Label: Philips

Golden Hits is a greatest hits album by Greek singer Demis Roussos, released in 1975 on Philips Records.

== Commercial performance ==
The album reached no. 13 in Norway and no. 19 in Sweden.

== Track listing ==
LP Philips 6499 724 (Netherlands)

Side 1
| No. | Title | Length |
|---|---|---|
| 1. | "Forever and Ever" | 3:42 |
| 2. | "My Reason" | 4:03 |
| 3. | "Lovely Lady of Arcadia" | 3:20 |
| 4. | "We Shall Dance" | 3:33 |
| 5. | "With You" | 3:15 |
| 6. | "Good Bye My Love Good Bye" | 3:56 |

Side 2
| No. | Title | Length |
|---|---|---|
| 1. | "My Only Fascination" | 3:40 |
| 2. | "Someday Somewhere" | 3:00 |
| 3. | "When I Am a Kid" | 3:17 |
| 4. | "My Friend the Wind" | 3:55 |
| 5. | "Velvet Mornings" | 3:38 |
| 6. | "From Souvenirs to Souvenirs" | 2:47 |

== Charts ==
| Chart (1975–1976) | Peak position |
|---|---|
| Swedish Albums (Sverigetopplistan) | 19 |
| Norwegian Albums (VG-lista) | 13 |
