= Life & Love =

Compilation album by Demis Roussos
- Released: 1978
- Label: Philips

Life & Love (or Life & Love – His 20 Greatest Songs) is a greatest hits album by Greek singer Demis Roussos, released in 1978 on Philips Records.

== Commercial performance ==
The album spent 11 weeks in the UK albums chart, peaking at no. 29.

== Track listing ==
Side 1
No.	Title	Length
1.	"Forever and Ever"
2.	"From Souvenirs to Souvenirs"
3.	"My Only Fascination"
4.	"Let It Be Me" ("Je t'appartiens")
5.	"Happy to Be on an Island in the Sun"
6.	"My Reason"
7.	"With You"
8.	"Can't Say How Much I Love You"
9.	"Because"
10.	"When I'm a Kid"

Side 2
No.	Title	Length
1.	"When Forever Has Gone"
2.	"Lovely Lady of Arcadia"
3.	"My Friend the Wind"
4.	"Tell Me Now"
5.	"Lovely Sunny Days"
6.	"Kyrila"
7.	"Goodbye My Love Goodbye"
8.	"Good Days Have Gone"
9.	"I'll Be Your Friend"
10.	"Sing an Ode to Love"

== Charts ==
Chart (1978)	Peak position
UK Albums (OCC)	29

== Certifications ==
Region	Certification	Certified units/sales
United Kingdom (BPI)	Silver	60,000^{^}
^{^} Shipments figures based on certification alone.
