= The Story of Demis Roussos =

Compilation album by Demis Roussos
- Released: 1987
- Label: BR Music
- Producer: Ed Starink and Bert van Breda

Demis Roussos chronology
Greater Love (1986)	The Story of Demis Roussos (1987)	Come All Ye Faithful (1987)

Singles from The Story of Demis Roussos
- 1. "Rain and Tears" Released: 1987; 2. "Marie Jolie" Released: 1987; 3. "It's Five O'Clock" Released: 1987

The Story of ... Demis Roussos is a double LP by Greek singer Demis Roussos, released in 1987 on the label BR Music.

== Commercial performance ==
The album reached no. 16 in the Netherlands.

== Background ==
All the songs on the album were Demis Roussos's old songs (including some that he had sung as a vocalist with the band Aphrodite's Child).

The first 8 tracks (the whole side 1 and tracks 1–3 on side 2) were recorded live during "Goud van Oud Live" on April 10, 1987, in Rosmalen.

All the tracks on side 3 were new studio re-recordings of old Aphrodite Child's hits.

Another 7 tracks (tracks 4–5 on side 2 and the whole side 4) were from the Demis Roussos's 1986 album Greater Love. (As was the case with The Story of Demis Roussos, the album Greater Love was released on the label BR Music.)

The album The Story of Demis Roussos spanned three singles in 1987: "Rain and Tears" (a live recording from the above-mentioned concert in Rosmalen, Holland), "Marie Jolie", and "It's Five O'Clock". All the three were covers of Aphrodite's Child hits from the time Roussos was in the band.

== Track listing ==
The first three sides were produced by Ed Starink and Bert van Breda, except "Follow Me" produced by Raphael Preston & SP '86 and "Summerwine" produced by Ad Bowman for Nederland Muziekland.

The fourth side was produced by Raphael Preston and SP '86 for V2 Productions, except "Island of Love" produced by Tony Violaris.

Side One
No.	Title	Writer(s)	Length
1.	"Rain and Tears" (***)	E. Papathanassiou / B. Bergman	3:25
2.	"We Shall Dance" (***)	A. V. Roussos / Harris Chalkitis / B. Bergman	4:27
3.	"Forever and Ever" (***)	S. Vlavianos / A. Costandinos	3:40
4.	"My Friend the Wind" (***)	S. Vlavianos / A. Costandinos	5:25
5.	"My Reason" (***)	S. Vlavianos / C. Harris Chalkitis / H. Banks	4:55

Side Two
No.	Title	Writer(s)	Length
1.	"Marie Jolie" (***)	E. Papathanassiou / R. Francis	4:26
2.	"Goodbye, My Love, Goodbye" (***)	M. Panas / K. Munro / J. Lloyd	3:48
3.	"Lovely Lady of Arcadia" (***)	L. Leandros / K. Munro / J. Lloyd	3:25
4.	"Follow Me" (**)	Tony Violaris	2:53
5.	"Summerwine" (*) (with Nancy Boyd)	Lee Hazlewood	3:45

Side Three
No.	Title	Writer(s)	Length
1.	"It's Five O'Clock"	E. Papathanassiou / R. Francis	3:45
2.	"Spring, Summer, Winter and Fall"	E. Papathanassiou / R. Francis	4:52
3.	"I Want to Live"	J. P. Martini / arr. E. Papathanassiou / B. Bergman	3:40
4.	"Break"	E. Papathanassiou / C. Ferris	3:45
5.	"End of the World"	E. Papathanassiou / B. Bergman	3:38

Side Four
No.	Title	Writer(s)	Length
1.	"Summer in Her Eyes" (**)	Tony Violaris / SP '86	4:05
2.	"Greater Love" (**)	Valentino / SP '86	3:40
3.	"Tropicana Bay" (**) (with Nancy Boyd)	Valentino / SP '86	3:57
4.	"Island of Love" (****)	Tony Violaris	3:43
5.	"I Found You" (**)	Tony Violaris / SP '86	4:55

Produced by Ed Starink and Bert van Breda. Arranged by Ed Starink. Engineered by Sander Bos.
****' Produced by Tony Violaris
* Produced by Ad Bowman for Nederland Muziekland
** Produced by Raphael Preston and SP '86 for V2 Productions
*** Recorded live in Rosmalen (Holland) during "Goud van Oud Live" on April 10, 1987

== Charts ==
Chart (1987)	Peak position
Dutch Albums (Album Top 100)	16

== Certifications ==
Region	Certification	Certified units/sales
Netherlands (NVPI)	Gold	50,000^{^}
^{^} Shipments figures based on certification alone.
