= Greatest Hits (1974 Demis Roussos album) =

Greatest hits album by Demis Roussos
- Released: late 1973 or early 1974
- Label: Philips

Greatest Hits is a greatest hits album by Greek singer Demis Roussos, released in late 1973 or early 1974 on Philips Records.

== Commercial performance ==
The album spent eight weeks in the Dutch album chart in January–March 1974, peaking at no. 3.

== Track listing ==
LP Philips 6499 724 (Netherlands)

Side 1
| No. | Title | Length |
|---|---|---|
| 1. | "My Friend the Wind" | 3:55 |
| 2. | "Schönes Mädchen aus Arcadia" | 3:25 |
| 3. | "Forever and Ever" | 3:41 |
| 4. | "Lay It Down" | 3:45 |
| 5. | "No Way Out" | 3:25 |
| 6. | "Mara" | 3:59 |

Side 2
| No. | Title | Length |
|---|---|---|
| 1. | "Goodbye, My Love, Goodbye" | 3:58 |
| 2. | "We Shall Dance" | 3:33 |
| 3. | "My Reason" | 4:03 |
| 4. | "When I Am a Kid" | 3:17 |
| 5. | "So wie du bist" | 3:35 |
| 6. | "Velvet Mornings" | 3:38 |

== Charts ==
=== Weekly charts ===
| Chart (1974) | Peak position |
|---|---|
| Dutch Albums (Album Top 100) | 3 |

| Chart (2015) | Peak position |
|---|---|
| Italian Albums (FIMI) | 54 |

=== Year-end charts ===
| Chart (1974) | Position |
|---|---|
| Dutch Albums (Album Top 100) | 28 |
