= Forever and Ever – Definitive Collection =

Compilation album by Demis Roussos
- Released: 2002
- Label: Philips Music Group

Forever and Ever – Definitive Collection is a greatest hits album by Greek singer Demis Roussos, released in 2002 by the Philips Music Group.

== Commercial performance ==
The album debuted at no. 17 in the UK.

== Track listing ==
No.	Title	Writer(s)	Length
1.	"Forever and Ever"		3:38
2.	"Rain and Tears" (with Aphrodite's Child)		3:13
3.	"Goodbye My Love, Goodbye"		3:54
4.	"Bella Notte"		3:12
5.	"Happy to Be on an Island in the Sun"		3:09
6.	"My Friend the Wind"		3:51
7.	"I Want to Live" (with Aphrodite's Child)		3:51
8.	"We Shall Dance"		3:34
9.	"It's Five O'Clock" (with Aphrodite's Child)		3:25
10.	"Eleni"		3:47
11.	"Race to the End"		3:42
12.	"Torna a Surriento"		4:27
13.	"When Forever Has Gone"		3:01
14.	"Santa Lucia"		3:26
15.	"Una furtiva lagrima"		4:03
16.	"Velvet Mornings"		3:37
17.	"La mer"	C. Trenet / A. Lasry	6:53
18.	"My Reason"		3:58
19.	"Follow Me"		7:30

== Charts ==
Chart (2002)	Peak position
UK Albums (OCC)	17
