= Excerpts from "The Roussos Phenomenon" =

1976 EP by Demis Roussos

EP by Demis Roussos
- Released: 11 June 1976
- Genres: Pop; schlager
- Length: 14:47
- Label: Philips
- Producer: Demis Roussos

Demis Roussos chronology
Die Nacht und der Wein (1976)	Excerpts from "The Roussos Phenomenon" (1976)	Kyrila – Insel der Träume (1977)

Excerpts from "The Roussos Phenomenon" is an EP by Greek musician Demis Roussos, released in June 1976. The EP topped the UK singles chart, helping Roussos to achieve success in the UK.

== Background and release ==
By the mid-1970s, Roussos had become extremely successful throughout Europe. However, this success had not spread to such extent to the UK. This interested BBC television producer John King, who produced a documentary called The Roussos Phenomenon, which was first televised in the UK on 10 June 1976. Prior to the documentary, Roussos had been gaining popularity in the UK, achieving a top-five hit in December 1975 with "Happy to Be on an Island in the Sun", and several days before the broadcast, Phonogram (the parent company of Roussos' record label Philips) came to the decision to release a record featuring songs from the documentary. The release date on 11 June, meant that that pressing plant Phonodisc had to work round the clock for four days to keep to this date.

The EP features two songs from Roussos' 1973 album Forever and Ever, both of which had achieved success when released as singles in Europe: "My Friend the Wind" and "Forever and Ever", which was the main song plugged on the radio as well as the song performed by Roussos on Top of the Pops. The other two songs on the EP are "Sing an Ode to Love" from the 1975 album Souvenirs, and "So Dreamy" from the 1976 album Happy to Be....

According to Ken Maliphant, the marketing director for Phonogram, the release of the EP was "a calculated gamble". Phonogram expected there to be a big demand for Roussos' material but "were not sure if the public introduced to him through the television show would be prepared to fork out £3 for an album", so they decided to release an EP costing 65 pence. At the beginning of July 1976, Maliphant also said that "the EP has been one of Phonogram's fastest moving records of the year and has sold at between 15,000 and 25,000 a day. It has served finally to break Roussos in a big way in the UK."

Released in June 1976, Excerpts from "The Roussos Phenomenon" topped the UK singles chart a month later, becoming the first EP to do so. The highest charting EP had been the Beatles' Magical Mystery Tour which peaked at number two in 1968 (and before 1968 EPs had their own chart so were ineligible for the singles chart).

The surge in popularity also saw Roussos' album catalogue also achieve success, with My Only Fascination (1974) and Souvenirs (1975) reaching the top 40 and Forever and Ever (1973) and Happy to Be... (1976) peaking in the top five. A compilation album was also intended to be released in October 1976 titled The Roussos Phenomenon, though this did not transpire in the end. However, a compilation album with this name was eventually released in Australia, New Zealand and Japan in 1979.

== Track listing ==
Side A
No.	Title	Writer(s)	Length
1.	"Forever and Ever"	Alec R. Costandinos; Stélios Vlavianós	3:38
2.	"Sing an Ode to Love"	Costandinos; Vlavianós	4:07

Side B
No.	Title	Writer(s)	Length
3.	"So Dreamy"	Robert Rupen; Vlaviano	3:05
4.	"My Friend the Wind"	Costandinos; Vlavianós	3:57
Total length:			14:47

== Charts ==
Chart (1976)	Peak position
Ireland (IRMA)	4
UK Singles (Official Charts)	1

== Certifications ==
Region	Certification	Certified units/sales
United Kingdom (BPI)	Silver	60,000^{^}
^{^} Shipments figures based on certification alone.
