= Forever and Ever =

Forever and Ever may refer to:

- "For ever and ever" or "unto the ages of ages" ("in saecula saeculorum"), a biblical phrase

== Film and television ==
- Forever and Ever (film) (Chinese: 今生今世), a 1977 Hong Kong film directed by John Law
- Forever and Ever (Chinese: 地久天長), a 2001 Hong Kong film directed by Raymond To
- Forever and Ever (TV series), a 2021 Chinese romantic drama series

== Music ==
=== Albums ===
- Forever and Ever (David Choi album) or the title song, 2011
- Forever and Ever (Demis Roussos album) or the title song (see below), 1973
  - Forever and Ever – 40 Greatest Hits, by Demis Roussos, 1998
  - Forever and Ever – Definitive Collection, by Demis Roussos, 2002
- Forever and Ever (Dune album), 1998
- Forever and Ever (Howard Hewett album) or the title song, 1988
- Forever and Ever (Champion Jack Dupree album), 1991
- Forever & Ever, by Sales, 2018

=== Songs ===
- "Forever and Ever" (Demis Roussos song), 1973
- "Forever and Ever" (Franz Winkler and Malia Rosa song), 1948
- "Forever and Ever" (Slik song), 1976
- "Forever and Ever", by Joe Satriani from What Happens Next, 2018

== See also ==
- "Forever and Ever, Amen", a 1987 song by Randy Travis
- "Forever and Ever Amen", a 2010 song by the Drums from The Drums
- Forever + Ever x Infinity, a 2020 album by New Found Glory
