= List of number-one singles of 1973 (Spain) =

This is a list of the Spanish Singles number-ones of 1973.

== Chart history ==
Issue date	Song	Artist
1 January	"Speak Softly Love"	Andy Williams
8 January	"Speak Softly Love"	Andy Williams
15 January	"Speak Softly Love"	Andy Williams
22 January	"Speak Softly Love"	Andy Williams
29 January	"Speak Softly Love"	Andy Williams
5 February	"Speak Softly Love"	Andy Williams
12 February	"Sugar Me"	Lynsey de Paul
19 February	"Amor... Amar"	Camilo Sesto
26 February	"Amor... Amar"	Camilo Sesto
5 March	"Amor... Amar"	Camilo Sesto
12 March	"Amor... Amar"	Camilo Sesto
19 March	"Amor... Amar"	Camilo Sesto
26 March	"Amor... Amar"	Camilo Sesto
2 April	"Un Gato en la Oscuridad"	Roberto Carlos
9 April	"Hi, Hi, Hi"	Paul McCartney
16 April	"It Never Rains in Southern California"	Albert Hammond
23 April	"It Never Rains in Southern California"	Albert Hammond
30 April	"It Never Rains in Southern California"	Albert Hammond
7 May	"Eres tú"	Mocedades
14 May	"Eres tú"	Mocedades
21 May	"Charly"	Santabárbara
28 May	"Velvet Mornings"	Demis Roussos
4 June	"Velvet Mornings"	Demis Roussos
11 June	"Charly"	Santabárbara
18 June	"Eres tú"	Mocedades
25 June	"Eres tú"	Mocedades
2 July	"América, América"	Nino Bravo
9 July	"Eva María"	Fórmula V
16 July	"América, América"	Nino Bravo
23 July	"América, América"	Nino Bravo
30 July	"América, América"	Nino Bravo
6 August	"Eva María"	Fórmula V
13 August	"Eva María"	Fórmula V
20 August	"Eva María"	Fórmula V
27 August	"Eva María"	Fórmula V
3 August	"Eva María"	Fórmula V
10 September	"Eva María"	Fórmula V
17 September	"Y Viva España"	Manolo Escobar
24 September	"Y Viva España"	Manolo Escobar
1 October	"Eva María"	Fórmula V
8 October	"Eva María"	Fórmula V
15 October	"Eva María"	Fórmula V
22 October	"Can The Can"	Suzi Quatro
29 October	"Can The Can"	Suzi Quatro
5 November	"Goodbye My Love, Goodbye"	Demis Roussos
12 November	"Soledad"	Emilio José
19 November	"Can The Can"	Suzi Quatro
26 November	"Algo Más"	Camilo Sesto
3 December	"Algo Más"	Camilo Sesto
10 December	"Algo Más"	Camilo Sesto
17 December	"Algo Más"	Camilo Sesto
24 December	"Algo Más"	Camilo Sesto
31 December	"Algo Más"	Camilo Sesto

== See also ==
- 1973 in music
- List of number-one hits (Spain)
