= List of number-one singles of 1974 (Spain) =

This is a list of the Spanish Singles number-ones of 1974.

== Chart history ==
Issue date	Song	Artist
7 January	"Algo Más"	Camilo Sesto
14 January	"Algo Más"	Camilo Sesto
21 January	"Algo Más"	Camilo Sesto
28 January	"Algo Más"	Camilo Sesto
4 February	"Goodbye My Love, Goodbye"	Demis Roussos
11 February	"48 Crash"	Suzi Quatro
18 February	"48 Crash"	Suzi Quatro
25 February	"La Estrella de David"	Juan Bau
4 March	"La Estrella de David"	Juan Bau
11 March	"La Estrella de David"	Juan Bau
18 March	"La Distancia"	Roberto Carlos
25 March	"La Distancia"	Roberto Carlos
1 April	"La Distancia"	Roberto Carlos
8 April	"La Distancia"	Roberto Carlos
15 April	"La Distancia"	Roberto Carlos
22 April	"La Distancia"	Roberto Carlos
29 April	"La Distancia"	Roberto Carlos
6 May	"Someday Somewhere"	Demis Roussos
13 May	"Someday Somewhere"	Demis Roussos
20 May	"Someday Somewhere"	Demis Roussos
27 May	"La Distancia"	Roberto Carlos
3 June	"La Distancia"	Roberto Carlos
10 June	"La Distancia"	Roberto Carlos
17 June	"Ayudadme"	Camilo Sesto
24 June	"Ayudadme"	Camilo Sesto
1 July	"Ayudadme"	Camilo Sesto
8 July	"Ayudadme"	Camilo Sesto
15 July	"Love's Theme"	The Love Unlimited Orchestra
22 July	"Love's Theme"	The Love Unlimited Orchestra
29 July	"Love's Theme"	The Love Unlimited Orchestra
5 August	"Love's Theme"	The Love Unlimited Orchestra
12 August	"Love's Theme"	The Love Unlimited Orchestra
19 August	"Love's Theme"	The Love Unlimited Orchestra
26 August	"Acalorado"	Los Diablos
2 September	"Acalorado"	Los Diablos
9 September	"Tómame o Déjame"	Mocedades
16 September	"Tómame o Déjame"	Mocedades
23 September	"Tómame o Déjame"	Mocedades
30 September	"TSOP (The Sound of Philadelphia)"	MFSB
7 October	"TSOP (The Sound of Philadelphia)"	MFSB
14 October	"TSOP (The Sound of Philadelphia)"	MFSB
21 October	"Let Me Get To Know You"	Paul Anka
28 October	"Rock Your Baby"	George McCrae
4 November	"Rock Your Baby"	George McCrae
11 November	"Rock Your Baby"	George McCrae
18 November	"Rock Your Baby"	George McCrae
25 November	"Rock Your Baby"	George McCrae
2 December	"Rock Your Baby"	George McCrae
9 December	"Rock Your Baby"	George McCrae
16 December	"¿Quieres Ser Mi Amante?"	Camilo Sesto
23 December	"Todo El Tiempo Del Mundo"	Manolo Otero
30 December	"Todo El Tiempo Del Mundo"	Manolo Otero

== See also ==
- 1974 in music
- List of number-one hits (Spain)
