= List of number-one albums of 2015 (Belgium) =

The Belgian Albums Chart, divided into the two main regions Flanders and Wallonia, ranks the best-performing albums in Belgium, as compiled by Ultratop.

== Flanders ==
Issue date	Album	Artist	Reference
3 January	Rock or Bust	AC/DC	
10 January	Back to Back	Will Tura & Christoff	
17 January	Entity	Oscar and the Wolf	
24 January	Entity	Oscar and the Wolf	
31 January	Entity	Oscar and the Wolf	
7 February	Ways of a Wild Heart	The Scabs	
14 February	Ghost Rockers	Ghost Rockers	
21 February	Ghost Rockers	Ghost Rockers	
28 February	Ghost Rockers	Ghost Rockers	
7 March	Fifty Shades of Grey	Soundtrack	
14 March	Paramount	Ozark Henry with the National Orchestra of Belgium	
21 March	Rebel Heart	Madonna	
28 March	Tracker	Mark Knopfler	
4 April	Reason	Selah Sue	
11 April	Reason	Selah Sue	
18 April	Reason	Selah Sue	
25 April	Reason	Selah Sue	
2 May	Collected	Demis Roussos	
9 May	Liefde voor publiek	Stan Van Samang	
16 May	Liefde voor publiek	Stan Van Samang	
23 May	Liefde voor publiek	Stan Van Samang	
30 May	Liefde voor publiek	Stan Van Samang	
6 June	Liefde voor publiek	Stan Van Samang	
13 June	Liefde voor publiek	Stan Van Samang	
20 June	Liefde voor publiek	Stan Van Samang	
27 June	Liefde voor publiek	Stan Van Samang	
4 July	Liefde voor publiek	Stan Van Samang	
11 July	Liefde voor publiek	Stan Van Samang	
18 July	Liefde voor publiek	Stan Van Samang	
25 July	Liefde voor publiek	Stan Van Samang	
1 August	Liefde voor publiek	Stan Van Samang	
8 August	Liefde voor publiek	Stan Van Samang	
15 August	Compton	Dr. Dre	
22 August	Liefde voor publiek	Stan Van Samang	
29 August	Liefde voor publiek	Stan Van Samang	
5 September	Liefde voor publiek	Stan Van Samang	
12 September	The Book of Souls	Iron Maiden	
19 September	Liefde voor publiek	Stan Van Samang	
26 September	Rattle That Lock	David Gilmour	
3 October	Rattle That Lock	David Gilmour	
10 October	In Dream	Editors	
17 October	In Dream	Editors	
24 October	Highway Cruiser	The Black Box Revelation	
31 October	Porta Bohemica	Trixie Whitley	
7 November	Voices	Regi	
14 November	Delirium	Ellie Goulding	
21 November	Made in the A.M.	One Direction	
28 November	25	Adele	
5 December	25	Adele	
12 December	25	Adele	
19 December	25	Adele	
26 December	10.000 luchtballonnen	K3	

== Wallonia ==
Issue date	Album	Artist	Reference
3 January	Les feux d'artifice	Calogero	
10 January	Les feux d'artifice	Calogero	
17 January	Les feux d'artifice	Calogero	
24 January	Kendji	Kendji Girac	
31 January	Kendji	Kendji Girac	
7 February	Kendji	Kendji Girac	
14 February	R.E.D.	M. Pokora	
21 February	R.E.D.	M. Pokora	
28 February	Chaleur humaine	Christine and the Queens	
7 March	Chaleur humaine	Christine and the Queens	
14 March	Chaleur humaine	Christine and the Queens	
21 March	Sur la route des Enfoirés 2015	Les Enfoirés	
28 March	Sur la route des Enfoirés 2015	Les Enfoirés	
4 April	Sur la route des Enfoirés 2015	Les Enfoirés	
11 April	Reason	Selah Sue	
18 April	Reason	Selah Sue	
25 April	D.U.C	Booba	
2 May	In extremis	Francis Cabrel	
9 May	In extremis	Francis Cabrel	
16 May	In extremis	Francis Cabrel	
23 May	In extremis	Francis Cabrel	
30 May	In extremis	Francis Cabrel	
6 June	In extremis	Francis Cabrel	
13 June	Drones	Muse	
20 June	Drones	Muse	
27 June	Drones	Muse	
4 July	Drones	Muse	
11 July	Drones	Muse	
18 July	Chambre 12	Louane	
25 July	Chambre 12	Louane	
1 August	Chambre 12	Louane	
8 August	Chambre 12	Louane	
15 August	Chambre 12	Louane	
22 August	Chambre 12	Louane	
29 August	Chambre 12	Louane	
5 September	Mon coeur avait raison	Maître Gims	
12 September	Mon coeur avait raison	Maître Gims	
19 September	Mon coeur avait raison	Maître Gims	
26 September	Rattle That Lock	David Gilmour	
3 October	Rattle That Lock	David Gilmour	
10 October	Mon coeur avait raison	Maître Gims	
17 October	Mon coeur avait raison	Maître Gims	
24 October	Mon coeur avait raison	Maître Gims	
31 October	Mon coeur avait raison	Maître Gims	
7 November	Ensemble	Kendji Girac	
14 November	Interstellaires	Mylène Farmer	
21 November	De l'amour	Johnny Hallyday	
28 November	25	Adele	
5 December	25	Adele	
12 December	25	Adele	
19 December	25	Adele	
26 December	25	Adele	
