= List of Dutch Top 40 number-one singles of 1973 =

These hits topped the Dutch Top 40 in 1973.

Issue Date	Song	Artist(s)	Reference
6 January	"Crazy Horses"	The Osmonds	
13 January	"Crazy Horses"	The Osmonds	
20 January	"Crazy Horses"	The Osmonds	
27 January	"Crazy Horses"	The Osmonds	
3 February	"Block Buster!"	The Sweet	
10 February	"Block Buster!"	The Sweet	
17 February	"Block Buster!"	The Sweet	
24 February	"Block Buster!"	The Sweet	
3 March	"Go Like Elijah"	Chi Coltrane	
10 March	"Go Like Elijah"	Chi Coltrane	
17 March	"Go Like Elijah"	Chi Coltrane	
24 March	"Down by the Lazy River"	The Osmonds	
31 March	"Down by the Lazy River"	The Osmonds	
7 April	"Le lac majeur"	Mort Shuman	
14 April	"Le lac majeur"	Mort Shuman	
21 April	"Le lac majeur"	Mort Shuman	
28 April	"Power to All Our Friends"	Cliff Richard	
5 May	"Power to All Our Friends"	Cliff Richard	
12 May	"Power to All Our Friends"	Cliff Richard	
19 May	"Power to All Our Friends"	Cliff Richard	
26 May	"Tie a Yellow Ribbon Round the Ole Oak Tree"	Tony Orlando and Dawn	
2 June	"Tie a Yellow Ribbon Round the Ole Oak Tree"	Tony Orlando and Dawn	
9 June	"We Were All Wounded at Wounded Knee"	Redbone	
16 June	"We Were All Wounded at Wounded Knee"	Redbone	
23 June	"We Were All Wounded at Wounded Knee"	Redbone	
30 June	"We Were All Wounded at Wounded Knee"	Redbone	
7 July	"We Were All Wounded at Wounded Knee"	Redbone	
14 July	"Do You Love Me?"	Sharif Dean	
21 July	"Do You Love Me?"	Sharif Dean	
28 July	"Do You Love Me?"	Sharif Dean	
4 August	"Do You Love Me?"	Sharif Dean	
11 August	"Do You Love Me?"	Sharif Dean	
18 August	"Rote Rosen"	Freddy Breck	
25 August	"Rote Rosen"	Freddy Breck	
1 September	"Rote Rosen"	Freddy Breck	
8 September	"Rote Rosen"	Freddy Breck	
15 September	"Radar Love"	Golden Earring	
22 September	"Radar Love"	Golden Earring	
29 September	"Radar Love"	Golden Earring	
6 October	"My Friend the Wind"	Demis Roussos	
13 October	"My Friend the Wind"	Demis Roussos	
20 October	"Angie"	The Rolling Stones	
27 October	"Angie"	The Rolling Stones	
3 November	"Angie"	The Rolling Stones	
10 November	"Angie"	The Rolling Stones	
17 November	"The Day That Curly Billy Shot Down Crazy Sam McGee"	The Hollies	
24 November	"The Day That Curly Billy Shot Down Crazy Sam McGee"	The Hollies	
1 December	"Schönes Mädchen aus Arcadia"	Demis Roussos	
8 December	"Schönes Mädchen aus Arcadia"	Demis Roussos	
15 December	"t Is weer voorbij die mooie zomer"	Gerard Cox	
22 December	"t Is weer voorbij die mooie zomer"	Gerard Cox	
29 December	"t Is weer voorbij die mooie zomer"	Gerard Cox	

== See also ==
- 1973 in music
