= Life and Love =

Life and Love or Life and Love may refer to:

- Life & Love, a 1978 album by Demis Roussos
- Life and Love (Leon Russell album), 1979
- Life and Love, a 1998 album by Philip Bailey
