= Time (Demis Roussos album) =

Studio album by Demis Roussos
- Released: 1988
- Label: EMI Bovema B.V.
- Producer: Gerard Stellaard

Demis Roussos chronology
Reflection (1984) Le Grec (1988)	Time (1988)	Voice and Vision (1989)

Singles from Time
- 1. "Time" Released: 1988; 2. "My Song of Love" Released: 1988; 3. "Dance of Love / "Loving You"" Released: 1989; 4. "Mamy Blue" Released: 1989

Time is a studio album by Greek singer Demis Roussos, released in 1988 on EMI Bovema B.V.

== Commercial performance ==
In January 1989 the album debuted at no. 36 in Sweden.

== Track listing ==
All tracks produced and arranged by Gerard Stellaard.

CD
No.	Title	Length
1.	"The Moon and I"	4:31
2.	"Time"	4:16
3.	"Turning"	5:05
4.	"Step by Step"	4:06
5.	"Mamy Blue"	4:16
6.	"Dance of Love"	4:04
7.	"I Won't Give Up"	3:59
8.	"My Song of Love"	4:20
9.	"Loving You"	3:45
10.	"Let the Bells Ring"	3:50
11.	"Looking For You"	3:41

== Charts ==
Weekly chart performance for Time
Chart (1988–1989)	Peak position
Dutch Albums (Album Top 100)	79
Swedish Albums (Sverigetopplistan)	36
