= Auf Wiedersehn (album) =

Studio album by Demis Roussos
- Released: 1974
- Label: Philips
- Producer: Leo Leandros

Demis Roussos chronology
My Only Fascination (1974)	Auf Wiedersehn (1974)	Souvenirs (1975)

Singles from Auf Wiedersehn
- 1. "Schönes Mädchen aus Arcadia" Released: 1973; 2. "Auf Wiedersehn" Released: 1974; 3. "Manuela" Released: 1978

Auf Wiedersehn is a German-language studio album by Greek singer Demis Roussos, released in 1974 on Philips Records.

== Commercial performance ==
The album reached no. 7 in the Netherlands.

== Track listing ==
Produced by Leo Leandros.

Side A
No.	Title	Length
1.	"Manuela"	3:45
2.	"So wie du bist"	3:35
3.	"Walzer für zwei"	3:12
4.	"Ich liebe dich noch immer"	3:50
5.	"Velvet Mornings"	3:38
6.	"Addio"	3:36

Side B
No.	Title	Length
1.	"Wind Wind"	3:23
2.	"Mara"	3:57
3.	"Brauchst du einen Freund"	3:17
4.	"Schönes Mädchen aus Arcadia"	3:43
5.	"Auf Wiedersehn"	3:35

== Charts ==
Chart (1974)	Peak position
Dutch Albums (Album Top 100)	7
