= Manuela (Demis Roussos song) =

Single by Demis Roussos

from the album Auf Wiedersehn
- Released: 1974
- Label: Philips
- Songwriter(s): Klaus Munro, Leo Leandros
- Producer(s): Leo Leandros

Demis Roussos singles chronology
"With You" (1974)	"Manuela" (1974)	"Schön wie Mona Lisa (Wenn ich ein Maler wär')" (1974)

"Manuela" is a song by Greek singer Demis Roussos from his 1974 German-language album Auf Wiedersehn. It was also released also as a single (in 1974 on Philips Records).

== Background and writing ==
The song was written by Klaus Munro and Leo Leandros. The recording was produced by Leo Leandros.

== Commercial performance ==
The song reached no. 42 in Germany.

== Track listing ==
7" single Philips 6009 555 (November 1974, Germany, Austria)

A. "Manuela" (3:45)
B. "Addio" (3:37)

== Charts ==
Chart (1974)	Peak position
Germany	42
