= Reflection (Demis Roussos album) =

Studio album by Demis Roussos
- Released: 1984
- Recorded: Nemo Studios, London
- Label: Mercury
- Producer: Vangelis

Demis Roussos chronology
Attitudes (1982)	Reflection (1984)	Senza tempo (1985)

Singles from Reflection
- 1. "Love Me Tender" Released: 1984; 2. "Stand by Me" Released: 1984; 3. "When a Man Loves a Woman" Released: 1984

Reflection is an album released in 1984 by Demis Roussos.

After having collaborated several times since the days of Aphrodite's Child, Reflection was the last album on which Roussos and Vangelis collaborated. Another member from that band, guitarist Argyris 'Silver' Koulouris, also appears on this album. Vangelis' habitual collaborators, jazz saxophonist Dick Morrissey, and vocalists Carol Kenyon and Tessa Niles also appear.

== Track listing ==
1. "When a Man Loves a Woman" (A. Wright & C. Lewis)
2. "Stand by Me" (J. Leiber, M. Stoller, King & Nelson)
3. "Love Me Tender" (Elvis Presley & Vera Matson)
4. "The Great Pretender" (Buck Raum)
5. "Stormy Weather" (Ted Koehler & Harold Arlen)
6. "I Almost Lost My Mind" (Ivory Joe Hunter)
7. "Marie Jolie" (R. Francis & Vangelis)
8. "Smoke Gets in Your Eyes" (Otto Harbach & Jerome Kern)
9. "As Time Goes By" (H. Hupfeld)

== Personnel ==
- Produced and arranged by Vangelis.
- Guitars: Argyris 'Silver' Koulouris
- Saxophone: Dick Morrissey
- Backing vocals: Carol Kenyon and Tessa Niles
- Engineers: Raphael Preston and Jess Sutcliffe

== Charts ==
Chart (1984)	Peak position
Australia (Kent Music Report)	29
