= Nancy Boyd (singer) =

Belgian singer

Nancy Bruinooge (born 24 November 1963), better known by the stage name Nancy Boyd, is a singer originally from Belgium. She had modest pop music success in the late 1980s and early 1990s working with the Dutch label BR Music, and is principally known for her cover versions of popular songs.

Nancy Boyd & The Capello's reached the Dutch Top 40 with the single "Let's Hang On" from the 1987 album of the same name, which was produced by Ed Starink and Bert van Breda. Another song on this album was a cover version of "Summer Wine" (released as "Summerwine"), a collaboration with Demis Roussos that was first released in 1986. Bruinooge also collaborated with Roussos on the song "Tropicana Bay" in the same year.
