= On the Greek Side of My Mind =

Studio album by Demis Roussos
- Released: 1971
- Label: Philips Records
- Producer: Jean-Claude Desmarty

Demis Roussos chronology
| On the Greek Side of My Mind (1971) | Forever and Ever (1973) |

Singles from On the Greek Side of My Mind
- 1. "We Shall Dance" Released: 1971; 2. "Fire and Ice" Released: 1971

Professional ratings
Review scores
| Source | Rating |
|---|---|
| The Virgin Encyclopedia of 70s Music | 3/5 stars |

On the Greek Side of My Mind (also known as Fire and Ice) is a debut solo album by Greek singer Demis Roussos, released in 1971 on Philips Records.

== Commercial performance ==
The album entered the top 10 in Denmark (according to I.F.P.I. data).

== Track listings ==
Arranged by Demis Roussos. String arrangements by Lakis Vlavianos.

=== Fire and Ice (Philips 6325 129) ===
Side 1
| No. | Title | Writer(s) | Length |
|---|---|---|---|
| 1. | "Fire and Ice" | Stelios Vlavianos, Boris Bergman | 4:33 |
| 2. | "She Came Up from the North" ("Tasteri tou voria") | M. Hadjidakis, Bergman | 3:25 |
| 3. | "Good Days Have Gone" | A. Koulouris, Bergman | 3:43 |
| 4. | "We Shall Dance" | A.V. Roussos, Bergman | 3:33 |
| 5. | "I Know I'll Do It Again" ("Tora pou megalossa") | Costas Hadjis, Bergman | 2:45 |
| 6. | "On the Greek Side of My Mind" | A.V. Roussos, Bergman | 3:45 |

Side 2
| No. | Title | Writer(s) | Length |
|---|---|---|---|
| 1. | "End of the Line" | A. Koulouris, Bergman | 2:10 |
| 2. | "My Blue Ship's A-Sailin'" | A.V. Roussos, Bergman | 3:45 |
| 3. | "Mountains Beyond" | A. Koulouris, Bergman | 4:12 |
| 4. | "O My Friends You've Been Untrue to Me" | A.V. Roussos, Bergman | 4:43 |
| 5. | "Lord of the Flies" | J.P. Pouret, Bergman | 4:23 |
| 6. | "Without You" | S. Spanoudakis | 1:58 |

=== On the Greek Side of My Mind (Philips 63332 012) ===
Side 1
| No. | Title | Writer(s) | Length |
|---|---|---|---|
| 1. | "On the Greek Side of My Mind" | A.V. Roussos / Boris Bergman | 3:45 |
| 2. | "She Came Up from the North (Tasteri Tou Voria)" | M. Hadjidakis / Boris Bergman | 3:25 |
| 3. | "Good Days Have Gone" | A. Koulouris / Boris Bergman | 3:43 |
| 4. | "We Shall Dance" | A.V. Roussos / Boris Bergman | 3:33 |
| 5. | "I Know I'll Do It Again (Tora Pou Megalossa)" | C. Hadjis / Boris Bergman | 2:45 |
| 6. | "Fire and Ice" | S. Vlavianos / A.V. Roussos / Boris Bergman | 4:33 |

Side 2
| No. | Title | Writer(s) | Length |
|---|---|---|---|
| 1. | "End of the Line" | A. Koulouris / Boris Bergman | 2:10 |
| 2. | "My Blue Ship's A-sailin" | A.V. Roussos & A. Koulouris / Boris Bergman | 3:45 |
| 3. | "Mountains Beyond" | A. Koulouris / Boris Bergman | 4:12 |
| 4. | "O My Friends You've Been Untrue to Me" | A. Koulouris & A.V. Roussos / Boris Bergman | 4:43 |
| 5. | "Lord of the Flies" | J.P. Pouret / Boris Bergman | 4:23 |
| 6. | "Without You" | S. Spanoudakis / Boris Bergman | 1:58 |

== Certifications ==
| Region | Certification | Certified units/sales |
|---|---|---|
| United Kingdom (BPI) | Silver | 60,000^{^} |
^{^} Shipments figures based on certification alone.
