= The Demis Roussos Magic =

Studio album by Demis Roussos
- Released: March 1977
- Label: Philips; Mercury (US)
- Producer: Vangelis Papathanassiou; Peter Sullivan ("When Forever Has Gone")

Demis Roussos chronology
| Kyrila – Insel der Träume (1977) | The Demis Roussos Magic (1977) | Ainsi Soit-Il (1977) |

Singles from The Demis Roussos Magic
- 1. "When Forever Has Gone" Released: 1976; 2. "Because" Released: 1977

The Demis Roussos Magic is a studio album by Greek singer Demis Roussos, released in 1977 on Philips Records.

== Commercial performance ==
The album reached no. 29 in the UK.

== Track listing ==
All tracks arranged and produced by Vangelis Papathanassiou, except "When Forever Has Gone" produced by Peter Sullivan.

Side A
| No. | Title | Writer(s) | Length |
|---|---|---|---|
| 1. | "Because" | Papathanassiou/Constandinos |
| 2. | "Time and Tide" | Paul Williams |
| 3. | "Maybe Forever" | Fitoussi/Wendroff/Tobaly/Meimoun/Bitton |
| 4. | "My Face In The Rain" | Papathanassiou/Dassin |
| 5. | "I Dig You" | Fitoussi/Dassin/Costandinos |

Side B
| No. | Title | Writer(s) | Length |
|---|---|---|---|
| 1. | "Margarita" | Tom Jans |
| 2. | "Let It Happen" | Papathanassiou/Dassin |
| 3. | "When Forever Has Gone" | Vlavianos/Mason |
| 4. | "Day-O (Banana Boat Song)" | Burgess/Attaway/Belafonte |
| 5. | "Sister Emeline" | Assous/Costandinos |
| 6. | "Before the Storm" | Vlavianos/Costandinos |

== Charts ==
| Chart (1977) | Peak position |
|---|---|
| UK Albums (OCC) | 29 |

== Certifications ==
| Region | Certification | Certified units/sales |
|---|---|---|
| France (SNEP) | Gold | 100,000^{*} |
| United Kingdom (BPI) | Silver | 60,000^{^} |
^{*} Sales figures based on certification alone.^{^} Shipments figures based on certification alone.
