= Kyrila – Insel der Träume =

Studio album by Demis Roussos
- Released: 1977
- Label: Philips
- Producer: Leo Leandros

Demis Roussos chronology
Die Nacht und der Wein (1976)	Kyrila – Insel der Träume (1977)	The Demis Roussos Magic (1977)

Singles from Kyrila — Insel der Träume
- 1. "Kyrila" Released: 1977

Kyrila – Insel der Träume is a German-language studio album by Greek singer Demis Roussos, released in 1977 on Philips Records.

One song from the album was released as a single, it was the German version of "Kyrila".

== Commercial performance ==
The album reached no. 36 in Germany.

== Track listing ==
All tracks produced by Leo Leandros.

Side A
No.	Title	Writer(s)	Length
1.	"Kyrila" ("Etongi")	Ekambi Brilliant, Wolfgang Mürmann	3:36
2.	"Wenn die Freunde gehen" ("Ena messi meri")	Zachos Hadjifotiou, Stavros Xarchakos, Mürmann	3:34
3.	"Trink mit mir den Sommerwein" ("I Have You")	John Bettis, Richard Carpenter, Mürmann	3:16
4.	"Komm in meine Arme"	Klaus Munro, Leo Leandros	4:00
5.	"Schade Marie"	Munro, Leandros	3:40

Side B
No.	Title	Writer(s)	Length
1.	"Kehr wieder um"	Munro, Leandros	3:43
2.	"Leierkasten auf dem Boulevard"	Munro, Leandros	2:58
3.	"Trauriges Mädchen"	Munro, Leandros	4:04
4.	"Liebe kennt viele Namen" ("Il fait beau sur la terre")	Miroslav Konecny, Ralf Arnie	3:18
5.	"Die Nächte von Athen"	Munro, Leandros	3:44

== Charts ==
Chart (1977)	Peak position
Germany	36
