= On écrit sur les murs =

Single by Demis Roussos

from the album Voice and Vision
- Released: 1990
- Recorded: 1989
- Genre: Rock
- Length: 3:47
- Label: EMI
- Songwriters: Romano Musumarra; Jean-Marie Moreau
- Producer: Fred Savio

Demis Roussos singles chronology
"Mamy Blue" (1989)	"On écrit sur les murs" (1990)	"Magdalena" (1989)

"On écrit sur les murs" (English: "We Write on the Walls") is a 1989 song by Greek singer Demis Roussos from the album Voice and Vision. Written by Romano Musumarra and Jean-Marie Moreau, it was released as first single from the album in January 1990 and achieved success in France where it peaked at number four. In 2015, Kids United covered the song on the album Un monde meilleur. It peaked at number three on the French Singles Chart, on 12 February 2016.

== Critical reception ==
Elia Habib, an expert of French chart, gave a positive review of the song, stating that Musumarra "here confirms his know-how for simple and greatly catchy melodies"; he also adds that lyrically, "Roussos sings hope in an idealistic breath that the chorus powerfully conveys", as the latter is performed by a choir performs "a utopian spirit that the bridge orchestration amplifies".

== Chart performance ==
In France, "On écrit sur les murs" can be considered as a sleeper hit, as it debuted at number 50 on the chart edition of 20 January 1990. Then it climbed regularly and peaked at number four for non-consecutive two weeks. It remained in the top ten for a total of 11 weeks, and fell off the top 50 straight from number 20, after 23 weeks of presence. On the European Hot 100, it started at number 67 on 3 March 1990, reached a peak of number 16 twice, in its fifth and eleventh weeks, and spent 19 weeks on the chart.

== Track listings ==
- 7" single
1. "On écrit sur les murs" — 3:34
2. "Time" — 4:16
- CD single
1. "On écrit sur les murs" — 3:34
2. "Time" — 4:16

== Credits ==
- Bagpipes – Christian Million
- Composition – Romano Musumara
- Engineer – Bruno Fourrier, Olivier de Bosson
- Lyrics – Jean-Marie Moreau
- Mixing – Jean-Philippe Bonichon
- Production – Loris Baccheschi, Romano Musumara
- Artwork – Nuit de Chine
- Photography – Youri Lenquette

== Charts ==
=== Weekly charts ===
Chart (1990)	Peak position
Europe (European Hot 100)	16
France (SNEP)	4

=== Year-end charts ===
Chart (1990)	Position
Europe (Eurochart Hot 100)	78

=== Certifications ===
Certifications for "On écrit sur les murs"
Region	Certification	Certified units/sales
France (SNEP)	Gold	400,000^{*}
^{*} Sales figures based on certification alone.

== Kids United version ==
=== Weekly charts ===
Chart (2016)	Peak position
Belgium (Ultratop 50 Wallonia)	41
France (SNEP)	3

== Other cover versions ==
German singer Nicole Hohloch covered the song German, titled Jeder Zaun, jede Mauer wird aus Blumen sein in 1992. "On écrit sur les murs" was adapted by Worlds Apart in 2007. Les Enfoirés adapted the song twice: first in 2008, and was sung by Bénabar and Maxime Le Forestier with Francis Cabrel, Gérald de Palmas, Elsa Delétang, Patrick Fiori, (Garou, David Hallyday, Catherine Lara and Christophe Maé, then in 2017 with Tal, Soprano, Grégoire, Amir, Michaël Youn, Laure Pester, Jeff Panacloc, Liane Foly, Jean-Baptiste Maunier, Bénabar and Claire Keim as singers. In April 2016, it was covered by Canadian band Raffy as the theme song of the Fondation Véro et Louis, founded by Véronique Cloutier et Louis Morissette, which part of benefits from the song downloads were given to this association created to help Quebec people diagnosed with autism. This adaptation was successful and was number one on iTunes for several days.
