= My Only Fascination (album) =

Studio album by Demis Roussos
- Released: 1974
- Label: Philips Records
- Producer: Demis Roussos (tracks 1–4, 6, 8 and 9), Mike Curb (tracks 5 & 10), Leo Leandris (track 7)

Demis Roussos chronology
Forever and Ever (1973)	My Only Fascination (1974)	Auf Wiedersehn (1974)

Singles from My Only Fascination
- 1. "Someday Somewhere" Released: 1973; 2. "Lovely Lady of Arcadia" Released: 1974; 3. "My Only Fascination" Released: 1974

My Only Fascination is a studio album by Greek singer Demis Roussos, released in 1974 on Philips Records.

== Commercial performance ==
The album reached no. 39 in the UK and no. 6 in Norway.

== Track listing ==
Side A
No.	Title	Writer(s)	Length
1.	"My Only Fascination"	S. Vlavianos/R. Costandinos	3:40
2.	"White Sails"	L. Sideras/D. Moutsis	2:40
3.	"Marlene"	S. Vlavianos/Boris Bergman	3:08
4.	"Say You Love Me"	Trad., arr. S. Vlavianos/R. Costandinos	2:55
5.	"Smile"	Turner/Parsons/Chaplin	3:00
6.	"Someday Somewhere"	S. Vlavianos/R. Costandinos	3:00

Side B
No.	Title	Writer(s)	Length
1.	"Lovely Lady of Arcadia"	M. Panas/K. Munro/J. LLoyd	3:20
2.	"Shadows"	S. Vlavianos/R. Costandinos	3:40
3.	"Reverie"	S. Vlavianos/R. Costandinos	3:40
4.	"We Pretend"	S. Vlavianos/R. Costandinos	4:55
5.	"Let It Be Me (Je t'appartiens)"	P. Delanoë/G. Bécaud/M. Curtis	3:20

== Charts ==
Chart (1974–1975)	Peak position
Norwegian Albums (VG-lista)	6
UK Albums (OCC)	4

== Certifications ==
Region	Certification	Certified units/sales
Finland (Musiikkituottajat)	Gold	15,000
France (SNEP)	Gold	100,000^{*}
Sweden (GLF)	Gold	40,500
United Kingdom (BPI)	Gold	100,000^{^}
^{*} Sales figures based on certification alone.^{^} Shipments figures based on certification alone.
