= With You (Demis Roussos song) =

Single by Demis Roussos
- Released: 1974
- Label: Philips
- Songwriter(s): Barry Mason, Stélios Vlavianós
- Producer(s): Leo Leandros

Demis Roussos singles chronology
"Auf Wiedersehn" (1974)	"With You" (1974)	"Manuela" (1974)

"With You" is a song by Greek singer Demis Roussos. It was released as a single in 1974.

== Background and writing ==
The song was written by Barry Mason and Stélios Vlavianós. The recording was produced by Demis Roussos.

== Commercial performance ==
The song reached no. 18 in Belgium (Flanders)

== Track listing ==
7" single Philips 6009 543 (1974, France, Germany, Italy, Netherlands, Norway, etc.)
7" single RTB / Philips S 53804 (1974, Yugoslavia)

A. "With You" (3:16)
B. "When Forever Has Gone" (3:32)

== Charts ==
Chart (1974)	Peak position
Belgium (Ultratop 50 Flanders)	18
