= Attitudes (Demis Roussos album) =

1982 studio album by Demis Roussos

Studio album by Demis Roussos
- Released: 1982
- Genre: Pop
- Length: 37:47
- Label: Mercury
- Producer: Rainer Pietsch

Demis Roussos chronology
Man of the World (1980)	Attitudes (1982)	Demis (1982)

Singles from Attitudes
- 1. "Follow Me" Released: 1982

Attitudes is the seventeenth studio album by Greek singer Demis Roussos, released in 1982, by Mercury Records.

== Track listing ==
Attitudes – Side one
No.	Title	Writer(s)	Length
1.	"Follow Me"	Joaquín Rodrigo; Herbert Kretzmer; Hal Shaper	7:25
2.	"Pretender"	Wayne Hunt	5:03
3.	"Planet Earth is Blue"	Michael Holm; Tim Rice	5:48
Total length:			18:16

Attitudes – Side two
No.	Title	Writer(s)	Length
1.	"Deepest of All"	Susan Black; Jim Taylor	3:05
2.	"Take My Hand"	Danny Everitt; Engelbert Simons; Klaus Gehrke	4:24
3.	"Flaming Star"	Wolff-Ekkehardt Stein; Wolfgang Jass	4:08
4.	"The House of the Rising Sun"		7:54
Total length:			19:31

== Personnel ==
Credits adopted from the album's liner notes.

Musicians

- Demis Roussos – lead vocals
- Kristian Schultze – synthesizers

Production

- Rainer Pietsch – producer

== Charts ==
Chart (1982/83)	Peak position
Australia (Kent Music Report)	44
