= Auf Wiederseh'n, Sweetheart =

Popular song

"Auf Wiedersehen", or "Auf Wiederseh'n, Sweetheart", is a song written by German composer Eberhard Storch around 1950. Storch wrote the song in the hospital for his wife Maria as he was ill for a long time. It was originally sung in German by Rudi Schuricke and released on the 78 rpm record Polydor 48 374 H in 1950.

It should not be confused with the 1932 song Auf Wiedersehen, My Dear.

== Vera Lynn version ==
"Auf Wiederseh'n, Sweetheart"

Single by Vera Lynn
- Language: English
- Released: May 1952
- Recorded: 1952
- Genre: Traditional pop
- Length: 2:36
- Label: London
- Composer: Eberhard Storch
- Lyricists: John Turner and Geoffrey Parsons (English lyrics)

Vera Lynn singles chronology
"Again" (1949)	"Auf Wiederseh'n, Sweetheart" (1952)	"Forget Me Not" (1952)

The English language lyrics were written by John Turner and Geoffrey Parsons. The best-known version of the song was recorded by British singer Vera Lynn. The story goes that Vera was on holiday in Switzerland and heard people singing the song in beer parlours, and when she got back she felt she had to record it, so found the music and had lyrics written.

=== Charts ===
The recording of the song by Vera Lynn, which featured accompaniment by Soldiers and Airmen of HM Forces and the Johnny Johnston Singers, was the first song recorded by a foreign artist to make number one on the U.S. Billboard charts, in 1952. Reaching the summit on the Billboard "Best Sellers in Stores" chart on July 12, the song spent nine weeks at No. 1 (as well as six weeks on the "Most Played by Jockeys" chart and four weeks on the "Most Played in Jukeboxes").

In reaching number-one, it would be almost six years before another British artist would top the U.S. pop chart; that song was Laurie London's "He's Got the Whole World in His Hands," in April 1958. Additionally, the song's nine-week run at number one on the U.S. pop charts by a British act was a record that stood for 16 years, until the Beatles matched the longevity record (of nine weeks) in 1968 with "Hey Jude." Currently, "Auf Wiederseh'n Sweetheart" is tied with "Hey Jude" for third amongst longest-running number-one songs by British artists on the Billboard pop charts, behind "Candle in the Wind 1997"/"Something About the Way You Look Tonight" by Elton John (14 weeks, 1997–1998) and "We Found Love" by Rihanna with Calvin Harris (10 weeks, 2011). In addition, for more than 12 years Lynn was the only female solo artist from the UK to have a number-one hit in the United States, a feat finally matched by "Downtown" by Petula Clark in January 1965.

== Demis Roussos version ==
"Auf Wiedersehn"

Single by Demis Roussos

from the album Auf Wiedersehn
- Released: 1974
- Recorded: 1974
- Length: 3:34
- Label: Philips
- Songwriter: Eberhard Storch
- Producer: Leo Leandros

Demis Roussos singles chronology
"My Only Fascination" (1974)	"Auf Wiedersehn" (1974)	"With You" (1974)

Greek singer Demis Roussos covered the song on his 1974 German-language album Auf Wiedersehn. It was also released as a single (in 1974 on Philips Records). The recording was produced by Leo Leandros. The song reached no. 6 in the Netherlands and no. 19 in Belgium (Flanders)

=== Track listing ===
7" single Philips 6009 526 (1974, Austria, Belgium, Germany, etc.)
7" single RTB / Philips S 53796 (1974, Yugoslavia)

A. "Auf Wiedersehn" (3:35)
B. "Walzer für zwei" (3:12)

=== Charts ===
Chart (1974)	Peak position
Belgium (Ultratop 50 Flanders)	19
Netherlands (Single Top 100)	6

== Other versions ==
- Teddy Johnson - a single release (1952).
- Les Baxter - on his album 'Round The World With Les Baxter (1957).
- Connie Francis (1960)
- Jerry Vale - for his album The Language of Love (1963).
- Jim Reeves on his LP, The International Jim Reeves (1963).
- Mantovani - an orchestral version on his album Mantovani Magic (1966).

== See also ==
- List of number-one singles of 1952 (U.S.)
