= Forever and Ever (Demis Roussos album) =

1973 studio album by Demis Roussos

Studio album by Demis Roussos
- Released: 1973
- Recorded: March 1972 – January 1973
- Studio: Gaîté, Des Dames (Paris); Phonogram (Hamburg); Chappell Recording (London)
- Genre: Pop
- Length: 38:16
- Label: Philips
- Producer: Demis Roussos

Demis Roussos chronology
On the Greek Side of My Mind (1971)	Forever and Ever (1973)	My Only Fascination (1974)

Singles from Forever and Ever
- 1. "My Reason" Released: 1972; 2. "Goodbye, My Love, Goodbye" Released: 1973; 3. "Forever and Ever" Released: 1973; 4. "Velvet Mornings" Released: 1973; 5. "My Friend the Wind" Released: 1973

Forever and Ever is the second studio album by Greek singer-songwriter Demis Roussos, released in 1973, by Philips Records. A greatly popular album, it also topped the international albums charts in Germany, Netherlands and Norway and was number 2 in Austria.

== Track listing ==
Forever and Ever – Side one
No.	Title	Writer(s)	Length
1.	"Forever and Ever"	Stélios Vlavianós; Alec R. Costandinos	3:42
2.	"My Friend the Wind"	Vlavianós; Costandinos	3:55
3.	"My Reason"	Vlavianós; Harris Chalkitis; Helen Bank	4:03
4.	"Lay It Down"	Jean-Jacques Cramier; Patrick Kent	3:45
5.	"Lovely Sunny Days"	Catherine Desage; Francis Lai	4:03
Total length:			19:28

Forever and Ever – Side two
No.	Title	Writer(s)	Length
1.	"Lost in a Dream"	Vlavianós; Chalkitis; Cameron Watson	4:12
2.	"Velvet Mornings"	Vlavianós; Costandinos	3:38
3.	"Rebecca"	Vlavianós; Chalkitis; Boris Bergman	3:45
4.	"When I am a Kid"	Vlavianós; Chalkitis; Bergman	3:17
5.	"Goodbye, My Love, Goodbye"	Mario Panas; Klaus Munro; Jack Lloyd	3:56
Total length:			18:48

== Personnel ==
- Bass – Bernard Rosati
- Backing vocals – attributed to "all friends"
- Bouzouki – Orphe
- Drums – P. Jean
- Engineer – Roger Roche
- Flute – Chris Hayward
- Guitar, Twelve-String Guitar – Jean-Jacques Cramier
- Keyboards, Organ, Moog synthesizer – Stelios Vlavianos
- Lead Guitar, Guitar – A. Caracadas
- Photography – Bernard Leloup
- Trombone – Alex Perdigon, G. Conti

== Charts ==
=== Weekly charts ===
Weekly chart performance for Forever and Ever
Chart (1973–1979)	Peak position
Australian Albums (Kent Music Report)	11
Austrian Albums (Ö3 Austria)	2
Danish Albums (Hitlisten)	1
Finnish Albums (Suomen virallinen lista)	1
French Albums (SNEP)	3
Dutch Albums (Album Top 100)	1
German Albums (Offizielle Top 100)	1
Norwegian Albums (VG-lista)	1
Spanish Albums (AFYVE)	2
UK Albums (OCC)	2
Yugoslavian Albums	1

Chart (2015)	Peak position
French Albums (SNEP)	105

=== Year-end charts ===
Year-end chart performance for Forever and Ever
Chart (1973)	Position
German Albums (Offizielle Top 100)	38

Chart (1974)	Position
German Albums (Offizielle Top 100)	22

Chart (1976)	Position
UK Albums (OCC)	3

== Certifications and sales ==
Region	Certification	Certified units/sales
Australia	—	150,000
Belgium	—	100,000
Finland (Musiikkituottajat)	Gold	15,000
France (SNEP)	Gold	100,000^{*}
Netherlands (NVPI)	Platinum	100,000
Greece	—	100,000
Spain (Promusicae) cassette	Gold	50,000^{^}
Spain (Promusicae) record	Gold	50,000^{^}
Sweden (GLF)	Diamond	120,000
United Kingdom (BPI)	Platinum	300,000^{^}
^{*} Sales figures based on certification alone.^{^} Shipments figures based on certification alone.
