= Someday Somewhere (Demis Roussos song) =

Single by Demis Roussos

from the album My Only Fascination
- Released: 1973
- Label: Philips
- Songwriter(s): Alec R. Costandinos, Stélios Vlavianós
- Producer(s): Demis Roussos

Demis Roussos singles chronology
| "Schönes Mädchen aus Arcadia" (1973) | "Someday Somewhere" (1973) | "My Only Fascination" (1974) |

"Someday Somewhere" is a song by Greek singer Demis Roussos. It was released as a single in 1973.

The song was included on Roussos' 1974 album My Only Fascination.

== Background and writing ==
The song was written by Alec R. Costandinos and Stélios Vlavianós. The recording was produced by Demis Roussos.

== Commercial performance ==
The song reached no. 1 in Belgium (Flanders) and Spain.

== Track listing ==
7" single Philips 6009 420 (1973, France, Italy, etc.)
7" Single RTB / Philips S 53741 (1974, Yugoslavia)

A. "Someday Somewhere" (3:00)
B. "Lost in a Dream" (4:12)

7" single Philips 6009 416 (1973, Netherlands)

A. "Someday Somewhere" (3:06)
B. "My Friend the Wind" (3:54)

== Charts ==
=== Weekly charts ===
| Chart (1973–1974) | Peak position |
|---|---|
| Austria (Ö3 Austria Top 40) | 18 |
| Belgium (Ultratop 50 Flanders) | 1 |
| Belgium (Ultratop 50 Wallonia) | 7 |
| Netherlands (Dutch Top 40) | 2 |
| Netherlands (Single Top 100) | 2 |

=== Year-end charts ===
| Chart (1974) | Position |
|---|---|
| Belgium (Ultratop Flanders) | 25 |
| Netherlands (Dutch Top 40) | 72 |
| Netherlands (Single Top 100) | 53 |
