= When Forever Has Gone =

Single by Demis Roussos

from the album The Demis Roussos Magic
- Released: 1976
- Label: Philips
- Songwriter(s): Brent Mason and Stélios Vlavianós
- Producer(s): Peter Sullivan

Demis Roussos singles chronology
"Can't Say How Much I Love You" (1976)	"When Forever Has Gone" (1976)	"Because" (1977)

"When Forever Has Gone" is a song by Greek singer Demis Roussos. The song "When Forever Has Gone" was first released on the B-side of the single "With You" in 1974. Later, in 1976, "When Forever Has Gone" was released as a single itself.

The song was later included on Roussos' 1977 album The Demis Roussos Magic.

== Background and writing ==
The song was written by Brent Mason and Stélios Vlavianós. The recording was produced by Peter Sullivan.

== Commercial performance ==
The song spent two weeks at number 2 in the official UK singles chart in the second half of October 1976, with the number one in both weeks being Pussycat's "Mississippi".

== Track listing ==
=== 7" single "With Wou" (1974) ===
7" single "With You" Philips 6009 543 (1974, France, Germany, Italy, Netherlands, Norway, etc.)
7" single "With You" RTB / Philips S 53804 (1974, Yugoslavia)

A. "With You" (3:16)
B. "When Forever Has Gone" (3:02)

=== 7" single "When Forever Has Gone" (1976) ===
7" single "When Forever Has Gone / Woman" Philips 6042 186 (1976, Germany)

A. "When Forever Has Gone" (3:02)
B. "Woman" (2:30)

7" single "When Forever Has Gone" Philips S 53 804 (1976)

A. "When Forever Has Gone" (3:02)
B. "With You" (3:16)

== Charts ==
Chart (1976)	Peak position
UK Singles (OCC)	2

== Certifications ==
Certifications for When Forever Has Gone
Region	Certification	Certified units/sales
United Kingdom (BPI)	Silver	250,000^{^}
^{^} Shipments figures based on certification alone.
