= Quand je t'aime =

1988 single by Demis Roussos

Single by Demis Roussos

from the album Le Grec
- Language: French
- B-side: "Les oiseaux de ma jeunesse"
- Released: October 1987
- Recorded: 1987
- Genre: Pop
- Length: 3:46
- Label: Flarenasch
- Songwriters: Didier Barbelivien; Pascal Auriat
- Producer: Pascal Auriat

Demis Roussos singles chronology
"Summer in Her Eyes" (1986)	"Quand je t'aime" (1987)	"Rain and Tears" (1987)

Audio
- "Quand je t'aime" on YouTube

"Quand je t'aime" (transl. French for "When I Love You") is a 1987 song in French by Greek singer Demis Roussos. Written by Didier Barbelivien with music composed by Pascal Auriat, it was released as a single in October 1987 and was part of Roussos' 1988 studio album Le Grec. It had success in France, becoming a top-three hit.

== Commercial performance ==
"Quand je t'aime" entered the French chart at number 48 on 16 January 1988, reached a peak of number three in its 16th week, and spent a total of 27 weeks on the chart, 16 of them in the top ten. It achieved Silver status, awarded by the Syndicat National de l'Édition Phonographique. On the European Hot 100 Singles, it started at number 99 on 20 February 1988, peaked at number seven in its 13th week, and fell off the chart after 24 weeks of presence.

== Track listing and formats ==
- French 7-inch single

A. "Quand je t'aime" – 3:46
B. "Les oiseaux de ma jeunesse" – 4:00

- French 12-inch single

A. "Quand je t'aime" (Remix Club) – 5:00
B. "Les oiseaux de ma jeunesse" – 4:00

== Charts and certifications ==
=== Weekly charts ===
1988 weekly chart performance for "Quand je t'aime"
Chart (1988)	Peak position
Belgium (Ultratop 50 Wallonia)	8 (Note: The exact peak position in Belgium (Wallonia) is unknown. The single reached at least number 8, as Music & Media provided the single's ranking only for that week, but it did not reach the top three, given every week by the magazine.)
Europe (European Hot 100)	7
France (SNEP)	3

=== Year-end charts ===
1988 year-end chart performance for "Quand je t'aime"
Chart (1988)	Position
Europe (European Hot 100)	48

=== Certifications ===
Certifications for "Quand je t'aime"
Region	Certification	Certified units/sales
France (SNEP)	Gold	500,000^{*}
^{*} Sales figures based on certification alone.
