= Kyrila =

Single by Demis Roussos

from the album Kyrila – Insel der Träume [German ver.]
- Released: 1977
- Label: Philips
- Songwriter(s): German version: Piet Souer, Ekambi Brillant, Wolfgang Mürmann; English version: Piet Souer, Ekambi Brillant, Robert Constandinos
- Producer(s): Leo Leandros

Demis Roussos singles chronology
"Because" (1977)	"Kyrila" (1977)	"Ainsi soit-il" (1977)

"Kyrila" is a song by Greek singer Demis Roussos. It was released as a single (in Germany) and as an EP (in the UK) in 1977.

The German version of the song was included on Roussos's 1977 German-language album Kyrila – Insel der Träume.

== Background and writing ==
The German version of the song was written by Piet Souer, Ekambi Brillant, and Wolfgang Mürmann. The recording was arranged and produced by Leo Leandros.

The English version of the song was written by Piet Souer, Ekambi Brillant, and Robert Constandinos. Its recording was also produced by Leo Leandros.

== Commercial performance ==
In Germany the song was released as a single. It reached no. 40 on the German chart

The German version was released on an EP titled "Kyrila". It reached no. 33 in the UK Singles Chart.

== Track listing ==
7-inch single Philips 6042 283 (13 December 1976)

A. "Kyrila" (3:36)
B. "Leierkasten auf dem Boulevard" (2:58)

7-inch EP Philips DEMIS 002 (1977, UK)

1. "Kyrila" (3:36) [English]
2. "I'm Gonna Fall in Love" (3:13)
3. "I Dig You" (4:06)
4. "Sister Emilyne" (2:57)

== Charts ==
Chart (1977)	Peak position
Germany	40
UK Singles (OCC)	33
