= Rain and Tears =

1968 song by Aphrodite's Child

Single by Aphrodite's Child

from the album End of the World
- B-side: "Don't Try to Catch a River"
- Released: 22 June 1968
- Recorded: 10 and 18 May 1968
- Genre: Baroque pop
- Length: 3:17
- Label: Mercury
- Composer: Johann Pachelbel
- Lyricists: Evangelos Papathanassiou; Boris Bergman
- Producer: Pierre Sberro

Aphrodite's Child singles chronology
"Rain and Tears" (1968)	"End of the World" (1968)

Music video
- "Rain and Tears" on YouTube

"Rain and Tears" is a song by the Greek band Aphrodite's Child. The song was included on the band's 1968 debut studio album End of the World, and was released as a single in July 1968 on Mercury Records. It became a major hit across Europe, reaching number one in France, number two in several other countries, and entering the top 30 in the United Kingdom and West Germany.

The song was written by Evangelos Papathanassiou and Boris Bergman on the motifs of Pachelbel's Canon. The recording was produced by Pierre Sberro.

The song reached number two in the Netherlands, Switzerland and Norway. In Belgium it reached number one in Wallonia and number seven in Flanders. French-Italian singer Dalida recorded the song in three different versions. With French lyrics as "Quelques larmes de pluie" for her French-language album Le Temps des Fleurs (Barclay 80378, 1968), with German lyrics as "Regenzeit – Tränenleid" for her German-language album Dalida in Deutsch (Barclay KMLP 316, 1969) and with Italian lyrics as "Lacrime e Pioggia" for her Italian-language album Dalida canta in Italiano (Barclay 80396, 1969).

== Track listing ==
7" single Mercury 132 501 MFC (1968, Germany, Netherlands, Belgium, France, Spain, Denmark, Sweden, Norway)
7" Single Mercury MF 1039 (1968, UK)
7" single Mercury RF-1 (1968, Australia)
7" single Philips SFL-1178 (1968, Japan)
7" single Mercury 45-4124 (1968, Greece)

A. "Rain and Tears" (3:08)
B. "Don't Try to Catch a River" (3:11)

7" single Mercury 6033 014 (Italy, 1976)
7" single Mercury 6173 691 (1979, France)

A. "Rain and Tears" (3:10)
B. "I Want To Live" (3:30)

7" single Philips 6060 321 (1982, Belgium)

A. "Rain And Tears" (3:13)
B. "Spring, Summer, Winter & Fall" (4:56)

== Charts ==
Chart (1968–1969)	Peak position
Belgium (Ultratop 50 Flanders)	7
Belgium (Ultratop 50 Wallonia)	1
France (IFOP)	1
Netherlands (Single Top 100)	2
Spain (Promusicae)	11
Italy (Musica e dischi)	1
Indonesia (Aktuil)	1
Norway (VG-lista)	2
Switzerland (Schweizer Hitparade)	2
UK Singles (OCC)	29
West Germany (GfK)	28

== Sales ==
Sales for "Rain and Tears"
Region	Sales
France	500,000
Italy	500,000

== The Hi-Revving Tongues version ==
"Rain and Tears"

Single by The Hi-Revving Tongues

from the album The Tongues
- B-side: "Watermelon Man"
- Released: 1969
- Recorded: 1969
- Length: 2:26
- Label: Zodiac
- Songwriters: Johann Pachelbel arr. Evangelos Papathanassiou; Boris Bergman
- Producer: Zodiac

The Hi-Revving Tongues singles chronology
"Baby Come Back to Me" (1969)	"Rain and Tears" (1969)	"Take Me to the Pilot" (1970)

=== Charts ===
Chart (1969)	Peak position
New Zealand (RIANZ)	1

=== Awards ===
- 1969 Loxene Golden Disc – Golden Disc Award (main award; awarded to the best single of the year)

== Demis Roussos version (1987) ==
"Rain and Tears"

Single by Demis Roussos

from the album The Story of Demis Roussos
- B-side: "Summer Wine"
- Released: 1987
- Length: 3:16
- Label: Zone; BR Music
- Songwriters: Johann Pachelbel arr. Evangelos Papathanassiou; Boris Bergman
- Producers: Ed Starink; Bert Van Breda

Demis Roussos singles chronology
"Quand je t'aime" (1987)	"Rain and Tears" (1987)	"Marie Jolie" (1987)

Music video
- "Rain and Tears" on YouTube

A live version by ex-Aphrodite's Child vocalist Demis Roussos was included on his 1987 album The Story of Demis Roussos on the label BR Music. The song was recorded live during "Goud van Oud Live" on 10 April 1987 in Rosmalen.

The recording was also released as a single from that album (in 1987 on BR Music).

== See also ==
- List of number-one singles of 1968 (France)
