= My Only Fascination =

Single by Demis Roussos

from the album My Only Fascination
- Released: 1974
- Genre: Folk
- Length: 3:40
- Label: Philips
- Songwriter(s): Alec R. Costandinos, Stélios Vlavianós
- Producer(s): Demis Roussos

Demis Roussos singles chronology
"Someday Somewhere" (1974)	"My Only Fascination" (1974)	"Auf Wiedersehn" (1974)

Music video
- "My Only Fascination" (TopPop, 1974) on YouTube

"My Only Fascination" is a song by Greek singer Demis Roussos. It was released as a single in 1974.

The song was included on Roussos' 1974 album My Only Fascination.

== Background and writing ==
The song was written by Alec R. Costandinos and Stélios Vlavianós. The recording was produced by Demis Roussos.

== Commercial performance ==
The song reached no. 11 in Netherlands and in Belgium (Flanders) and.

== Track listing ==
7" single Philips 6009 479 (1974, Germany)

A. "My Only Fascination" (3:41)
B. "Someday Somewhere" (3:01)

7" single Philips 6009 474 (1974)
7" single Philips 6837 188 (1974, France)

A. "My Only Fascination" (3:44)
B. "Say You Love Me" (2:57)

== Charts ==
Chart (1974)	Peak position
Belgium (Ultratop 50 Flanders)	11
Belgium (Ultratop 50 Wallonia)	4
Finland (Suomen virallinen lista)	6
France (IFOP)	9
Netherlands (Single Top 100)	11
