= Velvet Mornings =

Single by Demis Roussos

from the album Forever and Ever
- A-side: "Velvet Mornings"
- B-side: "Forever and Ever"
- Released: 1973
- Label: Philips
- Songwriter(s): Alec R. Costandinos, Stélios Vlavianós
- Producer(s): Leo Leandros, Demis Roussos

Demis Roussos singles chronology
"Goodbye, My Love, Goodbye" (1973)	"Velvet Mornings" / "Forever and Ever" (1973)	"My Friend the Wind" (1973)

"Velvet Mornings" is a song by Greek singer Demis Roussos. It was released as a single in 1973.

The song was included on Roussos' 1973 album Forever and Ever.

== Background and writing ==
The song was written by Alec R. Costandinos and Stélios Vlavianós. The recording was produced by Leo Leandros and Demis Roussos.

== 7th Rio Song Festival (1972) ==
In late 1972 Demis Roussos represented Greece with this song at Rio de Janeiro's VII Festival Internacional da Canção Popular. The festival was held at the roofed Maracananzinho Stadium in front of the audience of approximately 20,000 people.

"Velvet Mornings" was one of the 13 songs that proceeded from semifinals (which were held on the previous Sunday) to the final. Demis Roussos with "Velvet Morning" won a special prize for audience appeal. (The other special prize for audience appeal was awarded to Brazilian Jorge Ben with "Fio Maravilha".)

== Commercial performance ==
In June 1973 the single "Velvet Mornings" was in the top 3 in Spain (according to the weekly music magazine El Musical).

In Greece the single reached no. 1 in the international (non-Greek) singles chart compiled by Hellinikos Vorras and Epikera. (In June the song topped the chart as "Velvet Mornings" and in October as "Velvet Mornings / Forever and Ever", i.e. as a double A-side with the song "Forever and Ever".)

== Cover versions ==
=== Marinella's Greek version ===
Greek singer Marinella recorded a Greek version of the song, titled "Drigi, drigi, mana mou (Velvet mornings)" (Greek: Ντρίγκι, ντρίγκι, μάνα μου, "Drigi, drigi, my mother").

U.S. Billboard magazine reported in January 1973 that she "was to record a Greek version of Demis Roussos's hit at the recent Rio Song Festival, "Velvet Mornings", which she "had been using [...] in her act for some weeks.

Marinella's version also charted in Greece, in October 1973 it was in the top 10 of the domestic (local Greek) singles chart compiled by Hellinikos Vorras and Epikera.

=== German version ===
U.S. Billboard magazine reported in its November 10, 1973 issue: "It appears Marion Maerz is going to have a hit with the German version of Velvet Mornings — the original version was a success for Demis Roussos."

== Track listing ==
7" single Philips 6009 331 (1973, France, Germany, Italy, Netherlands, UK, etc.)
7" single RTB / Philips S 53683 (1973, Yugoslavia)

A. "Forever and Ever" (3:41)
B. "Velvet Mornings" (3:38)

7" single Philips 6009 331 (1973)

A. "Velvet Mornings" (3:35)
B. "Forever and Ever" (3:40)

7" single Philips SFL-1817 (1973, Japan)

B. "Velvet Mornings" (3:38)
A. "We Shall Dance" (3:32)

== See also ==
- List of number-one singles of 1973 (Spain)
