= My Reason =

Single by Demis Roussos

from the album Forever and Ever
- Released: 1972
- Label: Philips
- Songwriter(s): Stélios Vlavianós, Harry Chalkitis, Charalampe Chalkitis
- Producer(s): Demis Roussos

Demis Roussos singles chronology
"We Shall Dance" (1971)	"My Reason" (1972)	"Goodbye, My Love, Goodbye" (1973)

Music video
- "My Reason" (French TV, 1972) on YouTube

"My Reason" is a song by Greek singer Demis Roussos. It was released as a single in 1972.

The song was included on Roussos' 1973 album Forever and Ever.

== Background and writing ==
The song was written by Stélios Vlavianós, Harry Chalkitis. The recording was produced by Demis Roussos.

There is also a Spanish-language version, titled "Mi razon".

== Commercial performance ==
The song reached no. 1 in Netherlands and no. 2 in Belgium (Flanders).

The single also was a hit in Greece. As U.S. Billboard reported in its January 23, 1973 issue, "during the first two weeks of December" the single "My Reason" (Philips) was among "the top disks in northern Greece" "according to weekly best seller chart published by the daily newspaper Hellinikos Vorras.

== Track listing ==
=== "My Reason" ===
7" single Philips 6009 249 (1972)
7" single Philips S 53673 (1972)
7" single RTB / Philips S 53673 (1973, Yugoslavia)

A. "My Reason" (4:03)
B. "When I am a Kid" (3:17)

=== "When I Am a Kid / My Reason" ===
7" single Philips 6009 249 (1972)

A. "When I am a Kid" (3:17)
B. "My Reason" (4:03)

== Charts ==
=== Weekly charts ===
Chart (1972)	Peak position
Belgium (Ultratop 50 Flanders)	2
Belgium (Ultratop 50 Wallonia)	1
Netherlands (Dutch Top 40)	2
Netherlands (Single Top 100)	1

=== Year-end charts ===
Chart (1972)	Position
Belgium (Ultratop Flanders)	29
Netherlands (Dutch Top 40)	25
Netherlands (Single Top 100)	23

== Cover versions ==
The song was covered in Turkish (under the title "Sevince") by Tanju Okan.

Also covered by Marinella as "Pou Pane ekina ta paidia"
