= Schönes Mädchen aus Arcadia =

Single by Demis Roussos

from the album My Only Fascination and Auf Wiedersehn
- Released: 1973
- Label: Philips
- Composer(s): Leo Leandros
- Lyricist(s): Klaus Munro (German ver.); Klaus Munro. Jack Lloyd (English ver.)
- Producer(s): Leo Leandros

Demis Roussos singles chronology
"My Friend the Wind" (1973)	"Schönes Mädchen aus Arcadia" (1973)	"Someday Somewhere" (1973)

Music video
- "Schönes Mädchen aus Arcadia" (TopPop, 1973) on YouTube

"Schönes Mädchen aus Arcadia" is a song by Greek singer Demis Roussos. It was released as a single in 1973 and was also part of Demis Roussos' 1974 German-language album Auf Wiedersehn.

There was also an English version of the song, called "Lovely Lady of Arcadia". The English version was included on Roussos's 1974 English-language album My Only Fascination.

== Background and writing ==
The song "Schönes Mädchen aus Arcadia" (the German version) was written by Klaus Munro (from Hamburg) and composed by Leo Leandros. The recording was produced by Leo Leandros.

The credits for the English version list an additional songwriter, Jack Lloyd.

== Commercial performance ==
"Schönes Mädchen aus Arcadia" reached no. 1 in Netherlands and Belgium (Flanders).

== Track listings ==
=== "Schönes Mädchen aus Arcadia" ===
7" single Philips 6009 394 (1973, Austria, Germany, Switzerland, Netherlands, etc.)

A. "Schönes Mädchen aus Arcadia" (3:25)
B. "So wie du bist" (3:35)

=== "Lovely Lady of Arcadia" ===
7" single Philips 6009 518 (1973, France, etc.)

A. "Lovely Lady of Arcadia" (3:19)
B. "Shadows" (3:17)

7" single RTB S 53758 (1974, Yugoslavia)

A. "Lovely Lady Of Arcadia" (3:25)
B. "Let It Be Me" (3:31)

== Charts ==
=== "Schönes Mädchen aus Arcadia" ===
Chart (1973)	Peak position
Austria (Ö3 Austria Top 40)	7
Belgium (Ultratop 50 Flanders)	1
Germany	6
Netherlands (Single Top 100)	1
Switzerland (Schweizer Hitparade)	2

== Cover versions ==
In 1975 the song was recorded by Andy Williams.

== See also ==
- List of Dutch Top 40 number-one singles of 1973
