= Stélios Vlavianós =

Greek composer and musical arranger

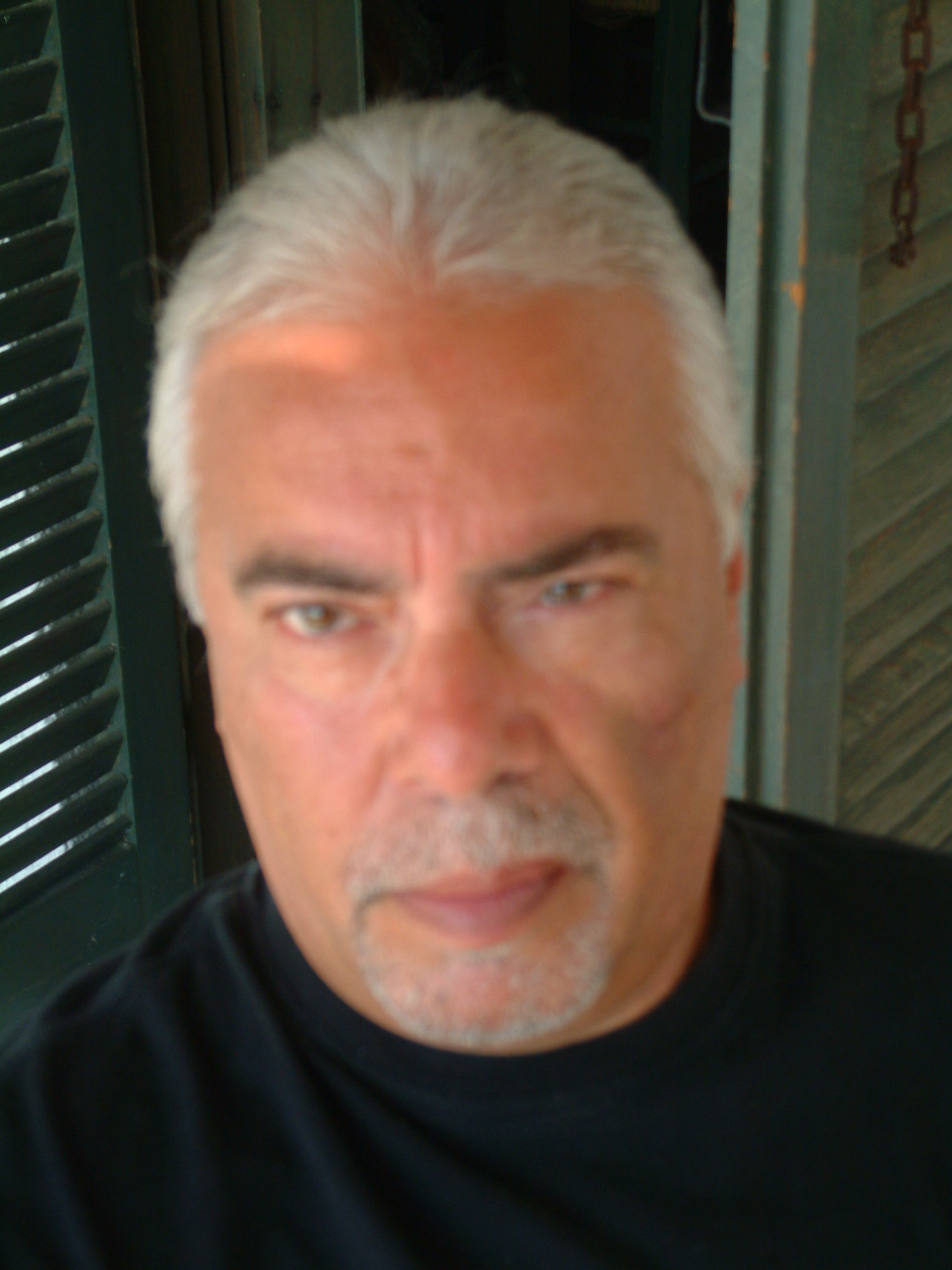
Stylianós Vlavianós

Stylianós Vlavianós (Greek: Στυλιανός Βλαβιανός), often called Stélios Vlavianós, (born 7 July 1947) is a Greek composer, musical arranger, a member of the Sacem and the SACD, among others.

== Biography ==
Vlavianós was born in Athens. His musical apprenticeship began at the age of 3 with his father Stefanos Vlavianos, a musician with the Athens Radio Orchestra (trombonist) and an eclectic theorist.

At the age of 10, he entered the Greek National Conservatory in Maria Hatjopoulou's piano class.

He was later a student with French composer Pierre Petit, then director of the École Normale de Musique de Paris. The master taught him counterpoint, fugue, harmony, composition, orchestration for more than a dozen years before dying prematurely.

In the 1970s, he composed songs for artists such as Demis Roussos, Shirley Bassey, Engelbert Humperdinck, and Al Martino.

His song Forever and Ever was a world success.

1978: He published a book entitled "Guide on Orchestration and Instrumentation". published by Chappel.

In New York, he also composed experimental music pieces with Fred Lipsius (saxophonist and clarinetist, founding member of the band Blood, Sweat and Tears).

In 2007, French pianist Yves Henry, Prix Schumann and teacher at the Conservatoire de Paris, played some of his pieces for piano.

He also composed the music for Les Fabuleuses Aventures d'Ulysse, performed by the Greek tragedian Angela Sonne in several theatres in France.

In 1999, the choreographer Blanca Li used a large extract from his book Impressions of Greece for her show Le Songe du minotaure.
