= We Shall Dance =

Single by Demis Roussos

from the album On the Greek Side of My Mind (Fire and Ice)
- B-side: "Lord Of The Flies"
- Released: 1971
- Label: Philips
- Songwriters: Harry Chalkitis and Artemios Venturis Roussos
- Producers: Demis Roussos and Jean-Claude Desmarty

Demis Roussos singles chronology
"We Shall Dance" (1971)	"My Reason" (1972)

Music video
- "We Shall Dance" (French TV, 1971) on YouTube

"We Shall Dance" is a song by Greek singer Demis Roussos. It was released as a single in 1971. The song was included on Roussos' 1971 album On the Greek Side of My Mind (originally titled Fire and Ice).

== Background and writing ==
The song is credited to Harry Chalkitis and Artemios Venturis Roussos (Demis Roussos). The recording was produced by Demis Roussos and Jean-Claude Desmarty.

There is also a Spanish-language version, titled "Bailaremos".

== Commercial performance ==
The song reached no. 4 in the Netherlands and no. 9 Belgium (Flanders).

== Track listings ==
7" single Philips 6118 006 (1971, Germany, France, Italy, Portugal)
7" single Philips 60 09 159 (1973, Spain)

A. "We Shall Dance" (3:32)
B. "Lord of the Flies" (4:27)

7" single BR 56033 (1973, Netherlands)

A. "We Shall Dance" (4:27)
B. "My Reason" (4:55)

== Charts ==
Chart (1971)	Peak position
Belgium (Ultratop 50 Flanders)	9
Germany	29
Netherlands (Single Top 100)	4
Chart (2015)	Peak position
France (SNEP)	115*

- Charted posthumously in 2015
