= Forever and Ever (Demis Roussos song) =

1973 single by Demis Roussos

- Artwork for the French vinyl single release

Single by Demis Roussos

from the album Forever and Ever
- B-side: "Velvet Mornings"
- Released: 1973
- Genre: Pop, schlager
- Length: 3:42
- Label: Philips
- Songwriters: Alec R. Costandinos; Stélios Vlavianós
- Producer: Demis Roussos

Demis Roussos singles chronology
"Goodbye, My Love, Goodbye" (1973)	"Forever and Ever" (1973)	"My Friend the Wind" (1973)

"Forever and Ever" is a ballad by Greek singer-songwriter Demis Roussos from his second studio album, Forever and Ever (1973).

The song was included on Roussos' 1976 EP The Roussos Phenomenon, which reached no.1 in the UK.

== Background and writing ==
The song was written by Alec R. Costandinos and Stélios Vlavianós. The recording was produced by Demis Roussos.

There is also a Spanish-language version, titled "Eternamente".

== Commercial performance ==
The song reached no. 1 in Belgium (Flanders) and no. 2 in the Netherlands.

== Track listing and formats ==
- French 7-inch single

A. "Forever and Ever" – 3:42
B. "Velvet Mornings" – 3:38

== Credits and personnel ==
- Demis Roussos – producer, vocals
- Alec R. Costandinos – songwriter
- Stélios Vlavianós – songwriter, arranger
- Bernard Leloup – cover art, photographer
- Roger Roche – engineering
- Didier Pitois – engineering

Credits and personnel adapted from the Forever and Ever album and 7-inch single liner notes.

== Charts ==
Weekly chart performance for "Forever and Ever"
Chart (1973–1974)	Peak position
Austria (Ö3 Austria Top 40)	4
Belgium (Ultratop 50 Flanders)	1
Belgium (Ultratop 50 Wallonia)	1
Italy (Musica e dischi)	10
Netherlands (Single Top 100)	2
West Germany (GfK)	26

Weekly chart performance for "Forever and Ever"
Chart (2015)	Peak position
France (SNEP)	68
Hungary (Single Top 40)	33

== See also ==
- List of number-one hits of 1973 (Mexico)
