= Goodbye, My Love, Goodbye =

Single by Demis Roussos

from the album Forever and Ever
- Released: 1973
- Label: Philips
- Songwriters: Leo Leandros, Klaus Munro
- Producer: Leo Leandros

Demis Roussos singles chronology
"My Reason" (1972)	"Goodbye, My Love, Goodbye" (1973)	"Forever and Ever" / "Velvet Mornings" (1973)

"Goodbye, My Love, Goodbye" is a song by Greek singer Demis Roussos. It was released as a single in 1973.

The song was included on Roussos' 1973 album Forever and Ever.

== Background and writing ==
The song was written by Leo Leandros and Klaus Munro. The recording was produced by Leo Leandros.

There is also a Czech-language, a German-language version by the same name, as well as a Spanish-language version titled "Adiós, mi amor, adiós".

== Commercial performance ==
The song reached no. 1 in Germany, Switzerland, Belgium (Flanders), and Spain.

== Track listings ==
7" single Philips 6009 318 (1973, Germany, Ireland)
7" single RTB S 53695 (1973, Yugoslavia)

A. "Goodbye, My Love, Goodbye" (3:58)
B. "Mara" (3:59)

7" single Philips 6009 392 (1973, Italy)

A. "Goodbye, My Love, Goodbye" (3:56)
B. "My Friend The Wind" (3:55)

7" single Philips 6009 364 (1973, Netherlands)

A. "Goodbye, My Love, Goodbye" (3:58)
B. "No Way Out" (3:10)

7" single Philips 6009 381 (1973, France, Portugal)

A. "Goodbye, My Love, Goodbye" (3:56)
B. "Yellow Paper" (3:04)

7" single Philips 60 09 400 (1973, Spain)

A. "Goodbye, My Love, Goodbye" (3:56)
B. "Lay It Down" (3:45)

== Charts ==
Chart (1973)	Peak position
Austria (Ö3 Austria Top 40)	2
Belgium (Ultratop 50 Flanders)	1
Germany	1
Netherlands (Single Top 100)	2
Norway (VG-lista)	3
Spain	1
Switzerland (Schweizer Hitparade)	1
Chart (2015)	Peak position
France (SNEP)	98*

* Charted posthumously in 2015

== Certifications ==
Region	Certification	Certified units/sales
France (SNEP)	Gold	500,000^{*}
^{*} Sales figures based on certification alone.

== See also ==
- List of number-one singles of 1974 (Spain)
- List of number-one singles from 1968 to 1979 (Switzerland)
