= My Friend the Wind =

"My Friend The Wind"

Single by Demis Roussos

from the album Forever and Ever
- Released: 1973
- Label: Philips
- Songwriters: Alec R. Costandinos, Stélios Vlavianós
- Producer: Demis Roussos

Demis Roussos singles chronology
"Forever and Ever" / "Velvet Mornings" (1973)	"My Friend The Wind" (1973)	"Schönes Mädchen aus Arcadia" (1973)

Music video
- "My Friend the Wind" (TopPop, 1973) on YouTube

"My Friend The Wind" is a song by Greek singer Demis Roussos. It was released as a single in 1973.

The song was included on Roussos' 1973 album Forever and Ever.

== Background and writing ==
The song was written by Alec R. Costandinos and Stélios Vlavianós. The recording was produced by Demis Roussos.

There is also a Spanish-language version, titled "Mi amigo el viento".

== Commercial performance ==
The song reached no. 1 in the Netherlands and Belgium (Flanders).

== Track listings ==
7" single Philips 6009 388 (1973, Germany)
7" single RTB / Philips S 53.713 (1973, Yugoslavia)

A. "My Friend The Wind" (3:58)
B. "Lay It Down" (3:45)

7" single Philips 6009 416 (1973, Netherlands)

A. "My Friend The Wind" (3:54)
B. "Someday Somewhere" (3:06)

7" single Philips 6042 468 (1979, Austria)

A. "My Friend The Wind" (3:50)
B. "My Reason" (3:59)

== Charts ==
=== Weekly charts ===
Chart (1973)	Peak position
Austria (Ö3 Austria Top 40)	15
Belgium (Ultratop 50 Flanders)	1
Belgium (Ultratop 50 Wallonia)	2
Netherlands (Dutch Top 40)	1
Netherlands (Single Top 100)	1
New Zealand (Listener)	11
West Germany (GfK)	7

=== Year-end charts ===
Chart (1973)	Position
Belgium (Ultratop Flanders)	8
Netherlands (Dutch Top 40)	5
Netherlands (Single Top 100)	5

== Covers ==
Engelbert Humperdinck covered the song on his 1974 covers album also titles My Friend the Wind on Decca Records. Croatian tenor Nenad Kero also did a cover of the song in 1996, released under the title "Daleko mi najdraži dom".

== See also ==
- List of Dutch Top 40 number-one singles of 1973
