= Demis Roussos =

Greek musician (1946–2015)

- Ντέμης Ρούσσος
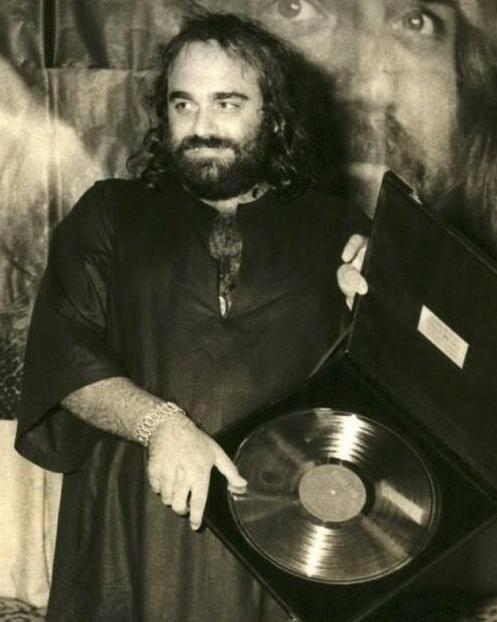
- Roussos in 1975
- Born: Artemios Ventouris-Roussos; 15 June 1946; Alexandria, Egypt
- Died: 25 January 2015 (aged 68); Ygeia Hospital, Marousi, Greece
- Resting place: First Cemetery of Athens
- Occupations: Musician; singer; songwriter
- Years active: 1963–2014
- Musical career
- Genres: Folk-pop; world; folk rock; rock; progressive; schlager
- Instruments: Vocals; bass guitar; guitar; trumpet
- Labels: Mercury; Philips; Universal; EMI
- Formerly of: Aphrodite's Child

Artemios "Demis" Ventouris-Roussos (/ˈruːsoʊs/ ROO-sohss; Greek: Αρτέμιος "Ντέμης" Βεντούρης-Ρούσσος, IPA: [aɾˈtemi.os ˈdemis venˈduriz ˈrusos]; 15 June 1946 – 25 January 2015) was an Egyptian-born Greek musician. As a band member, he is best remembered for his work in the progressive rock music act Aphrodite's Child, but as a vocal soloist, his repertoire included hit songs like "Goodbye, My Love, Goodbye", "From Souvenirs to Souvenirs" and "Forever and Ever".

Roussos sold over 60 million albums worldwide and became "an unlikely kaftan-wearing sex symbol".

== Early life ==
Roussos was born and raised in Alexandria, Egypt, in a Greek family. His father, George (Yiorgos) Roussos, was a classical guitarist and an engineer, and his mother, Olga (1923–2019), participated with her husband in an amateur theatrical Greek group in Alexandria (there were three such groups in the Greek community); her family originally came from Greece. His maternal grandparents were from Chios and immigrated to Alexandria after the Asia Minor Catastrophe. His paternal grandparents were from Chania. His grandfather moved to Egypt in the early 1900s along with his future wife who was underaged. He changed his surname from Ventouris to Roussos to hide from her family.

As a child, Roussos studied music and joined the Greek Church Byzantine choir in Alexandria. His formative years in the ancient port city's cosmopolitan atmosphere were influenced by jazz, but also traditional Arabic and Greek Orthodox music. His parents lost their possessions during the Suez Crisis in 1956 and consequently decided to move to Greece.

== Musical career ==
After settling in Greece, Roussos participated in a series of musical groups beginning with the Idols when he was 17, where he met Evángelos Papathanassíou (later known as Vangelis) and Loukas Sideras, his future bandmates in Aphrodite's Child. After this, he joined the Athens-based band We Five, another cover band which had limited success in Greece.

Roussos's operatic vocal style helped propel the Aphrodite's Child to international success, notably on their final album 666, based on passages from the Book of Revelation, which became a progressive rock cult classic.

After Aphrodite's Child disbanded, Roussos continued to record sporadically with his former bandmate Vangelis. In 1970, the two released the film score album Sex Power (the album has also been credited to Aphrodite's Child), and later recorded the 1977 album Magic together. Their most successful collaboration was "Race to the End" (also sung in Spanish as "Tu Libertad"), a vocal adaptation of the musical theme from the Oscar-winning film Chariots of Fire (scored by Vangelis). Roussos also guested on Vangelis' soundtrack to Blade Runner (1982), on the tracks "Tales of the Future", "Damask Rose", "Taffey's Snake Pit Bar", and "On the Trail of Nexus 6" (several only available in non-bootleg form on the 29th Anniversary Limited Edition CD set released in 2011).

== Solo career ==
Roussos began a solo career with "We Shall Dance" in 1971, which was a top ten hit in both the Netherlands and Belgium. Although initially unsuccessful, he toured around Europe and became a leading artist. His solo career peaked in the mid 1970s with several hit albums. His single "Forever and Ever" topped the charts in several countries in 1973 and was No. 1 in the UK Singles Chart in 1976.

Other hits by Roussos included "My Friend the Wind", "My Reason", "Velvet Mornings", "Goodbye My Love, Goodbye", "Someday Somewhere" and "Lovely Lady of Arcadia". His first UK single to chart was in 1975: "Happy to Be on an Island in the Sun", written by Northern Irishman David Lewis, with the record reaching No. 5 on the charts. His popularity in the rest of Europe, but not the UK, came to fascinate BBC TV producer John King who made a documentary titled "The Roussos Phenomenon" in 1976. Philips Records released a four-song record of the same name, which was the first EP to top the UK singles chart. He was equally successful across Europe, Latin America, the Middle East and Japan.

In 1973, Roussos made one of his earliest television appearances on The Basil Brush Show and also appeared on Nana Mouskouri's TV show in the UK. In 1978 he had his only disco hit titled "L-O-V-E (Got A Hold Of Me)". In 1980, he had a hit with a cover of Air Supply's "Lost in Love", sung as a duet with Florence Warner.

Roussos' run of hits was maintained in the 1980s mainly in France with a number two "Quand je t'aime" in 1988 and "On écrit sur les murs" in 1989, along with golden records for the albums Le Grec and Voice and Vision. Also his Christmas Album and Greatest Hits easily reached the gold status in France, Belgium and the Netherlands. In 1989, he recorded the song "Young Love", a duet with German singer and songwriter Drafi Deutscher, which was released as a single in Germany and reached No. 2 on the German music TV show ZDF-Hitparade in October that year.

In 1982, Roussos released an album titled 'Demis', on which Jon Anderson of the band Yes collaborated. Anderson contributed music and lyrics for Lament and lyrics for Song for the Free and Race to the End. The latter track, with music by Vangelis, is a version of Vangelis' earlier instrumental hit Chariots of Fire.

The 1990s saw even more substantial releases by Roussos. In 1993, he released "Insight" (also called "Morning Has Broken") to general acclaim. After that he teamed up with BR Music in the Netherlands to produce "Immortel", "Serenade" and "In Holland".

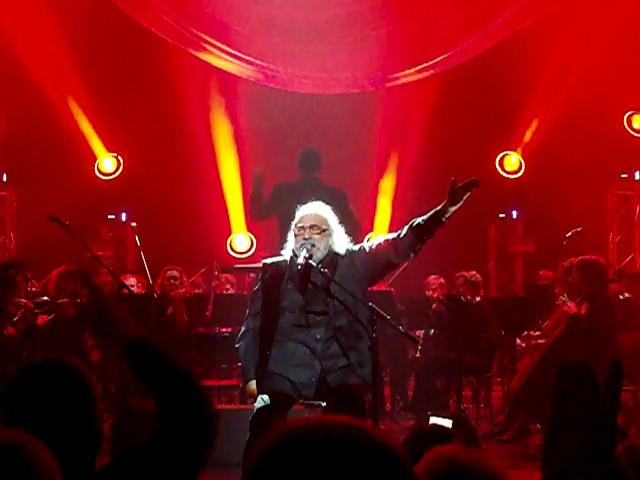
Roussos in Kyiv, 2010

Roussos continued to record and tour. In 2002 he toured England when a "best of" collection, Forever and Ever – Definitive Collection, reached no. 17 on the UK Albums Chart

In more recent years he appeared in Russia and the United Arab Emirates. A committed follower of the Greek Orthodox faith, he sang as a guest in a number of churches in Greece and worldwide, including France.

In 2006, he released Demis Roussos – Live in Brasil, almost thirty years after "Você Você e Nada Mais", a Portuguese hit in 1977. From 2006 to 2008, he was part of the Âge Tendre et Têtes de Bois tour, a series of concerts featuring French singers from the 1960s and 1970s.

Roussos staged a comeback in 2009, when he recorded his final studio album, Demis, produced by Marc di Domenico, released on 11 May. On this album Steve Howe's son Virgil plays drums.

One month before his death, Roussos selected the tracks for an official CD compilation of his life's work, including notes by his two children Emily and Cyril. The CD, Demis Roussos Collected, was released in March 2015. It became a number one album in the Belgian album charts and reached number 61 in the Netherlands.

=== Michel Elefteriades ===
Demis Roussos collaborated with Michel Elefteriades on many songs which Elefteriades rearranged in an oriental fusion; the project was called Demis Roussos & the Oriental Roots Orchestra. This project was first presented at the Mediterraneo Byblos Festival in 2001 and shortly after became an international success in the Arab world later being staged again in Egypt and Qatar. Elefteriades also composed, wrote and arranged the song "The Beast" for Roussos and directed the video for it.

== 1985 TWA plane hijacking ==
In June 1985, Roussos was among the passengers of TWA Flight 847 from Athens to Rome, which was hijacked, but he was released along with four other Greeks after five days while most of the other hostages remained there for 17 days.

== Illness and death ==
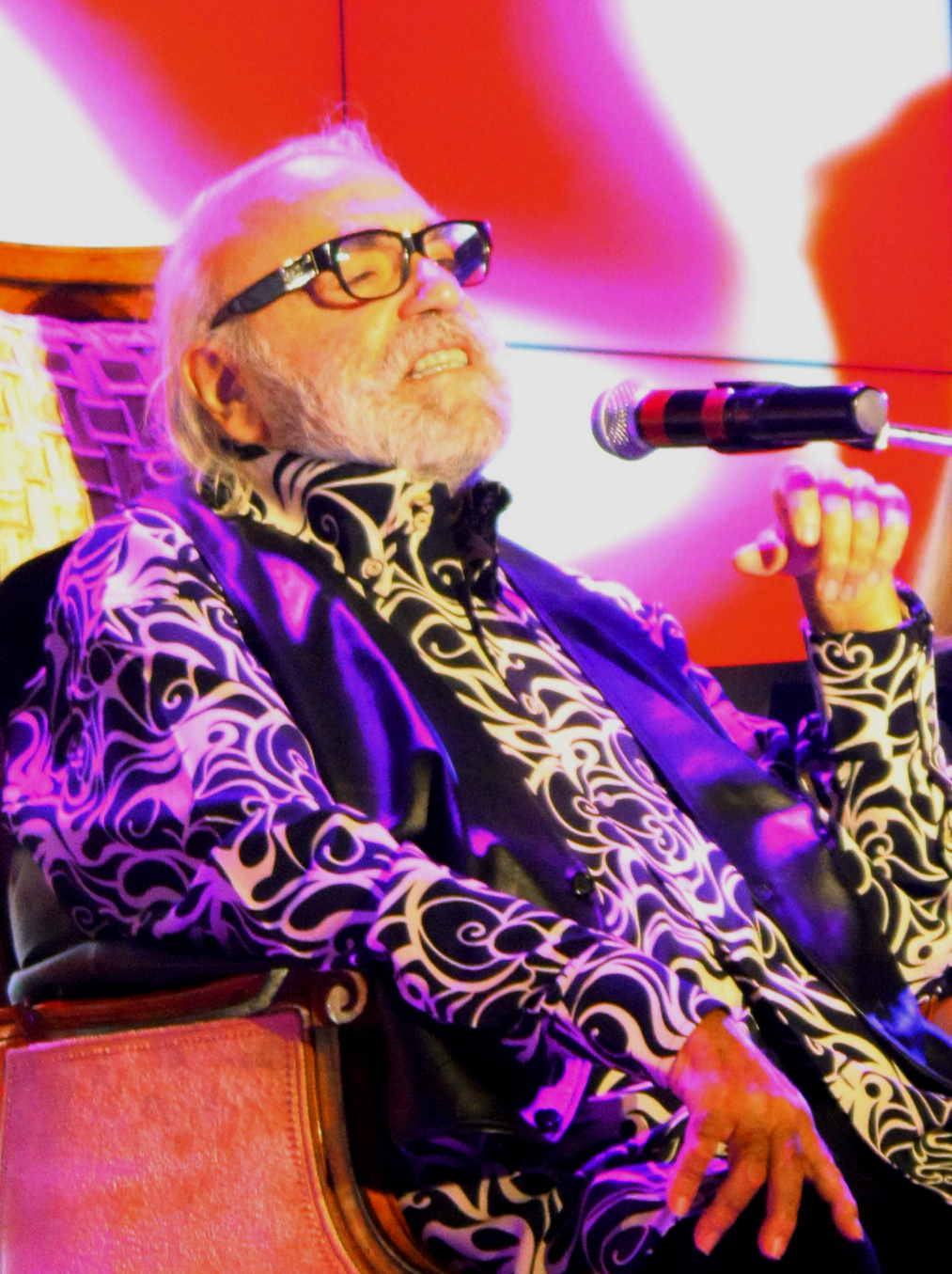
Roussos in 2014

For years, Roussos struggled with his weight. In June 1980 he weighed 147 kilograms (23 st; 324 lb). He then began a diet in which he lost 50 kg (8 st; 110 lb) in 10 months. In 1982 he co-authored the book A Question of Weight with his close friend, the photographer Veronique Skawinska, in which he dealt candidly with his struggles with obesity.

Roussos died in the morning of 25 January 2015 at age 68 from stomach cancer, pancreatic cancer, and liver cancer while hospitalised at Ygeia Hospital. His death was confirmed a day later by a friend, the journalist Nikos Aliagas, who tweeted the news on 26 January 2015 in both Greek and French. His death was also confirmed later on the same day by his daughter, who spoke to Greek and French media.

Fellow Greek singer Nana Mouskouri paid tribute to Roussos on the French radio station RTL, saying "He had a superb voice, he travelled in the world ... he loved what he was doing... He was an artist, a friend. I hope he is in a better world."

Roussos' funeral was held at the First Cemetery of Athens, the burial place of many Greek politicians and cultural figures, on 30 January. The singer Mariza Koch said, "His was a voice which awakened emotions in people and honoured Greece wherever it reached. We bid farewell to Demis." Composer Giorgos Hatzinasios commented, "I can still hear his heartfelt laugh in my ears and I want to bid farewell to him with nostalgia and love."

== Personal life ==
Roussos was married three or possibly four times. He had a daughter, Emily, with his first wife, Monique. With his second wife, Dominique, he had a son, Cyril. Both of Roussos' children are musicians. His third wife, the American model Pamela Smith, now Pamela Roussos-Rațiu (wife of the Romanian businessman Indrei Rațiu, the son of politician Ion Rațiu, married in 2004), was with him during the 1985 TWA plane hijacking incident. His fourth, and last, wife was a Parisian named Marie.

Roussos listed Mozart and Sting among his favourite composers.

== In popular culture ==
Roussos is the subject of an argument between two main characters in the TV adaptation of Mike Leigh's 1977 play Abigail's Party. On the day of Roussos' death, actress Alison Steadman was interviewed by BBC Radio 4's PM and discussed the significance of the music in the play.

On 15 June 2016, his children Emily and Cyril opened the Demis Roussos Museum in Nijkerk, Netherlands. After his death, the museum moved to Greece.

The Bollywood song "Mehbooba Mehbooba" from the film Sholay is based on Roussos "Say You Love Me". In an interview, its director Ramesh Sippy related attending a Roussos concert in London. His wife asked him to incorporate this song into Sholay's music track.

"Forever and Ever" appears in the soundtrack of the 2015 film “ A Man Called Ove” and in the 2020 film Palm Springs.

== Awards and honours ==
- Asteroid 279226 Demisroussos, discovered by Russian amateur astronomer Timur Krjačko at the Zelenchukskaya Station in 2009, was named in his honor. The official naming citation was published by the Minor Planet Center on 14 May 2014 (MPC 88407).

== Discography ==
Among Demis Roussos's most famous songs are "We Shall Dance" (released as a single in 1971), "My Reason" (1972), "Goodbye, My Love, Goodbye", "Velvet Mornings", "My Friend the Wind", "Lovely Lady of Arcadia" (1973), "Someday Somewhere" (1974), "My Only Fascination" (1974), "From Souvenirs to Souvenirs" (1975), "Quand je t'aime" (1987), "On écrit sur les murs" (1989).

Studio albums

- 1971: On the Greek Side of My Mind (a.k.a. Fire and Ice)
- 1973: Forever and Ever
- 1974: My Only Fascination
- 1974: Auf Wiedersehn (in German)
- 1975: Souvenirs
- 1976: Happy to Be...
- 1976: Die Nacht und der Wein (in German)
- 1976: Kyrila – Insel der Träume (in German)
- 1977: The Demis Roussos Magic
- 1977: Ainsi soit-il (in French)
- 1978: Demis Roussos
- 1979: Universum
- 1980: Man of the World
- 1982: Demis
- 1982: Attitudes
- 1984: Reflection
- 1985: Senza tempo
- 1986: Greater Love
- 1987: The Story of Demis Roussos
- 1987: Come All Ye Faithful (a.k.a. Glory) (Christmas album)
- 1988: Le Grec (in French)
- 1988: Time
- 1989: Voice and Vision
- 1991: Photo Fixe
- 1993: Insight (a.k.a. Morning has Broken or Adagio)
- 1995: Demis Roussos in Holland
- 1995: Immortel
- 1996: Serenade
- 1997: Mon île (in French)
- 2000: Auf meinen Wegen (in German)
- 2009: Demis
- 2016: Demis Roussos Complete 28 Original Albums + DVD (28 × CD box set)

== Filmography ==
- 1966: Na zi kaneis i na mi zi? – a singer
- 1969: L'homme qui venait du Cher (TV movie)
- 2012: A Greek Type of Problem – The Pope
- 1982: Tales Of The Future (Movie) Blade Runner (vocalist – uncredited)
