= Audience (disambiguation) =

An audience is:

- a person or group of (usually) people viewing a show (film, play, performance)
- the group to which a work—such as a publication, performance, or work of art—is directed. Target audience.

Audience or The Audience may also refer to:

- Audience (meeting), a formal meeting between a head of state and another person
- Audience measurement

== Media and communications ==
- Audience (company), a voice-processing company based in the U.S. state of California
- Audience (magazine), an American literary journal
- Audience (TV network), a former American satellite television channel

== Music ==
- Audience (band), a cult British art rock band which existed between 1969 and 1972, and again between 2004 and 2013
  - Audience (album), 1969
- theaudience, a British Britpop band of the 1990s
  - Theaudience (album), 1998
- The Audience (band), a German post-punk band
- "Audience" (Ayumi Hamasaki song), 2000
- "Audience" (Cold War Kids song), 2009

== Plays ==
- Audience (Havel play), a 1975 play by Václav Havel
- Audience (play), a 1991 play by Michael Frayn
- The Audience (1930 play), a 1930 play by Federico García Lorca
- The Audience (2013 play), a 2013 play by Peter Morgan

== See also ==
- Audience of One (disambiguation)
