= John Swannell =

John Swannell is the name of:

- John Swannell (footballer) (1939–2024), English footballer
- John Swannell (photographer) (born 1946), British photographer
