= The House on the Hill (album) =

Studio album by Audience
- Released: May 1971
- Recorded: Trident Studios (London, England)
- Genre: Art rock
- Length: 39:10
- Label: UK: Charisma (original release); Virgin (reissue); US: Elektra (original release); Caroline (reissue)
- Producer: Gus Dudgeon

Audience chronology
Friend's Friend's Friend (1970)	The House on the Hill (1971)	Lunch (1972)

Professional ratings
Review scores
Source	Rating
Christgau's Record Guide	C

The House on the Hill is the third album by the British art rock band Audience, released in 1971. At about the same time, a single, "Indian Summer", reached number 74 on the Billboard Hot 100;. The North American version of the album on Elektra Records added "Indian Summer" as the opening track, along with "It Brings A Tear" which had already appeared on the UK album Friend's Friend's Friend. The Elektra LP dropped the song "Eye To Eye".

Both the UK and North American LPs were originally issued as gatefold. The UK gatefold contains black-and-white photos of each band member. The Elektra Records gatefold contains the album lyrics with a photo of the "house on the hill" in the background. The Elektra LP was later reissued in the early 1980s, without the gatefold cover.

The 1991 Virgin Records UK CD release, issued in the U.S. on Caroline Records, used the British LP track listing, adding the single "Indian Summer" to the end of the album. The Elektra Records version of The House On The Hill has never been issued on CD.

"I Had A Dream" was featured in the British TV series, Life on Mars, series 2 episode 6, and on the soundtrack CD.

== Charisma UK and foreign LP track listing ==
Unless noted, all tracks credited to Howard Werth and Trevor Williams.

=== Side one ===
1. "Jackdaw" (Werth, Gemmell) - 7:28
2. "You're Not Smiling" (Werth, Gemmell) - 5:12
3. "I Had a Dream" - 4:17
4. "Raviole" (Werth) - 3:38

=== Side two ===
1. "Nancy" - 4:14
2. "Eye to Eye" - 2:30
3. "I Put a Spell on You" (Jay Hawkins) - 4:08
4. "The House on the Hill" - 7:27

=== Charisma UK single ===
1. "Indian Summer" (Werth, Williams) - 3:16

== Elektra Records U.S./Canada LP track listing ==
=== Side one ===
1. "Indian Summer" (Werth, Williams) - 3:14
2. "You're Not Smiling" (Werth, Gemmell) - 5:22
3. "Jackdaw" (Werth, Gemmell) - 7:20
4. "It Brings A Tear" (Werth, Williams) - 2:53 (originally appeared on the UK album Friend's Friend's Friend)
5. "Raviole" (Werth) - 3:43 (instrumental)

=== Side two ===
1. "Nancy" (Werth, Williams) - 4:20
2. "I Had a Dream" (Werth, Williams) - 4:20
3. "I Put a Spell on You" (Jay Hawkins) - 4:12
4. "The House on the Hill" (Werth, Williams) - 7:31

== Virgin UK./Blue Plate-Caroline U.S. CD track listing ==
1. "Jackdaw" - 7:28
2. "You're Not Smiling" - 5:12
3. "I Had a Dream" - 4:17
4. "Raviole" (Werth) - 3:38
5. "Nancy" - 4:14
6. "Eye to Eye" - 2:30
7. "I Put a Spell on You" (J. Hawkins) - 4:08
8. "The House on the Hill" - 7:27
9. "Indian Summer" - 3:16

== Personnel ==
- Howard Werth – electric classical guitar, vocals
- Keith Gemmell – tenor saxophone, recorder, clarinet, flute
- Trevor Williams – bass, vocals
- Tony Connor – drums, percussion, vibes, vocals

Additional personnel

- Gus Dudgeon – maracas and cowbell
- Robert Kirby – string arrangement and conducting for "Raviole"
- Members of the LSO – strings on "Raviole"
- Gus Dudgeon – producer
- Robin Cable – engineer
- Hipgnosis – sleeve design
