= Friend's Friend's Friend =

Friends, Friends, Friend

Studio album by Audience
- Released: May 1970
- Recorded: Morgan Studios and Olympic Studios, London
- Genre: Art rock, progressive rock
- Length: 39:32
- Label: Charisma (UK), (no US release)
- Producer: Audience

Audience chronology
| Audience (1969) | Friends, Friends, Friend (1970) | The House on the Hill (1971) |

Friend's Friend's Friend is the second album by the British art rock band Audience, released in 1970. It was originally intended to be produced by Shel Talmy; however, the band didn't warm to his approach and they opted to produce it themselves.

== Track listing ==
Unless noted, all tracks credited to Howard Werth and Trevor Williams.

=== Side one ===
1. "Nothing You Do" — 4:38
2. "Belladonna Moonshine" — 2:40
3. "It Brings a Tear" — 2:55
4. "Raid" (Connor, Gemmell) — 8:44

=== Side two ===
1. "Right On Their Side" — 5:24
2. "Ebony Variations" (Connor, Gemmell, Werth, Williams) — 5:29
3. "Priestess" (Connor, Gemmell) — 6:14
4. "Friends, Friends, Friend" — 3:28

=== Bonus track on rerelease ===
1. "The Big Spell" — 3:03

== Personnel ==
- Howard Werth — acoustic guitar, lead vocals, banjo
- Trevor Williams — bass, backing vocals
- Keith Gemmell — tenor saxophone, clarinet, flute
- Tony Connor — drums, percussion, piano

Additional personnel

- Mike Bobak — engineer
- CCS — sleeve design
