= Something for the Weekend =

"Something for the weekend, sir?" was originally a euphemistic question asked by British barbers when offering condoms to their customers. It may now refer to:

== Television ==
- Something for the Weekend (game show), a British game show
- Something for the Weekend (TV programme), a British programme mixing cooking, interviews, and general-interest clips
- Something for the Weekend, a sketch comedy show featuring Susie Blake, first broadcast in 1989
- "Something for the Weekend", an episode of The Grimleys

== Music ==
Something for the Weekend (album), an album by The Chosen (1996 Detour records) Scottish Power pop "MOD" band (Donald Muir)

- Something for the Weekend (album), an album by Stackridge
- "Something for the Weekend" (song), a song by The Divine Comedy from Casanova
- "Something 4 the Weekend", a song by the Super Furry Animals
- Something for the Weekend, an album by Brass Construction
- Something for the Weekend, an album by Radio Stars
- "Something for the Weekend", a song by The Distractions
- "Something for the Weekend", a song by Fred & Roxy
- "Something for the Weekend", a song by Dave Audé featuring Luciana
- "Something for the Weekend", a song by Ben Westbeech
- “A Little Something for the Weekend,” a song by Franc Moody

== Other uses ==
- Something for the Weekend, a cookbook by Jamie Oliver
- Something for the Weekend, a novel by Pauline McLynn
- "Something for the Weekend", a newspaper column in The Times by John Diamond
- "Something for the Weekend", a weekly column by IT journalist Alistair Dabbs that ran between 2012 and 2022 in The Register

== See also ==
- Something for the Weakened, an album by Meursault
