= Friendliness (album) =

Studio album by Stackridge
- Released: November 1972 (UK)
- Recorded: August 1972
- Studio: Sound Techniques, London
- Genre: Folk rock; progressive pop
- Length: 41:30
- Label: MCA Records; Demon Records (CD re-issue); Angel Air (CD re-issue)
- Producer: Stackridge, Victor Gamm

Stackridge chronology
| Stackridge (1971) | Friendliness (1972) | The Man in the Bowler Hat (1974) |

Professional ratings
Review scores
| Source | Rating |
|---|---|
| Allmusic | 4.5/5 stars |

Friendliness is the second album by the British rock group Stackridge. The album was produced by Stackridge and Victor Gamm at Sound Techniques, London. This was the only Stackridge album to be released on the MCA Records label both in the UK and the USA.

== Track listing ==
1. "Lummy Days" (Davis) 3:22
2. "Friendliness (Part 1)" (Warren) 2:29
3. "Anyone for Tennis" (Warren) 2:32
4. "There is No Refuge" (Warren) 3:24
5. "Syracuse The Elephant" (Walter, Davis) 8:46
6. "Amazingly Agnes" (Warren) 3:30
7. "Father Frankenstein is Behind Your Pillow" (Warren) 3:35 (Note: Recorded at De Lane Lea Studios, London)
8. "Keep On Clucking" (Walter, Davis) 4:03
9. "Story of My Heart" (Slater) 2:03
10. "Friendliness (Part 2)" (Warren) 1:55
11. "Teatime" (Walter, Davis) 5:51

Bonus Tracks from the 2006 re-issue on Angel Air.

1. "Everyman" (Davis, Warren) 4:27 (b-side)
2. "Purple Spaceships Over Yatton" (Walter, Davis) 6:39 (b-side)
3. "C'est La Vie" (Warren, Davis) 3:21 (b-side)
4. "Do The Stanley" (Wabadaw, Sleeve) 2:54 (single)

=== Deluxe version ===
Friendliness was reissued in 2023 by Esoteric Recordings (through Cherry Red Records). This 2-CD deluxe set includes the complete original album, some of the 2006 additional tracks and a live 'In Concert' recording from 1972. The first CD being the original album and the bonus material contained on the second. Tracks are:

CD 1

1. "Lummy Days" (Davis)
2. "Friendliness (Part 1)" (Warren)
3. "Anyone for Tennis" (Warren)
4. "There is No Refuge" (Warren)
5. "Syracuse The Elephant" (Walter, Davis)
6. "Amazingly Agnes" (Warren)
7. "Father Frankenstein is Behind Your Pillow" (Warren)
8. "Keep On Clucking" (Walter, Davis)
9. "Story of My Heart" (Slater)
10. "Friendliness (Part 2)" (Warren)
11. "Teatime" (Walter, Davis)

CD 2

1. "Slark" (single version) (not included on the 2006 reissue) (Note: MCA single MKS 5091, May 1972, A-side)
2. "Purple Spaceships Over Yatton" (Walter, Davis) 6:39 (Note: MCA single MKS 5091, May 1972, B-side)
3. "Introduction – Hit and Miss" (Theme from Juke Box Jury) (Note: Tracks 3–10 recorded for BBC Radio One "In Concert", at BBC Paris Theatre, 15 June 1972)
4. "Grande Piano"
5. "Teatime"
6. "Lummy Days"
7. "Amazingly Agnes"
8. "32 West Mall"
9. "She Taught Me How to Yodel"
10. "Four Poster Bed (Let There Be Lids)"
11. "C'est La Vie" (Warren, Davis) (Note: MCA single MUS 1128, February 1973, B-side)
12. "Do The Stanley" (Wabadaw, Sleeve) (Note: MCA single MUS 1128, February 1973, A-side)

== Personnel ==
- Andy Cresswell-Davis – guitar, vocals, keyboards
- James Warren – guitar, vocals; bass on "Keep on Clucking"
- Michael "Mutter" Slater – flute, vocals; piano on "Story of My Heart"
- Michael Evans – violin, cello, vocals
- Jim "Crun" Walter – bass; guitar on "Keep on Clucking"
- Billy "Sparkle" Bent – drums
