= The Man in the Bowler Hat =

The Man In the Bowler Hat

Studio album by Stackridge
- Released: February 1974 (UK)
- Recorded: July – September 1973
- Genres: Pop; folk rock; progressive rock
- Length: 35:20
- Labels: MCA Records; Demon Records (CD re-issue); Angel Air (CD re-issue)
- Producer: George Martin

Stackridge chronology
Friendliness (1972)	The Man In the Bowler Hat (1974)	Extravaganza (1975)

Professional ratings
Review scores
Source	Rating
Allmusic	3/5 stars
Christgau's Record Guide	C+

The Man In the Bowler Hat is the third album by the British rock group Stackridge. The album was produced by George Martin at AIR Studios, London and released in the UK by MCA Records. This was their highest charting album, peaking at number 23 in the UK Albums Chart.

A different version of the album was released by Sire Records in the US and Canada under the title Pinafore Days. The US album removed two songs and replaced them with two others (produced by Tony Ashton) from the UK version of the next Stackridge album Extravaganza. Although the front cover was the same, the jacket photos were changed to show the Extravaganza lineup. Pinafore Days was the only US chart entry for Stackridge, reaching number 191 on the Billboard 200 albums chart.

"Dangerous Bacon" b/w "The Last Plimsoll" was released as a single in the UK.

== Track listing ==
All songs credited to Andy Davis, Smegmakovitch except where noted.

=== Side one ===
1. "Fundamentally Yours"
2. "Pinafore Days" (Mutter Slater, Smegmakovitch)
3. "The Last Plimsoll"
4. "To the Sun and the Moon" (Mutter Slater, Graham Denman)
5. "The Road to Venezuela"

=== Side two ===
1. "The Galloping Gaucho" (Mutter Slater, Smegmakovitch)
2. "Humiliation" (James Warren)
3. "Dangerous Bacon" (Warren, Smegmakovitch)
4. "The Indifferent Hedgehog" (Davis, Graham Smith)
5. "God Speed the Plough" (Wabadaw Sleeve)

=== Track listing: U.S. version "Pinafore Days", Sire Records SASD-7503 ===
All songs credited to Andy Davis, Smegmakovitch except where noted.

1. "Fundamentally Yours"
2. "Pinafore Days" (Mutter Slater, Smegmakovitch)
3. "The Last Plimsoll"
4. "Spin 'Round The Room" (Rod Bowkett, Lucy Vernon)
5. "The Road To Venezuela"
6. "The Galloping Gaucho" (Mutter Slater, Smegmakovitch)
7. "Humiliation" (Warren)
8. "Dangerous Bacon" (Warren, Smegmakovitch)
9. "One Rainy July Morning" (original title: "Highbury Incident (Rainy July Morning)") (Davis, Slater, Bowkett)
10. "God Speed The Plough" (Sleeve)

Bonus tracks on the 1996 CD re-issue on Demon Records

1. "Do the Stanley" (single) (Davis, Warren, Slater, Crun Walter)
2. "C'est la Vie" (b-side) (Davis, Warren)
3. "Let There Be Lids" (first released in the UK compilation album Do The Stanley) (traditional)

=== Deluxe version ===
The Man in the Bowler Hat was reissued in 2023 by Esoteric Recordings (through Cherry Red Records). The first CD includes the complete original album, the songs credited to Andy Davis, Smegmakovitch unless otherwise specified. The 2nd CD contains two BBC Radio One recordings made in 1973. Tracks are:

CD 1

1. "Fundamentally Yours"
2. "Pinafore Days" (Mutter Slater, Smegmakovitch)
3. "The Last Plimsoll"
4. "To the Sun and the Moon" (Mutter Slater, Graham Denman)
5. "The Road to Venezuela"
6. "The Galloping Gaucho" (Mutter Slater, Smegmakovitch)
7. "Humiliation" (James Warren)
8. "Dangerous Bacon" (Warren, Smegmakovitch)
9. "The Indifferent Hedgehog" (Davis, Graham Smith)
10. "God Speed the Plough" (Wabadaw Sleeve)

CD 2

1. "Anyone for Tennis" ("In Concert" 18 January 1973)
2. "Do the Stanley" ("In Concert" 18 January 1973)
3. "Syracuse the Elephant" ("In Concert" 18 January 1973)
4. "Purple Spaceships Over Yatton" ("In Concert" 18 January 1973)
5. "Twist and Shout" ("In Concert" 18 January 1973)
6. "Dora the Female Explorer" ("In Concert" 18 January 1973)
7. "The Lyder Loo" (Bob Harris session 7 February 1973)
8. "God Speed the Plough" (Bob Harris session 7 February 1973)
9. "The Road to Venezuela" (Bob Harris session 7 February 1973)
10. "The Galloping Gaucho" (Bob Harris session 7 February 1973)

== Personnel ==
- Andy Cresswell-Davis - guitars, vocals, keyboards, percussion
- James Warren - guitars, vocals
- Michael 'Mutter' Slater - flute, vocals, keyboards, percussion
- Mike Evans - violin, vocals
- Jim "Crun" Walter - bass guitar
- Billy Bent (a.k.a. Billy Sparkle) - drums

Additional personnel

- Reg Leopold - violin
- William Reid - violin
- Graeme Scott - viola
- Vivian Joseph - cello
- Jack Emblow - accordion
- Ray Davies - trumpet/cornet
- Derek Taylor - french horn and solo on "To the Sun and the Moon"
- B. Lamb - trombone
- M. Fry - tuba
- R. Chamberlain - clarinet/saxes
- Andy Mackay - sax on "Dangerous Bacon"

Production

- George Martin - production, orchestration and piano on "Humiliation" and "The Indifferent Hedgehog"

== Other credits ==
- Bill Price - engineering
- John Kosh - cover design
- John Swannell - cover photography
- AIR London - studios
- Big Ben Music/Christchurch Music - publishing
