= Lunch (album) =

Studio album by Audience
- Released: February 1972
- Recorded: November 1971 and January 1972
- Studio: Trident (London, England)
- Genre: Art rock
- Length: 34:33
- Label: Charisma (UK); Elektra (US)
- Producer: Gus Dudgeon

Audience chronology
The House on the Hill (1971)	Lunch (1972)

Professional ratings
Review scores
Source	Rating
The Rolling Stone Record Guide	0/5 stars

Lunch is the fourth album by the British art rock band Audience, released in 1972.

== Overview ==
It was their last original release following the departure of Keith Gemmell and the band's breaking up for more than 30 years. It was their first charting album, peaking at No. 175 on the Billboard 200 chart.

== Track listing ==
Unless otherwise noted, all tracks are credited to Howard Werth and Trevor Williams.

=== Side one ===
1. "Stand by the Door" (Werth) - 3:56
2. "Seven Sore Bruises" - 2:37
3. "Hula Girl" (Gemmell, Werth) - 2:40
4. "Ain't the Man You Need" - 3:20
5. "In Accord" (Connor, Gemmell, Williams)- 4:55

=== Side two ===
1. "Barracuda Dan" - 2:15
2. "Thunder and Lightnin'" (Werth) - 3:37
3. "Party Games" - 3:20
4. "Trombone Gulch" - 2:43
5. "Buy Me An Island" (Werth) - 5:10

== Personnel ==
- Tony Connor - drums, vibes and marimba
- Trevor Williams - bass guitar, accordion and vocals
- Howard Werth - vocals and guitar
- Keith Gemmell - tenor saxophone, clarinet, recorder and flute
- Nick Judd - piano
- Bobby Keys - tenor saxophone
- Jim Price - trumpet and trombone
- Gus Dudgeon - producer
- David Hentschel - engineer
- Hipgnosis - sleeve design

== Charts ==
Chart (1972)	Peak position
US Billboard Top LPs	175
