= Stackridge (album) =

1971 debut studio album by Stackridge

Studio album by Stackridge
- Released: 6 August 1971 (U.K.)
- Recorded: March – April 1971
- Genre: Folk rock
- Length: 50:34
- Labels: MCA; Decca; Demon (CD-reissue); Angel Air (CD-reissue)
- Producer: Fritz Freyer

Stackridge chronology
Stackridge (1971)	Friendliness (1972)

Stackridge is the 1971 debut album by the English group Stackridge. It was one of the first releases on the MCA Records label in the U.K. It first appeared on CD in 1997, released by Demon Records in the U.K. In 2006 it was re-issued again by Angel Air.

According to the liner notes of the Demon Records CD the group claimed a wide range of influences including the Beatles, the Beach Boys, Frank Zappa, Syd Barrett, Robin Williamson, the Marx Brothers, Flanders and Swann, Bing Crosby, Tom Lehrer, Gilbert and Sullivan, Frederick Delius, Johann Sebastian Bach and Igor Stravinsky.

"Dora the Female Explorer" and "Slark" were both issued as singles from the album. The album cover design was by Hipgnosis.

== Recording ==
The album was recorded on 16-track equipment at De Lane Lea Studios, London, between March and April 1971 with recording engineer Martin Birch. It was produced by Fritz Freyer. Deep Purple were in the studio next door working on their album Fireball.

The album contains the original 14-minute version of "Slark" which was later re-recorded in a much shorter version for a single. "Slark" was the highlight of many Stackridge concerts, combining as it did folk and progressive rock elements.

== Reception ==
Professional ratings
Review scores
Source	Rating
Allmusic	3/5 stars

== Track listing ==
Side one

1. "Grande Piano" – 3:21 (Andrew Davis, James Warren)
2. "Percy the Penguin" – 3:40 (Davis, Warren)
3. "The Three Legged Table" – 6:47 (Warren)
4. "Dora the Female Explorer" – 3:45 (Davis, Warren, Michael Evans, Michael Slater, Billy Bent)
5. "Essence of Porphyry" – 8:04 (Warren)

Side two

1. "Marigold Conjunction" – 4:58 (Warren)
2. "32 West Mall" – 2:25 (Davis, Warren)
3. "Marzo Plod" – 3:05 (Warren)
4. "Slark" – 14:07 (Jim Walter, Davis) (Note: BMI records (see BMI Work #1353928) list "Slark" as composed solely by Andrew Cresswell-Davis.)

Bonus tracks on 2006 reissue

1. "Let There Be Lids"
2. "Slark" (single version)

On some versions of the album, such as the U.S. edition released by Decca Records (DL-75317), the title of the song "32 West Mall" was shortened to "West Mall." Decca had also changed the titles of songs by other British artists, such as The Who, for U.S. release.

=== Deluxe version ===
Friendliness was reissued in 2023 by Esoteric Recordings (through Cherry Red Records). This single CD deluxe set includes the complete original album, and a different set of additional tracks to the 2006 edition (except "Let There Be Lids") including a BBC Radio John Peel Top Gear session 1971. Tracks are:

1. "Grande Piano" – (Andrew Davis, James Warren)
2. "Percy the Penguin" – (Davis, Warren)
3. "The Three Legged Table" – (Warren)
4. "Dora the Female Explorer" – (Davis, Warren, Michael Evans, Michael Slater, Billy Bent)
5. "Essence of Porphyry" – (Warren)
6. "Marigold Conjunction" – (Warren)
7. "32 West Mall" – (Davis, Warren)
8. "Marzo Plod" – (Warren)
9. "Slark" – (Jim Walter, Davis)
10. "Everyman" (B-side of single)
11. "Let There Be Lids"
12. "The Three-Legged Table Part Three" (BBC Radio John Peel Top Gear session 1971)
13. "Slark" (BBC Radio John Peel Top Gear session 1971)

== Personnel ==
- Andy Cresswell-Davis – electric and acoustic guitars, lead and backing vocals, piano, harmonium
- James Warren – electric and acoustic basses, lead and backing vocals, acoustic guitar
- Michael Evans – violin, backing vocals
- Michael "Mutter" Slater – flute, backing vocals
- Billy "Sparkle" Bent – drums, triangle

=== Other credits ===
- Album cover design: Hipgnosis
