= Extravaganza (disambiguation) =

An extravaganza is a type of literary and musical work. It may also refer to:

- Extravaganza (TV series), an Indonesian comedy and variety show
- Extravaganza (album), by British rock group Stackridge
- "Extravaganza" (song), by R&B singer Jamie Foxx
- Extravaganza (music festival), an event held annually at the University of California, Santa Barbara
