= Toast to Freedom =

2012 song

"Toast to Freedom" is a commemorative song for Amnesty International. It was written by Carl Carlton and Larry Campbell and recorded with contributions by nearly 50 musicians from all over the world. Amnesty International released "Toast to Freedom" on May 3, 2012.

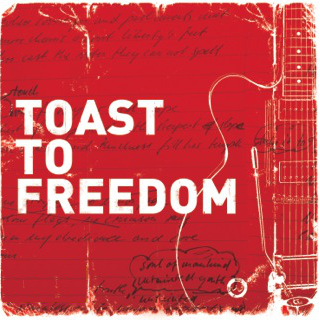

== History ==
Amnesty International concluded its 50th anniversary celebration with the release of "Toast to Freedom", an original commemorative song, performed by a selection of renowned artists. Written by guitarist/producers Carl Carlton (Robert Palmer, Eric Burdon, Keb Mo) and Larry Campbell (Levon Helm Band, Bob Dylan, Elvis Costello), "Toast to Freedom" is the brainchild of Carlton and longtime music industry executive, activist and entrepreneur Jochen Wilms. The two men worked in collaboration with Bill Shipsey, founder of Art for Amnesty, Amnesty's global project that engages musicians, actors and artists around the world to raise profile and funds for Amnesty International.

The song's title is inspired by the story behind the 1961 founding of Amnesty International. British lawyer Peter Benenson claimed that his inspiration for Amnesty came while reading about two Portuguese students sentenced to seven years' imprisonment for raising their glasses in a toast to freedom at a Lisbon bar. In May 1961 Benenson launched the worldwide "Appeal for Amnesty 1961" campaign by publishing front-page article in the British newspaper The Observer. Reprinted in newspapers across the world, Benenson's call to action was the spark that ignited a fire of hope and inspiration in people around the world. It marked the beginning of what has become a global movement of more than 3 million supporters, members, and activists in more than 150 countries and territories worldwide.

== Writing and recording process ==
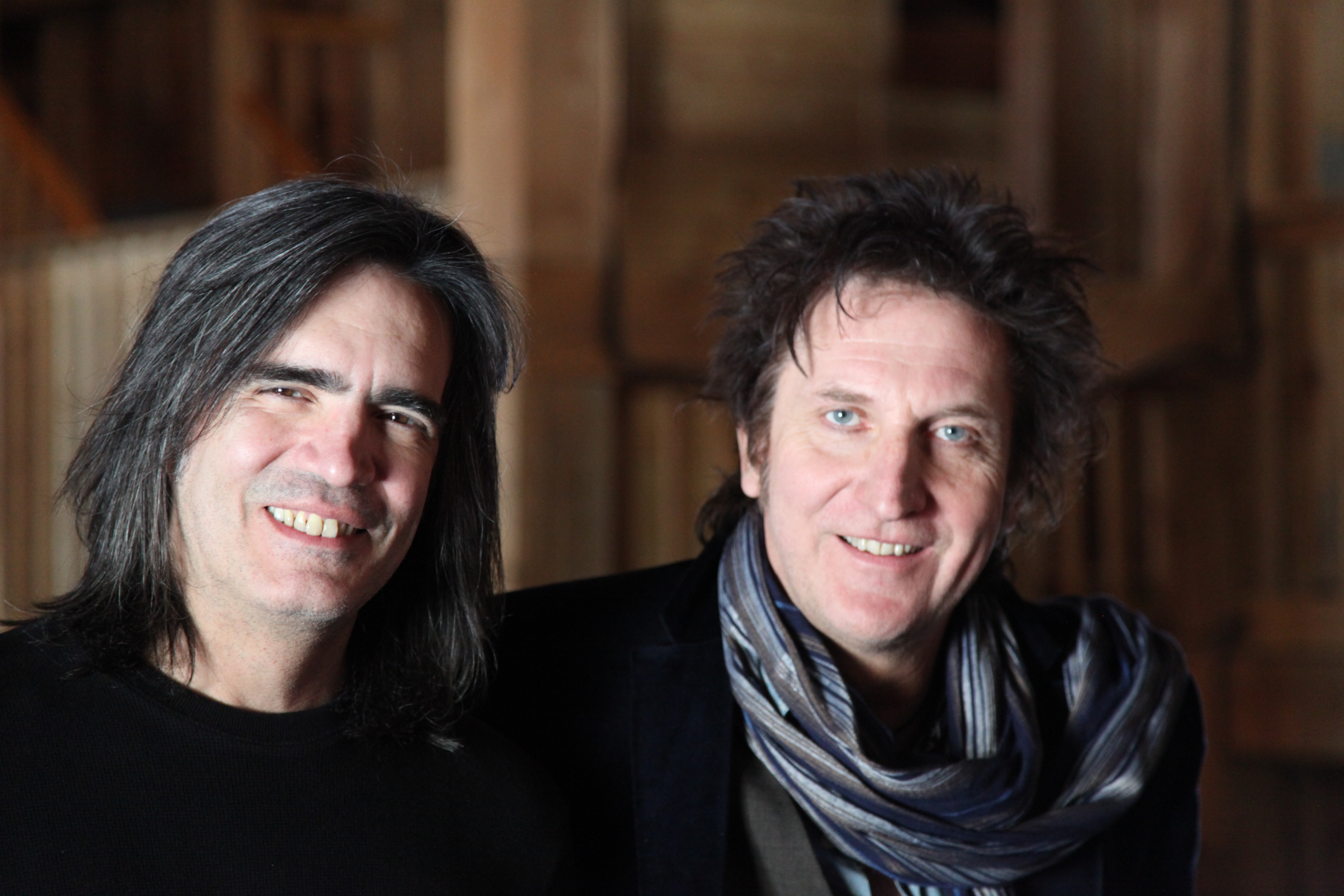
Larry Campbell und Carl Carlton, January 2011

In the spring of 2011 Carlton and Campbell wrote the song within five days in a New York hotel. The basic tracks were recorded at the legendary Levon Helm Studios in Woodstock, N.Y, affectionately known as "the Barn". Internationally acclaimed musicians were assembled to record the song's basic tracks. Additionally, the late Levon Helm corralled a number of his own friends, family members, and collaborators—including Steely Dan's Donald Fagen—who were backed up by Carlton's band Carl Carlton & the Songdogs. Wilms also contacted producer/engineer Bob Clearmountain (The Who, Paul McCartney, Rolling Stones, Bruce Springsteen), who was impressed by the studio's sound and moved by the spirit and passion of the sessions. With the initial track completed, Wilms, Carlton and Campbell called together a diverse collection of voices from all corners of the globe, including Taj Mahal, Marianne Faithfull, Carly Simon, Kris Kristofferson and the actor Ewan McGregor to name but a few.

The host of the recording sessions, The Band drummer Levon Helm, unfortunately did not experience the song's release. He died on April 19, 2012, after a longstanding illness. In a press release by Amnesty International on May 2, 2012, Wilms said about Helm: "Levon was one great soul. I am so grateful we got to work with him, his outstanding band and team in his barn in Woodstock. He was an inspiration and our muse. The song 'Toast To Freedom' is dedicated to Amnesty International, but in a certain way is now a 'Toast To Levon' and a celebration for him as well."

Bill Shipsey from Art for Amnesty said about Levon Helm: "On behalf of Amnesty International's millions of members around the world, I want to say how grateful we are to Levon Helm for his generous artistic contribution and support that will make a real difference to our life-saving work around the world. We in Amnesty owe him a huge debt. The best way to repay that debt to him is by continuing our work. Levon Helm created with 50 international musicians some musical magic for Amnesty. This happens when goodness and love combine with kindness and art to produce beauty and power leading to unarmed truth – still the most powerful thing in the universe."

Slated for release on Thursday, May 3, 2012, to coincide with World Press Freedom Day, "Toast to Freedom" is central to an innovative global campaign heralding the important human rights message behind Amnesty International. A dedicated "Toast to Freedom" website has been created, as well as social network pages on Facebook, Twitter and YouTube with links to the websites of Amnesty International and all contributing artists. "Toast to Freedom" is available for purchase via most online stores with proceeds benefiting Amnesty International.

"Toast to Freedom" is available in a wide assortment of audio mixes, including Global Master Mixes for both the extended version and radio edit. It is scheduled to be available soon in regional specific remixes for South America, Africa, Australia, Asia, Europe and the US.

All stages of the international production of "Toast to Freedom" were captured by filmmaker Natalie Johns of Dig for Fire who is known for her work with such artists as Jay-Z, Peter Gabriel, and The Rolling Stones. The project is featured in a making-of documentary as well as a companion music video.

== Contributors ==
Artists

Amy Helm, Angelique Kidjo, Arno, Axelle Red, Blind Boys of Alabama, Carl Carlton, Carly Simon, Christine & The Queens, Christophe Willem, David D'Or, Donald Fagen, Emmanuel Jal, Eric Burdon, Essie Jain, Ewan McGregor, Florent Pagny, Gentleman, Jane Birkin, Jerry "Wyzard" Seay, Jimmy Barnes, John Leventhal, JP Nataf, Keb Mo, Kris Kristofferson, Larry Campbell, Levon Helm, Mahalia Barnes, Marianne Faithfull, Matthew Houck, Max Buskohl, Moses Mo, Nacho Campillo, Pascal Kravetz, Rosanne Cash, Sari Schorr, Shawn Mullins, Sir Samuel, Sonny Landreth, Sussan Deyhim, Taj Mahal, Teresa Williams, Vida Simon, Warren Haynes, Wayne P. Sheehy, Zackary Alford

Production

Executive Producers: Bill Shipsey, Jochen Wilms
Produced by Bob Clearmountain
Co-Produced and Written by Carl Carlton, Larry Campbell
Engineer: Justin Guip

== Spreading ==
The single's release date saw unprecedented dual performances of the song on both Russian and American television. The very same day "Toast To Freedom" was being performed on Russia's Evening Urgant by Pavel Artemyev, Jenia Lubich and beatbox band Jukebox Trio, the all-star "Art For Amnesty Band" played the song on NBC's "The Tonight Show with Jay Leno". The performance featured bandleaders Carlton and Campbell teaming up with Kris Kristofferson, Shawn Mullins, Theresa Williams, Essie Jain, and Jonny Lang among others.

„Toast To Freedom" has drawn widespread global media attention. The New York Times hailing it as "a heart-warming single". In the U.K., the Sun named "Toast To Freedom" as its "Single of the Week", awarding it 4.5 of 5 stars and noting that "this brilliant charity single brings together a formidable congregation of talent... making up one hell of a supergroup." "Toast To Freedom" has received loud applause from some of the world's top artists, including such longtime Amnesty International supporters as U2, Peter Gabriel, Sting, and R.E.M., all of whom endorsed the track on their official websites. The song is also being played live in concert by musicians everywhere, including the song's co-writer, Carl Carlton, who has been performing it nightly while on tour with German rock icon Peter Maffay.

Artists from all corners of the globe were on hand for "Electric Burma: A Concert for Aung San Suu Kyi", on Monday, June 18 at Dublin's Bord Gáis Energy Theatre. Organized and promoted by Art for Amnesty's Bill Shipsey, the extraordinary event was a celebration of Nobel Peace Prize recipient and leader of the National League for Democracy in Burma, Aung San Suu Kyi. "Electric Burma" included a very special live performance of "Toast To Freedom". The unique multi-artist rendition featured an all-star band led by the song's writer and Electric Burma's Co-Musical-Director Carl Carlton, who said: "It will be a great honor perform 'Toast To Freedom' for Aung Saan Su Kyi. She stands for everything I believe in and fight and write for. She is not only a guiding light but a voice for every soul in this universe in the name of human rights. She is the spirit of 'Toast To Freedom'." Musicians who took the stage in Dublin included Bob Geldof, Bono, Damien Rice, Angelique Kidjo, Lupe Fiasco, Vanessa Redgrave, Jack Gleeson (HBOs Game of Thrones), Singer/Songwriter Yungchen Lhamo from Tibet, violin player Sarah Nemtanu, cello player Vyvienne Long, piano player Romain Descharmes, Riverdance from Ireland and more.

== Cover versions ==
Released May 3 to coincide with World Press Freedom Day, "Toast To Freedom" has since been reinterpreted by a remarkable range of artists. "I am surprised how many professional and semi-professional musicians have contacted me to see if they could produce cover versions to become part of this special initiative," said Jochen Wilms. "Musicians from many different backgrounds are connecting with 'Toast To Freedom'." Among them is Russian rap icon Basta, whose version of the song – dubbed "Svoboda" ("Freedom" in Russian) – is currently becoming widespread in his native country. The nom de hip hop of popular Russian singer/composer/poet Vasilii Vakulenko, Basta created "Svoboda" by melting potent new lyrics with samples from the original "Toast To Freedom" track. Joining Basta on the song is an array of famous Russian musicians, including rapper Smoky Mo, singer Tati, rapper Slovetsky, and singer/songwriter Billy Novik from Billy's Band. "Svoboda" was executive produced by renowned Russian music journalist Boris Barabanov in collaboration with Bill Shipsey, who noted: "There is a hunger for freedom and human rights in Russia that is palpable, more urgent and 'real' than anything we can know or feel." An additional version of "Toast To Freedom" was recorded – both audio and video formats – by the vocal collective of Pavel Artemiev, Jenia Lubich, and Russia's top a capella beatbox group, The Jukebox Trio, the group, which initially broadcast a live version of the song on the Channel One late night show, Evening Urgant.

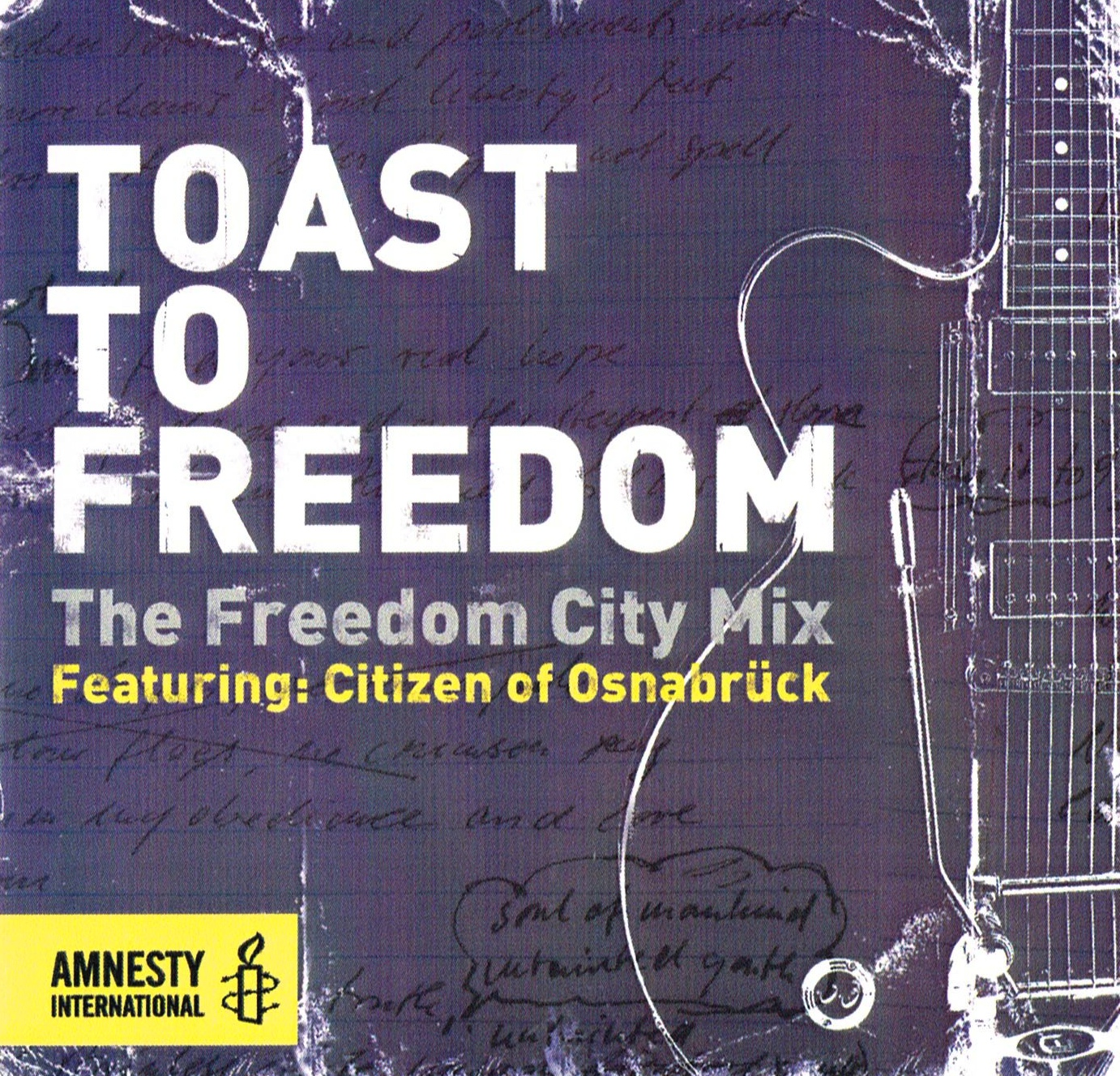

Meanwhile, students at Germany's Hochschule Osnabrueck gathered on Wednesday, May 16, for a communal performance of "Toast To Freedom" by the many visitors to the city's annual Osnabrueck Maiwoche celebration. Inspired by Osnabrueck journalist Heinz Rebellius and organized by Institut für Musik director Martin Behrens, the event saw hundreds of voices ringing out in the Osnabrück town center und were recorded by the students, who added the voice of the citizen of Osnabrueck to their own version of "Toast To Freedom", which they had recorded in the studio of Osnabrueck's Institute for Music. The students arranged their version of "Toast To Freedom" as a contemporary dance song with a faster disco beat, a sampled and looped guitar hookline and with a wide array of local musicians. More than 110 vocal tracks were recorded, and additional performances of well known Osnabrueck musicians like Toscho Todorovic (Blues Company), Heaven (Die Angefahrenen Schulkinder) and the Osnabrueck Symphony Orchestra pay tribute to the multi-artist rendition of the original version. "Toast To Osnabrueck – The Freedom City Mix" was released worldwide on Humans Rights Day, December 10, 2012, including a video. Carl Carlton, composer and lyricist for the original version of the song, also expressed admiration for the "Freedom City Mix" of his song: "Many versions of this song are currently spreading the spirit of Amnesty International throughout the world, and this makes me indescribably happy as a songwriter. The fact that the entire city of Osnabrueck joined in creating this version is something very special. You can see the enthusiasm in the video: the stage performers and audience members practically melt together as one – that's how it should be!" City mayor Boris Pistorius noted that the song fits in perfectly with the history of Osnabrueck, whose town hall famously hosted the "Peace of Westphalia" in 1648. Treaties signed here put an end to the bloody Thirty Years' War. Since then, Osnabrueck has been known as the "Freedom City (Die Friedensstadt)". Pistorius added, "I am convinced that 'Toast to Freedom – The Freedom City Mix' embodies the power of freedom, and now many people around the world will have a chance to hear that."

Coinciding with the release of "Toast to Freedom" in May 2012, Amnesty sponsored a competition encouraging musicians all over the world to enter their own musical interpretations and arrangements of this tune. Of the many entries received, "Toast to Freedom – The Berlin Mix" by the young Berlin artist Luca, was unanimously chosen by the judges as the winner. Inspired by Berlin's own struggles against tyranny, Luca succeeded in creating a moving arrangement of the Amnesty anthem. Accompanied only by sister Maria on cello and by unadorned acoustic guitar and fragmentary bass, Luca's "Toast to Freedom – The Berlin Mix" delivers equal parts reality and rapture. Luca's version was also a clear winner for songwriter Carlton: "The message of the original, which is about each individual's right to freedom and the protection of human rights around the world, is in Lucas’ version transformed into a very personal one. In the original, we used many musicians to create a powerful and colorful sound, and to do justice to a multicultural understanding of rights and freedoms. By contrast, Lucas' version is fragile, sensitive, but at the same time it delivers a very concrete message. This is a young voice coming forward to make the point that the fight for freedom and human rights takes place in our very own back yards every day." Executive producer Jochen M. Wilms says, "Luca's Berlin Mix adds a new and very personal dimension to the artistic initiative. She recorded it independently in Berlin and, together with Berlin cameraman Daniel Devecioglu and co-director Tom Richter, also produced her own video - a truly impressive and moving professional production!"
