= Sex and Flags =

Compilation album by Stackridge
- Released: July 2005
- Recorded: 2002–2005
- Genre: Progressive rock
- Length: 49:49
- Label: Helium Records

Stackridge compilation chronology
Lemon 2002 (2002)	Sex and Flags (2005)	Purple Spaceships Over Yatton: The Best Of (2006)

Sex and Flags is a 2005 album compilation by the British group Stackridge. It was released in the U.K. by Angel Air.

== Track listing ==
1. "It's a Fascinating World" (James Warren)
2. "The Final Bow" (Andy Davis, Sarah Menage)
3. "Someday They'll Find Out" (Warren)
4. "Big Baby" (Gary Gidman, Richard Genovese)
5. "Charles Louis Dance" (Davis)
6. "Wonderful Day" (Crun Walter)
7. "Bread and Water" (Davis)
8. "Sliding Down the Razorblade of Love" (Roger Cook, Andy West)
9. "Dirty Nightingale" (Davis, Ferguson)
10. "Something About the Beatles" (Warren, Menage)
11. "Wildebeest" (John Miller, Warren)
12. "Grooving Along the Highway on a Monday Morning Once" (Miller, Warren, Menage)
13. "First Name of Love" (Warren)
14. "Beating a Path" (Mutter Slater)
15. "It Must Be Time for Bed" (Warren, Menage)
