= Innes Sibun =

British blues singer-songwriter (born 1968)

- Born: 1968 (age 57–58); Bath, Somerset, England
- Genres: Blues
- Occupations: Singer, songwriter, guitarist
- Instruments: Vocals, guitar, mandolin, harmonica, ukulele
- Years active: 1990–present
- Label: Various
- Website: Official website

Innes Sibun (born 1968) is a British blues singer, songwriter and guitarist. He has released eleven albums to date. His most recent was Blues Transfusion (2015).

One music journalist noted "Sibun's name has yet to gain the star power of other prominent guitarists marching blues into the 21st century, but his credentials are eye-popping nevertheless. Aside from playing in Robert Plant's band, Sibun has opened for some of rock's most influential guitarists, including Johnny Winter, Taj Mahal, and Peter Green".

== Life and career ==
Innes Sibun was born in Bath, Somerset, England. At the age of 12, Sibun heard a piece of music by B.B. King which inspired him to learn the rudiments of playing the guitar. In his teens he performed in a number of groups, playing a mixture of musical styles including punk rock, reggae, folk and jazz. By 1991, his then most recent outfit, named the Innes Sibun Blues Explosion, recorded an album, That's What The Blues Can Do. It was produced by Mike Vernon. It was voted the best blues album in Ireland the same year. The success led to the band touring, both in the UK and across Europe. They variously toured with George "Wild Child" Butler, Jay Owens and Johnny Adams, as well as opening up for Joe Louis Walker, Ronnie Earl, The Fabulous Thunderbirds, Walter Trout, The Blues Band, Boy George, and Nine Below Zero. The band later split up.

In 1993, Sibun was invited to take part in Robert Plant's backing band for Plant's tour following the release of his Fate of Nations album. They toured in the US, Europe and South America, allowing Sibun the opportunities to meet and play alongside blues musicians including Buddy Guy, James Cotton, Tommy Shannon, Chris Layton, and Chris Duarte. Sibun's guitar work appeared on Plant's Sixty Six to Timbuktu and Nine Lives compilation albums.

Following that tour, Sibun recorded Superstitious (1995) and Honey Pot (1996), having assembled a new backing unit. Promotional tours that followed saw Sibun open for Peter Green in New York, in addition to touring Europe with Roger Chapman and Chris Farlowe. Two more albums appeared on Provogue Records, followed by East Monroe on Ulftone Music in 2002. Prior to this in 1999, Sibun played on "It's a Fascinating World", the opening track on the Something for the Weekend album by Stackridge.

In 2004, Sibun assembled a new band who played at a number of venues and music festivals before recording Farmhouse Blues (2005). This was followed by Tail Dragger, released by ZYX Music in 2007. His most successful recording to date, Tail Dragger peaked at number 6 in the German blues chart. The following year, shows in Europe included supporting Johnny Winter, Taj Mahal, Steve Cropper and Al Kooper, then an appearance at Bluesfest Windsor in Ontario, Canada. In 2010, Sibun changed pace, self-releasing his acoustic recording, Snake Wine.

Can't Slow Down : Live at the Estrado was issued on ZYX Music in 2012, and Sibun and his band played at the Rory Gallagher Festival in Ballyshannon, Ireland, by request of Rory's brother, Donal Gallagher. They also performed at the Iridium Jazz Club in New York City, to celebrate the release of Gallagher's posthumous Notes from San Francisco album.

Lost in the Wilderness (2013), was recorded in England with Steve Hall (bass guitar), Kevin O’Rourke (drums), and Jon Buckett (keyboards) complementing Sibun's vocals, guitar and production work. The only cover version on Lost in the Wilderness was of Otis Rush's 1958 track, "Double Trouble."

Wes Montgomery and Joe Pass both had a jazz based influence on Sibun, and he used this to effect on Sari Schorr's 2016 album, A Force Of Nature.

In 2019, Sibun teamed up with the Detroit based vocalist Marcus Malone, to create Malone Sibun. Their debut album, Come Together, was released in January 2020.

== Discography ==
=== Albums ===
Year	Title	Record label	Additional credit
1991	That's What The Blues Can Do	MFF Records	Innes Sibun Blues Explosion
1995	Superstitious	Dogonke	
1996	Honey Pot	Viceroy Records	
1997	Stardust	Provogue Records	
1998	After Dark Live	Provogue Records	
2002	East Monroe	Ulftone Music	
2005	Farmhouse Blues	Pepper Cake/ ZYX Music	
2007	Tail Dragger	ZYX Music	
2010	Snake Wine	Self release	
2012	Can't Slow Down : Live at the Estrado	ZYX Music	
2013	Lost in the Wilderness	Music Avenue	
2015	Blues Transfusion	Music Avenue	
2020	Come Together	Redline Music	Malone Sibun

== See also ==
- List of British blues musicians
