= Mr. Mick =

1976 studio album by Stackridge

Studio album by Stackridge
- Released: March 1976
- Recorded: 1976
- Studios: Ramport (Battersea, London)
- Genre: Progressive rock
- Length: 38:25
- Labels: Rocket; Angel Air
- Producer: Andy Cresswell-Davis

Stackridge studio album chronology
Extravaganza (1975)	Mr. Mick (1976)	Something for the Weekend (1999)

Professional ratings
Review scores
Source	Rating
AllMusic	3.5/5 stars

Mr. Mick is the fifth studio album released by the British rock group Stackridge in 1976. It originally was released in the UK by The Rocket Record Company, and its catalogue number was ROLL 3. This was the first album by Stackridge to go unreleased in the United States.

== Overview ==
The album was produced by Andy Cresswell-Davis (known simply as Andy Davis on this recording) and engineered by Denny Bridges. It was recorded at Ramport Studios in South London and mixed at AIR Studios. Pete Gage produced the basic track on "The Dump" and "Steam Radio Song". Some of the keyboards for the album were played by Dave Lawson of the band Greenslade.

The version of Mr. Mick that was released in 1976 had many changes ordered by the group's UK label. Although supported with airplay from BBC Radio 1's John Peel amongst others it was less successful than expected. The many difficulties the group experienced during this time contributed to their break-up not long after the release of Mr. Mick.

In 2000, DAP Records finally released the album in the form the group originally intended: it was entitled The Original Mr. Mick. In 2006 Angel Air released a 2-disc set containing both albums in their entirety.

== Track listing ==
1. "Hold Me Tight" (John Lennon, Paul McCartney) – 3:33
2. "Breakfast with Werner von Braun" (Andy Davis) – 4:05
3. "Steam Radio Song" (Davis, Steve Augarde) – 3:34
4. "The Dump" (Davis) – 1:47
5. "Save a Red Face" (Mutter Slater, Augarde) – 3:24
6. "The Slater's Waltz" (Slater, Augarde) – 4:33
7. "Coniston Water" (Slater) – 5:22
8. "Hey Good Looking" (Davis, Crun Walter) – 4:16
9. "Fish in a Glass" (Davis, Walter) – 7:18

== Track listing: "The Original Mr. Mick" ==
The Original Mr. Mick

Studio album by Stackridge
- Released: 2001
- Genre: Progressive rock
- Length: 45:02
- Labels: DAP; Angel Air

Stackridge studio album chronology
Something for the Weekend (1999)	The Original Mr. Mick (2001)	A Victory for Common Sense (2009)

1. "Hey! Good Looking" (Davis, Walter) – 4:30
2. "Breakfast With Werner Von Braun" (Davis) – 3:45
3. "Mr Mick's Walk" (Davis, Augarde) – 3:55
4. "Mr Mick's Dream" (Davis, Augarde) – 2:10
5. "Save A Red Face" (Slater, Augarde) – 3:25
6. "The Steam Radio Song" (Davis, Augarde) – 3:20
7. "The Slater's Waltz" (Slater, Augarde) – 4:10
8. "Hazy Dazy Holiday" (Slater) – 2:05
9. "Coniston Water" (Slater) – 4:50
10. "Can Inspiration Save The Nation?" (Davis, Walter) – 2:15
11. "Mr Mick's New Home"(Slater, Davis, Augarde) – 3:30
12. "Fish In A Glass" (Davis, Walter) – 7:50

== Personnel ==
- Andy Cresswell-Davis – guitar, keyboards, vocals
- Mike "Mutter" Slater – flute, keyboards, vocals and narration
- Keith Gemmell – saxophones, clarinet
- Jim "Crun" Walter – bass
- Peter Van Hooke – drums
- Dave Lawson – keyboards

Additional personnel

- Ray Russell – guitar
- Joanna Karlin – vocal on "The Slater's Waltz"

Production

- Denny Bridges – engineering
- John Swannell – cover photography
