= Audience (album) =

Studio album by Audience
- Released: December 1969
- Recorded: 1969
- Studio: Morgan, London
- Genre: Art rock, progressive rock
- Length: 40:55
- Label: Polydor (UK)
- Producer: Chris Brough

Audience chronology
Audience (1969)	Friend's Friend's Friend (1970)

Audience is the first album by British art rock band Audience, released in 1969. It was deleted shortly after its release and is now collectable in its original vinyl version. The band was soon afterwards signed by Tony Stratton Smith to Charisma Records.

== Track listing ==
Unless noted, all tracks credited to Howard Werth and Trevor Williams.

=== Side one ===
1. "Banquet" – 3:47
2. "Poet" – 3:05
3. "Waverley Stage Coach" (Williams) – 2:59
4. "Riverboat Queen" – 2:57
5. "Harlequin" – 2:35
6. "Heaven Was an Island" – 4:18

=== Side two ===
1. "Too Late I'm Gone" – 2:37
2. "Maidens Cry" (Gemmell, Richardson, Werth, Williams) – 4:47
3. "Pleasant Convalescence" – (Gemmell, Werth) – 2:30
4. "Leave It Unsaid"
5. "Man On Box" (Gemmell, Werth)
6. "House On the Hill"

=== Re-release bonus tracks ===
1. "Paper Round"
2. "The Going Song"
3. "Troubles" (Werth)

== Personnel ==
- Howard Werth – electric classical guitar, vocals
- Trevor Williams – bass
- Keith Gemmell – tenor saxophone, clarinet, flute
- Tony Connor – drums, vibes
- Mike d'Abo – piano

Additional personnel

- Chris Brough – producer
- Andrew Price-Jackman – string arrangements on tracks A3, B1 & B3
- Paragon Publicity – sleeve design
