= Keith Gemmell =

British art rock wind musician and composer (1948–2016)

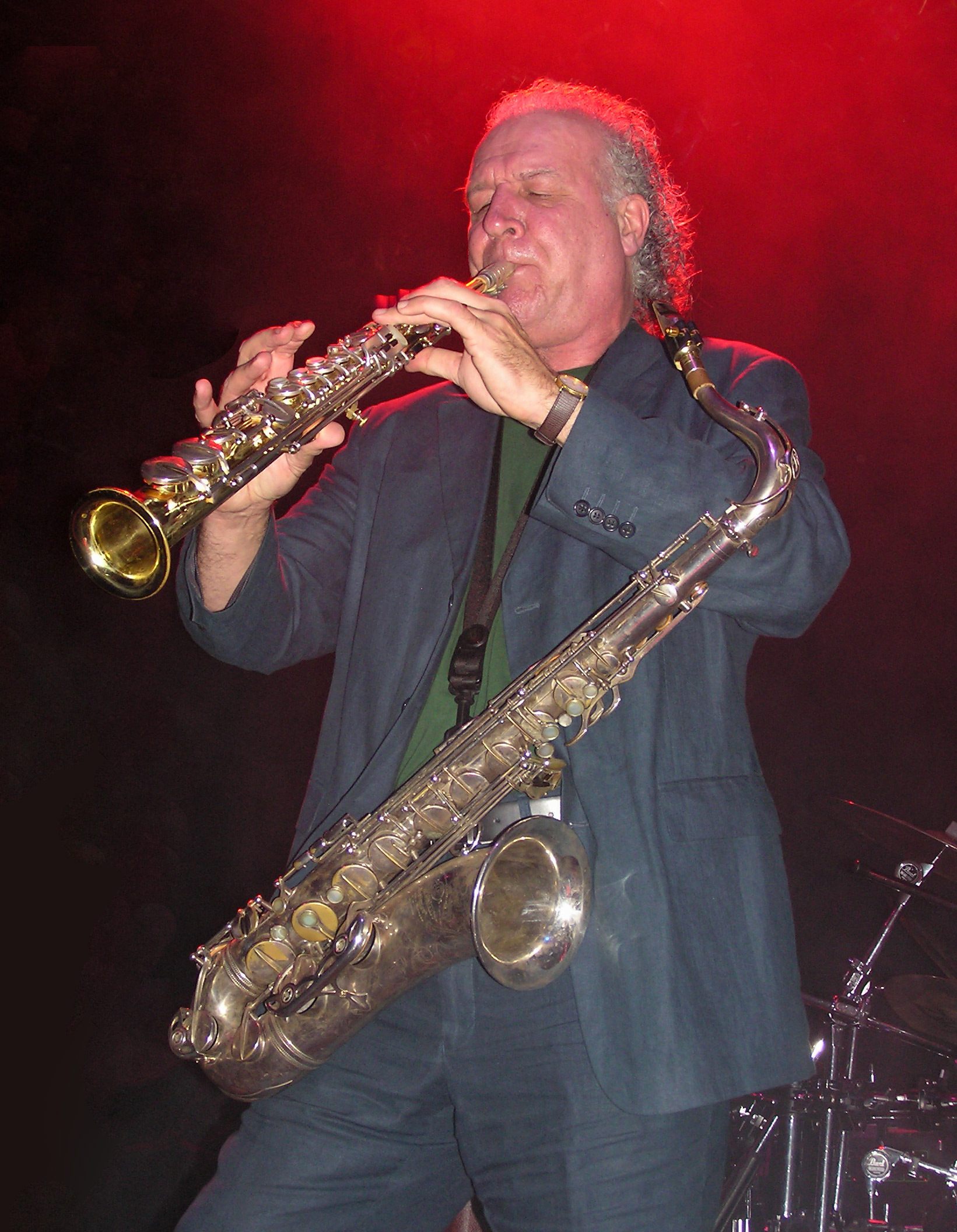
- Gemmell performing in 2004

Background information
- Born: 15 February 1948; Hackney, East London, England
- Died: 24 July 2016 (aged 68) Beltinge, Kent, England
- Genre: Art rock
- Occupation: Musician
- Instruments: Saxophone; clarinet; flute

Keith Gemmell (15 February 1948 – 24 July 2016) was a British musician. He was best known for being a member of art rock band Audience from 1969 to 1972 and from 2004 to 2016. He was also a musical arranger and composer, published digital sheet music, wrote articles for the UK publication Music Tech Magazine, and was the author of several books including the best-seller Cubase Tips & Tricks.

== Early life and career ==
Keith Gemmell was born in Hackney, London. He started playing the recorder at the age of 13 and was later attracted to the clarinet on hearing Acker Bilk's "Stranger on the Shore". He has cited his early influences as the British trad jazz bands of the day, Acker Bilk, Kenny Ball and Chris Barber being the best known names. Upon hearing such bands as Georgie Fame and the Blue Flames, Sounds Incorporated and The Mar-Keys he decided to take up the saxophone and began playing in local bands. Aged 17, he turned fully professional, joining Bognor Regis based band The Noblemen and between August 1965 and May 1966, toured Europe playing in clubs, US bases and the Piper Club in Rome. On returning to the UK he joined Hackney band, The Lloyd Alexander Blues Band, who later metamorphosed into Audience.

== Performing and recording career ==
Formed in 1969, Audience had an unusual line up of tenor sax doubling clarinet and flute, electric acoustic guitar, drums and bass. They had no lead guitarist as such and with the aid of echo loops and wah-wah pedal Gemmell's reeds replaced this traditional rock band role.

After Audience, in 1972, Gemmell joined forces with Mick Underwood, Geoff Sharkey, Paul Simmons and Mick Hodgkinson to form Sammy. Their one and only album was produced by Ian Gillan (Deep Purple).

Upon the breakup of Sammy, Gemmell joined the Roy Young Band. He now found himself playing alongside his teenage hero, Eddie Thornton (former trumpet player with Georgie Fame and the Blue Flames). He became friendly with Eddie and together they played many reggae sessions, along with the legendary Jamaican trombonist, Rico Rodriguez.

After a call from their management, Gemmell left the Roy Young Band for a three-year stint with West Country band, Stackridge, a regular live act in the early to mid 1970s. Like Audience, Stackridge had an unusual line up and quirky but catchy songs. He played on their albums, Extravaganza, Pinafore Days (US only) and 1976's Mr. Mick.

When Stackridge collapsed he left the world of rock bands behind him, studying clarinet with Prof. Richard Addison (principal clarinetist with the Royal Philharmonic Orchestra) for a year. Now living in London, Gemmell joined several big bands, played sessions, played in function bands, on the QE2, taught for ILEA and enjoyed a successful freelance career. He also did a great deal of copying (music preparation) for film composer, John Altman, which kindled his interest in writing and arranging music.

Following the session work, Gemmell joined the Pasadena Roof Orchestra taking the 2nd. alto sax and clarinet chair. They toured extensively and he remained with them for 14 years, (1983–1997). In that time, he wrote many arrangements for the orchestra.

== Later life and work ==
Upon leaving the PRO, Gemmell built a second freelance career, this time as a writer of both words (music technology) and music (composing and arranging). His first book, Get Creative with Cubase, was about recording with Cubase, firstly from a musician's perspective, secondly, from an engineer's perspective. Other music technology books followed and in 2003 he began contributing articles to Music Tech magazine.

In 2004 Audience reformed, and continued to tour and record until 2013.

Keith Gemmell died from tongue cancer on 24 July 2016, at age 68.

== Selected discography ==
with Audience

- 1969 Audience
- 1970 Friend's Friend's Friend
- 1971 The House on the Hill
- 1972 Lunch
- 2006 Alive & Kickin' & Screamin' & Shoutin'

with Sammy

- 1972 Sammy

with Stackridge

- 1974 Extravaganza
- 1974 Pinafore Days (US only)
- 1976 Mr. Mick

with Pasadena Roof Orchestra
sessions

- 1979 The Innes Book of Records
- 1976 Man from Wareika
- 1982 Off the Record

film soundtracks

- 1969 Bronco Bullfrog

== Bibliography ==
- Cubase 5 Tips and Tricks
- Cubase 4 Tips and Tricks
- GarageBand Tips and Tricks
- Keep it Simple with GarageBand
- Making Music on the Apple Mac
- Cubase SX/SL Tips and Tricks
- Get Creative With Emagic Logic
- Get Creative With Cubase VST

All published by PC Publishing.
