= Something for the Weekend (album) =

Studio album by Stackridge
- Released: October 12, 1999
- Genre: Psychedelic pop, folk pop
- Length: 49:49
- Label: Angel Air

Stackridge studio album chronology
Mr. Mick (1976)	Something for the Weekend (1999)	The Original Mr. Mick (2000)

Professional ratings
Review scores
Source	Rating
AllMusic	4/5 stars

Something for the Weekend is the sixth studio album by the British rock group Stackridge. It was released in the UK in October 1999 by Angel Air.

== Track listing ==
1. "It's a Fascinating World" (James Warren)
2. "Ruth, Did You Read My Mind?" (John Miller, Warren)
3. "Something About the Beatles" (Warren, Sarah Menage)
4. "Help Under Doors" (Miller, Warren)
5. "The Vegans Hatred of Fish" (Crun Walter)
6. "Sliding Down the Razorblade of Love" (Roger Cook, Andy West)
7. "The Youth of Today" (Miller, Warren)
8. "Faith in Love" (Warren)
9. "Five Poster Bedlam" (Mike Evans)
10. "Wilderbeeste" (Miller, Warren)
11. "Grooving Along the Highway" (Miller, Warren, Menage)
12. "Someday They'll Find Out" (Warren)
13. "Drinking and Driving" (Walter)
14. "It Must Be Time for Bed" (Warren, Menage)

== Personnel ==
- Mike Evans – violin, vocals
- Crun Walter – bass guitar
- James Warren – vocals, guitar
- John Miller – keyboards
- Richard Stubbings – keyboards, vocals
- Tim Robinson – drums, percussion

Additional personnel

- Innes Sibun – guitar on "It's a Fascinating World"
- Terry Weale – guitar on "Wildebeeste"
- Steve Robinson – backing vocals on "Drinking and Driving"
- Graham Smith – harmonica on "Drinking and Driving"

Production

- James Warren – producer
