= A Victory for Common Sense =

A Victory For Common Sense

Studio album by Stackridge
- Released: July 2009
- Length: 49:49
- Label: Helium Records
- Producer: Chris Hughes

Stackridge studio album chronology
The Original Mr. Mick (2001)	A Victory For Common Sense (2009)

A Victory For Common Sense is the eighth and final studio album by the British rock group Stackridge. It was released in the UK by Helium Records in 2009.

== Critical reception ==
Professional ratings
Review scores
Source	Rating
The Times	4/5 stars

Andy Gill of The Independent said, "The reformed group's new album finds their strengths and weaknesses in full supply, notably their air of whimsical Englishness. Several tracks reflect a wistful sense of lost heritage comparable to The Kinks Are the Village Green Preservation Society." He noted that the album had more of a 1980s sounds to it, but that the latter half of the album featured "the kind of unfocused meanderings that rendered prog-rock old".

== Track listing ==
1. "Boots And Shoes" (Andy Davis, James Warren) – 4:06
2. "The Old Country" (Davis, Warren, Mutter Slater, Crun Walter) – 3:17
3. "(Waiting For You And) England To Return" (Warren, Davis, Glenn Tommey, Slater) – 4:05
4. "Red Squirrel" (Davis) – 5:44
5. "North St Grande" (Slater, Davis) – 3:45
6. "Long Dark River" (Walter) – 7:15
7. "Lost And Found" (Davis, Warren, Tommey) – 4:39
8. "Cheese And Ham" (Davis, Warren, Tommey, Slater) – 5:55
9. "The Day The World Stopped Turning" (Davis, Warren, Tommey) – 11:05

== Personnel ==
Band

- Andy Davis : guitars, vocals, keyboards
- James Warren : guitars, vocals, bass
- Mike "Mutter" Slater : flute, vocals, acoustic guitar
- Jim "Crun" Walter : bass, acoustic guitar

Additional personnel

- Glenn Tommey : keyboards, trombone, backing vocals
- Rachel Hall : violin
- Sarah Mitchell : violin, backing vocals
- Eddie John : drums
- Andy "Codge" Marsden : drums
- Mark Frith : programming
- Chris Hughes : percussion
- Davide Rossi : strings arrangements

Production

- Produced by Chris Hughes
- Recorded and Mixed by Mark Frith and Chris Hughes
- Recorded and Mixed at Ashley Manor, Wiltshire
