= John Swannell (photographer) =

British photographer

- Born: 27 December 1946 (age 78); London, England
- Occupation: Photographer
- Known for: Photographing the British royal family on many occasions
- Spouse: Marianne Lah
- Children: 4

John Swannell (born 27 December 1946) is a British photographer.

== Career ==
Swannell was born in London in 1946. After leaving school at the age of 16, Swannell worked first as an assistant at Vogue Studios and then assisted David Bailey for four years before setting up his own studio.

He spent the next ten years travelling and working for magazines such as Vogue, Harpers & Queen, The Sunday Times and Tatler. During this time he developed his very distinctive, individual style in both fashion and beauty photography.

Swannell provided the photograph for the cover of the 1973 album The Man in the Bowler Hat and the 1976 Mr. Mick album by British rock group Stackridge, and has many other record cover photograph credits to his name.

He is known for his royal portrait photographs. Other portrait commissions have included the 2004 Christmas card for Tony and Cherie Blair; Richard Attenborough, Michael Caine, Christopher Nolan, Elkie Brooks, Bryan Ferry, Norman Foster, Bob Hoskins, Glenda Jackson, Tom Jones, Ken Livingstone, Joanna Lumley.

In 2019, Clarendon Fine Art hosted a major retrospective of his work.

=== Royal photographer ===
During his career Swannell has photographed all the leading members of the British royal family, apart from Princess Margaret.

In November 1994, Diana, Princess of Wales personally commissioned Swannell to photograph her together with her sons.

In February 2012, Swannell was commissioned to take the official photographs of Queen Elizabeth II and the Duke of Edinburgh to mark the Diamond Jubilee of her accession to the throne.

=== Awards ===
In 1993, Swannell was awarded a Fellowship of the Royal Photographic Society; he was one of the youngest members to have achieved this status at the time.

== Charity work ==
On 7 June 2011, Swannell gave an illustrated talk, "My world in pictures", at the Royal Geographical Society in aid of the National Autistic Society.

== Personal life ==
Swannell's mother, Lilly McCann, came from just outside Enniskillen, County Fermanagh, Northern Ireland. He has a large family connection still there in the McCann family.

Swannell is married to Marianne Lah and they have two children, daughter Sophia (b. 1983) and son Charlie (b. 1989). He also has two daughters, Alice and Jane, from his previous marriage.
