= Extravaganza (album) =

Studio album by Stackridge
- Released: January 1975 (UK)
- Recorded: 1974
- Genres: Progressive rock; jazz-rock; music hall
- Length: 42:34
- Labels: The Rocket Record Company; Sire Records; Stallion Records (CD re-issue); Angel Air (CD re-issue)
- Producer: Tony Ashton

Stackridge chronology
The Man in the Bowler Hat (1974)	Extravaganza (1975)	Mr. Mick (1976)

UK. Single label
- label (The Rocket Record Company)

Professional ratings
Review scores
Source	Rating
Allmusic	3/5 stars

Extravaganza is the fourth album by the British rock group Stackridge. The album was produced by Tony Ashton at AIR Studios, London. The band experienced a significant lineup change after its previous album, with James Warren, James "Crun" Walter and Billy Sparkle all leaving.

The album was originally released in the UK on Elton John's label, The Rocket Record Company. Stackridge was the first group signed to the new label.

A different version of the album was released by Sire Records in the U.S and Canada. This version removed two songs already released on Pinafore Days and added "Do The Stanley" from a UK single and "The Indifferent Hedgehog" from the UK album The Man in the Bowler Hat.

Singer and songwriter Gordon Haskell rehearsed with Stackridge for a short time during 1974. Though Haskell decided not to join Stackridge the group recorded one of his songs. Originally called "Worms", the version on Extravaganza was re-titled "No One's More Important Than the Earthworm".

The song "Happy In The Lord", written by Phil Welton, was a cover of a song originally performed by the band Fat Grapple, and released by them as a single in 1975.

== Track listing ==
=== Side one ===
1. "Spin 'Round the Room" (Rod Bowkett, Lucy Vernon) – 2:45
2. "Grease Paint Smiles" (Bowkett, Bathos) – 4:04
3. "The Volunteer" (Andy Davis, Smegmakovitch) – 5:05
4. "Highbury Incident (Rainy July Morning)" (Davis, Bowkett, "Mutter" Slater) – 4:02
5. "Benjamin's Giant Onion" (Bowkett, Bathos) – 4:04
6. "Happy in the Lord" (Phil Welton) – 3:51

=== Side two ===
1. "Rufus T. Firefly" (Bowkett) – 4:51
2. "No One's More Important Than the Earthworm" (Gordon Haskell) – 5:12
3. "Pocket Billiards" (Bowkett) – 4:04
4. "Who's That Up There with Bill Stokes?" (Bowkett, Davis) – 4:36

=== Track listing: U.S. version, Sire Records SASD-7509 ===
1. "The Volunteer" (Davis, Smegmakovitch) – 5:05
2. "Rufus T. Firefly" (Bowkett) – 4:51
3. "No One's More Important Than the Earthworm" (Haskell) – 5:12
4. "Grease Paint Smiles" (Bowkett, Bathos) – 4:04
5. "Happy in the Lord" (Phil Welton) – 3:51
6. "Benjamin's Giant Onion" (Bowkett, Bathos) – 4:04
7. "Pocket Billiards" (Bowkett) – 4:04
8. "The Indifferent Hedgehog" (Davis, Graham Smith) – 3:15
9. "Do the Stanley" (Wabadaw Sleeve) – 2:53
10. "Who's That Up There with Bill Stokes?" (Bowkett, Davis) – 4:36

Note that "Bathos", "Smegmaokovitch" and "Wabadaw Sleeve" are entities invented by the band to signify the whole band. Many lyrics were joint efforts.

=== Deluxe version ===
Extravaganza was reissued in 2023 by Esoteric Recordings (through Cherry Red Records). The first CD includes the complete original album, the songs credited to Andy Davis, Smegmakovitch unless otherwise specified. The 2nd CD contains eight additional bonus tracks recorded for BBC Radio One “In Concert” in January 1975. Tracks are:

CD 1

1. "Spin 'Round the Room" (Rod Bowkett, Lucy Vernon)
2. "Grease Paint Smiles" (Bowkett, Bathos)
3. "The Volunteer" (Andy Davis, Smegmakovitch)
4. "Highbury Incident (Rainy July Morning)" (Davis, Bowkett, "Mutter" Slater)
5. "Benjamin's Giant Onion" (Bowkett, Bathos)
6. "Happy in the Lord" (Phil Welton)
7. "Rufus T. Firefly" (Bowkett)
8. "No One's More Important Than the Earthworm" (Gordon Haskell)
9. "Pocket Billiards" (Bowkett)
10. "Who's That Up There with Bill Stokes?" (Bowkett, Davis)

CD 2

1. "The Volunteer" (“In Concert” 17th January 1975)
2. "Who’s That Up There With Bill Stokes?" (“In Concert” 17th January 1975)
3. "No One’s More Important Than the Earthworm" (“In Concert” 17th January 1975)
4. "The Galloping Gaucho" (“In Concert” 17th January 1975)
5. "Pocket Billiards" (“In Concert” 17th January 1975)
6. "Spin ‘Round the Room" (“In Concert” 17th January 1975)
7. "God Speed the Plough" (“In Concert” 17th January 1975)
8. "Dora the Female Explorer" (“In Concert” 17th January 1975)

== Personnel ==
- Andy Davis (Andy Cresswell-Davis) – guitar, mellotron, vocals
- Michael Evans - violin
- Michael "Mutter" Slater - flute, vocals
- Keith Gemmell - saxophones, clarinet, flute
- Paul Karas - bass, vocals
- Rod Bowkett - keyboards
- Roy Morgan - drums

== Production ==
- Produced by Tony Ashton and Stackridge
- Engineers: Geoff Emerick, Pete Swettenham, Gary Edwards
- Recorded at AIR Studios, London, England 1974
- Remastered under the watchful eye of Andy Davis and James Warren at Sundried Artists by Glenn Tommey during November 2006.
