= Audience of One =

Audience of One may refer to:

- Audience of One, former band of Circa Survive frontman Anthony Green
- Audience of One (album), by Heather Headley, 2009
- "Audience of One" (song), by Rise Against, 2008
- "Audience of One", a song by Peter Ivers from Terminal Love
- Audience of One (film), a 2007 documentary directed by Michael Jacobs

== See also ==
- Audience (disambiguation)
