= Les Baronets =

- Years active: 1961-1972
- Past members: René Angélil; Jean Beaulne (1961-1966, 1967-1970); Pierre Labelle

Les Baronets, briefly known as Les Nouveaux Baronets, was a Québécois musical trio and then duo active from 1961 to 1972.

== History ==
René Angélil, Jean Beaulne and Pierre Labelle met during their studies. They discovered a common affinity for singing, and performed in multiple contests.

In 1961, Les Baronets had their debut in cabarets, singing comedic songs and doing impressions of popular singers. They were originally inspired by English-speaking bands such as the The Four Lads and The Four Aces. The song "Johanne" on their first 45-rpm (1962) was successful, but they became highly popular (to an "unprecedented level" for a Québec band) thanks to their cover of "Hold Me Tight" by The Beatles called "C'est fou, mais c'est tout". They were one of the first Québécois artist to cover the Beatles in French. By then, they were already managed by Ben Kaye.

Les Baronets covered many songs of the Beatles. They became the most prolific cover artists for the Beatles in Quebec, except a few tribute bands. They performed at cabarets, on television and at Montreal's great venues such as the Comédie-Canadienne and the Place des Arts.Les Baronets signed a contract with Vee-Jay Records in 1965, recorded songs and were about to enter the American market, but the label went bankrupt before they could do so.

In 1966, Beaulne's activities as an impresario stopped him from fully focusing on the group, and he was replaced by Jean-Guy Chapados. The band took the name of Les Nouveaux Baronets. Their popularity then declined, until the original trio reappeared at the Café de l’Est in March 1967. They passed under the label Canusa around 1967.

In the following years, Les Baronets performed in the cabarets in American tourist cities such as Atlantic City. In early 1970, Labelle and Angélil continued as a duo. They switched to the Nobel record label in 1970. They were in the musical La belle amanchure. They were actively recording until 1972.

== Discography ==
Singles
| Year | Title |
|---|---|
| 1962 | Arrêtez le mariage/Johanne |
| 1963 | Mon beau rêve/Lise chérie |
| 1963 | Dans tous les pays/On se trouvera |
| 1964 | Les filles sont si belles/Bon, bon, bon |
| 1964 | C’est fou, mais c’est tout/Oh je veux être à toi |
| 1964 | Est-ce que tu m’aimes/Ça recommence |
| 1964 | Je n’aurais jamais cru/Laisse-moi me reposer |
| 1964 | Joyeux Noël/Le père Noël s’en vient |
| 1965 | L’amour ça fait pleurer/Twist et chante |
| 1965 | Je suis fou/C’est le Freddy |
| 1965 | That’s The Way Love Happens/Mine All Mine |
| 1965 | Johanne/Dans tous les pays |
| 1965 | Vive le temps des Fêtes/Cet hiver je n’aurai plus froid |
| 1966 | Comment/Seul sans toi |
| 1966 | Tu es partie/Je n’aime que toi |
| 1966 | Demain/Non, non, non |
| 1966 | C’est fou, mais c’est tout/Est-ce que tu m’aimes |
| 1966 | Ce n’est qu’un au revoir/C’est bon pour la publicité |
| 1966 | Un petit sous-marin jaune/C’est triste |
| 1966 | Cet hiver je n’aurai plus froid/Vive le temps des Fêtes |
| 1967 | Je suis seul/Ce monde plein d’histoires |
| 1967 | L’hymne à l’amour/Avec cette bague |
| 1967 | Secrètement/Mr. Lee |
| 1968 | La même chanson/Ça m’fait quelque chose |
| 1968 | Lady Madonna/Même si tu revenais |
| 1968 | Hello, je t’aime/Amour et liberté |
| 1970 | Bon matin, ma rose/Sympathie |
| 1970 | Si nous sommes ensemble/Tout le monde s’aime |
| 1970 | Cet hiver je n’aurai plus froid/Vive le temps des Fêtes |
| 1971 | Rita mon amour/Les filles |
| 1971 | Tes histoires d’autrefois/J’ai un side-line payant |
| 1972 | Tarzan/La complainte de Tarzan |
| 1974 | C’est fou, mais c’est tout/Ça recommence |
| 1974 | Est-ce que tu m’aimes/Twist et chante |
| 1977 | Le téléphone 75/Crocodile Dance |

Albums
| Year | Title |
|---|---|
| 1963? | Les Baronets en spectacle |
| 1964 | Ça recommence |
| 1965 | Les Baronets à la Comédie-Canadienne |
| 1967 | Les Baronets en personne |
| 1968 | Réveillon chez la famille Canusa |
| 1969 | 15 succès |
| 1969 | Le palmarès des Baronets |
| 1970 | La belle amanchure |
| 1971 | Pierre Labelle et René Angélil |
| 1974 | 21 titres d’or |
| 1989 | Une soirée au cabaret avec les Baronets |
| 1992 | Les Baronets |
