= Sari Schorr =

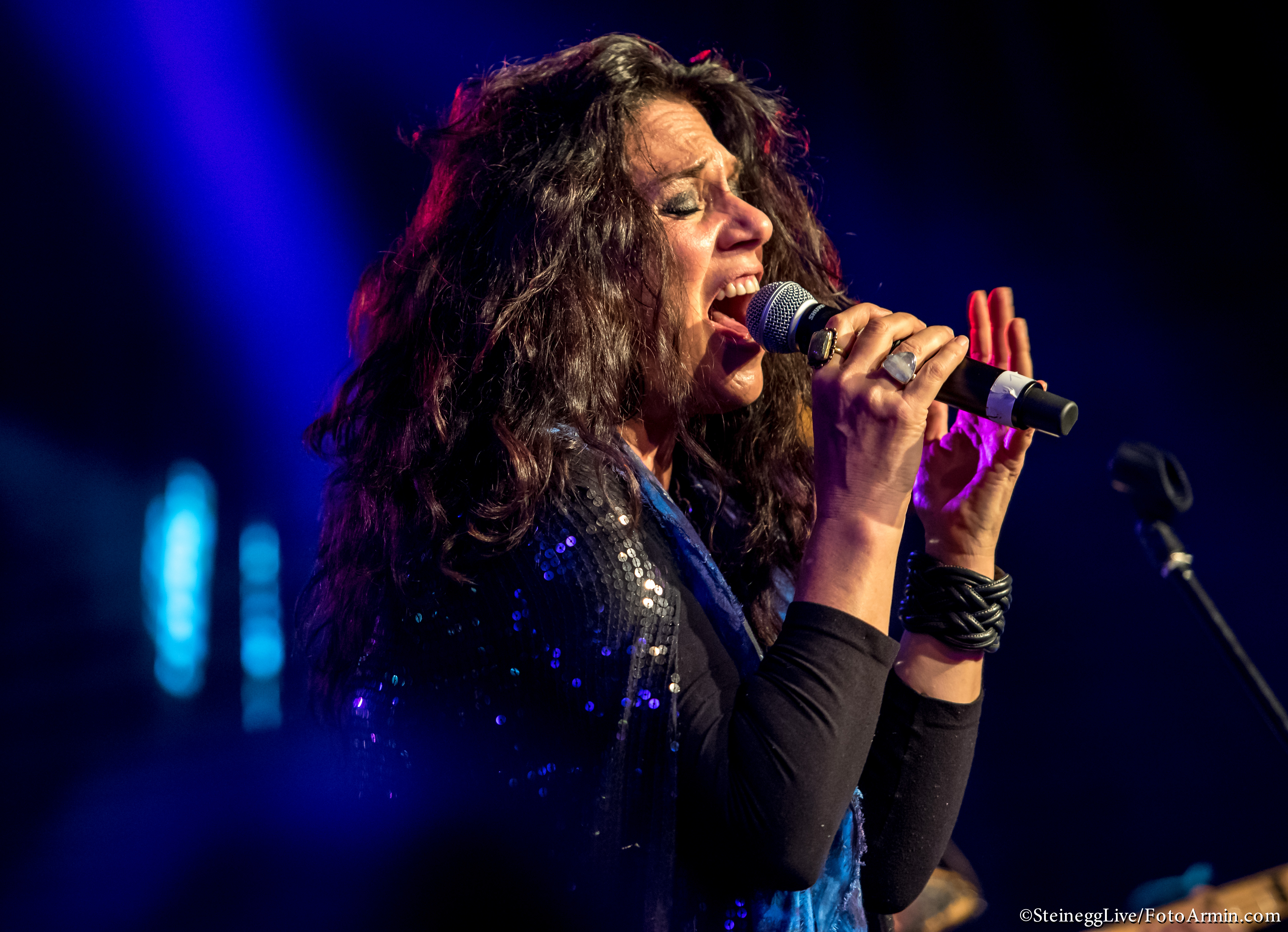

Background information
- Born: Sari Beth Schorr; New York, New York, United States
- Genres: Blues rock
- Occupation(s): Singer, songwriter
- Instrument: Vocals
- Years active: 2010s–present
- Labels: Manhaton Records
- Website: Official website

Sari Beth Schorr is an American blues rock singer and songwriter. She has released three albums, with the most recent being a live recording issued in 2020. Schorr has worked with Mike Vernon, Walter Trout, Innes Sibun, Joe Louis Walker, Popa Chubby, Warren Haynes, Keb Mo', Taj Mahal, Eric Burdon, Robin Trower and Carly Simon.

== Life and career ==
She was born in New York, New York, United States, to a father who was a pilot in the United States Air Force, and a mother who worked as a fashion model. Through her parents love of music, as a youngster Schorr heard recordings by Ella Fitzgerald and Billie Holiday. This in turn sparked her interest to explore other female singers, such as Bessie Smith, Ma Rainey, Mamie Smith and Etta James. Schorr had her own classic singing training, both in high school and college. She was advised to pursue a career in opera, in view of her five-octave range and strength of her singing. To begin her career, Schorr worked her way around the blues clubs and nightspots of South Bronx and the Lower East Side of Manhattan, New York. She went on to progress by touring for several years, both in the US and across Europe, by working as a backing singer with Joe Louis Walker and Popa Chubby. Schorr admitted she felt comfortable in that role stating, "Part of my problem is that I have always enjoyed slipping into someone else's band and becoming a part of their family... It was very easy for me to be in a secondary role supporting someone else's musical vision". In 2013, Schorr sang back up on Popa Chubby's album, Universal Breakdown Blues.

In January 2015, the veteran English record producer Mike Vernon, received a Keeping The Music Alive Award at the International Blues Challenge in Memphis, Tennessee. Later at the event Schorr performed a couple of numbers, and Vernon was so impressed with her that he offered to come out of retirement and produce her debut album. Through Vernon's connections, Schorr signed a recording contract with the British independent record label, Manhaton Records. Schorr later commented, "... the moment that I met Mike in Memphis it literally changed everything for me. I suddenly found myself in the company of someone who has such great vision and someone who knows just how to bring out the very best of all the artists that he works with without imprinting his own particular brand... Working with Mike gave me a lot more confidence". In September 2016, Schorr's debut album, A Force of Nature, produced by Vernon was released. Schorr wrote or co-wrote most of the songs on the album, although at Vernon's suggestion Schorr recorded her interpretation of the Supremes, "Stop! In the Name of Love". Walter Trout, who had known Schorr for a number of years, agreed to contribute his guitar work on one of the tracks, which turned out to be "Work No More", which Trout himself had written. Also included on the album was Schorr's reworking of "Black Betty". It was this song that Schorr performed at the Lead Belly Tribute Festival at Carnegie Hall in New York.

Also in 2015, Schorr was inducted into the New York Blues Hall of Fame. She also made some appearances on television including on Late Night with Conan O'Brien. To tour in promotion of her debut album, Schorr put together her backing band known as The Engine Room. This included the British guitarist Innes Sibun, Kevin Jeffries on bass, Anders Olinder on keyboards and Kevin O’Rourke playing percussion. They toured across the United States and then in Europe. Dates there included an appearance on 29 August 2017 on the International Stage at the Great British R & B Festival in Colne, Lancashire, England.

In 2018, Schorr released her sophomore album, Never Say Never. The tracks were recorded live to capture the energy of her live performances. Never Say Never was produced by Henning Gehrke and mixed by Tom Tapley. Most of the tracks were written by Schorr, although the title track was penned by Ian McLagan. In 2020, Schorr released her first live album, Live in Europe, again via Manhaton Records. The 12-track collection was recorded during her then recent touring obligations, and incorporated original songs from her two studio albums along with reworked versions of "Black Betty" and "I Just Want to Make Love to You", both audience favorites. She has collaborated with others for humanitarian causes, including on "Toast to Freedom" for Amnesty International, where she worked alongside Warren Haynes, Keb' Mo', Taj Mahal, Eric Burdon and Carly Simon. She also founded 'Matters' – a non-profit organisation. Schorr is a long distance cyclist, marathon runner and animal rights activist. She currently lives in Brooklyn, New York, with her husband and rescued pit bull triplets.

Schorr performed at The Half Moon, Putney, London, on April 13, 2022. She undertook further UK gigs in 2022, at Lytham St. Annes, Troon, and in Holmfirth plus, in April 2023, in Wolverhampton. In November 2022 she won the 'Live Act of the Year 2022' from Great Music Stories radio in the UK, which Schorr said: "It is a great honor to be recognized for your work! This is a particularly heartwarming award because most significantly, it comes from you, the fans who come out to see us! Thanks to Great Music Stories for including us among so much exceptional talent".

She is the featured vocalist on Robin Trower's album, Joyful Sky, which was released on Provogue Records in October 2023.

== Discography ==
=== Albums ===
Year	Title	Record label	Reviews
2016	A Force of Nature	Manhaton Records	
2018	Never Say Never	Manhaton Records	
2020	Live in Europe	Manhaton Records	
2023	Joyful Sky [with Robin Trower]	Provogue Records	
