= Hold Me Tight =

- Cover of the song's sheet music

Song by the Beatles

from the album With the Beatles
- Released: 22 November 1963
- Recorded: 12 September 1963
- Studio: EMI, London
- Genre: Rock and roll
- Length: 2:32
- Label: Parlophone
- Songwriter: Lennon–McCartney
- Producer: George Martin

"Hold Me Tight" is a song by the English rock band the Beatles from their 1963 album With the Beatles. It was first recorded during the Please Please Me album session, but not selected for inclusion and re-recorded for their second album.

== History ==
"Hold Me Tight" was composed principally by Paul McCartney in 1961, and was part of the Beatles' stage act until 1963. They attempted to record it for their debut Please Please Me but the 13 takes recorded were deemed unsatisfactory, and the tape was destroyed. Seven months later, they recorded a further nine takes, and the final version is an edit of the sixth and ninth takes from the second attempt, varispeeded up a semitone to F major.

Both McCartney and John Lennon, at one time or another, shared their low opinion of the song. In a 1980s interview with Mark Lewisohn, McCartney says, "I can't remember much about that one. Certain songs were just 'work' songs, you haven't got much memory of them. That's one of them." In Barry Miles' Paul McCartney: Many Years from Now, the songwriter calls it "a failed attempt at a single which then became an acceptable album filler". Lennon in 1980 said "That was Paul's ... It was a pretty poor song and I was never really interested in it."

"Hold Me Tight" has similarly been held in low regard by many music critics. In their book The Beatles: An Illustrated Record, Roy Carr and Tony Tyler call it the album's poorest track, saying it "fails because McCartney's vision of the complete tune obviously sagged somewhat". They also claim that McCartney's singing was "out of tune". Writing for Rolling Stone, Rob Sheffield describes "Hold Me Tight" as "horrifying" and says that it saves the band's cover of "Till There Was You", also released on With the Beatles, from being their "all-time ghastliest moment".

However, Ian MacDonald, in his book Revolution in the Head, says that the song's "bad press seems hardly fair," calling the construction and arrangement "equally effective" before concluding: "Play it loud with the bass boosted, and you have an overwhelming motoric rocker strongly redolent of the band's live sound."

McCartney wrote a different song called "Hold Me Tight" for a medley included on the 1973 Wings album Red Rose Speedway.

== Personnel ==
- Paul McCartney – vocal, bass, handclaps
- John Lennon – harmony vocal, rhythm guitar, handclaps
- George Harrison – backing vocal, lead guitar, handclaps
- Ringo Starr – drums, handclaps
- George Martin – producer
- Norman Smith – engineer

Personnel per MacDonald

== Cover versions ==
At least four cover versions of this song have been recorded. The Treasures, a Phil Spector-produced vocal group, recorded the song in 1963, as a single (Shirley 500) released on Spector's Philles Records. British band Stackridge included a cover version on their 1976 album, Mr. Mick. Another cover version was featured near the beginning of the 2007 Beatles-themed film, Across the Universe with vocals by Evan Rachel Wood; an American independent band, The Northern Crowns, recorded a version on their EP. Les Baronets, a Yé-yé band who was known for performing French versions of songs from the band, scored their biggest hit with a French version of this song called C'est fou mais c'est tout. The band featured René Angélil, who later became Celine Dion's manager and husband. Furthermore, Al Stewart mentions the song in the title song of his album Modern Times.
