= John Swannell (footballer) =

English footballer (1939–2024)

Personal information
- Full name: John Swannell
- Date of birth: 26 January 1939
- Place of birth: Walton-on-Thames, England
- Date of death: 17 January 2024 (aged 84)
- Position: Goalkeeper

Senior career*
Years	Team	Apps	(Gls)
- Corinthian-Casuals
1959–1960	Stockport County	1	(0)
- Corinthian-Casuals
- Hendon

International career
1964–1974	England Amateurs	61	
1967–1971	Great Britain	7	
- * Club domestic league appearances and goals

John Swannell (26 January 1939 – 17 January 2024) was an English amateur footballer, who played as a goalkeeper.

== Club career ==
Swannell played non-league football for Corinthian-Casuals and Hendon; he also made one appearance in the Football League for Stockport County during the 1959–60 season.

He played in successive Amateur Cup Finals, 1965 and 1966, with Hendon at Wembley Stadium, being a winner on the first occasion versus Whitby Town, and a loser on the second to Wealdstone. Swannell was also in goal when Hendon won the FA Amateur Cup again in 1972 beating Enfield.

== International career ==
Swannell is England's second most capped amateur international. He was also a member of the British national side which failed to qualify for both the 1968 Summer Olympics and 1972 Summer Olympics.

== Death ==
Swannell died from a heart attack on 17 January 2024, aged 84.
