= The Audience (band) =

German punk band

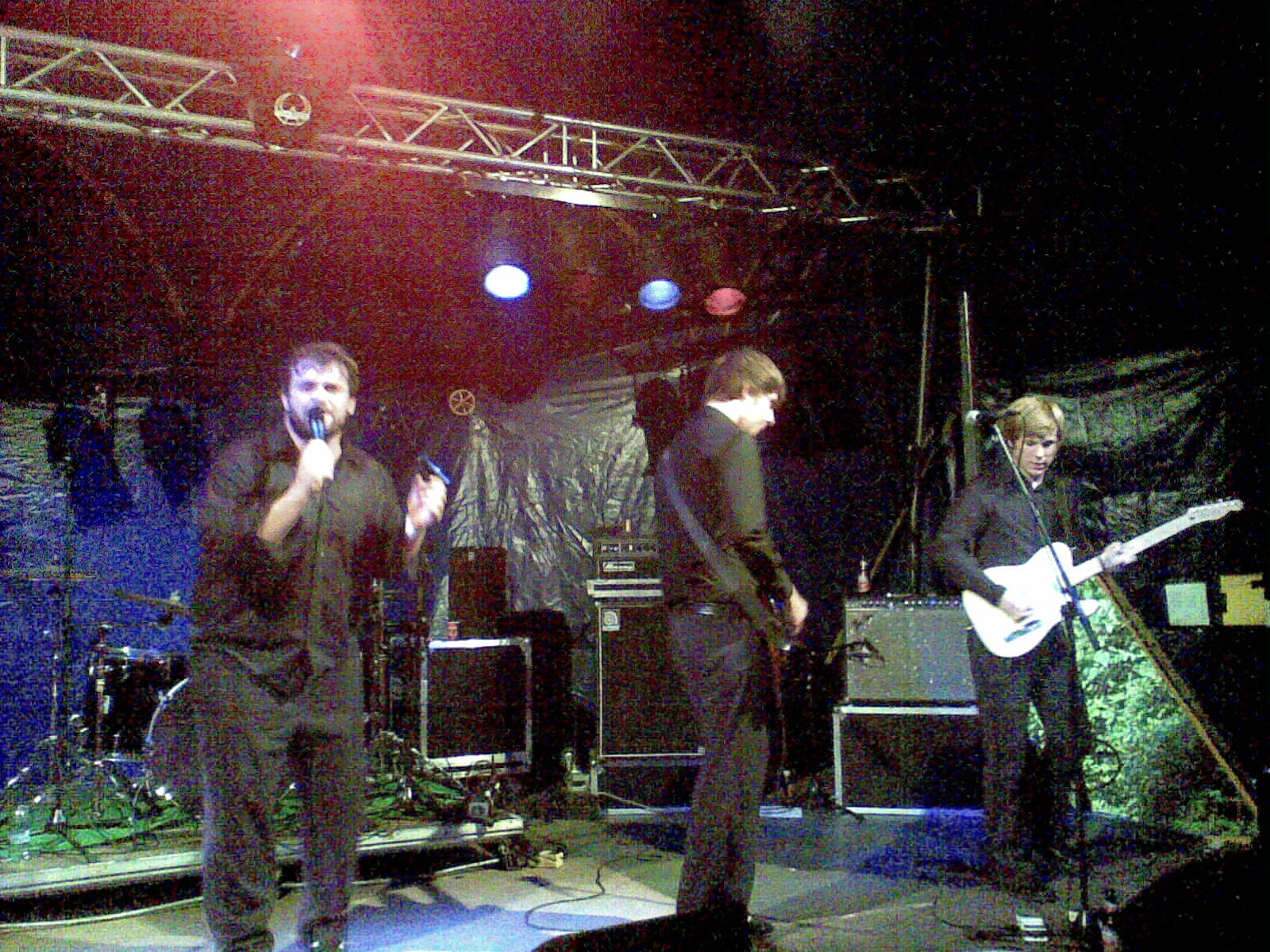
The Audience live during "de-Affaire" in Nijmegen

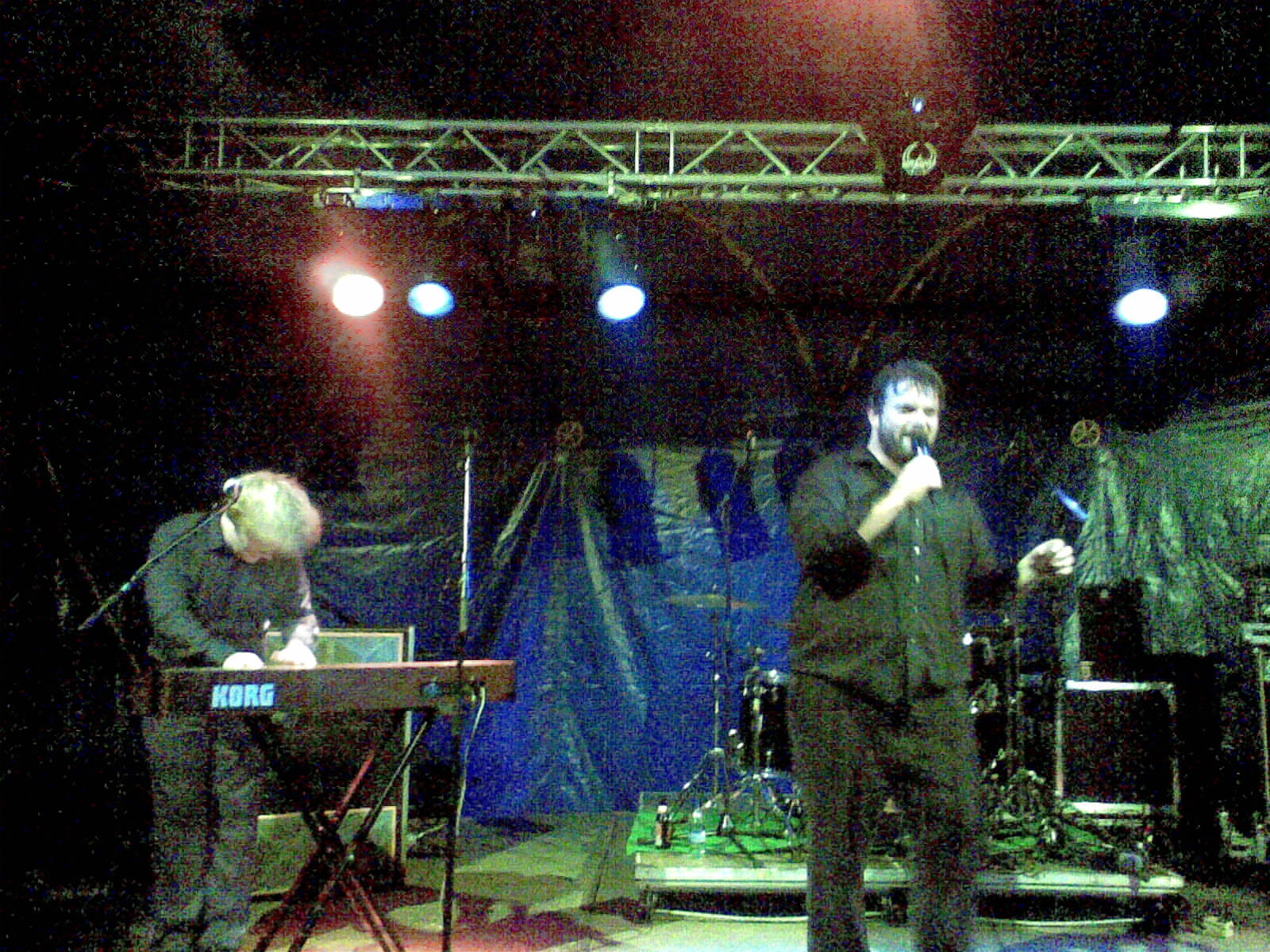
The Audience live in Nijmegen

The Audience is a young post-punk band from Nuremberg, Germany. In 2007, the band released their first album Celluloid on the German label Hazelwood. The band described its musical style as a "polymorphous potpourri of rock, punk, garage and new wave".

The lead singer is Bernd Pflaum with organist Johannes Preiss, bass player Michael Arnold, guitarist Sebastian Wild and drummer Florian Helleken.

At the Eurokeennes Festival of 2007, The Audience won the Tremplin band contest. In a review on the 3VOOR12 website, the band was praised as the "greatest revelation" of festival De Affaire as well as "absolutely promising".
