= Audience (band) =

British art rock band founded 1969

- Origin: United Kingdom
- Genres: Art rock, progressive rock
- Years active: 1969–1972; 2004–2013
- Labels: Polydor, Charisma, Elektra
- Past members: Howard Werth; Trevor Williams; Tony Connor; Simon Jeffrey; Keith Gemmell; Nick Judd; Pat Charles Neuberg; John Fisher
- Website: audienceareback.co.uk

Audience were an English art rock band formed in London in 1969 and active until 1972, with a later reunion from 2004 to 2013. The original line-up consisted of Howard Werth (vocals, electric nylon-string acoustic guitar), Keith Gemmell (saxophone, flute, clarinet), Trevor Williams (bass guitar) and Tony Connor (drums, percussion). The band recorded four studio albums and is noted for its incorporation of saxophone, flute and clarinet into progressive and art rock arrangements led by acoustic guitar rather than keyboards.

== Formation ==
Audience had their roots in a semi-professional soul band named Lloyd Alexander Real Estate, which had included all the Audience members except Connor, who had unsuccessfully auditioned for the earlier band when John Richardson left to form The Rubettes. However, Werth, Williams, and Gemmell thought of Connor when they decided to form their new band. Lloyd Alexander Real Estate issued one 45 rpm single on President PT157 in 1967: "Gonna Live Again"/"Watcha' Gonna Do (When Your Baby Leaves You)", a Mod R&B record.

Within weeks of starting rehearsals, Audience had acquired management, a publishing contract, a residency at Ronnie Scott's Jazz Club, and a recording contract with Polydor, with whom they recorded their first album, Audience. Audience was an acoustic guitar-driven album featuring Gemmell's saxophone, often electrically altered to resemble an electric lead guitar, and with string and horn arrangements by Andrew Pryce Jackman. The band were dissatisfied with the record company's promotional approach (a single, "Too Late I'm Gone" from the album had been planned and was cancelled), and temporarily moved to Switzerland to avoid involvement in proposed publicity stunts.

By the end of the year, the band were drawing public and journalistic acclaim for their songs, arrangements, and stage act. They had also been commissioned to write the score for Bronco Bullfrog, an East End teen drama film directed by Barney Platts-Mills, which established a genre subsequently taken up by Mike Leigh.

== Recordings ==
After the debut album issued on Polydor, Tony Stratton Smith, director of Charisma Records, spotted the band supporting Led Zeppelin and signed them up to his label immediately. Audience recorded three albums with Charisma. The first, Friend's Friend's Friend, was produced and designed by the band. Their subsequent releases House on the Hill and Lunch were produced by Gus Dudgeon, with arrangements by Robert Kirby and cover art by record sleeve designers Hipgnosis.

Their first two albums were not issued in the U.S. Elektra signed them up, and their final two albums were issued in the U.S.

Dudgeon's first 45 rpm production for the band, "Indian Summer", took them into the lower reaches of the U.S. charts, but by this time they were exhausted and fractious, having worked virtually non-stop for three years. A U.S. tour with Rod Stewart and The Faces and Cactus, although successful, brought things to a head, resulting in Gemmell leaving the band in January 1972.

The unfinished Lunch album was completed with the help of The Rolling Stones brass section, Jim Price and Bobby Keys, following which they went straight back on the road with new members Nick Judd on keyboards and Pat Charles Neuberg on alto and soprano saxophone.

== Break-up ==
The band never recovered from Gemmell's departure. Williams, the band's main lyricist, resigned eight months later. When Judd received an offer to join Juicy Lucy shortly thereafter, the band folded. Judd later went on to join Alan Bown, The Andy Fraser Band, Brian Eno, Frankie Miller and Sharks, most recently emerging in a Madness spin-off band.

Keith Gemmell subsequently joined Stackridge, formed Sammy, whose sole album was produced by Ian Gillan of Deep Purple, then moved on to The Roy Young Band. During this time he was also doing session work and arranging, often together with film soundtrack writer John Altman, before joining the Pasadena Roof Orchestra for fourteen years.

Howard Werth was working on his first solo album at this time, still with Charisma and produced by Dudgeon. Called King Brilliant, his band, containing members of Hookfoot and with Mike Moran on keyboards, was dubbed Howard Werth and The Moonbeams, and came close to having a chart hit with Lucinda. However, it wasn't to be, and when he was headhunted by The Doors (Audience stable-mates on the U.S. Elektra record label) to replace Jim Morrison, Werth left for the USA. The Doors did not reform, and Werth found himself engaged in various short term projects with Doors' keyboard man Ray Manzarek and musicians from Captain Beefheart and The Magic Band before returning to the UK in the early 1980s. Although appearing live only occasionally, Werth later recorded two more solo albums, 6 of 1 and Half a Dozen of the Other on Demon Records and The Evolution Myth Explodes for his own Luminous Music label.

Trevor Williams joined 1960s hitmakers The Nashville Teens, a version driven by Len Tuckey, who left shortly after to help his girlfriend Suzi Quatro launch a career with Mickie Most. Williams moved on to Jonathan Kelly's Outside, recording one single, Outside, and an album Waiting On You with a band fronted by the twin guitars of Snowy White and Chaz Jankel plus ex-Graham Bond drummer Dave Sheen and percussionist Jeff Whittaker, formerly with Peter Green and Crosby, Stills and Nash. After this, he drifted back to The Nashville Teens, this time with friend Rob Hendry – ex-Renaissance guitarist, and later with The Motors and Alan Price – in a misconceived project to revitalise the band's image and fortunes. When this foundered, Williams left the business entirely.

Tony Connor also ended up with Mickie Most. After a stint with Jackson Heights, a spin-off from The Nice, he joined one of Most's stable, Hot Chocolate in 1973, with whom he remained until it disbanded in early 2026.

== Reunions ==
Despite a few minor projects together, the original Audience band members were not to re-emerge as a working entity until 32 years after their dissolution. In 2004, Howard Werth, Keith Gemmell and Trevor Williams performed in Germany, Italy, Canada and the UK, replacing Tony Connor (who remained committed to Hot Chocolate) with drummer/vocalist John Fisher (born 8 December 1960, Buxton, Derbyshire - died 27 September 2008) and recording a live album alive&kickin'&screamin'&shoutin' for Eclectic Records. During this period, Gemmell released two solo albums, The Windhover, inspired by a poem by Gerard Manley Hopkins, and Unsafe Sax, a tribute to his early 1960s soul roots.

Following the death of John Fisher from pancreatic cancer on 27 September 2008, Audience recruited drummer Simon Jeffrey, who also worked with Bernie Torme and Blue Pulse, which Trevor Williams joined in 2009. Audience played its final gig at London's 100 Club in 2013 shortly after which Keith Gemmell, already fighting cancer, became too unwell to play. Williams subsequently announced he did not wish to continue without Gemmell but continued to work with Blue Pulse until he retired from music in 2023, having released an album entitled Trams in 2012, with Howard Werth guesting on several tracks.

Keith Gemmell died from tongue cancer on 24 July 2016.

== Personnel ==
- Howard Werth - guitars, vocals (1969–1972, 2004–2013)
- Trevor Williams - bass guitar, vocals, accordion (1969–1972, 2004–2013)
- Tony Connor - drums, piano, vocals (1969–1972)
- Keith Gemmell - saxophones, flute, clarinet (1969–1972, 2004–2013; died 2016)
- Nick Judd - keyboards (1972)
- Pat Charles Neuberg - saxophones (1972)
- John Fisher - drums, vocals (2004–2008; his death)
- Simon Jeffrey - drums, vocals (2008–2013)

== Discography ==
=== Studio albums ===
- 1969 Audience
- 1970 Friend's Friend's Friend
- 1971 The House on the Hill
- 1972 Lunch

=== Compilations ===
- You Can't Beat 'Em (Charisma), 1973) (The LP cover spine suggests this title, but it appears nowhere else)
- Unchained (Charisma/Virgin, 1992)

=== Live album ===
- Alive & Kickin' & Screamin' & Shoutin' (Eclectic Discs, 2005)

=== Singles ===
- 1970 : "Belladonna Moonshine"/"The Big Spell"
- 1971 : "Indian Summer"/"It Brings a Tear"/"Priestess" (#74 on the Billboard Hot 100)
- 1971 : "You're Not Smiling"/"Eye to Eye"
- 1972 : "Stand by the Door"/"Thunder and Lightnin'"

== Bibliography ==
- The New Musical Express Book of Rock, 1975, Star Books, ISBN 0-352-30074-4
