= Stackridge =

British rock group

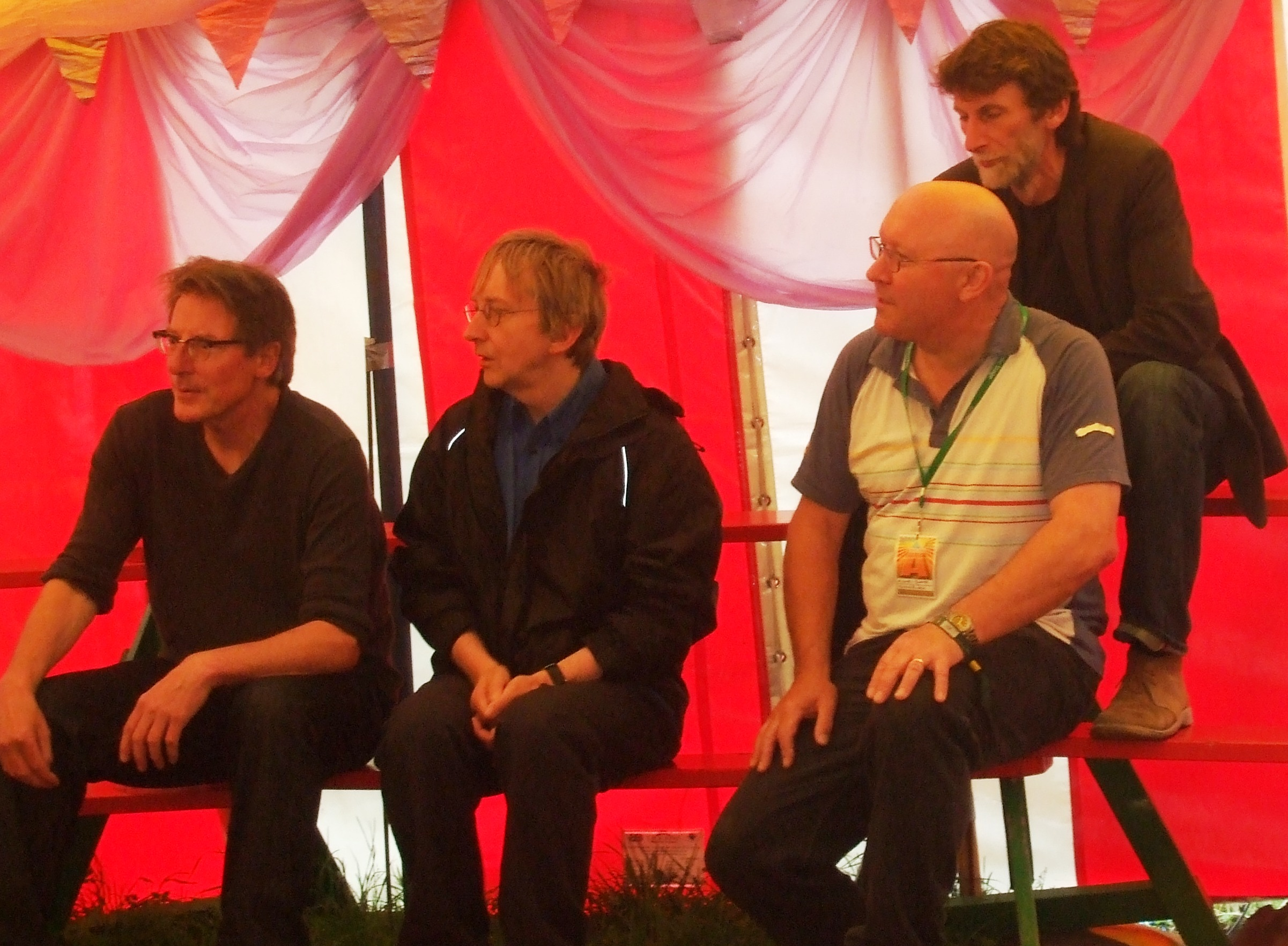
- Stackridge being interviewed at the 2008 Glastonbury Festival. From the left: Andy Davis, James Warren, Mutter Slater and Crun Walter.

Background information
- Origin: Bristol, England
- Genres: Folk rock; progressive pop; progressive rock
- Years active: 1969–1976; 1999–2015
- Labels: MCA; Rocket; Sire; Helium
- Past members: Andy Cresswell-Davis; Mike "Mutter" Slater; Mike Evans; James Warren; Billy "Sparkle" Bent; Jim "Crun" Walter; Keith Gemmell; Rod Bowkett; Paul Karas; Roy Morgan; Dave Lawson; Peter Van Hooke; Tim Robinson; Richard Stubbings; John Miller; Ian Towers
- Website: Stackridge.co.uk

Stackridge were a British musical group, formed in 1969 which had their greatest success in the early 1970s. The group claimed a very wide range of influences including the Beatles, Frank Zappa, the Marx Brothers, Bing Crosby, Tom Lehrer, Frederick Delius, and Johann Sebastian Bach. Stackrige were described by The Guardian as "prog rock and folk rock without the self-regarding pomposity of the former and the high seriousness of the latter at their worst". They have also been described as a precursor to Britpop.

== History ==
=== Classic period ===
Stackridge Lemon were formed from the remains of a previous band, Grytpype Thynne, by Andy Davis and James "Crun" Walter during 1969 in the Bristol/Bath area of South West England. After initial experimentation, the word Lemon was dropped from the band's name. The band played their first London gig at The Temple in Wardour Street on 6 February 1970. They were the opening and closing act at the first Glastonbury Festival between 19 September and 20 September 1970. During 1970, the members of the band shared a communal flat as their headquarters at 32, West Mall in Clifton, Bristol, the address of which Davis and Warren later used as the title of a song, which appeared on the debut album, Stackridge (1971).

During 1971, Stackridge began serious gigging, although Crun left to take up bricklaying. Davis, James Warren, Billy "Sparkle" Bent, Mike Evans and Mike "Mutter" Slater embarked on a UK tour supporting Wishbone Ash. Later in the year they signed to MCA Records and recorded their first album, Stackridge, at De Lane Lea Studios. They toured the UK as headliners with Renaissance supporting and played their first John Peel session for the BBC, which included a version of the Beatles' "Norwegian Wood (This Bird Has Flown)".

The group continued on a year of touring, again with Wishbone Ash and also Forever More. On 30 September they supported Lindisfarne at Newcastle City Hall. The second album, Friendliness, was quickly recorded in August 1972, and released in November with some songs that had started life in pre-Stackridge days. By this time Crun had rejoined the band, which consisted of Davis, Warren, Slater, Evans, Walter and Billy Sparkle.

In February 1973, the band made their first television appearance on BBC2's The Old Grey Whistle Test. They then toured during February and March with Camel in support. The third album, The Man in the Bowler Hat, was recorded during 1973 at AIR Studios, London, with producer George Martin. The album was released in February 1974 to excellent reviews but failed to sell in large quantities. This was the highest-charting Stackridge album in the UK Albums Chart, reaching no. 23. A different version of the album was released in the U.S. under the title Pinafore Days and became their only U.S. chart entry, peaking at number 191 on the Billboard 200.

Almost as soon as the album was finished, Sparkle left and was briefly replaced by John White. The band was then joined by Keith Gemmell from Audience, and shortly thereafter Evans, Slater, Walter, White and Warren all departed and were replaced by Rod Bowkett (keyboards), Rare Bird member Paul Karas (bass), and Roy Morgan (drums), as Davis took full control of the band. The group that went on tour to support the album sounded quite different from the one on the record.

The fourth album, Extravaganza, on Elton John's record label The Rocket Record Company, was recorded at AIR Studios with Tony Ashton producing and Rod Bowkett joining to contribute to the songwriting. The band now consisted of Davis, Bowkett, Gemmell, Karas and Morgan, along with the returning Slater, Evans, and Walter. Non-Stackridge written songs and cover versions became more prevalent. With more touring and an appearance at Wembley Stadium concert with Elton John and the Beach Boys, 1975 saw the recording of the band's fifth outing in the studio, the concept album Mr. Mick. It was based on stories and poems by Steve Augarde and was eventually recorded at Ramport Studios, Putney, with the revised line-up of Davis, Slater, Walter and Gemmell plus the addition of ex-Greenslade Dave Lawson on keyboards and Peter Van Hooke on drums.

Rocket, the group's record label, heavily edited Mr. Mick and insisted on the inclusion of a Beatles cover song, "Hold Me Tight". The album received some good press, but some shows were abandoned on the grounds that the stages were too small. Stackridge performed a final show in April 1976, and shortly afterwards the band disintegrated. MCA Records released the compilation Do the Stanley late in 1976. It contained songs from the first three albums along with singles and a previously unreleased song, "Let There Be Lids", taken from live performances.

Stackridge officially announced in 1977 that they had disbanded; James Warren and Andy Cresswell-Davis formed the Korgis a few years later and had some commercial success in the early 1980s.

=== Revival period ===
BBC Radio 1 Live In Concert, released by Windsong in July 1992, raised renewed interest in the band. John Sherry, Roy Morgan and Rod Lynton proposed a reunion tour but this never materialized. The album was re-issued by Strange Fruit in 1996.

During 1996, talks were held between original members about possible reunion and recording started. The following year, 1997 Stackridge – The Radio One Sessions was released by Strange Fruit Records.

By June 1999, the Come Back To Front UK tour was under way and June that year saw Something for the Weekend released, featuring the line-up of James Warren, Jim "Crun" Walter, Mike Evans, Richard Stubbings, John Miller, and Tim Robinson. This album featured "Something about the Beatles". Then in 2001, Pick Of The Crop and The Original Mr. Mick were released on Stackridge's own DAP Records. Mike and Jennie Evans were responsible for re-marketing the band, including setting up a website. There were infrequent live guest appearances by Mike 'Mutter' Slater. However, further turmoil within the band occurred as attempts to reunite the original band led to the Evans falling out with Warren, Walter and Slater as Davis came back to the fold; leading to Evans' departure and Slater's full-time return to the band.

2005 saw the release of the album Sex and Flags on Angel Air Records, a collection comprising many songs from Something for the Weekend, all six songs from the fan release only limited edition Lemon CD in 2002, and two Andy Davis demo recordings. The album was the first since 1973 (apart from the Lemon mini CD) to feature the core foursome of Warren, Davis, Walter and Slater. Stackridge signed up with reissue experts Angel Air in 2005. All the CDs have extensive sleeve notes, pictures of memorabilia and bonus tracks and two, Mr Mick and Forbidden City are double CD sets.

A spring 2007 tour was announced featuring this line-up, along with additional musicians. A show at The Rondo Theatre, Bath, on 1 April 2007, was filmed for a DVD, released under the title Forbidden City (also available as a CD release). The band continued to perform during 2008.

In 2008 it returned to the Glastonbury Festival to play the acoustic stage on Sunday afternoon. They also appeared at the 2008 Rhythm Festival in Bedford and at Fairport's Cropredy Convention.

An album (A Victory for Common Sense—including a rework of the Korgis's "Boots and Shoes") was released on 13 July 2009 on Helium Records.

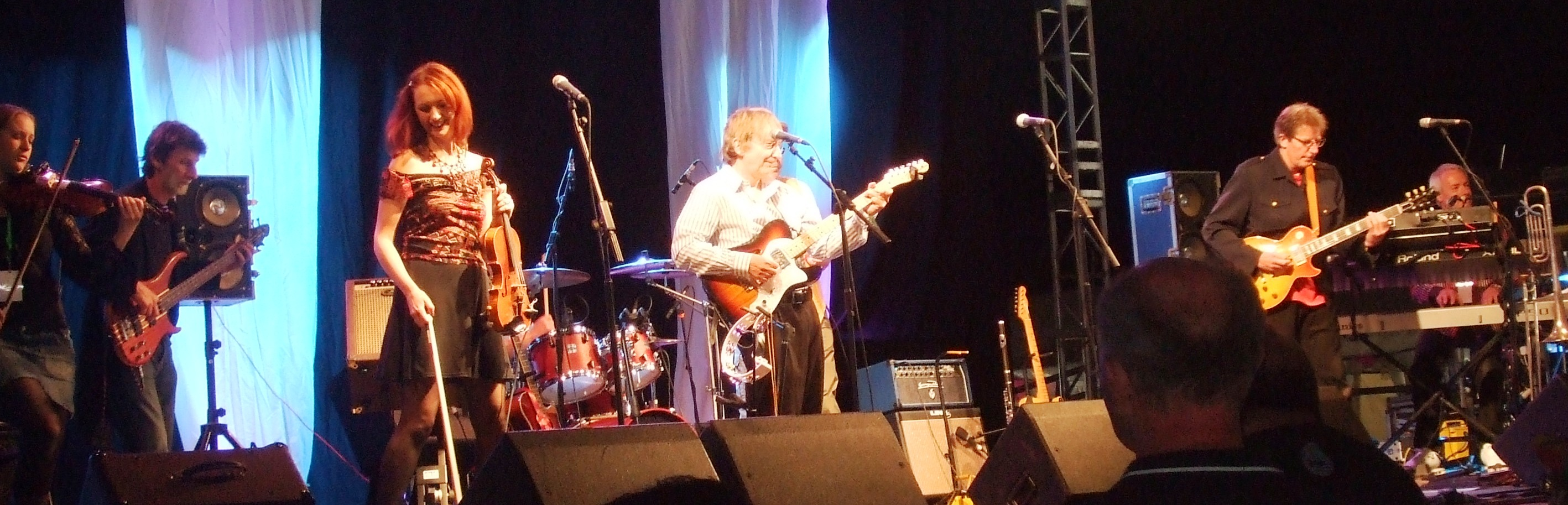
Playing the Acoustic Stage at the 2008 Glastonbury Festival.

In June 2010, it was announced that Mutter Slater had resigned from Stackridge. The stated reason was that, because of his full-time job, he could not always accept weekday bookings without taking a day out of his holiday entitlement. The announcement concluded "The rest of the band are very sorry to see him go, but will continue as a seven piece at least until the end of the year. Rehearsals will take place over the next two months to create a new direction, ready for Autumn/Winter gigs."

On 14 March 2011, the band performed live on The Late Late Show with Craig Ferguson performing "The Last Plimsoll".

In April 2014, The Scotsman columnist Euan McColm suggested that UK Labour Party leader Ed Miliband was "more Stackridge than Beatles."

In late 2014, Stackridge took a break from touring, and in early 2015 the band embarked on a UK tour as the Korgis. Around this time, the group announced that the last ever Stackridge tour would take place in autumn 2015, called "The Final Bow", at Fiddlers Club in Bristol. It commented on Twitter: "We have decided that our Autumn Tour will be our last gigs. We don't want the gigs to be sad events but a celebration of all we have done".

Former member Keith Gemmell died from throat cancer on 24 July 2016.

== Personnel ==
=== Members ===
- Andy Cresswell-Davis – lead guitars, keyboards, vocals (1969–1976, 2002–2015)
- Mike "Mutter" Slater – flute, vocals (1969–1973, 1974–1976, 2002–2010)
- Mike Evans – violin, vocals (1969–1973, 1974–1975, 1999–2002)
- James Warren – guitars, bass, vocals (1969–1973, 1999–2015)
- Billy "Sparkle" Bent – drums (1969–1973)
- Jim "Crun" Walter – bass (1969–1971, 1972–1973, 1974–1976, 1999–2012)
- Keith Gemmell – saxophone, clarinet, flute (1973–1976; died 2016)
- Rod Bowkett – keyboards (1973–1975)
- Paul Karas – bass, vocals (1973–1975)
- Roy Morgan – drums (1973–1975)
- Dave Lawson – keyboards (1975–1976)
- Peter Van Hooke – drums (1975–1976)
- Tim Robinson – drums (1999–2002)
- Richard Stubbings – flute, accordion, keyboards, guitar, penny whistle, vocals, whistling (1999–2002)
- John Miller – keyboards, vocals (1999–2000)
- Ian Towers – keyboards, vocals, guitars (2000–2002)

=== Touring musicians ===
- Ruth Evans – violin, backing vocals (1999–2000)
- Nina Smith – violin, backing vocals (1999–2000)
- Glenn Tommey – keyboards, trombone, vocals, sticks, flute, ukulele (2007–2015)
- Sarah Mitchell – violin, vocals, keyboards, whistle, tambourine (2007–2011)
- Rachel Hall – violin (2007–2009)
- Andy "Codge" Marsden – drums (2007–2008)
- Eddie John – drums, ukulele (2007, 2008–2015)
- Nigel Newton – lead guitars (2007)
- Katy Salvidge – violin (2007)
- Clare Lindley – violin, guitar, ukulele, vocals (2009–2015)

=== Lineups ===
| 1969–1971 | 1971–1972 | 1972–1973 | 1973 |
|---|---|---|---|
| Billy "Sparkle" Bent – drums; Andy Cresswell-Davis – lead guitars, keyboards, vocals; Mike Evans – violin, vocals; Mike "Mutter" Slater – flute, vocals; Jim "Crun" Walter – bass; James Warren – guitars, vocals | Billy "Sparkle" Bent – drums; Andy Cresswell-Davis – lead guitars, keyboards, vocals; Mike Evans – violin, vocals; Mike "Mutter" Slater – flute, vocals; James Warren – bass, guitars, vocals | Billy "Sparkle" Bent – drums; Andy Cresswell-Davis – lead guitars, keyboards, vocals; Mike Evans – violin, vocals; Mike "Mutter" Slater – flute, vocals; James Warren – guitars, vocals; Jim "Crun" Walter – bass | Billy "Sparkle" Bent – drums; Andy Cresswell-Davis – lead guitars, keyboards, vocals; Mike Evans – violin, vocals; Mike "Mutter" Slater – flute, vocals; James Warren – guitars, vocals; Jim "Crun" Walter – bass; Keith Gemmell – saxophone, clarinet, flute |
| 1973–1974 | 1974–1975 | 1975–1976 | 1976–1999 |
| Andy Cresswell-Davis – lead guitars, keyboards, vocals; Keith Gemmell – saxophone, clarinet, flute; Rod Bowkett – keyboards; Paul Karas – bass, vocals; Roy Morgan – drums | Andy Cresswell-Davis – lead guitars, keyboards, vocals; Keith Gemmell – saxophone, clarinet, flute; Rod Bowkett – keyboards; Paul Karas – bass, vocals; Roy Morgan – drums; Mike Evans – violin, vocals; Mike "Mutter" Slater – flute, vocals; Jim "Crun" Walter – bass | Andy Cresswell-Davis – lead guitars, keyboards, vocals; Keith Gemmell – saxophone, clarinet, flute; Mike "Mutter" Slater – flute, vocals; Jim "Crun" Walter – bass; Dave Lawson – keyboards; Peter Van Hooke – drums | Disbanded |
| 1999–2000 | 2000–2002 | 2002 | 2002–2010 |
| Mike Evans – violin, vocals; Jim "Crun" Walter – bass; James Warren – guitars, vocals; John Miller – keyboards, vocals; Tim Robinson – drums; Richard Stubbings – flute, accordion, keyboards, guitar, penny whistle, vocals, whistling | Mike Evans – violin, vocals; Jim "Crun" Walter – bass; James Warren – guitars, vocals; Tim Robinson – drums; Richard Stubbings – flute, accordion, keyboards, guitar, penny whistle, vocals, whistling; Ian Towers – keyboards, vocals, guitars | Mike Evans – violin, vocals; Jim "Crun" Walter – bass; James Warren – guitars, vocals; Tim Robinson – drums; Richard Stubbings – flute, accordion, keyboards, guitar, penny whistle, vocals, whistling; Ian Towers – keyboards, vocals, guitars; Andy Cresswell-Davis – lead guitars, keyboards, vocals | Jim "Crun" Walter – bass; James Warren – guitars, vocals; Andy Cresswell-Davis – lead guitars, keyboards, vocals; Mike "Mutter" Slater – flute, vocals |
| 2010–2012 | 2012–2015 |
| Jim "Crun" Walter – bass; James Warren – guitars, vocals; Andy Cresswell-Davis – lead guitars, keyboards, vocals | James Warren – bass, vocals; Andy Cresswell-Davis – lead guitars, keyboards, vocals |

== Discography ==
=== Singles ===
- "Spin 'Round The Room" (1974) The Rocket Record Company PIG 15-A

=== Studio albums ===
- Stackridge (1971) Angel Air SJPCD 230 (original vinyl; UK MCA and US Decca)
- Friendliness (1972) Angel Air SJPCD 231 (original vinyl; UK MCA and US MCA)
- The Man in the Bowler Hat (1974) Angel Air SJPCD 232 (original vinyl; UK MCA) (Released in 1974 in the US as Pinafore Days on Sire Records)
- Extravaganza (1975) Angel Air SJPCD 233 (original vinyl; UK Rocket and US Sire)
- Mr. Mick (1976) (original vinyl; UK Rocket - no US issue)
- Something for the Weekend (1999) Angel Air SJPCD 235
- The Original Mr. Mick (2001) Angel Air SJPCD 234
- A Victory for Common Sense (2009) (Helium B002C6K7UI)

=== Other albums ===
- Do the Stanley (1976, compilation, one previously unreleased track "Let There Be Lids") (original vinyl; UK MCA - no US issue)
- BBC Radio 1 In Concert (originally Windsong WINCD 019, 1992) (re-issued 1996) Strange Fruit SFRSCD 032
- The Radio 1 Sessions (1996) Strange Fruit SFRSCD 40
- More (4 alternative 'Something for the Weekend' mixes) (1998, fan club only CD)
- Pick of the Crop : Official Bootleg No. 1 (2000, live at Cropredy Festival, 12 August 2000) Dap 104CD
- CD-Romp: The Official Stackridge Bootleg No. 2 (2001) Dap 105CD
- Lemon 2002 (2002; fan club only; no label)
- Sex and Flags (2005, compilation of most of Something for the Weekend, all of Lemon 2002 plus two Andy Davis demos) Angel Air SJPCD 205
- Purple Spaceships Over Yatton: The Best Of (2006, 19 track compilation, with new recording of title track, October 2006) Angel Air SJPCD 228
- The Forbidden City (2008, live at Rondo Theatre, Bath, 1 April 2007) Angel Air SJPCD 251
- Anyone For Tennis (CD and DVD set, combining Purple Spaceships Over Yatton: Best of CD and Forbidden City DVD with new photos and new, extensive sleevenotes, September 2008) Angel Air SJPCD 271
- The Final Bow, Bristol 2015 (2019, live in Bristol)
- Lost and Found - The Reunion Years 1999-2015 (2024, 4 x CD Box Set, a combination of Something for the Weekend (1999), A Victory for Common Sense (2009) & The Final Bow, Bristol 2015 (2019, live in Bristol)

=== DVD ===
- The Forbidden City (July 2007 - live at the Rondo Theatre, Bath - 1 April 2007) Angel Air NJPDVD 630
- 4x4 (2009)
