= Do the Stanley =

Greatest hits album by Stackridge
- Released: November 1976
- Recorded: 1971–1974
- Length: 52:41
- Label: MCA Records

Stackridge compilation chronology
Do the Stanley (1976)	BBC Radio 1 Live In Concert (1991)

Do the Stanley is a compilation album of songs by the British group Stackridge. It was released in the U.K. by MCA Records after their break-up in 1976. The album contains some of the most popular tracks from their first three albums as well as songs from singles. The last song on the album "Let There Be Lids" was previously unreleased. The album is no longer available, but all of the songs have since been re-issued on other Stackridge CDs. Most of these songs are included in the 2006 collection Purple Spaceships Over Yatton: The Best of Stackridge.

== Track listing ==
1. Dora the Female Explorer (1st single)
2. Everyman (B side of 1st single)
3. Percy The Penguin (from 1st LP)
4. Slark (2nd single, different version from 1st LP)
5. Anyone For Tennis (from 2nd LP)
6. Amazingly Agnes (from 2nd LP)
7. Purple Spaceships Over Yatton (B side of 2nd single)
8. Do The Stanley (3rd single)
9. The Road To Venezuela (from 3rd LP)
10. Dangerous Bacon (from 3rd LP and later issued as a single)
11. Lummy Days (from 2nd LP)
12. The Galloping Gaucho (from 3rd LP and issued as a single)
13. C'est La Vie (B side of 3rd single)
14. Let There Be Lids (previously unreleased)

== Personnel ==
- Andy Cresswell-Davis - guitars, vocals, keyboards
- James Warren - guitars, vocals
- Michael Evans - violin, vocals
- Michael "Mutter" Slater - flute, vocals
- Jim "Crun" Walter - bass
- Billy "Sparkle" Bent - drums
