= Maiwoche =

Annual German festival

Maiwoche (May Week) is the name of an annual festival which takes place in the German city of Osnabrück, and also in Herdecke, Germany.

== Maiwoche in Osnabrück ==
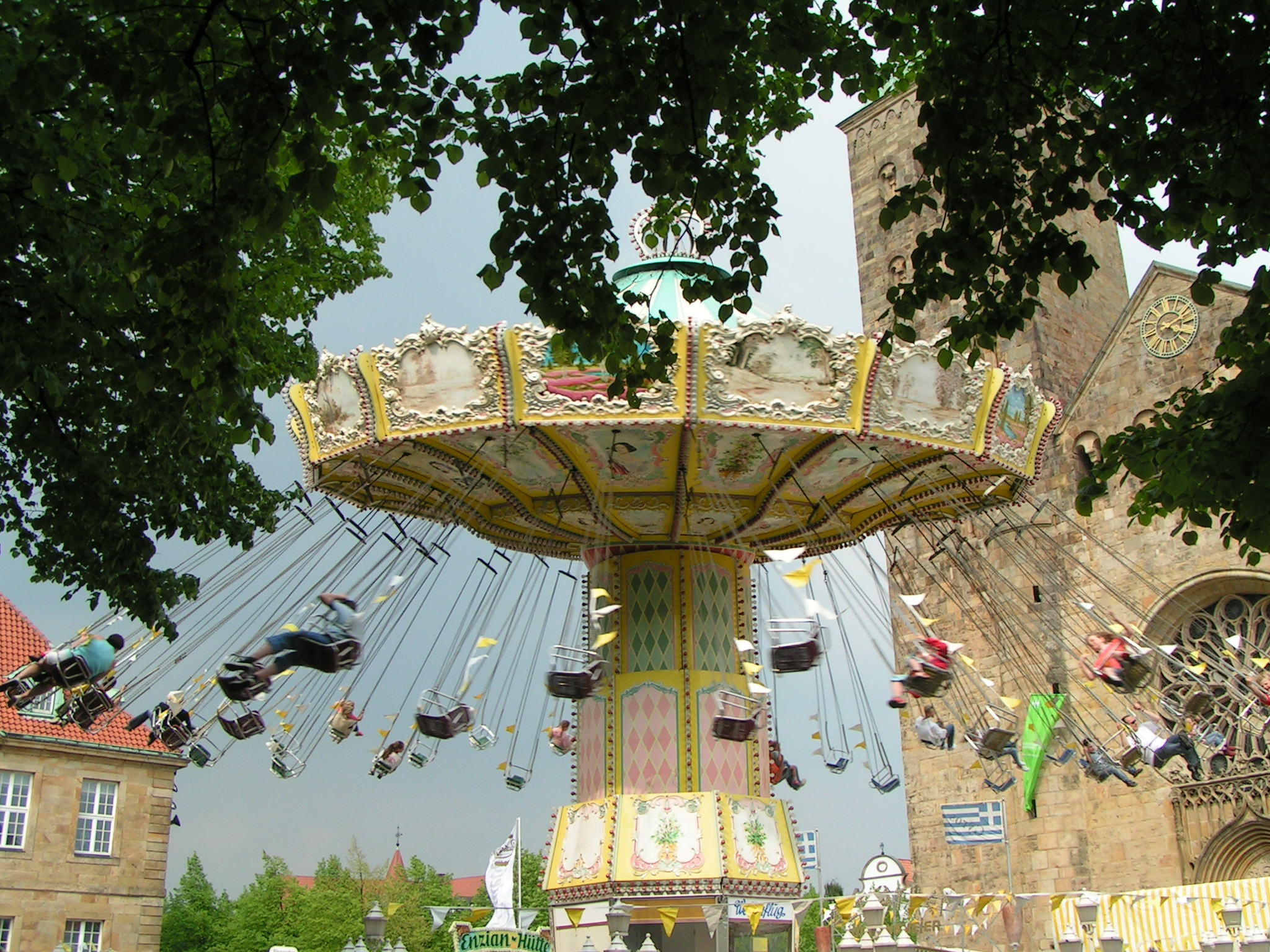
Maiwoche 2006: Swing ride in front of Osnabrück’s cathedral

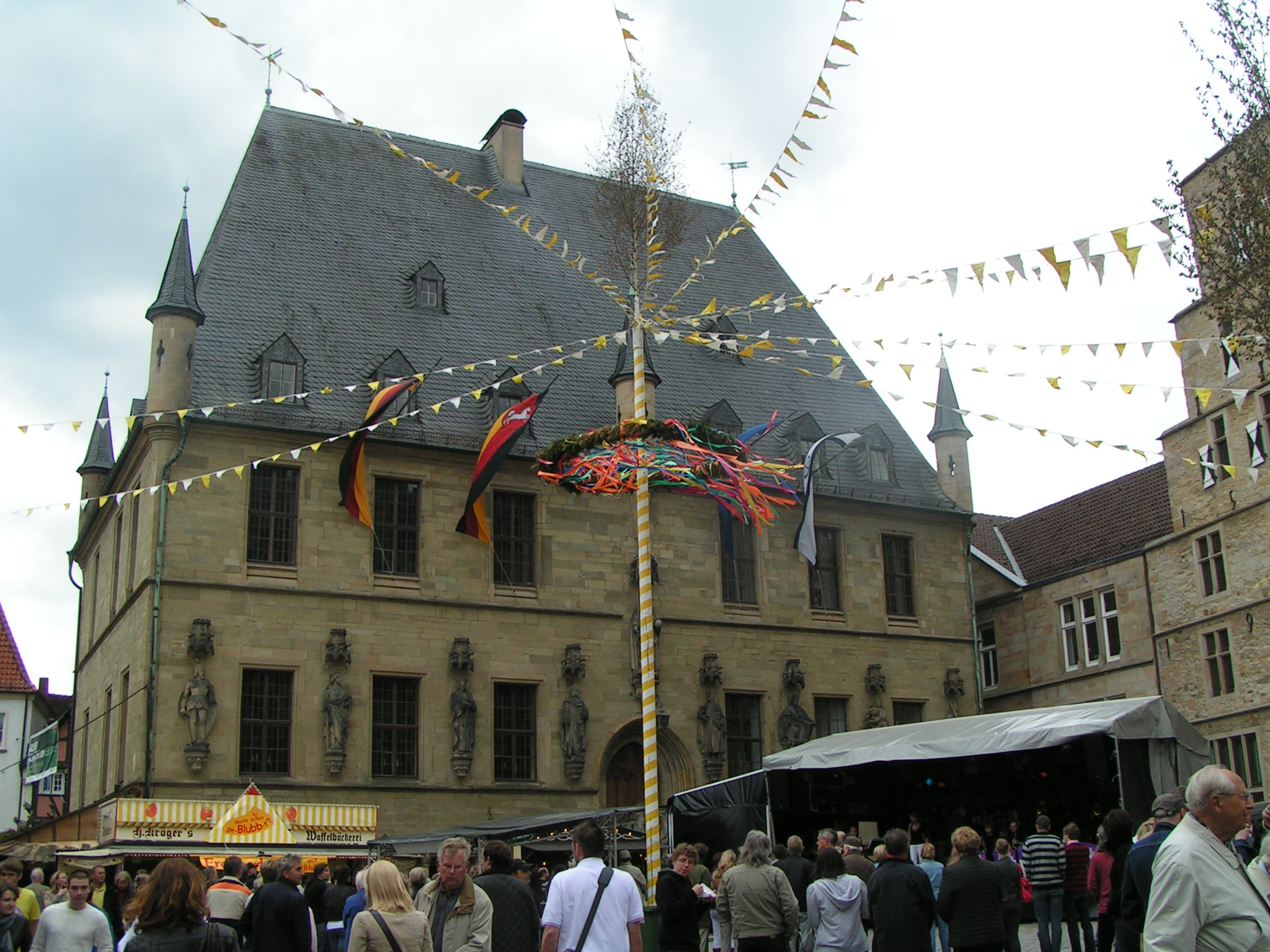
Maiwoche 2009: Stalls and concert stage on the market place outside the Town Hall

During the Maiwoche, artists and music groups of various genres perform on numerous stages spread out across the whole of Osnabrück’s city centre. These regularly include nationally and sometimes internationally renowned performers such as Die Happy, The Spencer Davis Group, Die Angefahrenen Schulkinder, Lotto Kind Karl, 4Lyn, Madsen, Mickie Krause and Casper; however, most of the groups tend to change from year to year. Stalls are also set up between the stages - similarly to funfairs – during the Maiwoche. In addition, a swing ride is set up every year in front of the cathedral in Osnabrück.

The Osnabrücker Aktien Brauerei was a co-founder of the modern Osnabrück Maiwoche. The first Maiwoche festival was opened in May 1972 with a beer barrel tapping, in the presence of then-Lord Mayor Ernst Weber. It is the largest public festival in north Germany.

More than 600,000 people attended the Maiwoche in Osnabrück in 2007 (which took place from 11 – 20 May). In 2008, it took place from 1 to 12 May (Whit Monday) and saw an estimated 700,000 people attend. The 2009 and 2010 events took place from 8 to 17 May and from 13 to 24 May respectively. In 2011, it took place from 13 to 22 May, in 2012 from 11 to 20 May, and in 2013 from 9 to 20 May. The next Maiwoche in Osnabrück will take place in 2027 from 14 to 23 May.

== Maiwoche in Herdecke ==
The Maiwoche in Herdecke is also an annual public festival. Alongside typical dishes and drinks from the Harz region, there are a number of offerings for tourists at the Maiwoche. Herdecke’s partner city Blankenburg is also involved in the festival.
