= Howard Werth =

English art rock guitarist

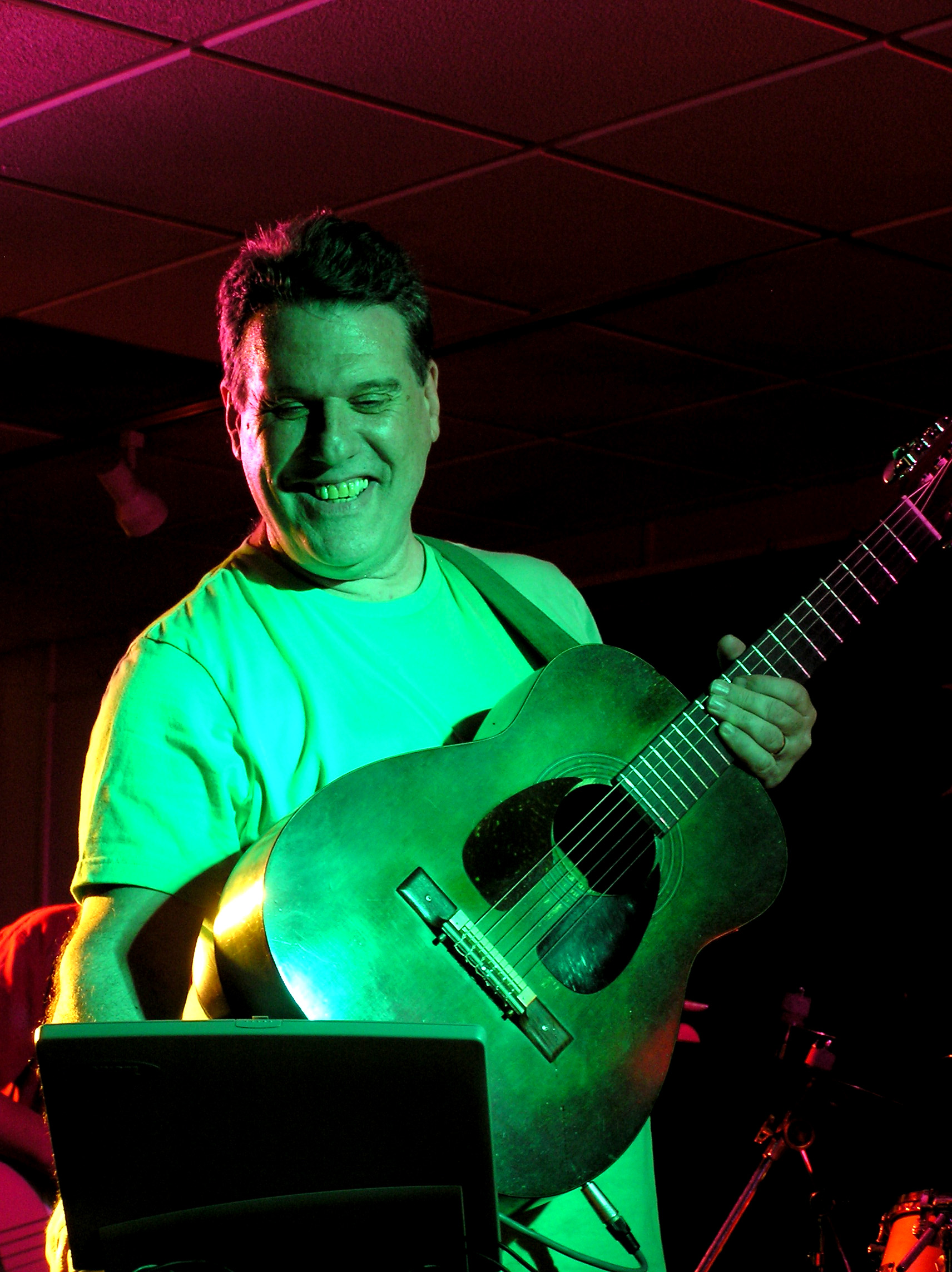

Background information
- Born: Howard Alexander Werth; 26 March 1947 (age 79)
- Origin: Clapton, London
- Genres: Blues rock, art rock
- Occupations: Musician, record producer
- Instrument: Guitar
- Years active: 1967–present
- Labels: Luminous Records, Dangerhouse
- Formerly of: Audience
- Website: www.luminousrecords.co.uk

Howard Werth (born 26 March 1947) is an English singer, guitarist and record producer. He was the founder and frontman of the cult British art rock band Audience from 1967 to 1972, and 2004 to date.

== Biography ==
Howard Werth was born at the Mother's Hospital, Clapton, East London, in 1947. His earliest rock 'n' roll influences were 1950s' stars Fats Domino, Screamin' Jay Hawkins, Little Richard, Elvis Presley, Johnny Cash, The Everlys and Buddy Holly through to The Coasters, The Drifters, and others. Later his taste expanded to the jazz influences of Charles Mingus, Thelonious Monk, Art Blakey and Miles Davis. Later still the voice of Ray Charles and the soul of James Brown.

During the 1960s, Werth went to art school at the outset of the pop-art era and was trained by some of the major British exponents of that movement. His graphic art skills led to a job designing album covers at Pye Records for The Kinks, Sandie Shaw, Marlene Dietrich and the Gerry Anderson Thunderbirds (and related) EP series, among countless other projects.

In the later part of the 1960s, Werth was gigging around London with various musicians and the notion of setting up the band Audience first came to light.

The year 1969 saw the first Audience album and sharing the stage with Led Zeppelin and Pink Floyd and touring with Rod Stewart and The Faces, Jeff Beck and others. Audience was often supported by another Charisma stablemate, Genesis. Audience recorded three further albums with Charisma. The first album, Friends Friends Friend, was produced and designed by the band members. Later producer Gus Dudgeon, arranger Robert Kirby and record sleeve designers Hipgnosis were bought in for their follow-up albums House on the Hill, their most successful album, and Lunch.

In 1972, Werth and Trevor Wiliams decided to disband Audience to pursue other projects. Werth recorded his first solo album, King Brilliant, in late 1972 as "Howard Werth and the Moonbeams", although the record is dated 1975. At the same time he was approached by The Doors to step in as a replacement for the late Jim Morrison. After a period of rehearsals in London, Ray Manzarek made the decision for The Doors not to continue without Morrison. It was an amicable split and, later on, Werth worked with Manzarek in Hollywood, some of which led to Werth's next album Six Of One and Half a Dozen of the Other. This was originally released on Howard's own METAbop! label, in conjunction with Jake Riviera, Elvis Costello’s manager and business partner, the man who started Stiff Records.

During his time in West Coast America, Werth worked extensively with Captain Beefheart’s Magic Band.

When Werth returned to the UK he created a new label, 4D Light followed by Luminous Records, for his future releases.

Although not shelving his solo projects Audience reunited in 2004. With Keith Gemmell and Trevor Williams went back on the road, gigging in Germany, Italy, Canada and the UK, replacing Tony Connor with drummer/vocalist John Fisher (born 8 December 1960, Buxton, Derbyshire) and recording a live album Alive & Kickin' & Screamin' & Shoutin’ for Eclectic Records.

After John Fisher died from pancreatic cancer on 27 September 2008, Audience recruited Letz Zep drummer Simon Jeffrey.

Audience re-emerged again when they played London's 100 Club in March 2013 which will be followed by a short UK tour later in the year but Werth, along with bassist Trevor Williams, has been performing on & off with blues rock band Blue Pulse since 2009.

In early 2012, a track recorded with Blue Pulse, "Kebab and Burger", is being considered for release as a single under the name HOWARD WERTH and Blue Pulse. Later in the year a compilation Best of ... album is being put together under the title the Grapes of Werth.
