= Angel Air Records =

English independent record label

Angel Air
- Founded: 1997
- Founder: Peter Purnell, Shirley Purnell
- Distributor: Proper Music (UK)
- Genre: Pop, rock, progressive rock, folk, world music, dance
- Country of origin: England
- Location: Stowmarket, Suffolk
- Official website: www.angelair.co.uk

Angel Air is an English independent record label established in February 1997, specialising in reissues of classic pop and rock albums originally issued in the 1960s and 1970s (and latterly new albums from known artists up to the 21st century). It was formed by Peter and Shirley Purnell.

Today the Purnells also own CeeDee Music UK which publishes over 3,000 songs, and CeeDee Management which counts Mott The Hoople members the late Overend Watts, Verden Allen and the late Dale Griffin and Saxon members Graham Oliver and Steve Dawson amongst its management clients.

Since 1997 the label has issued over 500 albums and 30 DVD titles. Its 500th release was the Stackridge live album The Final Bow two CD set.

On 18 February 2019 the Purnells sold their shares in Angel Air Records and CeeDee Music UK to father and son team Brian and Terry Adams trading as The Store For Music Ltd. The Purnell's continue to own CeeDee Management Ltd who deal with music artist business affairs and royalty collections.

== See also ==
- Lists of record labels
