= Morgan Studios =

Former recording studio in London, England

Coordinates: 51°32′50.05″N 0°14′0.42″W

Morgan Sound Studios
- Industry: Recording studio
- Founded: 1967; 59 years ago in Willesden, London, England
- Defunct: 1984; 41 years ago
- Successor: Battery Studios; The Power Plant
- Headquarters: London, England

Morgan Studios (founded as Morgan Sound Studios) was an independent recording studio in Willesden in northwest London. Founded in 1967, the studio was the location for recordings by notable artists and bands such as Sade, The Cure, Jethro Tull, the Kinks, Paul McCartney, Yes, Black Sabbath, Pink Floyd, Donovan, Joan Armatrading, Cat Stevens, Rod Stewart, UFO, and many more. Morgan sold its studios in the early 1980s, with some of its studios succeeded by Battery Studios.

== History ==
Morgan Sound Studios was founded in 1967 by Barry Morgan, Monty Babson, Jerry Allen, and Leon Calvert, who were operating a jazz record label at Lansdowne Studios and wanting dedicated office space for their label. Upon securing a location at 169–171 High Road, in the Willesden area of northwest London, the musicians decided to also build a recording studio. They hired ex-Olympic Studios engineer Terry Brown to manage the studio, who appointed another Olympic Studios alumnus, Andy Johns as chief engineer. Roy Thomas Baker, who would later achieve fame as an engineer and producer at Trident Studios, also worked at Morgan in its early years as an assistant engineer.

Studio manager Terry Brown knew that Clive Green was designing a new mixing console for Lansdowne Studios, and he asked if he could buy the design. Green instead chose to build the console himself, resulting in the founding of mixing console manufacturer Cadac Electronics. The first Cadac console - a custom, hand-wired, eight-channel split-console desk with transformerless balanced inputs and outputs - was installed at Morgan Studios. The studios initially operated with a modestly sized, 20 x 20 foot live room and a 17 x 10 ft control room with a Scully 1-inch eight-track recorder, as well as Ampex two-track and four-rack recorders. The studios also had a Steinway grand piano and a Hammond organ.

In 1969, a new, larger Studio 1 was built upstairs, with the original studio being renamed Studio 2. The new studio was outfitted with a modular, 24 x 16 Cadac mixing console, a 16-track 3M recorder, and a two-track Studer A80. The same year, four of the studios' employees, including founder Barry Morgan, keyboardist Roger Coulam, guitarist Alan Parker, and bassist Herbie Flowers, joined forces with vocalists Roger Cook and Madeline Bell to form British pop group Blue Mink.

In 1972, Morgan opened a significantly larger Studio 3 on the ground floor of a building across the street, outfitting it with a 24 x 24 Cadac console and a 3M M79 24-track recorder.

In 1974, Morgan purchased another property around the corner to open Studio 4, Morgan's largest studio space yet. Outfitted with a 28 x 24 Cadac mixing console, Studio 4 also had the distinction of being the recipient of the first Ampex 24-track tape recorder in England (although it was later replaced by a Studer A80).

Each of Morgan's control rooms had three EMT plate reverbs, two Pye limiters, and two UREI limiters. Morgan's studios also used Neumann U47 and U67 microphones.

== Successors ==
In 1980, Morgan Studios 3 and 4 were sold to the Zomba Group and became Battery Studios. In 1982, Morgan Studios 1 and 2 were sold to Robin Millar and renamed Power Plant Studios, which closed 6 years later.

== Recordings ==
=== Albums ===
==== 1960s ====
- The Doughnut in Granny's Greenhouse (1968) – Bonzo Dog Doo-Dah Band
- Disposable (1968) – The Deviants
- Tons of Sobs (1969) – Free
- Audience (1969) – Audience
- Blind Faith (1969) – Blind Faith
- Ahead Rings Out (1969) – Blodwyn Pig
- Free (1969) – Free
- Mott the Hoople (1969) - Mott the Hoople
- Led Zeppelin II (1969) – Led Zeppelin (partially)
- Ssssh (1969) – Ten Years After
- Stand Up (1969) – Jethro Tull
- Supertramp (1969–1970) – Supertramp

==== 1970s ====
- McCartney (1970) – Paul McCartney
- Lola Versus Powerman and the Moneygoround, Part One (1970) – The Kinks
- Open Road (1970) – Donovan
- Gasoline Alley (1970) – Rod Stewart
- It'll All Work Out in Boomland (1970) – T2
- Benefit (1970) – Jethro Tull
- Tea for the Tillerman (1970) – Cat Stevens
- Friend's Friend's Friend (1970) – Audience
- Long Player (portions) (1971) – Faces
- Meddle (1971) – Pink Floyd
- Every Picture Tells a Story (1971) – Rod Stewart
- St Radigunds (May/June 1971) – Spirogyra
- Muswell Hillbillies (1971) - The Kinks
- Anticipation (1971) – Carly Simon
- Can I Have My Money Back? (1971) – Gerry Rafferty
- A Tear And A Smile (1971) – Tir na nOg
- Madman Across the Water (portions) (1971) – Elton John
- America (1971) – America
- Teaser and the Firecat (1971) – Cat Stevens
- Thick as a Brick (1972) – Jethro Tull
- Waterfall (1972) – If
- The Six Wives of Henry VIII (1972) – Rick Wakeman
- Lou Reed (1972) – Lou Reed
- Catch Bull at Four (1972) – Cat Stevens
- Wringing Applause (1972) – B. A. Robertson
- Never a Dull Moment (1972) – Rod Stewart
- Lady Lake (1972) – Gnidrolog
- The Chieftains 4 (1972–1973) – The Chieftains
- Greenslade – (1972–1973) Greenslade
- There Goes Rhymin' Simon (1973 – one song) – Paul Simon
- Camel (1973) – Camel
- A Passion Play (1973) – Jethro Tull
- Tales from Topographic Oceans (1973) – Yes
- Billion Dollar Babies (1973) – Alice Cooper
- Sabbath Bloody Sabbath (1973) – Black Sabbath
- Bedside Manners Are Extra (1973) – Greenslade
- Orexis of Death (1973) – Necromandus
- Berlin (1973) – Lou Reed
- War Child (1974) – Jethro Tull
- Back to the Night (1974) – Joan Armatrading
- Jumblequeen (1974) – Bridget St John
- The Psychomodo (1974) – Cockney Rebel
- Smiler (1974) – Rod Stewart
- Spyglass Guest (1974) – Greenslade
- Now We Are Six (1974) – Steeleye Span
- Phenomenon (1974) – UFO
- The Prince of Heaven's Eyes (1974) – Fruupp
- The Myths and Legends of King Arthur and the Knights of the Round Table (1974–1975) – Rick Wakeman
- Time and Tide (1975) – Greenslade
- Sabotage (1975) – Black Sabbath
- Commoners Crown (1975) – Steeleye Span
- Force It (1975) – UFO
- Return to Fantasy (1975) – Uriah Heep
- Fish Out of Water (1975) – Chris Squire
- Dance (1975) – Arthur Brown
- Sad Wings of Destiny (1976) – Judas Priest
- No Heavy Petting (1976) – UFO
- Answer Me (1976) – Barbara Dickson
- Electric Savage (1976–1977) – Colosseum II
- Baris Mancho (1976) – Barış Manço
- She Wouldn't Understand (1976) – The Goodies
- The World Starts Tonight (1977) – Bonnie Tyler
- Songs from the Wood (1977) – Jethro Tull
- Peter Gabriel I (1977) – Peter Gabriel
- Chisholm in My Bosom (1977) – Arthur Brown
- The Quiet Zone/The Pleasure Dome (1977) – Van der Graaf Generator
- At the End of a Perfect Day (1977) – Chris de Burgh
- Crna dama/Black Lady (1977/1978) – Smak
- Squeeze (1978) – Squeeze
- Natural Force (1978) – Bonnie Tyler
- Variations (1978) – Andrew Lloyd Webber
- Back on the Streets (1978) – Gary Moore
- Three Imaginary Boys (1979) – The Cure
- Tell Me on a Sunday (1979) – Marti Webb

==== 1980s ====
- Seventeen Seconds (1980) – The Cure
- Wild Cat (1980) – Tygers of Pan Tang
- Lampefeber (1980) – C. V. Moto
- The Affectionate Punch (1980) – The Associates
- Bucks Fizz (1981) – Bucks Fizz
- Spellbound (1981) – Tygers of Pan Tang
- Renegade (1981) – Thin Lizzy
- Teddy Boys Don't Knit (1981) – Vivian Stanshall
- Faith (1981) – The Cure
- Iron Fist (1982) – Motörhead
- Pictures On A String (1982) – Comateens

=== Singles ===
- "Pinball Wizard" (1969) – The Who
- "Riki Tiki Tavi" (1970) - Donovan
- "Lola" (1970) – The Kinks
- "Woodstock" (1970) – Matthews Southern Comfort
- "Anticipation" (1971) – Carly Simon
- "Hi, Hi, Hi" (1972) – Wings
- "C Moon" (1972) – Wings
- "Step into Christmas" (1973) – Elton John
- "American Tune" (1974) – Paul Simon
- "Monkey Jive" (1975) – Tiger Lily
- "Your Generation" (1977) – Generation X
- "News of the World" (1978) – The Jam
- "Jumping Someone Else's Train" (1979) – The Cure
- "C·30 C·60 C·90 Go" (1980) – Bow Wow Wow
- "A Forest" (1980) – The Cure
- "Primary" (1981) – The Cure
- "Charlotte Sometimes" (1981) – The Cure
- "Making Your Mind Up" (1981) – Bucks Fizz

== See also ==
- List of UK recording studios
