= Die Nacht und der Wein =

Studio album by Demis Roussos
- Released: 1976
- Label: Philips
- Producer: Leo Leandros

Demis Roussos chronology
Happy to Be... (1976)	Die Nacht und der Wein (1976)	The Roussos Phenomenon (1976)

Singles from Die Nacht und der Wein
- 1. "Schön wie Mona Lisa (Wenn ich ein Maler wär')" Released: 1975; 2. "Perdoname" Released: 1975; 3. "Vagabund der Liebe" Released: 1975; 4. "Die Bouzouki, die Nacht und der Wein" Released: 1976; 5. "Komm in den Garten der tausend Melodien" Released: 1976 (German version of "Happy to Be on an Island in the Sun")

Die Nacht und der Wein is a German-language studio album by Greek singer Demis Roussos, released in 1976 on Philips Records.

== Commercial performance ==
The album reached no. 34 in Germany.

== Track listing ==
All tracks produced by Leo Leandros, except "Perdoname" produced by Demis Roussos.

Side A
No.	Title	Length
1.	"Die Bouzouki, die Nacht und der Wein"	3:40
2.	"König und Bettler"	3:37
3.	"Mein Leben ist ein Souvenir (From Souvenirs to Souvenirs)"	2:35
4.	"Komm in den Garten der tausend Melodien (Happy to Be on an Island in the Sun)"	3:15
5.	"Schön wie Mona Lisa (Wenn ich ein Maler wär')"	3:59

Side B
No.	Title	Length
1.	"Ich hab das Glück gesehn"	3:44
2.	"Vagabund der Liebe"	3:59
3.	"Wenn ich wiederkomm'"	3:50
4.	"Perdona me"	2:59
5.	"Ich bin frei"	3:00

== Charts ==
Chart (1976)	Peak position
Germany	34
