= Love and Poetry =

Studio album by Andwella's Dream
- Released: 1969
- Recorded: 1969
- Genre: Psychedelic rock
- Length: 46:30
- Label: CBS
- Producer: Rocky Shahan

Andwella's Dream chronology
| The Songs of David Lewis (1969) | Love and Poetry (1969) | World's End (1970) |

Professional ratings
Review scores
| Source | Rating |
|---|---|
| Allmusic | 3/5 stars |

Love and Poetry is the first studio album by British psychedelic band Andwella's Dream. It was released in 1969 on CBS Records.

== Background ==
Love and Poetry was composed entirely by band member Dave Lewis. It captures the true original sounds of Irish psychedelic rock. Relatively unknown, this album has achieved certain cult status after 40 years and is eagerly sought after by collectors of the genre.

It is featured in Record Collector's Top 100 British Psychedelic Records of the 1960s.

The producer was Rocky Shahan (Shahan Chowdhury) who played bass in The Konrads, a band which included David Bowie in an early line-up. He represented Pakistan in the V Festival Internacional da Canção in Rio with the song "The Best Man" in 1970.

== Track listing ==
All songs composed by Dave Lewis

1. "The Days Grew Longer for Love"
2. "Sunday"
3. "Lost a Number Found a King"
4. "Man Without a Name"
5. "Clockwork Man"
6. "Cocaine"
7. "Shades of Grey"
8. "High on a Mountain"
9. "Andwella"
10. "Midday Sun"
11. "Take My Road"
12. "Felix"
13. "Goodbye"

== Personnel ==
Andwellas Dream

- David Lewis - vocals, guitar, keyboards
- Nigel Smith - bass guitar, vocals
- Gordon Barton - drums

with:

- Bob Downes - flute, Chinese bells, tam-tam, finger cymbals, percussion, Chinese Bamboo Flute (ti-tse)

Technical

- John Hawkins - executive producer, additional arrangements
- Andrew Cameron Miller - executive producer
- Michael Cooper, Mike Fitzhenry, Philip Wade - engineer
- C. Nevil Boussmayeff - sleeve design
