= Vagabund der Liebe =

Single by Demis Roussos

from the album Die Nacht und der Wein
- Released: 1975
- Label: Philips
- Songwriter(s): Klaus Munro, Ralf Arnie, Leo Leandros
- Producer(s): Leo Leandros

Demis Roussos singles chronology
"Perdoname" (1975)	"Vagabund der Liebe" (1975)	"Happy to Be on an Island in the Sun" (1975)

"Vagabund der Liebe" is a song by Greek singer Demis Roussos. It was first released as a single in 1975 on Philips Records.

Later it was included on Roussos' 1976 German-language album Die Nacht und der Wein.

== Background and writing ==
The song was written by Klaus Munro, Ralf Arnie, and Leo Leandros. The recording was produced by Leo Leandros.

== Commercial performance ==
The song spent 10 weeks in the German chart, peaking at no. 22.

== Track listing ==
7" single Philips 6009 691 (August 1975, Germany, Austria)

A. "Vagabund der Liebe" (4:05)
B. "Ich bin frei" (3:02)

== Charts ==
Chart (1975)	Peak position
Germany	22
