= John L. Watson & The Hummelflugs =

John L Watson & The Hummelflugs
- Past members: 1962 - The Hummelflugs; John L. Watson; Graham Jeffries; Val Gwynne; Penny Kempster; Dennis Lamin; Duncan McCracken 1963 - John L Watson & The Hummelflugs; John L. Watson; Jeff Lewington; Andy Maguire; Paul Maguire; Duncan McCracken

John L Watson & The Hummelflugs were an English band, fronted by the African American singer, John L. Watson. After leaving the band, Watson went on to front John L. Watson and the Web and later The Odyssey Blues Band.

== Discography ==
- "Looking For Love" appeared on The File Series - The 60's File - Pye Records FILD 006 - (Various artists) - 1977
- "I'll Make It Worth Your While" appeared on Doin' The Mod Volume Two - Jump And Dance - Castle Music CMRCD 97 - (Various artists) - 2001

== Former personnel ==
- John L. Watson: Vocals
- Graham Jeffries: Guitar
- Val Gwynne: Bass
- Penny Kempster: Keyboards
- Dennis Lammin: Saxophone
- Jeff Lewington: Guitar
- Andy Maguire: Bass
- Paul Maguire: Keyboards and saxophone
- Duncan McCracken: Drums
