= Happy to Be on an Island in the Sun =

1975 song by Demis Roussos

Single by Demis Roussos

from the album Happy to Be...
- Released: 1975
- Label: Philips
- Songwriter: David Lewis
- Producer: Georges Petsilas

Demis Roussos singles chronology
"Vagabund der Liebe" (1975)	"Happy to Be on an Island in the Sun" (1975)	"Die Bouzouki, die Nacht und der Wein" (1976)

Music video
- "Happy to Be on an Island in the Sun" (French TV, 1971) on YouTube

"Happy to Be on an Island in the Sun" is a song by Greek singer Demis Roussos. It was released as a single in 1975.

The song was included on Roussos' 1976 album Happy to Be....

== Background and writing ==
The song was written by David Lewis. The recording was produced by Georges Petsilas.

== Commercial performance ==
The single reached no. 5 in the UK.

== Track listing ==
7" single Philips 6042 033 (1975)
7" single RTB / Philips S-53.916 (1976, Yugoslavia)

A. "Happy to Be on an Island in the Sun" (3:10)
B. "Before" (2:52)

7" single Philips 6042 091 (1975, Germany)

A. "Happy to Be on an Island in the Sun" (3:09)
B. "Sing an Ode to Love" (4:07)

== German version ==
"Komm in den Garten der tausend Melodien"

Single by Demis Roussos

from the album Die Nacht und der Wein
- Released: 1976
- Label: Philips
- Songwriters: David Lewis, Wolfgang Mürmann
- Producer: Leo Leandros

Demis Roussos singles chronology
"Can't Say How Much I Love You" (1976)	"Komm in den Garten der tausend Melodien" (1976)	"When Forever Has Gone" (1976)

Roussos recorded a German version of this song (titled "Komm in den Garten der tausend Melodien", with German lyrics by Wolfgang Mürmann) on his 1976 German-language album Die Nacht und der Wein.

The recording was produced by Leo Leandros.

The version was in 1976 also released as single.

=== Track listing ===
7" single "Komm in den Garten der tausend Melodien" Philips 6042 173 (1976, Germany)

A. "Komm in den Garten der tausend Melodien" (3:17)
B. "Ich hab das Glück gesehn" (3:46)

== Charts ==
Chart (1975)	Peak position
UK Singles (Official Charts)	5
Canada Top Singles (RPM)	83

== Certifications ==
Region	Certification	Certified units/sales
United Kingdom (BPI)	Silver	250,000^{^}
^{^} Shipments figures based on certification alone.
