= Bedside Manners Are Extra =

Studio album by Greenslade
- Released: November 1973
- Recorded: 23–31 July 1973
- Studio: Morgan, London
- Genre: Progressive rock
- Length: 38:49
- Label: Warner Bros.
- Producer: Greenslade

Greenslade chronology
Greenslade (1973)	Bedside Manners Are Extra (1973)	Spyglass Guest (1974)

Professional ratings
Review scores
Source	Rating
AllMusic	3/5 stars

Bedside Manners Are Extra is the second studio album by English progressive rock band Greenslade, released in November 1973 by Warner Bros. Records. The cover artwork was designed by artist Roger Dean, who had previously collaborated with the band on their debut album.

== Background and recording ==
The band members recalled the Bedside Manners Are Extra recordings as a very positive time for Greenslade. Their debut album had received strong reviews and solid enough sales to ensure their continued career, and the band members were getting along well both musically and personally. The Dave Greenslade-Dave Lawson songwriting partnership was flourishing, the two having settled into a routine where Greenslade would compose a chord sequence and tune and Lawson would then add on melody and lyrics.

As with their debut album, none of the songs had been played live before entering the studio, and the band instead prepared by extensively rehearsing the songs in a church hall near where Dave Greenslade lived at the time, in Middlesex. As a result of their preparation, the album was recorded in just nine days, starting on 23 July and ending on 31 July. It was a "live" style recording, with minimal overdubs and no editing together of different takes.

== Track listing ==
Side one
No.	Title	Writer(s)	Length
1.	"Bedside Manners Are Extra"	Dave Lawson, Dave Greenslade	6:16
2.	"Pilgrim's Progress"	Greenslade	7:12
3.	"Time to Dream"	Lawson, Greenslade	4:46

Side two
No.	Title	Writer(s)	Length
4.	"Drum Folk"	Greenslade, Andrew McCulloch	8:44
5.	"Sunkissed You're Not"	Lawson	6:27
6.	"Chalkhill"	Tony Reeves, Lawson	5:24

== Personnel ==
Greenslade

- Dave Greenslade – keyboards
- Dave Lawson – vocals, keyboards
- Tony Reeves – bass
- Andrew McCulloch – drums

Technical personnel

- Mike Bobak – engineer
- Trevor White – engineer
- Roger Dean – sleeve design
- Fin Costello – photography
