= Seven Secrets =

Studio album by Fruupp
- Released: 19 April 1974
- Recorded: January 1974
- Studio: Escape Studios in Egerton, Kent
- Genre: Progressive rock
- Length: 45:59
- Label: Dawn
- Producer: David Lewis

Fruupp chronology
Future Legends (1973)	Seven Secrets (1974)	The Prince of Heaven's Eyes (1974)

Professional ratings
Review scores
Source	Rating
AllMusic	3/5 stars

Seven Secrets is the second studio album by Irish progressive rock band Fruupp, released on 19 April 1974 in the United Kingdom on the Dawn Records label, a subsidiary of Pye Records for underground and progressive rock music. Like the band's debut album, it was recorded at Escape Studios in Egerton, Kent, but was this time produced by David Lewis, the frontman of another Irish rock band Andwella.

Before Fruupp entered the recording studio, they had written six songs, but felt that the album name "Seven Secrets" would be more appropriate than "Six Secrets", so Vincent McCusker composed an acoustic guitar and spoken song "The Seventh Secret" to ensure the album had seven tracks to match its new title.

== Track listing ==
Side one
No.	Title	Lyrics	Music	Length
1.	"Faced with Shekinah"	Stephen Houston	Houston	8:23
2.	"Wise as Wisdom"	Paul Charles	Vincent McCusker	7:07
3.	"White Eyes"	Charles	McCusker	7:17

Side two
No.	Title	Lyrics	Music	Length
4.	"Garden Lady"	McCusker	McCusker	9:09
5.	"Three Spires"	Charles	McCusker	5:02
6.	"Elizabeth"	Houston	Houston	7:48
7.	"The Seventh Secret"	McCusker	McCusker	1:11
Total length:				45:59

== Personnel ==
=== Fruupp ===
- Peter Farrelly – lead vocals, bass guitar; cover artwork
- Stephen Houston – keyboards, oboe, vocals
- Vincent McCusker – guitars, vocals
- Martin Foye – drums, percussion

=== Technical personnel ===
- David Lewis – producer; piano on "Three Spires"
- Tony Taverner – engineer
- Michael Rennie – conductor (strings)
- Ruby Mazur – photography, design
- Ian Stokes – photography, design
