= Dave Lawson (musician) =

English keyboardist and composer

- Born: David C. Lawson; 25 April 1945 (age 81); Alton, Hampshire, England
- Genres: Rock; progressive rock
- Occupations: Keyboardist; sound designer; composer
- Instruments: Vocals; piano; keyboards
- Years active: 1971–present
- Labels: Warner Bros.; Rocket; Mercury; Vertigo
- Website: davelawson.org

David C. Lawson (born 25 April 1945) is an English keyboardist and contemporary composer who in the 1970s was a member of UK progressive rock band Greenslade.

== Biography ==
=== Early years and Greenslade ===
Lawson was born in Alton, Hampshire, England on 25 April 1945. His father was the manager of a grocery shop in Yateley.

Lawson was educated at Lyndhurst, Charterhouse and Tonbridge School, where he received his first formal music training. He studied the music with the Royal Air Force School of Music, developing his performance skills, mostly on piano. He also studied clarinet, flute and soprano saxophone. He studied privately with the noted jazz pianist and composer Stan Tracey. After five years with the RAF, he studied piano again with Tracey.

== Greenslade ==
During the 1970s Lawson was a member of Greenslade, an English progressive rock band which formed in the autumn of 1972. They made their live debut at Frankfurt's Zoom Club in November 1972, with a line-up of Dave Greenslade (keyboards), Tony Reeves (bass guitar and double bass), Andrew McCulloch (drums and percussion) and Lawson (keyboards and vocals).

The band recorded four studio albums:

- 1973: Greenslade
- 1973: Bedside Manners Are Extra
- 1974: Spyglass Guest – UK No. 34
- 1975: Time and Tide

In the band Lawson largely shared composition with Dave Greenslade, generally writing the lyrics for Greenslade's music, but also contributing music of his own. In contrast to Dave Greenslade's preference for Hammond organ, mellotron and piano, Lawson proved to be a pioneer of analogue synthesizers.

The band announced their disbandment in early 1976, due to management problems, and Lawson then worked as a session musician before touring with Roy Harper and later Stackridge, for which band he appeared on the 1976 album Mr. Mick. In the late 1970s he played mellotron on a BBC live broadcast of David Bedford's Instructions for Angels. He was invited to join the band of Ian Gillan who had recently left Deep Purple but had to decline. He also recorded with Chris Squire and Alan White, who were taking a break from the band Yes, alongside Jimmy Page in a project titled XYZ. Lawson also played with Curved Air and in 1982, whilst recording with Bill Wyman, was invited to play with Foreigner.

=== Later years ===
Lawson played on the soundtrack of the film The Man Who Fell to Earth (1976) and later played with John Williams and the LSO for the films Star Wars (1977), Superman (1978) and The Fury (1978). In Star Wars Lawson can be heard playing the ARP 2600 to conjure the sounds of an electric tuba in the famous Tatooine cantina scene. He was a session musician for Peggy Lee, Bing Crosby and Fred Astaire. Lawson has worked as music associate, performer and programmer with such Hollywood film composers such as George Fenton, John Williams and Trevor Jones. He has also composed for a number of successful feature films and television programs.

He has become particularly noted for his work on so-called "fusion scores" such as those for the feature films Angel Heart and Mississippi Burning. He also worked on Steven Spielberg's We're Back! and on Kenneth Branagh's Mary Shelley's Frankenstein, each of which won Golden Reel Awards from the Association of Motion Picture Sound Editors.

In 1988–89, he composed the theme music for the BBC series The Paradise Club, the music for which was later issued as a soundtrack album, with contributions by Stan Tracey Big Band, Carmel and Snake Davis, amongst others.

Lawson has also composed and co-composed, with Ronnie Bond and David Dundas, music for many cinema and television advertisements including those for British Gas, Coco Pops, Philips, Le Coq, Bird's Custard, Braun, Blueband, Britannia, Philip Morris, Accurist, Atari, Dixel, Dulux, Roxy, Mintguard, Bonjour, Ellermans, Wilkinson Sword, Foster Grant, Alpine, Wash'n Dye, Arctic Lite, Yves Saint Laurent.

== Current activities ==
Lawson currently has an extensive sound design studio, with one of the largest privately owned Synclavier and synthesizer systems in Europe.

== Discography ==
=== Singles ===
- 1973: "Temple Song" / "An English Western" – Greenslade, Warner Bros.: K16264

=== Albums ===
- 1970: I Spider – Web
- 1970: Samurai – Samurai
- 1973: Greenslade – Greenslade
- 1973: Bedside Manners Are Extra – Greenslade
- 1973: Reading Festival 1973 (one track) – Greenslade, GML Records 1008
- 1974: Spyglass Guest – Greenslade – UK No. 34
- 1975: Time and Tide – Greenslade
- 1976: Mr. Mick – Stackridge
- 1978: Water Bearer - Sally Oldfield
- 1979: String of Hits - The Shadows
- 1981: Music Machine – Alan Hawkshaw / Brian Bennett / Dave Lawson
- 1981: Current Affairs – Dave Lawson / John Cameron
- 1989: The Paradise Club (six tracks) – Dave Lawson / Snake Davis and the Charmers / Carmel / Stan Tracey Big Band & others (BBC soundtrack album, REB 764)
- 1997: Shades of Green (1972–75) – Greenslade
- 1999: BBC on Air – Greenslade: Highland HL380 (promotional only)
- 2000: Live (recorded in 1973–75) – Greenslade
- 2006: Feathered Friends – Greenslade (box-set compilation)
- 2013: Live In Stockholm – March 10, 1975 – Greenslade
