= Spyglass Guest =

Studio album by Greenslade
- Released: August 1974
- Recorded: May 15 – June 6, 1974
- Studio: Morgan Studios No. 3, London
- Genre: Progressive rock
- Length: 38:40
- Label: Warner Bros. Mercury; Vertigo
- Producer: Greenslade, Jeremy Ensor

Greenslade chronology
Bedside Manners Are Extra (1973)	Spyglass Guest (1974)	Time and Tide (1975)

Professional ratings
Review scores
Source	Rating
Allmusic	(favorable)

Spyglass Guest is the third studio album by British progressive rock band Greenslade, released in 1974. It is their most commercially successful album to date, having reached number 34 in the UK Albums Chart. It was the final recording bassist Tony Reeves made with the group, leaving Greenslade shortly after the LP was completed.

== Background and recording ==
As with their first two albums, Greenslade prepared for Spyglass Guest by extensively rehearsing at a church hall in Middlesex. However, whereas half of the songs on their first albums were written collaboratively, on Spyglass Guest the band members did not give any input into each other's songs, writing them individually. Dave Greenslade said he could not say why this was, since they were all getting along well with each other.

Their recording efforts were also more individualized: Dave Greenslade did not play on any of the three Dave Lawson compositions, Tony Reeves was absent from all but one of them, and Dave Lawson in turn did not play on "Spirit of the Dance". This was in part because, due to the band being worked so hard by their management, Dave Greenslade asked Dave Lawson to write a song to be used as a solo spot for himself, in order to reduce rehearsal time. Lawson came up with several pieces, with "Red Light" being selected as his solo spot, but another, "Rainbow", was also put on the album due to a shortage of material.

While Greenslade had produced their previous album, Bedside Manners Are Extra, by themselves, they felt they needed someone in the studio to provide an outside opinion. They selected Jeremy Ensor (formerly bassist of the Principal Edwards Magic Theatre), who was their roadie at the time. Unlike their previous recording sessions, the band were doing concerts at the time, and so the album took considerably longer to record. Scheduled to start on 13 May 1974, recording actually commenced on 15 May and ended on 6 June. The sessions also broke from the "live" style of recording used for their first two albums; for example, Dave Lawson's parts on "Joie De Vivre" were recorded after all the other tracks for the song had already been laid down.

Spyglass Guest includes the only cover song Greenslade ever recorded, "Theme for an Imaginary Western", which Dave Greenslade and Tony Reeves had already performed with their previous band Colosseum both live and in the studio. The song was recorded against the objections of Dave Lawson, who felt it did not suit his playing style. Despite his objections, and despite the fact that he recorded all of the vocals for Spyglass Guest while being treated for a collapsed lung, most fans regard Lawson's vocal performance on "Theme for an Imaginary Western" to be a highlight of the track.

The album also includes one of only two Greenslade songs to employ an outside songwriter (the other is "Hallelujah Anyway" from Large Afternoon), "Joie De Vivre". After coming up with the music and title for the song, Dave Greenslade asked around for someone who could write lyrics that would suit the title and overall atmosphere, and the band's publishing company recommended Martin Hall. When Andrew McCulloch suggested the phrase "spyglass guest" from Hall's lyrics for the song be used as the album title, the rest of the band happily agreed, though Dave Greenslade admitted in a 2018 interview that he still has no idea what the phrase means.

Feeling that they had proven the concept of two keyboardists and no guitars with their first two albums, the band decided to bring in guitarists when they felt the songs called for it. Clem Clempson was Greenslade's former bandmate in Colosseum, while Andy Roberts and violinist Graham Smith both came at the recommendation of Greenslade's wife, who worked as a secretary for Tony Stratton Smith, founder of the Charisma Records label for which Roberts and Smith had both recorded.

== Cover art ==
Wanting to move away from the style of artwork exemplified by Roger Dean's covers for their first two albums, Greenslade asked Marcus Keef to create the cover for the album, with the idea of using a live black panther suggested by Dave Lawson.

== Track listing ==
1. "Spirit of the Dance" (music: Dave Greenslade) – 5:08
2. "Little Red Fry Up" (music and lyrics: Dave Lawson) – 5:11
3. "Rainbow" (music and lyrics: Dave Lawson) – 4:20
4. "Siam Seesaw" (music: Tony Reeves) – 4:43
5. "Joie De Vivre" (music: Dave Greenslade, lyrics: Martin Hall) – 8:25
6. "Red Light" (music and lyrics: Dave Lawson) – 2:27
7. "Melancholic Race" (music: Dave Greenslade) – 4:15
8. "Theme for an Imaginary Western" (music: Jack Bruce, lyrics: Pete Brown) – 3:52

== Personnel ==
Greenslade

- Dave Lawson — keyboards (except on "Spirit of the Dance"), vocals
- Dave Greenslade — keyboards (except on "Little Red Fry Up", "Rainbow", and "Red Light")
- Tony Reeves — bass guitar
- Andrew McCulloch — drums, percussion

Additional personnel

- Clem Clempson — electric guitar on "Little Red Fry Up" and "Siam Seesaw"
- Andy Roberts — acoustic guitar on "Siam Seesaw"
- Graham Smith — violin on "Joie de Vivre"
- Jeremy Ensor — recorded rain on "Rainbow", co-producer
- Greg Jackman — recorded church noises on "Joie de Vivre", engineer
- Lindsay Kidd — assistant engineer

== Charts ==
Chart (1974)	Peak position
UK Albums (OCC)	34
