= Die Bouzouki, die Nacht und der Wein =

Single by Demis Roussos

from the album Die Nacht und der Wein
- Released: 1976
- Label: Philips
- Songwriter(s): Ralf Arnie, Leo Leandros
- Producer(s): Leo Leandros

Demis Roussos singles chronology
"Happy to Be on an Island in the Sun" (1975)	"Die Bouzouki, die Nacht und der Wein" (1976)	"Can't Say How Much I Love You" (1976)

"Die Bouzouki, die Nacht und der Wein" is a song by Greek singer Demis Roussos from his 1976 German-language album Die Nacht und der Wein. It was also released as a single (in early 1976 on Philips Records).

== Background and writing ==
The song was written by Ralf Arnie and Leo Leandros. The recording was produced by Leo Leandros.

== Commercial performance ==
The song spent seven weeks in the German chart, peaking at no. 43.

== Track listing ==
7" single Philips 6042 110 (February 1976, Germany)

A. "Die Bouzouki, die Nacht und der Wein" (3:41)
B. "Wenn ich wiederkomm'" (3:51)

== Charts ==
Chart (1975)	Peak position
Germany	43
