= Greenslade (album) =

Studio album by Greenslade
- Released: February 1973
- Recorded: 11–24 November 1972
- Studios: Morgan Studios, London
- Genres: Progressive rock, rhythm and blues
- Length: 40:19
- Label: Warner Bros. (UK)
- Producers: Tony Reeves, Dave Greenslade, Stuart Taylor

Greenslade chronology
Greenslade (1973)	Bedside Manners Are Extra (1973)

Audio sample
- "Feathered Friends": file; help

Greenslade is a studio album by British progressive rock band Greenslade, released on the Warner Bros. label in 1973, and their first album. The artwork for the album cover is by Roger Dean. The album has seven tracks comprising four songs and three instrumentals.

== Background ==
The song "Feathered Friends" was issued as a promotional single, with "An English Western" and "Temple Song" on the B-side. A second single, on general release was issued in May 1973 with "Temple Song" on the A-side and "An English Western" on the B-side.

== Reception ==
Professional ratings
Review scores
Source	Rating
AllMusic	4/5 stars

Reviewing the album, planetmellotron.com said, "The album is pretty laid-back, with big themes rather than particularly strong melodies, but they made a good noise, and really didn't sound much like anyone else."

== Track listing ==
All music written by Dave Greenslade and lyrics written by Dave Lawson, except where noted.

Side one
No.	Title	Writer(s)	Length
1.	"Feathered Friends"		6:42
2.	"An English Western"	(instrumental)	3:25
3.	"Drowning Man"	lyrics: Greenslade	5:48
4.	"Temple Song"		3:32

Side two
No.	Title	Writer(s)	Length
1.	"Mélange"	music: Reeves, Greenslade, Lawson (instrumental)	7:27
2.	"What Are You Doin' to Me"	music: Lawson	4:40
3.	"Sundance"	(instrumental)	8:45

Note: The timing for "Drowning Man" is incorrectly given as 6:40 on the sleeve of the original release.

== Personnel ==
=== Greenslade ===
- Dave Lawson – keyboards, vocals
- Dave Greenslade – keyboards, co-producer
- Tony Reeves – bass guitar, double bass, co-producer
- Andrew McCulloch – drums, percussion

=== Technical ===
- Stuart Taylor – co-producer
- Mike Bobak – engineer
- Roger Dean – cover artwork

== Release history ==
Date	Format	Label	Region	Catalog
1973	LP; Cass; LP; LP; LP	Brain Records; Warner Bros. Warner Bros. Warner Bros. Philips	Germany; UK; UK; US; France	BRAIN 1027; K 446 207; K 46207; BS 2698; 6325 500
2004	CD, Reissue	Arcàngelo; Warner Music (Japan)	Japan	ARC-7077; WQCP-186
