= Happy to Be... =

Studio album by Demis Roussos
- Released: April 1976
- Studio: Studio Des Dames, Studio Davout, Air Studios
- Label: Philips Records
- Producer: Demis Roussos, Georges Petsilas

Demis Roussos chronology
Souvenirs (1975)	Happy to Be... (1976)	Die Nacht und der Wein (1976)

Singles from Happy to Be...
- 1. "Happy to Be on an Island in the Sun" Released: 1975; 2. "Can't Say How Much I Love You" Released: 1976; 3. "Far Away" Released: 1976

Happy to Be... is a studio album by Greek singer Demis Roussos, released in 1976 on Philips Records.

== Commercial performance ==
The album reached no. 4 in the UK and no. 23 in Sweden.

== Track listing ==
Side A
No.	Title	Writer(s)	Length
1.	"This Time It Isn't Au-Revoir"	Robert Rupen, Lucky Vlaviano	3:20
2.	"Mary Was an Only Child"	Albert Hammond, Michael Hazlewood, Jorge Milchberg	3:45
3.	"Fallin'"	Rupen, A. Salmawy	2:45
4.	"So Dreamy"	Rupen, Vlaviano	3:04
5.	"Funny Man"	Rupen, Michel Cywie	4:09

Side B
No.	Title	Writer(s)	Length
1.	"Can't Say How Much I Love You"	Rupen	2:30
2.	"Happy to Be on an Island in the Sun"	David Lewis	3:10
3.	"Bahia Blue"	Rupen, Salmawy	2:33
4.	"Before"	Rupen, Vlaviano	2:53
5.	"Far Away"	Rupen, Cywie	2:45
6.	"Lovely Love de Paris"	Francis Lai, Rupen	3:06

== Charts ==
=== Weekly charts ===
Chart (1976)	Peak position
Australian Albums (Kent Music Report)	57
Swedish Albums (Sverigetopplistan)	23
UK Albums (OCC)	4

=== Year-end charts ===
Chart (1976)	Position
UK Albums (OCC)	25

== Certifications ==
Region	Certification	Certified units/sales
United Kingdom (BPI)	Gold	100,000^{^}
^{^} Shipments figures based on certification alone.
