= Mouzakis =

Mouzakis is a surname. Notable people with the surname include:

- Giorgos Mouzakis (1922–2005), Greek trumpeter and composer
- Steve Mouzakis, Australian actor
