= Time and Tide (Greenslade album) =

Studio album by Greenslade
- Released: 1975
- Recorded: February 1975
- Studio: Morgan Studios, London
- Genre: Progressive rock
- Length: 31:33
- Label: Warner Bros.
- Producer: Gregg Jackman, Jeremy Ensor, Martin Briley, Dave Greenslade, Dave Lawson, Andrew McCulloch

Greenslade chronology
Spyglass Guest (1974)	Time and Tide (1975)	Live (2000)

Time and Tide is the fourth studio album of the British progressive rock band Greenslade, released in 1975 on Warner Bros. Records. The artwork for the album cover is by Patrick Woodroffe. The album was released in the US on the Mercury Records label.

An edited version of "Catalan" was released as a single, with "Animal Farm" as the B-side, but both it and the album itself failed to chart.

The track "Gangsters" was used as the theme music for the BBC TV series of the same name. Originally written for a Play for Today in 1974, Greenslade later added lyrics and it was recorded by Chris Farlowe and was used for the last series in 1978. It was included on the CD re-issue of Greenslade's solo Cactus Choir album.

== Cover art ==
Andrew McCulloch, who was at the time reading a science fiction novel with cover art by Patrick Woodroffe, suggested that he create the art for Time and Tide.

== Background and recording ==
Time and Tide saw the revival of the Dave Greenslade-Dave Lawson songwriting partnership which had been dormant during Spyglass Guest. With few exceptions, Dave Greenslade wrote the music first and Dave Lawson then added lyrics. The song "Catalan" was named in honor of a fondly remembered concert Greenslade had in the Catalonia region of Spain.

The bulk of the album was recorded in Studio Three of Morgan Studios, already famed as the place where Yes recorded Tales from Topographic Oceans, while the vocals for "Time" were recorded at Sawmills Studios. Sawmills Studios was used for this track because Dave Greenslade was an enthusiast of local choir The Treverva Male Voice Choir and wanted to record with them. Recording took place from 3 to 23 February 1975, with mixing beginning on 28 February. The album was produced by the band with engineers Gregg Jackman and Jeremy Ensor, both of whom had also worked on Spyglass Guest, though Jackman was not credited as a producer on Spyglass Guest. Dave Lawson recalled that new member Martin Briley had a strong role in the production.

== Track listing ==
All music written by Dave Greenslade and all lyrics written by Dave Lawson, except where noted.

1. "Animal Farm" (music: Lawson) – 3:22
2. "Newsworth" – 3:10
3. "Time" – 1:16
4. "Tide" – 2:44
5. "Catalan" – 5:03
6. "The Flattery Stakes" – 3:30
7. "Waltz for a Fallen Idol" – 3:18
8. "The Ass's Ears" – 3:19
9. "Doldrums" (music: Lawson) – 3:30
10. "Gangsters" – 2:21

== Personnel ==
Greenslade

- Andrew McCulloch – drums, percussion
- Dave Lawson – keyboards (except on "Time", "Tide", and "Waltz for a Fallen Idol"), lead vocals (except on "Time")
- Martin Briley – bass guitar, guitars, backing vocals
- Dave Greenslade – keyboards (except on "Animal Farm" and "Doldrums")

Additional musicians

- Barry Morgan – timbales
- The Treverva Male Voice Choir – all vocals on "Time"
- Ann Simmons and Jill MacIntosh – backing vocals on "The Flattery Stakes"

Technical personnel

- Gregg Jackman – producer, engineer
- Jeremy Ensor – producer
- Lindsay Kidd – assistant engineer

== Charts ==
Chart (2019)	Peak position
UK Independent Albums (OCC)	50
UK Rock & Metal Albums (OCC)	17
