= Schön wie Mona Lisa (Wenn ich ein Maler wär') =

Single by Demis Roussos

from the album Die Nacht und der Wein
- Released: 1975
- Label: Philips
- Songwriter(s): Klaus Munro, Ralf Arnie, Leo Leandros
- Producer(s): Leo Leandros

Demis Roussos singles chronology
"Manuela" (1974)	"Schön wie Mona Lisa (Wenn ich ein Maler wär')" (1975)	"From Souvenirs to Souvenirs" (1975)

"Schön wie Mona Lisa (Wenn ich ein Maler wär')" is a song by Greek singer Demis Roussos. It was first released as a single in 1975 on Philips Records.

Later it was included on Roussos' 1976 German-language album Die Nacht und der Wein.

== Background and writing ==
The song was written by Klaus Munro, Ralf Arnie, and Leo Leandros. The recording was produced by Leo Leandros.

== Commercial performance ==
The song reached no. 6 in Germany.

== Track listing ==
7" single Philips 6009 555 (November 1974, Germany, Austria)

A. "Schön wie Mona Lisa (Wenn ich ein Maler wär')" (3:59)
B. "Wind Wind" (3:23)

== Charts ==
Chart (1975)	Peak position
Germany	6
