= It'll All Work Out in Boomland =

Studio album by T2
- Released: 31 July 1970
- Recorded: 1970
- Studio: Morgan Studios
- Genre: Progressive rock; hard rock; proto-metal
- Length: 44:06
- Label: Decca
- Producer: Mike Dunne

T2 chronology
It'll All Work Out in Boomland (1970)	Second Bite (1992)

It'll All Work Out in Boomland is the debut album by British progressive rock band T2, and also their best known album.

== Reception ==
Professional ratings
Review scores
Source	Rating
AllMusic	4.5/5 stars

Paul Stump, in his 1997 book The Music's All that Matters: A History of Progressive Rock, said that T2 were a potential heavyweight in the progressive rock world before their career was cut short, and particularly said the track "Morning" is "a thrilling twenty-one-minute Progressive blues extravaganza". Tim Senda of Allmusic likewise called the album "a glorious one-off that has earned its status as a lost classic". He lauded the enthusiasm of the playing, especially Keith Cross's guitar work, and said that the band's earnest experimentation is tempered by the exceptionally well-crafted songs and their ability to effectively emulate contemporaries from both the baroque pop and heavy metal realms.

== Track listing ==
All tracks written by Peter Dunton.

No.	Title	Length
1.	"In Circles"	8:37
2.	"J.L.T."	5:55
3.	"No More White Horses"	8:37
4.	"Morning"	21:12
Total length:		44:06

Bonus tracks

No.	Title	Length
5.	"Questions and Answers [Live at the BBC-1970]"	5:17
6.	"CD [Live at the BBC-1970]"	7:01
7.	"In Circles [Live at the BBC-1970]"	9:07

== Musicians ==
- Keith Cross – guitars, keyboards, harmony vocals
- Bernard Jinks – bass guitar, harmony vocals
- Peter Dunton – drums, lead vocals
