= Liquin =

Liquin is a quick-drying medium for oil and alkyd paint. Used as an additive in many forms of artwork.

== Origin ==
Alkyd resin medium for artists was first invented in the 1970s by Arthur DeCosta, a longtime professor at The Pennsylvania Academy of the Fine Arts in Philadelphia. DeCosta's medium, Turco Classic, was sold only locally at the academy's school store, the Philadelphia Utrecht Linen art supply store, and one or two other privately owned art supply stores. DeCosta believed his medium had similar qualities to Maroger medium (Jacques Maroger), the fast drying, supposed medium of the Old Masters. Because Maroger medium must be cooked with lead, Turco lacked its inherent danger and had a similar, if not faster, drying time.

"The Kid," as DeCosta called the young man responsible for the manufacture of Turco, often made poor batches of the product and DeCosta, being a full-time professor as well as a prominent Philadelphia painter (notable for his portrait of former mayor Frank Rizzo), gave up on the enterprise sometime in the early 1980s. Since then many companies have produced similar products, Liquin being the most popular.

== Method ==
Winsor & Newton suggests the use of Liquin as a ''fat'' or ''flexible'' agent, to increase the flexibility subsequent layers. While Liquin Original, and Liquin Light Gel Medium are mixtures of petroleum distillates, Liquin Oleopasto, and Liquin Impasto are mixtures of alkyd resin and petroleum distillates.

== Innovation ==
Notably, it is used to speed the drying time in oil painting, though it may also be used as a barrier layer to achieve some effects. Painted over the top of etchings, India-ink drawings and other line art, it enables the application of colours by tinting with thin glazes of oil paint. This technique was first discovered by the artist Patrick Woodroffe and is outlined in his book A Closer Look (Paper Tiger, 1986, ISBN 1-85028-025-8).

Liquin also permits the creation of "save" layers in painting. (Though W&N states right on the product: "Not suitable as a varnish or final coat.")

Painted over all, or part, of an artwork in progress (and left to dry), Liquin allows the artist to scrape or wipe back subsequent work to the Liquin layer, while preserving all work beneath.

It can also be used as a simple carrier base and, when compressed together with paint under a layer of plastic wrap, produces effective decalcomania.

Liquin is not to be used as a varnish or final coat, as stated on the bottle. This is a common misconception for which multiple fine artists have used Liquin to do, Liquin is an alkyd and as such will taint the paint and becoming brittle over time if used in concentrations greater than 20% Liquin to Paint. The aforementioned techniques were pioneered as illustration techniques, where time is crucially important to meeting deadlines. Liquin is a workable medium popular to artist working in the field of illustration due to its ability to cure oils overnight in most cases. These are not widely regarded as "safe" archival practices for fine artist to employ.

Correct uses limit the amount of Liquin to paint ratios below 20%. By adding Liquin to the paint before beginning any paint mixing, then use that paint, any over saturation can be avoided, and maintain the proper ration throughout the painting session.
