= Andwella =

Irish psychedelic rock band formed in 1968

Andwella were an Irish psychedelic rock band formed in 1968, originally as The Method and later renamed Andwella's Dream. The trio were fronted by Dave Lewis (guitar/keyboard/vocals), with Nigel Smith (bass/vocals) and Gordon Barton (drums).

Their first album, as Andwella's Dream, Love and Poetry, was recorded in London in 1968, and released in August 1969. It featured jazz musician Bob Downes on saxophone and flute, and Wilgar Campbell on drums on the track "Felix". The album failed to sell, and Lewis then recorded a solo album, privately pressed, on the Ax label in 1970; which included new versions of some of the Andwella's Dream songs. In 1970 David Lewis wrote the music for and produced poet David Baxter's Goodbye Dave album, for which he was backed by Andwella.

With the addition of Dave McDougall on guitar and vocals, the band was renamed Andwella. This line-up issued World's End in August 1970, before Dave Struthers replaced Nigel Smith on bass and Jack McCulloch joined as drummer. This lineup recorded the bands' last album, People's People (released late in 1970), after which the band broke up in 1971.

Lewis later went on to write "Happy to Be on an Island in the Sun", recorded in the 1970s by Demis Roussos.

== Discography ==
as Andwella's Dream:

- "Sunday" / "Midday Sun" (45, CBS 1969)
- "Mrs Man" / "Felix" (45, CBS 1969)
- "Sunday" / "Mrs Man" (45, Columbia - Canada 1969)
- "Mr Sunshine" / "Shades Of Grey" (45, CBS)
- Love and Poetry (LP, CBS 1969-08)
- "Every Little Minute" / "Michael Fitzhenry" (45, Reflection 1970)

as Andwella:

- World's End (LP, Reflection Records 1970-08)
- "Hold On To Your Mind" / "Shadow of the Night" (45, Reflection 1970)
- "Are You Ready" / "People's People" (45, Reflection 1970)
- "Lady Love" / "Just How Long" (45, Pink Elephant - Netherlands 1970)
- People's People (LP, Reflection, rel. Late 1970)
- "I Got A Woman" / "Hold On To Your Mind" (45, Stateside - Japan 1971)
- "I Got A Woman" / "World's End (Part Two)" (45, Dunhill - US - 1971)

David Lewis solo:

- The Songs of David Lewis (1970)
- From Time to Time (1973)
- A Collection of Short Dreams (1978)

produced by David Lewis and performed by Andwella:

- David Baxter - Goodbye Dave (LP, Reflection 1970)
