= The Pentateuch of the Cosmogony =

Studio album by Dave Greenslade
- Released: 1979
- Genre: Progressive rock
- Length: 77:59
- Label: EMI
- Producer: Robin Lumley, Patrick Woodroffe

Dave Greenslade chronology
Cactus Choir (1976)	The Pentateuch of the Cosmogony (1979)	From The Discworld (1995)

The Pentateuch of the Cosmogony is a concept album and multimedia project by Patrick Woodroffe and Dave Greenslade, released in 1979. The project combines a hardback book (conceived, written and illustrated by Woodroffe) and a double vinyl album of music (written and performed by Greenslade). The title means, approximately, 'the first five books (pentateuch) of the creation (cosmogony)'. Woodroffe's artwork is heavily inspired by The Garden of Earthly Delights by Hieronymus Bosch.

The story and artwork within 'Pentateuch' are framed as a document discovered within an abandoned spacecraft in orbit around Saturn. As such, both the plot and prose follow the conventions of religious lore, even as it incorporates science fiction elements such as apocalyptic environmental disaster and interstellar travel in its second half. A combinatorial ideographic script is used throughout the artwork.

Greenslade contributed the 74 minutes of music as his second solo project. Like the story and artwork, the music is framed as the work of the alien race which built the spacecraft. To maintain this image of otherworldly origin, it was recorded almost entirely with electronic musical instruments.

A CD reissue was released in 1994, transferring Woodroffe's 12" x 12" book into a 5" square booklet. In order to keep the double album within the constraints of a single CD, the end of one track is faded out early.

The story was retold without music in Woodroffe's 1987 book The Second Earth. This featured additional artwork and was rewritten with extended prose replacing the original verse form. The additional artwork is not always as closely linked to the story as the original selection. A Japanese edition was also published.

EMI released a single in February 1980, "The Pentateuch (Overture)", which is not on the album, with shortened album tracks "Mischief" and "War" on the b-side.

== Track listing ==
All songs written by Dave Greenslade.

Side 1

1. "Introit" – 4:05
2. "Moondance" – 4:48 (faded out at 3:09 on CD version)
3. "Beltempest" – 2.:41
4. "Glass" – 3:02
5. "Three Brides" – 5:56

Side 2

6. "Birds & Bats & Dragonflies" – 3:48
7. "Nursery Hymn" – 3:32
8. "The Minstrel" – 2:42
9. "Fresco/Kashrinn" – 2:24
10. "Barcarole" – 3:51
11. "Dry Land" – 3:54

Side 3

12. "Forest Kingdom" – 3:53
13. "Vivat Regina" – 3:44
14. "Scream but Not Heard" – 2:57
15. "Mischief" – 5:36
16. "War" – 3:06

Side 4

17. "Lament for the Sea" – 3:08
18. "Miasma Generator" – 5.23
19. "Exile" – 2.33
20. "Jubilate" – 3.00
21. "The Tiger and the Dove" – 5.35

== Personnel ==
- Dave Greenslade - keyboards; vibraphone; tubular bells; vocals on 10, 11, 13, and 19; vocoder (used with all vocals on album)
- Phil Collins - percussion on 5, 10, 12, 16-18
- John Lingwood - percussion on 6, 8, 15, and 16
- Kate Greenslade (age 2 years and 6 months) - vocal on 7
