= Patrick Woodroffe =

English artist (1940–2014)

Patrick James Woodroffe (27 October 1940 – 10 May 2014) was an English artist, etcher and drawer who specialised in fantasy science-fiction artwork, with images that bordered on the surreal. His achievements include several collaborations with well-known musicians, two bronze sculptures displayed in Switzerland and numerous books.

== Chronology ==
Woodroffe was born in Halifax, West Yorkshire, in 1940, the son of an electrical engineer.

In 1964 he graduated in French and German at the University of Leeds, before going on to exhibit his first showing of pen and ink drawings, Conflict, at the Institute of Contemporary Arts in London. However he did not become a full-time artist until 1972, the year in which he gave an exhibit of his paintings, etchings and related works at the Covent Garden Gallery in London.

His career took off when he was asked to produce approximately 90 book cover paintings between 1973 and 1976 for Corgi, including Peter Valentine Timlett's The Seedbearers (1975) and Roger Zelazny's Nine Princes in Amber (1974). During this early period he was also commissioned to provide art for record album cover sleeves, including heavy metal band Judas Priest's album Sad Wings of Destiny (1976). This was followed by an exhibition of book-jacket and record-sleeve paintings in 1976, which appeared at Mel Calman's Workshop Gallery in London. That year the children's book Micky's New Home was published with illustrations by Woodroffe. In 1978 he mounted an exhibition of more than two hundred works at the historic Piece Hall in Halifax.

In 1979, Woodroffe then went on to create illustrations for The Pentateuch of the Cosmogony: The Birth and Death of a World (later shortened to 'The Pentateuch'), a joint project with the symphonic rock musician Dave Greenslade. The Pentateuch purports to be the first five chapters of an alien Book of Genesis. The album consisted of two discs by Greenslade, and a 47-page book of Woodroffe's illustrations. The record sold over 50,000 copies between 1979 and 1984. The illustrations were shown at the World Science Fiction Convention, at Brighton's Metropole Hotel in 1979. In 1976, his illustrated book The Adventures of Tinker the Hole Eating Duck was published by Dragon's World.

Album artwork and typeface by Woodroffe for The Sentinel (1983).

In 1983 he created an album sleeve for the rock band Pallas, as well as related logos for merchandise. The same year saw Woodroffe creating art (including representations of a Snark - a subject traditionally taboo for an artist to do) for composer Mike Batt's 1984 musical adaptation of Lewis Carroll's poem The Hunting of the Snark. The 1980s also saw another Patrick Woodroffe exhibition, Catching the Myth, at Folkestone's Metropole Arts Centre (1986), which featured 122 pieces selected from twenty years of work. In 1989 he prepared for conceptual art used in the film The NeverEnding Story II.

In 1987 his story The Dorbott of Vacuo – or – How to live with the Fluxus Quo: A Tale of Utterly Cosmic Insignificance was published by Paper Tiger. The many illustrations within were created especially for this story by the author.

Through the 1990s and 2000s he continued to work on numerous other projects including a sculpture at Gruyères Castle in Switzerland, based on his earlier picture The Vicious Circle (1979). The project is designed to show war as a closed circle of absurd, self-destructive futility. He continued to hold exhibitions, his latest work including a recent exhibition at Sainte Barbe, in Switzerland.

He resided with his family in Cornwall, where he had lived since 1964.

Pallas released a statement in response to the news of Woodroffe's death, saying "We have some very sad news from the family of Patrick Woodroffe: 'After a short illness, Patrick died before 3am in the early hours of Saturday morning.' Our thoughts are with his family. We are honoured to have been associated with his amazing artwork." He had succumbed to a long illness on 10 May 2014, aged 73.

== Technique ==
His work included drawings, copper etching, painting and sculpture. Woodroffe developed a variety of resourceful techniques to produce natural-media artwork over the years, including a method for colouring etchings and Indian ink drawings using oil paint. The method requires applying a barrier layer of liquin to the drawing or etching. This layer must be allowed to dry thoroughly before the oil colour is applied in thin glazes.

=== Tomographs ===
Woodroffe's work also includes tomographs (not to be confused with the medical scan—according to his book A Closer Look Woodroffe believed he had invented the word in the 1970s from the Greek words for 'cut' and 'drawing', until he found out about the medical use). Woodroffe's tomographs are photographs that combine actual objects with cut-outs of his paintings (for example in one tomograph, Woodroffe is seen 'feeding' a cut-out picture of an anthropomorphic bird with peanuts from his hand).

The picture on the front of his project The Forget-me-not-Gardener is a tomograph.

== Selected works ==
=== Musical sleeve art ===
- Strawbs, Burning for You (1977)
- Beethoven, Emperor Concerto (1974)
- Ross, RSO Records (1974)
- Greenslade, Time and Tide (1975)
- Greenslade, Greenslade 2 (1975) - preliminary artwork only, the album was never recorded.
- Budgie, Bandolier (1975) - a take on Planet of the Apes with horse riders with budgie heads
- Judas Priest, Sad Wings of Destiny (1976)
- Dave Greenslade, The Pentateuch of the Cosmogony (1979)
- Pallas, The Sentinel (1983)
- Mike Batt, The Hunting of the Snark (1984)
- Stratovarius. Fright Night (1989)
- Aragon, Don't Bring A Rain (limited edition picture CD) (1990)

The sleeves from the first copies of the following albums were replaced because of unauthorized use of Patrick Woodroffe's artwork.

- DJ Tiësto, Magik One: First Flight (1997)
- DJ Tiësto, Magik Two: Story of the Fall (1997)
- DJ Tiësto, Magik Three: Far from Earth (1998)
- DJ Tiësto, Magik Four: A New Adventure (1999)

=== Sculptures ===
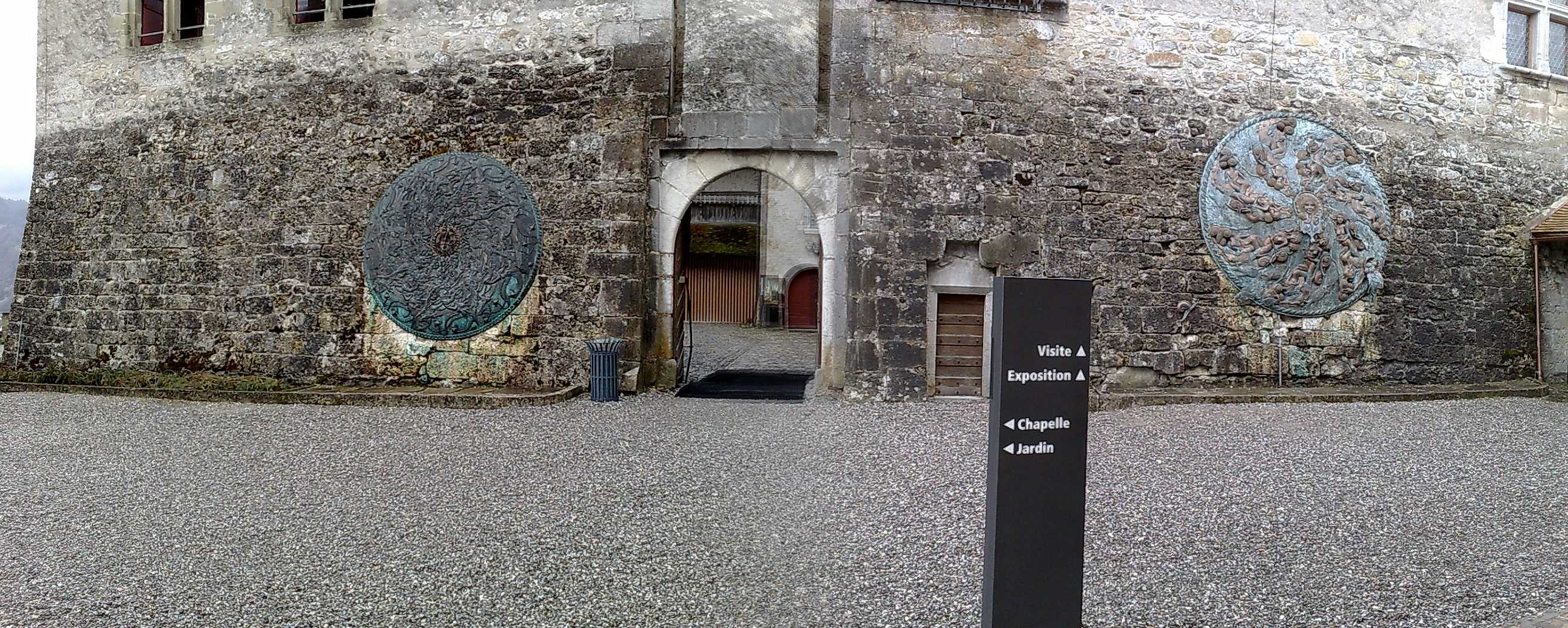
Main entrance of the Castle of Gruyères in Switzerland. Le Bouclier de Mars on the left and Le Bouclier de Vénus on the right

- Le Bouclier de Mars (1993), Gruyères Castle
- Le Bouclier de Vénus (1996), Gruyères Castle

=== Film ===
- The NeverEnding Story II: The Next Chapter conceptual art (1988–89)

=== Art projects ===
- Mythopœikon (Dragon's World, 1977), a collection of Woodroffe's work from 1965 to 1976 (the title is his own coinage, meaning myth-making images)
- The Pentateuch of the Cosmogony (1978/9), art work to accompany Dave Greenslade's album of the same name. This was originally published in an LP-sized hardcover book, with the vinyl records inside the covers.
- Pallas: The Sentinel (1983), art work for Pallas's album of the same name, merchandise, logos and follow up work
- Hunting of the Snark (1983/4), art work and models to accompany Mike Batt's musical version of Lewis Carroll's famous nonsense poem
- Hallelujah Anyway (Paper Tiger, 1984), a collection of original art (including many tomographs) and poetry.
- During the summer 1984 Woodroffe produced a series of pictures of farmyard life and farm animals.
- The Forget-Me-Not-Gardener (2005), a recent collection of art

=== Books ===
As well as providing cover-art for numerous authors, Woodroffe has also produced books on his art techniques (such as A Closer Look at the art and techniques of Patrick Woodroffe, 1986) and Mythopoeikon, published by Paper Tiger Books (1976)(ISBN 978-0905895222).
