= Dave Lewis (Northern Irish musician) =

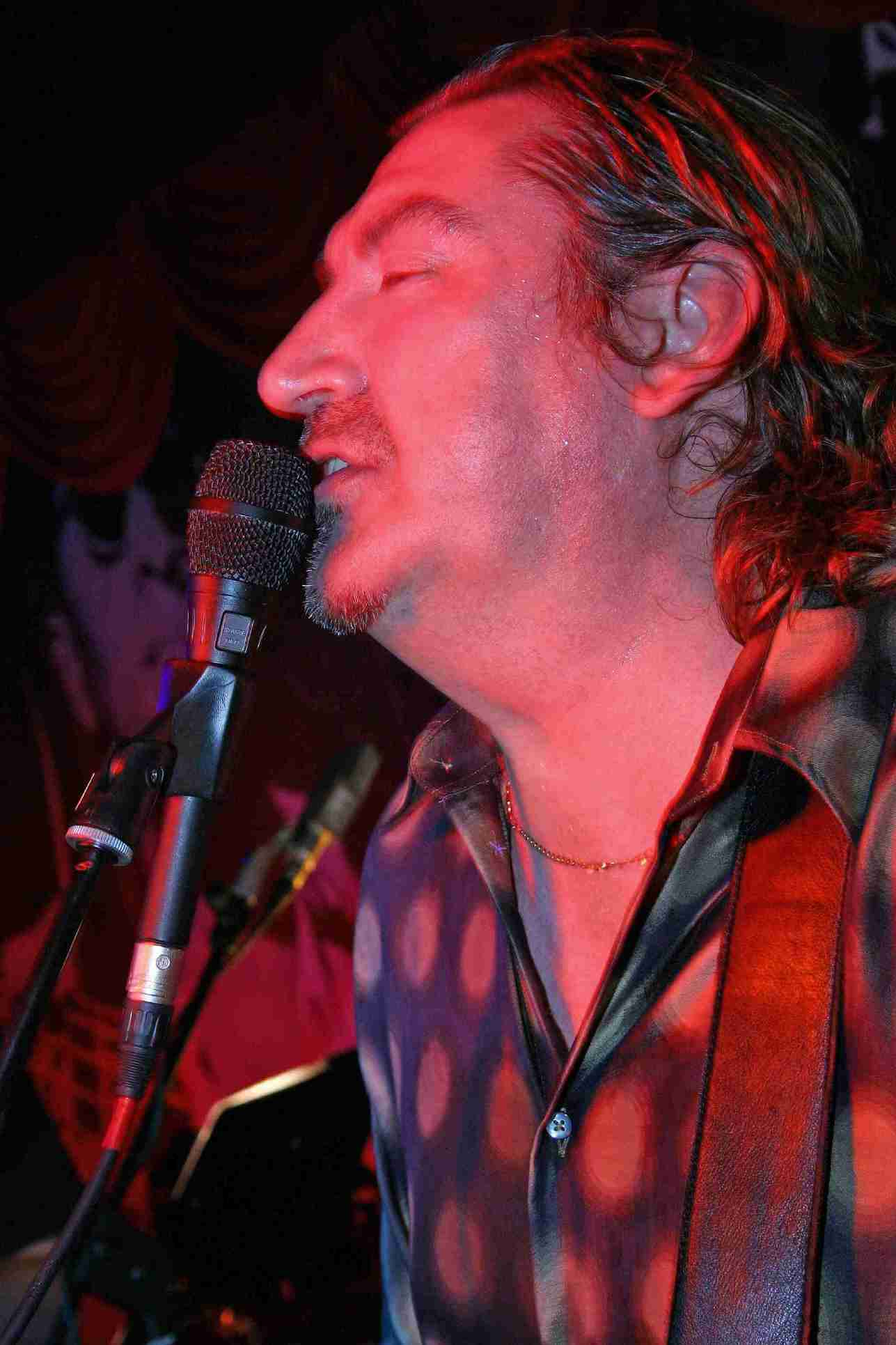
- Lewis performing live in Belfast in 2009

Background information
- Born: David Llewellyn Lewis; 18 February 1951 (age 75); Belfast, Northern Ireland
- Genres: Rock, blues, soul
- Occupations: Singer-songwriter, musician
- Years active: 1967–present
- Website: davelewismusic.com

Dave Lewis (born 18 February 1951) is a singer-songwriter and musician from Northern Ireland. He was a member of the bands Method, Andwellas Dream and Andwella.

== Personal background ==
David Llewellyn Lewis was born in Belfast, Northern Ireland. He started writing and performing songs during his childhood. By the time he was 12, his mother was getting him guest spots in Belfast social clubs and bars at a time when people such as the comedian Frank Carson were headlining. Having mastered both guitar and piano, he left school at 15 and starting working in Belfast's main music shop Crymbals, which was the epicentre of the Belfast music scene at that time.

== Professional background ==
=== Band career ===
At 16, Lewis joined his first band, the Method managed by George Mechan. Method were a five-piece soul band who were becoming popular in Dublin and fans around that time included Phil Lynott from the band Skid Row. Gary Moore (who was 16 at the time) stood in for Lewis for a few weeks while the latter was in hospital, and subsequently joined Skid Row.

The Method changed their name to Andwella's Dream after moving to London in 1968. They were signed to a new management and recording company Reflection Records, headed by Andrew Cameron Miller. In August 1969, the band released their first album Love and Poetry (CBS) with all the songs penned by Lewis before his 18th birthday. The album did not achieve wide recognition but is featured in the Record Collector's Book: 100 Greatest Psychedelic Records. After changing the name again to simply Andwella the band released two more albums; World's End (rel. 1970-08) and People's People (rel. late 1970). Lewis wrote all the songs on the Andwella albums with the exception of the "World's End Theme Part 1", which was written and arranged by Bobby Scott. During this period, Lewis also made a private pressing of 500 copies of a promotional album in 1970 entitled The Songs of David Lewis, which was never intended for general release, it was simply a vehicle to showcase his songs.

=== Solo career ===
After Andwella split up, Lewis pursued a solo career as a singer-songwriter. In May 1975, he supported Don McLean at a concert in London's Hyde Park in front of an audience of 85,000. That same year, he also toured with Fairport Convention playing to packed audiences all over the UK. During 1975, Lewis also wrote a hit song for Demis Roussos; "Happy To Be on an Island in the Sun"; the song shot to number one all over Europe and went platinum.

Also in the 1970s, Lewis released two solo albums – From Time to Time (Polydor 1976) co-produced by Chris Rainbow who also did back-up vocals, and engineered by Phil Ault, and A Collection of Short Dreams, produced by Bruce Albertine and Steve Brantley (Polydor 1978). The Dreams album was recorded at Miami's Criteria Recording and represented a musical adventure incorporating American Southern Rock and Soul into Lewis' compositional style, with his band being augmented by American musicians Steve and Jamie Brantley, Bruce Dees, and Andy McMahon. Just prior to this time Lewis had formed the Dave Lewis Band, first with the line up of Felix Krish (bass), Dave Rose (keyboards) and Preston Heyman (drums); the line-up later changed to Rob Townsend (drums), Charlie McCracken (bass) and Derek Beauchemin (keyboards).

In the 1980s, Lewis took a sabbatical from performing and touring and went travelling, on his return to London he reinvented himself as a singer-pianist after winning a competition run by the London Evening Standard, to find a resident entertainer for new West End restaurant and cocktail bar, Smollenskys Balloon. He went on to play for over 14 years at Smollensky's Balloon and Smollensky's on the Strand.

In recent years, Lewis has performed at venues all over the world including Ireland, Spain, the Caribbean and Japan, where he has a long-standing fan base dating back to his days with Andwella. In 2004, Lewis performed at two Japanese concerts hosted by Vinyl Japan at the Club 251 in Tokyo with a specially created band "Tokyo Andwella" (headed by musician Koji Wakui). The band spent weeks preparing and they performed to packed audiences. In 2005, a chance meeting with Van Morrison led to Lewis performing on Morrison's 2005 album, Magic Time. Lewis also opened a show for Morrison in Belfast at the Ulster Hall that same year.

=== "Whole Lotta Something Goin On" ===
Two of Lewis's songs, "Whole Lotta Something Goin On" (also known as "Whole Lotta Something Going On", and "Whole Lotta Something") and "Beautiful Woman", both written for his second studio album, A Collection of Short Dreams (Polydor Records, 1978), were covered by the saxophonist Raphael Ravenscroft) on his own solo album, Her Father Didn't Like me Anyway (CBS, 1979). In 2005, Ravenscroft's version of "Whole Lotta Something Goin On" was sampled by Beanie Sigel on the song "Feel It in the Air" from his album, The B. Coming peaking at number one in the US Billboard Top R&B/Hip-Hop Albums chart. The sample has gone on to become something of a rap anthem, with covers being made by a whole host of other singers and fans since it was first released by Sigel. On 30 April 2021, the song was sampled by US hip hop producer and musician DJ Khaled on the track "I Can Have it All", from his 12th studio album, Khaled Khaled and it also appeared on the track I Can Have It All on H.E.R's 2021 album Back of My Mind.

Another one of Lewis's songs to be having a revival is "Hold On To Your Mind" (from the World's End album, also released as a single (Reflection, 1970)). It was a favourite of American DJ David Mancuso at his "by invitation only" parties in the early days of The Loft (New York City). Lewis, who was unaware of the songs popularity in the 1970s New York club scene at the time, was recently interviewed by one of Mansuco's friends and collaborators, DJ Colleen 'Cosmo' Murphy on her radio show, who told him it had been a firm favourite in the early days of The Loft parties, as confirmed by an article in The New York Times in 2020 to mark the 50th anniversary of the first Loft party, 'Love Saves The Day'. Lewis continues to write songs and can often be seen performing live at the piano in the American Bar at the Savoy Hotel in London.

== Discography ==
as Andwellas Dream

- "Sunday" / "Midday Sun" (45, CBS 1969)
- "Mrs Man" / "Felix" (45, CBS 1969)
- "Sunday" / "Mrs Man" (45, Columbia – Canada 1969)
- "Mr Sunshine" / "Shades of Grey" (45, CBS)
- Love and Poetry (LP, CBS 1969)
- "Every Little Minute" / "Michael Fitzhenry" (45, Reflection 1970)

as Andwella

- World's End (LP, Reflection Records 1970)
- "Hold on To Your Mind" / "Shadow of the Night" (45, Reflection 1970)
- "Are You Ready" / "People's People" (45, Reflection 1970)
- "Lady Love" / "Just How Long" (45, Pink Elephant – Netherlands 1970)
- People's People (LP, Reflection 1970)
- "I Got A Woman" / "Hold on To Your Mind" (45, Stateside – Japan 1971)
- "I Got A Woman" / "World's End (Part Two)" (45, Dunhill – US – 1971)

Solo albums

- The Songs of David Lewis (Promotional LP 1970)
- From Time to Time (LP, Polydor 1976)
- A Collection of Short Dreams (LP, Polydor 1978)

Producing

- David Baxter – Goodbye Dave (LP, Reflection, 1970)
- Fruupp – Seven Secrets (LP, Dawn, 1974)

Songwriting

- Mississippi Water (LP, Larry McNeely by Larry McNeely Capitol, 1971)
- I've Got My Own (LP, Larry McNeely by Larry McNeely Capitol, 1971)
- Are You Ready (LP, Larry McNeely by Larry McNeely Capitol, 1971)
- "Happy to Be on an Island in the Sun" (Demis Roussos, Philips, 1975)
- "Whole Lotta Something Goin On" (LP, Her Father Didn't Like Me Anyway by Raphael Ravenscroft, Portrait, 1979)
- "Beautiful Woman" (LP, Her Father Didn't Like me Anyway by Raphael Ravenscroft, Portrait, 1979)
- "Hard Act To Follow" (Madeline Bell from her CD Soulmates, Baileo Music, 2006)
- "Whole Lotta Something Going On" (Sampled by Beanie Sigel for "Feel It in the Air", Roc-a-Fella Records, 2005) (sampled by DJ Khaled for "I Can Have it All", We the Best Music, Roc Nation and Epic Records, 2021.) Also features on an alternative version of I can Have it All by H.E.R on her album Back of My Mind (2021).
- "Behind the Painted Screen" (The Radiators From Space, Ace Records, 2012)
- Happy to Be on an Island in the Sun" Daniel O'Donnell (on the album 60 - DMG TV 2021)
- "She Taught Me To Love" used in the 2022 online advertising campaign for Gucci Eyewear.
- "Madame Butterfly Blues" written by Dave Lewis was recorded by Van Morrison on his 2026 studio album Somebody Tried to Sell Me a Bridge
