= The Prince of Heaven's Eyes =

Studio album by Fruupp
- Released: 8 November 1974
- Recorded: August – September 1974
- Studio: Morgan Studios, London
- Genre: Progressive rock
- Length: 43:03
- Label: Dawn
- Producer: Fruupp

Fruupp chronology
Seven Secrets (1974)	The Prince of Heaven's Eyes (1974)	Modern Masquerades (1975)

Singles from The Prince of Heaven's Eyes
- 1. "The Prince of Darkness" b/w "Annie Austere" Released: 11 October 1974; 2. "Prince of Heaven" b/w "The Jaunting Car" Released: 18 October 1974

Professional ratings
Review scores
Source	Rating
AllMusic	3/5 stars

The Prince of Heaven's Eyes is the third studio album by Irish progressive rock band Fruupp, released on 8 November 1974 in the United Kingdom on the Pye label's underground and progressive music imprint Dawn Records. Recorded from August to September 1974 at Morgan Studios in London, it was the only album produced by Fruupp themselves. The band supported the recording with a two-month tour which commenced on 24 October with a highly successful concert in The Ulster Hall in Belfast. In January 1975, Stephen Houston left the band to become a Christian clergyman, and was replaced by John Mason, with whom Fruupp recorded their last album to date, Modern Masquerades (1975).

The Prince of Heaven's Eyes was the group's debut LP which had been promoted by 7" singles. The first single was "The Prince of Darkness" backed with "Annie Austere", released on 11 October 1974. During the recording sessions, Fruupp composed a song called "Prince of Heaven" credited for the first and only time the whole band. It is about the album concept as opposed to being part of it, and for that reason was not included on the album and was released as the second single with "The Jaunting Car" as a B-side. It was issued as a promo on 4 October 1974 and became available at retail on 18 October. Most subsequent reissues of The Prince of Heaven's Eyes on CD featured "Prince of Heaven" as a bonus track.

== Track listing ==
Side one
No.	Title	Lyrics	Music	Length
1.	"It's All Up Now"	Stephen Houston	Houston	7:25
2.	"Prince of Darkness"	Houston	Houston	3:52
3.	"Jaunting Car"	Houston	Houston	2:27
4.	"Annie Austere"	Houston	Houston	5:20

Side two
No.	Title	Lyrics	Music	Length
5.	"Knowing You"	Vincent McCusker	McCusker	2:50
6.	"Crystal Brook"	McCusker	McCusker	8:04
7.	"Seaward Sunset"	Houston	Houston	3:09
8.	"The Perfect Wish"	Houston	Houston	9:56
Total length:				43:03

1990 Japan Teichiku Records CD edition bonus track
No.	Title	Writer(s)	Length
9.	"Prince of Heaven"	Fruupp	3:31
Total length:			46:34

2009 Esoteric Recordings remastered edition bonus track
No.	Title	Writer(s)	Length
9.	"Prince of Heaven"	Fruupp	3:34
10.	"Jaunting Car" (single version)	Houston	2:30
Total length:			48:58

== Personnel ==
=== Fruupp ===
- Peter Farrelly – lead vocals, bass guitar, flute
- Stephen Houston – keyboards, oboe, vocals
- Vincent McCusker – guitars, vocals
- Martin Foye – drums, percussion

=== Technical personnel ===
- Roger Quested – engineer
- Martin Burrow - assistant engineer/tape op
- Paul Charles – story
- Martin Cropper – art direction
- Graham Marsh – illustration
- Brian Lynch – inside photograph
