= John L. Watson (singer) =

American singer

- Born: May 19, 1941
- Died: 2014 (aged 72–73)
- Genres: Soul, R&B, pop
- Occupation: Musician
- Instrument: Vocals

John L. Watson was an American singer who fronted English rock band The Web in the 1960s. He would later record solo in the 1970s and 1980s.

== History ==
Around 1963, Watson was a member of The Hummelflugs which later became John L. Watson & The Hummelflugs. Later on he formed the progressive rock group The Web. In their earlier days they were a soul outfit. He left The Web after recording two albums with them, Fully Interlocking 1968 and Theraposa Blondi 1970. He was replaced by Dave Lawson.

He also recorded as a solo artist in the 1970s with the album White Hot Blue Black. Also backed by the group White Mouse, he recorded Let's Straighten It Out in 1975.

In the late 1990s, Watson fronted The Odyssey Blues Band. As of 2007, Watson was living in Bristol.

Watson died early in 2014.

== Discography ==
=== Singles ===
==== 7" ====
- "A Mother's Love" / "Might As Well Be Gone" – Deram 285 – 1970
- "Lonely For Your Love" /"Into My Life You Came" – EMI 2061 – 1973
- "You're The Song" / "Let's Straighten It Out" – Spark SRL 1137 – 1975 (John L Watson & White Mouse)

==== 12" ====
- "Don't Blame It on Love" / "What We Need Is Truth" – Satril ST 9153 – 1985

=== Albums ===
- White Hot Blue Black – Deram SML-R 1061 – 1970
- Let's Straighten It Out – Spark SRLP 119 – 1975
