= The Dorbott of Vacuo =

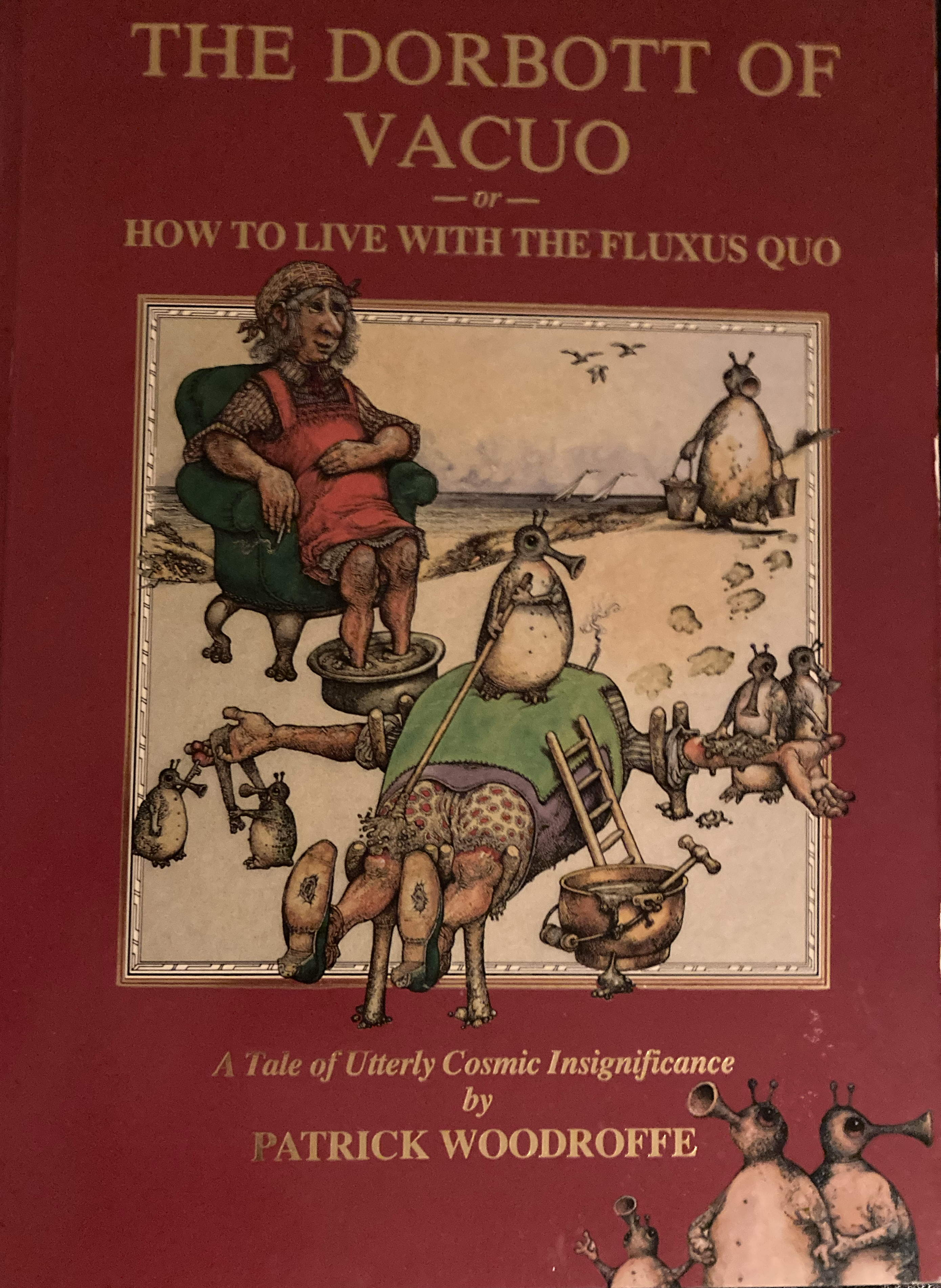
- cover of 1988 Limpback Edition
- Author: Patrick_Woodroffe
- Publication date: 1987
- ISBN: 1-85028-046-0

The Dorbott of Vacuo – or – How to Live with the Fluxus Quo: A Tale of Utterly Cosmic Insignificance is a novel by Patrick Woodroffe published in 1987.

== Plot summary ==
The Dorbott of Vacuo is a novel in which surreal landscapes form hazards.

This is the story of two worlds, both – in their different ways – in chains. In Corporesano nothing stood still. In Regulo Five nothing moved. The first contact between these diametrical opposites was uncomfortably physical, leading from acrimonious litigation to the threat of interplanetary war. Common sense – of a kind – ultimately prevails however, and peace – of a kind – is restored to this tiny corner of the unknown universe. And as for the Dorbott, he – like all the wise – allows neither time nor tide to interfere with his appreciation of a good tune. (from the back cover of the 1988 Limpback Edition, ISBN 978-1-85028-047-7)

== Reception ==
Dave Langford reviewed The Dorbott of Vacuo for White Dwarf #100, and stated that "The illustrations are spiffy; the text puts it in the same class of eruditely funny "children's" books as Fungus the Bogeyman, which should be praise enough."

== Reviews ==
- Science fiction, fantasy, & horror
