= The Second Earth: The Pentateuch Re-told =

The Second Earth: The Pentateuch Re-told is a novel by Patrick Woodroffe published in 1987.

== Contents ==
The Second Earth: The Pentateuch Re-told is illustrated by the author.

== Reception ==
Dave Langford reviewed The Second Earth: The Pentateuch Re-told for White Dwarf #99, and stated that "its prose content asphyxiates in the rarefied air of quasi-biblical High Style which even Tolkien couldn't bring off."

== Reviews ==
- Review by Andy Robertson (1988) in Interzone, #24 Summer 1988
