= Fields (progressive rock band) =

English progressive rock band

Fields were an English progressive rock band formed in 1971 by drummer Andrew McCulloch, keyboardist Graham Field, and bassist-vocalist Alan Barry. McCulloch had previously been a member of King Crimson, appearing on the band's third album Lizard. Field founded Rare Bird in 1968 and departed in early 1971, and Barry was a former member of The Dowlands (aka The Dowland Brothers, 1962–1963) with the Giles brothers Peter and Michael who would eventually become members of King Crimson.

Fields released one album, Fields, in 1971, and one single from the album, "A Friend of Mine", in 1973. They did record a second album in 1972 with ex-Supertramp bassist-vocalist Frank Farrell replacing the departed Alan Barry, but the record was shelved by CBS and not initially released. The master tapes of this album were re-mastered and released as Contrasts: Urban Roar to Country Peace in 2015, with the full involvement of Graham Field.

According to Fields, CBS management changed and "the new faces did not want to know us", so the group disbanded. Field had the rights to the name Rare Bird, and returned to working in that area and in television themes. McCulloch went on to become a founder member of Greenslade. Barry went on to become a founder member of the late 1970s-era UK rock band, King Harry.

== Lineup ==
- Graham Field - organ, piano
- Andrew McCulloch - drums, percussion
- Alan Barry - bass, guitars, vocals
