= Future Legends =

Album by Fruupp

Studio album by Fruupp
- Released: 5 October 1973
- Recorded: July 1973
- Studio: Escape Studios in Egerton, Kent
- Genre: Progressive rock
- Length: 39:37
- Label: Dawn
- Producer: Denis Taylor

Fruupp chronology
Future Legends (1973)	Seven Secrets (1974)

Professional ratings
Review scores
Source	Rating
AllMusic	4/5 stars

Future Legends is the debut studio album by Irish progressive rock band Fruupp. Recorded in July 1973 and produced by Denis Taylor, it was released on 5 October in the United Kingdom on the Dawn Records label, a subsidiary of Pye Records for underground and progressive rock music. To promote the album, the band undertook a two-month tour which finished on 29 November with a concert in The Whitla Hall, Belfast where they played with the Ulster Youth Orchestra.

The track "On a Clear Day" written by Stephen Houston featured in the first hundred vinyl pressings of Future Legends but was later withdrawn from the album. It resurfaced as a bonus track in the 2009 Esoteric Recordings remastered edition.

== Track listing ==
All tracks are written by Vincent McCusker, except "Graveyard Epistle" written by McCusker and Paul Charles, and "On a Clear Day" written by Stephen Houston.

Side one
No.	Title	Length
1.	"Future Legends"	1:27
2.	"Decision"	6:21
3.	"As Day Breaks with Dawn"	4:58
4.	"Graveyard Epistle"	6:14

Side two
No.	Title	Length
5.	"Lord of the Incubus"	6:20
6.	"Olde Tyme Future"	5:33
7.	"Song for a Thought"	7:25
8.	"Future Legends"	0:47
Total length:		39:37

2009 Esoteric Recordings remastered edition bonus track
No.	Title	Length
9.	"On a Clear Day"	7:49
Total length:		47:26

== Personnel ==
=== Fruupp ===
- Peter Farrelly – lead vocals, bass guitar; cover painting
- Stephen Houston – keyboards, oboe, vocals; arrangements (including strings)
- Vincent McCusker – guitars, vocals
- Martin Foye – drums, percussion

=== Technical personnel ===
- Denis Taylor – producer
- Tony Taverner – engineer
- Michael Rennie – conductor (strings)
- Paul Charles – cover concept
- Marie O'Connell – inside photograph
