= From Souvenirs to Souvenirs =

Single by Demis Roussos

from the album Souvenirs
- B-side: "Sing An Ode To Love"
- Released: 1975
- Recorded: 1974
- Length: 3:25
- Label: Philips
- Songwriters: Alec R. Costandinos, Stélios Vlavianós
- Producer: Demis Roussos

Demis Roussos singles chronology
"Schön wie Mona Lisa (Wenn ich ein Maler wär')" (1975)	"From Souvenirs to Souvenirs" (1975)	"Perdoname" (1975)

Music video
- "From Souvenirs to Souvenirs" (French TV, 1975) on YouTube

"From Souvenirs to Souvenirs" is a song by Greek singer Demis Roussos from his 1975 album Souvenirs. It was also released as a single (in 1975 on Philips Records).

== Background and writing ==
The song was written by the Greek composers Alec R. Costandinos and Stélios Vlavianós. The recording was produced by Demis Roussos. In 1975, the same year Roussos released the song, it was performed in Greek by Greek singer Marinella.

== Popularity in the Soviet Union ==
In the Soviet Union, "From Souvenirs to Souvenirs" was the most popular of all of Demis Roussos's songs. According to radio presenter Boris Barabanov, Roussos didn't consider "From Souvenirs to Souvenirs" an international hit and before one of his first concerts in the USSR in the 1990s Barabanov had to explain to him that the audience would not let him leave the stage without singing "From Souvenirs to Souvenirs".

=== Russian cover versions ===
There were several Russian-language covers of the song.

A year after the release of Demis Roussos' original, the song was covered by Zhanna Bichevskaya. Her version, with lyrics by Andrey Bogoslovsky, was titled "Risuyut Malchiki Voynu" ("Рисуют мальчики войну", "Boys Draw War").

In 1977 "From Souvenirs to Souvenirs" was covered by the band Krasniye Maki. Their version was called "First Love" and became immensely popular. It was played at discos everywhere and became one of popular songs to sing with a guitar. In 1995 "First Love" was covered by the band Russkiy Razmer. The new version was much heavier. The Russian rock band Agatha Christie also performed "First Love" at their concerts.

== Other versions ==
Roussos recorded a German version of this song (titled "Mein Leben ist ein Souvenir") on his 1976 German-language album Die Nacht und der Wein.

== Track listing ==
7" single Philips 6009 632 (1975, France, Germany, Italy, Spain, etc.)
7" single RTB / Philips S 53856 (1975, Yugoslavia)

A. "From Souvenirs To Souvenirs" (2:35)
B. "Sing an Ode to Love" (4:08)

== Charts ==
Monthly chart performance for "From Souvenirs to Souvenirs"
Chart (1977)	Peak position
Soviet Union International Songs (MK)	2
