= Souvenirs (Demis Roussos album) =

Studio album by Demis Roussos
- Released: March 1975
- Label: Philips

Demis Roussos chronology
Auf Wiedersehn (1974)	Souvenirs (1975)	Happy to Be... (1976)

Singles from Souvenirs
- 1. "From Souvenirs to Souvenirs" Released: 1975; 2. "Perdoname" Released: 1975; 3. "Midnight Is the Time I Need You" Released: 1975

Souvenirs is the fifth studio album by Greek singer-songwriter Demis Roussos, released in 1975, by Philips Records.

== Commercial performance ==
The album reached no. 25 in the UK and no. 13 in the Netherlands. It also spent 21 weeks in the Norwegian chart, peaking at no. 2.

== Track listing ==
No.	Title	Length
1.	"Sing an Ode to Love"	4:08
2.	"Midnight Is the Time I Need You"	3:00
3.	"I'll Be Your Friend"	3:59
4.	"Action Lady"	2:59
5.	"Winter Rains"	3:38
6.	"From Souvenirs to Souvenirs"	2:35
7.	"Trying to Catch the Wind"	3:15
8.	"White Wings"	3:36
9.	"Tell Me Now"	2:21
10.	"Names"	2:59
11.	"Perdoname"	2:59

== Charts ==
Chart (1975–1976)	Peak position
Dutch Albums (Album Top 100)	13
Norwegian Albums (VG-lista)	2
UK Albums (OCC)	25

== Certifications ==
Region	Certification	Certified units/sales
France (SNEP)	Gold	100,000^{*}
United Kingdom (BPI)	Gold	100,000^{^}
^{*} Sales figures based on certification alone.^{^} Shipments figures based on certification alone.
