= Hymn of Panathinaikos =

Song
- Released: 1958

The Hymn of Panathinaikos or Syllogos Megalos (Great Club) is the anthem of Panathinaikos A.O. It was written in 1958. The music is by Giorgos Mouzakis, a well-known musician and trumpeter of the era, and the lyrics are by George Oikonomidis. Leandros Papathanasiou and the Trio Belcanto and later Giannis Vogiatzis were the singers.

According to the composers, the song was written after a winning game of Panathinaikos, while they left together the Leoforos Alexandras Stadium. Oikonomidis improvised the first verse "Syllogos Megalos..." and Mouzakis sketched a staff on a cigarette pack on the spot. The whistling heard in the beginning and end of the hymn imitates the style of "Colonel Bogey March" from the 1957 film The Bridge on the River Kwai. The term "Syllogos Megalos" (the Great Club) is often used as a nickname for the club.

== Great Club ==
Greek Σύλλογος μεγάλος δεν υπάρχει άλλος δεν υπάρχει άλλος πιο δυναμικός και χιλιάδες φίλοι, μόλις δουν τριφύλλι, ζήτω λένε ο Παναθηναϊκός. Παναθηναϊκέ-Παναθηναϊκέ Παναθηναϊκέ μεγάλε και τρανέ. Παναθηναϊκέ-Παναθηναϊκέ πρωταθλητή σ' όλα τα σπορ παντοτινέ. Σ' έχουνε δοξάσει οι γνωστοί σου άσσοι που λεβέντες είναι όλοι με καρδιά. Χαίρεται η Ελλάδα που 'χει τέτοια ομάδα, που της νίκης έχει πάντα τα κλειδιά. Παναθηναϊκέ-Παναθηναϊκέ Παναθηναϊκέ μεγάλε και τρανέ. Παναθηναϊκέ-Παναθηναϊκέ πρωταθλητή σ' όλα τα σπορ παντοτινέ.	Phonetic Síllogos Megálos, den ipárchi állos den ipárchi állos pio dinamicos Ke chiliádes fíli, molis dun trifíli "zíto!", léne, "o Panathinaikos!" Panathinaike, Panathinaike, Panathinaike megále ke trané Panathinaike, Panathinaike, Protathliti se ola ta sport pantótine Se échoune doxási i gnosti su ássi pu levéntes ine oli me kardiá. Chérete i Elláda, pou echi tetia omáda pu tis nikis échi pánta ta klidiá. Panathinaike, Panathinaike, Panathinaike megále ke trané Panathinaike, Panathinaike, Protáthliti se ola ta sport pantótine	English Great club, there is no other one there is no other one that is more dynamic And thousands of fans, when they see the shamrock "viva!", they say, "Panathinaikos!" Panathinaikos, Panathinaikos, Panathinaikos great and mighty Panathinaikos, Panathinaikos, Everlasting champion in every sport. You have been glorified by your famous aces who are all brave men with heart. Greece is happy with such a team, that always has the keys to victory. Panathinaikos, Panathinaikos, Panathinaikos great and mighty Panathinaikos, Panathinaikos, Everlasting champion in every sport.

== Older hymns ==
=== First hymn (1931) ===
The first Hymn of Panathinaikos was recorded in Berlin in 1931, by Phonycord-Flexible. Till 2024, only the refrain was thought to have survived, but a single surviving 45 rpm disk was discovered and subsequently digitized.

Greek Δοξασμένος, τιμημένος είναι ο Παναθηναϊκός της Αθήνας το καμάρι πάντοτε θα είναι αυτός Αντικρίζοντας τη δόξα εις τα γήπεδα προβάλλει με τη θρυλική σημαία για να τη δοξάσει πάλι Ζήτω ένδοξε μεγάλε ζήτω ένδοξε τρανέ της πατρίδας μας καμάρι ζήτω Παναθηναϊκέ Ένας είναι το καμάρι και τη δόξα έχει αυτός o δαφνοστεφανωμένος ο Παναθηναϊκός Λευκοπράσινη φανέλα κι έχει ως σήμα το τριφύλλι τον φοβούνται οι εχθροί του και τον αγαπούν οι φίλοι Ζήτω ένδοξε μεγάλε ζήτω ένδοξε τρανέ της Αθήνας μας καμάρι ζήτω Παναθηναϊκέ	Phonetic Zíto éndoxe megále Zíto éndoxe trané Tis Athinas mas kamári Zíto Panathinaíke!	English Glorified, honored is Panathinaikos the pride of Athens it shall always be Facing the glory In the stadiums it emerges with the legendary flag to glorify it again Long live you great and glorious Long live you great and grandee Our homeland's pride Long live Panathinaikos! One is the pride And the glory is his The laurelled one Panathinaikos White and green jersey And his badge is the shamrock Feared by his enemies and loved by his friends Long live you great and glorious Long live you great and grandee Our Athens' pride Long live Panathinaikos!

=== Second hymn: "Προχωρείτε προς την Νίκη" (1948) ===
The second hymn was created in 1948 by Kostas Kofiniotis, who wrote the lyrics and Giannis Vellas, who composed the score. It was sung by Panos Kokkinos and titled "Προχωρείτε πρός την Νίκη"(Make your way to Victory).

Greek Το χίλια εννιακόσια οκτώ ιδρύθει στην Ελλάδα ο πιο μεγάλος σύλλογος η πιο τρανή ομάδα. Για σύμβολο της έστησε την πράσινη σημαία στον στίβο και στα γήπεδα την πιο τρανή ιδέα. Προχωρείτε προς τη νίκη, χείμαρρος ορμητικός έχει σήμα το τριφύλλι και είναι πάντα θρυλικός. Ο Παναθηναϊκός, ο Παναθηναϊκός, ο Παναθηναϊκός!	Phonetic To hília eniakósia októ idríthei stin Elláda O pió megálos síllogos I pió traní omáda Gia símboló tis éstise tin prásini siméa ston stívo ke ta gípeda tin pió traní idéa Prohoríte prós tí níki hímaros ormitikós éxi síma tó trifíli ke ínæ pánta ormitikós O Panathinaikos, O Panathinaikos, O Panathinaikos!	English In 1908, was founded in Greece, The greatest club, the greatest team. For its symbol it set the green flag, in running tracks and arenas the greatest idea. Make your way to victory, as an impetuous torrent has the shamrock as its symbol and is always legendary. Panathinaikos, Panathinaikos Panathinaikos!
