= Modern Masquerades =

Studio album by Fruupp
- Released: 14 November 1975
- Recorded: August – September 1975
- Studios: Basing Street, London
- Genre: Progressive rock
- Length: 49:00
- Label: Dawn
- Producer: Ian McDonald

Fruupp chronology
The Prince of Heaven's Eyes (1974)	Modern Masquerades (1975)

Singles from Modern Masquerades
- 1. "Janet Planet" b/w "Why" Released: 24 October 1975

Professional ratings
Review scores
Source	Rating
AllMusic	3/5 stars

Modern Masquerades is the fourth and final studio album by Irish progressive rock band Fruupp, released on 14 November 1975 in the United Kingdom on the Pye label's underground and progressive music imprint Dawn Records. Recorded from August to September 1975 at Basing Street Studios in London, it was produced by multi-instrumental musician Ian McDonald, best known as a founding member of King Crimson and Foreigner. In addition to the production role, McDonald also played alto saxophone and percussion.

Modern Masquerades proved to be the only Fruupp's recording without founding keyboardist Stephen Houston who had been replaced by John Mason in early 1975. The supporting tour commenced in Hastings on 5 December 1975 and finished in Manchester on 2 February 1976.

American hip-hop artist Talib Kweli used "Sheba's Song" as the basis for his track "Soon the New Day" from the album Eardrum (2007) which reached number 2 on the US Billboard 200 chart.

== Track listing ==
Side one
No.	Title	Lyrics	Music	Length
1.	"Misty Morning Way"	Vincent McCusker	McCusker	6:57
2.	"Masquerading with Dawn"	McCusker	McCusker	7:16
3.	"Gormenghast"	John Mason	Mason	10:47

Side two
No.	Title	Lyrics	Music	Length
4.	"Mystery Might"	McCusker	McCusker	8:23
5.	"Why"	McCusker	McCusker	4:12
6.	"Janet Planet"	Paul Charles	McCusker	2:58
7.	"Sheba's Song"	Charles	Mason	8:28
Total length:				49:00

== Personnel ==
=== Fruupp ===
- Peter Farrelly – lead vocals, bass guitar
- John Mason – keyboards, vibes, vocals, French horn arrangements
- Vincent McCusker – lead guitars, vocals
- Martin Foye – drums, percussion, vocals

=== Additional musicians ===
- Ian McDonald – alto saxophone, percussion, French horn arrangements; producer
- Greg Bowen – trumpet
- Terry Johnes – French horns
- Barry Castle – French horns
- Frank Ryecroft – French horns
- Peter Civil – French horns

=== Technical personnel ===
- Chris Kimsey – engineer
- Dave Hutchins – assistant engineer
- Martin Cropper – art direction
- Richard Strong – art direction
- Martin Goddard – photography
- Robert Howe – illustration
