= The Web (band) =

English band

The Web were an English band. Hailing from the British psychedelic scene, their style is often described as atmospheric, moody, melancholy, and dark.

They were originally fronted by African-American singer John L. Watson, with whom they released two studio albums, Fully Interlocking (1968) and Theraposa Blondi (1970). The band increasingly delved into a progressive rock sound with which Watson's vocal style was incompatible, so they set Watson up with a solo career and replaced him with keyboardist/vocalist Dave Lawson. Shortening their name to simply Web, the band fully embraced their new jazz-prog sound on their third LP, I Spider (1970). Following the departure of saxophonist/flautist Tom Harris, the band changed names again, to Samurai.

A final, self-titled album followed in 1971. With the band losing steam due to financial struggles and lack of recognition, Lawson accepted an invitation to join Greenslade.

== Members ==
- John L. Watson – vocals (1968-70)
- Dave Lawson – vocals/keys (1970-71)
- Tom Harris – woodwind
- John Eaton – guitar
- Tony Edwards – guitar
- Dick Lee-Smith – bass
- Lennie Wright – drums/percussion
- Kenny Beveridge – drums/percussion

== Discography ==
=== Singles ===
- "Hatton Mill Morning" / "Conscience" - Deram DM 201 - 1968
- "Baby Won't You Leave Me Alone" / "Mcvernon Street" - Deram DM 217 - 1968 – UK #52 (Note: Chart position is from the official UK "Breakers List".)
- "Monday to Friday" / "Harold Dubbleyew" Deram DM 253 - 1969

=== Albums ===
- Fully Interlocking - Deram SML 1025 - 1968
- Theraphosa Blondi - Deram SML-R 1058 - 1969
- I Spider - Polydor 2383 024 - 1970 (as Web)
- Samurai - Greenwich Grammophone Co. GSLP 1003 - 1971 (as Samurai)
