= T2 (band) =

English rock band

- Origin: London, England, United Kingdom
- Genres: Progressive rock; hard rock; art rock; proto-metal
- Years active: 1970–1972; 1992–1997
- Labels: Decca, World Wide
- Past members: Pete Dunton; Bernie Jinks; Keith Cross; John Weir; Andy Bown; Mike Foster; Alex Friedman; Gordon Crump; Ray Lee

T2 were an English rock band from London, formed in 1970, best known for their 1970 album, It'll All Work Out in Boomland.

== Origins ==
T2 evolved from an earlier band, Neon Pearl, which was led by their drummer, Pete Dunton. Dunton was by 1968 a member of Please, which also included fellow Neon Pearl member Bernard Jinks. When that band broke up in 1969, due to Dunton's joining Gun alongside Adrian Gurvitz, Jinks became a member of Bulldog Breed.

== Career ==
T2 was formed when Dunton reunited with bassist Jinks and late period Bulldog Breed guitarist, Keith Cross. The trio played a form of psychedelic or proto-prog rock, which was similar in content to that played by the earlier bands its members had been in. T2 were formed and managed by John Morphew, who had previously managed Bulldog Breed; he financed the formation and successfully signed them to Decca for the then enormous sum of £10,000 in advance royalties. However, internal strife caused Morphew to give up on T2 and leave them to their own devices.

After recording their debut album, It'll All Work Out in Boomland, T2 played a series of successful dates, including an appearance at the Isle of Wight Festival 1970, write-ups for which likened Cross to a new Eric Clapton. They did a spot on BBC 2 and then returned to the studio to begin work on their follow-up. However, the number of LPs pressed was limited and associated publicity was poor; hence, finding a copy in a record shop was difficult. In 1972, while recording material for their second album, T2 disbanded due to internal conflict. The breakup caused the unfinished album to be shelved until the early 1990s.

It'll All Work Out in Boomland was issued on CD by the German label World Wide Records, remastered from the original recording tapes. However, apparently both the original mix down information and the original mix down tapes had been lost, and as a result there are minor aural differences between the LP and CD versions. A South Korean label issued the album on CD, but this was suspected to have been copied from an original vinyl pressing. The CD issue sparked a brief T2 reunion, but without Keith Cross, who was the band's breakout star. The band now consisted of Dunton, Jinks and Moore. T2 released Second Bite (1992), Waiting For The Band (1993) and On The Frontline (1994). By the time Waiting For The Band was released, Jinks had left T2 and Moore had shifted to bass to accommodate their new guitarist, Ray Lee.

In 1992, the Swedish neo-prog band Landberk covered "No More White Horses" on their album Lonely Land. Decca Records released the box sets Legend of a Mind (2003) and Strange Pleasures (2008). Each included a remastered track from It'll All Work Out in Boomland, respectively "No More White Horses" and "JLT".

Concurrent with the reformation of T2, an album of acetate demos recorded in 1970 was released in 1997. Known initially as Fantasy and later issued simply as T2 or 1970, this album featured material written by the original lineup after the release of It'll All Work Out In Boomland. In 2012, a third album of demos entitled 1971-1972 was released by Acme Records, compiling material written and recorded by Dunton and a further succession of musicians, after Cross and Jinks had departed the lineup.

Drummer and vocalist Peter Dunton died of brain cancer on January 20, 2022.

== Discography ==
- 1970: It'll All Work Out in Boomland
- 1992: Second Bite
- 1993: Waiting For The Band
- 1994: On The Front Line
- 1997: Fantasy (aka T2 or 1970) - demos recorded in 1970
- 2012: 1971-1972 - demos recorded during the eponymous period
