= Giorgos Mouzakis =

Greek virtuoso trumpeter and music composer

Giorgos Muzakis (Greek: Γιώργος Μουζάκης; 15 August 1922 – 27 August 2005) was a prominent Greek virtuoso trumpeter and music composer.

== Career ==
Born in Metaxourgeio, Athens in 1922, Mouzakis performed first as a trumpeter in 1938, recording his first album in 1946. He studied at the Athens Conservatoire (1939–1947) and continued his education in Austria and Germany (1952–1954). Many of his compositions were for the theater.

A productive composer with influences from tango, bolero and bossa nova tunes, Mouzakis' opus consists of some 2,500 tunes and songs for over 200 plays, 20 musical comedies, and about 60 films. His best-known compositions are: "The Slave Woman" (Η Σκλάβα), "My Weakness" (Αδυναμία μου), "A friend from the past" (Ένας φίλος ήρθε από τα παλιά) "I whistle to you" (Σου σφυρίζω), "The Hymn of Panathinaikos" (ο Ύμνος του Παναθηναϊκού) and many more.

He was a member of the Greek Composers' Society and National Music Association and performed widely in Greece and abroad including America, Australia, Bulgaria, Canada, Poland and Romania. A resident of Athens, Mouzakis received a presidential distinction in 2003.

He died in 2005 in Athens.
