= Greenslade =

English progressive rock band

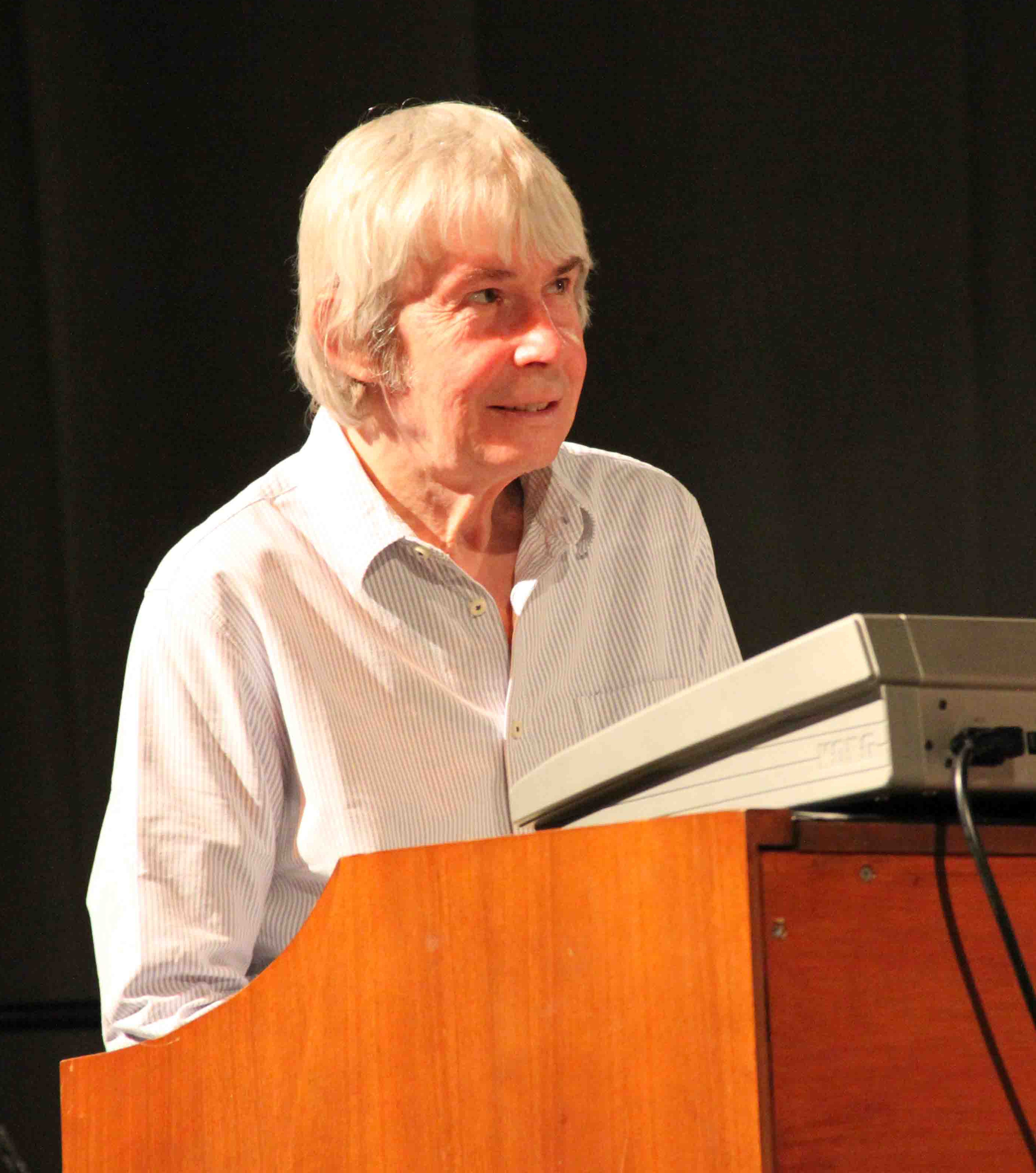
- Dave Greenslade in Wissen, June 2011

Background information
- Origin: London, England
- Genre: Progressive rock
- Years active: 1972–1976; 1977; 2000–2003
- Past members: Dave Greenslade; Dave Lawson; Andrew McCulloch; Tony Reeves; Martin Briley; Dave Markee; Simon Phillips; Mick Rogers; Jon Hiseman; John Young; John Trotter; James Gambold
- Website: The Greenslade Website

Greenslade were an English progressive rock band, formed in the autumn of 1972 by keyboard player Dave Greenslade and bassist Tony Reeves, with keyboardist Dave Lawson and drummer Andrew McCulloch.

== History ==
The band made their live debut at Frankfurt's Zoom Club in November 1972. Longtime musical associates, with a common background in jazz, Greenslade and Reeves had been original members of Colosseum. The two decided they wanted to form a band with two keyboardists. At the time, Reeves was A&R director for the independent progressive label Greenwich Gramophone Co., and he invited Dave Lawson of Samurai, a commercially struggling act with the label, to become part of the group. Lawson was previously a member of The Alan Bown Set and Web, whilst drummer Andrew McCulloch was briefly a member of King Crimson and Fields.

On 20 February 1973 the band appeared on BBC's The Old Grey Whistle Test playing two numbers - "Pilgrims Progress" and "Bedside Manners Are Extra", both from the album Bedside Manners Are Extra.

Greenslade's third album, Spyglass Guest was their most commercially successful, reaching number 34 in the UK Albums Chart. Reeves left shortly after the album was finished so that he could focus on his career as a producer, and was replaced on the U.S. tour and subsequent fourth album Time And Tide by Martin Briley, who also contributed guitar and backing vocals. Briley came to the group under the recommendation of Lawson, who had met him while doing session work.

Greenslade announced their disbandment in early 1976 due to management problems. The band felt their management company, Gaff Management, were not a good fit for them and wanted to sign with another big management company who had expressed interest in them, so they asked to be released from their contract. According to Dave Greenslade, "they told me they'd let us go if we paid them an absolute fortune. I didn't have that kind of money available, and therefore had no chance of getting away from them. This really soured our relationship to such an extent that, in the end, I split up the band to get away from them." Dave Greenslade went on to record his debut solo album, Cactus Choir, in late 1976 and then in early 1977 put together a new band line-up with ex-Manfred Mann's Earth Band frontman Mick Rogers. Initially the rhythm section consisted of Dave Markee and Simon Phillips, who had played on the album, but they were replaced by Tony Reeves (who had in the meantime joined Curved Air) and Jon Hiseman (then concurrently leading his own Colosseum II) for the 1977 dates.

In 2000, Greenslade and Reeves, after considering a full-blown reunion of the original line-up, teamed up with vocalist/keyboardist John Young, and recorded a new Greenslade studio album: Large Afternoon. Drummer John Trotter joined in time for a subsequent tour, during which the live album Greenslade 2001 – Live: The Full Edition was recorded. The album was released in 2002. John Trotter left the group the following year to move to Australia, and was to be replaced by James Gambold, but nothing further happened.

After Greenslade's original breakup, Dave Lawson went on to be a much-in-demand session musician, as well as playing with Roy Harper and later Stackridge. Thereafter he composed for film and television, including soundtracks for advertisements for British Gas and others. Martin Briley had a moderately successful solo career before finding work as a songwriter for popular artists such as Celine Dion and NSYNC. Andrew McCulloch left the music industry, obtained a Masters Certificate and pursued a career in sailing.

Dave Greenslade died in June 2026, at the age of 83.

== Personnel ==
- Dave Greenslade – keyboards (1972–1976, 1977, 2000–2003)
- Dave Lawson – keyboards, vocals (1972–1976)
- Andrew McCulloch – drums, percussion (1972–1976)
- Tony Reeves – bass guitar, double bass (1972–1974, 1977, 2000–2003)
- Martin Briley – bass guitar, guitar, backing vocals (1974–1976)
- Dave Markee – bass guitar (1977)
- Simon Phillips – drums, percussion (1977)
- Mick Rogers – guitar, vocals (1977)
- Jon Hiseman – drums, percussion (1977; died 2018)
- John Young – keyboards, vocals (2000–2003)
- John Trotter – drums, percussion (2000–2003)
- James Gambold – drums (2003)

== Discography ==
=== Studio albums ===
- 1973: Greenslade, Warner Bros. K 46207
- 1973: Bedside Manners Are Extra, Warner Bros.K 46259
- 1974: Spyglass Guest, Warner Bros.K 56055 UK No. 34 Warner Bros.
- 1975: Time and Tide, Warner Bros. K 56126
- 2000: Large Afternoon

=== Live albums, compilations ===
- 1973: Reading Festival 1973 (one track), GML Records 1008
- 1979: The Pentateuch of the Cosmogony, Dragon's World Ltd/EMI Records ISBN 0 905895 49 5
- 1997: Shades of Green (1972–75)
- 2000: Live (recorded in 1973–75)
- 2002: Greenslade 2001 – Live The Full Edition
- 2013: Live in Stockholm – 10 March 1975
- 2019: Sundance - A Collection 1973 - 1975 - Esoteric recordings a Cherry Red Records label

=== UK singles ===
- "Temple Song" / "An English Western" (1973)
- "Catalan" / "Animal Farm" (1975)
- "Gangsters" (theme from the eponymous TV series) / "Rubber Face & Lonely Eyes" (1976)
