= Can't Say How Much I Love You =

1976 single by Demis Roussos

Single by Demis Roussos

from the album Happy to Be...
- B-side: "Bahia Blue"
- Released: 13 February 1976
- Genre: Pop
- Length: 2:32
- Label: Philips
- Songwriter(s): Robert Rupen
- Producer(s): Demis Roussos

Demis Roussos singles chronology
"Die Bouzouki, die Nacht und der Wein" (1976)	"Can't Say How Much I Love You" (1976)	"When Forever Has Gone" (1976)

"Can't Say How Much I Love You" is a song by Greek singer-songwriter Demis Roussos from his sixth studio album, Happy to Be... (1976).

== Track listing and formats ==
- UK 7-inch single

A. "Can't Say How Much I Love You" – 2:32
B. "Bahia Blue" – 2:34

- French 7-inch single

A. "Can't Say How Much I Love You" – 2:30
B. "This Time It Isn't Au-Revoir" – 3:20

== Credits and personnel ==
- Demis Roussos – producer, vocals
- Robert Rupen – songwriter
- Jon Kelly – engineering
- Jon Walls – engineering
- Michel Boutroux – engineering
- Jean-Michel Bourguignon – engineering
- Danny Bridges – engineering
- Roger Roche – engineering
- Dominique Poncet – engineering
- Alain Marouani – cover art, photographer

Credits and personnel adapted from the Happy to Be... album and 7-inch single liner notes.

== Charts ==
Weekly chart performance for "Can't Say How Much I Love You"
Chart (1976)	Peak position
Belgium (Ultratop 50 Wallonia)	38
France (SNEP)	46
UK Singles (OCC)	35
