= Perdoname (Demis Roussos song) =

Single by Demis Roussos

from the album Souvenirs
- Released: 1975
- Label: Philips
- Songwriter(s): Alec R. Costandinos, Mario Capuano, Giosy Capuano, Mario Zelinotti
- Producer(s): Demis Roussos

Demis Roussos singles chronology
"From Souvenirs to Souvenirs" (1975)	"Perdoname" (1975)	"Vagabund der Liebe" (1975)

Music video
- "Perdoname" (TopPop, 1975) on YouTube

"Perdoname" is a song by Greek singer Demis Roussos from his 1975 album Souvenirs. It was also released as a single (in 1975 on Philips Records).

== Background and writing ==
The song was written by Alec R. Costandinos, Mario Capuano, Giosy Capuano, and Mario Zelinotti. The recording was produced by Demis Roussos.

== Commercial performance ==
The single reached no. 6 in the Netherlands and no. 5 in Belgium (Flanders).

== Track listing ==
7" single Philips 6009 642 (1975, France, Portugal, etc.)
7" single RTB / Philips S 53897 (1975, Yugoslavia)

A. "Perdoname" (2:59)
B. "I'll Be Your Friend" (3:59)

7" single Philips 6042 015 (1975, Netherlands)

A. "Perdoname" (3:01)
B. "From Souvenirs To Souvenirs" (2:37)

== Charts ==
=== Weekly charts ===
Chart (1975)	Peak position
Belgium (Ultratop 50 Flanders)	5
Netherlands (Dutch Top 40)	5
Netherlands (Single Top 100)	6

=== Year-end charts ===
Chart (1975)	Position
Belgium (Ultratop Flanders)	49
Netherlands (Dutch Top 40)	64
Netherlands (Single Top 100)	80
