= Bob Downes =

British jazz musician

Robert George Downes (born 22 July 1937 in Plymouth) is an English avant-garde jazz flautist and saxophonist. He is known for his work with Mike Westbrook and for leading the Open Music Trio since 1968. Downes is also a composer, arranger, and singer of rock and blues.

== Career ==
His first album was released by Philips Records in 1969. He was voted best jazz flautist and formed various ensembles. He started his own record label, Openinan. He played with the John Barry 7, pop singer Chris Andrews, Manfred Mann's Earth Band, and the Jimmie Nicol Band.

In 1968 he formed the Open Music Trio. The trio has included at bass Paul Bridge, Andrew Cleyndert, Jeff Clyne, Barry Guy, Mark Megiddo, Harry Miller, Glen Moore, Barre Phillips, and Daryl Runswick.

Downes played and recorded with Ray Russell's Rock Workshop and singers Elke Brooks, Alex Harvey, and Julie Driscoll. In the 1970s he was a member of Barry Guy's London Jazz Composers Orchestra. He also played with the Mike Westbrook Band and the Keith Tippett Band.

Downes composed for modern dance with The Royal Ballet, The London Contemporary Dance Theatre (with whom he composed and played live with between 1972 and 1982), Ballet Rambert, Dance Theatre of Harlem, The Royal Canadian Ballet, Australian Dance Company, Miami World Ballet, Komische Oper Berlin, Staatstheater Stuttgart, and Hong Kong Ballet. He composed for and performed with the Swiss mime group Mummenschanz. Downes performed at a poetry festivals in Amsterdam, Paris, and Rome with William S. Burroughs, Gregory Corso, and Lawrence Ferlinghetti.

=== Albums ===
On Diversions Downes played concert, alto, and Chinese bamboo flutes and tenor sax. Five of the eight pieces are trios with double bass (Barry Guy and Jeff Clyne) and drums (Denis Smith). The other three pieces are solos: on "Samurai" Downes played concert and alto flutes into a piano with the sustain pedal pressed down to give a tuned resonance. In 2007 Diversions was re-released by Vocalion.

Hells Angels has a long big-band piece covering side one of the original LP (subtitled 'A Visit to the Devil'), with a set of trio pieces on side 2. Downes plays mainly sax on this record (tenor and alto). After moving to Germany in the late 1970s, Downes released several further records, including Solos (c. 1984), an LP of solo flute improvisations (concert, alto and bass).

== Discography ==
=== As leader ===
- Bob Downes' New Sounds for Flute, Percussion, and Synthesizer (JW Theme Music, 1970)
- Deep Down Heavy (Music for Pleasure, 1970)
- Open Music (Philips, 1970)
- Electric City (Vertigo, 1970)
- Diversions (Openian, 1971)
- Episodes at 4 AM (Openian, 1974)
- Hells Angels (Openian, 1975)
- South American Journey (Openian, 1985)
- Songs for Mother Earth (Sacral/Bauer Studios Ludwigsburg, 1997)
- Flashback (Openian, 2009)
- Crossing Borders (Reel, 2009)
- 5 Trios (Openian, 2010)
- New York Suite (Openian, 2011)
- Mixed Bag (Openian, 2012)
- Blowin' with Bass (Openian, 2016)
- It's a Mystery (ReR, 2017)
- A Blast...from the Past (Openian, 2018)

=== As sideman ===
- Andwellas Dream, Love and Poetry (CBS, 1969)
- Barry Guy & the London Jazz Composers Orchestra, Ode (Incus, 1972)
- Julie Driscoll, 1969 (Polydor, 1971)
- Paddy Kingsland, The Changes Original Television Soundtrack (Silva Screen, 2018)
- Joe Meek, Joe Meek Freakbeat (Castle Music, 2006)
