= Fruupp =

1970s progressive rock band

- Origin: Belfast, Northern Ireland
- Genres: Progressive rock
- Years active: 1971–1976
- Label: Dawn
- Past members: Vincent McCusker; Peter Farrelly (deceased); Stephen Houston; Martin Foye; John Mason (deceased)

Fruupp were a 1970s Irish progressive rock band, which originated in Belfast, Northern Ireland, but developed a fan base in Great Britain. They were relatively popular, particularly on the student scene and as a supporting act, opening for such bands as Genesis, Queen, and King Crimson.

== History ==
The group was assembled by guitarist Vincent McCusker in early 1971 in Belfast, and consisted primarily of classically trained musicians Peter Farrelly (bass guitar and lead vocals), Stephen Houston (keyboards and oboe), and Martin Foye (drums and percussion). After two years of performing, they created a demo tape, and were signed by Pye Records for their underground music and progressive rock label Dawn Records. Between 1973 and 1975, the group released four studio albums and three singles. Despite having played hundreds of concerts in the United Kingdom and mainland Europe during that time, no live output had yet been released, although audience bootleg recordings of live shows in England and Ireland do exist. A concert at the Friars Aylesbury club played on 6 December 1975 was recorded using a mobile unit for a possible album Live at Friars Aylesbury, but the master tapes were later destroyed by fire in a flat the musicians shared in Peckham, London.

In January 1975, Stephen Houston left the band and became a clergyman. He was replaced by John Mason, with whom Fruupp recorded their last album, Modern Masquerades (1975), produced by multi-instrumentalist Ian McDonald, best known as a founder of King Crimson and Foreigner. Although the band was working on the fifth album Doctor Wilde's Twilight Adventure in 1976, poor record sales along with the advent of the punk/new wave movement caused Fruupp to break up in the end of the year.

In 2022, a new Fruupp live double album was released on the Bad Pressings label, Masquerading With Dawn. It featured the same performance from 6 December 1975 that had originally been intended for release, the newly discovered recording being remastered and released as a limited edition.

A Twilight Adventure is the title of the Fruupp box set, created in 2023. It borrows its title from the band's unreleased fifth studio album and contains a DVD, a book and a CD, amongst other items relating to the band.

Peter Farrelly died in March 2025, at the age of 76.

Solace is a new album by ‘Fruupp & Friends,’ release date October 2026, in memory of Peter Farrelly. It contains new Fruupp music, written and performed by Vincent McCusker, with Martin Foye on some tracks. Also music inspired by Fruupp, performed by friends of the band, as well as original live tracks by Fruupp and band members’ later bands.

== Personnel ==
- Vincent McCusker – guitar, vocals (1971–1976)
- Peter Farrelly – bass guitar, guitar, lead vocals (1971–1976; died 2025)
- Martin Foye – drums, percussion (1971–1976)
- Stephen Houston – keyboards, oboe, vocals (1971–1975)
- John Mason – keyboards, vibes, vocals (1975–1976)

== Discography ==
=== Studio albums ===
- Future Legends (Dawn, 5 October 1973)
- Seven Secrets (Dawn, 19 April 1974)
- The Prince of Heaven's Eyes (Dawn, 8 November 1974)
- Modern Masquerades (Dawn, 14 November 1975)

=== Compilation albums ===
- Songs for a Thought (Sequel, 1992)
- It's All Up Now: Anthology (Castle Music, 1 November 2004)
- Solace: Fruupp & Friends (Bad Pressings, 2026; new and remixed live Fruupp tracks, covers and tribute tracks)

=== Singles ===
- "The Prince of Darkness" b/w "Annie Austere" (Dawn, 11 October 1974) - planned but never released
- "Prince of Heaven" b/w "The Jaunting Car" (Dawn, 18 October 1974)
- "Janet Planet" b/w "Why" (Pye, 24 October 1975)
- ”Annie Austere” b/w “Decision” - Live (Bad Pressings, 15 December 2021)

=== Live albums ===
- Live - Masquerading With Dawn (Bad Pressings, 2022; Archival material recorded on December 6, 1975)
