= Leo Leandros =

Greek musician, composer and record producer (1923–2025)

- Λεό Λέανδρος
- Born: Leandros Papathanasiou; 23 August 1923; Astakos, Aetolia-Acarnania, Greece
- Died: 31 October 2025 (aged 102); Pefki, Euboea, Greece
- Other name: Mario Panas
- Citizenship: Greece; Germany
- Education: Humboldt University
- Occupations: Musician; composer; singer; songwriter; lyricist; record producer
- Years active: 1956–2012
- Notable work: Hymn of Panathinaikos (1958)
- Spouses: Kyriaki Protopapa (div. 1961) Venetia Dimakarakou (m. 1985)
- Children: 4, including Vicky

Leo Leandros (Greek: Λεό Λέανδρος; born Leandros Papathanasiou (Λέανδρος Παπαθανασίου); 23 August 1923 – 31 October 2025) was a Greek musician, composer, singer, songwriter, lyricist and record producer.

== Life and career ==
Born on 23 August 1923 in Astakos, Leandros left in the 1950s for Germany to pursue a career in singing and composing. He had some success, but shifted his focus to his daughter, Vicky, who had been singing from a very early age. He became her manager, composer and producer when she was 13 and took charge of her training and career. Under his pseudonym Mario Panas (Greek: Μάριο Πάνας) he was the co-composer (together with Klaus Munro) of "Après toi", the winner of the Eurovision Song Contest 1972, which Vicky performed for Luxembourg.

Leandros composed and produced for many other artists such as Julio Iglesias, Demis Roussos, Nana Mouskouri, Ulli Martin, Freddy Quinn and Jairo, among others. In 1983, he retired but returned exclusively to the studio in the early 1990s for three albums with Vicky Leandros. His albums have sold over 120 million worldwide. A low-profile personality, Leandros avoided public appearances. In October 2005 though, he appeared on German/Austrian television as a surprise guest for his daughter who was celebrating her 30-year stage Jubilee. He was also the first singer of the Hymn of Panathinaikos.

He turned 100 on 23 August 2023, and died on 31 October 2025, at the age of 102.

== Discography ==
#	Year	Side Α	Side Β	Disc
1		Leandros: Hali – Halima		78 rpms
2		Leo Leandros: Hali – Halima	B-side: Mary Linda: Mirtia	Columbia – CTZ 10165 (78 rpm); Turkey
3	1957	Conchita	Kleine Violetta	Philips P 44 800 H (78 rpm); Germany
4	1957	Das ist die Fiësta	Schwarze Rosita	Philips P 44 816 H (78 rpm); Philips 344 816 PF (45 rpm); Germany
5	1958	Bongo Billy	Kongo Bongo	Philips P 44 867 H (78 rpm); Philips 344 867 PF (45 rpm); Germany
6	1958	Cielito lindo (So ist die Liebe)	In Bordeaux	Philips P 44 894 H (78 rpm); Philips 344 894 PF (45 rpm); Germany
7	1957	Tigi-tigi-tio	Marie, Stern von Napoli	Philips P 44 956 H (78 rpm); Philips 344 956 PF (45 rpm); Germany
8	1957	Komm, Mister Tallimann (Banana-boat Song)	Pepino (Guaglione)	Philips P 44 956 H (78 rpm); Philips 344 971 PF (45 rpm); Germany
9	1958	Come Prima	Viva l'Amore	Philips 345 000 PF; Germany
10	1958	Chella-Llà	Kuli-Song	Philips 345 014 PF (release #1); Germany
11	1958	Chella-Llà	Wenn dich ein Torero küßt	Philips 345 030 PF (release #2); Germany
12	1958	Hunderttausend Cruzieros	Mucho Amore	Philips 345 050 PF; Germany
13	1958	Bambina	Eine Reise ins Glück	Philips 345 055 PF (45 rpm); Germany
14	1958	Chella-llà / Cielito lindo	Komm, Mister Talliman / Wenn Dich ein Torero küsst	Philips 345 089 PF (45 rpm); Germany
14	1958	Hey Käpt'n – Rolling Home	Kari waits for me	Philips 345 089 PF; Germany
15	1959	Carmen Ramona	Alle Mädchen wollen küssen (Be mine)	Philips 345 127 PF; Germany
16	1959	Ich Träume vom Süden	Oft weint der Himmel Tränen	Philips 345 146 PF; Germany
17	1959	Einsam sind alle Strassen	Das Pfennig Lied (Penny Song)	Philips 345 154 PF; Germany
18	1959	Ay ay ay Paraquay	Mädchen von Napoli	Philips 345 170 PF (45 rpm); Germany
19	1959	Carina	Marina	Philips 345 197 PF (45 rpm); Germany
20	1960	Blaue Nacht in Sansibar	Sieben Jahre lang	Philips 345 205 PF; Germany
21	1960	Im Hafen unsrer großen Liebe	Anita	Philips 345 223 PF; Germany
22	1960	Mustafa	Mondschein und Meer	Philips 345 228 PF; Germany
23	1960	Tum Bailalaika	Fährt ein Boot nach Kalamo	Philips 345 270 PF; Germany
24	1961	Bananas	Schabada	Philips 345 300 PF; Germany
25	1961	Treu wie ein Hund (with Peter Beil)	Die Story vom alten Joe (with Peter Beil)	Philips 345 319 PF; Germany
26	1961	Eines Tages (Michael Row the Boat)	Flieg in die Heimat	Philips 345 326 PF; Germany
27	1961	Hasta La Vista	Signorina Bella	Philips 345 328 PF; Germany
28	1962	Die Liebe kam (Gitarren-Tango)	Am Kai von Korsika	Philips 345 364 PF; Germany
29	1962	Lebwohl, Jasmina	Bambus-Bambina	Philips 345 399 PF; Germany
30	1963	Man spricht Spanisch	Madrielenia (Ding-Dong-Bossa-No)	Germany
31	1963	Der Liebling von Allen (Uno per tutte)	In der Cantina Mexicana	Philips 345 575 PF; Germany
32	1963	Picolina	Deine kirschenroten Lippen	Philips 345 580 PF; Germany
33	1963	Picolina	Deine kirschenroten Lippen	Philips JF 329 004; Holland
34	1964	Irgendwo in Athen	Manina (In Summer)	Philips 345 635 PF; Germany
35	1964	Kara Ben Jusuf	Jeder weint einmal	Philips 345 677 PF; Germany
36	1964	Die Liebe ist so schön	Dinah-Lu	Philips 345 731 PF; Germany
37	1965	Glaub' daran	Rag Doll	Philips 345 786 PF; Germany
38	1965	Was einmal war	So schön wie Du	Philips 345 788 PF; Germany
39	1965	Warte auf das Glück	Ich tu's für Dich	Philips 345 818 PF; Germany
40	1965	Wenn die Bouzoukis klingen	Sirtaki Time	Philips 345 863 PF; Germany
41	1965	Frag doch nur dein Herz	Bleib bei mir, geh' nicht fort	Philips 345 863 PF; Germany
42	1965	Dein Herz ist kalt wie Eis	Unsre Sonne	Philips 345 897 PF; Germany
43	1966	Allein sein ist schwer	Einmal wird er vor Dir stehen	Philips 346 033 PF; Germany
44	1966	So viel Liebe (Quando Dico Che Ti Amo)	Du fährst nicht gut dabei	Philips 346 039 PF; Germany
45	1967	Heute ist heut (Let's live for today)	Heimweh (Memories are made of this)	Philips 346 068 PF; Germany
46	1967	Glaube an das Leben (Zai, Zai, Zai)	Tausend hübsche Mädchen	Philips 384 514 PF; Germany
47	1968	La Felicitad	Nimm's nicht so schwer	Philips 384 546 PF; Germany
48	1968	An jenem Tag (Those were the days)	Maria	Philips 384 564 PF; Germany
49	1968	Ma va la	40.000 Mark	Philips 388 364 PF; Germany
50	1968	Χαμένα όνειρα (Hamena Oneira – Those were the days)	Το κορίτσι της γκιόνας (To koritsi tis gionas)	Philips 6299; Greece
