= Andrew McCulloch (drummer) =

English drummer (born 1945)

Andrew McCulloch (born 19 November 1945, Bournemouth) is an English drummer who worked with Fields, Greenslade, Manfred Mann Chapter Three, Anthony Phillips, Peter Banks, the Crazy World of Arthur Brown and King Crimson in the 1970s before becoming a yachtmaster.

== Biography ==
He spent his childhood in Hiroshima and elsewhere outside the UK. He began playing the drums at the age of 18 after returning to England. Joined Bournemouth's band Shy Limbs. He recorded for the first time in autumn 1968, and 9 May 1969 was his record debut.

After drumming for Manfred Mann in early 1970, he became Michael Giles' replacement in King Crimson. He appeared on just one King Crimson album, the jazz-influenced Lizard, released in 1970.

He joined Greenslade at its inception in 1972, remaining with them until their dissolution in 1976. He then guested on several releases, including "Opus One" with the London Philharmonic Orchestra, before leaving the music business. Despite at the time being referred to in The Guardian as being one of the most skillful and inventive drummers working anywhere in the jazz or rock spectrum, he left to become more involved with his other love, sailing.

As an RYA Yachtmaster instructor he skippered and taught on several yachts around Greece, Turkey, Cyprus, Italy, France, Spain, Lebanon and Antigua.

He now charters his own yachts around the Greek Islands in the summer season, as well as teaching, skippering and examining.
