= A Night at Studio 54 =

Compilation album by various artists
- Released: June 1979
- Recorded: 1977–1979
- Genre: Disco
- Length: 61:24
- Label: Casablanca
- Producers: Steve Rubell; Ian Schrager

A Night at Studio 54 is a compilation album released by Casablanca Records in June 1979, featuring disco music played frequently at New York City's famous nightclub Studio 54. Conceived by the record label and direct response television company I&M Marketing with the co-operation from Studio 54 founders Steve Rubell and Ian Schrager, A Night at Studio 54 was also a double album, with its music segued between tracks by disc jockeys Marc Paul Simon and Roy Thode for continuous playing, reminiscent of the nightclub itself. The album was originally going to contain crowd noise recorded at the club too, but the idea was dropped before release as it brought a decrease in sound quality.

Believing the album wouldn't sell with traditional promotion based on the album's content being readily available elsewhere, I&M Marketing's campaign for the album saw them spend $100,000 on advertising on radio and television, tagging local retailers in different regions on the spot. The campaign was a success and the album peaked at number 21 on the Billboard 200 chart. The album was also a critical success and was certified Gold by the Recording Industry Association of America (RIAA) for sales of over 500,000 copies, although the album went on to sell almost a million copies. Despite the album's success, it has been out of print since its original release and has not been re-released on CD.

== Background, content and marketing ==
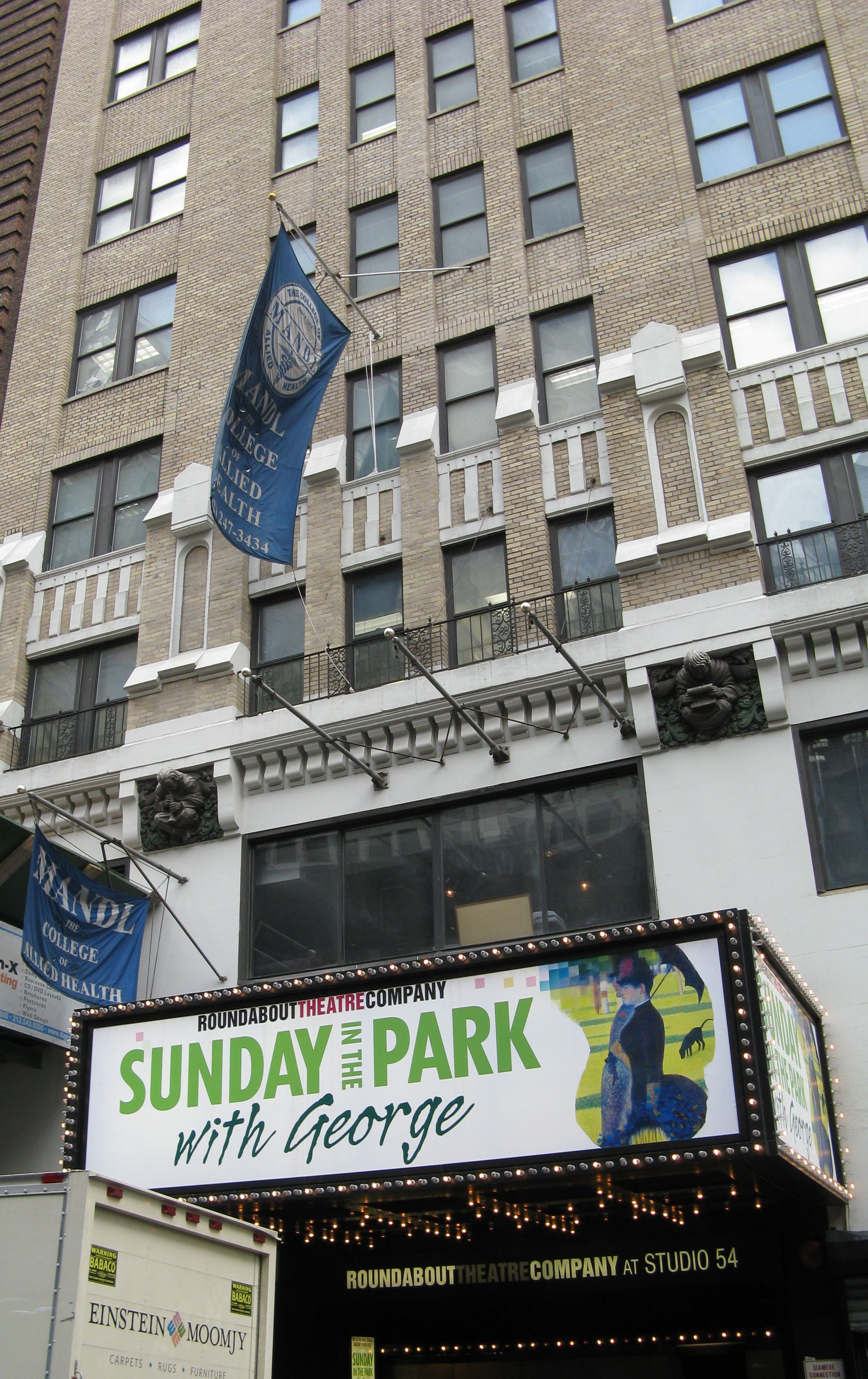
The location of Studio 54 in 2008.

Nightclub and discotheque Studio 54, located at 254 West 54th Street, between Eighth Avenue and Broadway in Manhattan, New York City, was founded and opened by Steve Rubell and Ian Schrager in 1977, and by 1979 it had become a world-famous front for disco music. The genesis for A Night at Studio 54, a compilation featuring music from the club, came about when was Rubell and Schrager were looking to release spin-off products from the disco. With the co-operation of Studio 54 themselves, as Schrager and Rubell are credited as the album's executive producers, A Night at Studio 54 was conceived by disco label Casablanca Records and I&M Teleproducts, an early example of a direct response television music company founded in 1976 by Morris Levy and Ira Pittleman; naturally, I&M Teleproducts also marketed the album.

A Night at Studio 54 is a double album that features 17 disco tracks popularized and played regularly at Studio 54; according to music critic Robert Christgau, the album includes all of disco's AM radio crossover successes "plus major floor hits." Rubell described the album as "the equivalent of a night at Studio 54." The songs on the album are mixed together by Studio 54 DJs Marc Paul Simon and Roy Thode for continuous playing reminiscent of a DJ set at the club. One account later noted it was unusual that Richie Kaczor did not sequence the album instead. Originally, the album was to feature crowd sounds recorded at Studio 54, but the idea was later dropped "because a comparison of two recordings led to the conclusion that better audio quality would be thus obtained."

Since the album contained previously released hits, Pittleman and Levy, credited as the album's associate producers, decided that A Night at Studio 54 "wasn't going to get any airplay time–and people wouldn't be looking for it in the bins," as Pittleman later recalled, so in order to promote the album, they "spent hundred of thousands of dollars in TV and radio advertising and co-ordinated region by region with local retailers by tagging them in the spot." The album was advertised on the front of Billboard magazine as an "electrifying 2-record set" which includes the "hottest hits" from the artists featured.

== Release and reception ==
Professional ratings
Review scores
Source	Rating
Christgau's Record Guide	B

Casablanca Records released A Night at Studio 54 in June 1979; according to Casablanca's executive vice president Larry Harris, copies of the album were shipped out on June 27, 1979 with an excess of almost 500,000 orders. The cover art of the gatefold sleeve features Studio 54's "54" logotype in silver and gold, while inside the sleeve are four photographs that depict the club, while the discs themselves are housed in their own inner sleeves. Bob Carrol was credited for the album packaging's art and design and Gilbert Lesser for the logo design. In the liner notes, Schrager and Rubell thanked the club's followers: "To all our guests at Studio 54, whose energy made this record possible... Our sincere thanks!"

With its huge advertising backing, the album ultimately reached number 21 on the Billboard 200 album chart and sold close to a million copies. A Night at Studio 54 was I&M Teleproducts' biggest success, and according to Billboard magazine, "paved the way for the innovative marketing strategies that [Pittleman] would later define," since he would later promote the compilations released by companies such as Heartland Music in a similar fashion. The album also debuted at number 70 on the Billboard Soul LPs chart on the week ending August 4, 1979, and peaked at number 37 on the week ending September 1, 1979. On August 21, 1979, the album was certified "Gold" by the Recording Industry Association of America (RIAA) for sales of over 500,000 copies.

Critical reception to the compilation was also favourable. Village Voice critic Robert Christgau called it "the ultimate disco sampler," although also expressing that "only sometimes AM can be gross (Cher) and sometimes floor hits are bland (or worse) away from the floor (not to mention on it) (Love and Kisses, Musique, the unspeakable Patrick Juvet). I find even the two usable sides resistible, and miss the Three Degrees' 'Steve Rubell Medley': 'Walk Right In,' 'Cocaine Blues," and 'Jailhouse Rock.'" The album features in Joel Whitburn's book Top Pop Albums 1955-1992. Having been out of print since 1979, A Night at Studio 54 has not since been re-released on Compact Disc.

== Personnel ==
- Ian Schrager - executive producer
- Steve Rubell - executive producer
- Morris Levy - associate producer
- Ira Pittleman - associate producer

== Track listing ==
Side one
No.	Title	Writer(s)	Producer(s)	Length
1.	"Le Freak" (performed by Chic)	Bernard Edwards; Nile Rogers	Bernard Edwards; Nile Rogers	4:25
2.	"Let's All Chant" (performed by Michael Zager Band)	Michael Zager; Alvin Fields	Michael Zager	2:50
3.	"Y.M.C.A." (performed by Village People)	Jacques Morali; Henri Belolo; Victor Willis	Jacques Morali	3:12
4.	"Disco Nights (Rock-Freak)" (performed by G.Q.)	Emmanuel Rahiem Le Blanc; Herb Lane; Keith Crier; Paul Servic	Jimmy Simpson; Beau Ray Fleming	5:28

Side two
No.	Title	Writer(s)	Producer(s)	Length
5.	"Take Me Home" (performed by Cher)	Michelle Aller; Bob Esty	Bob Esty	5:51
6.	"I Love the Nightlife" (performed by Alicia Bridges)	Alicia Bridges; Susan Hutcheson	Steve Buckingham	2:44
7.	"I Found Love (Now That I Found You)" (performed by Love & Kisses)	Alec R. Costandinos	Alec R. Costandinos	3:26
8.	"Last Dance" (performed by Donna Summer)	Paul Jabara	Paul Jabara; Giorgio Moroder; Bob Esty	6:44

Side three
No.	Title	Writer(s)	Producer(s)	Length
9.	"Got to Be Real" (performed by Cheryl Lynn)	Cheryl Lynn; David Paich; David Foster	David Paich; Marty Paich	5:10
10.	"I Got My Mind Made Up (You Can Get It Girl)" (performed by Instant Funk)	Kim Miller; Scott Miller; Raymond Earl		3:00
11.	"Hot Shot" (performed by Karen Young)	Andy Kahn; Kurt Borusiewicz	Andrew Kahn; Andy Kahn; Kurt Borusiewicz	3:04
12.	"I Love America" (performed by Patrick Juvet)	Patrick Juvet; Jacques Morali; Victor Willis	Jacques Morali	3:46

Side four
No.	Title	Writer(s)	Producer(s)	Length
13.	"Souvenirs" (performed by Voyage)	M. Chantereau; P.A. Dahan; S. Pezin	Roger Tokarz	2:36
14.	"Hot Jungle Drums and Voodoo Rhythm" (performed by D.C. LaRue)	D.C. LaRue; Bob Esty		2:50
15.	"In the Bush" (performed by Musique)	Patrick Adams; Sandra Cooper	Patrick Adams	3:33
16.	"Instant Replay" (performed by Dan Hartman)	Dan Hartman	Dan Hartman	4:46
17.	"Shake Your Groove Thing" (performed by Peaches & Herb)	Dino Fekaris; Freddie Perren	Freddie Perren	3:15
Total length:				1:01:24

== Charts ==
Chart (1979)	Peak position
US Billboard Soul LPs	37
US Billboard Top LPs & Tape	21

== See also ==
- Studio 54
- Casablanca Records
- Casino Classics: Chapter One
