= Patrick Juvet discography =

Swiss singer

- Studio albums: 10
- Soundtrack albums: 1
- Live albums: 2
- Compilation albums: 11
- Singles: 49
- Video albums: 1

This is the discography of Swiss singer Patrick Juvet.

== Albums ==
=== Studio albums ===
Year	Title	Details	Peak chart positions						
Year	Title	Details	AUS	CAN Dance	FRA	IT	QUE	SWE	US
1973	La musica	Released: April 1973; Label: Barclay; Formats: LP, MC, 8-track	—	—	—	—	—	—	—
1973	Love	Released: 1973; Label: Barclay; Formats: LP, MC	—	—	4	—	—	—	—
1974	Chrysalide	Released: September 1974; Label: Barclay; Formats: LP, MC	—	—	—	—	—	—	—
1976	Mort ou vif	Released: April 1976; Label: Barclay; Formats: LP, MC	—	—	2	—	—	—	—
1977	Paris by Night	Released: June 1977; Label: Barclay; Formats: LP, MC, 8-track	—	—	1	—	1	—	—
1978	Got a Feeling – I Love America	Released: April 1978; Label: Barclay, Casablanca; Formats: LP, MC	—	6	1	12	—	45	125
1979	Lady Night	Released: April 1979; Label: Barclay, Casablanca; Formats: LP, MC	88	—	1	18	—	18	—
1980	Still Alive	Released: December 1980; Label: Barclay; Formats: LP, MC	—	—	—	—	—	—	—
1982	Rêves immoraux	Released: March 1982; Label: Barclay; Formats: LP, MC	—	—	—	—	—	—	—
1991	Solitudes	Released: October 1991; Label: Baxter Music; Formats: CD, MC	—	—	—	—	—	—	—
"—" denotes releases that did not chart or were not released in that territory.

=== Live albums ===
Year	Title	Details
1974	Vous raconte son rêve – Olympia 1973	Released: 1974; Label: Barclay; Formats: LP
1980	"Live"	Released: 1980; Label: Barclay; Formats: 2xLP, MC

=== Soundtrack albums ===
Year	Title	Details
1979	Laura, les ombres de l'été	Released: September 1979; Label: Barclay; Formats: LP, MC; Soundtrack to the film of the same name

=== Compilation albums ===
Year	Title	Details	Peak chart positions
Year	Title	Details	BE (WA)
1978	Patrick Juvet	Released: June 1978; Label: Barclay; Formats: 2xLP, MC	—
1979	Le disque d'or	Released: February 1979; Label: Barclay; Formats: LP, MC	—
1980	Patrick Juvet	Released: 1980; Label: Barclay; Formats: LP; Different from the 1978 compilation	—
1982	16 grands succès	Released: 1982; Label: Barclay; Formats: LP, MC	—
1989	Master série	Released: 16 June 1989; Label: PolyGram; Formats: CD, MC	—
1994	La musica	Released: 1994; Label: Karussell/Spectrum Music/Barclay; Formats: CD	—
1995	Best Of	Released: 11 July 1995; Label: Barclay; Formats: CD, MC	24
2000	Best of Disco	Released: April 2000; Label: ULM; Formats: CD	—
2002	L’essentiel	Released: 7 October 2002; Label: Barclay; Formats: 2xCD	—
2008	Les 50 plus belles chansons	Released: 12 May 2008; Label: Barclay/Universal; Formats: 3xCD	—
2014	Best of 70	Released: 6 October 2014; Label: Barclay; Formats: 2xCD	—
"—" denotes releases that did not chart or were not released in that territory.

=== Video albums ===
Year	Title	Details
2019	Le meilleur de Patrick Juvet	Released: 20 February 2019; Label: INA/Elephant Classics Film; Formats: DVD

== Singles ==
Year	Title	Peak chart positions										Album
Year	Title	BE (WA)	CAN	FRA	IT	NL	QUE	SPA	SWE	UK	US Dance	Album
1971	"Romantiques pas morts"	—	—	—	—	—	—	—	—	—	—	La musica
1972	"La musica"	15	—	1	—	—	—	—	—	—	—	La musica
1972	" Au même endroit à la même heure"	25	—	18	—	—	—	—	—	—	—	La musica
1973	"Je vais me marier Marie"	19	—	23	—	—	—	—	—	—	—	La musica
1973	"Sonia"	14	—	11	—	—	—	—	—	—	—	La musica
1973	"Toujours du cinéma"	16	—	9	—	—	13	—	—	—	—	Love
1974	"Love"	48	—	32	—	—	—	—	—	—	—	Love
1974	"Rappelle-toi minette"	24	—	9	—	—	—	—	—	—	—	Love
1974	"Regarde"	37	—	24	—	—	—	—	—	—	—	Non-album single
1974	"C'est beau la vie"	—	—	21	—	—	—	—	—	—	—	Chrysalide
1974	"Ce n'est pas un chagrin d'amour"	—	—	—	—	—	—	—	—	—	—	Love
1974	"Nama"	43	—	37	—	—	—	—	—	—	—	Chrysalide
1974	"La chanson des enfants"	—	—	—	—	—	—	—	—	—	—	Chrysalide
1975	"Il est trop tard pour faire l’amour"	28	—	14	—	—	—	—	—	—	—	Non-album singles
1975	"Magic"	13	—	15	—	—	—	—	—	—	—	Non-album singles
1976	"Faut pas rêver"	21	—	10	—	—	—	—	—	—	—	Mort ou vif
1977	"Où sont les femmes?"	5	—	4	—	—	1	—	—	—	—	Paris by Night
1977	"Les bleus au cœur"	5	100	4	—	—	1	—	—	—	—	Paris by Night
1977	"Megalomania"	—	—	—	—	—	—	—	—	—	—	Paris by Night
1978	"I Love America"	—	—	6	10	34	—	29	19	12	5	Got a Feeling – I Love America
1978	"Got a Feeling"	—	—	20	—	17	—	4	—	34	5	Got a Feeling – I Love America
1978	"De plus en plus seul"	—	—	13	—	—	24	—	—	—	—	Non-album single
1979	"Another Lonely Man" (UK and Ireland-only release)	—	—	—	—	—	—	—	—	—	—	Got a Feeling – I Love America
1979	"Lady Night"	—	—	2	9	—	—	—	—	—	58	Lady Night
1979	"Viva California"	—	—	—	—	—	—	—	—	—	—	Lady Night
1979	"Swiss Kiss"	—	—	17	—	—	—	—	—	—	—	Lady Night
1979	"Laura (Tristesse de Laura)" (Germany-only release)	—	—	—	—	—	—	—	—	—	—	Laura, les ombres de l'été
1979	"One Way Love"	—	—	42	—	—	—	—	—	—	—	Laura, les ombres de l'été
1980	"Sounds Like Rock'n'Roll"	—	—	—	38	—	—	—	—	—	—	Still Alive
1980	"Transit"	—	—	—	—	—	—	—	—	—	—	Still Alive
1981	"Sans amour"	—	—	—	—	—	—	—	—	—	—	Non-album single
1982	"Rêves immoraux"	—	—	49	—	—	—	—	—	—	—	Rêves immoraux
1982	"Générique"	—	—	—	—	—	—	—	—	—	—	Non-album single
1982	"Alibi (I'm Dreaming)"	—	—	—	—	—	—	—	—	—	—	Rêves immoraux
1982	"Du tac au tac" (Spain and Italy-only release)	—	—	—	—	—	—	—	—	—	—	Rêves immoraux
1982	"Pas folle de moi (I'm a Survivor)" (Canada-only release)	—	—	—	—	—	1	—	—	—	—	Rêves immoraux
1982	"Cette fille" (Canada-only release)	—	—	—	—	—	1	—	—	—	—	Rêves immoraux
1983	"Getting to the Heart of Me"	—	—	—	—	—	—	—	—	—	—	Non-album singles
1984	"Je tombe amoureux" (b/w "L'amour n'est pas pressé")	—	—	—	—	—	— 30	—	—	—	—	Non-album singles
1986	"Thinking with Your Body"	—	—	—	—	—	—	—	—	—	—	Non-album singles
1987	"L'amour avec les yeux"	—	—	—	—	—	—	—	—	—	—	Non-album singles
1988	"Rêve"	—	—	—	—	—	—	—	—	—	—	Non-album singles
1991	"Solitudes"	—	—	—	—	—	—	—	—	—	—	Solitudes
1992	"Cruising Bar"	—	—	—	—	—	—	—	—	—	—	Solitudes
1993	"Deep Dark Night" (featuring Amnesia)	—	—	—	—	—	—	—	—	—	—	Non-album single
1995	"I Love America" (remix)	—	—	—	—	—	—	—	—	—	—	Best Of
1998	"Rester cool ?"	—	—	—	—	—	—	—	—	—	—	Non-album single
2000	"Ça c'est Paris"	—	—	98	—	—	—	—	—	—	—	Best of Disco
2010	"Don't Be Afraid"	—	—	—	—	—	—	—	—	—	—	Non-album single
"—" denotes releases that did not chart or were not released in that territory.
