= New Zealand top 50 singles of 1978 =

This is a list of the top 50 singles of 1978 in New Zealand.

== Chart ==
Key
‡ – Single of New Zealand origin

Number	Artist	Single
1	Boney M.	"Rivers Of Babylon"
2	John Travolta and Olivia Newton-John	"You're The One That I Want"
3	Wings	"Mull Of Kintyre"
4	Meat Loaf	"You Took The Words Right Out Of My Mouth"
5	Kate Bush	"Wuthering Heights"
6	Bee Gees	"Stayin' Alive"
7	Exile	"Kiss You All Over"
8	Parliament	"Flash Light"
9	Bee Gees	"Night Fever"
10	John Rowles	"Tania"
11	Commodores	"Three Times A Lady"
12	Frankie Valli	"Grease"
13	The Emotions	"Flowers"
14	Andy Gibb	"Shadow Dancing"
15	Clout	"Substitute"
16	A Taste of Honey	"Boogie Oogie Oogie"
17	Johnny Mathis and Deniece Williams	"Too Much, Too Little, Too Late"
18	Eruption	"I Can't Stand The Rain"
19	Peter Brown	"Dance With Me"
20	Samantha Sang	"Emotion"
21	Gerry Rafferty	"Baker Street"
22	10cc	"Dreadlock Holiday"
23	Uriah Heep	"Free Me"
24	Donna Summer	"Last Dance"
25	Scott Fitzgerald and Yvonne Keeley	"If I Had Words"
26	Hot Chocolate	"Every 1's a Winner"
27	Stargard	"Which Way Is Up"
28	Raydio	"Jack and Jill"
29	Sweet	"Love Is Like Oxygen"
30	The O'Jays	"Use Ta Be My Girl"
31	Dan Hill	"Sometimes When We Touch"
32	Graham Bonnet	"Warm Ride"
33	Olivia Newton-John	"Hopelessly Devoted to You"
34	Anne Murray	"You Needed Me"
35	John Paul Young	"Love Is In The Air"
36	Nick Gilder	"Hot Child In The City"
37	Bonnie Tyler	"It's A Heartache"
38	Meat Loaf	"Two Out of Three Ain't Bad"
39	Kellee Patterson	"If It Don't Fit, Don't Force It"
40	Village People	"Macho Man"
41	Billy Joel	"Just The Way You Are"
42	The Rolling Stones	"Miss You"
43	Barry Manilow	"Can't Smile Without You"
44	Bob Marley and the Wailers	"Is This Love?"
45	Dragon	"Are You Old Enough"
46	Walter Egan	"Magnet and Steel"
47	John Travolta and Olivia Newton-John	"Summer Nights"
48	Love & Kisses	"Thank God It's Friday"
49	Bob Welch	"Ebony Eyes"
50	Jackson Browne	"Stay"

== Chart by numbers ==
=== Origin ===
==== By artist ====
The following shows the country of origin from where the artist (including any featured artist where applicable) originate from. Artists who appear more than once have only been tallied once.

Country	Total
United States	24
England	11
Australia	3
New Zealand	2
Scotland	2
Germany	2
South Africa	1
Jamaica	1

Notes
- Boney M. are regarded as German for this tally.
- John Paul Young is Scottish-born Australian and has been tallied as Australia.
- John Travolta and Olivia Newton-John, John is from the United States and Olivia Newton-John is British-Australian, as such all three countries have been tallied.

==== By single ====
The following shows the country of origin from which the singles originate regardless of who the artist is.

Country	Total
United States	26
England	15
Australia	4
Germany	3
New Zealand	2
Scotland	2
South Africa	1
Jamaica	1

=== Most singles ===
Shows the artists with the most singles to appear in this chart.

Artist	Total
Bee Gees	2
Meat Loaf	2
John Travolta and Olivia Newton-John	2

=== Format ===
The following shows where each single appears on, whether it was the artists album, a non-album single, an extended play or as part of a soundtrack.

Format	Total
Albums	37
Soundtracks	8
non-album singles	5

Notes
- The songs "You're the One That I Want", "Grease", "Hopelessly Devoted to You" and "Summer Nights" are from the soundtrack Grease.
- The song "Last Dance" is from the soundtrack Thank God It's Friday.
- The song "Thank God It's Friday" is from the same soundtrack.
- The song "Too Much, Too Little, Too Late" was a non-album single at the time for Johnny Mathis and Deniece Williams before being included on their albums.

=== Multiple releases ===
The following shows singles that had multiple releases from the same album.

Title	Total	Singles
Saturday Night Fever (various)	2	Stayin' Alive (Bee Gees); Night Fever (Bee Gees)
Grease (various)	4	You're the One That I Want (John Travolta and Olivia Newton-John); Grease (Frankie Valli); Hopelessly Devoted to You (Olivia Newton-John); Summer Nights (John Travolta and Olivia Newton-John)
Bat Out of Hell (Meat Loaf)	2	You Took the Words Right Out of My Mouth; Two Out of Three Ain't Bad

=== Type ===
The following shows the denomination that each single was released as, whether as a solo artist or as part of a group, band or duo.

Type	Total
Solo artists	26
Groups	16
Duos	6
Collaborations	2

Notes
- John Travolta and Olivia Newton-John as well as Johnny Mathis and Deniece Williams have been regarded as duos.
- Scott Fitzgerald and Yvonne Keeley have been regarded as a collaboration.

=== Top Genre ===
The following shows the most common genres the Top 50 singles are regarded as (as per their genre descriptions in the singles entries. Where a genre was not noted, the genre of the album was used instead. Subgenres have been split as their own entry.

Genre	Total	Singles
Disco	18	Rivers of Babylon (Boney M.); You're the One That I Want (John Travolta and Olivia Newton-John); Stayin' Alive (Bee Gees); Flash Light (Parliament); Night Fever (Bee Gees); Boogie Oogie Oogie (A Taste of Honey); I Can't Stand The Rain (Eruption); Last Dance (Donna Summer); Which Way Is Up (Stargard); Jack and Jill (Raydio); Use ta Be My Girl (The O'Jays); If It Don't Fit, Don't Force It (Kellee Patterson); Macho Man (Village People); Miss You (The Rolling Stones); Thank God It's Friday (Love & Kisses); Dance With Me (Peter Brown); Shadow Dancing (Andy Gibb); Grease (Frankie Valli)
Pop	12	Mull of Kintyre (Wings); Wuthering Heights (Kate Bush); Tania (John Rowles)‡ Flowers (The Emotions); Every 1's a Winner (Hot Chocolate); Love Is Like Oxygen (Sweet); Sometimes When We Touch (Dan Hill); Can't Smile Without You (Barry Manilow); Are You Old Enough (Dragon)‡ Just The Way You Are (Billy Joel); Warm Ride (Graham Bonnet); Magnet and Steel (Walter Egan)
Soft rock	7	You Took the Words Right Out of My Mouth (Meat Loaf); Three Times a Lady (Commodores); Flowers (The Emotions); Baker Street (Gerry Rafferty); You Needed Me (Anne Murray); Just The Way You Are (Billy Joel); Ebony Eyes (Bob Welch)
Funk	5	Flash Light (Parliament); Boogie Oogie Oogie (A Taste of Honey); Every 1's a Winner (Hot Chocolate); Which Way Is Up (Stargard); Miss You (The Rolling Stones)
Soul	4	Three Times a Lady (Commodores); Use ta Be My Girl (The O'Jays); Too Much, Too Little, Too Late (Johnny Mathis and Deniece Williams); Is This Love? (Bob Marley and the Wailers)
R&B	3	Kiss You All Over (Exile); Three Times a Lady (Commodores); Jack and Jill (Raydio)

=== Top Labels ===
The following shows the most common record labels that a single was associated with. Any label that only had one single has not been noted.

Label	Total	Singles
RSO Records	7	Stayin' Alive (Bee Gees); Night Fever (Bee Gees); Grease (Frankie Valli); Shadow Dancing (Andy Gibb); Emotion (Samantha Sang); If I Had Words (Scott Fitzgerald and Yvonne Keeley); Love Is Like Oxygen (Sweet – US)
Columbia Records	3	Flowers (The Emotions); Too Much, Too Little, Too Late (Johnny Mathis and Deniece Williams); Ebony Eyes (Bob Welch)
Motown	2	Three Times a Lady (Commodores); Boogie Oogie Oogie (A Taste of Honey)
Casablanca Records	2	Flash Light (Parliament); Last Dance (Donna Summer)
Epic	2	You Took the Words Right Out of My Mouth (Meat Loaf); Two Out of Three Ain't Bad (Meat Loaf)

=== Top songwriters ===
The following shows the songwriters who had the most top-selling singles of 1978 in New Zealand.

Writer	Total	Singles
Barry Gibb	5	Stayin' Alive (Bee Gees); Night Fever (Bee Gees); Grease (Frankie Valli); Shadow Dancing (Andy Gibb); Emotion (Samantha Sang)
Robin Gibb	3	Stayin' Alive (Bee Gees); Night Fever (Bee Gees); Emotion (Samantha Sang)
Maurice Gibb	3	Stayin' Alive (Bee Gees); Night Fever (Bee Gees); Emotion (Samantha Sang)
Jim Steinman	2	You Took the Words Right Out of My Mouth (Meat Loaf); Two Out of Three Ain't Bad (Meat Loaf)
John Farrar	2	You're the One That I Want (John Travolta and Olivia Newton-John); Hopelessly Devoted to You (Olivia Newton-John)

=== Most/Least songwriters ===
The following shows the singles that were credited as having been written by only one person and the singles that had the most credited writers of 1978.

Single	Total	Songwriter/s
"Wuthering Heights" (Kate Bush)	1	Kate Bush
"Baker Street" (Gerry Rafferty)	1	Gerry Rafferty
"Stayin' Alive" (Bee Gees)	3	Barry Gibb; Robin Gibb; Maurice Gibb

=== Top producers ===
The following shows the producers who had the most singles to appear on this chart.

Producer	Total	Singles
Barry Gibb	4	Stayin' Alive (Bee Gees); Night Fever (Bee Gees); Shadow Dancing (Andy Gibb); Emotion (Samantha Sang)
Albhy Galuten	3	Stayin' Alive (Bee Gees); Night Fever (Bee Gees); Shadow Dancing (Andy Gibb)
Karl Richardson	3	Stayin' Alive (Bee Gees); Night Fever (Bee Gees); Shadow Dancing (Andy Gibb)
Todd Rundgren	2	You Took the Words Right Out of My Mouth (Meat Loaf); Two Out of Three Ain't Bad (Meat Loaf)
