= I Love America =

I Love America may refer to:

- "I Love America", a 1975 musical cantata by John W. Peterson
- "I Love America" (Patrick Juvet song), a 1978 disco hit by Swiss-born performer Patrick Juvet
- "I Love America", a 1983 single by American rock musician Alice Cooper, from his album DaDa
- "America (I Love America)", a 1996 song by English house music duo Full Intention
- I Love America (2022 film), a French comedy film
- I Love America (2001 film) (Estonian: Ma armastan Ameerikat), a film by Estonian musician and filmmaker Tõnu Trubetsky
