= Rogelio Melencio =

Filipino basketball player and coach

Personal information
- Born: September 27, 1939 Tondo, Manila, Philippine Commonwealth
- Died: April 30, 1994 (aged 54) Pasay, Philippines
- Listed height: 6 ft 2 in (1.88 m)

Career history

Playing
- Yutivo Opels
- Concepcion Industries

Coaching
- 1993: Philippines
- 1994: San Beda
Medals
Men's basketball
Representing Philippines
ABC Championship
Gold medal – first place	1967 Seoul	Team
Bronze medal – third place	1969 Bangkok	Team
Gold medal – first place	1973 Manila	Team
Head coach for Philippines
Gold medal – first place	1993 Singapore	Team

Rogelio C. Melencio (September 27, 1938 – April 30, 1994), also known as Tembong Melencio, was a former Filipino basketball player and coach.

== Career ==
Melencio was born in Tondo, Manila, Philippines. He played for the Yutivo Opels and later for Concepcion Industries in the Manila Industrial and Commercial Athletic Association. Melencio also appeared at the Olympic Games in Munich, Germany as a member of the country's national basketball team. He was also a key member of the Pesta Sukan Basketball Team, the 2nd national team of the Philippines beating the 1st national team in close exhibition games.

Melencio is also noted for leading a ragtag squad to a gold medal in the 1993 SEA Games.

By March 1994, Melencio was coach of the San Beda Red Lions.

== Death ==
Melencio is a casualty of the My Way killings dying on April 30, 1994. At a beerhouse, Melencio was stabbed by a man who he demanded to step down from a stage over his performance of the song "My Way".
