= You Must Be Love =

Studio album by Love & Kisses
- Released: 1979
- Genre: Euro disco
- Label: Casablanca
- Producer: Alec R. Costandinos

Love & Kisses chronology
How Much, How Much I Love You (1978)	You Must Be Love (1979)

You Must Be Love is the third and last album by Euro disco group Love & Kisses, released on Casablanca Records in 1979. On this 1979 album, Alec R. Costandinos composed all the tracks, such as the title cut. Also, this album features Katie Kissoon, Costandinos himself, Vicki Brown, credited on the back cover of the album as "Vickie Brown", Stephanie de Sykes, Arthur Simms, André Ceccarelli, credited on the back cover of the album as "Dede Ceccarelli", Liza Strike and Helen Chappelle.

== Track listing ==
All songs composed by Alec R. Costandinos.

1. "Ooh La La La La" 7:37
2. "Your Middle Name Is Money" 7:35
3. "Find Yourself A Dream" 4:42
4. "You Must Be Love"

== Personnel ==
- Bass – Mo Foster
- Drums – Joe Hammer
- Guitar – Ricky Hitchcock, Slim Pezin
- Keyboards – Alan Hawkshaw
- Percussion – Frank Ricotti, Ray Cooper
- Strings – Pat Halling String Ensemble
- Synthesizer – Alec R. Costandinos, Georges Rodi, Stephen W. Tayler
- Vocals – Alec R. Costandinos, Arthur Simms, Katie Kissoon, Stephanie de Sykes, Vicki Brown

Additional musicians

- Alto Saxophone – George Young (tracks: A1, A2, A3)
- Bass – Tony Bonfils (tracks: A1, A2, A3)
- Drums – André Ceccarelli (tracks: A1, A2, A3)
- Guitar – Jean-Claude Chavanat (tracks: A1, A2, A3)
- Percussion – Alec R. Costandinos & Emmanuel Roche (tracks: A1, A2, A3)
- Strings – Pat Halling String Ensemble (tracks: A1, A2, A3)
- Programming – Georges Rodi (tracks: A1, A2, A3)
- Synthesizer, Keyboards – Bernard Arcadio (tracks: A1, A2, A3)
- Tenor Saxophone – Michael Brecker (tracks: A1, A2, A3)
- Trumpet – John Faddis & Randy Brecker (tracks: A1, A2, A3)
- Vocals – Alec R. Costandinos, Arthur Simms, Helen Chappelle, Katie Kissoon & Liza Strike (tracks: A1, A2, A3)

Technical personnel

- Assistant engineers – Adam Moseley, Colin Green, Craig Milliner, Simon Hilliard
- Engineer, re-mixed by Stephen W. Tayler
- Photography by Scott Hensel
- Art direction, design – Gribbitt!, Henry Vizcarra
- Arranged & Conducted by – Raymond T. Knehnetsky
- Producer By – Alec R. Costandinos
- Arranged By, Conductor – Bernard Arcadio (tracks: A1, A2, A3)
