= Voyage (Voyage album) =

Studio album by Voyage
- Released: 1977
- Recorded: Trident Studios, London; Studios Ferber, Paris
- Genre: Disco
- Length: 33:47
- Label: Sirocco Records
- Producer: Roger Tokarz

Voyage chronology
| Voyage (1977) | Fly Away (1978) |

Professional ratings
Review scores
| Source | Rating |
|---|---|
| Allmusic | 4.5/5 stars |
| Christgau's Record Guide | B |

Voyage is the 1977 self-titled debut album by French disco group, Voyage. The songs on the album paid a nodding homage to musical styles of different regions of the world, as if the band and its listeners were taking a jet set trip around the world.

As was the case with a number of disco albums during the 1970s, all cuts of Voyage's debut release made it to number one on the U.S. disco chart. In Voyage's case, they went to number one on the disco chart with their debut release for three weeks. Although no cuts made the US pop singles chart, the single "From East to West" peaked at number 85 on the soul singles chart. "From East to West" went to number 13 on the UK Singles Chart.

== Track listing ==
Side A

1. "From East to West" - 7:08
2. "Point Zero" - 4:38
3. "Orient Express" - 5:00

Side B

1. "Scotch Machine" - 3:28 (known as "Scots Machine" in the UK to avoid causing offence in Scotland)
2. "Bayou Village" - 1:51
3. "Latin Odyssey" - 4:48
4. "Lady America" - 6:57

== Charts ==
| Chart (1977/78) | Peak position |
|---|---|
| Australia (Kent Music Report) | 93 |
| United Kingdom (Official Charts Company) | 59 |
| United States (Billboard 200) | 40 |

== Personnel ==
- Arranged By – Marc Chantereau, Pierre-Alain Dahan & Slim Pezin
- Bass, Other (Patience, Kindness) – Sauveur Mallia
- Drums & Percussion – Pierre-Alain Dahan
- Engineer (Mixing) – Stephen W. Tayler
- Engineer (Studios Ferber) – Paul Scemama
- Engineer (Trident Studios) – Peter Kelsey, Stephen W. Tayler
- Country Fiddle – Roger Churchyard
- Guitar & Percussion – Slim Pezin
- Keyboards & Percussion – Marc Chantereau
- Photography By (Cover) – Morton Beebe
- Pipe – David Milner, Ian Craig, Roddy McDonald
- Producer – Roger Tokarz
- Synthesizer – Georges Rodi
- Vocals – Bernard Ilous, Bobby McGee, Pierre-Alain Dahan, Slim Pezin, Cella Stella, Ekambi Brillant, Marc Chantereau, Emmanuelle Bale, Francine Chabot, Georges Costa, Kay Garner, Michael Costa, Stephanie de Sykes
