= One Step Higher =

Studio album by Voyage
- Released: December 1981
- Recorded: December 1981
- Genre: Disco
- Label: Atlantic

Voyage chronology
| Voyage 3 (1980) | One Step Higher (1981) |

One Step Higher is the fourth and last album by Voyage, recorded and released in the United States in December 1981 on Atlantic Records while the other version of this album was re-released again in France on Sirocco Records in 1982 and the rest of different versions on different record labels that same year from different countries. The song "Come And Get It" featured Arthur Simms on lead vocals.

== Track listing ==
All songs composed by Marc Chantereau, Pierre-Alain Dahan, and Slim Pezin.

Side A

1. "Let's Get Started" — 6:42
2. "Come and Get It" — 4:17
3. "One Step Higher" — 5:43

Side B

1. "I Surrender" – 4:53
2. "Nowhere to Hide" – 3:25
3. "Magic in the Groove" – 3:45
4. "Follow the Brightest Star" – 6:42

== Personnel ==
- Arranged by Marc Chantereau, Pierre-Alain Dahan, Slim Pezin
- Horns on "I Surrender" Arranged by – Don Ray
- Bass – Slim Pezin
- Bass on "Let's Get Started" and "Come And Get It" – Tony Bonfils
- Cover – Luigi Castiglioni
- Drums – Pierre-Alain Dahan
- Engineer – Claude Grillis, Stephen W. Tayler
- Executive Producer – Claudette Tokarz, Roger Tokarz
- Guitar – Slim Pezin
- Lead Vocals on "Come And Get It"– Arthur Simms
- Mixed By – Claude Grillis on "One Step Higher", Gene Leone on "Magic In The Groove", Stephen W. Tayler
- Percussion – Marc Chantereau, Pierre-Alain Dahan
- Producer – Marc Chantereau, Pierre-Alain Dahan, Roger Tokarz, Slim Pezin
- Synthesizer Programming – Georges Rodi
- Vocals – Ann Calvert, Arthur Simms, Bobby McGee, Carole Fredericks, George Chandler, Georges Costa, Jimmy Chambers, Jimmy Thomas, Kay Garner, Marc Chantereau, Michel Costa, Pierre-Alain Dahan, Slim Pezin, Stephanie de Sykes, Yvonne Jones
