= Fly Away (Voyage album) =

Studio album by Voyage
- Released: 1978
- Recorded: Trident Studios, London; Studios Ferber, Paris
- Genre: Disco
- Length: 33:21
- Label: Sirocco Records
- Producer: Roger Tokarz

Voyage chronology
Voyage (1977)	Fly Away (1978)	Voyage 3 (1980)

Professional ratings
Review scores
Source	Rating
Allmusic	3/5 stars

Fly Away is a 1978 album by the French disco group, Voyage. Their second release repeated the success of their debut released earlier in the year. All the cuts on Fly Away hit number one on the U.S. disco chart early in 1979 for one week. Unlike the cuts on their debut album, one track from Fly Away made the Billboard Hot 100 chart, when "Souvenirs" made it to number 41. The track also became Voyage's second and last chart entry in the U.S., reaching no. 73 on the soul singles chart. In the U.K., "Souvenirs" and "Let's Fly Away" both charted, reaching no. 56 and no. 38 respectively, with the latter their last U.K. chart entry.

"Souvenirs" became a disco staple and a disco smash hit in the Philippines during the rise of disco music in the early 1980s.

== Track listing ==
Side A

1. "Souvenirs" — 6:18
2. "Kechak Fantasy" — 3:02
3. "Eastern Trip" — 2:09
4. "Tahiti, Tahiti" — 5:07

Side B

1. "Let's Fly Away" – 5:07
2. "Golden Eldorado" – 4:56
3. "Gone with the Music" – 6:42

== Personnel ==
- Strings & Horns Arranged By – Marc Chantereau, Pierre-Alain Dahan, Slim Pezin
- Bass – Sauveur Mallia
- Drums & Percussion – Pierre-Alain Dahan
- Engineer – Paul Scemama, Stephen W. Tayler
- Guitar & Percussion – Slim Pezin
- Trumpet on "Golden Eldorado" – Pierre Dutour
- Keyboards, Percussion, Vocals – Marc Chantereau
- Lead Vocals – Sylvia Mason-James
- Producer – Roger Tokarz
- Programmed By – Joël Fajerman
- Synthesizer – Georges Rodi
- Steel Guitar on "Tahiti, Tahiti" – Pete Willsher
- Vocals – Bobby McGee, Georges Costa, Pierre-Alain Dahan, Slim Pezin, Kay Garner, Matai, Michael Costa, Moeani, Nick Curtis, Stephanie de Sykes, Tahia, Titi, Marc Chantereau
