= Thank God It's Friday (film) =

1978 film by Robert Klane

- Theatrical release poster
- Directed by: Robert Klane
- Written by: Armyan Bernstein
- Produced by: Neil Bogart; Rob Cohen; Phillip M. Goldfarb; Lauren Shuler
- Starring: Donna Summer; The Commodores
- Cinematography: James Crabe
- Edited by: Richard Halsey
- Music by: Giorgio Moroder
- Production companies: Casablanca FilmWorks; Motown Productions
- Distributed by: Columbia Pictures
- Release date: May 19, 1978
- Running time: 89 minutes
- Country: United States
- Language: English
- Budget: $2.2 million
- Box office: $7.3 million

Thank God It's Friday is a 1978 American musical comedy film directed by Robert Klane (in his directorial debut) and produced by Motown Productions and Casablanca FilmWorks for Columbia Pictures. Produced at the height of the disco craze, the film features the Commodores performing "Too Hot ta Trot" and Donna Summer performing "Last Dance", which won the Academy Award for Best Original Song in 1978. The film features an early performance by Jeff Goldblum and the first major screen appearance by Debra Winger. The film also features Terri Nunn in her only film role, who later achieved fame in the 1980s new wave group Berlin. This was one of several Columbia Pictures films in which the studio's "Torch Lady" came to life in the opening credits, showing off her moves for a few seconds before the start of the film.

== Plot ==
Thank God It's Friday tells several intertwining stories of the patrons and staff of the fictional Los Angeles disco The Zoo over the course of a single Friday evening. These people include:

- Tony Di Marco – owner of The Zoo. Lecherous and promiscuous, he's inordinately fond of his 1974 Porsche 911 Carrera.
- Bobby Speed – the club's DJ, who's broadcasting his first live show from the club.
- Frannie and Jeannie – two high school friends who want to win The Zoo's dance contest to buy Kiss concert tickets.
- Carl and Ken – a hopelessly near-sighted schlub looking for a casual liaison, and his friend looking for a girlfriend.
- Dave and Sue – a young married couple celebrating their fifth wedding anniversary.
- Jackie – dental hygienist by day, drugged-out disco freak and Zoo regular by night.
- Jennifer and Maddy – the new girl in town taken to the disco by her know-it-all friend who's not as sophisticated as she thinks she is.
- Nicole Sims – an aspiring disco singer.
- Marv Gomez – a self-described "leatherman" who lives to dance.
- Malcolm Floyd – the roadie for The Commodores, responsible for delivering their instruments to the club by midnight.
- Gus and Shirley – a mismatched couple on a blind date, arranged by a computing algorithm.

Sue insists that her uptight accountant husband Dave take her to the disco. On a bet with Bobby, Tony tries to pick up Sue. Dave is drugged and renamed "Babbakazoo" by Jackie, and makes a fool of himself. Carl and Ken are repeatedly thwarted in their attempts to meet girls. Frannie and Jeannie trick Marv into helping them sneak into the disco after several failed attempts at gaining entry. Jennifer tries to meet a guy, but Maddy vetoes each of the guys that Jennifer is attracted to. Nicole repeatedly attempts to slip into the DJ booth to get Bobby to play her single. Crude garbage collector Gus is horrified that the dating service has matched him with a prim college educated woman, and one who is taller than he is. Floyd gets stopped repeatedly by the police on suspicion of stealing The Commodores' instruments. Marv teaches the uptight Ken how to dance.

Maddy ditches Jennifer to attend a hot tub party (with the same sleazy guys who came on to Jennifer). Gus and Shirley decide to give it a try. Carl finally meets a girl, but becomes trapped in a stairway before they can leave together. Floyd makes it to the club in time for the Commodores to play, but before they go on, Nicole sneaks up on stage and scores a huge triumph singing "Last Dance". Frannie, after tricking Marv's dance partner into the locked stairway, enters the dance contest with Marv. Carl and Marv's dance partner hook up in the stairway. Jennifer and Ken share a romantic dance, as do Nicole and Bobby. Dave comes down and Sue ditches Tony. Tony's parked car, having taken innumerable hits from pretty much every other character's car, falls apart in the parking lot. Marv and Frannie win the big dance contest. Deciding that the Kiss concert is "kid stuff", Frannie and Jeannie, now self-proclaimed "disco queens", go with Marv to hit another disco for the 1:00 a.m. dance contest.

== Cast ==
- Jeff Goldblum as Tony Di Marco
- Donna Summer as Nicole Sims
- Debra Winger as Jennifer
- DeWayne Jessie as Malcolm Floyd
- Ray Vitte as Bobby Speed
- Valerie Landsburg as Frannie
- Terri Nunn as Jeannie
- Paul Jabara as Carl
- John Friedrich as Ken
- Mark Lonow as Dave
- Andrea Howard as Sue
- Marya Small as Jackie
- Robin Menken as Maddy
- Chick Vennera as Marvin "Marv" Gomez
- Chuck Sacci as Gus
- Hilary Beane as Shirley
- The Commodores as themselves

== Production ==
The film production occurred during the summer and autumn of 1977 at 333 S. La Cienega Boulevard (on the corner of La Cienga and San Vicente Boulevard) in Los Angeles. The building was formerly named the Millionaire's Club, which was closed several years before the film. Within these several years, the building underwent “a series of disco and restaurant attempts,” including one named Cabaret. It then was reopened as the nightclub Osko's in December 1977, several months after the filming. The club had four dance floors and 'the Cave', an ice cavern-themed room as seen in the film. Osko's was also a filming location of the 1978 horror film Jennifer. Club owner Osko Karaghossian had a role as a bouncer in the film. Osko's nightclub was completely demolished by the early 1990s and was replaced by a large Loehmann's dress store.

== Release ==
=== Critical response ===
On Rotten Tomatoes, the film has a 36% rating, based on 11 reviews, with an average rating of 4.7/10.

Roger Ebert rated the film 1.5 stars out of 4 and wrote, "When you describe it, it sounds like a lot more fun than it is when you see it." Gene Siskel of the Chicago Tribune gave the film an identical 1.5-star grade and called it "a disco movie that's little more than a dismal record promotion ... More attention has been paid to the display of records than people." Vincent Canby of The New York Times wrote that the film was "really a record album with live-action liner notes featuring a dozen young actors, most of whom are quite nice and, as yet, unknown, and a few who are better known but not as impressive as the new people." Canby remarked that Donna Summer, "whose wigs are as elaborate as Diana Ross's, is competition for the superb Miss Ross in no department other than hair." Arthur D. Murphy of Variety wrote, "Donna Summer makes her film debut in a comparatively charming role of an aspiring singer who cons her way to the disco stage and instant stardom. Fact that she is not known as an actress makes the thesping believable. Rest of cast, however, includes many with strong prior credits who are shot down by the Barry Armyran Bernstein script and Robert Klane's direction." Kevin Thomas of the Los Angeles Times described the film as a "lively, zany, often crass, sometimes irresponsible but surpassingly good-natured movie," with Summer possessing "an exciting screen presence", if not strong acting abilities. Gary Arnold of The Washington Post panned the film as "90 aimless, alienating minutes" full of "TV sitcom-pilot boors, half-wits and low-lifes" who "don't sustain a glimmer of human interest. When attention shifts back to one character or set of characters previously introduced, you have trouble placing them."

In his annual Movie Guide, film critic Leonard Maltin rated the film as a "BOMB". He wrote that it is "perhaps the worst film ever to have won some kind of Academy Award", for Summer's hit song "Last Dance".

=== Box office ===
The film opened in New York City on May 19, 1978 and grossed $752,000 from 85 theaters in its first week, which made it second for the week at the U.S. box office behind The Greek Tycoon.

=== Accolades ===
Award	Category	Song title	Recipient	Result	Ref.
Academy Awards	Best Original Song	"Last Dance"	Paul Jabara	Won	
Golden Globe Awards	Best Original Song	"Last Dance"	Paul Jabara	Won	
Grammy Awards	Best Rhythm & Blues Song	"Last Dance"	Paul Jabara	Won	
Grammy Awards	Best R&B Vocal Performance, Female	"Last Dance"	Donna Summer	Won	

The film is recognized by American Film Institute in these lists:

- 2004: AFI's 100 Years...100 Songs:
  - "Last Dance" – Nominated

=== Home media ===
Thank God It's Friday was released on Region 1 DVD on April 4, 2006, and released on Blu-ray on May 1, 2018, by Mill Creek Entertainment.

== Soundtrack ==
Thank God It's Friday

Soundtrack album by Various Artists
- Released: April 1978
- Recorded: 1975–1978
- Genre: Disco
- Length: 104:49; 106:12 (CD release)
- Labels: Casablanca Records (original release), Rebound Records, PolyGram, Universal Music

Singles from Thank God It's Friday
- 1. "Thank God It's Friday" Released: 1978; 2. "Last Dance" Released: July 2, 1978; 3. "Je t'aime... moi non plus" Released: July 17, 1978

Professional ratings
Review scores
Source	Rating
Allmusic	3/5 stars

The film contains many popular disco songs, with many key performers featured, including Donna Summer, Pattie Brooks, Love & Kisses, The Commodores. A triple album containing many of the tracks heard in the film was released six weeks in advance of the theatrical release to build up interest in the film.

Several songs heard in the film were not included on the soundtrack album, including an excerpt from Alec R. Costandinos' suite Romeo and Juilet, Giorgio Moroder's "From Here to Eternity", The Originals' "Down to Love Town", D.C. LaRue's "You Can Always Tell a Lady (By the Company She Keeps)", The Commodores' "Brick House", The 5th Dimension's "You Are The Reason (I Feel Like Dancing)", Meco's "Meco's Theme" and the Village People tracks, "In Hollywood (Everybody Is A Star)" and "I Am What I Am".

The biggest hit single on the album was Donna Summer's "Last Dance", which won an Academy Award as well as a Golden Globe for Best Original Song and also made it to #3 on the US singles chart. The song was written by Paul Jabara, who the following year composed Summer's duet with Barbra Streisand, "No More Tears (Enough Is Enough)". Jabara performed two of the songs on the Thank God It's Friday soundtrack and appeared in the film as well.

The soundtrack album was issued as a three-record set in 1978, of which the third disc was a single side 12 inch single of the 15:45 minutes Donna Summer, "Je t'aime... moi non plus" track. Upon its 1978 release, a promo set of separate 12" singles of every track was released to select DJs only. An edited CD came out in 1995 on the budget label Rebound Records. A digitally remastered version of the full soundtrack on a 2 disc set was released on PolyGram Records on March 25, 1997. The company that holds the rights to the album is as of 1998 the Universal Music Group. The album is described by many as the world's only five-sided soundtrack album.

Cameo's "Find My Way" was issued as a 7" single in 1975. Giorgio Moroder and Donna Summer's cover version of Serge Gainsbourg and Jane Birkin's 1969 hit single "Je t'aime... moi non plus" was recorded a few years earlier, but had its debut on the soundtrack and was issued as an edited 7" single in a few countries in 1978. "Too Hot ta Trot" was from The Commodores' 1977 album Commodores Live! – on certain editions of the Thank God It's Friday album replaced by a studio recording. The song topped Billboard's R & B chart the week of February 18, 1978. Other titles on the soundtrack, including "Last Dance", were recorded for the film.

Diana Ross' "Lovin' Livin' and Givin'" was remixed after the release of the soundtrack and used as the opening track on her 1978 album Ross. It was released as a single in certain territories and has since been remixed and re-edited a number of times for inclusion on various hits packages issued by Motown/Universal Music.

The final part of Donna Summer's "Last Dance" is later re-included as a separate track titled "Reprise" toward the end of the soundtrack album. An edited version of the whole track was the version issued on the 7" single in most countries, and this track can be found on many of Summer's compilations, including 1994's Endless Summer and 2003's The Journey: The Very Best of Donna Summer. The 12" single used the full-length 8:11 version. A live recording of the track was included on the album Live and More, issued in late 1978 and the following year the studio version was remixed by Giorgio Moroder for what was to be Summer's final Casablanca Records album On The Radio: Greatest Hits Volumes 1 & 2. The 1979 mix can be found on Summer's 1993 and 2005 compilations The Donna Summer Anthology and Gold respectively.

An extended remix of Summer's "With Your Love" was issued as a promo 12" single in 1978; a slightly shorter version of this can be found on the cd Mercury Records/PolyGram's 1987 release The Dance Collection: A Compilation of Twelve Inch Singles. The 8 track cartridge and cassette both feature the full length version.

=== Track listing ===
Side one

1. Love & Kisses: "Thank God It's Friday" (Alec R. Costandinos) – 4:13
  - Producer: Alec R. Costandinos
2. Pattie Brooks: "After Dark" (Simon Soussan/Sabrina Soussan) – 7:50
  - Producer: Simon Soussan
3. Donna Summer: "With Your Love" (Giorgio Moroder, Pete Bellotte, Donna Summer) – 3:58
  - Producers: Giorgio Moroder, Pete Bellotte
4. Donna Summer: "Last Dance" (Paul Jabara) – 8:11
  - Producers:Giorgio Moroder, Pete Bellotte

Side two

1. Paul Jabara: "Disco Queen" (Paul Jabara) – 3:45
  - Producers: Bob Esty, Paul Jabara
2. Cameo: "Find My Way" (Johnny Melfi) – 4:56
  - Producer: Larry Blackmon
3. The Commodores: "Too Hot ta Trot" (Lionel Richie, Milan Williams, Ronald LaPread, Thomas McClary, Walter "Clyde" Orange, William King) – 3:24
  - Producers: The Commodores, James Carmichael
4. Wright Bros. Flying Machine: "Leatherman's Theme" (Arthur G. Wright) – 3:22
  - Producer: Arthur G. Wright
5. Marathon: "I Wanna Dance" (Pete Bellotte, Thor Baldursson) – 5:58
  - Producer: Pete Bellotte

Side three

1. Sunshine: "Take It To the Zoo" (Bruce Sudano, Donna Summer, Joe Esposito) – 7:56
  - Producer: Arthur G. Wright
2. Santa Esmeralda: "Sevilla Nights" (Jean-Manuel de Scarano, Nicolas Skorsky, Jean-Claude Petit) – 6:05
  - Producers: Jean-Manuel de Scarano, Nicolas Skorsky
3. Love & Kisses: "You're the Most Precious Thing in My Life" (Alec R. Costandinos) – 8:02
  - Producer: Alec R. Constandinos

Side four

1. D.C. LaRue: "Do You Want the Real Thing" (D.C. LaRue, Bob Esty) – 4:40
  - Producer: Bob Esty
2. Paul Jabara: "Trapped in a Stairway" (Bob Esty, Paul Jabara) – 3:22
  - Producer: Paul Jabara, Bob Esty
3. Natural Juices: "Floyd's Theme" (Dick St. Nicklaus) – 2:57
  - Producer: Dick St. Nicklaus
4. Diana Ross: "Lovin', Livin' and Givin'" (Kenneth Stover, Pam Davis) – 3:17 (CD releases: – 4:40, remixed version)
  - Producer: Hal Davis
5. Thelma Houston: "Love Masterpiece" (Art Posey, Josef Powell) – 4:01
  - Producer: Hal Davis
6. Donna Summer "Last Dance" (Paul Jabara) (Reprise) – 3:17
  - Producers: Giorgio Moroder, Pete Bellotte

Side five

1. Donna Summer: "Je t'aime... moi non plus" (Serge Gainsbourg) – 15:45
  - Producers: Giorgio Moroder, Pete Bellotte

=== Charts ===
==== Weekly charts ====
Chart (1978)	Peak position
Australia (Kent Music Report)	21
Canada Top Albums/CDs (RPM)	9
Dutch Albums (Album Top 100)	32
German Albums (Offizielle Top 100)	34
New Zealand Albums (RMNZ)	3
Swedish Albums (Sverigetopplistan)	10
US Billboard 200	10
US R&B Albums (Billboard)	6
US Billboard Hot Dance Club Play	1

==== Year-end charts ====
Chart (1978)	Position
Canada Top Albums/CDs (RPM)	32
New Zealand Albums (RMNZ)	28
US Billboard 200	60

=== Certifications ===
Region	Certification	Certified units/sales
Canada (Music Canada)	Platinum	100,000^{^}
United States (RIAA)	Platinum	1,000,000^{^}
^{^} Shipments figures based on certification alone.

== See also ==
Other films released during the late 1970s disco and jukebox movie musical craze:

- Car Wash (1976)
- Saturday Night Fever (1977)
- Sgt. Pepper's Lonely Hearts Club Band (1978)
- Skatetown, U.S.A. (1979)
- Roller Boogie (1979)
- The Apple (1980)
- Xanadu (1980)
- Can't Stop the Music (1980)
- Fame (1980)
- Get Rollin' (1980), roller disco documentary
