= America (I Love America) =

Single by Full Intention
- Released: 1996
- Recorded: 1995
- Genre: House
- Label: Stress Records, Big Beat
- Songwriter(s): Patrick Pierre Juvet, Jacques Morali, Victor Edward Willis
- Producer(s): Rich Christina, Johnny de Mairo, Teddy Esposita, Aaron Smith

Full Intention singles chronology
"Full Length Disco Mixes Vol. 2" (1995)	"America (I Love America)" (1996)	"The Return of Full Intention" (1996)

"America (I Love America)" is the debut single by Full Intention. It contains a sample of Patrick Juvet's 1978 hit "I Love America" and was included on Anthems II 1991-2009, a composition by Ministry of Sound. On the U.S. dance chart, it spent two weeks at number one and a total of fourteen weeks on the chart in 1996.

== See also ==
- List of number-one dance singles of 1996 (U.S.)
