= My Way =

Song popularized by Frank Sinatra

- Side A of the original US single

Single by Frank Sinatra

from the album My Way
- B-side: "Blue Lace"
- Released: March 1969
- Recorded: December 30, 1968
- Studio: Western Studio A in Hollywood, Los Angeles
- Genre: Traditional pop
- Length: 4:35
- Label: Reprise
- Composer: Jacques Revaux
- Lyricists: Gilles Thibaut; Claude François; Paul Anka
- Producer: Sonny Burke

Frank Sinatra singles chronology
"Rain in My Heart" (1969)	"My Way" (1969)	"Love's Been Good to Me" (1969)

"My Way" is an English-language lyrical adaptation of the French song "Comme d'habitude", released by Frank Sinatra in 1969. The original song was written by Jacques Revaux, Gilles Thibaut, and Claude François, and was first recorded by the latter in 1967. The English-language lyrics were written by Paul Anka.

The song was a success for a variety of performers, including Sinatra, Elvis Presley, and Sid Vicious. Sinatra's version of "My Way" was a modest success in the United States and Canada, achieving peak positions of No. 27 and No. 26, respectively. It was far more successful in the United Kingdom, where it spent 75 weeks in the UK top 40 (the fifth-longest in UK chart history), reaching a top position of No. 5.

== Background ==
In 1967, Jacques Revaux wrote a ballad named "For Me", with English lyrics about a couple falling out of love. According to Revaux, the demo was then sent to Petula Clark, Dalida, and Claude François, to no avail. Revaux also rejected a version by Hervé Vilard and later reworked the song with François at the singer’s poolside in his Moulin de Dannemois estate. There, François reshaped the theme of the song around the emotional routine of a failing relationship, inspired by the end of his romance with France Gall.

François and Revaux revised the music together, while lyricist Gilles Thibaut helped François finalize the French lyrics. The song became “Comme d’habitude” (“As Usual”), which François recorded and released in November 1967. It was released in November 1967 and was at the top of the French pop chart for one week in February 1968.

In 1968, seeking to capitalize on the song's European success, music publisher David Pitt asked a young David Bowie, then working as a for-hire songwriter, to adapt the lyrics of "Comme d'habitude" into English for release in English-speaking markets. Bowie wrote and recorded a demo version of his interpretation, "Even a Fool Learns to Love". However, the song was not formally recorded, and the project was shelved. (Bowie later developed his idea into a wholly original song, "Life on Mars?", which became a hit single for him and one of his signature songs.)

Paul Anka heard the French original while on vacation in the south of France. He flew to Paris to negotiate the rights to the song. He acquired adaptation, recording, and publishing rights for the nominal, but formal, consideration of one dollar, subject to the provision that the three songwriters would retain their original share of royalty rights with respect to whatever versions Anka or his designates created or produced. Sometime later, Anka had a dinner in Florida with Frank Sinatra and "a couple of Mob guys" during which Sinatra said: "I'm quitting the business. I'm sick of it; I'm getting the hell out."

Back in New York, Anka re-wrote the original French song for Sinatra, subtly altering the melodic structure and changing the lyrical theme:

At one o'clock in the morning, I sat down at an old IBM electric typewriter and said, 'If Frank were writing this, what would he say?' And I started, metaphorically, 'And now the end is near.' I read a lot of periodicals, and I noticed everything was 'my this' and 'my that'. We were in the 'me generation' and Frank became the guy for me to use to say that. I used words I would never use: 'I ate it up and spit it out.' But that's the way he talked. I used to be around steam rooms with the Rat Pack guys—they liked to talk like Mob guys, even though they would have been scared of their own shadows.

Anka finished the song at 5 in the morning: "I called Frank up in Nevada—he was at Caesars Palace – and said, 'I've got something really special for you.'" Anka asserted: "When my record company caught wind of it, they were very pissed that I didn't keep it for myself. I said, 'Hey, I can write it, but I'm not the guy to sing it.' It was for Frank, no one else."

On December 30, 1968, Sinatra recorded his version of the song in one take, featuring session drummer Buddy Saltzman among the band. "My Way" was released in early 1969 on the My Way LP and as a single. It reached No. 27 on the Billboard Hot 100 chart and No. 2 on the Easy Listening chart in the US. In the UK, the single achieved a still unmatched record, becoming the recording with the most weeks inside the top 40, spending 75 weeks from April 1969 to September 1971. It spent a further 47 weeks in the top 75 but never bettered the No. 5 slot achieved upon its first chart run.

Billboard said that the "driving, lush and commercial Don Costa arrangement and production is an added plus to one of Sinatra's finest performances." Cash Box said that "The powerful material is matched by a splendidly moving performance which is certain to win rave comments from programmers with teen and adult audiences."

Although this work became Sinatra's signature song, his daughter Tina has said the singer came to hate the song: "He didn't like it. That song stuck and he couldn't get it off his shoe." "He always thought that song was self-serving and self-indulgent."

In 2000, the 1969 release of "My Way" by Sinatra on Reprise Records was inducted into the Grammy Hall of Fame.

Despite asserting that he never intended to sing the song himself, Anka recorded "My Way" in 1969 on The John Davidson Show, shortly after Sinatra's recording was released. Anka recorded it four other times as well: in 1996 (as a duet with Gabriel Byrne, performed in the film Mad Dog Time); in 1998 in Spanish as "A mi manera" (duet with Julio Iglesias); in 2007 (as a duet with Jon Bon Jovi, having with his band Bon Jovi earlier referenced Sinatra's recording in their 2000 hit "It's My Life"); and in 2013 (as a duet with Garou). In addition, François himself later recorded "My Way" on his 1977 English album Claude François en Anglais.

In June 2026, CBS News included the song in its list of the 250 essential American songs of the past 250 years.

== Charts ==
Chart (1969)	Peak position
Canada RPM Top Singles	26
Canada RPM Easy Listening	2
Ireland (IRMA)	4
UK Singles (Official Charts)	5
US Billboard Hot 100	27
US Billboard Easy Listening	2
US Cash Box Top 100	29

2021–2026 weekly chart performance for "My Way"
Chart (2021–2026)	Peak position
Hungary (Single Top 40)	40
Israel International Airplay (Media Forest)	13

== Certifications ==
Region	Certification	Certified units/sales
Denmark (IFPI Danmark)	Gold	45,000^{‡}
Germany (BVMI)	Gold	250,000^{‡}
Italy (FIMI)	Platinum	100,000^{‡}
New Zealand (RMNZ)	Platinum	30,000^{‡}
Spain (Promusicae)	Gold	30,000^{‡}
United Kingdom (BPI)	Platinum	991,563
^{‡} Sales+streaming figures based on certification alone.

== Versions ==
David Bowie wrote the first English-language lyrics to Claude François' original song, though the lyrics and performance were only informally recorded and never commercially published. The version by Brook Benton reached number 49 in Canada in May 1970.

=== Dorothy Squires ===
In the midst of Sinatra's multiple runs on the UK Singles Chart, Welsh singer Dorothy Squires also released a rendition of "My Way" in summer 1970. Her recording reached number 25 on the UK Singles Chart and re-entered the chart twice more during that year.

=== Elvis Presley ===
"My Way"

Single by Elvis Presley

from the album Elvis in Concert
- B-side: "America"
- Released: October 3, 1977
- Recorded: June 21, 1977
- Genre: Pop, country
- Length: 3:51
- Label: RCA
- Composer: Jacques Revaux
- Lyricists: Gilles Thibaut; Claude François; Paul Anka

Elvis Presley singles chronology
"Way Down" (1977)	"My Way" (1977)	"Unchained Melody" (1978)

Elvis Presley began performing the song in concert during the mid-1970s, despite Anka's suggestions that the song did not suit him. Nevertheless, on January 12 and 14, 1973, Presley sang the song during his satellite show Aloha from Hawaii via Satellite, beamed live and on deferred basis (for European audiences, who also saw it in prime time), to 43 countries via Intelsat.

On October 3, 1977, several weeks after Presley's death, his live recording of "My Way" (recorded for the Elvis in Concert CBS-TV special on June 21, 1977) was released as a single. In the U.S., it reached number 22 on the Billboard Hot 100 pop singles chart in late 1977/early 1978 (higher than Frank Sinatra's peak position), number 6 on the Billboard Adult Contemporary chart, and went gold for its successful sales of over a million copies. The following year the single reached number 2 on the Billboard Country singles chart but went all the way to number 1 on the rival Cash Box Country Singles chart. In the UK, it reached number 9 on the UK Singles Chart.

Presley's version is featured in the climax of the 2001 film 3000 Miles to Graceland (Paul Anka appears in a cameo as a casino pit boss who loathes Presley).

Presley's studio version of the song, recorded in 1971, was included on the fourth disc of Walk a Mile in My Shoes: The Essential '70s Masters.

==== Certifications ====
Region	Certification	Certified units/sales
Canada (Music Canada)	Platinum	200,000
United Kingdom (BPI)	Silver	250,000^{^}
United States (RIAA)	Gold	1,000,000^{^}
^{^} Shipments figures based on certification alone.

=== Sid Vicious ===
"My Way"

Single by Sid Vicious / Sex Pistols

from the album The Great Rock 'n' Roll Swindle
- A-side: "No One Is Innocent"
- Released: June 30, 1978
- Recorded: April 10, 1978
- Genre: Punk rock; new wave
- Length: 4:06
- Label: Virgin
- Composer: Jacques Revaux
- Lyricists: Gilles Thibaut; Claude François; Paul Anka
- Producers: Bill Price; Simon Jeffes

Sex Pistols bassist Sid Vicious did a punk rock and new wave version of the song, in which a large body of the words were changed and the arrangement was sped up. The orchestral backing was arranged by Simon Jeffes.

Interviewed in 2007, Paul Anka said he had been "somewhat destabilized by the Sex Pistols' version. It was kind of curious, but I felt he [Sid Vicious] was sincere about it."

For the recording, which took place on April 10, 1978 with the rhythm section consisting of members of the French bands Magma and Voyage, Vicious and his girlfriend, Nancy Spungen, changed many of the words when it was recorded, including use of the swear words "cunt" and "fuck" as well as the word "queer" (slang for a gay man). Vicious's reference to a "prat who wears hats" was an in-joke directed towards Vicious's friend and Sex Pistols bandmate Johnny Rotten, who was fond of wearing different kinds of hats he would pick up at jumble sales. It is a rare example of a UK Top 10 hit that contains the word "cunt". Although other members of the band did not contribute to the initial track, guitarist Steve Jones later overdubbed lead guitar parts onto the song.

Leonard Cohen said of the song:

I never liked this song except when Sid Vicious did it. Sung straight, it somehow deprives the appetite of a certain taste we'd like to have on our lips. When Sid Vicious did it, he provided that other side to the song; the certainty, the self-congratulation, the daily heroism of Sinatra's version is completely exploded by this desperate, mad, humorous voice. I can't go round in a raincoat and fedora looking over my life saying I did it my way – well, for 10 minutes in some American bar over a gin and tonic you might be able to get away with it. But Sid Vicious's rendition takes in everybody; everybody is messed up like that, everybody is the mad hero of his own drama. It explodes the whole culture this self-presentation can take place in, so it completes the song for me.

The 1986 film Sid and Nancy features a scene where Gary Oldman, portraying Vicious, performs his version of "My Way" while filming the song's music video.

Vicious' version of this song appears in Martin Scorsese's 1990 film Goodfellas, where it plays over the end credits.

Personnel

- Sid Vicious – vocal
- Steve Jones – lead guitar
- Claude Engel – rhythm guitar, lead guitar (intro)
- Sauveur Mallia – bass guitar
- Pierre-Alain Dahan – drums
- Simon Jeffes – string arrangements

=== Margaret Mackie and Jamie Lee Morley ===
In December 2019 footage of Margaret Mackie, a resident of Northcare Suites Care Home in Edinburgh who has dementia, performing "My Way" with staff member Jamie Lee Morley, went viral after being posted online by Mackie's daughter.

Morley later arranged to have the song professionally recorded and it was released in January 2020 as a charity single to raise funds for Alzheimer's Society and Dementia UK. The single peaked at number four in the iTunes top 40 UK Pop Songs live chart and number two in the Amazon best seller chart.

=== Yūzō Kayama ===
In Japan, Yūzō Kayama, who is usually called the Japanese Frank Sinatra, performed "My Way" in 2008 in English. On April 23 and 30, 2015, as part of 2 vocal overdubbed sessions, Yūzō Kayama performed "My Way" with the earlier record of Frank Sinatra as a duet.

== Public use ==
The song is popularly associated with nostalgia. Surveys beginning in 2005 have often reported that "My Way" has been the song most frequently played at funeral services in the UK until 2014 when it was replaced as the top choice by Always Look on the Bright Side of Life by Eric Idle. In her memoir Walk Through Walls, Marina Abramović expressed her desire for Nina Simone's version of "My Way" to be performed by Anohni at her funeral.

"My Way" is also a popular karaoke song around the world. However, it has been reported to cause numerous incidents of violence and homicide among karaoke singers in the Philippines, referred to in the media as the "My Way" killings, which has led to the song being banned in many Filipino bars.

The song's association with Sinatra led to Mikhail Gorbachev's policy of allowing other states in the Warsaw Pact to make their own policy decisions being nicknamed the Sinatra Doctrine, referencing the lyrics about doing things one's own way. The term was first used by Foreign Ministry spokesman Gennadi Gerasimov in 1987, who was quoted as saying "We now have the Frank Sinatra doctrine. He has a song, I Did It My Way. So every country decides on its own which road to take."

The song was played over the public address system at Yankee Stadium after Derek Jeter ended his last home game with a walkoff RBI single on September 25, 2014.

In 2024, the song was played at Alexei Navalny's funeral. French singer Yseult sang it at the end of the 2024 Summer Olympics Closing Ceremony at Stade de France in Paris.

Australian politician Bill Shorten referenced the song in relation to his role in the deposition of former Labor prime ministers Kevin Rudd and Julia Gillard in a speech to announce that he was retiring from politics.
