= Romeo and Juliet (album) =

Romeo & Juliet

Studio album by Alec R. Costandinos and the Syncophonic Orchestra
- Released: 1978
- Recorded: Trident Studios, London, September 1977
- Genres: Disco; funk; Euro disco
- Length: 32:08
- Labels: Ibis, Casablanca

Alec R. Costandinos and the Syncophonic Orchestra chronology
Love and Kisses (as Love and Kisses) (1977)	Romeo & Juliet (1978)	The Hunchback of Notre Dame (as Alec R. Constandinos) (1978)

Romeo & Juliet is the first studio album by the disco musician Alec R. Costandinos and the Syncophonic Orchestra released in 1978. It was recorded at Trident Studios, London, in September 1977 and released by Ibis in France and Casablanca Records in the US.

The album consists of one over 30-minute long disco suite composed of five acts, including various instruments and genres. It included famous collaborators such as Don Ray, Herbie Flowers, Peter Van Hooke, Alan Hawkshaw, Chris Karan, Frank Ricotti and the photographer Ron Slenzak. One fragment was released as a "Romeo and Juliet" single and reached the top of US Hot Dance Club Play chart in March 1978. The album was called "conceptual masterpiece" by the AllMusic reviewer Jason Birchmeier, who gave it 4.5 out of 5 stars.

== Track listing ==
No.	Title	Length
1.	"Romeo & Juliet (Acts I et II)"	15:17
2.	"Romeo & Juliet (Acts III, IV et V)"	16:51

== Personnel ==
Adapted from:

- Arrangement – Don Ray
- Art direction, design – Gribbitt!, Henry Vizcarra, Phyllis Chotin
- Bass – Herbie Flowers
- Brass – John Watson's Brass Section
- Drums – Peter Van Hooke
- Engineering – Peter R. Kelsey
- Guitar – Chris Rae, Rick Hitchcock, Slim Pezin
- Keyboards – Alan Hawkshaw, Alec R. Costandinos, Raymond Donnez
- Percussion – Chris Karan, Frank Ricotti, John Dean
- Performer – The Birds Of Paris
- Photography – Ron Slenzak
- Producing, composing – Alec R. Costandinos
- Programming of synthesizers – George Rodi
- Strings – The Pat Halling String Ensemble
- Tape Operator – Collin Green, Peter Kamlish, Reno Ruocco
- Technician – Stephen Short
