= We'll Find Our Day =

Single by Stephanie De-Sykes

from the album Stephanie De-Sykes
- B-side: "It's Been a Long, Long Day"
- Released: 1975
- Genre: Pop
- Label: Bradley's Records
- Songwriter(s): Roger Holman; Simon May
- Producer(s): Barry Leng

Stephanie De-Sykes singles chronology
"Born with a Smile on My Face" (1974)	"We'll Find Our Day" (1975)

"We'll Find Our Day" is a popular song written by Roger Holman and Simon May. It was recorded by Stephanie De-Sykes for her self-titled 1975 album. The single peaked at number 17 in the United Kingdom.

== Charts ==
Chart (1975)	Peak position
UK Singles Chart	17
