= Brays Grove Community School =

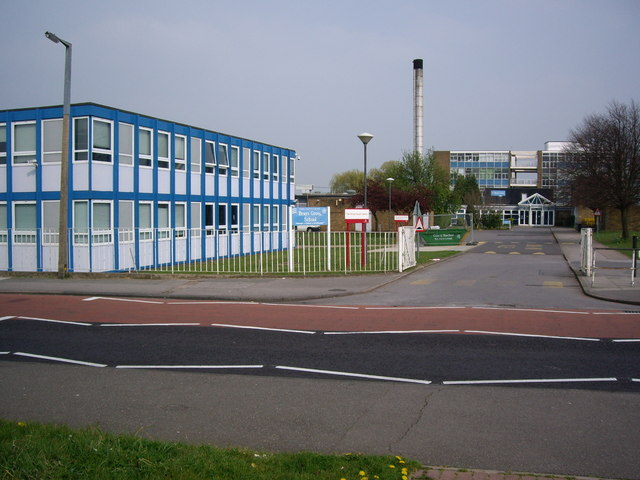
- The former school site

Location
- Tracyes Road; Harlow; Essex, CM18 6JH; England
- Coordinates: 51.757580°N 0.123410°E

Information
- Type: Community school
- Closed: 2008
- Local authority: Essex
- Department for Education URN: 115217 Tables
- Ofsted: Reports
- Gender: Mixed
- Age: 11 to 16

Brays Grove Community School was a mixed secondary school located within the town of Harlow in Essex, England.

The school was closed in 2008 due to falling pupil numbers in the town. The site was subsequently demolished and a rebuilt Passmores Academy occupied the site from 2012.

== Notable former pupils ==
- Stephanie de Sykes, singer
