= I Found Love (Now That I Found You) =

Single by Love & Kisses

from the album Love & Kisses
- B-side: "Accidental Lover"
- Released: 1977
- Recorded: 1977
- Genre: Disco
- Length: 5:15
- Label: Casablanca
- Songwriter(s): Alec R. Costandinos
- Producer(s): Alec R. Costandinos

Love & Kisses singles chronology
"I Found Love (Now That I Found You)" (1977)	"Thank God It's Friday" (1978)

"I Found Love (Now That I Found You)" is a song by Love & Kisses, a studio group formed by Cairo-born French musician Alec R. Costandinos. Along with the song "Accidental Lover", "I Found Love (Now That I Found You)", from the group's 1977 self-titled debut studio album, hit number one on the US Hot Disco Singles chart for three weeks in July 1977. The song, written and produced by Costandinos, can be found on the compilation CD Disco Nights Vol. 3: The Best of Euro Disco. A brief snippet of this song is used in "The Diva Megamix", which is on Pure Disco 2.
