= The Birds of Paris =

The Birds of Paris are a group of (mostly) disco backing vocalists, who worked for the main part with Alec R. Costandinos and on some of his side projects like Sphinx and Sumeria. They also worked with Cerrone. A few of these singers later had successful careers of their own (Sue and Sunny, Katie Kissoon, Madeline Bell, Stephanie de Sykes and Vicki Brown). The group also included Joanne Stone, Kay Garner and Steve Short.
