= Born with a Smile on My Face =

Single by Stephanie De Sykes with Rain

from the album Rain featuring Stephanie De-Sykes
- B-side: "Woman's Intuition"
- Released: 1974
- Genre: Pop
- Length: 3:15
- Label: Bradley's Records
- Songwriter(s): Roger Holman; Simon May
- Producer(s): Barry Leng

Stephanie De Sykes with Rain singles chronology
"Born with a Smile on My Face" (1974)	"We'll Find Our Day" (1975)

"Born with a Smile on My Face" is a popular song written by Roger Holman and Simon May. Included as the first track on the 1974 album Rain Featuring Stephanie De-Sykes, the single peaked at number two in the United Kingdom and number 19 in Australia.

== Charts ==
Chart (1974)	Peak position
Australia ARIA Charts	19
Belgium (Ultratop 50 Flanders)	23
UK Singles Chart	2
