= Roger Holman =

British musician and composer (born 1948)

- Born: Roger Holman; 4 July 1948 (age 78); Exeter
- Died: Warminster
- Genre: All types
- Occupation: Songwriter
- Instruments: Violin, guitar, bass guitar, keyboards, percussion.
- Years active: 1965–2024
- Website: www.florencethemusical.com

Roger Holman is a British musician and composer. He is best known for the televised musical Smike and as the co-writer of Stephanie De Sykes's two hit singles.

As a performer, Holman released a 1971 self-produced single with two songs, "Act Like a Man" and "Back On My Feet", both co-written with his writing partner Simon May. The Holman/May duo released a 45 record the following year using the stage name "Sqeek". In 1973, Holman collaborated with Simon May and Clive Barnett to create the musical Smike, which was televised on the BBC. Holman also co-wrote with May the UK top-20 hits for Stephanie De Sykes "Born with a Smile on My Face", which peaked at number two in 1974, and "We'll Find Our Day", which peaked at number 17 in 1975. In 1975, Holman released another solo effort on EMI Records, performing the songs "Laugh, Laugh, Laugh" and "Lay Your Head in the Grass".

In 2011, Holman wrote a musical adaptation of Thomas Hardy's Far from the Madding Crowd.

== Early life ==
Roger Holman was born on 4 July 1948 in Exeter, Devon. Both of his parents were teachers. His father, Peter Thomas Holman, was an accredited pianist and organist, a Licentiate of Trinity College London, and an organist at Exeter Cathedral. His mother, Charlotte Jervaise (née Downing), was a pianist and a lifelong organist and choir mistress.

Roger Holman was a pupil at Dauntsey's School in Wiltshire, where he formed a pop band with Simon May (the composer of BBC TV’s EastEnders and Howard’s Way themes) and three other pupils. Holman and May were to form a songwriting partnership that was to last for over a decade.

== Professional career ==
=== Photography ===
On leaving school, Holman embarked on a photographic course at Salisbury College of Photography, followed by three years working as a photographer for a public relations company in London’s Park Lane. Clients he worked for included Carreras Cigarettes, the Scotch Whisky Association, Kellogg's, Optilon Zips, the Arab League, and Chevron.

=== Songwriting and composer ===
During his time as a photographer that Holman and May, who shared a house in Kingston upon Thames, Surrey, wrote and recorded songs under the name of Simon, Plug and Grimes ("Way In, Way Out", "Don’t Push Me", "Pull Together" on the President label, as well as "Is This A Dream" for Deram Records). They also wrote the song "Pukwudgie" which was a minor hit for the comedian Charlie Drake in 1972. As a result of this, the pair were signed to ATV Music, based at the time in London's Bruton Street. ATV Music's list of songwriters included Lynsey De Paul, Barry Blue, Ron Roker, and Tony Hiller, while administering of others, including John Lennon, Paul McCartney, and Neil Sedaka.

Between 1971 and 1975, while under contract to ATV Music, Holman and May composed pieces in a variety of genres for the ATV Network and BBC TV. One of the most successful was "Clock In", used by the ITV network as a minute-long link between schools' programmes, four or five times a day on weekdays during school terms. It was the biggest PRS earner in the UK for the entire year in which it ran.

For most of their time with ATV, Simon May remained in the position of Head of Modern Languages at Kingston Grammar School, Surrey, where he and history teacher Clive Barnett wrote a musical, Smike, as a pupil end-of-term production, which premiered at Surbiton Assembly Rooms, Surrey, in June 1973. Holman was booked to play in the musical's band, was at time unable to fly to BBC Scotland in Glasgow to record the theme song to a new BBC1 TV series called Crazy Bus, starring the comedians Hope and Keen, Peter Goodwright, and Ruth Kettlewell. Smike was scheduled in a shorter hour-long version for transmission on BBC2 on Christmas Sunday, 1973. The TV production starred Beryl Reid as Mrs. Squeers, Andrew Keir as Mr. Squeers, Leonard Whiting as Nicholas, Christine McKenna (best known for her starring role as Christina in 13 episodes of Flambards in 1979), and Ivan Sharrock (who played "Jackie Merrick" for nine years from 1980 in Emmerdale) as Smike. The original cast also featured Neil Fox, a pupil at Kingston Grammar at the time, as one of the schoolboys. The musical was repeated as Show Of The Week on BBC2 in April 1974 and repeated for a third time on BBC1 TV on Christmas Sunday 1974. Since then, the musical has been performed over 5,000 times in schools and by amateur groups worldwide. Two songs from the musical became hits in the UK: "We’ll Find Our Day", sung by Stephanie De Sykes, and "Don’t Let Life Get You Down", by former Four Pennies lead singer Lionel Morton.

Holman's song "Born With A Smile On My Face" (a song written for and rejected by Jimmy Tarbuck), was recorded by Stephanie de Sykes at the ATV studios in Birmingham, and achieved number two in the official BBC charts. Other songs, written by Holman and covered by artists, included "Grin And Bare It" by Barbara Windsor; "Suzie" by Guy Darrell; "Someone Like You" sung by Tails; "Tennis, Cricket Or Gin" by Derek Nimmo; "Thinking Of You This Christmas" by Clive Dunn; "Do What You Wanna Do" by The Pioneers (album track); and "The Dancer" by Bacchus (instrumental). Holman/May composed television advertisements for Air Jamaica and the UK teen mag Look In. Holman left ATV Music in 1976 and was contracted to Chappells Music, where he arranged and produced the Warwick Records TV-promoted album The Magic of Rodgers and Hammerstein, featuring soprano Lorna Dallas and cabaret artist Barry Kent. He also arranged and produced all music included on the Ronco TV-promoted album The Encyclopaedia Of Children's Stories & Nursery Rhymes.

=== Music publishing ===
After being signed to Southern Music, Holman and the late Slim Miller formed the independent music publishing company Striped Music, based in London’s South Audley Street, with funding from its parent company, Tiger Securities. Striped Music produced the 1980 hit "You’ve Got To Be A Hustler If You Want To Get On", sung and composed by the late Sue Wilkinson.

Following this Holman composed four musicals: Florence, based on part of the life of Florence Nightingale with a book by drama director Terrence Samuel; Far From The Madding Crowd – The Musical, an adaptation of Hardy’s novel; Bojo Bungalo, a spoof sci-fi musical children and adults; and The Singer And The Songwriter, an adult musical play that premiered at the Wharf Theatre, Devizes in 1989.

=== Theatre management ===
After a short time at West End Centre, Aldershot, Holman became the artistic director of the Athenaeum Theatre in Warminster, bringing artists such as Sir John Mills, Wendy Craig, Lindisfarne, the Chris Barber Jazz Band, Alan Price, and comedians George Melly, Sue Perkins, and Jeremy Hardy.

=== Murder mystery productions ===
For seventeen years from 1977, Holman and his second wife, Lynn, created and promoted The Touring Murder Mystery Dinner Actors' Company, that performed a variety of humorous murder mystery plays to over 80,000 people in over a thousand performances whilst they were dining in hotels, restaurants, golf clubs, military wardrooms, and officers' messes throughout the west and southern England, the West Midlands, London, and South Wales, and even during special events cruising up and down the Thames at Windsor.

== Personal life ==
Roger Holman has been married twice, firstly to Amanda, in 1973, the marriage producing two children; they were divorced in 1980. He had lived with his second wife, Lynn, for twenty-six years, before they married in 2015; they have two children.

== Discography ==
Year	Album	Record label	Notes
1971	Act Like a Man / Back On My Feet (single)	Trojan Records (10 783 AT)	Roger Holman (solo)
1972	Make Hay While the Sun Shines / L'Amour D'Un Apres-Midi (single)	Bronze Records (BRO 1)	Squeek (Roger Holman and Simon May)
1973	Smike!	Pye Records (NSPL 18423)	Roger Holman & Simon May
1973	Smike: Kingston Grammar School	KGS Records (KGS 101)	Roger Holman
1975	Laugh, Laugh, Laugh / Lay Your Head in the Grass (single)	EMI Records (EMI 2309)	Roger Holman
1981	Smike: A Musical by Simon May and Roger Holman	Look Records (LK/LP 6703)	Simon May / Roger Holman, Ashville College Dramatic Society
