= My Way killings =

Social phenomenon in the Philippines

The "My Way" killings were a social phenomenon in the Philippines, involving a number of fatal disputes that arose from the singing of the song "My Way", popularized by Frank Sinatra, in karaoke bars (more commonly known as "videoke" in the Philippines). A New York Times article estimated the number of killings to be at least six as of 2010. Between 2002 and 2012, numerous people were killed for singing the song.

Explanations for these incidents differ, from the song simply being a popular choice in the nation's karaoke bars, where violence is common, to perceived aggression in the lyrics of the song.

== Background and history ==
Karaoke singing is a widespread, popular pastime in the Philippines. Many were earning about US$2 (₱92.3) a day in 2007 and could purchase time on a "videoke" machine at a rate of US$0.11 (₱5) per song. Filipinos who can afford to do so often get private rooms at karaoke bars.

Since January 16, 1998, about a dozen incidents occurred in connection with strenuous complaints over the singing of the song "My Way", prompting Filipino newspapers to name the phenomenon the "'My Way' killings".

Attention to these killings in response peaked on May 29, 2007, when 29-year-old Romy Baligula was shot dead by bouncer guard Robilito Ortega at a bar in San Mateo, Rizal. The bouncer had stated that he was prompted to kill Romy using his service weapon, a .38 caliber pistol, when Romy accidentally went off key while singing "My Way" and struggled to get back on track.

The phenomenon continued in the 2010s and gained much more attention when the chairman of a barangay in Tondo, Manila, was shot alongside his aide/driver by motorcycle-riding gunmen, while singing the song during a Christmas party; the chairman died on the spot while the aide survived in critical condition. In leads to the case, authorities suspect the motive to be allegations of the chairman being a protector of drug peddlers and small-time kingpins, which residents of the barangay as well as the chairman's friends, acquaintances, and relatives vehemently denied, believing the crime to be politically motivated.

The last known incident was in June 2018, when 61-year-old Jose Bosmion Jr. was stabbed to death by his neighbor, 28-year-old Rolando Cañeso, during a birthday party in Dipolog. Bosmion grabbed the microphone from Cañeso right as he was about to sing the song, leading to a fist fight that turned into a stabbing.

== Responses ==
Some Filipinos—even those who love the song—will not sing it in public, in order to avoid trouble or out of superstitious fear.

As of 2007, the song reportedly had been taken off the playlists of karaoke machines in many bars in Manila, Bangkok, and Tokyo, after complaints about out-of-tune renditions of the song, resulting in verbal harassment, violent fights, and murder.

As a reference to the phenomenon, Japanese rock band Kishidan released an uptempo rock cover of "My Way" as their 10th anniversary single, with a promotional music video featuring lead singer Ayanocozey Show being shot numerous times while singing the song. Ayanocozey is then shot once more in the back while walking away after the song is concluded, collapsing in a heap on the stairs with a wry grin. A shortened version was used as a commercial.

== Explanations ==
New York Times writer Norimitsu Onishi argued that the killings might be "the natural byproduct of the country's culture of violence, drinking and machismo". Violent attacks occur frequently in Philippine karaoke bars, with fights often sparked over breaches of karaoke etiquette – such as laughing at other performers, performing the same song twice, or hogging the microphone.

According to Roland B. Tolentino, an expert in pop culture at the University of the Philippines Diliman, the killings connected to singing the song in karaoke may simply reflect its popularity in a violent environment. He also noted that the song's "triumphalist" theme might have an aggravating effect on singers and listeners alike. Other tunes, just as popular in the Philippines, have not resulted in murder.

Butch Albarracin, the owner of "Center for Pop", a Manila-based singing school, also believes the lyrics of "My Way" increase the violence. The lyrics, as he explained, "evoke feelings of pride and arrogance in the singer, as if you're somebody when you're really nobody. It covers up your failures. That's why it leads to fights."

Eric Alterman, CUNY distinguished professor in English and journalism, wrote a critique of Onishi's article. He observed that the article did not provide any evidence - witness or police reports - to back up the story. Alterman says that this is the issue with journalism: "You can make up as much stuff as you want as long as nobody in power has a reason to object."

== "Karaoke rage" in other countries ==
Cases of karaoke rage, where singers have been harassed, assaulted or killed mid-performance have been reported all over the world.

- In August 2007, a karaoke singer in Seattle, Washington, was attacked by a woman who wanted him to stop singing Coldplay's "Yellow".
- In March 2008, a man was arrested in Thailand for shooting eight people to death, including his brother-in-law, in a dispute stemming from several karaoke offerings, including repeated renditions of John Denver's "Take Me Home, Country Roads".
- In December 2008, a man at a Malaysian coffee shop hogged the karaoke microphone for so long he was stabbed to death by other patrons.
- In August 2012, a fight over the microphone broke out in a Chinese karaoke parlor, with a man killing two relatives with a meat cleaver.
- In July 2013, an American was stabbed to death for refusing to stop singing in a karaoke bar in Krabi, Thailand.
- In March 2022, American actor Ezra Miller was arrested and charged with disorderly conduct and harassment after getting into altercations with attendees of a karaoke bar in Hawaii. Miller was at a karaoke bar when they suddenly began "yelling obscenities and became agitated when people began singing karaoke". Miller allegedly lunged at a man who was playing darts and grabbed a microphone out of a woman's hand as she was mid-song.
