= Stephanie De Sykes =

English singer and actress (born 1948)

- Born: Stephanie Ryton; 1948 (age 77–78); England
- Genre: Pop
- Occupation: Singer
- Label: Bradleys Records

Stephanie De Sykes (née Ryton; born 1948) is an English singer and actress.

== Early life ==
She attended Brays Grove School in Harlow, Essex; she returned to the school for a final reunion in June 2008 as guest of honour.

== Career ==
=== Solo singer ===
De Sykes began her career as a session singer, often releasing tracks under other names. Her first release in 1972 was "Bright Shines The Light" on the Polydor label, credited as 'Verity'. She had her first hit in 1974 with the Roger Holman/Simon May penned "Born with a Smile on My Face" which reached number two in the UK Singles Chart. It also reached number 19 in Australia. The song featured in the ATV British TV serial "Crossroads", in which De Sykes played a character called Holly Brown in a 1975 episode. She also recorded the theme tune to the television programme The Golden Shot with the group Rain that same year. The theme song, "Golden Day", was written for them by Lynsey de Paul and Barry Blue.

Around this time, the television company ATV Midlands started each day's broadcasting with a short film accompanied by another song performed by Rain with De Sykes singing vocals, "Odyssey" (often incorrectly referred to as "Life is a Beautiful Book"). After playing a pop singer in the Crossroads episode, De Sykes returned to the UK Top 20 as a solo artist with the song "We'll Find Our Day", a song she performed in the Crossroads episode at Meg Mortimer's wedding, where she appeared as singer 'Holly Brown'. She also had a starring role in the comedy Side by Side. In 1977, she sang "Cool Wind from the North", in Episode 1 of the Marc Bolan TV show, Marc.

=== Groups and backing singer ===
De Sykes was one of The Birds of Paris, a combination of backing singers used throughout the 1970s to add vocals to a number of disco groups and artists. The other members of the Birds of Paris included Madeline Bell, Joanne Stone, Kay Garner, Sunny Leslie, Sue Glover, Vicki Brown and Katie Kissoon.

She was once a background vocalist of Love & Kisses, a concept group by producer Alec R. Costandinos. She also sang with the group "Sphinx" and with Voyage.

=== De Sykes / Slater ===
De Sykes and Stuart Slater wrote two UK Eurovision Song Contest entries, Co-Co's "The Bad Old Days" and Prima Donna's "Love Enough for Two" in 1978 and 1980 respectively. De Sykes and Slater had one other song in the UK final, "All Around The World" in 1983, which was performed by Slater, ostensibly as a soloist, but with five musicians, including De Sykes on keyboards and vocals. The song placed fifth of the eight submissions.

=== Later career ===
Her 1979 self-penned single release "Oh, What A Night For Romance" was featured on the BBC1 show Juke Box Jury, when it was panned by the panel of Dusty Springfield, Tony Blackburn, Jonathan King and Britt Ekland who unanimously correctly predicted it would be a 'miss'. De Sykes featured in a TV commercial for McVities biscuits in the 1983 Christmas period and soon after provided background vocals for Meat Loaf's 1984 album Bad Attitude, which included the Jim Steinman penned single, "Nowhere Fast".

As a human rights activist, her 2015 song "Bomb Babies" was chosen as the opening track for the pro-peace anti-war album Not In Our Name, a collaboration of singers and musicians, songwriters and poets.

== Personal life ==
De Sykes lived with Stuart Slater (born Stuart Leslie James Slater, 14 July 1945, Liverpool), lead singer of The Mojos, with whom she had two sons: musician Toby Slater; and Barnaby Slater, a comedian, writer and producer.

She was then in a relationship with the comedian and broadcaster Angus Deayton, and was credited with some of the female vocals on the 1985 second album of his parody band, The Hee Bee Gee Bees. Their relationship broke up in the early 1990s, after he began an affair with scriptwriter Lise Mayer in 1991.

== See also ==
- List of Eurovision: Your Decision contestants
- List of performers on Top of the Pops
