= Où sont les femmes? =

1977 single by Patrick Juvet

Single by Patrick Juvet

from the album Paris by Night
- Released: July 1977
- Recorded: 1977
- Studio: Devonshire Sound Studios, Los Angeles
- Genre: Disco
- Length: 6:15 (album version); 4:13 (single version)
- Label: Barclay
- Songwriters: Jean-Michel Jarre; Patrick Juvet
- Producer: Jean-Michel Jarre

Patrick Juvet singles chronology
"Faut pas rêver" (1976)	"Où sont les femmes?" (1977)	"Megalomania" (1977)

"Où sont les femmes?" (English: "Where are the women?") is a 1977 disco hit by Swiss singer Patrick Juvet. The song was composed by Juvet with lyrics by Jean-Michel Jarre, who also produced the track. It is considered one of the first French-language disco songs and the first to make it into the disco charts. It peaked at number one in Quebec, number two in Switzerland, number five in Wallonia and number six in France. It has gone on to sell over 250 thousand copies in France.

== Release and controversy ==
"Où sont les femmes ?" was released in Europe (including the UK) with the B-side "Les bleus au cœur", also written by Juvet and Jarre. However, in Canada, "Les bleus au cœur" was released as the follow-up single, topping the Quebec chart as well as entering the national RPM chart at number 100. Instead, "Megalomania", again written by Juvet and Jarre, was released as the B-side there, which in France was released as the follow-up single to "Où sont les femmes ?"

Despite its success, the song has faced controversy for being sexist. The lyrics make reference to the modern attitudes of women, whilst the singer is saying that as a result they have become devoid of femininity and he wishes to return to a bygone era. This is shown in the lyrics (translated): "They no longer speak of love, they wear their hair short and prefer motorbikes to birds", which can be compared with the lyrics later on, "where are the women? Whom we kiss and then they faint" and "who live on the receiving end of telegrams". As a result, Juvet was sent numerous insulting letters from the French Women's Liberation Movement.

In 1978, "Où sont les femmes ?" was re-recorded in English under the title, "Where Is My Woman?", and was featured on Juvet's English-language debut on Casablanca Records in the US. Victor Willis, original lead singer of Village People, was the lyricist for the project.

== Track listings ==
7-inch

1. "Où sont les femmes ?" – 4:13
2. "Les bleus au cœur" – 3:40

7-inch (Canada)

1. "Où sont les femmes ?" – 4:10
2. "Megalomania" – 3:12

12-inch

1. "Où sont les femmes ?" – 6:15
2. "Paris by Night" – 11:44

12-inch (Canada)

1. "Où sont les femmes ?" – 6:15
2. "Megalomania" – 5:35

== Charts ==
Chart (1977)	Peak position
Belgium (Ultratop 50 Wallonia)	5
France (IFOP)	6
Quebec (Palmarès Francophone)	1
Switzerland (Radio Suisse Romande)	2
