= Patrick Juvet =

Swiss singer-songwriter (1950–2021)

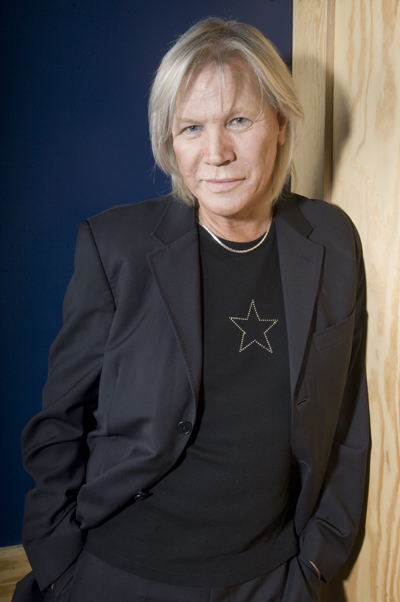
- Patrick Juvet in 2008

Background information
- Born: 21 August 1950; Montreux, Switzerland
- Died: c. 1 April 2021 (aged 70) Barcelona, Catalonia, Spain
- Genres: Pop, Disco
- Occupations: Singer, songwriter, model
- Years active: 1971–2021

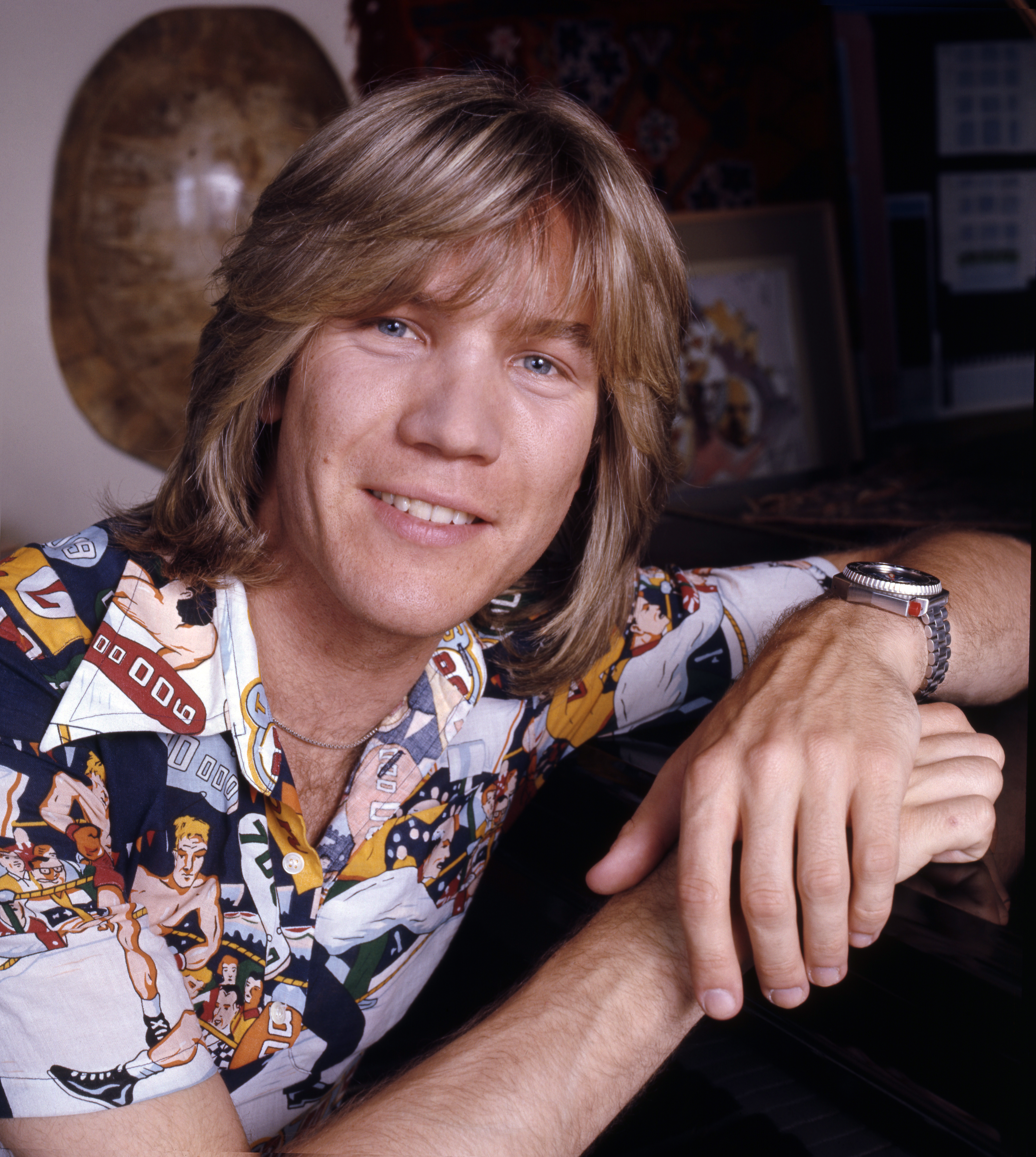
Patrick Juvet in 1976

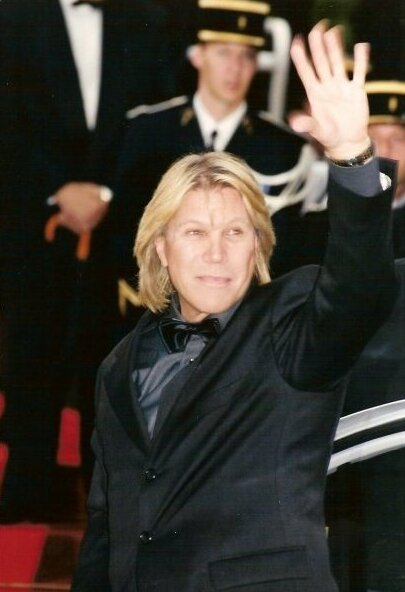
Patrick Juvet at the Cannes Film Festival in 2001

Patrick Juvet (21 August 1950 – c. 1 April 2021) was a Swiss singer-songwriter, who had a string of hit records in Europe. While his early career was focused on making pop records, he found international success as a disco music performer in the latter half of the 1970s. His biggest hit, "I Love America", made the top twenty in France, Sweden and the UK, and the top ten in the US disco chart.

== Biography ==
Born in Montreux, Switzerland, Juvet grew up in nearby La Tour-de-Peilz, with his parents, Robert and Janine, his brother Daniel, and his sister Nancy. Juvet's father sold radios and televisions, which sparked an early interest in music for the young Juvet. Juvet began studying piano at age 7; later he developed an interest in the music of The Beatles.

Juvet moved to Paris in 1968 at the age of 18 with little money. A friend encouraged him to become a model in Germany, and Juvet pursued this career in Düsseldorf, Germany, for two years. He returned to Paris in 1970.

In Saint-Tropez he met French music producer Eddie Barclay, who allowed him to record a first single in 1971. He wrote "Le Lundi au soleil", sung by Claude François. Later, Juvet began collaborating with French composer and musician Jean-Michel Jarre with this new material featured on Juvet's album, Love, which was released in 1973. Juvet represented Switzerland at the Eurovision Song Contest 1973 with "Je vais me marier, Marie," placing at no. 12 in the competition.

In 1977, Juvet collaborated again with Jarre on the French-language album, Paris by Night, which featured the hit song, "Où sont les femmes?" In 1978, he worked with noted disco producers Jacques Morali and Henri Belolo, who also produced Village People and The Ritchie Family, among other acts. As a result, Juvet soon experienced international success with the disco tracks, "Got a Feeling" and "I Love America".

In 1978, the aforementioned "Où sont les femmes?" was re-recorded in English under the title, "Where Is My Woman?", and was featured on Juvet's English-language debut on Casablanca Records in the U.S. Victor Willis, original lead singer of Village People, was the lyricist for the project.

His soundtrack score to David Hamilton's art house film Laura featured disco musicians Marc Chantereau and Slim Pezin of Voyage and Space session bassist Jannick Top. Although the music from Laura was never released on compact disc and was never released in the United States, it nonetheless sold 650,000 copies. Parts of the music were written and produced by the New Zealander Brian Southcombe (now deceased) who was once married to Charlotte Rampling. Southcombe, David Hamilton and another New Zealander (Hamilton's business manager) were at one time actively trying to set up a sequel movie to Laura and are said to have approached Juvet for more music.

With the decline of disco in the early 1980s, Juvet returned to the French music scene in 1982 with the album, Rêves immoraux. While selling respectably, the album failed to match Juvet's earlier commercial success. A time of financial and personal decline followed, with Juvet suffering periods of depression and alcoholism and relocating from mainland Europe to London, then to Los Angeles and finally, in the latter half of the 1980s, back to Switzerland.

Juvet returned to Paris in 1991 and to his roots as a singer-songwriter with the album, Solitudes. The disc featured more personal, emotional songs with Juvet being accompanied by French-language performers, Françoise Hardy, Luc Plamondon, and Marc Lavoine.

In 2005, Juvet released his autobiography Les bleus au cœur: Souvenirs ("Bruises on My Heart: Memories"), in which he talks about his career and his bisexuality.

On 1 April 2021, it was announced that Juvet was found dead at his apartment in Barcelona, aged 70. An autopsy report that was released on 8 April, concluded that Juvet died of cardiac arrest.

== Discography ==
- La musica (1973)
- Love (1973)
- Chrysalide (1974)
- Mort ou vif (1976)
- Paris by Night (1977)
- Got a Feeling (1978)
- Lady Night (1979)
- Still Alive (1980)
- Rêves immoraux (1982)
- Solitudes (1991)

Awards and achievements
Preceded by Véronique Müller with "C'est la chanson de mon amour"	Switzerland in the Eurovision Song Contest; 1973	Succeeded by Piera Martell with "Mein Ruf nach dir"
