= Thank God It's Friday (Love & Kisses song) =

Single by Love & Kisses

from the album Thank God It's Friday
- B-side: "You're the Most Precious Thing in My Life"
- Released: March 1978
- Recorded: 1977
- Genre: Disco
- Length: 4:14
- Label: Casablanca
- Songwriter: Alec R. Costandinos

Love & Kisses singles chronology
"Accidental Lover" (1977)	"Thank God It's Friday" (1978)	"How Much, How Much I Love You" (1978)

"Thank God It's Friday" is a 1978 disco song by the studio disco group Love & Kisses, popularized as the theme song of the film by the same name. It was written by European composer and producer Alec R. Costandinos. Along with the tracks: "Last Dance" by Donna Summer, "After Dark" by Pattie Brooks, and "Take it to the Zoo" by Sunshine, "Thank God It's Friday", peaked at #1 on Billboard's Disco charts. On other US charts, "Thank God It's Friday" went to #23 on the Hot Soul Singles chart and #22 on the Hot 100.

== Chart performance ==
Chart (1978)	Peak position
Australia (Kent Music Report)	56
Netherlands (Single Top 100)	48
New Zealand (Recorded Music NZ)	11
Sweden (Sverigetopplistan)	16
US Billboard Hot 100	22
US Billboard National Disco Action Top 40	1
US Billboard Hot Soul Singles	23

== Popular culture ==
- Over the years some radio stations would play the song at 5:00 p.m. on Fridays to mark the end of the work week and get its audience pumped-up for the weekend.
