= I Love America (Patrick Juvet song) =

Single by Patrick Juvet

from the album Got A Feeling - I Love America
- Released: 1978
- Recorded: 1978
- Studio: Sigma Sound, New York City; Sound Mixers, New York City
- Genre: Disco
- Length: 3:40 (7" single version); 13:55 (12" single version)
- Label: Barclay. Casablanca
- Songwriter(s): Jacques Morali, Patrick Juvet, Victor Willis
- Producer(s): Jacques Morali

Patrick Juvet singles chronology
"Got a Feeling" (1978)	"I Love America" (1978)	"Lady Night" (1979)

"I Love America" is a 1978 disco hit by Swiss singer Patrick Juvet. Along with the tracks, "Where Is My Woman" and "Got A Feeling", it peaked at number five on the disco chart in the United States. It was included in the compilation album, A Night at Studio 54, in 1979.

In 1996, "I Love America" was sampled for Full Intention's dance hit "America (I Love America)".

== Charts ==
Chart (1978)	Peak position
France (IFOP)	10
Netherlands (Single Top 100)	34
Sweden (Sverigetopplistan)	19
UK Singles (OCC)	12
Canada Top Singles (RPM)	9
