= Love & Kisses =

1970s disco group

- Origin: United Kingdom
- Genre: Disco
- Years active: 1977–1982
- Label: Casablanca
- Past members: Alec Costandinos

Love & Kisses is a 1970s disco group assembled by European producer Alec Costandinos, with a variety of male and female singers.

After collaborating on Cerrone's debut album Love In C Minor (1976), Costandinos assembled Love & Kisses in early 1977, and shortly after the group released their first album, Love and Kisses, which contained just two songs - and so was also classed as a double A-side single. These were "Accidental Lover" and "I Found Love (Now That I Found You)", which combined orchestral sounds, classical influences and a disco arrangement. The single charted at #1 for three weeks on Billboard's disco/dance chart.

The album cover has been criticized for depicting a woman with several men's hands ripping holes in her T-shirt, with one commentator writing, "Although rape is not overtly shown on this record cover, the picture conveys the impression of a gang rape about to happen." In a Billboard article about album covers depicting sex and violence against women, Casablanca Records' director of creative services admitted that he had "questions about the company's 'Love & Kisses' LP."

The following year saw the release of the group's second album entitled How Much, How Much I Love You (the title track covered side one, "Beauty and the Beast" completed side two, along with a love song, "Maybe"), utilizing the same basic formula. Both songs became top five disco hits. This was followed closely by the group's biggest hit, "Thank God It's Friday", the theme song from the film of the same name. It peaked at #23 R&B, #22 on the Billboard Hot 100 chart and #1 for six weeks on the Hot Dance Music/Club Play chart. The soundtrack, which featured Donna Summer's "Last Dance" and the Commodores "Too Hot ta Trot", was nominated for several Grammy Awards.

Their third and final album, You Must Be Love was released in 1979, but met with less success. Shortly thereafter, the group broke up.

== Discography ==
=== Albums ===
- 1977 Love and Kisses
- 1978 How Much, How Much I Love You
- 1979 You Must Be Love

=== Singles ===
- 1977 "I've Found Love (Now That I Found You)" b/w "Accidental Lover" - #1 on Hot Dance Music/Club Play
- 1977 "Accidental Lover" b/w "I've Found Love (Now That I Found You)" - #5 on Hot Dance Music/Club Play
- 1978 "Thank God It's Friday" b/w "You're the Most Precious Thing in My Life" (from the film "Thank God It's Friday"- #22 on Hot 100, #1 on Hot Dance Music/Club Play
- 1978 "How Much, How Much I Love You" b/w "Maybe"
- 1978 "You're The Most Precious Thing In My Life" (from the film "Thank God It's Friday")
- 1979 "You Must Be Love"

== See also ==
- List of number-one dance hits (United States)
- List of artists who reached number one on the US Dance chart
