= Voyage (band) =

French disco and pop/funk band

- Origin: Paris, France
- Genres: Disco; Eurodisco; pop
- Years active: 1977–1982
- Labels: Sirocco; Marlin; Atlantic
- Past members: Marc Chantereau; Pierre-Alain Dahan; Sauveur Mallia; André "Slim" Pezin; Sylvia Mason

Voyage (French pronunciation: [vwajaʒ]) was a French disco and pop group, consisting of André "Slim" Pezin (guitar/vocals), Marc Chantereau (keyboards/vocals), Pierre-Alain Dahan (drums/vocals) and Sauveur Mallia (bass), together with British lead vocalist Sylvia Mason-James, who sang on the group's first two albums, Voyage (1977) and Fly Away (1978).

For their next two albums, Pierre-Alain Dahan became the lead vocalist on Voyage 3 (1980) and on One Step Higher (1982), and the group's sound changed from disco to pop.

== Overview ==
Before Voyage, Pezin, Chantereau, Dahan and Mallia worked together in a band called V.I.P. Connection in 1975 with two disco songs: "Please Love Me Again" and "West Coast Drive", songs known by fans and collectors of early disco music.

They also worked as session musicians or in live performance in France, with artists such as Manu Dibango, Cerrone, Alec R. Costandinos & the Synchophonic Orchestra, Michel Sardou for Slim Pezin; Michel Legrand, Jean Musy, Bernard Lavilliers for Sauveur Mallia; Léo Ferré, Michel Delpech, Guy Béart or Johnny Hallyday for Marc Chantereau; Nino Ferrer, Jean-Claude Petit and Stéphane Grappelli.

From the late 1960s until the mid-1970s, they were in demand in France, Europe and worldwide, in all styles of music: jazz with Grappelli, French chanson with Ferré, world music and jazz with Dibango, rock with Hallyday, and French pop with Sardou and Delpech.

Their lone Billboard Hot 100 entry was "Souvenirs", which hit No. 41 in 1979. They had more success on the U.S. Hot Dance Club Play chart, where two of their albums, Voyage (1977) and Fly Away (1978), hit number one.

In the UK, the group had three chart singles. A double A-side, "From East to West"/"Scotch Machine" (the latter song retitled "Scots Machine" because the term "Scotch" is no longer used in Scotland), reached No. 13 in 1978, while later that year "Souvenirs" made No. 56. Also popular was the song "Lady America". Their last impact on the charts came in 1979 when "Let's Fly Away" peaked at number thirty-eight.

In their home country, France, they were successful in the nightclubs of Paris, and featured on radio and television promoting their songs, but they ranked only three singles: "From East to West" peaked at #20 on May 26, 1978, then "Souvenirs" peaked at No. 53 on January 12, 1979, and "Tahiti, Tahiti" peaked at No. 43 on May 5, 1979. However, the four musicians couldn't replicate their successful French record sales in the United States. The songs "I Don't Want to Fall in Love Again" in 1980 and "Let's Get Started" in 1982 failed to chart. As disco waned, they turned to making albums with a more mainstream pop sound.

In Netherlands the single "Discotch" was released in 1981; this was a compilation remix of four numbers ("Tahiti, Tahiti", "Latin Odyssey", "Bayou Village", "Scotch Machine"), made by Dutch DJ Eric Benjamin. The single peaked at No. 18 on June 27, 1981 in the Dutch Top 40 and stayed 9 weeks in the charts.

After Voyage, the group members worked separately with a number of singers, including Françoise Hardy, Alain Chamfort, Mylène Farmer, Guesch Patti, and Jean-Louis Murat. Pezin worked on the French movie soundtrack Betty Blue in 1986 and produced a French hit, "Caressé Mwen", sung by Marijosé Alie, in 1987. Sauveur Mallia worked on several movies soundtracks, like Moonstruck, with Cher, in 1987; Breakfast of Champions, with Bruce Willis, in 1999; and was involved in other projects with Chantereau and Dahan.

== Discography ==
=== Studio albums ===
Year	Title	Peak chart positions				Record label
Year	Title	AUS	UK	US	US R&B	Record label
1977	Voyage	93	59	40	57	Sirocco
1978	Fly Away	—	—	47	—	Sirocco
1980	Voyage 3	—	—	—	—	Sirocco
1981	One Step Higher	—	—	—	—	Sirocco
"—" denotes a recording that did not chart or was not released in that territory.

=== Compilation albums ===
- The Best of Voyage (1989, Unidisc Music)
- The Best of Voyage: "Souvenirs" (1991, Sirocco/Hot Productions)

=== Singles ===
Year	Title	Peak chart positions					Album
Year	Title	IRE	UK	US	US R&B	US Dan	Album
1978	"Lady America"	—	—	—	—	1	Voyage
1978	"From East to West"	20	13	—	85	1	Voyage
1978	"Scots Machine"	—	13	—	—	1	Voyage
1978	"Point Zero"	—	—	—	—	1	Voyage
1978	"Souvenirs"	—	56	41	73	1	Fly Away
1979	"Let's Fly Away"	—	38	105	—	1	Fly Away
1979	"Tahiti, Tahiti"	—	—	—	—	1	Fly Away
1980	"I Don't Want to Fall in Love Again"	—	—	—	—	—	Voyage 3
1980	"I Love You Dancer"	—	—	—	—	17	Voyage 3
1980	"Do It Again"	—	—	—	—	17	Voyage 3
1981	"Nowhere to Hide"	—	—	—	—	—	One Step Higher
1982	"I Surrender"	—	—	—	—	—	One Step Higher
1982	"Let's Get Started"	—	—	—	—	—	One Step Higher
1982	"Follow the Brightest Star"	—	—	—	—	—	One Step Higher
"—" denotes a recording that did not chart or was not released in that territory.

== See also ==
- List of artists who reached number one on the US Dance chart
- List of number-one dance hits (United States)
