= Slim Pezin =

French guitarist (1945–2024)

André Pezin
- Also known as: Slim Pezin
- Born: October 25, 1945
- Died: January 18, 2024 (aged 78)

André Pezin (25 October 1945 – 18 January 2024), also known as Slim Pezin, was a French guitarist, music arranger, musical producer and conductor who worked for many important people in French orchestra, from Claude François -- for whom he directed the orchestra -- to people like Michel Sardou, Silvie Vartan, Johnny Hallyday, Charles Aznavour and Mylène Farmer.

== Biography ==
André Pezin started playing the guitar at 17, and started a group with some friends before accompanying, after 1963, the singer Noël Deschamps.

Habituated to playing with the Perez Prado's Cuban musicians in Paris, Slim Pezin began working at the beginning of 1965 with some African musicians like Manu Dibango. From 1967 to 1971, he was Nino Ferrer's guitarist. He was Claude Francois's director of orchestra beginning in 1971. After that, he and two friends and colleagues founded the Voyage group (active between 1977 and 1982), whose first two albums would be gold records.

In 1984, Slim Pezin participated in the recording of Mylène Farmer's first single, and he has appeared since on most of her albums and during her concerts. He accompanied numerous French artists, as well as international ones like Ray Charles and Tina Turner.

Also a film composer (Nos jours heureux by Éric Toledano and Olivier Nakache, Viva Cuba), he participated in numerous studio recordings. He was also the producer of groups like La Souris délinguée or Chagrin d'amour.

It was Slim Pezin, former administrator of the Spedidam (a French society for the intellectual rights of recording artists), who suggested to the Claudettes to reclaim their image rights, which they obtained, with much difficulty.

Slim Pezin was also a big collector of guitars, cars, and African dolls. He had ten children.

Pezin died on 18 January 2024, at the age of 78.

== Albums ==
- 1975: Africa Oumba
- 2003: Africadelic
- 2004: Agents secrets
- 2004: Vidocq
