= Alec R. Costandinos =

- Born: Alexandre Garbis Sarkis Kouyoumdjian; 20 March 1944 (age 82); Cairo, Egypt
- Origin: France
- Genres: Disco, Euro disco
- Instruments: Keys, vocals
- Years active: 1976–present
- Label: Casablanca Records

Alec Rupen Costandinos (born Alexandre Garbis Sarkis Kouyoumdjian, 20 March 1944) is a French composer, music producer, songwriter and singer, known for his contributions to disco music. He dominated the disco and Euro-disco genres in the late 1970s.

== Biography ==
Costandinos was born on 20 March 1944, in Cairo, Egypt. His father was Armenian and his mother was Greek.

He began his career as a publisher and producer for various artists, including French pop star Claude Francois and chanteuse Dalida. After writing Cerrone's "Love in C Minor" (1976), Costandinos was signed to Barclay Records. He released his first album, a self-titled effort under the name Love & Kisses in 1977, which featured the tracks "I Found Love (Now That I Found You)" and "Accidental Lover", which together reached #1 on Billboard's disco chart. Costandinos went on to release a number of wildly successful records under the prominent American disco label, Casablanca. His album, Romeo & Juliet has been credited for bringing the concept album to dance music. Its title track also went to #1 on the Billboard disco chart for one week in 1978. He also wrote "Thank God It's Friday", once again recorded by Love & Kisses, the theme track to the disco film of the same name.

Costandinos was involved as a writer in the development of many productions of Demis Roussos. He also contributed to the debut album of Crystal Grass, which featured the club hit "Crystal World", released on the Philips label in France. He has also written under the pseudonym R. Rupen. He often worked with a collective of backing singers, the Birds of Paris, some of whom later became famous in their own right. According to what he declared in one of his rare interviews on 11 December 2011 at Open House Radio (Miami), his disco works were basically influenced by Philly sound, classical and melodic Italian music.

== Discography ==
- 1978 Romeo & Juliet (Casablanca)
- 1978 Hunchback of Notre Dame (Casablanca)
- 1978 Trocadero Lemon Blue (Casablanca)
- 1979 The Synchophonic Orchestra Featuring Alirol and Jacquet (Casablanca)
- 1979 Winds of Change (Casablanca)
- 1981 Americana (RCA)

With Love & Kisses

- 1977 Love and Kisses (Casablanca)
- 1978 How Much, How Much I Love You (Casablanca)
- 1979 You Must Be Love (Casablanca)
- 1982 Bap Bap/Right Here in My World (Disc'AZ)

With others

- 1977 Judas (as Sphinx) (Casablanca)
- 1977 Golden Tears (as Sumeria) (Casablanca)
- 1978 Trocadero Bleu Citron – Original Soundtrack (Casablanca)
- 1978 Paris Connection (Casablanca)
- 1979 Winds of Change – Original Soundtrack (Casablanca)
- 1980 John And Arthur Simms (Casablanca) The Birds of Paris
- 1981 Le Group (Disc'AZ)

== See also ==
- List of number-one dance hits (United States)
- List of artists who reached number one on the US Dance chart
