= Jon Anderson discography =

The discography of British born singer-songwriter and musician Jon Anderson.

== Solo works ==
=== Studio albums ===
List of studio albums, with selected details and chart positions
Title	Details	Peak chart positions			
Title	Details	AUS	US	UK	NLD
Olias of Sunhillow	Released: 9 July 1976; Label: Atlantic	68	47	8	—
Song of Seven	Released: 7 November 1980; Label: Atlantic	—	143	38	—
Animation	Released: May 1982; Labels: Atlantic, Polydor	97	176	43	3
3 Ships	Released: 18 November 1985; Labels: Elektra, Opio	—	166	—	66
In the City of Angels	Released: 17 May 1988; Label: Columbia	—	—	—	—
Deseo	Released: 19 July 1994; Label: Windham Hill	—	—	—	—
Change We Must	Released: 17 October 1994; Labels: EMI, Angel	—	—	—	—
Angels Embrace	Released: 27 September 1995; Label: Higher Octave	—	—	—	—
Toltec	Released: 1 July 1996; Labels: High Street, Windham Hill	—	—	—	—
Lost Tapes of Opio	Released: 1996; Label: Opio Foundation	—	—	—	—
The Promise Ring	Released: 17 June 1997; Labels: OM Town, Higher Octave	—	—	—	—
Earth Mother Earth	Released: 9 September 1997; Label: Ellipsis Arts	—	—	—	—
The More You Know	Released: 14 April 1998; Labels: Purple Pyramid, Eagle	—	—	—	—
Survival & Other Stories	Released: 6 June 2011; Labels: Gonzo, Voiceprint	—	—	—	—
1000 Hands: Chapter One	Released: 31 March 2019; Labels:	—	—	—	—
True	Released: 23 August 2024; Labels: Frontiers Records S.R.L.	—	—	—	—
"—" denotes a recording that did not chart or was not released in that territory.

=== Production music ===
- Sunlight (2021)

=== Live albums ===
- Live from La La Land (2007)
- Live - Perpetual Change (14 March 2025) (with The Band Geeks)

=== Collection ===
- The Lost Tapes (2006–2008) (live performances, unreleased demo albums, etc.) (planned as a 20-CD boxset but only 7 CDs have been released as yet)
  - Interview (2006) (JAVPBX01CD)
  - The Mother's Day Concert (2006) (demos) (JAVPBX02CD)
  - Searching for the Songs (2006) (demos) (JAVPBX03CD)
  - Live in Sheffield 1980 (2006) (JAVPBX04CD)
  - Watching the Flags That Fly (2006) (JAVPBX05CD) (Jon Anderson's personal demos, worked on in the south of France in 1990, for the never-officially released second ABWH studio album whose working title was Dialogue)
  - The Lost Tapes of Opio (2007) (JAVPBX06CD)
  - From Me to You (2008) (JAVPBX07CD)

=== Videos ===
- Tour of the Universe (2005) (live DVD)

=== Singles ===
List of singles, with selected chart positions, showing year released and album name
Title	Year	Peak chart positions			Album
Title	Year	UK	NLD	US	Album
"Never My Love"	1968	—	—	—	Non-album singles (Note: As 'Hans Christian'.)
"Mississippi Hobo"	1968	—	—	—	Non-album singles
"Flight of the Moorglade"	1976	—	—	—	Olias of Sunhillow
"Some Are Born"	1980	—	—	109	Song of Seven
"Take Your Time"	1980	—	—	—	Song of Seven
"Heart of the Matter"	1981	—	—	—	Song of Seven
"Everybody Loves You"	1981	—	—	—	Song of Seven
"Surrender"	1982	—	7	—	Animation
"All in a Matter of Time"	1982	—	—	—	Animation
"Boundaries"	1982	—	—	—	Animation
"Cage of Freedom"	1984	—	—	— (Note: 1. 16 on the Mainstream Rock chart.)	Metropolis Soundtrack
"Easier Said Than Done"	1985	88	48	— (Note: 1. 38 on the Adult Contemporary chart.)	3 Ships
"How It Hits You" (Note: Released in France only.)	1985	—	—	—	3 Ships
"Hold On to Love"	1988	81	28	—	In the City of Angels
"Is It Me"	1988	—	—	—	In the City of Angels
"Reach Out"	1989	—	—	—	Charity Single: BBC Children in Need
"Far Far Cry"	1990	—	—	—	Jonathan Elias' Requiem for the Americas: Songs from the Lost World
"Change We Must"	1994	81	—	—	Change We Must
"Candle Song"	1994	182	—	—	Change We Must
"Maybe"	1998	—	—	—	The More You Know
"State of Independence"	2005	—	—	—	Tour of the Universe
"Open"	2011	—	—	—	Non-album singles
"Brasilian Music Sound"	2012	—	—	—	Non-album singles
"Race to the End"	2012	—	—	—	Non-album singles
"Go Screw Yourself"	2020	—	—	—	Non-album singles
"—" denotes a recording that did not chart or was not released in that territory.

== Collaborations ==
=== Pre-Yes ===
==== The Warriors ====
- Singles :

- 1964 : "You Came Along" / "Don't Make Me Blue" (7", Single)

- Album :

- 2003 : Bolton Club 65 - Recorded live in 1965 and published on CD in 2003 on Voiceprint Label.

=== Yes ===
- Yes (1969)
- Time and a Word (1970)
- The Yes Album (1971)
- Fragile (1971)
- Close to the Edge (1972)
- Yessongs (1973) (triple live album)
- Tales from Topographic Oceans (1973) (double studio album)
- Relayer (1974)
- Yesterdays (1975) (studio compilation including rare cuts)
- Going for the One (1977)
- Tormato (1978)
- Yesshows (1980) (double live album, originally intended as triple)
- Classic Yes (1980) (studio compilation with two bonus unreleased live cuts)
- 90125 (1983)
- 9012Live: The Solos (1985) (live)
- Big Generator (1987)
- Union (1991)
- Yesyears (1991) (quadruple CD compilation box set including rare and unreleased tracks)
- Talk (1994)
- Keys to Ascension (1996) (studio & live double CD album)
- Keys to Ascension 2 (1997) (studio & live double CD album)
- Something's Coming: The BBC Recordings 1969–1970 (1997; a.k.a. Astral Traveller)
- Open Your Eyes (1997)
- Yes, Friends and Relatives (1998) (double CD album compilation including remake of Owner of a Lonely Heart)
- The Ladder (1999)
- House of Yes: Live from House of Blues (2000) (double CD live album)
- Magnification (2001)
- In a Word: Yes (1969–) (2002) (quintuple CD compilation box set including rare and unreleased tracks)
- The Ultimate Yes: 35th Anniversary Collection (2004) (U.S. triple CD album edition including unreleased acoustic versions)
- The Word Is Live (2005) (triple CD live album)
- Live at Montreux 2003 (2007) (double CD live album)
- Union Live (2011) (double CD live album)
- Progeny: Seven Shows from Seventy-Two (2015) (14-CD live box set)

=== Jon and Vangelis ===
Studio albums

- Short Stories (1980)
- The Friends of Mr Cairo (1981)
- Private Collection (1983)
- Page of Life (1991)
- Page of Life (1998) (Alternate version not approved by Vangelis)

Compilations

- The Best of Jon and Vangelis (1984)
- Chronicles (1994)

=== Anderson, Harley & Batt ===
- Whatever You Believe (1988) (charity single)

=== Anderson Bruford Wakeman Howe ===
- Anderson Bruford Wakeman Howe (1989)
- In the Big Dream - A Video Compilation (1989) (video)
- An Evening of Yes Music Plus (1993) (double live album, recorded in 1989)
- An Evening of Yes Music Plus (1993) (video)
- Live at the NEC (2012) (2CD + 1DVD live album, recorded in 1989)

=== Anderson/Wakeman ===
- The Living Tree (2010)
- The Living Tree in Concert Part One (2011) (CD live album)

=== Jon Anderson & Matt Malley ===
- Family Circle (2014, download only charity single)

=== Jon Anderson & Michael Byrne ===
- Visions (2025, digital only)

=== Anderson-Ponty Band ===
- Better Late Than Never (2015) (CD/DVD live album)

=== Jon Anderson & Roine Stolt ===
- Invention of Knowledge (June 2016)

=== Yes Featuring Jon Anderson, Trevor Rabin, Rick Wakeman ===
- Live at the Apollo (2018) (2CD live album)

== Guest appearances ==
With Johnny Harris:

- All to Bring You Morning (1969; 1973), on the track "All to Bring You Morning" (also featuring Steve Howe & Alan White)

With King Crimson:

- Lizard (1970), on the track "Prince Rupert Awakes"

With Colin Scot:

- Colin Scot (1971) Credited as "John Anderson (Dr Yes)" next to Rick "Broken Toes" Wakeman.

With Iron Butterfly:

- Scorching Beauty (1974) co-writer on the track "Pearly Gates"

With Vangelis:

- Heaven and Hell (1975), on the track "So Long Ago, So Clear"
- Opéra Sauvage (1979), plays harp on the track "Flamants Roses"
- See You Later (1980), on the tracks "Suffocation" and "See You Later"

With Alan White:

- Ramshackled (1976), on the track "Spring - Song Of Innocence" (also featuring Steve Howe)

With Rick Wakeman:

- 1984 (1981), on the track "The Hymn"

With Mike Oldfield:

- Crises (1983), on the track "In High Places"
- "Shine (Extended Version)" Single (1986). Included on "The Platinum Collection" (2006)

Soundtracks:

- Metropolis (1984), on the track "Cage of Freedom"
- St. Elmo's Fire (1985), on the track "This Time It Was Really Right"
- Biggles (1986), on the tracks "Do You Want to Be a Hero" and "Chocks Away"

With Tangerine Dream:

- Legend Soundtrack (1985), on the track "Loved by the Sun"

With John Paul Jones:

- Music from the Film "Scream for Help" (1985), on the tracks "Silver Train" and "Christie"

With Lawrence Gowan:

- Great Dirty World (1987), on the track "Moonlight Desires"

With Hiroshima:

- Go (1987), on the track "Go"

With Toto:

- The Seventh One (1988), on the track "Stop Loving You"

With Jonathan Elias:

- Requiem for the Americas: Songs from the Lost World (1990), on the tracks "Within the Lost World" and "Far Far Cry"
- Prayer Cycle: Path To Zero (2011), on the track "Devotion"

With Kitaro:

- Dream (1992), on the tracks "Lady of Dreams", "Agreement", "Dream of Chant" and "Island of Life"

With London Philharmonic Orchestra:

- Symphonic Music of Yes (1993), on the tracks "Roundabout" and "I've Seen All Good People"

With Charlie Bisharat:

- Along the Amazon (1993), on the track "Along the Amazon"

With Steve Bailey:

- Evolution (1993), on the track "Evolution"

With Ayman:

- Dancing with My Soul (1994), on the track "Opionium"

With Milton Nascimento:

- Angelus (1994), on the track "Estrelada"

With Tadamitsu Saito:

- It's About Time (1995), on the tracks "Doshyamo", "Cascadia", and "It's About Time"

With Cielo Y Tierra:

- Heaven and Earth (1996), on the tracks "El Dia" and "La Segunda Oracion" - Mexican CD edition is self-titled and includes "La Segunda Oracion (Mountain High Remix)" as a bonus track.

With Sir John Betjeman & Mike Read:

- Words/Music (1998), on the track "Youth and Age" - Album re-released several times under different titles, including Centenary (2006) and "Sound of Poetry" (2008).

With 4 Him:

- Streams - Various Artists (1999), on the track: "The Only Thing I Need". Also on "The Best of the 2000 Dove Awards" (2000)

With Steve Howe:

- Portraits of Bob Dylan (1999), on the track "Sad Eyed Lady of the Lowlands"

With Béla Fleck and the Flecktones:

- Outbound (2000), on the tracks "A Moment So Close" and "Aimun"

With Eduardo Del Signore:

- Captivated (2001), keys on the tracks "Cocos Azules", "Captivated" & "Sight". wind controller on "Boabdil" and vocals on "Hope"

With Robert Downey, Jr.

- The Futurist (2004), on the track "Your Move"

With Paul Green School Of Rock Music:

- Rock School Soundtrack (2005), on the track "Heart of the Sunrise"

With The Fellowship:

- In Elven Lands (2006), on the tracks "Dan Barliman's Jig", "Eléchoi", "The Sacred Stones" and "Verses to Elbereth Gilthoniel"

With Dream Theater:

- Systematic Chaos (2007), spoken word guest on a section of the track "Repentance"

With Glass Hammer:

- Culture of Ascent (2007), on the tracks "South Side Of The Sky" and "Life by Light"

With Alan Simon:

- Excalibur II: L'Anneau des Celtes (The Celtic Ring) (2007), on the track "Circle of Life"

With Fritz Heede:

- Ritual Path (2007), on the track "Come By"

With Tommy Zvoncheck:

- ZKG (2008), on the track "The Rain in Florida"

With Peter Machajdík:

- Namah (2008), on the track "Sadness of Flowing"
- The Lynx Liaison (Návrat Rysov) (Soundtrack) (2010), on the track "Cats Alive"

With Michael Mollura:

- The Highest Pass Soundtrack (2011), on the tracks "The Highest Pass Title Song'" and "Waking Up"

With Marco Sabiu:

- Audio Ergo Sum (2012), on the track "Limitless Lives"

With Dennis Haklar:

- Lizard's Tale (2012), on the tracks "Leap of Faith", "Prelude to Dawn", "Dawn of an Era" and "Crossing Over"

With Jean Philippe Rykiel:

- Inner Spaces (2012), on the track "Close to You"

With Jeff Pevar:

- From the Core (2012), on the track "River of Dreams"

With Wave Mechanics Union:

- Further to Fly (2012), on the tracks "It Will Be a Good Day (The River)" and "Wonderous Stories"

With Everyday Animals:

- Under the Tyranny of Good Weather (2013), on the track "False Awakening"

With Todmobile:

- Úlfur (2014), on the track "Wings Of Heaven" - Also includes a DVD of a live concert performing several Yes songs.

With The Spaces Between:

- Let's Leave It at This for Now... (2014), on the track "Orchasm"

With Wanabi Farmeur:

- Wanabi Farmeur (2014), on the track "Floating Stick"

With HuDost & Steve Kilbey:

- The Word Is... (2015), on the track "OMEGA"

With Andrew Rubin:

- Guitar Concerto (2016), co-writer, does not perform.

With Oakes & Smith:

- Between The Earth and the Sky (2016), on the track "Closer to Home"

With Battles:

- Juice B Crypts (2019), on the track "Sugar Foot" (also featuring Prairie WWWW)

With Trip the Witch:

- Trip the Witch (2021), on the track "Saturn We Miss You"
