= The Living Tree in Concert Part One =

Live album by Jon Anderson & Rick Wakeman
- Released: 28 November 2011
- Genre: Progressive rock
- Length: 56:37
- Label: Gonzo Multimedia (HST097CD)
- Producer: Jon Anderson; Rick Wakeman

Jon Anderson & Rick Wakeman chronology
Survival & Other Stories (2011)	The Living Tree in Concert Part One (2011)	Better Late Than Never (2015)

Professional ratings
Review scores
Source	Rating
New Age Music World (blog)	very favorable

The Living Tree in Concert Part One is a live album by Jon Anderson and Rick Wakeman (as Anderson/Wakeman, both previously members of progressive rock band Yes), released in November 2011 by Gonzo Multimedia.

== Overview ==
In a certain way, The Living Tree in Concert Part One is a sort of live-in-concert version of the Anderson/Wakeman's studio album The Living Tree previously released in late 2010.

== Cover art ==
The cover art designed by Mark Wilkinson, is similar to the royal blue background, with yellow and orange colored tree on The Living Tree studio album cover.

== Reception ==
The Living Tree in Concert Part One received a positive review from the New Age Music World blog's author John P. Olsen, stating: «[As a live] complement [to] their earlier in-studio version of The Living Tree release, [...] this new "In Concert CD" is fantastic news to millions of progressive rock music fans everywhere. You can always count on Jon and Rick for new music in a variety of genres!», adding: «Fans of the group Yes have something to cheer about since the CD features some classic Yes songs.», also citing «a concert review describing their songs from Yes [as] a departure from what [one] might expect, but [are] still endearing as [one] can imagine.»

== Track listing ==
All new tracks (taken from 2010's The Living Tree) lyrics by Anderson, music by Wakeman, except "Just One Man" (lyrics: Anderson; music: Jeremy Cubert; music performed by Wakeman)

No.	Title	Length
1.	"And You & I"	5:19
2.	"Living Tree (Part 1)"	4:05
3.	"Morning Star"	4:24
4.	"Long Distance Runaround"	2:49
5.	"The Garden"	3:07
6.	"Living Tree (Part 2)"	4:19
7.	"Time and a Word"	4:56
8.	"Just One Man"	4:47
9.	"23/24/11"	5:43
10.	"Southside of the Sky"	6:50
11.	"House of Freedom"	6:20
12.	"The Meeting"	3:58

== Personnel ==
- Jon Anderson – vocals, acoustic guitars
- Rick Wakeman – piano, keyboards and synthesisers
