= Open (Jon Anderson EP) =

OPEN

EP by Jon Anderson
- Released: 25 October 2011
- Recorded: 2010–2011
- Length: 20:54
- Label: Gonzo Multimedia
- Producer: Jon and Jane Anderson

Jon Anderson chronology
Survival & Other Stories (2010)	OPEN (2011)	The Living Tree in Concert Part One (2011)

Professional ratings
Review scores
Source	Rating
Something Else!	very favorable

Open is a long-form piece of music released in digital form by Yes former lead singer Jon Anderson, released in 2011.

== About the EP ==
Anderson began work on "Open" in the spring of 2010, when he began to lay down its foundation on his 19th Century guitar. From the start, he knew that it would become a long form musical composition. Later on, orchestration was added by Stefan Podell.

== Track listing ==
1. Open 20:54
  1. Sun is Calling
  2. Please To Remember
  3. Who Better Than Love
  4. Sun it Sings You / Given Chase

== Credits ==
- Music & lyrics written by Jon Anderson with additional music by Stefan Podell.

=== Personnel ===
- Jon Anderson – vocals, acoustic guitar
- Stefan Podell – music and orchestration, 6 and 12 string guitars, classical guitar, electric guitar, percussion, bass, additional vocals
- Zach Page – classical and electric guitar
- Kevin Shima – acoustic guitar, vocals
- Zach Tenorio-Miller – piano, organ
- Alexandra Cutler-Fetkewicz, Jon Fink and Susan Lerner – string arrangement and recording
- Brian Hobart – percussion
- Stephan Junca – drum kit, African percussion
- Charles Scott – drum kit
- Jane Luttenberger Anderson – "angel vocals"
- Robert Foster, Ian O'Rourke, Madelyn Frey, Jacob Stringfellow, Aaron Wolfe and Amy Stevens – Choral Via Cal Poly A Cappella Group
- Billy James – additional backing vocals

=== Recording ===
- Engineer – Mike Fraumeni
- Mastered by Sakis Anastopoulos

=== Production ===
- Produced by Jon and Jane Anderson.

=== Artwork ===
- Artwork by Jay Nungesser and John Amick

== Reviews ==
=== Something Else Reviews ===
"A conceptually epic piece, filled with wonderment, musical twists and a theme as broad as it is hopeful... Quite frankly, this is what Jon Anderson does. And it's terrifically engaging, after too long spent fitting his muse into the ever-dilating structures of Yes's modern-day prog-pop, to hear Anderson doing it again."
