= Promise ring =

Promise ring may refer to:

- Pre-engagement ring, a ring worn to signify a commitment to a monogamous relationship and a promise for an engagement in the future
- Purity ring, a ring worn to signify a pledge to sexual abstinence until marriage
- "Promise Ring" (song), a 2007 song by American entertainer Tiffany Evans
- The Promise Ring, an American emo band from Milwaukee, Wisconsin
- The Promise Ring (album), a 1997 solo album by Yes lead singer Jon Anderson
