= The Band Geeks =

American progressive rock band

- The Band Geeks with Jon Anderson

Background information
- Genres: Progressive rock; art rock; symphonic rock; pop rock
- Years active: 2014–present
- Members: Richie Castellano; Andy Ascolese; Andy Graziano; Rob Schmoll; Christopher Clark; Phil Castellano
- Past members: Robert Kipp

The Band Geeks is an American progressive rock group founded by Richie Castellano. They began by performing online covers of classic rock compositions. They have been touring since 2023 with Yes founder and vocalist Jon Anderson as "Jon Anderson and the Band Geeks" and collaborated with him on the 2024 album True.

== History ==
In May 2014, American musician and engineer Richie Castellano began a podcast called "Band Geek with Richie Castellano". Band Geek started as an audio-only podcast but morphed into a YouTube band featuring a revolving group of his friends and special guests, collectively known as the Band Geeks. The Band Geeks cover classic rock and pop songs, and have often featured songs by Yes.

This brought them to the attention of founding Yes singer Jon Anderson, which led to Anderson and the Band Geeks–including Castellano, along with drummer Andy Ascolese, guitarists Andy Graziano and Rob Schmoll, and keyboardists Christopher Clark and Robert Kipp–touring the US together in 2023 playing a set of classic Yes songs. Castellano recalled that the combination of talents were a unique recipe for success: "If you can take a band that can sound like that, with Jon’s voice, that’s what people want to hear."

They toured together again in 2024 and 2025, with Matt Beck filling in for Graziano for one leg, and together released a new album True in August 2024 on Frontiers Music co-billed as Jon Anderson and the Band Geeks. Richie Castellano is credited as co-producer, co-writer, engineer and mixer on the album, which had generally positive reviews, with The Progressive Aspect saying it is "a joyful listen from start to end, the quality is consistently high and the balance between originality and Yes-inspiration is delivered to perfection." Another notes of the Band Geeks' work on the album: "They have clearly mastered the classic idiom of Yes music. And they are brilliant musicians and composers in their own right. They can work with Jon to compose new Yes music of the highest calibre." Of the collaboration, Jon Anderson says "I've got the Yes that I wanted" and expressed that it allowed him to stop wishing for a reunion with Steve Howe's Yes.

On December 12, 2024, it was announced that a live album entitled Live – Perpetual Change would be released on March 14, 2025 in various formats (CD/DVD, vinyl and Blu-ray). Recorded and filmed with Jon Anderson at the Arcada Theater in St. Charles, Illinois, in May 2023, the release is composed entirely of tracks from Yes's classic 1970s era. Classic Rock Magazine called the result "ridiculously good" and noted that the band was "up to the task, respectfully reproducing songs created five decades ago" and also makes note of their "stunning backing vocals."

On November 10, 2025, it was announced that a second studio album with Anderson would be released in the second half of 2026, and that a multi-leg 2026 tour would commence in the spring with US dates.

== Discography ==
Jon Anderson and The Band Geeks

- True (August 23, 2024)
- Live – Perpetual Change (March 14, 2025)

== Band members ==
=== Current official members ===
- Richie Castellano – backing vocals, bass (2023–present)
- Andy Ascolese – drums, backing vocals (2023–present)
- Andy Graziano – guitar, backing vocals (2023–present)
- Phil Castellano – keyboard, guitar, percussion, backing vocals (2025–present)
- Chris Clark – keyboard, backing vocals (2023–present)

=== Former official members ===
- Rob Kipp – Keyboards, guitar, backing vocals (2023–2024)

=== Touring musicians ===
- Matt Beck – guitar, backing vocals (filled in for Graziano during the 2025 first leg)
- Angus Clark – guitar, backing vocals (filled in for Graziano during the 2026 European leg)
