= The Songs of Zamran: Son of Olias =

Project by Jon Anderson

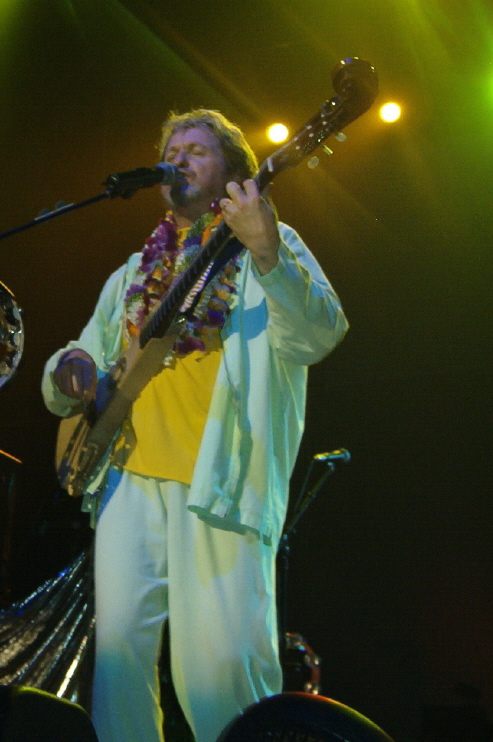
Anderson performing in 2003

The Songs of Zamran: Son of Olias is the working title of a studio album by English singer-songwriter Jon Anderson that has been in development since 2000. It is a sequel to Anderson's solo debut Olias of Sunhillow (1976), a conceptual progressive rock album based on the story of four alien tribes and their journey to a new home after their planet is destroyed by a volcanic eruption.

== Background ==
Anderson's debut solo album, Olias of Sunhillow, was released in July 1976 by Atlantic Records. In a 2001 interview, he revealed that he had been working for a year on the music for a sequel album, and was excited about the ideas that were being put down. Anderson predicted the product would be ready for "next summer", but the release never occurred. In 2004, Anderson called for people who wished to collaborate with him on the project to contact him through his website. Around the time Olias of Sunhillow was reissued by Wounded Bird Records in February 2006, Anderson announced that the title of the sequel would be The Songs of Zamran: Son of Olias.

In July 2009, Anderson said that he had been working on the album for the past three years, and that its potential for ideas had caused him to produce enough material for three albums. He predicted that it "may come out next year", but this did not come into fruition. In 2011, Anderson hoped to have the first part released within a year, but this did not happen. By this time, the album had grown to be 3 hours in length with most of the music having already been written, but Anderson needed further time to work out "how to recreate it correctly". He announced the intention to produce an interactive album by releasing it in the form of an app which "allows people to go on a journey, [to] choose a new journey every time they open it up, and hear it in a different way every time." Around this time Anderson had been working with three people based in Poland, Canada, and Brazil on the visual aspects. In late 2012, a website was launched on SevenDragons entitled the Zamran Experience which gave a preview of the album which was described as "an interactive audio-visual album".

In January 2013, Anderson said the album was still in development, adding: "I have the ingredients but I haven't put it in the oven yet." He confirmed that he had invited musicians from various parts of the world collaborate with him online, and put the album's delay down to commitments to other projects and the difficulty in finding the "right narrative" for The Songs of Zamran. Anderson had rewritten the story for the album five times. Development continued in 2014, and in February 2021, Anderson said the album was now "up to about two hours of music" and had multiple versions of every song recorded for it. He is still unsure on how to present the album.

In March 2022, Anderson revealed that the album should contain four sections with a total running time of over 4 hours. He had finished the first two, and was faced with the task of working out "the story interwoven between the layers." The next update was issued in January 2023, with the release of two separate trailer videos posted on his Facebook and YouTube channels amounting to 10 minutes of music. The artwork was produced by Jim Higgins and the videography by Mick Byrne.

== Theme ==
According to Anderson, The Songs of Zamran will be based on the creation of the structure of the Earth and how the world works, with references to crystal streams and ley lines. He continued: "At each juncture you find about more about the mysteries of the planet earth and then more about the mysteries of the human condition, and then more about the inter-dimensional condition of this planet and how many inter-dimensional beings are out there that we don't see. And then of course, the extension of that is the inter-galactic people that we don't see." Anderson also hinted that the story may cover the idea that "mother Earth is an almighty computer."

== Artwork ==
In 2009, Anderson contacted stained glass artist Steven Kelso and invited him to produce artwork for the album. The pair produced a stained glass piece entitled "Dyerexus: The Zamran Glider", and made ten paintings and numerous drawings for The Songs of Zamran based on Anderson's ideas that he sent to Kelso via e-mail twice a week. Kelso said the Dyerexus piece as the pinnacle of their collaboration. Kelso and Anderson continued to work on the project through 2012, with artwork and featured videos posted on Anderson's website.

== Released material ==
- "Sing to Me" (3:05) (2011/2013) (music: Jon Anderson & Jamie Dunlap; lyrics: Jon Anderson)
- "Untitled early demo" (2:00) (2013/2014) (music: Jon Anderson & Fritz Heede; lyrics: Jon Anderson)
