= 3 Ships =

Studio album by Jon Anderson
- Released: 18 November 1985
- Recorded: 1984–85
- Studios: Crystal Studios, Hollywood, Los Angeles, California, USA
- Genres: pop, synth-pop, art pop, Christmas
- Length: 39:41 (1985 Original Release); 63:54 (2007 CD Remaster)
- Labels: Elektra LP; Opio Media CD
- Producer: Roy Thomas Baker

Jon Anderson chronology
Animation (1982)	3 Ships (1985)	In the City of Angels (1988)

3 Ships is the fourth solo album by Yes lead singer Jon Anderson, released on Elektra Records in 1985. It includes versions of traditional Christmas carols as well as original material by Anderson. The album title references the carol "I Saw Three Ships". It was dedicated to the organisation Beyond War.

== Background ==
Interviewed by Chris Welch in Kerrang! during December 1985, Anderson was forthright about the inspiration and purpose of the album. "Of course it's a Christmas album, that's the whole idea. Look at the cover. 'Three Ships come sailing in on Christmas Day in the f**king morning!'... It's a one-off, something I'll never do again. I'm not getting particularly religious about it, I just wanted to make a record that will appeal to people's feelings. We're all going to the same place in the end. All the rivers flow to the same ocean... you know me, cosmic!"

The album was conceived and recorded in between the end of the Yes tour phase supporting 90125 and the beginning of the sessions for Big Generator. Picking up the story, Anderson recalled "a couple of months back we hadn't quite got into recording the Yes album, so we said 'OK, summer is off'. But I thought, 'I've got to do something this year'. Last Christmas I was walking around New York and I thought 'Gosh, I've gotta do a Christmas album one day.' So I had a month or so with nothing to do, and told my manager I wanted to make one.

"It's not a solo album as such, like Song of Seven. I wanted to work with a gospel choir, a young orchestra and get kids to come in and sing along with some rock musicians and do a Christmassy vibe. Just for fun, really. But the choir were very serious spiritual people and there was a lot of high energy that took over the album. Whether you are a Christian or a Jew, there is a certain feeling about Christmas, a time when you wonder what life is all about, and that's the feeling we put on the album. It was a break from the norm. When you do a solo album everyone expects you to produce half a dozen hit singles. Here I just did what I felt was right."

== Recording ==
With Roy Thomas Baker producing, the sessions for the album took place at Crystal Studios in Hollywood. In the Kerrang! interview, Anderson revealed that he'd deliberately set up an atmosphere with studio props, much as he had done for the Tales from Topographic Oceans sessions twelve years previously. "I went out and bought a camel - a stuffed camel. And we had a little Christmas tree in the corner... plenty of grog! On the last three days we didn't sleep - because you can't release a Christmas album in January and we had to get it ready in time."

Most of the album was synthesizer-based, working from keyboards played by Mike Marshall and Fairlight CMI programmed and played by Rhett Lawrence. Further contributors to the album included several gospel choirs (Sandra Crouch & Friends, the choir of the Calvary Baptist Church in Santa Monica, and the Inspirational Choir from the First Seventh Day Adventist Church) and two children's choirs (the Reach for the Stars Singers and the choir from Millikan Middle School in Sherman Oaks). Guitars were played by Anderson's Yes bandmate Trevor Rabin and by Elliot Easton of The Cars. Drums were played by Frankie Banali of Quiet Riot and Ric Parnell (Atomic Rooster/Spinal Tap), with Paulinho da Costa contributing percussion. Anderson's daughter Jade, aged five years old at the time, sang the version of "Jingle Bells" which closed out the album.

Although 3 Ships is generally considered to be a Christmas music album, on the original track listing only five of its songs were traditional Christmas songs or carols, outnumbered by seven Anderson originals (one of which had been co-written with Vangelis but held back from a Jon & Vangelis project), many of which had only tenuous Christmas connections. The album style itself also varied from song to song, moving between gospel pop, soul, synth pop, New Age and electronic experimental pop with heavy use of Fairlight CMI.

== Releases ==
The 'Holiday Card Pack, Jon Anderson Special Edition' came with a personal autograph from Anderson, as well as a set of five Christmas cards. Each card displayed an image of an Anderson watercolour painting.

3 Ships was reissued on compact disc in 2007. This remastered '22nd Anniversary Edition' contains all of the album's original songs, plus five bonus tracks, two of which were previously unreleased. Unlike most CDs that feature bonus tracks, these are not tacked onto the end but are interspersed throughout, leading to a new listening experience for people familiar with the vinyl sequence.

In 2019, Japanese label Highland Project released Three Ships - The Complete Sessions, a three-CD set featuring multiple takes of the album tracks. It was reissued by Marshall Records on 14 June 2023.

== Reception ==
Professional ratings
Review scores
Source	Rating
Allmusic	2/5 stars
Sounds	1/5 stars

The album received only a single star from Sounds reviewer Hugh Fielder, who called it a "soppy retreat from realism". Reviewing the album for AllMusic, Dave Connolly wrote: "This is an oddity: a Christmas album incognito. Save a red and green stripe on the back cover, the outside packaging is conspicuously devoid of the usual holiday trappings, leaving the astute person to deduce from the track listing Three Ships' true intent. [...] The Christmas songs are processed with synthesizers, overwhelming Anderson's voice most of the time, and the end result is a disappointing and superficial collection of Christmas classics (including one of the lamest versions of "O Holy Night" on record). As with In the City of Angels, also recorded in Hollywood, fans would do well to let Three Ships sail by."

== Track listing ==
All songs are written by Jon Anderson, except where noted

Side one
No.	Title	Writer(s)	Length
1.	"Save All Your Love"		1:25
2.	"Easier Said Than Done"	Vangelis	3:14
3.	"Three Ships"	Traditional	3:44
4.	"Forest Of Fire"		3:34
5.	"Ding Dong Merrily On High"	Traditional	3:36
6.	"Save All Your Love (Reprise)"		2:20

Side two
No.	Title	Writer(s)	Length
7.	"The Holly And The Ivy"	Traditional	3:07
8.	"Day Of Days"		3:37
9.	"2000 Years"		0:54
10.	"Where Were You?"		3:57
11.	"O Holy Night"	Traditional	4:25
12.	"How It Hits You"		5:13
13.	"Jingle Bells"	Traditional	0:30

Bonus tracks on 2007 reissue
No.	Title	Writer(s)	Length
1.	"Give Hope"	Michael Walden	4:37
5.	"Candle Song"	Vangelis	3:32
8.	"Hurry Home"		6:47
12.	"Ave Verum"		3:26
18.	"Ray Of Hope"	Don Black, Mike Marshall	6:11

== Personnel ==
- Jon Anderson - vocals
- "Beyond War Philharmonic" – orchestration
- Paul Cheng - concert master
- Conducted by Bob Esty
- Gospel Choir - Calvary Baptist Church, Santa Monica
- Inspirational Choir, courtesy of Pastor Robert de France Jr.
- William Bryant II - choir director
- "Reach for the Stars Singers" - Children's Choir
- Marta Woodhull - choir director
- Children's Choir on "Give Hope - "Millikan Middle School, Sherman Oaks, CA
- Leo Krubsack - choir director
- Sandra Crouch & Friends - directed by Andre and Sandra Crouch & Gary Lanier
- Sandra Crouch - special guest Duet Vocals on "Oh Holy Night"
- Jade Anderson - additional vocals on "Jingle Bells"
- Rhett 'Pepsi' Lawrence - Fairlight CMI
- Mike Marshall - keyboards, orchestration
- Trevor Rabin and Elliot Easton - guitar
- Frankie Banali & Ric Parnell - drums & percussion
- Paulinho da Costa - percussion
- Novi Novog - electric viola

== Production ==
- Produced by Roy Thomas Baker for RTB Audio Visual Productions, U.S.A.
- Engineered & Mixed by George Tutko
- Assistant Engineering by Jim McMahon
- Additional Mixing by Brad Gilderman
- Recorded at Crystal Studios, Hollywood CA.
- Production Co-ordination by Bob Keasler, assisted by Freddie Henderson & Jem Scott
- Re-Issue Engineering & Mastering by Mike Pietrini
- Executive Producer: Rob Ayling for Voiceprint Group of Companies
- Musical Arrangements by Bob Esty except track 18, Mike Marshall GB
- Art Direction and Design by KOSH & Larson
- Cartography by Bob Blakeman

== Charts ==
Chart (1985)	Peak position
Dutch Albums (Album Top 100)	66
US Billboard 200	166
