= Richie Castellano =

American musician & engineer (born 1980)

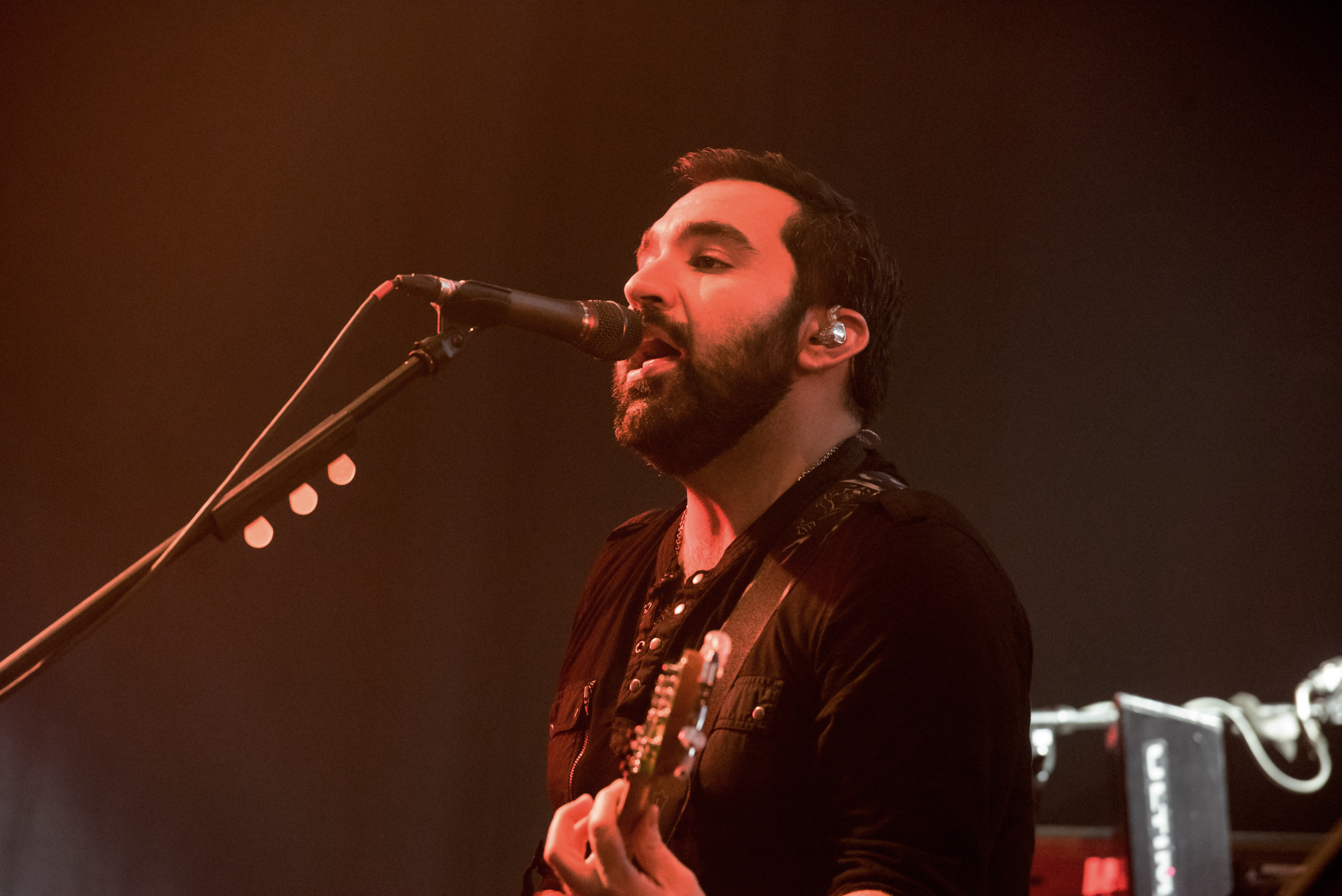
- Castellano performing with Blue Öyster Cult in 2016.

Background information
- Born: February 7, 1980 (age 46); Brooklyn, New York, US
- Genres: Hard rock, heavy metal, psychedelic rock
- Occupations: Musician, singer-songwriter
- Instruments: Bass guitar, guitar, keyboards, vocals
- Years active: 2003–present
- Member of: Blue Öyster Cult
- Website: richiecastellano.com

Richard Castellano (born February 7, 1980) is an American musician and sound engineer. He is a member of the band Blue Öyster Cult and records and tours with Jon Anderson and the Band Geeks.

== Biography ==
=== Early years: 1980–1998 ===
A fifth generation musician, Richie Castellano was born in Brooklyn, New York City on February 7, 1980. The Castellano family moved to Staten Island in 1985. He began to study guitar at the age of seven. Among his early musical influences were Elvis Presley, Jerry Lee Lewis, Little Richard, Buddy Holly, and Ritchie Valens. By the early 1990s, influenced by the Beatles, he began songwriting, as well as recording on a 16-track reel-to-reel studio he had assembled in the basement of his house. Later influences included Yes, Genesis, and Emerson, Lake and Palmer. He also cites the music of Queen as an important influence on the development of his musical style.

After spending his first semester of high school at Port Richmond, Staten Island, Castellano transferred to Curtis High School in Staten Island, where he joined the Curtis High School Guitar Ensemble. At that time, Castellano met Ron "Bumblefoot" Thal, who became one of his most important mentors. In 1997, inspired in part by Thal's 1995 debut solo album The Adventures of Bumblefoot, Castellano recorded a 13-song solo concept album. This album, entitled Alone in My Basement, was surprisingly successful, selling out of its initial pressing within one month of its release. He won two songwriting awards for one of the songs from Alone in My Basement. The album was also acclaimed in EQ magazine for the unusual methods employed in its recording and production. He won a competition to write a song for his high school graduation. Castellano graduated from Curtis High School in 1998.

=== College and graduate school: 1998–2002 ===
Castellano enrolled in the Conservatory of Music at the State University of New York at Purchase in 1998. He majored in Studio Production, studying the then-new practice of digital recording. From 1999–2001, he produced and engineered Regina Spektor's debut album, 11:11, which was self-released on CD on July 9, 2001. During the summer of 2000, Castellano studied advanced digital recording techniques and audio engineering at Wave Studio in Staten Island, under the instruction of Ron Thal. Castellano assisted Thal with the production of his album, Uncool. That year, he also began his association with Blue Öyster Cult as a substitute Front of House engineer. Also around this time, he and one of his professors, Grammy Award-nominated producer Joe Ferry, were involved in a band, "Richie & the Pocketrockets". This band released one album, entitled Touch of Blue: The Blues Tribute to the Grateful Dead, on CMH Records on August 21, 2001.

Upon earning his bachelor's degree in music production, he embarked began post-graduate studies under Ferry, while also working as a staff producer at Ferry's record label, Larchmont Records. Castellano earned his master's degree in music from the SUNY Purchase Conservatory of Music in December 2002.

=== Blue Öyster Cult: 2003–present ===
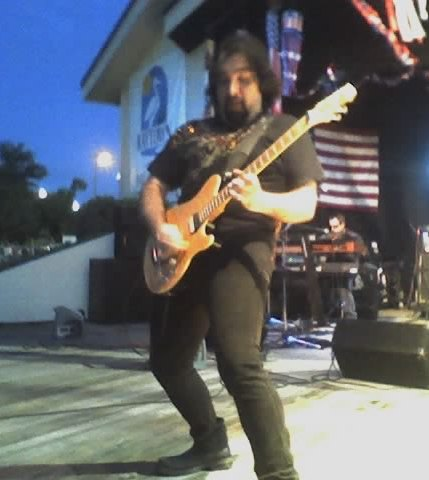
Richie Castellano, member of Blue Öyster Cult, at a live performance in Baytown, Texas, July 3, 2010

In December 2003, Castellano served as sound engineer on Blue Öyster Cult's 13-city tour of Germany. He first performed with Blue Öyster Cult as bass guitarist in Las Vegas, Nevada on September 18, 2004, shortly after Danny Miranda left the band. He remained in that position until early 2007, when original member Allen Lanier retired from the band. At that time, Castellano filled the position of rhythm guitar and keyboards, while Danny Miranda returned briefly to fill the position of bassist. By April 2007, the bass guitar position was filled by Rudy Sarzo on a semi-permanent basis.

== Awards and recognition ==
- 1996: Berklee College of Music soloist award
- 1998: first place award in the songwriting competition of the Songwriters Hall of Fame
- 1998: third place award in the "World of Expression" Scholarship Program competition of the Bertelsmann Foundation (now known as the Random House Creative Writing Competition)

== Other work ==
In addition to performing with Blue Öyster Cult, he also plays guitar in the band Morning Starlett with his ex-wife Ann Marie. Morning Starlett released an eponymous album in 2012. He frequently works with Andy Ascolese, and released an album of power pop titled 2 Part Invention in 2005.

He also works in his family's music store (Castellano's House of Music) in Staten Island on a private basis. In 2011, Castellano had a viral video hit with his rendition of Queen's "Bohemian Rhapsody" where he performed all of the vocals and instrumentals. He has also done a similar project with The Beatles Abbey Road Medley.

=== Band Geeks ===
In May 2014, Castellano began a podcast called Band Geek with Richie Castellano. Band Geek started as an audio-only podcast but morphed into a YouTube band featuring a revolving group of his friends and special guests, collectively known as The Band Geeks. The Band Geeks cover classic rock and pop songs, and have often featured songs by the band Yes. This brought them to the attention of founding Yes singer Jon Anderson which led to Anderson and the Band Geeks, including Castellano, along with drummer Andy Ascolese, guitarists Andy Graziano and Rob Schmoll, and keyboardists Christopher Clark and Robert Kipp, touring the US together in 2023 playing a set of classic Yes songs.

They toured together again in 2024 & 2025, with Matt Beck filling in for Graziano for one leg, and Jon Anderson released a new album True in August 2024 on Frontiers Music featuring the Band Geeks. Richie Castellano is credited as co-producer, co-writer, engineer and mixer on the album.

== Equipment ==
Castellano currently uses guitars manufactured by Ernie Ball Music Man. Chief among these are the Albert Lee Signature, Axis, Axis Super Sport, Silhouette Special, and Sterling models. He also uses Line 6 Helix and Variax products and an Audio-Technica Wireless system.

When playing bass with the Band Geeks, he primarily uses Rickenbacker 4001 basses.
