= Change We Must =

Studio album by Jon Anderson
- Released: 17 October 1994
- Recorded: 1993–1994
- Genre: Classical, rock, world, choral
- Label: EMI; Angel Records (US)
- Producer: Jon Anderson; Tim Handley

Jon Anderson chronology
Deseo (1994)	Change We Must (1994)	Angels Embrace (1995)

Singles from Change We Must
- 1. "Change We Must" Released: 3 October 1994; 2. "Candle Song" Released: 1994

Professional ratings
Review scores
Source	Rating
Allmusic	3.5/5 stars

Change We Must is the seventh solo album by Yes lead singer Jon Anderson, released in 1994. The album contains new material and orchestral arrangements of songs from Anderson's past.

== Track listing ==
No.	Title	Writer(s)	Length
1.	"State of Independence"	Jon Anderson, Vangelis	5:37
2.	"Shaker Loops"	Anderson (lyrics), John Adams (music)	5:31
3.	"Hearts"	Chris Squire, Anderson, Trevor Rabin	5:03
4.	"Alive & Well"	David Tolley, Anderson	4:43
5.	"The Kiss"	Anderson, Vangelis	3:51
6.	"Chagall Duet"	Anderson	3:31
7.	"Run On, Jon"	Tolley, Anderson	2:46
8.	"Candle Song"	Anderson, Vangelis	3:36
9.	"A View from the Coppice"	Tolley, Anderson	2:46
10.	"Hurry Home"	Anderson	6:52
11.	"Under the Sun"	Anderson	5:01
12.	"Change We Must"	Anderson, Vangelis	5:39

"State of Independence": original version on the Jon & Vangelis album The Friends of Mr Cairo (1981).
"Hearts": original version on the Yes album 90125 (1983).
"Hurry Home" and "Under the Sun": original versions on In the City of Angels (1988), the latter as "It's on Fire".
"Candle Song" (as "Anyone Can Light a Candle"): original version on the Jon & Vangelis album Page of Life (1991).
"Change We Must": later added to the alternate US release of Page of Life (1998).

== Personnel ==
- Jon Anderson - vocals and orchestrations
- Matt Clifford - keyboards, orchestration (7, 9)
- Opio Singers Choir (1–3, 10, 12)
- Nick Ingram - orchestration (1, 4, 12)
- Ian Thomas - drums (3)
- Milton McDonald - guitar (3, 12)
- Steve Pearce - bass (3, 11, 12)
- Toby Alington - synths (3)
- Gwendolyn Mok - piano (4, 7, 9)
- Geoffrey Alexander - orchestration (5, 6, 8, 10, 11)
- Sandrine Piau - vocals (6)
- Tim Handley - orchestration (7)
- Jade Anderson - vocals (8)
- Christopher Warren-Green, Rosie Furness, Roger Chase, Steve Trees, Jonathan Williams - String Quartet (8)
- Skaila Kanga - harp (8)
- Nadya - Sun Chant (11)
