= Angels Embrace =

Studio album by Jon Anderson
- Released: September 1995
- Recorded: 1995
- Genre: New age
- Length: 48:22
- Label: Higher Octave Music
- Producer: Jon Anderson

Jon Anderson chronology
Change We Must (1994)	Angels Embrace (1995)	Toltec (1996)

Professional ratings
Review scores
Source	Rating
Allmusic	4/5 stars

Angels Embrace is the eighth studio album by the English singer, songwriter, and musician Jon Anderson, It was released in September 1995 by Higher Octave Music.

== Background ==
Following the release of his previous album, Change We Must, in October 1994, Anderson took a break after touring with the rock band Yes before he started to write and record music for a new album. By 1995, Anderson had met his future wife Jane Luttenberger who became a significant inspiration to his life and the music he would write since the mid-1990s. A photograph of the couple is included on the album's liner notes.

Angels Embrace was recorded in 1995, with Anderson as the producer, and mixed at Opio Studios in Pacific Palisades, Los Angeles. In a departure from his previous work, the album sees Anderson explore instrumental and ambient music. He had wanted to compose a "peaceful work" for some time, which "plays quietly and embraces the whole room", and used several pieces of musical ideas that he had written and collected over the years as inspiration. Anderson named the album after a pastel painting by English artist Jack Shalatain titled "The Angels Embrace". His daughters Deborah and Jade provided additional vocals, and additional keyboards are performed by Steve Katz and Keith Heffner.

== Track listing ==
All music is composed by Jon Anderson

No.	Title	Length
1.	"Myo Maya"	0:50
2.	"New Eire Land"	14:44
3.	"Angels Embrace"	6:40
4.	"Cloudsinging"	5:37
5.	"Prayersong"	4:47
6.	"Naturemusic"	11:44
7.	"Midnight Cello"	4:00

== Personnel ==
Credits adapted from the album's sleeve notes.

Music

- Jon Anderson – vocals, keyboards (except "New Eire Land" and "Prayersong")
- Deborah Anderson – vocals on "Angels Embrace"
- Jade Anderson – vocals on "Prayersong"
- Steve Katz – keyboards on "New Eire Land"
- Keith Heffner – keyboards on "Prayersong"

Production

- Jon Anderson – production
- Ric Wilson – mastering
- John Laraio – mastering assistant
- Tal Herzberg – mastering assistant
- Matt Marshall – executive producer
- Dan Selene – executive producer
- Suki Sir Tansey – creative direction
- Geoff Gans – art direction
- V Photo/Vitor Martins – photography
