= Toltec (album) =

Studio album by Jon Anderson
- Released: 1 July 1996
- Recorded: 1989–90
- Genre: New age
- Length: 47:19
- Label: High Street//Windham Hill Records
- Producer: Jon Anderson

Jon Anderson chronology
Angels Embrace (1995)	Toltec (1996)	Lost Tapes of Opio (1996)

Professional ratings
Review scores
Source	Rating
Allmusic	3.5/5 stars

Toltec is the ninth solo album by Yes lead singer Jon Anderson, released in 1996. Musically, it is progressive rock with elements of new age, world music, electronic, and jazz. Anderson provided the vocals, wrote, arranged, and produced the work.

== Background ==
The concept of the album was initially conceived by Anderson in the late '80s while reading the book The Power of Silence by Carlos Castaneda, and attending a reception for the displacement of native Hopi people in California. As a result of that gathering, he was able to later connect with Chief Ernie Longwalker who reluctantly allowed for his spoken word stories to be recorded for use on the project, which revolved around Jon's songs inspired by the stories of indigenous people, including the mysterious Toltecs.

While Anderson was signed to Geffen Records, the album was never released beyond a promo album called The Power of Silence which they released in 1992 (only on cassette). Following legal threats preventing the use of Castaneda's title (Jon had initially wanted "to marry them together, to sell the record and the novel"), and with Geffen Records unhappy with the perceived lack of commercial potential (and Anderson's refusal to edit it for radio), the album's rights were sold to Windham Hill, who eventually released it – essentially the same music, with added narration – as Toltec in 1996.

The 1996 Toltec release is made up of 13 cuts divided into three parts. It tells the tale of the Toltec, a Native American concept of a group of people who have been all over the Earth, existing within different cultures throughout the centuries. They are described in the album liner as "Creators of the circles of power, color, perfume, and music healing domes."

== Track listing ==
- Part I
  - 1. "The Book Opens" (4:59)
  - 2. "Quick Words (Talk- Talk)" (Anderson, Perez) (2:54)
  - 3. "Shall We Play the Game" (3:45)
  - 4. "Semati Siyonpme" (3:16)
- Part II
  - 5. "Good Day Morning" (2:02)
  - 6. "Leap into the Inconceivable" (3:53)
  - 7. "Song of Home" (1:11)
  - 8. "Building Bridges" (Anderson, del Signore) (5:55)
  - 9. "Sound and Color" (4:01)
  - 10. "Longwalker Speaks" (2:48)
- Part III
  - 11. "Maazo Maazo" (1:23)
  - 12. "Enter Ye the Mystery School" (7:54)
  - 13. "Ave Verum" (Mozart) (3:08)

All music written by Jon Anderson; except where stated above

== Personnel ==
Jon Anderson: all vocals

With

- Keith Heffner - keyboards, orchestration
- Luis Perez - percussion
- Eduardo del Signore - bass
- Freddy Ramos - guitars
- Otmaro Ruiz - solo keyboards
- Charles Bisharat - violin
- Patricia Hood - harp
- Paul Haney - saxophone
- Salo Loyo - keyboards on 13
- Deborah Anderson - harmonic vocals
- Nina Swan - vocals
- Maria E Del Ray - vocals
- Daniel Navarro - vocals
- David Eric Lowen - vocals
