= Lost Tapes of Opio =

Studio album by Jon Anderson
- Released: 1996
- Length: 79:32
- Label: Opio Foundation

Jon Anderson chronology
Toltec (1996)	Lost Tapes of Opio (1996)	The Promise Ring (1997)

Lost Tapes of Opio is the tenth solo album by Yes lead singer Jon Anderson, released in 1996.

== Background ==
Lost Tapes of Opio was originally a music cassette-only release in 1996 of material recorded in the late 1980s and early 1990s. It was released through Anderson's Opio Foundation with proceeds going to UNICEF.

The album was re-released as The Lost Tapes of Opio on CD by Voiceprint as part of The Lost Tapes series in 2006 with a different track order.

== Track listing ==
All music performed by Jon Anderson

2006 reissue
No.	Title	Length
1.	"Release"	27:24
2.	"Homage To Sun Ra"	9:36
3.	"Miraval"	8:21
4.	"Eireland"	7:40
5.	"Opio Symphony"	8:55
6.	"Longwalker Speaks"	17:36
