= Shine (Mike Oldfield song) =

Single by Mike Oldfield
- Released: 28 April 1986
- Genre: Pop rock Progressive rock
- Length: 5:08
- Label: Virgin Records
- Songwriter(s): Mike Oldfield; Jon Anderson
- Producer(s): Mike Oldfield

Mike Oldfield singles chronology
"Pictures in the Dark" (1985)	"Shine" (1986)	"In High Places" (1987)

"Shine" is a single by musician Mike Oldfield, released in 1986. "Shine" features Jon Anderson on vocals.

== Music video ==
The music video for "Shine" features use of computer graphics, such as a computer generated game of chess. Oldfield plays a Gibson SG guitar in the video. The video is available on the Elements - The Best of Mike Oldfield DVD.

== Track listing ==
1. "Shine" (Extended version) – 5:08
2. "The Path" – 3:31

== Charts ==
Chart (1986)	Peak position
German Singles Chart	31
UK Singles Chart	100
