= True (Jon Anderson album) =

Studio album by Jon Anderson and The Band Geeks
- Released: 23 August 2024
- Length: 58:22
- Label: Frontiers
- Producers: Jon Anderson; Richie Castellano

Jon Anderson chronology
1000 Hands: Chapter One (2019)	True (2024)

Singles from True
- 1. "Shine On" Released: 13 June 2024; 2. "True Messenger" Released: 29 July 2024

Alternative cover
- Cover for 2026 Deluxe Edition vinyl release

True is the sixteenth studio album by former Yes lead singer Jon Anderson, his first studio collaboration with The Band Geeks, released on 23 August 2024 by Frontiers Records.

== Background ==
In March 2024, Anderson announced that a new tour, titled "Yes: Epics, Classics and More" would begin with the Band Geeks as a backing band, who had previously been on tour with Anderson. Alongside this announcement, Band Geeks member and co-producer Richie Castellano also announced that they were working on a new studio album. The label Frontier Records described it as "a collection of songs that harkens back to Yes’s classic 70’s sounds as well as to their latter-day success with the album 90125." Two singles and music videos were released in promotion of the album, "Shine On" on 13 June 2024 and "True Messenger" on 29 July 2024.

About the album, Anderson told Classic Rock Magazine: "I’ve got the Yes that I wanted" and called the album "like a gift from the heavens" and the recording process "one of the most wonderful experiences of my life."

In 2026, it was announced that a deluxe Record Store Day double vinyl edition of the album will be released in April 2026, featuring a new alternate cover, and an exclusive alternate version of "Build Me an Ocean."

== Reception ==
Chris Roberts of Louder Sound was positive towards the album, giving it a 4/5. They described it as his best work since 2016's Invention of Knowledge, hugging "the corners of Seventies (as opposed to Eighties) Yes with just the right balance of mimicry and mutability". The main highlight was the longest track, "Once Upon a Dream" which they stated was reminiscent of the Yes album Fragile.

== Track listing ==
True track listing
No.	Title	Writer(s)	Length
1.	"True Messenger"	Jon Anderson; Jamie Dunlap; Richie Castellano	5:50
2.	"Shine On"	Anderson; Castellano	4:18
3.	"Counties and Countries"	Anderson	9:51
4.	"Build Me an Ocean"	Anderson; Jimmy Haun	3:20
5.	"Still a Friend"	Anderson; Castellano; Andy Ascolese; Christopher Clark	5:02
6.	"Make It Right"	Anderson; Jonathan Elias; Castellano	6:07
7.	"Realization Part Two"	Anderson; Haun	3:33
8.	"Once Upon a Dream"	Anderson; Elias; Castellano; Ascolese; Clark	16:32
9.	"Thank God"	Anderson; Robin Crow	3:49
Total length:			58:22

== Personnel ==
Jon Anderson and the Band Geeks

- Jon Anderson – lead vocals, harp, production, musical arrangement
- Richie Castellano – bass, guitar, keyboards, vocals, production, musical arrangement, engineering, mixing
- Andy Ascolese – drums, percussion, keyboards, vocals, associate production, musical arrangement, engineering
- Andy Graziano – guitar, vocals
- Christopher Clark – keyboards, musical arrangement
- Robert Kipp – Hammond organ, vocals
- Ann Marie Nacchio – additional vocals

Additional contributors

- Sam Stauff – mastering
- Deborah Anderson – album artwork, Jon Anderson photo
- Claudia Morini – album layout
- Rob Schmoll – The Band Geeks photo
- Jimmy Haun – co-writer on "Build Me an Ocean" and "Realization Part Two"
- Robin Crow – co-writer on "Thank God"
- Stan Decker - cover design (alternate cover: deluxe edition)

== Chart performance ==
Chart (2024)	Peak position
Switzerland (Schweizer Hitparade)	43
