= Jon Anderson =

English musician and singer (born 1944)

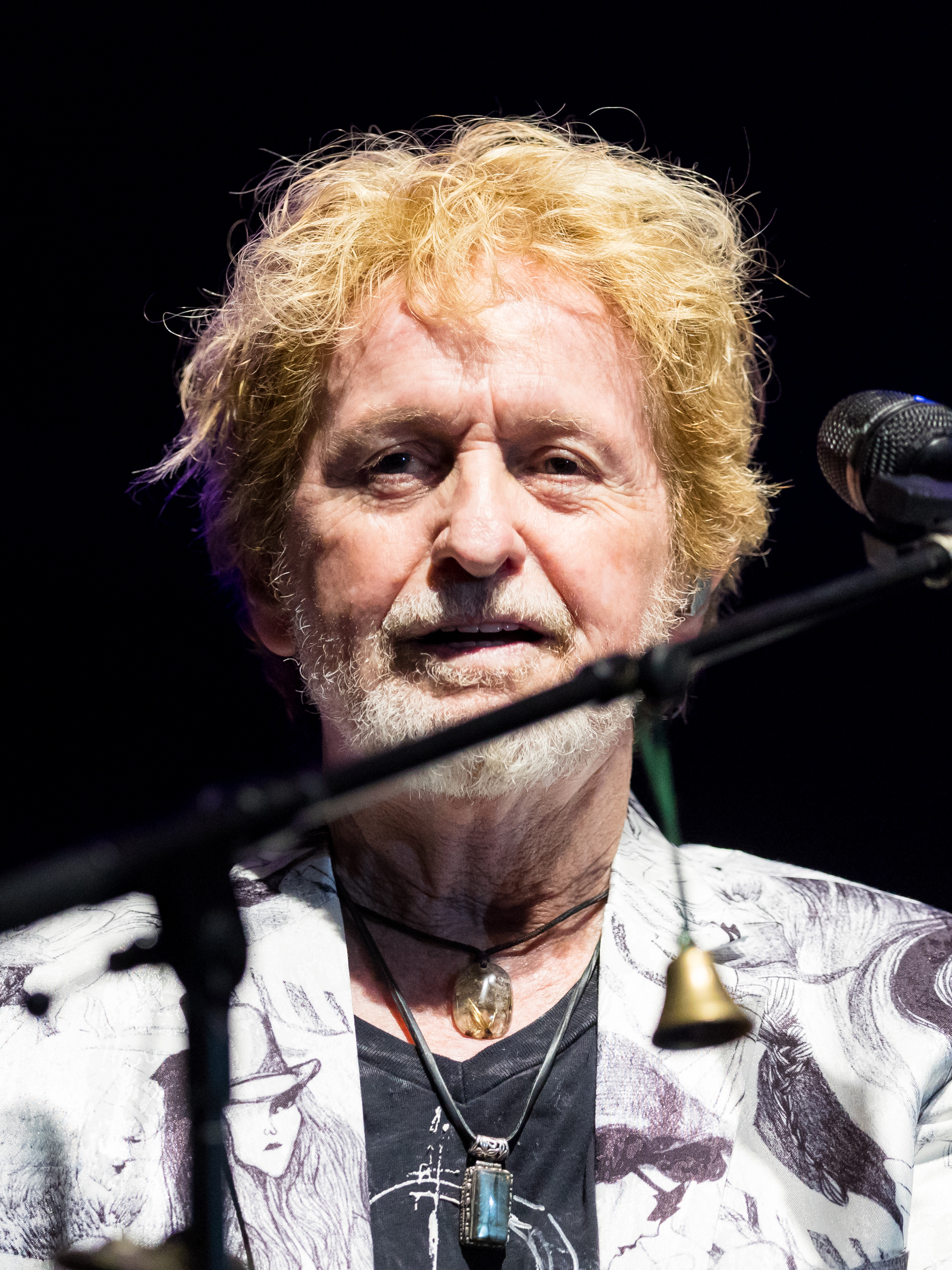
- Anderson in 2018
- Born: John Roy Anderson; 25 October 1944 (age 81); Accrington, Lancashire, England
- Citizenship: United Kingdom; United States (since 2009)
- Occupations: Singer; songwriter; musician
- Years active: 1963–present
- Spouses: Jennifer Baker (m. 1969; div. 1995) Jane Luttenberger (m. 1997)
- Children: 3, including Deborah and Jade
- Musical career
- Genres: Progressive rock; symphonic rock; pop rock; new-age
- Instruments: Vocals; guitar; percussion
- Works: Discography; tours
- Labels: Atlantic; Polydor; Elektra; Columbia; Angel; Windham Hill; Higher Octave; Eagle; Cleopatra; Voiceprint; Wounded Bird; EMI; Blue Élan
- Formerly of: The Warriors; Mabel Greer's Toyshop; Yes; Jon and Vangelis; Anderson Bruford Wakeman Howe; Yes Featuring Jon Anderson, Trevor Rabin, Rick Wakeman
- Website: jonanderson.com

Jon Anderson (born John Roy Anderson, 25 October 1944) (Note: Anderson dropped the "h" from his name around late 1970, prior to the release of The Yes Album (1971).) is an English singer, songwriter, and musician who co-founded the progressive rock band Yes with bassist Chris Squire in 1968 and rose to prominence as their lead vocalist. The band pioneered progressive rock in the 1970s, particularly with their critically-acclaimed albums The Yes Album, Fragile (both 1971) and Close to the Edge (1972) which display Anderson's role in crafting the group's sound as one of the main songwriters and lyricists. Known for his high tenor vocal style, Anderson was a member of Yes across three tenures: from 1968 to 1980, 1983 to 1988, and 1990 to 2008.

Born and raised in Accrington in northern England, Anderson gave up manual labour in the early 1960s in favour of singing in The Warriors with his brother. He moved to London and after several unsuccessful singles as a solo artist and co-formed Yes with Squire. Anderson left the band in 1980 due to growing internal friction and continued his solo career, which he had started in 1976 with his debut album, Olias of Sunhillow. He went on to collaborate with other musicians, including Greek keyboardist and composer Vangelis as Jon and Vangelis, Roine Stolt as Anderson/Stolt, Jean-Luc Ponty as the Anderson Ponty Band, and The Band Geeks as Jon Anderson and the Band Geeks, with whom he has toured repeatedly and released two albums in recent years. He has appeared on albums by King Crimson, Toto, Lawrence Gowan, Tangerine Dream, Iron Butterfly, Milton Nascimento, Battles, Mike Oldfield and Kitaro. Anderson was a member of the offshoot Yes groups Anderson Bruford Wakeman Howe and Yes Featuring Jon Anderson, Trevor Rabin, Rick Wakeman.

In 2009, Anderson acquired American citizenship. In 2017, he was inducted into the Rock and Roll Hall of Fame as a member of Yes. In 2026, Loudwire ranked him as the greatest progressive rock singer of all time.

== Early life ==
John Roy Anderson was born on 25 October 1944 in Accrington, Lancashire, England. His father, Albert, was from Glasgow, Scotland, and served in the army's entertainment division before later working as a salesman; his mother, Kathleen, was of Irish and French ancestry and worked in a local cotton mill. Together, his parents competed in ballroom dancing, winning several county championship awards. Anderson noted that he was named after both the Scottish name Royston and an English touring vocalist who performed under the stage name John Roy the Melody Boy. He grew up on Norfolk Street as the third youngest of four children, alongside his brothers, Tony and Stuart, and sister, Joy. Tony would later become a vocalist himself, introducing Jon to early rock and roll records. During his youth, Anderson became an avid fan of musical artists such as Elvis Presley, Eddie Cochran, the Everly Brothers, and Jon Hendricks.

Anderson attended St. John's School, where he regularly organised daily football matches during lunch breaks. He was not a strong academic student and later recalled that he "was always getting into trouble for messing around and singing too loud". At age ten, he made a tentative start to a musical career by playing the washboard in Little John's Skiffle Group, which performed songs by Lonnie Donegan at local church youth clubs. At age fifteen, Anderson left school following his father's illness and took up employment as a farmhand, a lorry driver transporting bricks, and a milkman to help support his family. A keen football enthusiast, he attempted to pursue an athletic career with Accrington Stanley F.C., but at 5 feet 5 inches (1.65 m) tall, he was turned down due to his slight build and constitution. Despite the rejection, he remained a lifelong supporter of the club, serving as a ball boy and mascot for a year, and was later named an official club ambassador.

== Career ==
=== 1962–1968: The Warriors and first solo singles ===
Anderson had no particular desire to become a singer at first until his brother, Tony, took up singing and joined the Warriors, a local group also known as the Electric Warriors. After one of the backing vocalists left the group, Anderson filled the vacancy, finding music more enjoyable and a better financial option than manual labour. The group performed mainly cover songs from several artists, including the Beatles, performing across Lancashire and the club circuit in Germany for over a year. "We wanted to be Beatles. That’s all we ever wanted to be in the '60s", he recalled. Anderson's vocals are heard on their first two recorded songs, "You Came Along" and "Don't Make Me Blue", released in 1965. After the Warriors split in Germany in late 1967, the band returned to England while Anderson stayed behind, briefly becoming the singer in the Gentle Party, a band from Bolton who were residing in Germany.

After returning to London in March 1968, Anderson met Jack Barrie, owner of the La Chasse drinking club in Soho who had befriended the rest of the Warriors after they relocated to the city. Lacking independent funds or accommodation, Anderson and former Warriors keyboardist Brian Chatton stayed with Barrie. Anderson earned his keep by working at La Chasse; during this time he spoke to Paul Korda, a producer for EMI Records who hired him to sing on several demos. During the search for material to record, Barrie contacted Elton John and Bernie Taupin of DJM Records to put some music together, though Anderson disliked most of it. Meanwhile, Anderson travelled to the Netherlands to join Les Cruches, a band he met in London, but promptly returned upon learning that his demos were to be released as singles by Parlophone Records.

Parlophone management chose to market him under the pseudonym Hans Christian, selecting the name to capitalise on his slight stature and whimsical, storytelling lyrical delivery. Released under this name, the first single, an orchestrated cover of "Never My Love" by the Association with "All of the Time" on its B-side, received a positive reception from New Musical Express and Chris Welch for Melody Maker, who wrote in March 1968, "A blockbuster of a hit from a young fairy tale teller with an emotion packed voice." Anderson's second single, "(The Autobiography of) Mississippi Hobo"/"Sonata of Love", was released two months later; neither song was successful.

Barrie and Korda then took Anderson to see local group the Gun, and together they rehearsed for well-received gigs at the UFO and Marquee clubs in London—the latter as an opener for the Who, which led to several gig offers. However, the rest of the group believed they could reach success without a lead vocalist and dismissed Anderson.

=== 1968–1980: Forming Yes and start of solo career ===
In May 1968, Barrie introduced Anderson to Chris Squire, bassist of the London-based rock band Mabel Greer's Toyshop, which had previously included guitarist Peter Banks. The two talked, and found they shared common musical interests such as Simon & Garfunkel and the idea of vocal harmonies. In the following days, they developed "Sweetness", a song later recorded on the first Yes album. Anderson found himself on lead vocals for some Mabel Greer gigs afterwards, and talks of the formation of a new, full-time band developed. In June 1968, Anderson and Squire hired Bill Bruford to replace founding drummer Robert Hagger, and Anderson secured £500 from John Roberts, owner of a paper manufacturer, to rent space in The Lucky Horseshoe cafe in Soho so a new, full-time band could rehearse. At their conclusion a month later, a line-up of Anderson, Squire, Bruford, Banks, who replaced a departing Clive Bayley, and keyboardist Tony Kaye, who Anderson met in Leicester four years prior, was formed. They then renamed themselves Yes, originally Banks' idea. Anderson's first gig with Yes followed on 3 August 1968 at a youth camp in East Mersea in Essex.

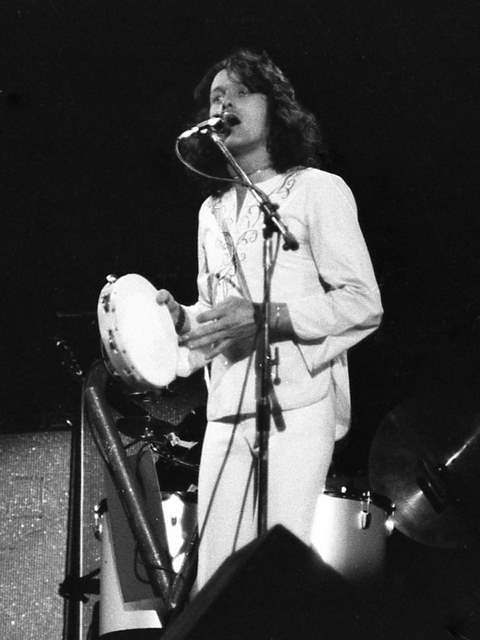
Anderson performing with Yes in 1973

Although the band had no formal leader, Anderson served as its main motivating force in their early days, doing most of the hustling for gigs and originating most of their songs. He played a key role in initiating their more ambitious artistic ideas, serving as the main instigator of some of the band's more popular songs, including "Close to the Edge", "The Gates of Delirium", and "Awaken", and the concept behind their double concept album Tales from Topographic Oceans (1973).

Despite his initial lack of instrumental skills, Anderson was strongly involved in the selection of successive Yes members chosen for their musicality – guitarist Steve Howe (who replaced Banks in 1970), Kaye's successive replacements Rick Wakeman and Patrick Moraz, and drummer Alan White, who replaced Bruford in 1972.

Ambitious and nicknamed "Napoleon" by the rest of the band, Anderson was also fond of sonic and psychological creative experiments, and in so doing contributed to occasionally conflicted relationships within the band and with management. An example of this was his original desire to record Tales from Topographic Oceans in the middle of the woods. When the band voted to record in a studio, he decided to arrange hay and animal cut-outs all over the floor to create atmosphere. Anderson described the album's supporting tour as one of the low points of his career, as a portion of the audience and the band were unhappy with the album.

In addition to Yes, Anderson appeared as a guest singer on Lizard by King Crimson for "Prince Rupert Awakes", the first part of their 23-minute title track recorded in 1970. He was chosen for the part as the desired vocal range was unattainable by the group's then-lead vocalist, Gordon Haskell. In 1974, Anderson co-wrote "Pearly Gates" with Iron Butterfly drummer Ron Bushy on the band's album Scorching Beauty. This was followed by his first collaboration with Greek musician Vangelis, singing on "So Long Ago, So Clear", the last section of "Heaven and Hell Part I" on his 1975 album Heaven and Hell.

In August 1975, Yes took an extended break for each member to release a studio album. Anderson chose a concept album, Olias of Sunhillow, about an alien race of four tribes and their journey to a new planet as theirs is under threat from destruction. Olias, one of the three main characters, builds the Moorglade Mover, an aircraft formed of living organisms to transport everyone to their new home. Anderson gained inspiration from science fiction and fantasy novels, works by J. R. R. Tolkien, The Initiation of the World by Vera Stanley Alder, and the art work from Yes's Fragile. He recorded the music from his garage in six months, learning to play all instruments himself, including several types of drum, stringed, and percussion instruments associated with world or ethnic music, which took up as many as 120 track recordings in its original form. Anderson found the experience a valuable one in learning about music. Atlantic Records released the album in July 1976, and it reached number 8 in the UK and number 47 in the US.

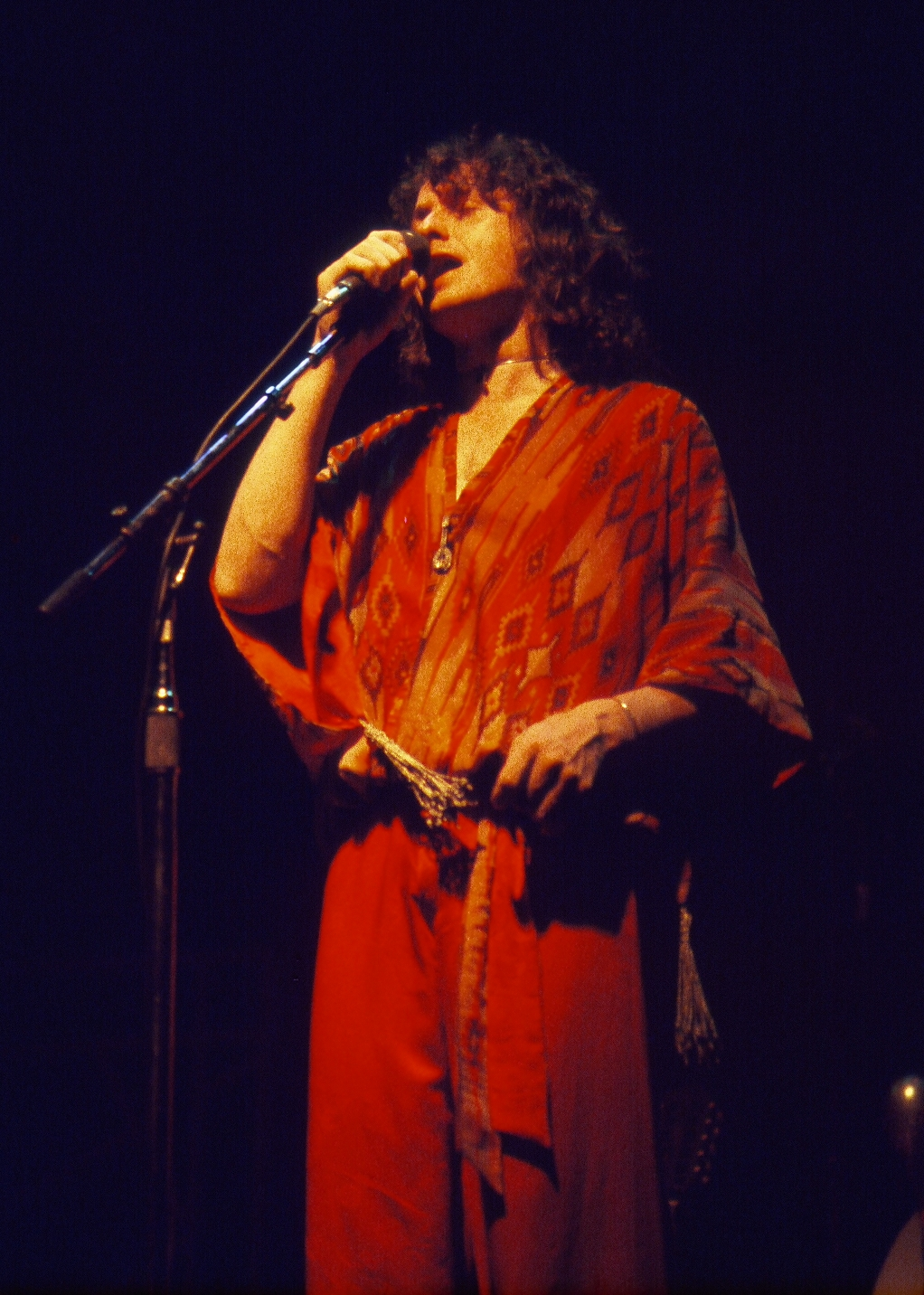
Anderson singing at a Yes concert in 1977

Between 1976 and 1979, Anderson recorded Going for the One and Tormato with Yes and completed their supporting tours. In February 1979, he reconvened with Vangelis to start recording as Jon and Vangelis. Their first album, Short Stories, was recorded in a matter of weeks with minimal preconceived ideas which Anderson found to be a refreshing experience. Released in January 1980, Short Stories went to number 4 in the UK. In 1979, Anderson played the harp on "Flamants Roses" on Vangelis's album Opéra sauvage and wrote music for Ursprung, an act for a three-part modern ballet named Underground Rumours performed by the Scottish Ballet company, that also featured music by Ian Anderson. The choreographer was Royston Maldoom and the lighting designer was David Hersey.

In October 1979, Anderson travelled to Paris to record a new Yes album with producer Roy Thomas Baker. Progress staggered early into the sessions following disputes over the band's musical direction. Material prepared by Anderson and Wakeman was not met with enthusiasm by their bandmates, who started to put down tracks without them. These appeared on the Yes album Drama. "Very quickly", recalled Anderson, "the mood changed from enthusiasm to frustration and then complete confusion". Matters failed to improve when they reconvened in February 1980, and Anderson and Wakeman left in the following month. They were replaced by Trevor Horn and Geoffrey Downes of the Buggles.

=== 1980–1990: Solo career, return to Yes, and ABWH ===
Anderson acquired Jannis Zographos as his new manager, who also handled Vangelis. He continued his collaboration with Vangelis by singing on "Suffocation" and "See You Later" for Vangelis's album See You Later, released in 1980. After he secured a recording deal with Virgin Records, Anderson retreated to southern France to write material for a solo album. His proposals for albums based on the Russian-French artist Marc Chagall and the book A True Fairy Tale by Daphne Charters were not enthusiastically received by the label's management, who lost interest and requested their advance back. Anderson spent much of 1980 recording a collection of songs for Song of Seven with a group of musicians he named the New Life Band, which Atlantic agreed to release. When it was put out in November, it reached number 38 in the UK and number 143 in the US. Anderson completed his first solo tour with the band, performing a mix of solo and Yes material in Germany and England.

In 1981, Anderson played on Wakeman's concept album 1984 and released his second album with Vangelis in July 1981, The Friends of Mr Cairo. The album produced two singles, "I'll Find My Way Home" and "State of Independence"; the latter became a hit for Donna Summer in 1982. The album was also notable for the title track, which was an ode to classic Hollywood gangster films of the 1930s and 1940s with voice impressions of Humphrey Bogart, Peter Lorre and James Stewart which paid homage to The Maltese Falcon (1941). In 1982, Anderson released Animation, and in 1983 appeared on "In High Places" from Crises by Mike Oldfield.

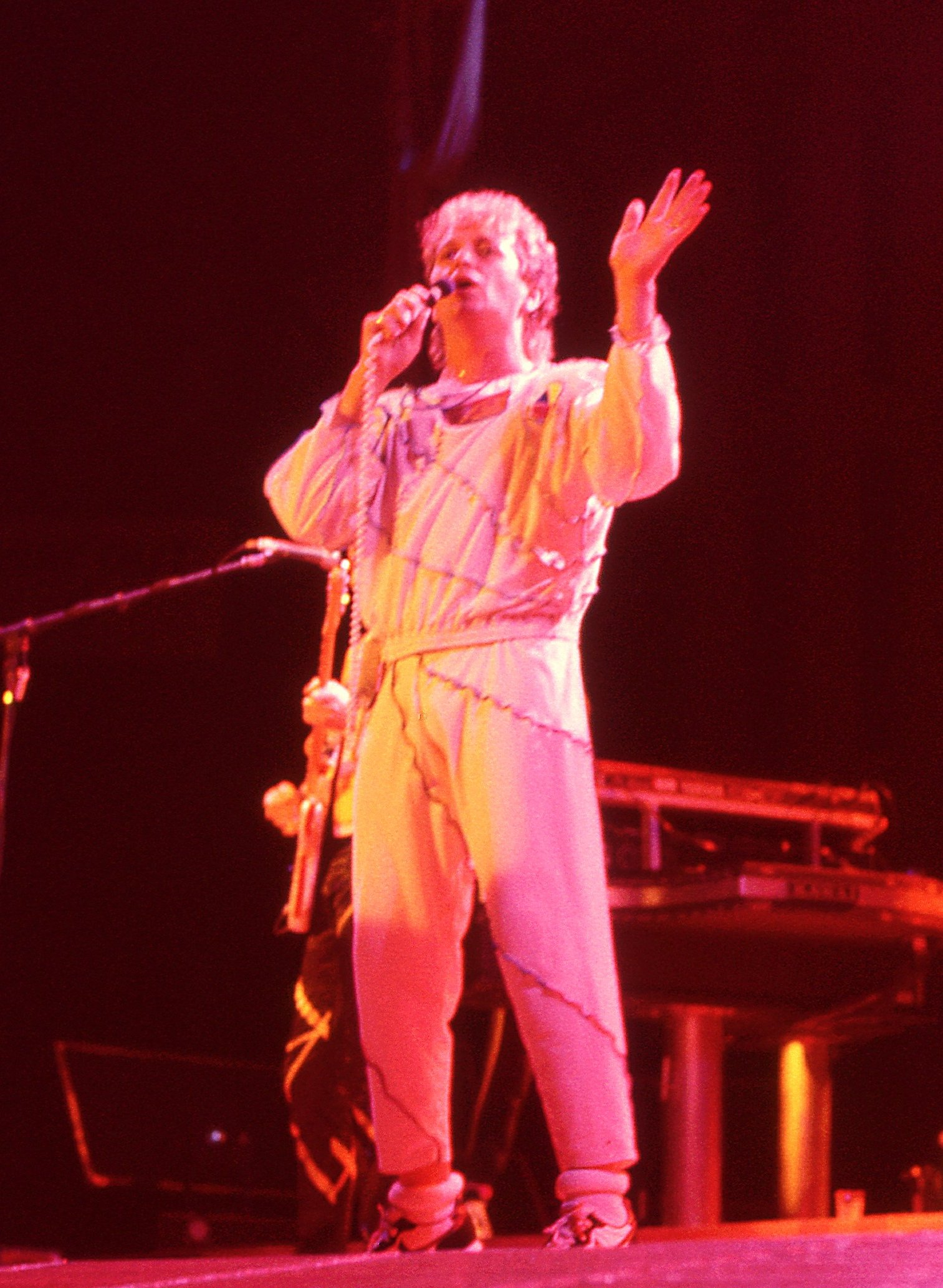
Anderson performing with Yes at NEC Arena, Birminghan, 1984

In early 1983, Anderson was contacted by Phil Carson of Atlantic Records who suggested that he hear a tape of demos that Cinema, a new group formed of Squire, White, Kaye, and guitarist Trevor Rabin, with Horn as producer, had developed for a new album. Anderson was invited to sing lead vocals on the album and join the group, which he accepted. Cinema then changed their name to Yes, and 90125, released in November 1983, became Yes's best selling album. In 1987, the group released its successor, Big Generator.

Anderson appeared on the song "Cage of Freedom" from the 1984 soundtrack for a re-release of the Fritz Lang film Metropolis. In 1985, his song "This Time It Was Really Right" was featured on the soundtrack for St. Elmo's Fire. He also sang "Silver Train" and "Christie" on the soundtrack to Scream for Help by John Paul Jones. Along with Tangerine Dream, he appeared on the song "Loved by the Sun" for Legend (1985). Anderson released a Christmas-themed solo album, 3 Ships (1985). Biggles: Adventures in Time (1986) features two songs sung by Anderson. In early 1986, Anderson recorded a single with Mike Oldfield (Shine) and later shot a video with him in Barbados.

During 1986, Anderson recorded some demo tracks that would later be reworked. He and Vangelis also started writing new songs and recording demos for another album. Though the album was not made, they performed live together on 6 November 1986. The last three years of the 1980s saw Anderson sing on "Moonlight Desires" on Gowan's album Great Dirty World (1987), record his fifth solo album In the City of Angels, sing on "Stop Loving You" on the Toto album The Seventh One (1988), and record an album that would later be released as The Lost Tapes of Opio. He also sang on the songs "Within the Lost World" and "Far Far Cry" for the Jonathan Elias album Requiem for the Americas.

In 1988, after Yes' Big Generator tour, Anderson reunited with Bruford, Wakeman, and Howe to form Anderson Bruford Wakeman Howe (ABWH) with bassist Tony Levin. They recorded one album and supported it with a world tour.

=== 1990–2004: Return to Yes and solo career ===
In 1990, after the ABWH tour, a series of business deals caused ABWH to reunite with the then-current members of Yes, who had been out of the public eye while searching for a new lead singer. The resulting eight-man band assumed the name Yes, and the album Union (1991) was assembled from various pieces of an in-progress second ABWH album, as well as recordings that Yes had been working on without Anderson. A successful tour followed.

Jon and Vangelis released their fourth album, Page of Life, in 1991. In 1992 Anderson appeared on Kitaro's album Dream, adding both lyrics and vocals to three songs: "Lady of Dreams", "Island of Life" and "Agreement". He also toured South America with a band that included his daughters, Deborah and Jade. He appeared on the song "Along the Amazon" which he co-wrote for violinist Charlie Bisharat's album of the same name. In 1993, Anderson started work on Change We Must, his seventh solo album, featuring a mixture of original and orchestrated versions of songs he had sung with Yes, Vangelis, and his solo career. It was released in October 1994 on EMI and Angel Records.

From 1992 to 1994, Anderson recorded the Yes album Talk (1994). "Walls", written by Rabin and Roger Hodgson, reached number 24 on the Billboard Hot Mainstream Rock Tracks chart. In July 1994, Anderson released Deseo, a solo album of Latino-influenced music. There were plans to release a live album called The Best of South America, but it was not released due to management issues (though some copies were already released by Yes Magazine). Anderson sang on the 7th Level children's video game Tuneland. Also, his son Damion released a single called "Close 2 the Hype", which featured him and Jon on vocals.

In August 1995, Anderson relocated to San Luis Obispo in California. His eighth studio album, Angels Embrace, was released on 26 September 1995 on the Higher Octave Music label. His first primarily instrumental album, it displays Anderson performing ambient music with assistance from Steve Katz and Keith Heffner on keyboards and his two daughters on vocals. Anderson followed this with Toltec, a concept album released on 30 January 1996 on Windham Hill Records that tells the story of Toltec, "a Native American concept of a group of people who have been all over the Earth, existing within different cultures throughout the centuries". The album was meant to be released in 1993 as The Power of Silence, minus the sound effects and narration added later, but it was cancelled following issues with Geffen Records.

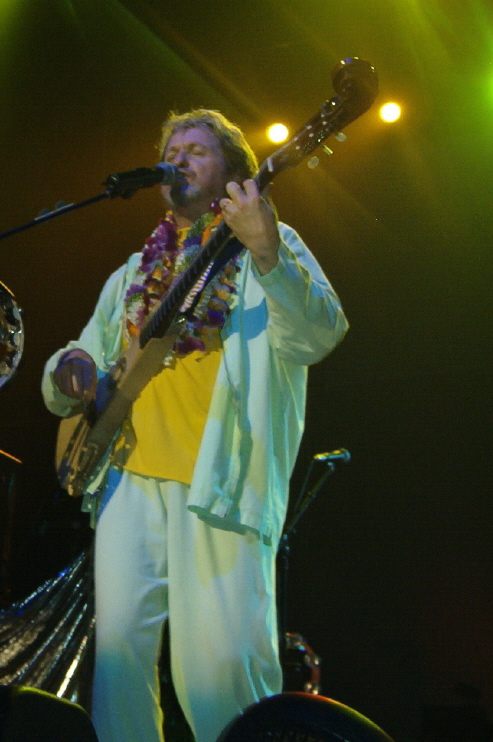
Anderson performing in 2003

In the mid-1990s, Anderson had planned to tour and record in China, but abandoned the idea in favour of writing and recording new music with Yes after Wakeman and Howe rejoined the band. Anderson's move to San Luis Obispo influenced the decision for Yes to record their three-night stint at the town's Fremont Theater in March 1996, as part of their subsequent studio and live album sets Keys to Ascension and Keys to Ascension 2, released in 1996 and 1997, respectively. On 12 May 1996, Anderson performed an 80-minute set at a Mother's Day concert in Paso Robles, California, formed of Yes, Jon and Vangelis, and solo material. Anderson's next album, Lost Tapes of Opio, was released in 1996 on audio cassette through his Opio Foundation. Formed of songs recorded since the 1980s, proceeds from the release were donated to UNICEF.

In 1997, Anderson released the Celtic-influenced The Promise Ring with his second wife, Jane Luttenburger, sharing vocals. The album is a live recording of music performed by them and members of the Froggin' Peach Orchestra, the name given to a group of 28 musicians based in the Frog & Peach pub in San Luis Obispo. During their honeymoon in 1997, Anderson and Luttenburger recorded Earthmotherearth which was followed by The More You Know in 1998, recorded in Paris with French artist Francis Jocky. It was Anderson's last studio release for 13 years. Anderson appeared on the song "The Only Thing I Need" by act 4Him in 1999; it was recorded for Streams, a multi-group album. Steve Howe's tribute album Portraits of Bob Dylan also featured a cover of the Bob Dylan song "Sad Eyed Lady of the Lowlands" with Anderson's vocals. He also recorded with the Fellowship on their album In Elven Lands, inspired by the works of J. R. R. Tolkien.

In 2000, Anderson had started work on a sequel album to Olias of Sunhillow named The Songs of Zamran: Son of Olias. Development on the project slowed since then; in 2011, he reasoned the delay as it spans up to three hours in length, of which he has written the majority of it, but needs additional time "to figure out how to recreate it correctly". Anderson expressed a wish of putting out an interactive album with "an app that allows people to go on a journey, [to] choose a new journey every time they open it up, and hear it in a different way every time".

In September 2004, Yes wrapped their 35th Anniversary Tour and they entered a four-and-a-half year hiatus. In the tour's last week, Anderson was suffering from stress, asthma, bronchitis, and exhaustion.

=== 2004–2009: Solo projects and departure from Yes ===
In 2004, Anderson performed with the Contemporary Youth Orchestra of Cleveland, later returning for a second collaborative performance in 2010. A concert captured in Washington, D.C., and broadcast over satellite radio was released on the live DVD Tour of the Universe in 2005. This home video project coincided with the release of his solo single "State of Independence".

In 2006, Anderson performed the Yes track "Roundabout" as a guest vocalist with the Trans-Siberian Orchestra. Later that year, he and Rick Wakeman embarked on the Live in Concert Tour across the UK. In 2007, Anderson contributed lead vocals to the album Culture of Ascent by progressive rock group Glass Hammer and appeared as part of a guest vocal ensemble on the track "Repentance" from Dream Theater's studio album Systematic Chaos. He also toured as a guest performer with the Paul Green School of Rock Music AllStars project that same year.

Anderson released From Me to You in 2008, an ambient album overlaying his vocals with birdsong, which was subsequently added to his The Lost Tapes archival series. He co-wrote and provided vocals for the track "Sadness of Flowing" on Peter Machajdík's album Namah, and contributed guest vocals to a remastered edition of keyboardist Tommy Zvoncheck's album ZKG.

In May 2008, during preparation for a world tour celebrating the 40th anniversary of Yes, Anderson suffered a severe asthma attack and was diagnosed with acute respiratory failure. Following a period of medical recovery, he regained sufficient strength to resume live performances, launching an acoustic solo European tour titled Have Guitar, Will Travel in early 2009. This was followed by a North American leg that continued through 2010. Later that year, a sample of Anderson's vocals from the 1983 Mike Oldfield track "In High Places" was prominently featured on the song "Dark Fantasy" by hip-hop artist Kanye West.

=== 2010–2022: Anderson Ponty Band, Anderson/Stolt, and ARW ===
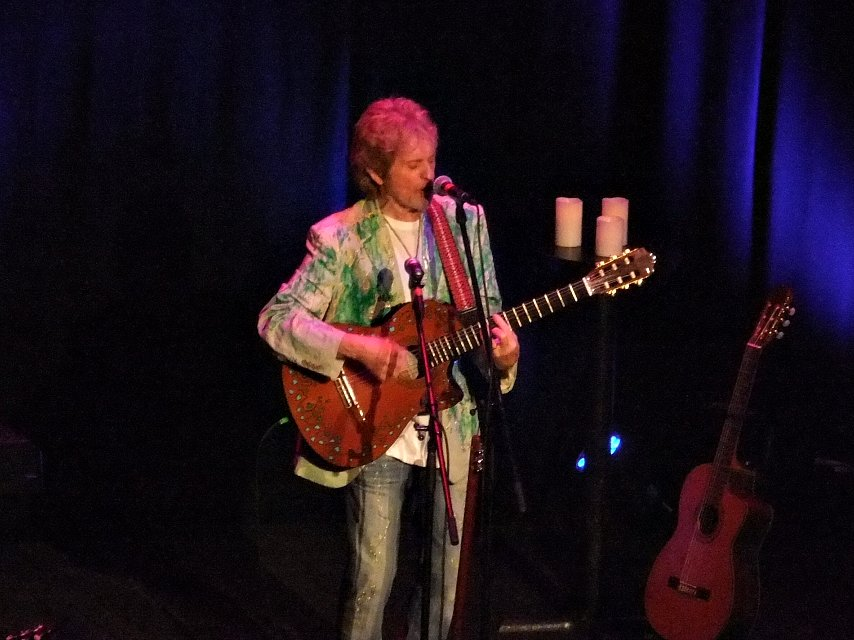
Anderson performing during a solo concert tour in 2012

In 2010, Anderson and Wakeman resumed touring as a duo and released their first collaborative studio album, The Living Tree. In June 2011, Anderson released his fourteenth solo album, Survival & Other Stories. For this project, he invited musicians to submit instrumental tracks online, which he then used as the creative foundation for his new material. In October 2011, he released a single-track EP titled Open, a 20-minute conceptual piece featuring orchestral arrangements and a choir. Anderson continued working on a sequel to his 1976 solo debut Olias of Sunhillow, announcing in January 2013 that the long-term multimedia project was to be titled The Songs of Zamran: Son of Olias.

Anderson performed solo concerts globally throughout 2013, visiting Australia, North America, Europe, and Iceland, before launching an expansive tour of North and South America in February 2014. Later that year, he partnered with former Counting Crows bassist Matt Malley to release the charity single "The Family Circle".

From 2014 to 2016, Anderson collaborated with French violinist and composer Jean-Luc Ponty in the Anderson Ponty Band. The project was announced in July 2014 with the intention of reworking classic material from both of their respective careers alongside new compositions. Ponty noted that the goal was "to keep our musical personalities and the original sounds, but the production will be more modern." Supported by a touring backing band, they released the live CD/DVD package Better Late Than Never in 2015. The accompanying concert film was subsequently syndicated nationally across American Public Television stations.

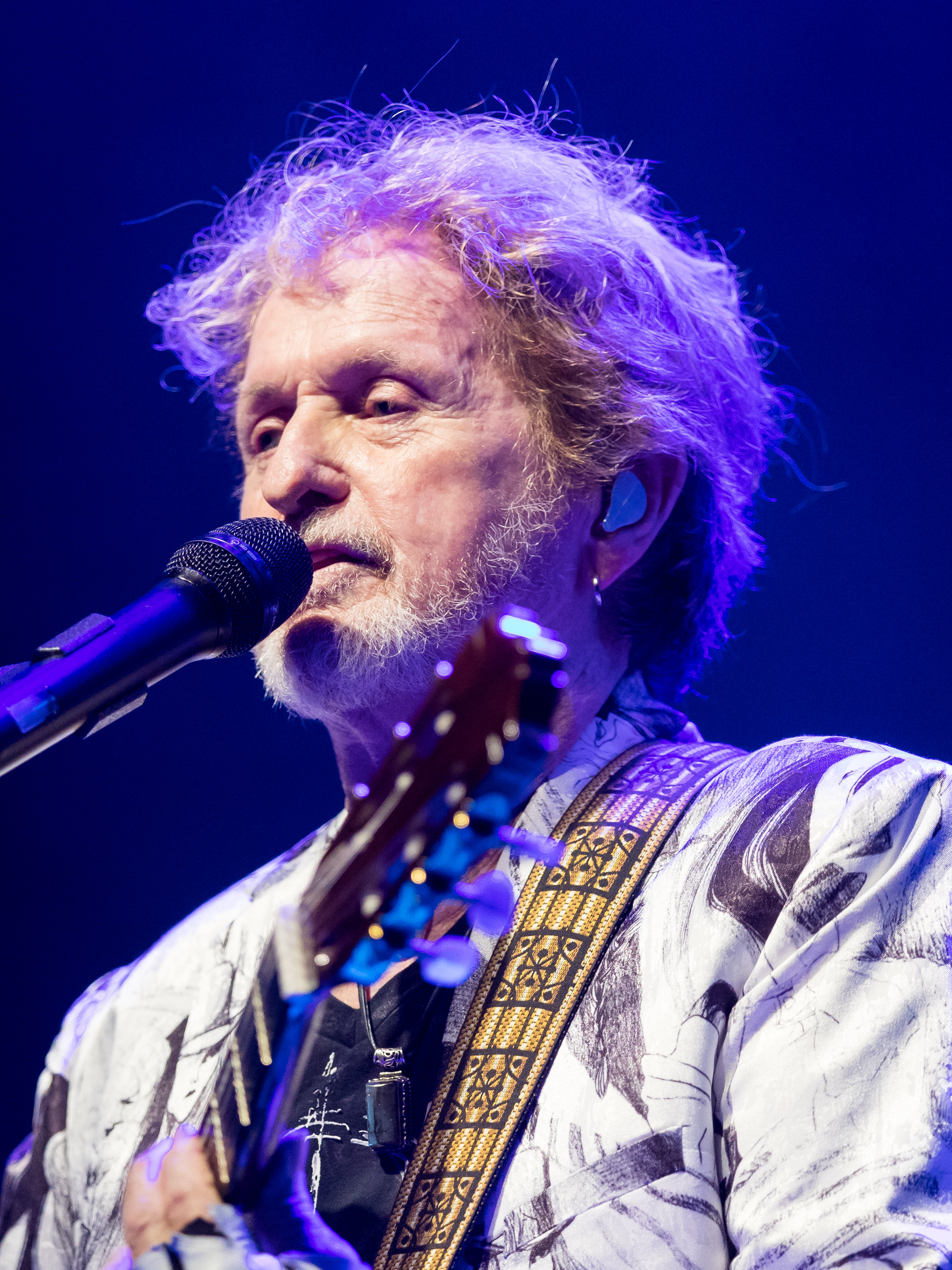
Anderson performing with Yes featuring ARW in 2018

Parallel to his work with Ponty, Anderson collaborated with Swedish guitarist and songwriter Roine Stolt. Their studio album, Invention of Knowledge, was released in June 2016 and featured several members of Stolt's progressive rock band the Flower Kings as backing musicians. In January 2016, Anderson and composer Sean McKee demonstrated the music software Lumit Audio at the NAMM convention, performing an original track titled "You Are The Computer" using a prototype MIDI guitar.

In January 2016, Anderson announced the formation of Anderson Rabin Wakeman (ARW), a new group alongside former Yes bandmates Trevor Rabin and Rick Wakeman, with the intention of touring and recording. Later renamed Yes Featuring Jon Anderson, Trevor Rabin, Rick Wakeman, the band completed two world tours. Although the trio attempted to record a studio album of original material, the project was abandoned, and a live album, Live at the Apollo, was released in September 2018 instead. The group officially disbanded in 2020.

In April 2017, Anderson was inducted into the Rock and Roll Hall of Fame as a member of Yes, performing "Roundabout" and "Owner of a Lonely Heart" at the induction ceremony. In March 2019, he released his fifteenth solo studio album, 1000 Hands: Chapter One. Having initiated tracking for the project nearly thirty years prior, Anderson titled the album in reference to the numerous guest musicians involved, including Steve Howe, Jean-Luc Ponty, Chick Corea, and Billy Cobham. To promote the release, he premiered a standalone single and music video titled "Love Is Everything" in December 2018.

During this period, Anderson and McKee began work on an unreleased collaborative double concept album titled Jeremiah and the Magister Ludi, tracking sessions with guest musicians Carl Broemel, John Hermann, and Jordan Rudess. In 2019, the duo established an educational partnership with Columbia College Chicago's Audio Arts and Acoustics program, engaging students in creating 5.1 surround sound mixes for the project. On 30 June 2021, Anderson announced an 11-city tour of US theaters backed by the Paul Green Rock Academy.

=== 2023–present: The Band Geeks ===
In 2023, Anderson teamed with a new backing band, The Band Geeks, a covers group originally formed in 2014 by American musician, producer, and bassist Richie Castellano of Blue Öyster Cult. Anderson was introduced to the group by an employee at SiriusXM Radio, and was impressed after watching videos of their accurate performances of Yes music. Having wanted to record an album of long-form Yes epics, Anderson contacted Castellano about the possibility of a collaboration. They completed an initial 12-date US tour in May 2023, performing a selection of Yes songs to gauge the feasibility of the concept. Following the tour's success, the ensemble embarked on an extended second US tour from May to August 2024, incorporating new original material alongside classic tracks.

Prior to the 2024 tour, Anderson announced they had recorded a collaborative studio album inspired by the 1970s and 1980s eras of Yes. The resulting album, True, was released on 23 August 2024 through Frontiers Music. The promotional singles "Shine On" and "True Messenger" were released with accompanying music videos to support the launch.

The band followed the release with a live CD/DVD package, Live – Perpetual Change, on 14 March 2025, which captured performances from their debut 2023 tour. The release was ranked by Goldmine as one of the top progressive rock albums of 2025. Between April and October 2026, the group completed an expansive concert tour encompassing the US alongside their first UK and European dates. Anderson subsequently announced plans for a follow-up studio album with the group in 2027, tentatively titled Giving is Living.

== Musical style ==
It is a commonly held misconception that Anderson sings falsetto, a vocal technique which naturally produces high, airy notes by using only the ligamentous edges of the vocal cords; however, this is not the case. Anderson's normal singing/speaking voice is naturally above the tenor range. In a 2008 interview with the Pittsburgh Post-Gazette, Anderson stated, "I'm an alto tenor and I can sing certain high notes, but I could never sing falsetto, so I go and hit them high."

According to Anderson's web site, he is also responsible for most of the mystically themed lyrics and concepts which are part of many Yes releases. The lyrics are frequently inspired by various books Anderson has enjoyed, from Tolstoy's War and Peace to Hermann Hesse's Siddhartha. A footnote in Paramahansa Yogananda's Autobiography of a Yogi inspired an entire double album Tales from Topographic Oceans (1973). Recurring themes include "environmentalism, pacifism and sun worship." Anderson has said elsewhere that his lyrics are designed less with literary intent than to add tone and texture to the music, and his works often make use of assonances and emphasis on open vowels to this effect.

== Personal life ==
=== Family ===
Anderson met his first wife, Jennifer Baker, at the Speakeasy club in London. While Yes biographer Dan Hedges states the couple married on 22 December 1969, Anderson contradicted this in a February 1971 interview, stating they were not married but remained in a relationship. The marriage grew increasingly strained over the following decades as the couple grew apart, leading to their quiet separation and eventual divorce in 1995. They had three children together, including musicians Deborah and Jade. Anderson later acknowledged that his nomadic lifestyle as a touring musician compounded domestic difficulties and contributed to a challenging upbringing for his children. He was also the godfather of Ariane Forster, better known as Ari Up, the lead singer of the post-punk band the Slits.

In 1997, Anderson married American-born Jane Luttenberger after four years together; Yes drummer Alan White served as his best man at the wedding ceremony.

=== Health and spiritual beliefs ===
Anderson was a smoker during the 1960s and 1970s, and briefly experimented with cocaine before adopting a healthier lifestyle. Although he and most members of Yes became vegetarians in the mid-1970s, Anderson later stated that he eventually moved away from a strict vegetarian diet.

Since the 1980s, Anderson has practiced a backstage pre-show ritual of meditating in a tent surrounded by crystals and dreamcatchers. His religious and spiritual beliefs are syncretic, incorporating a wide array of global influences. In the late 1980s, Anderson was introduced to Hawaiian spiritual leader Flora Nomi, a teacher of the 19th-century Indian mystic Ramakrishna. Nomi introduced him to meditation, and he became a follower of her teachings after undergoing what he described as a spiritual awakening. Following Nomi's death in 1992, she was succeeded by Audrey Kitagawa, who became his spiritual guide. Anderson has credited Kitagawa's guidance with helping him reconnect with his children.

In May 2008, during rehearsals for Yes's 40th anniversary tour, Anderson suffered a severe asthma attack and was diagnosed with acute respiratory failure. His doctors advised him to rest for at least six months, forcing the cancellation of the tour. Yes subsequently chose to tour later that year with a new lineup, permanently replacing Anderson with Benoît David, who was later succeeded by Jon Davison in 2012. Following his recovery, Anderson resumed touring as a solo performer in 2009.

=== Interests and citizenship ===
Anderson became an American citizen in 2009. He is a long-standing supporter of Manchester United F.C.

On 14 May 2021, the asteroid 48886 Jonanderson, discovered by astronomers with the OCA-DLR Asteroid Survey in France, was named in his honour.

== Discography ==
Solo albums

- Olias of Sunhillow (1976)
- Song of Seven (1980)
- Animation (1982)
- 3 Ships (1985)
- In the City of Angels (1988)
- Deseo (1994)
- Change We Must (1994)
- Angels Embrace (1995)
- Toltec (1996)
- Lost Tapes of Opio (1996)
- The Promise Ring (1997)
- Earth Mother Earth (1997)
- The More You Know (1998)
- Survival & Other Stories (2011)
- 1000 Hands: Chapter One (2019)
- True (2024)

== Notes and references ==
Notes

Sources

- Griffin, Mark J. T. (1997). Vangelis: The Unknown Man – An Unauthorised Biography. Lulu. ISBN 978-0-95231-872-9.
- Hedges, Dan (1982). Yes: An Authorized Biography. Sidgwick & Jackson. ISBN 978-0-283-98751-9.
- Morse, Tim (1996). Yesstories: "Yes" in Their Own Words. St Martin's Press. ISBN 978-0-312-14453-1.
- Welch, Chris (2008). Close to the Edge – The Story of Yes. Omnibus Press. ISBN 978-1-84772-132-7.
