= Animation (Jon Anderson album) =

Studio album by Jon Anderson
- Released: May 1982
- Recorded: 1981–1982
- Genre: Progressive rock; pop rock; Synth-pop
- Length: 41:32
- Label: Polydor (UK); Atlantic (US and Canada); Opio Media
- Producer: Jon Anderson; Neil Kernon; Tony Visconti

Jon Anderson chronology
Song of Seven (1980)	Animation (1982)	3 Ships (1985)

Singles from Animation
- 1. "Surrender" Released: April 1982; 2. "All in a Matter of Time" Released: November 1982; 3. "Boundaries" Released: 1982 (NL)

Professional ratings
Review scores
Source	Rating
Allmusic	2/5 stars

Animation is the third solo album by Jon Anderson, a founder-member and former lead singer of Yes. It was released in May 1982. In June 2021, a "Remastered and Expanded Edition" was released by Esoteric Recordings.

== Overview ==
Animation was recorded during a busy time for Anderson when he was collaborating with Vangelis and Mike Oldfield and exploring new age and electropop.

As with the previous album Song of Seven, several well-known musicians were involved in Animation, including Simon Phillips, David Sancious, Jack Bruce and Morris Pert. Anderson also worked with Ian Wallace on this album, who played drums in his band The Warriors in the 1960s before Yes.

The album was produced by producer Neil Kernon who had worked with acts such as Daryl Hall and John Oates and was released on vinyl but no CD version was published until 2006, when a limited edition CD re-release of the album with two bonus tracks was issued by Opio Media. Unfortunately the CD was not made from the original masters but from a worn copy of the vinyl, which led to complaints from purchasers. The song "All God's Children" was produced by producer Tony Visconti (who had worked with more mainstream British acts such as David Bowie and T. Rex)

The album was promoted with a world tour on which Anderson performed songs from the album as well as several Yes classics, mostly in medley form. A follow-up album entitled Chagall was recorded but not released.

One track on the album, "Boundaries", later appeared on other works by Anderson (entitled "O'er" on The Promise Ring) and Yes (entitled "Somehow, Someday" on Open Your Eyes). "Surrender" and "All in a Matter of Time" were released as singles.

== Track listing ==
Side one
No.	Title	Length
1.	"Olympia"	4:58
2.	"Animation"	9:07
3.	"Surrender"	3:53
4.	"All in a Matter of Time"	3:06

Side two
No.	Title	Length
5.	"Unlearning (The Dividing Line)"	4:56
6.	"Boundaries"	3:20
7.	"Pressure Point"	4:36
8.	"Much Better Reason"	4:27
9.	"All Gods Children"	4:25

2021 bonus tracks
No.	Title	Length
1.	"Spider" (previously unreleased)	11:40
2.	"The Spell (Demo)"	2:51

== Personnel ==
- Jon Anderson – vocals, acoustic guitar
- Clem Clempson – guitars
- Stefano Cerri – electric bass guitar
- Chris Rainbow – vocals
- David Sancious – keyboards
- Simon Phillips – drums and percussion

Additional musicians

- Dave Lawson – keyboards
- Ronnie Leahy – keyboards
- Blue Weaver – keyboards
- Delmay String Quartet – strings
- Billy Kristian – guitar
- John Giblin – bass guitar
- Jack Bruce – bass guitar
- Ian Wallace – drums
- Brother James – percussion
- Morris Pert – percussion
- Brazil Idiots – Brazilian percussion

== Charts ==
Chart (1982)	Peak position
Australian Albums (Kent Music Report)	97
Dutch Albums (Album Top 100)	3
UK Albums (OCC)	43
US Billboard 200	176

Chart (2021)	Peak position
Scottish Albums (OCC)	67
UK Independent Albums (OCC)	22
