= Olias of Sunhillow =

Studio album by Jon Anderson
- Released: 29 June 1976 (US); 9 July 1976 (UK)
- Recorded: 1975–1976
- Studios: Mobile studio at Long Grove in Seer Green, Buckinghamshire
- Genres: Progressive rock, psychedelic folk, world music
- Length: 43.49
- Label: Atlantic
- Producer: Jon Anderson

Jon Anderson chronology
Olias of Sunhillow (1976)	Song of Seven (1980)

Singles from Olias of Sunhillow
- 1. "Flight of the Moorglade" Released: 26 August 1976

Olias of Sunhillow is the debut studio album by English singer-songwriter Jon Anderson, released in the United Kingdom on 9 July 1976 by Atlantic Records. When the progressive rock band Yes took a break in activity in August 1975 for each member to record a solo album, Anderson, having established himself as their frontman, decided upon a concept album that tells the story of four tribes of an alien race and their journey to a new planet after their home is threatened by a volcanic eruption. Olias, a magician, builds a spacecraft named the Moorglade Mover and is helped by fellow magicians Ranyart and Qoquaq to gather and carry the population to their new home.

The album was recorded using a mobile studio situated at Anderson's country home in Seer Green, Buckinghamshire, with himself as the sole producer and Mike Dunne as the engineer. Musically, the album features elements of progressive rock with psychedelic folk, experimental electronics, and world music, and features Anderson playing every instrument, which includes a variety of keyboards, guitars, and percussion. The track "Ocean Song" was performed live at select shows during Yes's 1976 North American tour.

Olias of Sunhillow peaked at number eight on the UK Album Charts, the best performing chart position of the solo albums released by the band at the time. It reached number forty-seven on the US Billboard 200. The album received generally favourable reviews from music critics, and was reissued in 2021 with a remastered stereo mix, from which a 5.1 surround sound mix was created. Since 2000, Anderson has been working on music for a sequel album entitled The Songs of Zamran: Son of Olias, which revolves around the creation of Earth's structure.

== Background and writing ==
By mid-1975, Anderson had been the lead vocalist in the progressive rock band Yes for seven years. In August of that year the band, which was then a line-up of Anderson, bassist Chris Squire, guitarist Steve Howe, drummer Alan White, and keyboardist Patrick Moraz, completed the 1974–1975 tour in support of their seventh album, Relayer. The group, who had been recording and touring consistently for the past five years, felt a break was necessary and agreed to take time off for each member to make their own solo album.

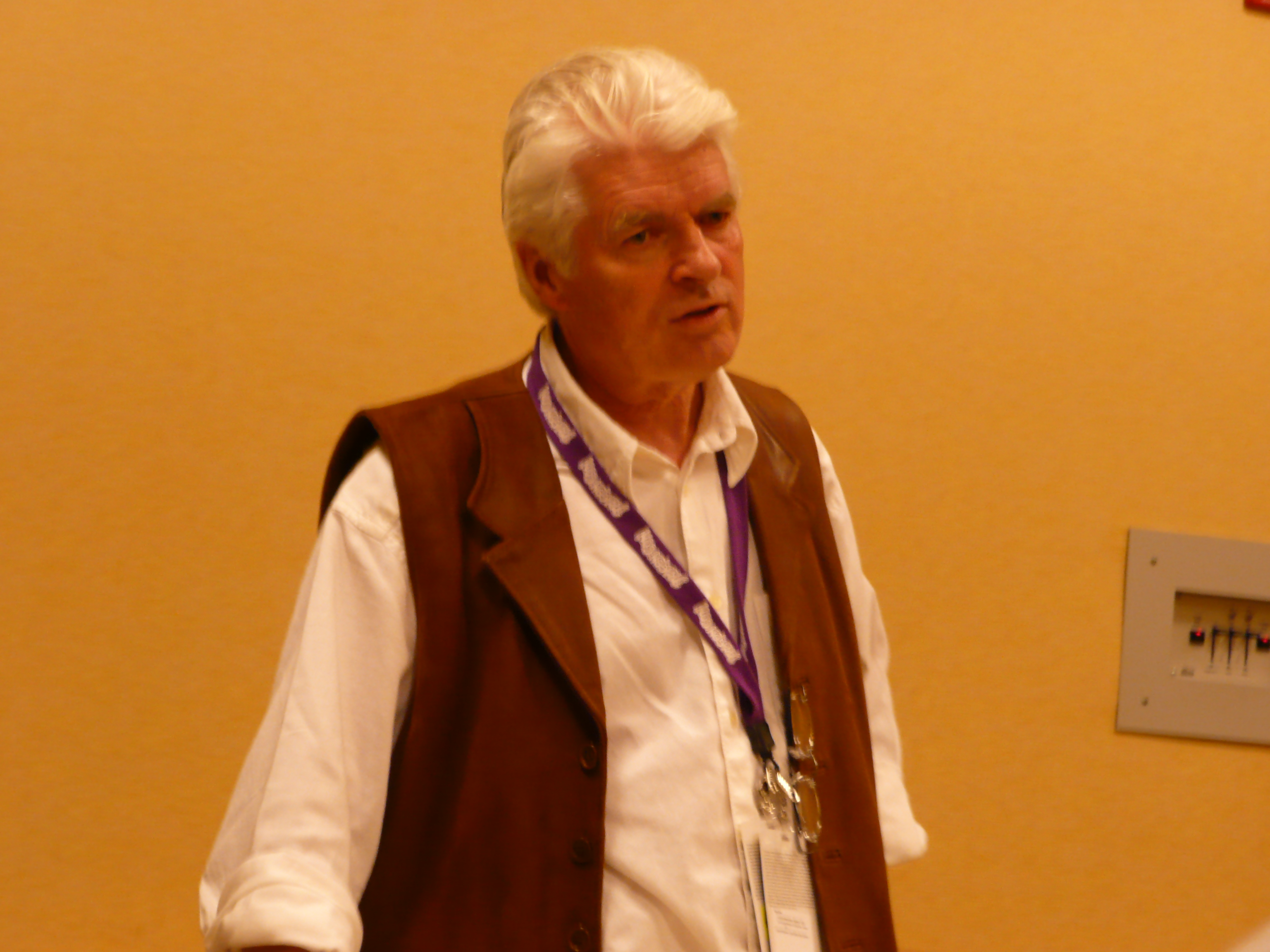
The story originates from artwork that Roger Dean produced for Yes

For his solo effort, Anderson wished to present a concept album which told a "semi-science fiction" story inspired by the artwork that Roger Dean had designed for Yes's fourth album, Fragile (1971). Dean's first piece of work for the group, the front cover depicts a tiny planet breaking apart and a glider escaping into space, which Anderson adapted into the story with additional inspiration from the novels The Finding of the Third Eye and The Initiation of the World by writer, painter, and mystic Vera Stanley Alder and The Lord of the Rings trilogy by J.R.R. Tolkien. The latter book by Alder describes the theory of four "nature tribes" that once lived on the planet: Negro, Oriental, Nordic, and Asian, which became the four tribes in Olias that were not of people, but "music consciousness tribes". On the first day of recording Anderson had yet to have a concrete story, but started to formulate one slowly from watching the sunrise that morning. He spent about a year on the story. Looking back on the album, Anderson thought it was "not that well mapped out" with "vague" interpretations of the different characters and settings. "I just thought of the story as three magicians coming out of space to take these tribes from one planet to another to save them from destruction. It's a very simple story [...] I hope it will be taken on a level without people thinking there are any hidden meanings."

Anderson's growing desire to learn about musical structure and his own performing capabilities with various instruments made Olias of Sunhillow a platform for him to explore this with a self-taught approach, without help from other musicians. He had previously relied on his Yes bandmates for seeing his ideas for songs through. Despite his insecurities regarding his own instrumental abilities, he had collected multiple instruments during Yes tours and dabbled with them. Having considered spending time learning to play the piano with a teacher, he eventually decided against this, choosing instead to spend several months practising on everything within his instrument collection until he was satisfied that he'd progressed enough to record with them. Halfway through the album, it became clear to Anderson what he could and could not do: "You just find out where you're at in being able to express yourself. It was an intense period of time." Despite not being proficient with keyboards or percussion instruments at the time Anderson thought that "What I've pulled off attracts me and sounds right", and focused on the accuracy of expressing his ideas to tape rather than the technical ability of his playing.

=== Plot ===
The planet of Sunhillow is home to four tribes—Nagrunium, Asatranius, Oractaniom and Nordranious—each of which represents a different aspect of music consciousness, which comes under threat after a catastrophic eruption of its volcano. Olias, a magician, is the chosen architect of an ark, named the Moorglade Mover, to fly Sunhillow's people to a new planet. He is helped by fellow magicians Ranyart, the harp-playing navigator of the glider, and Qoquaq (pronounced "ko-quake"), the mystic and appointed spokesperson who unites the four tribes to leave the planet together.

Olias fashions the Moorglade Mover by persuading Sunhillow's trees and fish to sacrifice their lives and substance to form it, while Qoquaq travels across Sunhillow using trance singing to bring together the mutually suspicious tribes to unite and board the ship. With the population on board and in a collective trance, the ship leaves Sunhillow just before the planet explodes into millions of silent teardrops. As the glider travels through deep space, the refugees succumb to the mysterious Moon Ra, a force of disorientation. Creating an evil form out of their panic and frustration, they are reassured and reunified by Olias through his singing of chords of love and life.

The Moorglade Mover lands on the plains of a new planet named Asguard, and the tribes disembark and go their separate ways. Their mission completed, Olias, Ranyart, and Qoquaq ascend the highest of Asguard's mountains to sleep and "become one with the universe".

== Recording ==
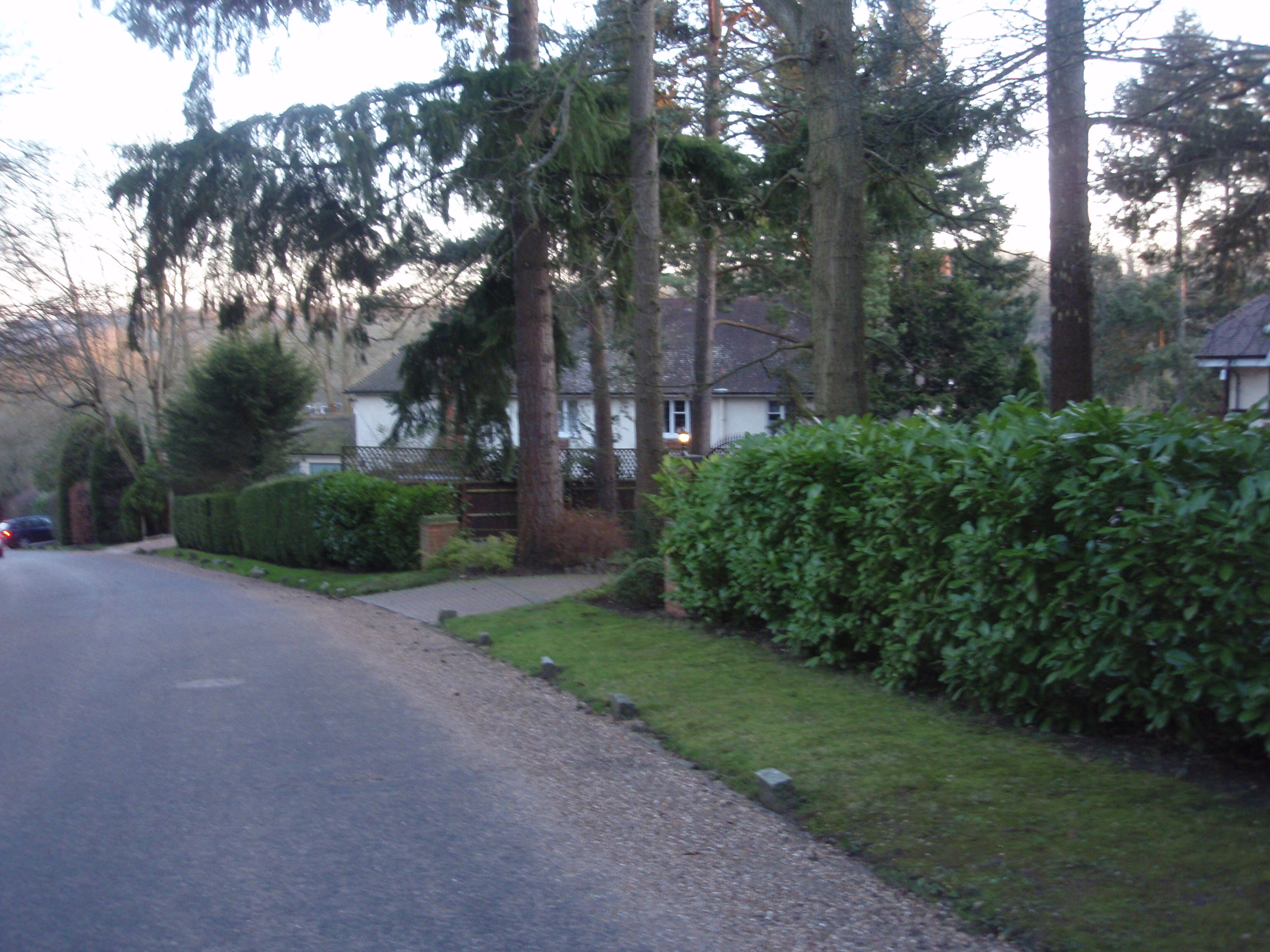
Long Grove, where the album was recorded

The album was recorded in approximately four months in Anderson's then home at Long Grove in Seer Green, Buckinghamshire, which housed a garage that housed a mobile recording studio named the Mobile Mobile. Anderson performed all of the vocals and instruments himself, playing over thirty instruments (amongst them different types of keyboards, guitars, lutes, percussion, harp, wooden flute, Asian bells, sitar, Moog synthesiser and Turkish saz). He still considered his voice his primary instrument and used layered vocals to create impressions of a new language on "Sound Out the Galleon". He chose the words particularly for his voice as he was technically unable to play a dedicated solo on an instrument and called them "a vocal exercise [...] I sang it until we created twenty voices and finished up with this tangible energy."

Two-thirds of the album was initially recorded in demo form onto 8-track tape, which Anderson used as a guide to write the complete arrangements that were then re-recorded onto 24-track. To help with operating the recording desk and obtaining the desired sound for the album, Anderson hired Yes sound engineer Mike Dunne. Anderson worked for as long as ten hours a day on the album and took weekends off. Anderson praised Dunne's involvement on the project, particularly during the mixing stage, the second side of which lasted within a week. Mixing the first side, however, was problematic because Anderson continued to make changes to the music due to his dissatisfaction with it. In the end, Anderson commented of the final mix that, with Dunne's help, "It was what I wanted to hear. Mike was more than the second man, he was part of the mix." In the end, over 100 tracks were used to make the album. The pressure of recording it resulted in delays which caused Atlantic to push its release by some months. Anderson said: "There were points when I didn't think I was going to finish it, and that I was going to end up a nervous wreck."

Anderson was cautious over the music and refused to play it to anyone in case they did not like it, including his wife and Atlantic president Ahmet Ertegun; Dunne was the only other person that heard the album. Anderson named Yes keyboardists Rick Wakeman and Patrick Moraz, and Greek keyboardist and composer Vangelis as influences in his keyboard work on the album. After the album was finished, management of RCA Records informed Vangelis (who was signed to the label at the time), of their dissatisfaction that he had played on Olias of Sunhillow without informing them. Vangelis denied any involvement on the album despite RCA having thought the keyboards on the album were performed in his style. Vangelis said: "I myself was very surprised it had my name on the thank you-list. Maybe I have influenced Jon, I don't know. And it's clear that it's closer to this than you get with Yes. But maybe it's a coincidence. In any case, it's a formidable feat there is such a record when it features like Jon a debutante on keyboards. I believe the record represents more the way he is than what he does with Yes, no offense intended [...] Anderson is not an instrumentalist in the old sense of the term and yet he has made, with lots of effort, a marvellous record."

== Release ==
The album was originally set for a release around Christmas of 1975, but it was pushed back some months so Anderson could complete it. In early 1976 he was pressured by his Yes band mates to complete the album before a proposed Japanese tour, but the plan was cancelled due to Anderson's exhaustion from working on Olias. The album was released in July 1976 on Atlantic Records. The album peaked at number 8 on the UK and number 47 in the United States. "Ocean Song" was performed by Yes on their 1976 tour, but as with the other songs they performed from other members' solo albums, it was dropped after the first few weeks.

== Artwork ==
Despite repeated requests from Anderson, Roger Dean was too busy to commit to designing the cover, so Anderson decided upon a series of designs by artist David Fairbrother-Roe, who was suggested by a friend.

== Reception ==
Professional ratings
Review scores
Source	Rating
AllMusic	4/5 stars
The Rolling Stone Record Guide	2/5 stars

Writing in RAM in July 1976, Bob Edmunds described the album as being "as impressive as anything Yes have produced collectively... Musicians with greater skills (e.g. Mike Oldfield) have created instrumental works on this scale but have always been denied access to the wonderful instrument of Jon Anderson's voice. Endless tours have done nothing to detract from one of the richest, purest voices in rock … . Olias has a continuity of intensity rarely found on any album, let alone one this ambitious. It won't go down too well with those who reject anything except full-tilt rock'n'roll. But there's no way you can deny the sheer grandeur of Jon Anderson's music, no matter what opinions you hold about rock."

Paul Stump's 1997 History of Progressive Rock called the album "probably the most complete manifesto to Progressive ideology (infinitely more so than [Tales from] Topographic [Oceans])." Stump praised the album's divergence from the normally accepted practices and language of mainstream rock, while noting that it is also very accessible to a mainstream rock audience. In AllMusic, Dave Connolly concluded "the idea may seem overly ambitious, but Anderson fills the record with enough magical moments to delight fans of Yes' mystic side... at no point does the music lose its spellbinding effect for lack of sonic detail. Olias of Sunhillow is faithful to the spirit of Yes, though decidedly more airy than that band's visceral style ... Olias of Sunhillow is not the missing Yes album some might hope it to be, though it does prefigure the later Jon & Vangelis collaborations of the '80s." Writing on his own Progrography website, Connolly has also commented that "it's not a stretch to say that Olias of Sunhillow looks and sounds like [Roger] Dean's previous Yes artwork come to life. Since Anderson himself handles all the instruments, the album is an airier affair than Yes, and yet at the heart of these songs is the same captivating, intoxicating core that the singer brought to that band.... Olias of Sunhillow is the one Anderson album most likely to please Yes fans, immersed as it is in their mystical aura. It's also a gorgeously packaged product (in LP form, anyway), which helps set the mood immeasurably."

Writing about Olias of Sunhillow on his Mewsings blog in 2009 (thirty-three years after the album's initial release), Murray Ewing reflected "there’s a dangerous swerve towards the New Age in Anderson’s first solo album, both in the optimistic whimsy of its fantasy world, and the musical palette of soft, sparkling synths and world instruments. Thankfully, it easily escapes that particular doldrum of musical hell through sheer energy (on the musical front) and sheer weirdness (on the fantasy front). This isn’t music to attune your chakras to, it’s adventurous, full of drama, uplifting melodies, evocative soundscapes, and a fresh unearthliness that makes it the only fantasy album I can think of which genuinely sounds like it could have come from another world."

Classic Rock said the album's lyrics were "as preposterous as they come."

== Reissues ==
The album has been released several times. Wounded Bird Records in the US released the album on 28 February 2006. Contrary to some earlier releases it presents all the artwork, but very small. Some earlier CD releases include only part of the original artwork and story, omitting pages 3–6 of the original vinyl album. The Japanese pressing on MMG Inc/Atlantic AMCY-18 presents the complete artwork in a booklet, like the vinyl version with eight pages (including frontcover and backcover).

The album was reissued in January 2014 on SACD by Audio Fidelity Records.

In 2021 the album was reissued in a CD+DVD package from Cherry Red Records. The CD contains a remastered version of the album in stereo. The DVD contains the remastered audio in 96/24 stereo LPCM, as well as a 5.1 surround mix in both DTS 96/24 and Dolby AC3 formats; the 5.1 audio is upmixed from the stereo masters because the original 24-track tapes could not be located. The packaging includes reproductions of the original album art and story, although again with small reproduction that may make the lettering hard to read. Two enclosed booklets contain track listings, technical information, lyrics, and an interview with Anderson by Malcolm Dome.

== Sequel ==
In 2004, Anderson called for collaborators to contact him via his website. He described a project that would be a "return to Olias". In 2006, around the time Olias of Sunhillow was re-released, Anderson announced that he was making a sequel called The Songs of Zamran: Son of Olias. On 3 January 2013, Anderson confirmed he was still working on The Songs of Zamran: Son of Olias. The following year, Anderson stated on his Facebook page: "I keep myself busy working on the Zamran project."

== Track listing ==
Words and music by Jon Anderson.

Side one
No.	Title	Length
1.	"Ocean Song"	3:12
2.	"Meeting (Garden of Geda)"/"Sound Out the Galleon"	3:28
3.	"Dance of Ranyart"/"Olias (To Build the Moorglade)"	4:14
4.	"Qoquaq Ën Transic"/"Naon"/"Transic Tö"	7:03
5.	"Flight of the Moorglade"	3:22

Side two
No.	Title	Length
1.	"Solid Space"	5:16
2.	"Moon Ra"/"Chords"/"Song of Search"	12:48
3.	"To the Runner"	4:26

== Personnel ==
Adapted from the 2021 release booklet notes.

Music

- Jon Anderson
  - vocals
  - keyboards (Minimoog, Korg miniKORGs Mk 1 & 2, Farfisa organ, Rhodes 66 electric piano, double manual Mellotron, church organ in Beaconsfield, Baldwin baby grand piano, Freeman String Symphonizer)
  - guitars, lutes and other stringed instruments (Martin and Gibson acoustic guitars, Gibson Melody Maker electric guitar, Höfner violin bass guitar, Gibson mandocello, sitar, tampuri, bouzouki, saz)
  - percussion (Ludwig wood blocks, tambourine, triangle, custom-built cymbal tree, assorted cymbals and gongs, marimba, glockenspiel, toy xylophone, bells, Chinese bells, African cowbells, Tibetan bells)
  - other instruments (Celtic harp, Mbira, assorted African wooden flutes, drums, large brass band drum, brass band snare drum, Caribbean long drums, assorted Navajo drums, African skin drums, tabla)

Production

- Mike Dunne – engineer
- Brian "It's Going Now" Gaylor – electronics
- John Martin – co-ordination, equipment, goodies
- Brian East – mastering at RCA
- Dave Roe – illustrator, designer
- Hipgnosis – art direction
- Jeff Cummings – portrait
- Richard Manning – portrait colouring

== Charts ==
Chart (1976)	Peak position
Australian Albums (Kent Music Report)	68
UK Albums (Official Charts)	8
US Billboard 200	47

Chart (2021)	Peak position
Scottish Albums (Official Charts)	49
UK Independent Albums (Official Charts)	17

== Certifications ==
Region	Certification	Certified units/sales
United Kingdom (BPI)	Silver	60,000^{^}
^{^} Shipments figures based on certification alone.
