= Deseo (Jon Anderson album) =

Studio album by Jon Anderson
- Released: 19 July 1994
- Recorded: 1994
- Genre: World music
- Length: 43:24
- Label: Windham Hill Records
- Producer: Jon Anderson

Jon Anderson chronology
In the City of Angels (1988)	Deseo (1994)	Change We Must (1994)

Deseo (meaning desire or wish) is the sixth solo album by Yes lead singer Jon Anderson, released in 1994. Augmented by well-known artists from across South and Latin America, with cameos from María Conchita Alonso, Cecilia Toussaint, Milton Nascimento, Ruben Rada, and many others.

== The Deseo Remixes ==
In 1995, The Deseo Remixes was released featuring eight remixes of the material from Deseo by Deep Forest, Trans-Global Underground, Future Sound of London and Global Communication.

== Track listing ==
All songs written and produced by Jon Anderson, except where noted

No.	Title	Writer(s)	Length
1.	"Amor Real"		4:16
2.	"A-DE-O"	Pedro Tierra, Milton Nascimento, Pedro Casaldaliga	3:17
3.	"Bridges"		3:31
4.	"Seasons"		3:33
5.	"Floresta"		3:04
6.	"Cafe"		3:19
7.	"This Child"		2:12
8.	"Dança Do Ouro"	Lourenço Baeta, Zé Renato	4:24
9.	"Midnight Dancing"		3:49
10.	"Deseo"		5:30
11.	"Latino"		3:18
12.	"Bless This"		2:56

== Personnel ==
- Jon Anderson – vocals and keyboards
- Deborah Anderson – backing vocals
- Otmaro Ruiz – keyboards
- Freddy Ramos – guitar
- Aaron Serafaty – percussion
- Eduardo del Signore – bass
- Milton Nascimento – vocals on "Amor Real"
- Mountain Girls – vocals on "A-DE-O"
- Glenn Monroig – vocals on "Cafe"
- Boca Livre – vocals on "Dança Do Ouro"
- Valentina Vargas – vocals on "Midnight Dancing"
- Cecilia Toussaint – vocals on "Deseo"
- Girls of Puerto Rico – vocals on "Latino"
- Vanessa Mixco – voice on "Bless This"
- Rubén Rada – percussion and vocals on "Seasons"
- Steve Thornton – percussion on "Amor Real" and "Midnight Dancing"
- Lorenza Ponce – violin on "Amor Real" and "Midnight Dancing"
- Paul Haney – sax on "Amor Real"
- Jorge Laboy – guitar on "Cafe"
- The Reedam Singers – Deborah Anderson, Nina Swan, Liza Gelabart, Carla Day and Francis Benitez
- Eduardo Del Signore – bass, production, composition
- Toshio Sone Vasquez – design, packaging
- Ron Salaises – sound effects
- Ron Wasserman – engineering
- Freddy Ramos – guitar
- Otmaro Ruiz – keyboards
- Ric Wilson – mastering
- Aaron Serfaty – percussion
- Miyoko Sone – photography
- Glen Wexler – inlay photography
- John Laraio – production equipment assistance
- Gary Barlough – recording (early recording in Big Bear)
