= Song of Seven =

Studio album by Jon Anderson
- Released: 7 November 1980
- Recorded: 1980
- Genre: Progressive rock
- Length: 39:06
- Label: Atlantic
- Producer: Jon Anderson

Jon Anderson chronology
Olias of Sunhillow (1976)	Song of Seven (1980)	Animation (1982)

Singles from Song of Seven
- 1. "Some Are Born" Released: 3 October 1980; 2. "Take Your Time" Released: 5 December 1980; 3. "Heart of the Matter" Released: 1981 (US); 4. "Everybody Loves You" Released: 1981 (NL)

Professional ratings
Review scores
Source	Rating
AllMusic	2/5 stars
MusicHound Rock: The Essential Album Guide	2/5 stars

Song of Seven is the second solo album by Yes lead singer Jon Anderson, released in 1980. It was his first to use an actual band (the New Life Band).

== Overview ==
Song of Seven was released during Anderson's first hiatus from Yes and supported by his first solo tour. Anderson has said the album's backing tracks took three weeks to record, with further overdubs another two or three weeks. (Note: As stated in December 1980 during the Trent FM radio show "The Rock Show" with Jeff Cooper.)

"Some Are Born", "Days", "Everybody Loves You" and "Hear It" were originally written and demoed during the Tormato sessions. The "Some Are Born" and "Days" demo versions from these sessions were included as bonus tracks on the 2004 CD reissue of Tormato; however, the arrangements recorded on Song of Seven draw more on Celtic and R&B influences.

== Track listing ==
All songs written by Jon Anderson unless indicated.

Side one
No.	Title	Writer(s)	Length
1.	"For You For Me"		4:24
2.	"Some Are Born"		4:02
3.	"Don't Forget (Nostalgia)"		2:57
4.	"Heart Of The Matter"	Anderson, Ronnie Leahy	4:18
5.	"Hear It"		1:48

Side two
No.	Title	Length
6.	"Everybody Loves You"	4:01
7.	"Take Your Time"	3:12
8.	"Days"	3:24
9.	"Song Of Seven"	11:07

== Personnel ==
- Jon Anderson – lead vocals, acoustic guitar (2), keyboards (1, 7, 8), harp (9)
- Ronnie Leahy – keyboards (1–9)
- Damian Anderson – keyboards (5), child voice (9)
- Ian Bairnson – guitar (1–3, 5–8), bass (2), backing vocals (2)
- Clem Clempson – guitar (4, 9)
- John Giblin – fretless bass (1, 3, 6–9)
- Jack Bruce – bass (4)
- Mel – bass (5)
- Morris Pert – drums, percussion (1–3, 5–7, 9)
- Simon Phillips – drums (4)
- Dick Morrissey – saxophone (2,4)
- Johnny Dankworth – alto saxophone (3)
- Chris Rainbow – backing vocals (2–4, 6, 8, 9)
- Deborah Anderson – harmony vocals (9)
- Jade Anderson (credited as "Petite Jade") – child voice (9)
- Delmé String Quartet; arranged by David Ogden (9)

Technical

- Mike Dunne – engineer
- Brian Gaylor – electronic
- Jon Anderson – cover
- Alwyn Clayden – art direction, design
- Ian Nicholson – illustrations

== Charts ==
Chart (1980–81)	Peak position
UK Albums (Official Charts)	38
US Billboard 200	143
