= The Promise Ring (album) =

Studio album by Jon Anderson
- Released: 17 June 1997
- Genre: Celtic music
- Length: 39:16
- Label: OM Town Higher Octave Music Inc.
- Producer: Jon Anderson

Jon Anderson chronology
| Lost Tapes of Opio (1996) | The Promise Ring (1997) | Earth Mother Earth (1997) |

The Promise Ring (subtitled "Songs of New Eireland") is the eleventh solo album by Yes lead singer Jon Anderson, released in June 1997 on the OM Town label.

== Overview ==
The Promise Ring is a collection of songs of Celtic music composed by Jon Anderson and the Froggin' Peach Orchestra, a Celtic music local band based at the San Luis Obispo's Frog 'n Peach Pub.

In the inner booklet, Jon Anderson reveals that he "always wanted to sing about the Celtic knowledge" and that "one night, [he] dreamed about these lyrics and the songs of Eireland, as if [he] was in the year 2002 and Eire was once again One Country", hence the lyrics "2002" in the chorus of the title song "The Promise Ring".

Jon Anderson dedicated the album "to [his] mum and dad for giving [him] this love of life".

== Track listing ==
All songs written by Jon Anderson and the Froggin' Peach Orchestra.

| No. | Title | Length |
|---|---|---|
| 1. | "Born To Dance" | 3:59 |
| 2. | "Flowers Of The Morning" | 4:17 |
| 3. | "Timing Of The Known" | 5:31 |
| 4. | "True Life Song" | 4:18 |
| 5. | "Are You?" | 3:46 |
| 6. | "My Sweet Jane" | 3:35 |
| 7. | "True Hands Of Fate" | 5:20 |
| 8. | "The Promise Ring" | 5:30 |
| 9. | "O'er" | 3:02 |

== Personnel ==
- Jon Anderson - vocals, lyrics and melodies
- Jane Luttenberger Anderson - duet vocals
- The Froggin' Peach Orchestra:
  - Brooks Hill - guitars, orchestra leader
  - Paul Beeler - guitar
  - Paul Welch - guitar
  - Karen Peterson - guitar, flute, orchestration
  - Christine Dewees - guitar
  - Julie Cooper - fiddle
  - Marlene Beeles - fiddle
  - Gary Atkinson - fiddle
  - Mary McCluskey - fiddle, dulcimer on "O'er"
  - Chris Scott - flute
  - Mikey Green - flute
  - Dreima Barker - pennywhistle
  - Dave Dewees - pennywhistle, mandolin
  - Inga Swearingen - spoons
  - Adam Hunter - bodhrán
  - Charlie Perryess - upright bass
  - Bruce Powers - dulcimer
  - Laura Cooper - keyboards
  - Marty Lau - drums
  - Tim Costa - percussion
  - Dave Lewicki - mandolin
  - Miles Clark - mandolin
  - Jonas Richardson - mandolin
  - Peter Richardson - mandolin
  - Peter Morin - mandolin
  - Cathy Harvey - keyboards
  - Alan Dick - violin
  - Dan the Mystic - storyteller
  - John Bartelt - guitar on "My Sweet Jane"

== Production ==
- Produced by Jon Anderson
- Executive producers: Matt Marshall & Dan Selene
- Sonic Solutions Engineer: Kevin Dickey
- Engineer: Matt May
- Sound Coordinator: Greg Notley
- Recorded (live) at the Frog 'n Peach Pub (during "those wonderful evenings") & at Opio Studio - San Luis Obispo, CA
- Digitally Reassembled & Edited by William Aura at Auravision Studios
- Mastered by William Aura at Quad Teck Digital - L.A., CA
- Art Direction & Design: Benjamin Cziller
- Production Assistance & Calligraphy: Nancy Forrest
- Production Director: Maria Ehrenreich
- Sr. VP, Sales & Marketing: Scott Bergstein
- Manager, Artist Development & Promotion: Jo Ann Klass-Gerstein
