= The Living Tree (album) =

Studio album by Jon Anderson & Rick Wakeman
- Released: 11 October 2010 (available at concert venues); 29 November 2010 (general release)
- Recorded: August – September 2010
- Genre: Progressive rock, acoustic rock
- Length: 42:47
- Label: Gonzo Multimedia
- Producer: Jon Anderson; Rick Wakeman; Erik Jordan

Jon Anderson & Rick Wakeman chronology
The More You Know (1998)	The Living Tree (2010)	Survival & Other Stories (2011)

Professional ratings
Review scores
Source	Rating
Allmusic	3.5/5 stars

The Living Tree is an album by Jon Anderson and Rick Wakeman (as Anderson/Wakeman), both previously members of progressive rock band Yes. The album was initially sold only as a souvenir during their UK tour in Autumn 2010, titled "The Anderson Wakeman Project 360" and from the Gonzo Multimedia online store. It was made available to the public on 29 November 2010.

== Overview ==
When the album was first announced, it was intended to comprise re-workings of classic Yes songs and at least 9 new songs, four of which were featured on the previous (inaugural) Anderson/Wakeman tour in 2006. The ultimate release contained exactly 9 new tracks.

Recording for the album began in August 2010. Wakeman stated that he would record the backing tracks at his studio in England and that these would be sent to Anderson in the US to record his vocals. These tracks were all then to be sent back to Wakeman for mixing and mastering.

== Tracks ==
No.	Title	Length
1.	"Living Tree (Part 1)"	4:03
2.	"Morning Star"	4:30
3.	"House of Freedom"	5:37
4.	"Living Tree (Part 2)"	4:37
5.	"Anyway and Always"	3:51
6.	"23/24/11"	6:24
7.	"Forever"	5:32
8.	"Garden"	3:23
9.	"Just One Man"	4:46

All tracks lyrics by Anderson, music by Wakeman, except "Just One Man" (lyrics: Anderson; music: Jeremy Cubert; music performed by Wakeman). Produced by Anderson/Wakeman/Erik Jordan.

== Personnel ==
- Jon Anderson – vocals, guitars
- Rick Wakeman – piano, keyboards, synthesizers
- Erik Jordan – engineer

== Charts ==
Chart (2010)	Peak position
UK Independent Albums (OCC)	40
