= Survival & Other Stories =

Studio album by Jon Anderson
- Released: 6 June 2011; 26 July 2011
- Genre: Rock, new-age
- Length: 48:31
- Label: Gonzo/Voiceprint (Catalogue Number: HST079CD)
- Producer: Jon Anderson; Jane Anderson

Jon Anderson chronology
The Living Tree (2010)	Survival & Other Stories (2011)	Open (2011)

Survival & Other Stories is the fourteenth solo album by former Yes singer Jon Anderson, released in spring 2011.

On his website, Anderson had invited anyone to send mp3 samples as a basis for collaboration. Much of this material led to the content of Survival & Other Stories. The song "Just One Man" also features on the Anderson/Wakeman album The Living Tree (2010).

== Tracks ==
All lyrics are written by Jon Anderson

No.	Title	Music	Length
1.	"New New World"	Jamie Dunlap	4:13
2.	"Understanding Truth"	Peter Kiel	2:24
3.	"Unbroken Spirit"	Jann Castor	3:57
4.	"Love of the Life"	Dan Spollen	2:49
5.	"Big Buddha Song"	Kevin Shima	5:30
6.	"Incoming"	Spollen	7:56
7.	"Effortlessly"	Dunlap	3:10
8.	"Love And Understanding"	Steve Layton	4:12
9.	"Just One Man"	Jeremy Cubert	4:30
10.	"Sharpening The Sword"	Dunlap	3:40
11.	"Cloudz"	Paul Quinn	6:05

== Production ==
Produced by Jon & Jane Anderson

- Stefan Podell: orchestration (6)
- Ryan Fraley: orchestration (9)
- Christophe Lebled: soundscape (9)
- Daniel Reinker: viola (9)
- Mixed with the help of Patrick MacDougall
- Package design by Jay Nungesser
- Mastered by Mike Pietrini

== Charts ==
Chart (2011)	Peak position
UK Independent Albums (OCC)	46
