= In the City of Angels =

Studio album by Jon Anderson
- Released: May 1988
- Recorded: 1988
- Studio: Ocean Way Recording (Hollywood, California); The Manor (Shipton-on-Cherwell, UK)
- Genre: Pop rock
- Length: 47:12
- Label: Columbia
- Producer: Stewart Levine

Jon Anderson chronology
3 Ships (1985)	In the City of Angels (1988)	Deseo (1994)

Singles from In the City of Angels
- 1. "Hold on to Love" Released: May 1988; 2. "Is It Me" Released: August 1988

Professional ratings
Review scores
Source	Rating
Allmusic	2/5 stars

In the City of Angels is the fifth solo album by Yes lead singer Jon Anderson, released in 1988.

Unlike most of Anderson's previous solo works, this album contains many additional songwriters. Consequently, it is the most commercial sounding album in his catalog. Members of the band Toto perform on several songs. Anderson reciprocated the favor by performing on their album The Seventh One (recorded about the same time as In the City of Angels).

Two songs from the album ("Hold on to Love" and "In a Lifetime") were co-written by Lamont Dozier, of Motown records.

A music video for "Hold on to Love" aired on TV. In the video, the album is titled In the City of Lost Angels. Chris Squire has a cameo appearance in the video as acoustic bass player.

== Track listing ==
All tracks are written by Jon Anderson, with additional writers noted.

Side one
No.	Title	Writer(s)	Length
1.	"Hold on to Love"	Lamont Dozier	4:46
2.	"If It Wasn't for Love (Oneness Family)"		4:25
3.	"Sundancing (For the Hopi/Navajo Energy)"		3:18
4.	"Is It Me"	Rhett Lawrence	4:25
5.	"In a Lifetime"	Dozier	4:14
6.	"For You"	David Paich	2:51

Side two
No.	Title	Writer(s)	Length
7.	"New Civilization"	Don Freeman, Gordon Peeke	4:31
8.	"It's on Fire"	Freeman	4:10
9.	"Betcha"	Lawrence	4:00
10.	"Top of the World (The Glass Bead Game)"	Paich	5:25
11.	"Hurry Home (Song from The Pleiades)"		4:58

== Personnel ==
- Jon Anderson - Vocals, Harp, Drums, Percussion
- Steve Lukather - Guitar (Track 10)
- Steve Porcaro - Keyboard programming (Track 10)
- Jeff Porcaro - Drums (Track 2, 4 & 10)
- Mike Porcaro - Bass (Tracks 2 & 4)
- David Paich - Keyboards, Orchestration (Tracks 2, 4, 6 & 10)
- Joseph Williams - Backing vocals (Track 10)
- Larry Williams - Keyboards, Programming (Tracks 1, 3, 5 & 9)
- John Robinson - Drums (Tracks 1, 3, 7–9)
- Paul Jackson Jr. - Guitar (Tracks 1 & 5)
- Jimmy Haslip - Bass (Track 1, 5, 7 & 8)
- Lenny Castro - Percussion (Tracks 1, 3, 5 & 7)
- Dann Huff - Guitar (Tracks 2, 4 & 8)
- Michael Landau - Guitar (Tracks 2, 4, 7–9 & 11)
- Marc Russo - Saxophone (Track 4)
- Paulinho Da Costa - percussion (Tracks 4 & 8)
- Gordon Peeke - Drum programming (Track 7)
- Don Freeman - Keyboards (Tracks 7 & 8)
- Jerry Hey - Trumpet (Track 7)
- Gary Grant - Trumpet (Track 7)
- Bill Reichenbach Jr. - Sax, Trombone (Tracks 7 & 9)
- Kim Hutchcroft - Sax (Track 7)
- Rhett Lawrence - Keyboards, Programming (Tracks 9 & 11)
- The Cathedral Choir - Backing vocals (Track 11)

== Reception ==
Paul Robicheau of The Boston Globe wrote a mixed review, referring to the album as "Jon goes to Hollywood". He criticized Anderson's "smarmy lyrics" and the album's commercial production, likening the album's sound to Toto. Robicheau singled out the track "Hold On To Love" as having a "perky appeal" and noted the "interesting rhythm" on "Sundancing". Robicheau concluded his review by writing "this is a record you can both love and hate."

== Charts ==
Chart (1988)	Peak position
Dutch Albums (Album Top 100)	33
