= Hayden Panettiere =

American actress and singer (1989–2026)

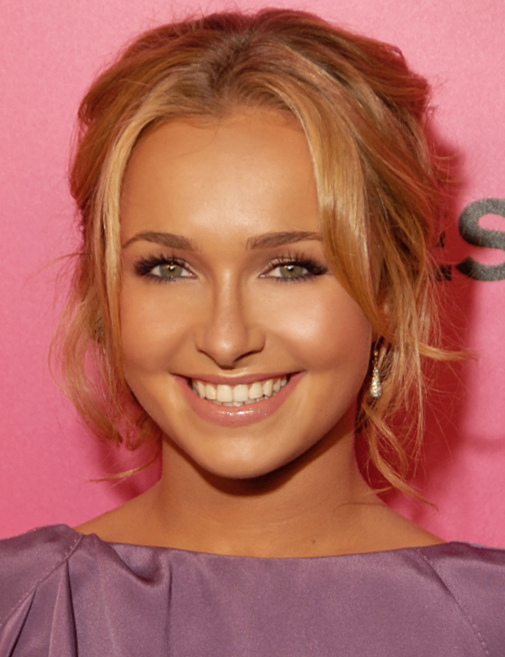
- Panettiere in 2009
- Born: Hayden Lesley Panettiere; August 21, 1989; Palisades, New York, U.S.
- Died: August 16, 2026 (aged 36); Greenville, South Carolina, U.S.
- Occupations: Actress; singer
- Years active: 1990–2026
- Works: Full list
- Partner: Wladimir Klitschko (2009–2011; 2013–2018)
- Children: 1
- Relatives: Jansen Panettiere (brother)

Hayden Lesley Panettiere (/ˌpænətiˈɛər/ PAN-ə-tee-AIR; August 21, 1989 – August 16, 2026) was an American actress and singer. She first appeared on screen when she was 11 months old, in a 1990 commercial; by age five, she had appeared in more than 50 commercials. Her first major television roles were as Sarah Roberts in the soap opera One Life to Live (1994–1997) and Lizzie Spaulding in the soap opera Guiding Light (1996–2000). She then earned a Grammy nomination for the spoken word album for A Bug's Life Read-Along (1998), making her the sixth-youngest nominee for the award.

Panettiere continued to develop her career with roles in the live-action animated film Dinosaur (2000), the biographical sports film Remember the Titans (2000), the legal drama series Ally McBeal (2002), the comedy film Racing Stripes (2005), and the drama film Ice Princess (2005). She gained wide recognition for portraying Claire Bennet in the superhero series Heroes (2006–2010), winning the Saturn Award for Best Supporting Actress. Further fame came with her portrayals of Kirby Reed in two films in the slasher franchise Scream (2011, 2023), and Juliette Barnes in the musical drama series Nashville (2012–2018), earning nominations for two Golden Globes for Best Supporting Actress.

Outside of big-screen projects, Panettiere voiced Kairi and Xion in the video game franchise Kingdom Hearts (2002–2017) and Samantha "Sam" Giddings in the horror game Until Dawn (2015). Towards the end of her career, she starred in a number of direct-to-video films.

== Early life ==
Hayden Lesley Panettiere was born on August 21, 1989, in Palisades, an unincorporated hamlet in Rockland County, New York. She was the eldest child of Lesley R. Vogel, a former daytime television soap opera actress, and Alan Lee "Skip" Panettiere, a captain in the New York City Fire Department (FDNY). She had a younger brother, Jansen. Panettiere was of Italian, German, and English descent. Her surname is of Italian origin and is associated with the Italian word for "baker". In her 2026 memoir, This Is Me: A Reckoning, she discussed the family's history and the pronunciation of the surname, which her family pronounced "pan-a-teery". According to her, the surname was inherited through her paternal family after her father was adopted by his stepfather.

Panettiere grew up in the Palisades area of Rockland County and maintained close ties with her extended family. Her maternal grandparents lived in Indiana, and she spent extended periods there during her childhood. She attended South Orangetown Middle School in Blauvelt, New York. Because of performing and travel, maintaining a conventional school schedule became difficult. She completed eighth grade and continued her education through homeschooling programs arranged around her work and travel schedule. Transitioning to homeschooling was a result of the workload she had during adolescence. Contemporary biographical accounts say she continued to study while balancing an irregular schedule.

== Career ==
=== 1990s: Beginnings ===
Panettiere first appeared on-screen at 11 months old in a 1990 Playskool toy train commercial. By five, she had appeared in more than 50 commercials. She told Gayle King on CBS Mornings on May 18, 2026, that she first appeared in a soap opera when she was four. She landed a role as Sarah Roberts on the ABC soap opera One Life to Live from 1994 to 1997, followed by Lizzie Spaulding on the CBS soap opera Guiding Light in 1996 and again from 1997 to 2000. While on Guiding Light, Panettiere's character Lizzie battled leukemia. The Leukemia & Lymphoma Society gave her its Special Recognition Award for drawing the attention of daytime viewers to the disease and for improving national awareness. She made her feature film debut at age nine, as the voice of Princess Dot in A Bug's Life (1998). Her first released film was The Object of My Affection (1998) at eight, in which she appears briefly as a mermaid in the school play in the opening scene. In 1999, she played the girl on a sinking sailboat in Message in a Bottle.

=== 2000s: Breakthrough with Heroes, Kingdom Hearts and music ===
Panettiere provided the voice for Suri in Disney's CGI-animated movie Dinosaur (2000) and portrayed Sheryl Yoast in Remember the Titans (2000), a role that won her a Young Artist Award for Best Supporting Young Actress. For her performance in Lifetime's If You Believe, she was nominated for the Young Artist Award for Young Actress Age Ten or Under in the category of Best Performance in a TV Movie or Pilot. Panettiere appeared on Fox's Ally McBeal as the title character's daughter, played the daughter of the main character Ruth Applewood in HBO Films' Normal, had a recurring guest role on Malcolm in the Middle, and guest starred on Law & Order: Special Victims Unit in two different roles. In 2004, Disney Channel gave Panettiere her first starring role as the daughter of Bill Pullman's character in Tiger Cruise.

Panettiere voiced Kairi in Square Enix and Disney's crossover action-RPG Kingdom Hearts (2002), as her first breakout video game role. In 2004, she appeared as a teenage girl caught in a fantasy transitional realm alongside fellow teen actor Ryan Kelley in The Dust Factory and the role of adolescent niece to Kate Hudson's title character in Raising Helen, where she portrayed an older sister of real-life siblings Abigail and Spencer Breslin. In 2005, Panettiere starred alongside Michelle Trachtenberg as an ice-skating rival in Disney's Ice Princess. Also in 2005, she played a jockey with a rising career, Channing Walsh, in Racing Stripes. She later reprised the role of Kairi in Kingdom Hearts II (2005) and Kingdom Hearts Birth by Sleep (2010).

Panettiere often sang the soundtracks for the films in which she also starred. She was nominated for a Grammy Award in 1999 for A Bug's Life Read-Along. In 2004, she recorded "My Hero Is You" for Tiger Cruise and "Someone Like You", a duet with Watt White for The Dust Factory (both also with accompanying videos). The following year, she recorded "I Fly" for Ice Princess. She recorded a song for the Hollywood Records compilation Girl Next (2006) and another song titled "Go to Girl" for Girl Next 2 (2007). Also in 2007, she sang the U.S. National Anthem at A Capitol Fourth and recorded a cover for "Cruella De Vil" for Disneymania 5, "Try" for the Bridge to Terabithia soundtrack, and a ballad titled "I Still Believe" for Cinderella III: A Twist in Time.

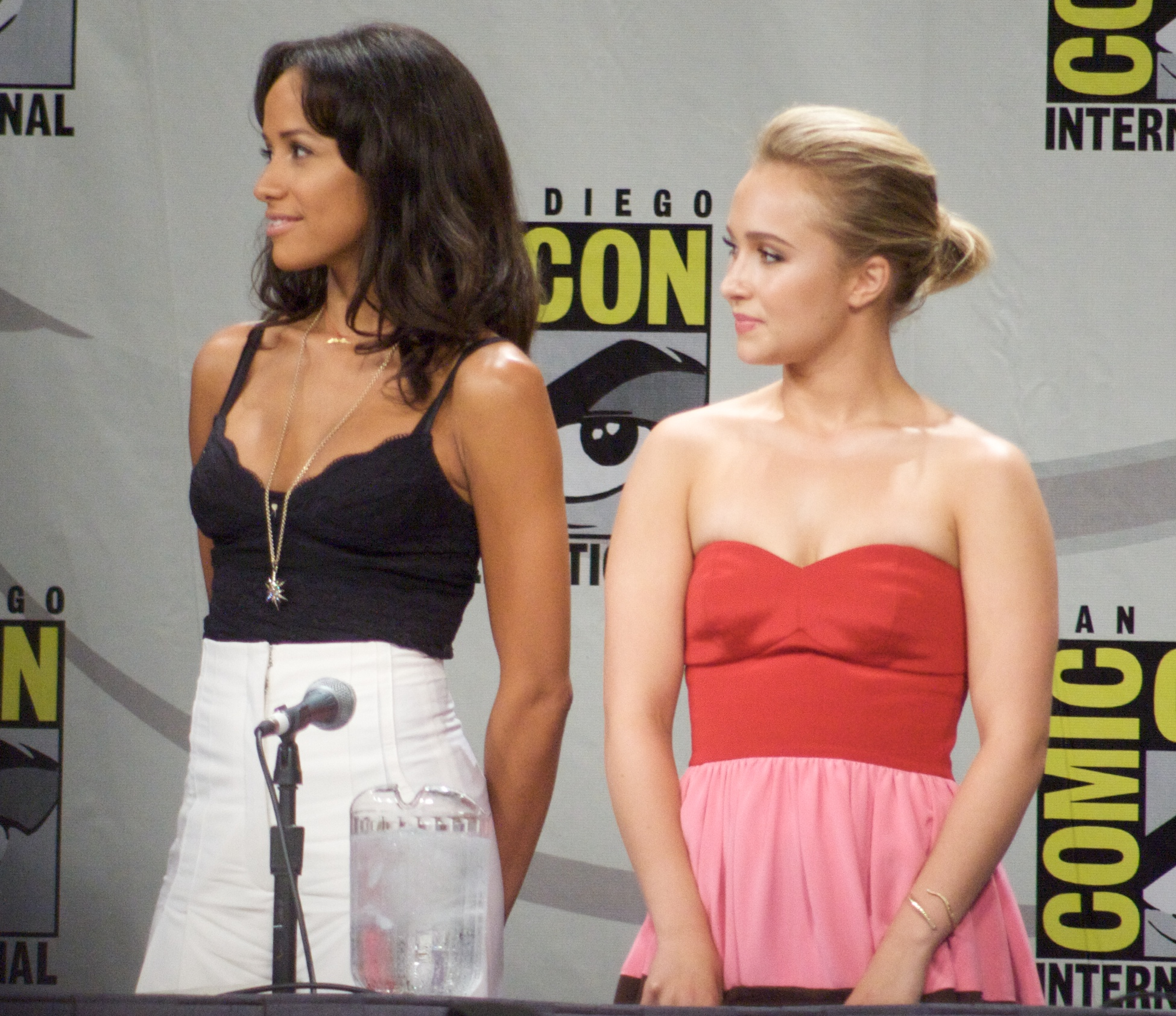
Dania Ramirez and Panettiere promoting Heroes at the 2008 San Diego Comic-Con

Panettiere gained greater fame as Claire Bennet in the NBC series Heroes, created by Tim Kring, as a high school cheerleader with healing powers. Thanks to her role on Heroes, she became a regular on the science fiction convention circuit, invited to conventions around the world in 2007, including Gen Con, New York Comic Con, and Fan Expo Canada. Panettiere said her acting options were sometimes limited because "people look at [her] as either the popular cheerleader type or just the blonde". In early 2007, Panettiere appeared on the MTV show Punk'd. The appearance was engineered by her mother and involved a male "fan" discussing her work with her, instigating a jealous reaction from the man's spouse. In April 2012, she hosted an episode of the new series. In 2006, Panettiere played a cheerleader in Bring It On: All or Nothing, which was released direct-to-video. She also had a supporting role as Adelaide Bourbon in the independent film Shanghai Kiss (2007). In June 2007, she signed with the William Morris Agency, after having being represented by the United Talent Agency. Forbes estimated that she earned $2 million in 2007.

In 2008, Panettiere appeared in the drama Fireflies in the Garden as a younger version of Emily Watson's character, Jane Lawrence. In September 2008, she appeared in a satirical video, a mock-PSA for Funny or Die titled "Hayden Panettiere PSA: Your Vote, Your Choice". In October, Panettiere appeared in another satirical Funny or Die PSA titled "Vote for McCain: He's just like George Bush, except older and with a worse temper". Panettiere's first single not associated with an acting role, the reggae-infused "Wake Up Call", was digitally released on August 5, 2008. The clothing brand Candie's announced that it was premiering an ad campaign for the single in late July. Candie's provided additional promotion with a television advertisement and a music video. Sebastian Stan, who portrayed the brother of Panettiere's character in The Architect, played her boyfriend in the video. In July 2009, Panettiere starred in the teen comedy I Love You, Beth Cooper.

=== 2010s: Acclaim with Scream and Nashville ===
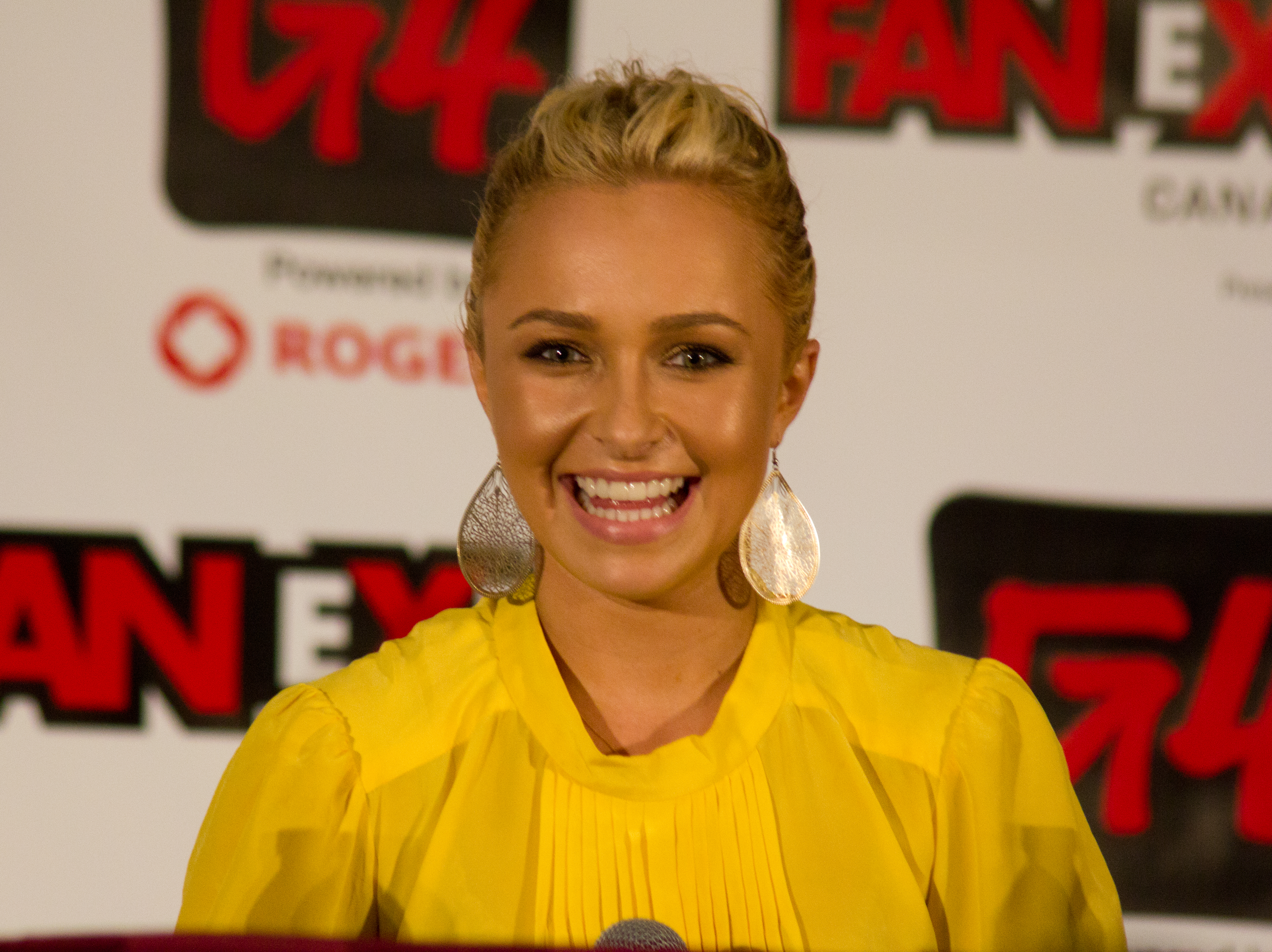
Panettiere at the 2011 Fan Expo Canada in Toronto

Panettiere voiced Kate in the animated film Alpha and Omega (2010). In September 2010, she was cast as Amanda Knox in the film Amanda Knox: Murder on Trial in Italy. In April 2011, she appeared in Scream 4, a sequel to Scream (1996), playing Kirby Reed. The film received mixed reviews, but she received acclaim for her role and a positive for the film. Also in 2011, she replaced Anne Hathaway as the voice of Red for the animated sequel Hoodwinked Too! Hood vs. Evil.

In March 2012, it was announced Panettiere had been cast opposite Connie Britton on the ABC musical drama series Nashville, where she portrayed Juliette Barnes. The show reunited Panettiere with Burgess Jenkins (who appears in the first few episodes) from Remember the Titans. Panettiere recorded several songs for Nashville, which were released as singles and included on the show's soundtrack albums. She made numerous concert appearances associated with the show's touring promotion. In 2013, Panettiere recorded a version of "The Fabric of My Life" for a Cotton Incorporated campaign.

In 2012, The Forger, in which she played the role of Amber, was released direct-to video (both this and Hoodwinked Too! Hood vs. Evil were made in 2009). She also voiced Xion in Kingdom Hearts 3D: Dream Drop Distance (2012). She was replaced by Alyson Stoner for the later sequel games of the series. In April 2015, Panettiere joined the cast of Custody (2016), alongside Viola Davis, with whom she appeared in 2006's The Architect. Also in 2015, Panettiere acted in Until Dawn, a PlayStation 4 game, playing the role of Samantha "Sam" Giddings. She reprised the role for a new post-credits scene in the remake version of the game, released on PlayStation 5 and Microsoft Windows.

=== 2020s: Final work ===
In January 2022, Panettiere briefly reprised her role as Kirby Reed in the Scream 4 sequel Scream in a photograph used in the film, revealing the character had survived the events of the fourth film in the series. She is acknowledged with a mention of "Special Thanks" for the photograph's use and she made a voice cameo. In May 2022, it was announced that Panettiere would be returning to the Scream franchise with Scream VI (2023), in what was her first on-screen film appearance since 2018 after a career hiatus. She did not appear in the franchise's next iteration, Scream 7. Her final film role was in the psychological thriller film Sleepwalker (2026), in which she played the lead role of Sarah Pangborn. She also served as the film's executive producer.

Before her death, Panettiere said in May 2026 that she was "trying her hand" at writing a television series and hoped to expand her work behind the camera by directing and producing, particularly to create safer working environments for actors and child performers. She also expressed interest in establishing a production company through which she could develop projects and provide opportunities for overlooked talent. In January 2026, she stated that she would also be willing to return if either Nashville or Heroes were revived.

== Other ventures ==
=== Modeling ===
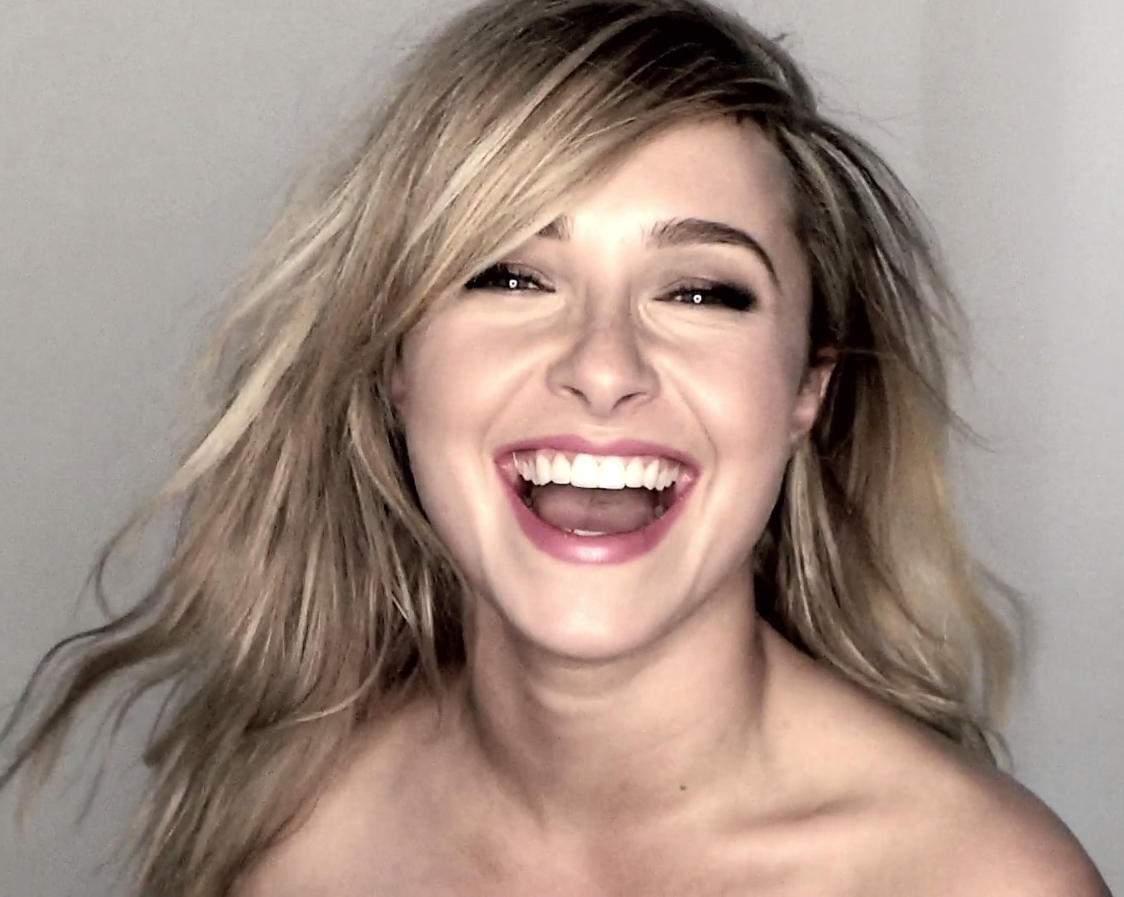
Panettiere posing for Cosmopolitan UK in July 2015

In late 2006, Neutrogena made Panettiere the cover girl for its new worldwide ad campaign. In September 2007, she appeared in a Heroes-themed Got Milk? ad photographed by Annie Leibovitz.

In February 2008, Kohl's announced that Panettiere would be Candie's next spokesperson. From 2007 to 2008, Panettiere designed limited-edition handbags for Dooney & Bourke and was photographed with the bags in magazine ads. In 2009, she was one of the celebrities featured in the coffee-table book Room 23, produced by Diana Jenkins and photographed by Deborah Anderson.

=== Activism ===
In 2007, Panettiere became an official supporter of Ronald McDonald House charities and was a member of its celebrity board, the Friends of RMHC. In September 2008, she launched her own line of calfskin leather bags for the company Dooney & Bourke. In October, she began to make her views known about the presidential election, releasing a satirical public service announcement (PSA) through Funny or Die. In the video, Panettiere mocked Republican candidate John McCain for his age and temper. She later made clear her intention to vote for Barack Obama and urged other young people to vote. Panettiere had long supported the District of Columbia statehood movement. In 2008, she appeared in a public service announcement with D.C.'s shadow senator, Paul Strauss, endorsing voting rights for Washington, D.C. In 2011, D.C. Mayor Vincent Gray acknowledged Panettiere's advocacy for securing full representation in the U.S. Congress for District of Columbia residents by naming a day in her honor. At the ceremony, Panettiere said it is an "unfathomable fact... it's taxation without representation in D.C., and that there's no democracy in our democracy, at the heart of it". She participated in Strauss' "51 Stars" campaign, which aimed to get 51 celebrities to endorse making Washington, D.C., the 51st state.

She was also a teen ambassador for the Candie's Foundation, whose mission is to prevent teen pregnancy. On May 6, 2009, she participated in a town hall meeting in Midtown Manhattan alongside Bristol Palin and Tampa Bay Rays pitcher Matt Garza of MLB to raise awareness of teen pregnancy. On December 6, 2013, Panettiere and Wladimir Klitschko, her fiancé at the time, visited the Euromaidan protests in Kyiv, Ukraine. Wladimir's brother, Vitali, was a leading figure of the protests. In July 2020, Panettiere advocated for victims of domestic violence to come forward and share their stories, specifically after she herself had experienced abuse.

==== Marine-life advocacy ====
On October 31, 2007, Panettiere partnered with the Whaleman Foundation to disrupt the annual dolphin hunt in Taiji, Wakayama, Japan. She was involved in a confrontation between Japanese fishermen and five other activists on surfboards from Australia and the United States, including former Home and Away actress Isabel Lucas. The confrontation lasted more than 10 minutes before the surfers were forced to return to the beach, after which they left the country. Parts of the confrontation appear in the Sundance Film Festival documentary The Cove (2009). The fishermen consider the condemnation an attack on their culture.

At a 2007 Greenpeace event in Anchorage, Alaska, Panettiere defended aboriginal whaling, saying that there is a difference between commercial whaling and the whaling practiced by aboriginal tribes in the U.S. In January 2008, she delivered letters to the Japanese, Icelandic, and Norwegian embassies in Washington, D.C., and met with diplomats, calling for an end to commercial whaling. In May 2008, she took part in an eBay auction to benefit Save the Whales Again, a campaign of the Whaleman Foundation. The auction included tickets to a fundraising dinner hosted at the Hollywood restaurant Beso, owned by Eva Longoria, and a whale-watching tour with Panettiere off the coast of Santa Barbara. Also in May 2008, during an interview with Teen Vogue, she explained how her fame gave her a platform for activism: "The show [Heroes] put me in a place to speak for things that I'm passionate about."

About two weeks before her death in 2026, she participated in a PETA advertising campaign protesting against marine mammals being held in captivity in marine parks including SeaWorld.

== Personal life ==
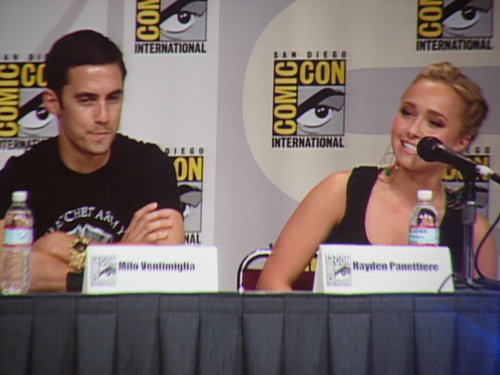
Milo Ventimiglia and Panettiere at the 2007 San Diego Comic-Con in San Diego

=== Relationships ===
Panettiere began dating her Heroes co-star Milo Ventimiglia in December 2007, when she was 18 and he was 30. They separated in February 2009.

In 2009, Panettiere met then-world heavyweight boxing champion Wladimir Klitschko at the book launch party for mutual acquaintance Diana Jenkins's Room 23, in which both Panettiere and Klitschko were featured. They soon began dating. Panettiere was ringside for Klitschko's knockout victory over Samuel Peter on September 11, 2010. In May 2011, she announced that they had separated. Both cited the long-distance nature of their relationship as the reason, and said they would remain close friends.

Panettiere and Scotty McKnight, an NFL player with the New York Jets, began dating in June 2011, and separated in December 2012.

Panettiere confirmed reports that she and Klitschko had resumed their relationship in an April 2013 interview. In October 2013, she announced her engagement to Klitschko. In December 2014, Panettiere gave birth to their daughter.

In August 2018, Panettiere's mother confirmed Panettiere and Klitschko had ended their relationship, but remained on friendly terms. Panettiere relinquished full custody of her daughter to Klitschko in 2018, amid struggles with postpartum depression and addiction. She called the decision a "living nightmare" and "heartbreaking" but necessary for her recovery. She maintained a good co-parenting relationship with Klitschko and frequently visited her daughter.

Panettiere had been in an on‑and‑off relationship with Brian Hickerson starting in 2018. He was arrested in 2019, after an alleged confrontation with her, but the case was later dismissed. In 2020, he was arrested twice on domestic violence‑related charges. In 2021, he was sentenced to 45 days in jail after pleading no contest to two felony counts of injuring a wife or girlfriend.

In May 2026, three months before her death, Panettiere released her memoir This Is Me: A Reckoning, in which she came out as bisexual and revealed that she had dated women.

=== Substance abuse and mental health problems ===
Panetierre began misusing drugs as a teenager. At age 16, she was given "happy pills" by personal assistants before awards shows and interviews. In her 20s, she turned to alcohol to manage the stress of her work schedule. She completed an alcohol rehabilitation program in 2015, but eventually relapsed. In 2020, she entered an eight-month drug and alcohol rehabilitation program after developing jaundice from alcohol-induced liver damage. Before entering rehab, doctors told her she would die within five years if she did not become sober.

In 2015, Panettiere said she had experienced postpartum depression (PPD) after her daughter's birth. In an appearance on Live with Kelly and Michael in September 2015, she said the disorder was "scary and needs to be talked about". Her depression also worsened her alcoholism and dependence upon clonazepam. She also had body dysmorphia as a result of years of body shaming by tabloid media and predatory behavior by several men in Hollywood.

=== Family ===
Panettiere's mother managed her career until she was 19. Panettiere later described their relationship as a difficult one in which she felt she had to succeed professionally to receive her mother's love; during an appearance on Jay Shetty's podcast On Purpose in May 2026, she said, "Over the years, I've tried to leave that door open, hoping that the relationship would evolve into a healthy mother-daughter relationship, and it's obvious that that's just not going to be the case." In response, Vogel told Page Six that she had chosen to "go the no contact route" with her daughter on "the advice of professionals". They were estranged at the time of Panettiere's death.

Panettiere's younger brother Jansen died in February 2023, at age 28 of aortic valve complications arising from cardiomegaly.

== Death ==
On August 16, 2026, Panettiere was found unresponsive in a Greenville, South Carolina Airbnb and in cardiac arrest around 1:51 pm. EMS arrived and, after further efforts, pronounced her dead at 2:32 pm. Following an autopsy, the Greenville County Coroner's Office announced on September 22 that the manner of death was accidental, and that the cause of death was toxic effects of fentanyl, 4-ANPP, alprazolam, methocarbamol, and quetiapine. Police are conducting a criminal investigation into dealers who might have provided Panettiere with lethal pills.

=== Tributes ===
Panettiere's former co-star, Viola Davis, called her "an amazing talent... so gifted", saying she was an "old, wise soul with such a deep heart". Bryan Fuller, who was a writer on Heroes' first season, said that she was "more than an actress, she was a muse". Panettiere's former fiancé, Wladimir Klitschko, said she had "built an incredible career through immense talent". Others in the entertainment industry including former co-stars posted tributes on social media.

== Bibliography ==
- Panettiere, Hayden (2026). This Is Me: A Reckoning. New York: Grand Central Publishing. ISBN 9781538773420. OCLC 1584363461.

== Awards and nominations ==
| Year | Association | Category | Work | Result | Ref. |
|---|---|---|---|---|---|
| 1998 | Young Artist Awards | Best Performance in a Voice Over in a Feature or TV – Best Young Actress | A Bug's Life | Nominated | |
| 1999 | Young Artist Awards | Best Performance in a TV Movie or Pilot – Young Actress Age Ten or Under | If You Believe | Nominated | |
| 1999 | Grammy Awards | Best Spoken Word Album for Children | A Bug's Life Read-Along | Nominated | |
| 2000 | Young Artist Awards | Best Performance in a Feature Film – Supporting Young Actress | Remember the Titans | Won | |
| 2001 | Young Artist Awards | Best Performance in a Feature Film – Leading Young Actress | Joe Somebody | Nominated | |
| 2004 | Young Artist Awards | Best Performance in a TV Movie, Miniseries or Special – Leading Young Actress | Tiger Cruise | Nominated | |
| 2006 | Young Artist Awards | Best Performance in a TV Series (Comedy or Drama) – Lead Actress | Heroes | Won | |
| 2007 | Saturn Awards | Best Supporting Actress on Television | Heroes | Won | |
| 2007 | Teen Choice Awards | Choice TV Actress: Drama | Heroes | Won | |
| 2007 | Teen Choice Awards | Choice TV: Breakout | Heroes | Nominated | |
| 2007 | Vail Film Festival | Breakthrough Actor of the Year Award | | Won | |
| 2007 | Newport Beach Film Festival | Feature Film Award for Acting | Shanghai Kiss | Won | |
| 2008 | Genesis Awards | Top Honor | | Won | |
| 2008 | Teen Choice Awards | Choice TV Actress: Action Adventure | Heroes | Won | |
| 2008 | Saturn Awards | Best Supporting Actress on Television | Heroes | Nominated | |
| 2009 | Saturn Awards | Best Supporting Actress on Television | Heroes | Nominated | |
| 2010 | Saturn Awards | Best Supporting Actress on Television | Heroes | Nominated | |
| 2011 | Fright Meter Awards | Best Supporting Actress | Scream 4 | Nominated | |
| 2012 | Satellite Awards | Best Actress – Television Series Drama | Nashville | Nominated | |
| 2012 | Golden Globe Awards | Best Supporting Actress – Series, Miniseries or Television Film | Nashville | Nominated | |
| 2013 | Golden Globe Awards | Best Supporting Actress – Series, Miniseries or Television Film | Nashville | Nominated | |
| 2013 | Teen Choice Awards | Choice TV Actress: Drama | Nashville | Nominated | |
| 2014 | Prism Awards | Female Performance in a Drama Series Multi-Episode Storyline | Nashville | Nominated | |
| 2015 | Teen Choice Awards | Choice TV Actress: Drama | Nashville | Nominated | |
| 2015 | People's Choice Awards | Favorite Dramatic TV Actress | Nashville | Nominated | |
| 2016 | Critics' Choice Television Awards | Best Supporting Actress in a Drama Series | Nashville | Nominated | |
