= Cory Chase =

Cory Chase may refer to:

- Cory Chase, American actress known for MILF pornography
- Cory Chase, American politician, a Democratic candidate in the 2020 West Virginia House of Delegates election
