= MILF pornography =

Sexually explicit portrayal of older actresses with younger actors

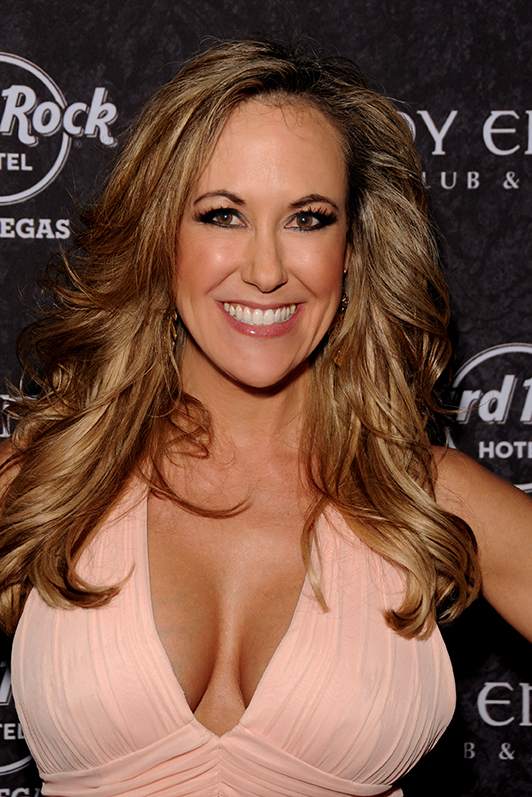
Brandi Love (40 at that time) at the AVN Awards Show, Las Vegas, Nevada on January 18, 2014

MILF pornography (short for mother I'd like/love to fuck) is a genre of pornography in which the actresses are usually women ages 30 to 60, though many actresses have started making this type of pornographic film at age 25. Central to the typical MILF narrative is an age-play dynamic of older women and younger lovers of any gender. A related term is cougar, which implies an older woman is acting as a predator.

== History ==
The term "MILF" was first documented in Internet newsgroups during the 1990s. The earliest known online reference is a 1995 Usenet post about a Playboy pictorial of attractive mothers. It was popularized by the 1999 film American Pie referring to Jennifer Coolidge's character, "Stifler's mom".

In the UK, the term yummy mummy is used as well as MILF. Oxford Dictionaries defines a yummy mummy as "an attractive and stylish young mother".

== Awards ==
Actresses of the MILF porn genre have their own awards: the X-Rated Critics Organization "MILF of the Year Award", the AVN "MILF/Cougar Performer of the Year Award", and the Urban X Award for "Best MILF Performer" among others. In Japan, Sky PerfecTV! Adult Broadcasting Awards also has an award for the "Best Mature Actress".

=== Notable performers ===
Performer	Award(s)	Year span	Wins
Alexis Fawx	AVN, Fleshbot, NightMoves, Spank Bank, XBIZ, XBIZ Creator, XCritic	2020–2025	9
Brandi Love	NightMoves, Fleshbot, Pornhub, XBIZ, XRCO	2013, 2018–2022	11
Bridgette B	NightMoves, Urban X, XBIZ, XRCO	2018–2020	7
Cherie DeVille	AVN, Pornhub, Spank Bank, XBIZ, XCritic, XRCO	2017–2025	17
Cory Chase	AVN, Fanny, FapHouse, Pornhub	2020, 2022-2023, 2025-2026	7
India Summer	AVN, XBIZ, XCritic, XRCO	2012–2015	7
Julia Ann	AVN, Miss FreeOnes, NightMoves, XBIZ, XRCO	2009–2015	9
Kendra Lust	AVN, NightMoves, Urban X, XBIZ, XRCO	2015–2025	20
Lisa Ann	AVN, Fame Registry, FAME, Fanny, NightMoves, Urban X, XBIZ, XFANZ, XRCO	2009–2014, 2019	17
Penny Barber	AVN, NightMoves, Urban X, XMA, XRCO	2024–2026	6
Tanya Tate	Fanny, NightMoves, SHAFTA, XBIZ	2010–2017	11

== See also ==
- Age disparity in sexual relationships
