= April O'Neil (disambiguation) =

April O'Neil is a Teenage Mutant Ninja Turtles character.

April O'Neil may also refer to:

- April O'Neil (actress), an American pornographic actress
- April O'Neil, an Archie Comics spin-off of Teenage Mutant Ninja Turtles Adventures
