= Aroused (film) =

2013 film by Deborah Anderson

- Theatrical release poster
- Directed by: Deborah Anderson
- Written by: Deborah Anderson
- Produced by: Deborah Anderson; Christopher Gallo; Mike Moz; Trina Venit
- Starring: Lisa Ann; Belladonna; Lexi Belle; Jesse Jane; Katsuni; Kayden Kross; Brooklyn Lee; April O'Neil; Misty Stone; Tanya Tate; Alexis Texas
- Cinematography: Christopher Gallo
- Edited by: David Schenk
- Music by: Damion Anderson; Tiziano Lugli
- Distributed by: Ketchup Entertainment
- Release date: May 1, 2013
- Running time: 73 min.
- Country: United States
- Language: English

Aroused is a 2013 feature-length documentary film directed by the photographer Deborah Anderson, in her directorial debut. It focuses on the lives and careers of 16 pornographic actresses. The film's structure includes interviews with the women both during makeup and during a subsequent photo shoot for Anderson's coffee table book of the same name as the documentary. Quotes are presented in title cards throughout the film on the topic from women including Erica Jong, Marlene Dietrich, and Gloria Leonard. The actresses interviewed describe their early upbringing, entry into sexual activity, and motivations for entering the adult film industry. A female talent agent within the industry, Fran Amidor, provides a counterpoint to the interviews. Several of the actresses recount facing stigma and discrimination due to their career choice. Katsuni reflects on the impact of entering the industry, and criticizes society's "judgment of morality".

Anderson was inspired to work on Aroused, after previously photographing an adult industry actress for a magazine shoot. She wanted to draw attention to a double standard in society regarding consumption of pornography while simultaneously stigmatizing the actresses that perform in the adult industry. She stated her attempt was to humanize and provide dignity to the actresses. Anderson cast the actresses in the film in order to showcase, "the most successful women in the adult film industry". Filming took place in Hollywood Hills, California; the film was shot in black and white, color, and muted color tones. The film premiered on May 1, 2013, at Nuart Theatre of the Landmark Theatres chain in Los Angeles. The film was released on iTunes and Amazon, followed by a DVD in June 2013.

Aroused received mixed to negative reviews. The film was compared by the Chicago Tribune to the documentary After Porn Ends with a more optimistic feel to it. Screen Daily and BroadwayWorld commented favorably on the vulnerability of the subjects. Film critics compared the documentary's style to Michael Moore, Annie Leibovitz and the film Naked Ambition: An R Rated Look at an X Rated Industry. A review of the film in the Los Angeles Times was critical, writing that it was only recommended for fans of Alexis Texas, Katsuni and Misty Stone. The Village Voice found the subject more appropriate for a photography book. The Hollywood Reporter and The Washington Post criticized Aroused for its lack of depth. The New York Times compared the film's cinematic style to an advertisement for Victoria's Secret. The New York Daily News criticized Anderson for self-promotion.

== Contents summary ==
The film profiles the lives of 16 notable adult film actresses. Anderson states at the documentary's outset, "This is not a story about pornography ... this is a story about women." A quote from Erica Jong is presented at the beginning of the film, "Everyone has talent. What is rare is the courage to follow the talent to the dark place where it leads." The documentary is broken up into two sections: an initial interview with the actresses during makeup and preparation for Anderson's companion photography book, and further interviews during the photo shoot itself. The actresses describe their personal lives and backgrounds, including their love interests and close social connections. Title cards are shown in the film with quotes on its subject matter, including Marlene Dietrich observing, "In America sex is an obsession, in other parts of the world it's a fact." Gloria Leonard is quoted stating, "The difference between pornography and erotica is lighting."

A few of the women describe less than ideal upbringing experiences in their early lives. Katsuni, a French-speaking actress of Asian background, recounts a fairly routine childhood. Adult film star, Francesca Lé, describes early problems from her parents and difficult experiences with recreational drugs. The actresses discuss initial sexual experiences and partners, and discuss their early foray into sexual activity. Some had little knowledge of sexuality or sex itself before entering the industry; others describe early lives based on very conservative religious experiences.

Desires for financial independence and ego are identified as motivating factors to join the adult industry. They recount experiencing ageism in the adult film industry, stating colleagues who had been in the business over eight years, "are already gone". The actresses state it is difficult to engage in relationships with those outside of the industry due to their views on multiple sex partners. The interviews delineate the differences from actual work on an adult film itself, to the way it is presented in the final product to the viewers. Kayden Kross explains she originally felt bashful in her youth, and purposefully constructed a character to portray within adult film to emulate perceived desires from consumers. The actresses take joy from accomplishments garnered while working in the adult film industry. Allie Haze states she wishes to be seen as one of the top performers within her field. Teagan Presley explains that due to the standards within the adult film industry including regular testing for sexually transmitted diseases, she feels they are encouraging viewers to engage in safe sex practices.

They delve into negative aspects of the adult film industry including feeling objectified by others, plastic surgery to improve their appearance for further work in the field, disagreements over their work with their relatives, contracting of sexually transmitted diseases, and abuse of recreational drugs. Anderson balances the narrative of the interviews against commentary from a talent agent for the adult film industry. Fran Amidor, a representative of actors within the industry, comments on the impact of these experiences on the talent. She states female stars in the industry frequently require mental health counseling and blur the boundaries between their on-set and off-set personalities. Such negative experiences within the industry are shown to cause stress for the performers over periods of time.

Several women recount discrimination they face due to their choice of occupation. The documentary examines the dichotomy of society's obsession with actresses in the adult film industry for sexual gratification, while simultaneously the same actresses face criticism from society for their perceived immorality. One actress tells Anderson, "They don't understand. We have fans who love us, but we have people who hate us and spit on us." Katsuni reflects on the stigma of entering the industry, lamenting society's "judgment of morality".

== Cast ==
- Lisa Ann
- Belladonna
- Lexi Belle
- Allie Haze
- Ash Hollywood
- Jesse Jane
- Katsuni
- Kayden Kross
- Francesca Lé
- Brooklyn Lee
- Asphyxia Noir
- April O'Neil
- Teagan Presley
- Misty Stone
- Tanya Tate
- Alexis Texas

== Production ==
=== Inspiration and writing ===
Prior to her work on Aroused, Anderson gained notice as a celebrity photographer with publications including Room 23 and Hollywood Erotique. Room 23 garnered her praise for her photography of celebrities including Elton John and George Clooney. Her photography work had been featured in publications including Playboy and Vanity Fair. Aroused was her first feature film. She stated her intention was to humanize sex work for the viewers and show the experiences females have to go through to work in the adult industry.

Anderson wanted the viewer to be able to get to know, "the world's most sexualized women". Anderson was initially motivated to work on the project after previously having photographed a female actress from the adult film industry for a magazine. Anderson got to know the woman, and felt impacted by the nature of her kind demeanor as contrasted against her difficult treatment from members of society due to the stigma of her line of work. Anderson's stated goal through her work on Aroused was to show the female stars of her film were genuine individuals. Anderson explained her thought process, stating, "I wanted to trim away their peacock feathers and show the real girls underneath. By peeling away these women's personas, I show that there is a human being behind the characters they play. And these human beings revel in their sexuality. That's something everyone can learn from." She asserted she wanted to draw attention to a double standard in society of consuming pornography while simultaneously criticizing female porn stars. Anderson observed, "I don't think that we should look at any of these women and judge the choices they make just because they're doing something we wouldn't do. I allow myself to express that maybe it's time to stop pointing the finger and take a look at ourselves."

=== Casting ===
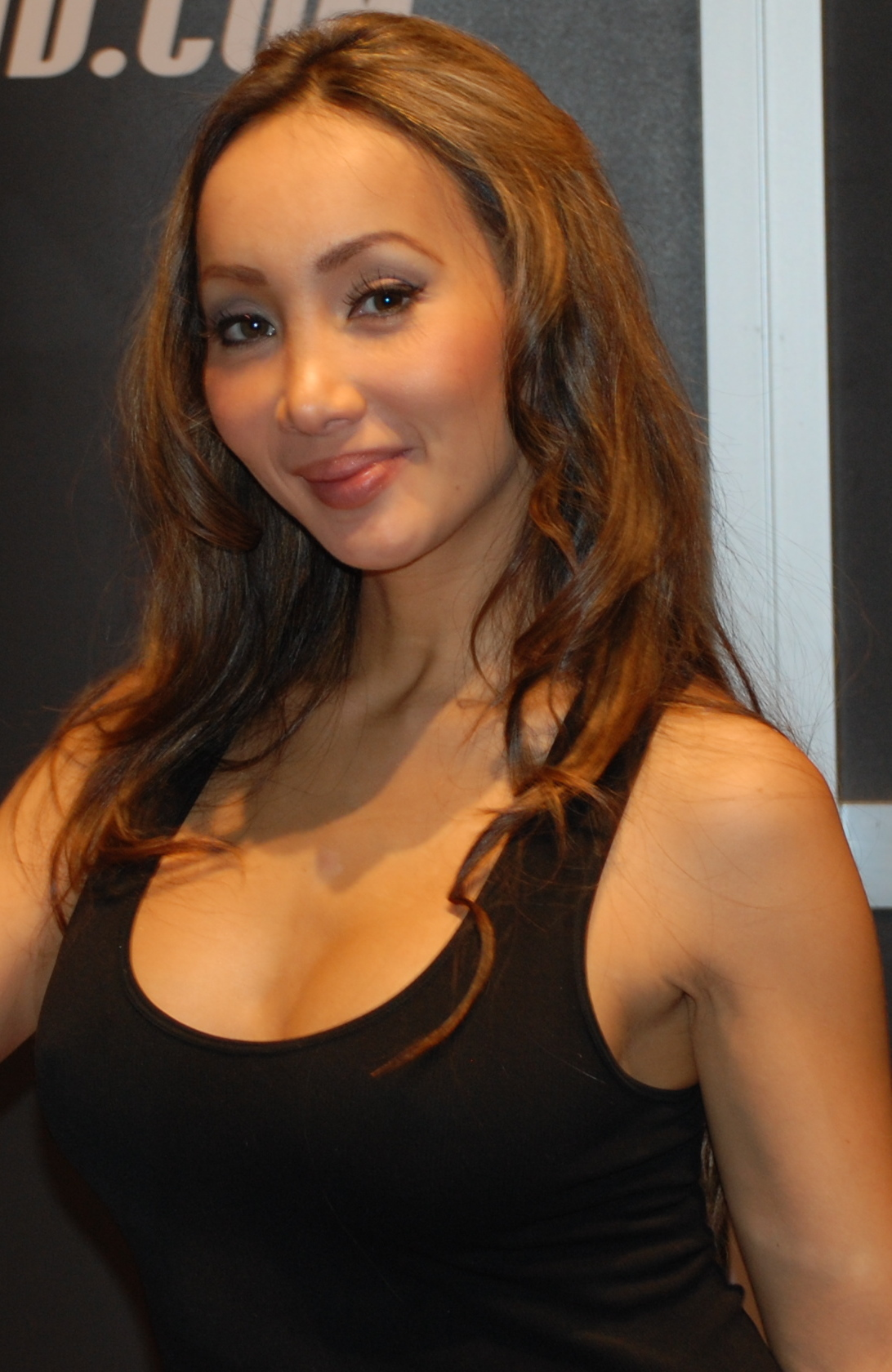
Female adult film star Katsuni reflects on the stigma of entering the industry, lamenting society's "judgment of morality".

Anderson selected her interview subjects in an attempt to feature, "the most successful women in the adult film industry". She interviewed 16 actresses from the adult film industry about their experiences and backgrounds. Anderson selected female adult film stars including: Lisa Ann, Belladonna, Lexi Belle, Allie Haze, Ash Hollywood, Jesse Jane, Katsuni, Kayden Kross, Francesca Lé, Brooklyn Lee, Asphyxia Noir, April O'Neil, Teagan Presley, Misty Stone, Tanya Tate, and Alexis Texas. Anderson additionally interviewed talent agent within the adult film industry, Fran Amidor, for her perspective on female stars within the genre. Ages of the cast members selected by Anderson were from 22 through 41 years.

Throughout the film production, Anderson gained admiration for the assertive females she interviewed for Aroused. Anderson stated she was pleased she had, "created a platform for these women to be heard." Anderson reflected she was heartened to have created a "safe space" for the actresses to open up to her, commenting, "From one woman to another, it became more of a conversation". Kayden Kross commented of being included in Aroused, "any chance we get to show that world in a way that isn't slanted or biased toward making it look like the stereotypical thing you expect from porn--any opportunity is good for us." Allie Haze stated she was optimistic the film could introduce a more varied populace to the humanity of adult film actresses, "Adult performers are always interested in being seen and heard by mainstream audiences ... The difference with Aroused is that a whole new audience could learn something from us."

=== Filming ===
During production, the film was known as Aroused, The Aroused Project, and Aroused: The Lost Sensuality of a Woman. In addition to film directing, Anderson also narrated the documentary, and placed herself within the film portraying her photography of the actresses for her erotic coffee table book. The book was intended as a companion piece to the film, and was sold stating the women featured were shown, simply attired only in footwear by Jimmy Choo. Aroused was produced by Anderson, along with Christopher Gallo. She chose to shoot the majority of the documentary in black and white. Later shots in the film are in color, and subsequently in color in muted tones. Filming was shot with the actresses in a rented residence in the Hollywood Hills, Los Angeles, California. Anderson edited the interviews together in a collage style. The director attended an adult film industry convention and shot video of herself at the event to use as video during the end credits of her documentary. Anderson chose to include quotations throughout the film from figures including Joan of Arc, Anaïs Nin, Erica Jong, Marlene Dietrich, and Eleanor Roosevelt. The majority of the film included English-language dialogue with some French with subtitles as well. The film was marketed in a movie trailer as, "an exploration of the lost sensuality of women."

== Release ==
Anderson's companion fine-art photography book associated with the film titled, Aroused: The Lost Sensuality of a Woman, was released before the film itself in 2012. The Aroused film premiere took place on May 1, 2013, at Nuart Theatre of the Landmark Theatres chain in Los Angeles. Many of the female stars of the film were present for the premiere, and stayed after the conclusion of the screening to greet guests and sign the accompanying companion coffee-table book. The documentary film was first released publicly on May 2, 2013. The film had a showing at Grauman's Chinese Theatre in Hollywood, California. Screenings were also shown in 2013 at Village East Cinema in East Village, Manhattan, West End Cinema in Washington, D.C., and Landmark Theatres in Chicago, Illinois, and San Francisco, California.

The film was simultaneously made available on iTunes, with the accompanying book sold on Amazon. The iTunes release was successful, rising to the number three spot on their "documentary most viewed list". The film was not rated by the Motion Picture Association. It was released in DVD format on June 4, 2013, distributed by Ketchup Entertainment. The DVD rendered the film in 1.78:1 anamorphic widescreen. Audio for the DVD was presented with Dolby Digital 5.1. The DVD included a movie trailer for the film itself. In 2020, Aroused was featured on Amazon Prime and the TV network Showtime in the United States.

== Reception ==
Aroused received mixed to negative reviews. On the review aggregator Rotten Tomatoes, it holds a 31% approval rating.

Critics who liked the film generally credited Deborah Anderson with a sympathetic approach to her subjects. Matt Pais of the Chicago Tribune thought it presented the women as people rather than objects, and found it more optimistic about the industry than the documentary After Porn Ends. Mark Adams of Screen Daily called it an unconventional and insightful look at the adult film industry, and said Anderson drew out a candour and charm in the women that their screen personas conceal. Randy Steinberg of Blast Magazine likened Anderson to Michael Moore and judged the film effective at reducing the stigma around the women's work, while James Plath of Movie Metropolis compared her photography to that of Annie Leibovitz for treating its subjects with dignity. Brent Simon of Shared Darkness described it as an intelligent portrait of the inner lives of 16 women, and Mae Abdulbaki of Punch Drunk Critics praised it as a strong directorial debut.

Other reviewers were more divided. John Delia of ACED Magazine admired the cinematography but thought the film took the women's side too readily, and suggested it mainly served to promote Anderson's companion photography book. AllMovie's Jason Buchanan rated it two stars out of five.

The most critical reviews focused on a lack of depth. Sheri Linden of the Los Angeles Times wrote that a film promising to reveal the "true essence" of its subjects spent most of its time on surfaces, and thought only devoted fans of performers such as Alexis Texas, Katsuni and Misty Stone would be satisfied. The Village Voice felt the material suited Anderson's photography better than a narrative film, since the interviews were cut too finely for any of the women to emerge as a distinct personality. Frank Scheck of The Hollywood Reporter called it a glossy curiosity without much depth, and Michael O'Sullivan of The Washington Post found it moving in places but ultimately unsatisfying.

Some critics objected to the film's style and motives. Nicole Herrington of The New York Times compared its look to a Victoria's Secret advertisement, argued that the music and camera work objectified the women, and thought it would have worked better as a television series, though she credited the women's thoughtful responses with carrying it. Gabe Toro of IndieWire described it as a polished advertisement for the industry that serves mainly as a rebuttal to alarmist news coverage of pornography. Elizabeth Weitzman of the New York Daily News accused Anderson of using the film for self-promotion.

== See also ==
- List of documentary films
- Anti-pornography movement in the United States
- Feminist pornography
- Feminist views of pornography
- Free Speech Coalition
- Hot Girls Wanted
- The Naked Feminist
- Not a Love Story: A Film About Pornography
- Pornography in the United States
- Sex-positive movement
- Sex-positive feminism
- Thinking XXX
- Women's erotica
- Women's pornography
