= Richard Steinberg =

Richard Steinberg may refer to:

- Richard Harold Steinberg (born 1960), former Assistant General Counsel to the U.S Trade Representative, current Professor of Law at UCLA
- Richard L. Steinberg (born 1972), former member of the Florida House of Representatives

== See also ==
- Dick Steinberg, American football executive
