= Miles Mobility =

German car-sharing company

Miles Mobility (abbreviation: Miles; official spelling: MILES) is an independent mobility provider headquartered in Berlin. The company offers free-floating carsharing, long-term rentals, and car subscriptions.

== History ==
Miles, formerly known as drive by:., was founded in 2016 by Alexander Eitner and Florian Haus. The company launched its first car sharing vehicles in Berlin in 2017. In autumn 2019, Oliver Mackprang and Eyvindur Kristjansson joined the management team. In autumn 2022, Miles acquired Volkswagen's car sharing service WeShare and integrated it into its own platform. Since 2022, Miles has also offered car subscriptions throughout Germany.

In early 2024, Miles received media attention following incidents of vandalism affecting its vehicles. The lower stroke of the letter “E” in the logo was removed or covered, particularly on vans, causing the brand name to appear as “MILFS.”

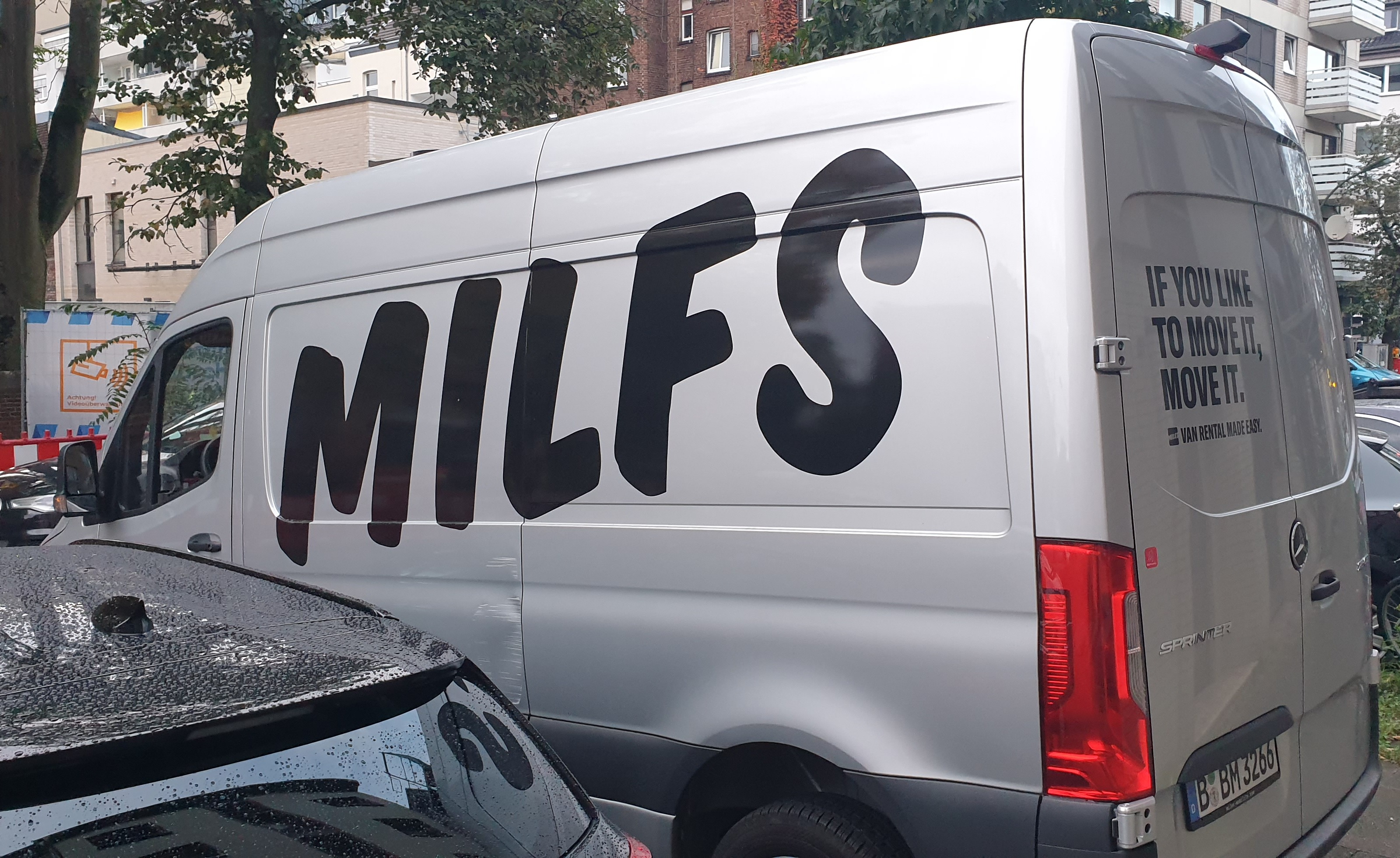
Modified “MILFS” lettering on a Miles transporter in Düsseldorf

According to the German Carsharing Association, Miles was among the leading car sharing providers in Germany in 2025.

Since its founding, Miles has continuously supported charitable organizations and projects with monetary and in-kind donations through its "Miles Charity" initiative. In the winter of 2022, the company partnered with the campaign "One Warm Winter" to equip its vehicles with emergency boxes ("warmth kits") that users could distribute to homeless individuals. Currently, 22 of the more than 18,000 vehicles are designated charity vehicles whose profits are donated.

== Services ==
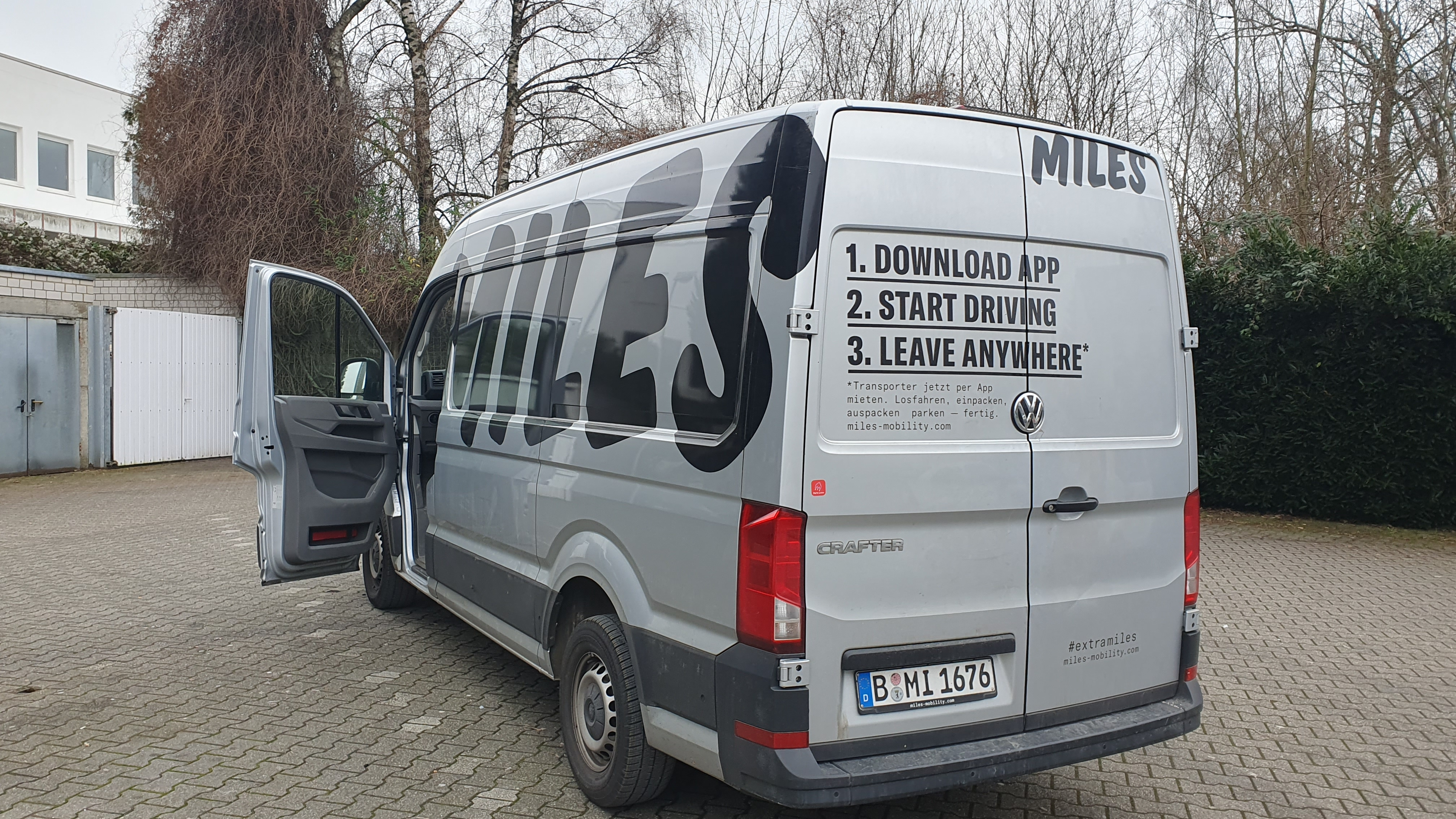
Miles Transporter in Bochum

=== Fleet ===
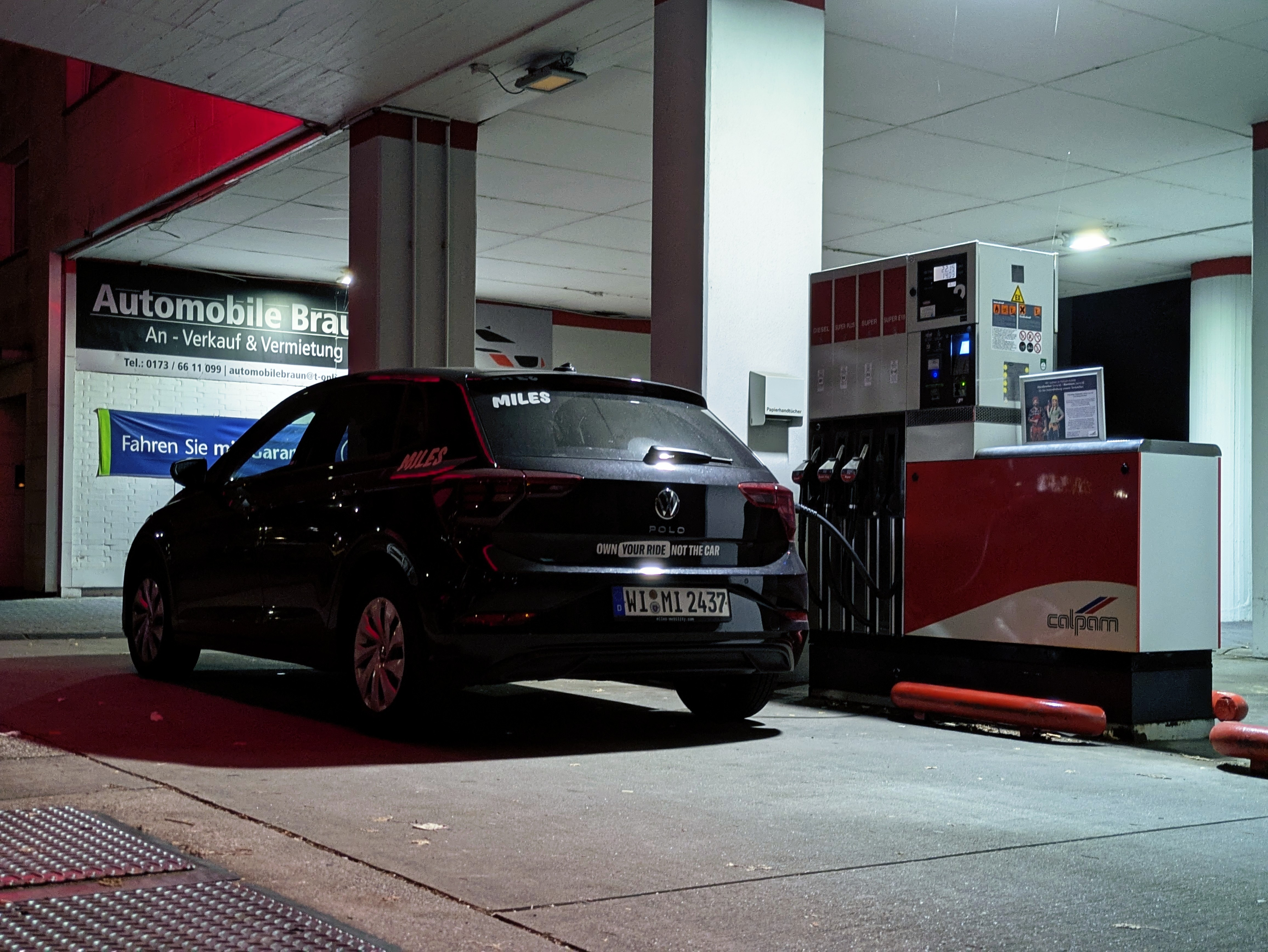
Miles' VW Polo refueling at a partner gas station

As of 2025, the Miles fleet included more than 18,000 vehicles. The company offers a range of models to suit different market niches, including electric vehicles.

=== Locations ===
Miles operates in 14 cities in Germany. Over 2022 and 2025, Miles expanded into the Belgian cities of Ghent, Brussels and Antwerp. On March 11, 2025, the company announced its withdrawal from Belgium, citing persistent vandalism and a high number of attempted thefts, particularly in Brussels. At the time of its withdrawal, Miles operated 1,400 vehicles and reported 180,000 registered users in Belgium.

Since August 2025, Miles has operated in Mönchengladbach as part of a pilot project. The service was introduced on a temporary basis during the European Hockey Championship, and was later made permanent. During the initial ten-day test period, approximately 200 trips were completed, including 90 between Mönchengladbach and Düsseldorf.

=== Impact ===
In 2025, the Schreier Institute published a study on the effects of free-floating car sharing in Munich, Hamburg, and Cologne. The study surveyed 1,139 Miles users. Based on the methodology of the German Carsharing Association, a single Miles vehicle can replace up to 23 privately owned cars. If free-floating car sharing were discontinued, the average number of cars per household would increase by 0.4 vehicles.

=== Car subscription ===
Subscription vehicles can be rented via a dedicated website for flexible periods ranging from two to 24 months. The subscription price includes insurance, taxes, and maintenance.

== Controversies ==
From October 2023 to December 2025, authorities investigated suspected underpayment of parking fees amounting to up to 30 million euros. In December 2025, the Berlin public prosecutor's office imposed a fine of 25 million euros for underpaid parking fees. The decision became legally binding after the company paid the fine and waived its right to appeal.
