= SHAFTA Awards (adult video) =

British pornography award

SHAFTA
- Awarded for: Popularity in UK pornographic films.
- Location: London
- Country: United Kingdom
- Presented by: Television X
- Reward: Trophy
- First award: 9 March 2010; 16 years ago
- Final award: Present
- Website: http://www.shafta.xxx

Television/radio coverage
- Network: Television X

The SHAFTA Awards ("Soft and Hard Adult Film and Television Awards") are an annual film award ceremony for pornographic films in the United Kingdom, described by the organisers of the event as the "UK Oscars of Porn", while AVN state it is the highlight of the British adult film calendar.

Voting is open to any subscriber of Television X. As winners are determined by fan votes, nominees have used social media to encouraging people to vote for them. The term SHAFTA was chosen as a portmanteau of BAFTA and penis shaft, with the full name being a backronym.

== History ==
The first SHAFTA ceremony was held in 2010 and it was organised by Television X. The 2011 SHAFTAs were held in London on 9 March at the For Your Eyes Only club. Celebrities attending the event included Billi Bhatti, Dane Bowers and Tim Westwood. The 2012 SHAFTAs were held on 15 March at Platinum Lace, which is a strip club on Coventry Street in London. The event was hosted by Tanya Tate, who won the MILF of the Year award for the third year in a row. A minor controversy was caused when transsexual star Holly Harlow was nominated for Best New Starlet, but Television X defended the choice stating that "the term starlet fits her perfectly, she is feminine, sexy and a great performer". Award presenters included Danny Dyer, Lethal Bizzle and Terry Coldwell from East 17. ICM Registry co-sponsored the event along with Television X, and the event was streamed live on the awards' official website. Ben Dover was presented with an honorary award, entitled The Palm Phwoar for "endeavours in adult entertainment" over his 33 years in the industry. The 2013 SHAFTAs were held on 5 December at the Rise Superclub in Leicester Square. The 2016 SHAFTAs were held at The Rah Rah Room on London's Piccadilly and hosted by Benedict Garrett. The 1920s themed event was attended by the UK press, porn industry and celebrity guests including Big Brother housemate Marco Pierre White Jr and Geordie Shore's Marty McKenna and David Hawley.

== Winners ==
| | 2010 | 2011 | 2012 | 2013 | 2016 | 2018 |
| Female Performer of the Year | Syren Sexton | Syren Sexton | Megan Coxxx | Angel Long | Jess West | Alessa Savage |
| Male Performer of the Year | DemetriXXX | Pascal White | Danny D | Danny D | Pascal White | Pascal White |
| Best New Starlet | Kerry Louise | Megan Coxxx | Paige Turnah | Yuffie Yulan | Chessie Kay | Sophie Anderson |
| MILF of the Year | Tanya Tate | Tanya Tate | Tanya Tate | Tanya Tate | Rebecca More | Rebecca More |
| Best Director | Angel Long and Pure XXX | Pure XXX | — | — | — | — |
| Best Interracial Series | Keisha Kane Extreme and Insane | — | — | — | — | — |
| Best Spoof Series | Life in Bras | Frustrated Housewives | A Royal Romp | — | I’m a Porn Star, Get Me Out of Here | — |
| Best Series | Power Girls | Tanya Tate's Sex Tour of Ireland | Lara's Anal Adventure | Pervacious Mind of Angel Long | Angel Long’s Dirty Mouth | Dr Lacey Sex Therapist |
| Best Sex Scene | Mummy Mia | Diamond Geezers | Angel Long's Porn Apprentice | — | Rebecca More GobbleCocks | Rhiannon Ryder and Pascal White Breaking Bad Bitches |
| Best Amateur Series | — | — | — | Tanya Tate's Sex Tour of Ireland | Big Boobie Newbies | — |
| TVX Cherry Pop | — | — | — | — | — | Tindra Frost |
| Best New Series | — | — | — | Weird Science XXX | — | — |
| Televisionx.com Fan Fave | — | — | — | — | — | Zara DuRose |
| Best Girl Girl Series | — | — | — | Linsey Dawn McKenzie: I'm Back | — | — |
| Most Outrageous Scene | Calling the Shots | Deadly Sins of Mistress Sinclair | The Only Way Is Sex | — | — | — |
| Most Outrageous Series | — | — | — | Mummy's Got Milk | — | — |
| Best Anal Scene | Girls Allowed | The Pervacious Mind of Angel Long | Lara's Anal Adventure | — | — | — |
| Best Girl Girl Scene | — | — | — | — | Jasmine Jae and Sienna Day The Real 50 Shades | — |
| Best Group Scene | — | — | — | — | Michelle Thorne’s D.P. Fantasies | — |
| Foreign Performer of the Year | — | Angell Summers | Angel Rivas | — | — | — |
| Best Character | Jim Slip | Lara Latex | — | Lara Latex | — | — |
| Best BBW | — | — | — | — | — | Estella Bathory |
| Best Online Scene | — | Liselle Bailey | — | — | — | — |
| Best Reality/Gonzo Series | — | — | Tanya Tate's Sex Tour of Scotland | — | — | — |
| Best Studio | — | — | Kaizen XXX | — | — | Angel Long Entertainments |
| The Palm Phwoar | — | — | Ben Dover | Anna Span | — | — |
| Lifetime Achievement Award | — | — | — | — | Ric Porter | Amory Peart |
| "—" denotes the award was not presented that year | | | | | | |
