= Diana Jenkins =

Bosnian entrepreneur and philanthropist

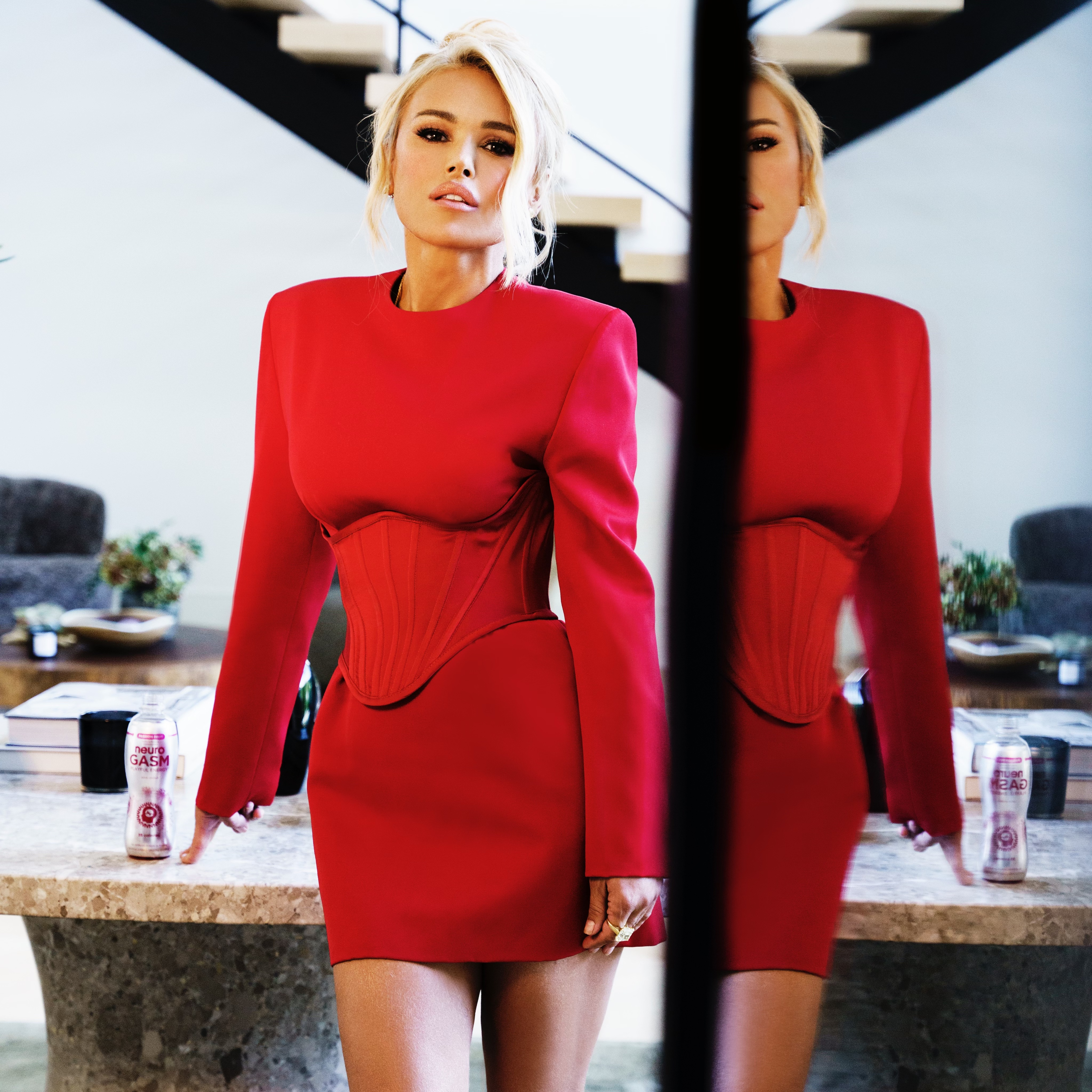
- Born: Sanela Dijana Ćatić; 1973 (age 52–53); Sarajevo, SR Bosnia and Herzegovina, SFR Yugoslavia
- Education: University of Sarajevo; City University, London (BS)
- Occupations: Entrepreneur; philanthropist
- Notable work: Room 23
- Spouse: Roger Jenkins (m. 1999; div. 2011)
- Children: 4
- Website: dianajenkins.com

Diana Jenkins (born Sanela Dijana Ćatić; 1973) is a Bosnian philanthropist, activist, and entrepreneur. Jenkins fled her home country Bosnia and Herzegovina during the siege of Sarajevo and immigrated to London, where she studied at City University, London.

== Early life and Escape from Sarajevo ==
Jenkins was born Sanela Dijana Catic in Sarajevo, then a part of the Socialist Republic of Bosnia and Herzegovina within Yugoslavia, to a Bosian parents Smajo Ćatić, an economist, and Rasida Ćatić, an accountant. The eldest of two children, she grew up communist Muslim.

Upon completing her degree in Marxian economics at the University of Sarajevo, the 1992 Siege of Sarajevo commenced. Without her family, she fled Sarajevo through a refugee convoy, crawling through an underground tunnel beneath an airport that took her to the Croatian port of Rijeka. After spending roughly 18 months in Croatia, she emigrated to London in 1993, settling in Brixton.

It was in London that she found jobs in Covenant Garden, working as a cleaner and salesclerk to help pay for English lessons at night school. In 1995, eight days before the end of the Bosnian war, her 21-year-old brother, Irnis, was killed by paramilitaries. Shortly after, she applied to City University, London, where she studied computer science and graduated with a Bachelor of Science degree and high honors in math and science.

== Philanthropic activities ==
Jenkins established The Irnis Catic Foundation in 2002 in memory of her brother who was killed during the Bosnian War. The foundation provides funding to the medical facilities at the University of Sarajevo. In 2009, Jenkins was awarded the Peace Connection prize by the Center for Peace and Multi-Ethnic Cooperation for her humanitarian work.

Jenkins established The Sanela Diana Jenkins International Justice Clinic at the University of California, Los Angeles (UCLA) School of Law through a $4 million endowment in August 2008. Centered on human rights, the clinic focused on legal and political advocacy and documentation. Along with Richard Steinberg, Jenkins hosted the Sanela Diana Jenkins Clinic on Gender Violence in Eastern Congo. The Clinic established the Restore the Village Project, a series of humanitarian interventions in villages affected by mass rape attacks, and is studying the effects of these interventions in order to determine how to best help communities in need and better understand the phenomenon of mass rape. In 2013, the clinic was recognized by The Computerworld Honors Program for its establishment in the online forum world.

In December 2008, Diana and husband Roger Jenkins co-hosted a charity event with actor George Clooney, which raised £10 million for Darfur, Sudan refugees. In February 2009, Jenkins published her risqué coffee table photo book, Room 23. Conceptualized and photographed by Deborah Anderson, the photoshoot, originally shot in late 2007, gathered Jenkins, George Clooney, Cindy Crawford, Lindsay Lohan, Elton John, and Sharon Stone amongst 100 celebrities inside the penthouse suite at The Peninsula Hotel in Beverly Hills. Proceeds from the book benefited her human rights clinic at UCLA.

Immediately following the January 2010 Haiti earthquake, Jenkins partnered with actor Sean Penn to establish the Jenkins-Penn Haitian Relief Organization, initially pledging $1 million on their first time meeting to support the cause. Within days, the team traveled to Port-au-Prince to deliver hospital supplies and provide medical care to displaced Haitians. After spending two weeks in Haiti, Jenkins returned to America to coordinate flights for victims and organize a fundraiser for the Clinton Foundation, which helped raise over $1 million. Though the partnership dissolved shortly after arriving to Haiti due to cognitive differences, Jenkins continued to advocate the need for basic humanitarian aid, and disputed that the U.S. military leave the country prematurely.

In March 2010, Jenkins posted £300,000 bail for former President of the Federation of Bosnia and Herzegovina Ejup Ganić, who was detained in London on a Serbian extradition request. In October 2012, Elton John honored Jenkins with the Enduring Vision Award at his annual AIDS Foundation Benefit for her activism in the fight against AIDS, having been an active fundraiser since first attending the foundation's White Tie and Tiara Ball in 2003. In September 2013, Jenkins was awarded the Isa-beg Ishaković Award for Patriotism at the Sarajevo National Theatre. In 2014, Jenkins supported the Save the Elephants organization by underwriting the fundraising cost for the Elephant Crisis Fund, which raised $2.1 million.

In October 2015, Jenkins partnered with Bosnian supermarket chain Amko Komerc to donate food to Syrian refugees in Beldrage. On May 5, 2018, Jenkins was honored at the Advisory Council for Bosnia & Herzegovina Gala in Washington, D.C. for her continued support and philanthropic activities in the country. Upon founding the non-profit Sunela Foundation in 2022, Jenkins donated $100,000 which benefited the families and relatives of the 189 victims of the 2018 Lion Air Flight 601.

== Other ventures ==
After graduating with a degree in computer science and economics from City University, London, Jenkins acquired the swimwear line Melissa Odabash. In 2009, Jenkins founded the low-calorie beverage company Neuro. By May 2009, the brand had expanded from Los Angeles to London and New York. In September, NeuroAqua, a magnesium water, and Neuro Juniors line of children vitamins were launched. The line of functional beverages are based in Sherman Oaks, California where she is President and CEO.

In 2012, Jenkins founded the music label, D Empire Entertainment.

In December 2021, Jenkins was announced as a series regular on the Bravo network's reality show The Real Housewives of Beverly Hills for its twelfth season. In January 2023, Jenkins announced her departure from the series after only one season due to her second pregnancy being high risk.

Jenkins and D Empire Entertainment produced Sevap / Mitzvah which was released in 2023. Sevap / Mitzvah won best short film at the Humanitas Awards in October of 2023.

== Personal life ==
Jenkins met banker and Barclays Bank executive Roger Jenkins at the gym at the Barbican, where he was living after the end of his marriage to his first wife. The two married in 1999. After Diana was credited for persuading Sheik Hamad bin Jassim al-Thani of the Qatari royal family into investing £7.3 billion into Barclays in 2008, the couple was dubbed "The 'Posh and Becks' of International Finance" by Business Insider. The pair quietly separated in late 2009 before announcing their divorce in January 2011. During their 10 year marriage, they had two children together, a son, Innis, and a daughter, Eneya. In 2013, The Times ranked Jenkins No. 3 on their "10 Richest Divorcees" list for her divorce settlement of £150 million.

Jenkins met musician Asher Monroe in 2012, when Monroe signed to Jenkins' D Empire Entertainment record label. In 2020, Jenkins and Monroe welcomed their first child together, a daughter, Eliyanah. The couple subsequently announced their engagement. Jenkins later suffered a miscarriage. In August 2023, Jenkins gave birth to a baby girl, Elodie Mae Book.

She's had properties in California, Sarajevo, Hvar, and a home in London, which was designed by Giorgio Armani.

Upon her move to America from London, Jenkins purchased her cliff-top Malibu mansion for $21 million in 2005. She listed the property 2020 for $125 million, before selling it to entrepreneur Jan Koum for $87 million in 2021; the sale marked the third most expensive real estate deal in Los Angeles of the year. Roughly two years after purchasing her $13 million Hidden Hills home in 2021, she listed the 13,211 square-foot home in 2023 for $20.5 million before selling it in 2026 for $23 million; Jenkins subsequently announced her departure from America to Sarajevo following the death of her father.
