= Tanya Tate =

English model and pornographic film actress (born 1979)

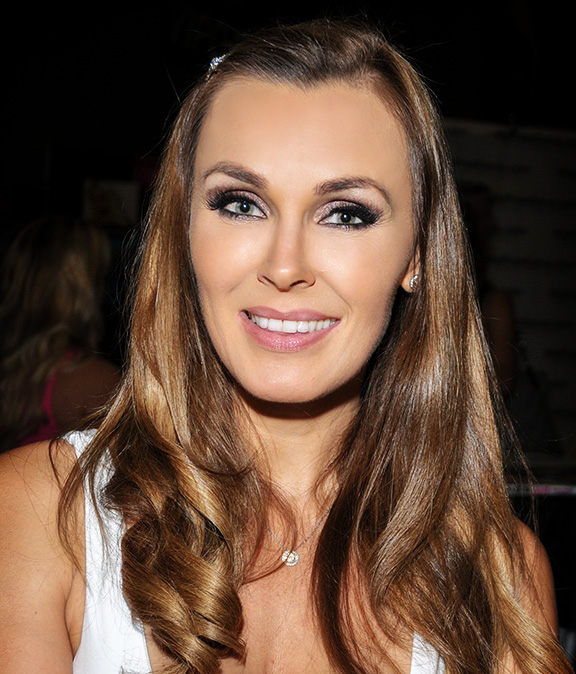
- Tate in 2015
- Occupations: Glamour model; writer; international cosplayer; pornographic film actress
- Years active: 2009–present
- Website: tanyatate.com

Tanya Tate is an English glamour model, writer, international cosplayer, and pornographic film actress. In 2023, she was inducted into the XRCO Hall of Fame.

== Career ==
After beginning her porn career in 2009, Tate began contributing to a regular column for British adult magazine Ravers DVD in 2010. Her alliterative stage name is inspired by her interest in comic books and how Stan Lee similarly named his characters. She is perhaps best known for her contributions to the MILF genre, with eleven MILF of the Year wins. Tate is also known for her appearances in porn parodies such as Game of Bones (an adult parody of Game of Thrones), The Incredible Hulk XXX, and Iron Man XXX.

Later that same year Tate made headlines in Ireland, after it was discovered that one of the amateur men who participated in the filming of her Television X series Tanya Tate's Sex Tour of Ireland, was Gaelic Athletic Association player Greg Jacobs. Tate travelled the countryside in a camper van meeting genuine Irish men and filmed both softcore and hardcore pornography. Jacobs denied that he appeared in the video, but then admitted, "I don't regret doing it", noting that he didn't want his parents to know. He appeared in the video following a dare from his friends. Tanya Tate's Casting Couch series ended in March 2013.

Tate directed her first film for Filly Films called Tanya Tate's the MILF Masseuse in 2011. Her work as director for Filly Films continued in 2012 with two titles Tanya Tate's Runaways and Tanya Tate's Tea & Muffin Party.

Tate is outspoken about her industry and was quoted in a story about the 2013 AVN Awards for which she was nominated for an award. She stated, "If you are more popular with the fans, companies are more likely to book you for their production", and that "Being nominated for awards help build your recognition with your fan base. People that win male and female performer of the year are generally solid consistent talent that are open to many 'levels,' and some of these performers already have higher basic rates than others".

On 5 December 2013, Tate was the host of the 4th annual SHAFTA Awards at the Rise Superclub in Leicester Square. She was also nominated for several awards that night and won MILF of the Year for the fourth year running. Then in January 2014, Tate was France's Hot Vidéo magazine correspondent conducting red-carpet interviews at the AVN Awards.

=== Cosplay ===
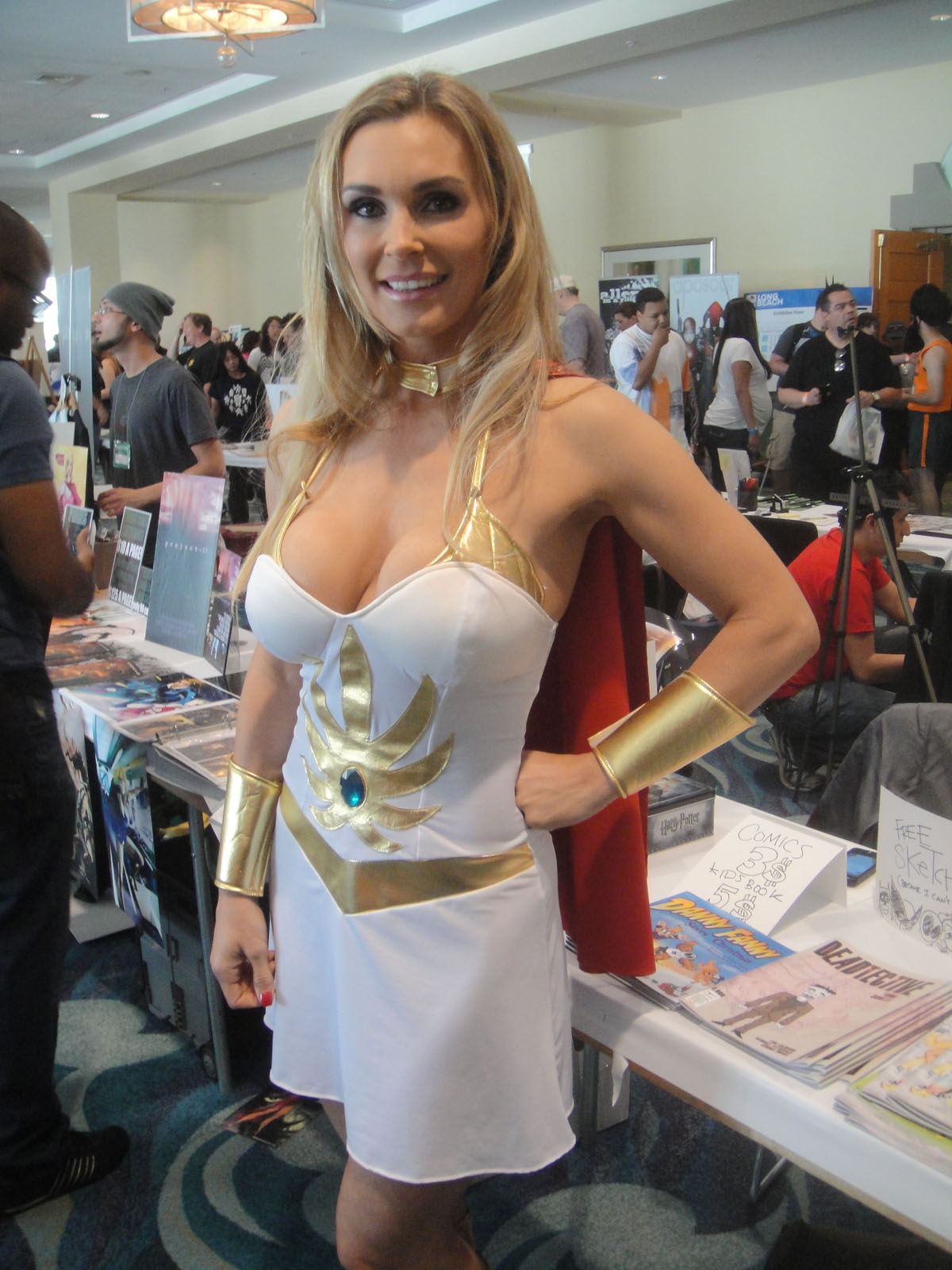
Tate at the Long Beach Comic Expo as She-Ra, 2012

Since her 2010 San Diego ComicCon convention debut dressed as Emma Frost, Tate has gained the attention of several media outlets, from Life.com, Getty Images, KTLA.com and the Orange County Register to Bleeding Cool, NerdReactor.com, Cosmic Book News and GirlsGoneComic.com, as a cosplayer. Earlier in the year, Tate was featured by IGN.com in an interview article called Tanya Tate: Cosplayer Extraordinaire. In that interview, she explains how the stage name she uses for her adult industry performances was inspired by how comic book writer Stan Lee named his characters using the same letter in their first and last names. Tate was also named the Cosplay Girl of the Month by ComicImpact.com in April and in June was selected as Critiques4Geeks.com's first ever Geek Babe of the Month.

Tate's 2010 ComicCon appearance also resulted in the publishing of her first book, Tanya Tate: My Life in Costume. Tate has become a contributing writer for the websites WorldOfSuperheroes.com and Geekscape.net. In 2011, as part of her interest in cosplay and in conjunction with that year's ComicCon convention, Tate launched a costume design contest. The winning entrant won a lunch date with Tate during Comic-Con.

=== Appearances ===
In 2013, Tate was the cover model for the Turkish version of FHM magazine. Also that year, she was featured in two documentaries. The first was Deborah Anderson's feature documentary and accompanying art book, Aroused (ISBN 978-0-9893744-0-8), a theatre-released film profiled the lives of several adult industry performers during the production of Anderson's photobook of the same name. It was released in cinemas in the US summer 2013 and internationally in January 2014. The second was for the United Kingdom-broadcast Channel 4 television show Date My Porn Star, where a film crew accompanied one of Tate's fans from Britain to her home in Los Angeles to meet the performer.

=== Other ventures ===
In early 2011, Tate was a regular on Babestation, Studio66 and Red Light Central.

Since 2011 she has operated a cosplay-themed website and blog called justalottatanya.com. Tate also operates a publicity company.

In 2013, Tate began several partnerships and cooperative ventures. She announced a line of action figures, unveiled a co-created comic book character, and syndicated blogs for HollywoodGoneGeek.com and FirstComicsNews.com. In April 2014, Tate's Lady Titan was introduced at that year's WonderCon pop-culture convention in Anaheim, California.

In March 2014, a collaboration was announced between Tate and the newly launched cougars.xxx website owned by the Luxembourg based Lilly Devine SA company. CEO Moriam Hassan Balogun commented, "Tanya is not only an established professional with great ideas and a total understanding of what MILF fans want but also a major favourite within the industry". Then in April 2014, Tate began hosting a live weekly radio show on the Vivid radio channel of the Sirius XM Radio network called the Tanya Tate Show.

Tate debuted her latest line of action figures, a customizable vinyl figure line called My Hero Toys, in October 2014. The new line of figures was announced at Stan Lee's annual event, the Comikaze Expo in Los Angeles.

== Advocacy ==
In 2012, Tate appeared on behalf of the Free Speech Coalition at a press conference for the "No on Government Waste" Committee, which opposed Los Angeles County's Measure B; the mandatory condom and health permit initiative.

With regard to Measure B, Tate was quoted in a San Fernando Valley Business Journal article to the effect that she would want whomever she decided to have sex with "to get tested until I felt comfortable to sleep with them without a condom," adding that AIDS Healthcare Foundation president Michael Weinstein (whom the article was about), "should be spending money on treating [AIDS] and educating regular people about how to protect themselves instead of going after a small community that is aware of the risks".

In response to Samuel Jackson's comments about RedTube, the free porn-sharing website, at a May press conference for his 2014 movie Captain America: The Winter Soldier, Tate said that piracy impacts her directly because she produces her own web content. She stated, "I would gladly send a catalog of adult movies I have directed to Mr. Jackson if he would be so kind as to recant the comment".

In December 2014, Tate was outspoken regarding new regulations imposed on online content in the United Kingdom. In an interview she stated, "Female ejaculation being banned is not only a slap in the face to women across the UK, but proof that men making these rules do not see women as equals. The lads can enjoy a good pop shot, but should a woman come, all hell breaks loose". Another item listed as banned content was "Role-playing as non-adults" which prompted Tate to state, "Can you say, 'Oh you're a naughty boy?' Or can you not say that because you cannot role-play as non-adults? Can you call someone a 'naughty boy' or do you have to say 'naughty man?' Who is going to monitor this?"

== Awards and nominations ==
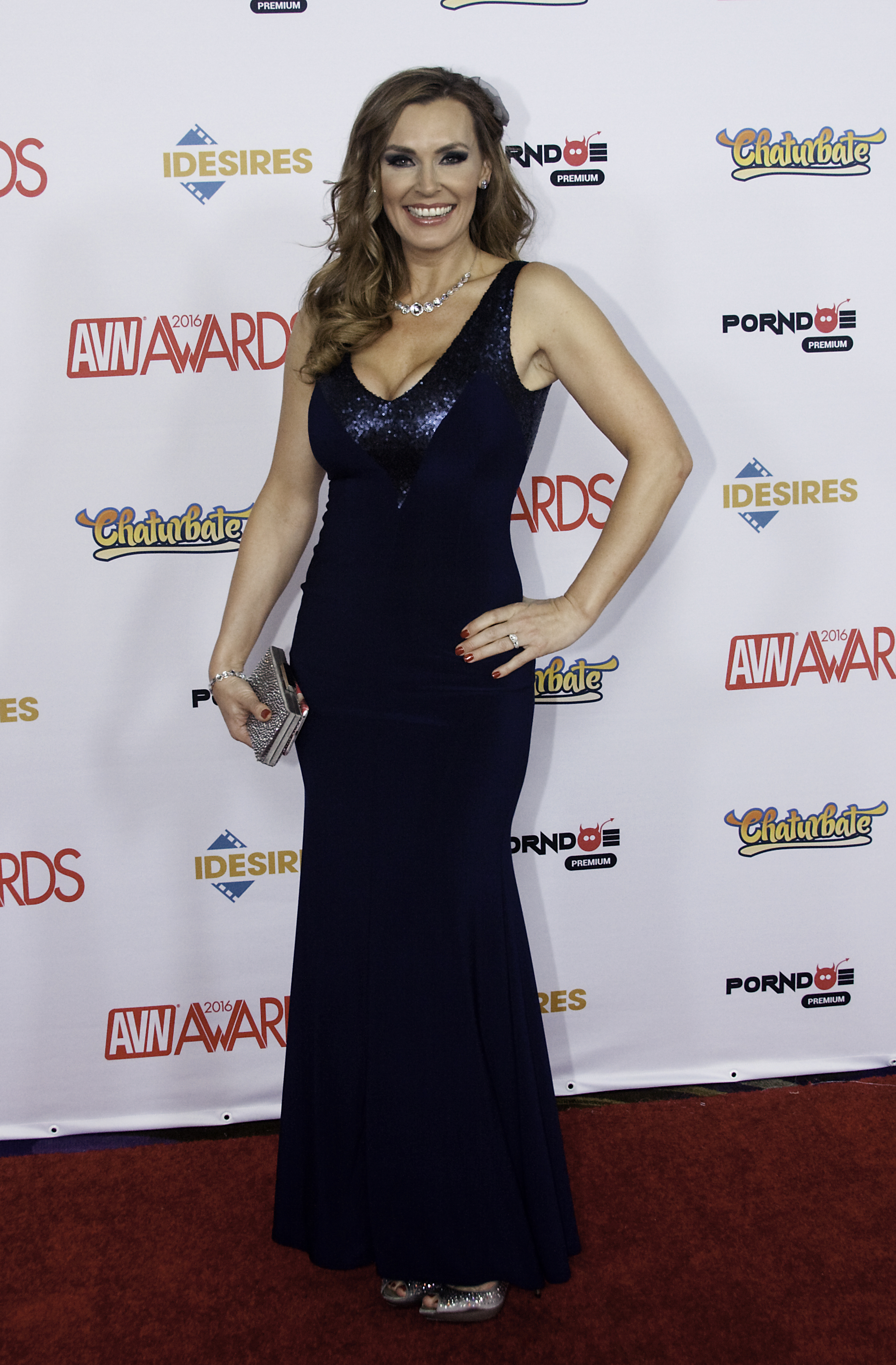
Tate at the AVN Awards in 2016

Year	Ceremony	Result	Award	Work
2010	NightMoves Award	Won	Best MILF Performer (Editor's Choice)	—N/a
2010	SHAFTA Award	Won	MILF of the Year	—N/a
2010	SHAFTA Award	Won	Best Sex Scene (with Wayne Scott Fox)	Mummy Mia
2011	AVN Award	Nominated	MILF/Cougar Performer of the Year	—N/a
2011	SHAFTA Award	Won	MILF of the Year	—N/a
2011	SHAFTA Award	Won	Best Series	Tanya Tate's Sex Tour of Ireland
2011	XBIZ Award	Nominated	MILF Performer of the Year	—N/a
2011	XRCO Award	Nominated	MILF of the Year	—N/a
2012	AVN Award	Nominated	MILF/Cougar Performer of the Year	—N/a
2012	NightMoves Award	Won	Best MILF Performer (Editor's Choice)	—N/a
2012	SHAFTA Award	Won	MILF of the Year	—N/a
2012	SHAFTA Award	Won	Best Reality/Gonzo Series	Tanya Tate's Sex Tour of Scotland
2012	XBIZ Award	Nominated	MILF Performer of the Year	—N/a
2012	XRCO Award	Nominated	MILF of the Year	—N/a
2013	AVN Award	Nominated	Crossover Star of the Year	—N/a
2013	AVN Award	Nominated	MILF/Cougar Performer of the Year	—N/a
2013	SHAFTA Award	Won	Best MILF	—N/a
2013	SHAFTA Award	Won	Best Amateur Series	Tanya Tate's Sex Tour of Ireland
2013	XBIZ Award	Won	MILF Performer of the Year	—N/a
2013	XBIZ Award	Nominated	Best Supporting Actress	Spartacus MMXII The Beginning
2013	XRCO Award	Nominated	MILF of the Year	—N/a
2013	XRCO Award	Nominated	Mainstream Adult Media Favorite	—N/a
2014	AVN Award	Nominated	Best All-Girl Group Sex Scene (with Belle Noire & Veronica Avluv)	College Cuties Seduce MILF Beauties
2014	AVN Award	Nominated	Mainstream Star of the Year	—N/a
2014	AVN Award	Nominated	MILF Performer of the Year	—N/a
2014	NightMoves Award	Won	Best MILF Performer (Editor's Choice)	—N/a
2014	XBIZ Award	Nominated	MILF Performer of the Year	—N/a
2014	XBIZ Award	Nominated	Best Scene - Vignette Release (with James Deen)	MILFS Seeking Boys 3
2014	XBIZ Award	Nominated	Web Star of the Year	—N/a
2014	XRCO Award	Nominated	MILF of the Year	—N/a
2014	XRCO Award	Nominated	Mainstream Adult Media Favorite	—N/a
2014	Fanny Award	Won	MILF Performer of the Year	—N/a
2015	AVN Award	Nominated	Best Sex Scene in a Foreign-Shot Production (with Roxy Mendez & Lexi Lowe)	Brit School Brats 2
2015	XBIZ Award	Nominated	Girl/Girl Performer of the Year	—N/a
2015	XBIZ Award	Nominated	MILF Performer of the Year	—N/a
2015	XBIZ Award	Nominated	Best Actress—All-Girl Release	Cosplay Queens and Tied Up Teens
2016	NightMoves Award	Won	Best MILF Performer (Editor's Choice)	—N/a
2016	XRCO Award	Won	Best Lesbian Performer	—N/a
2017	NightMoves Award	Won	Best MILF Performer (Editor's Choice)	—N/a
2017	NightMoves Award	Won	Triple Play Award	—N/a
2023	XRCO Award	Won	Hall of Fame	—N/a

== Personal life ==
Tate has stated that she is bi-curious. She is a cosplay enthusiast and uses an alter ego by the name of Lady Titan.

== See also ==
- List of British pornographic film actors

== Notes ==
- 2014 Interview with Tate on Crave
