= Community Organized Relief Effort =

Organization

Community Organized Relief Effort (CORE Response)
- Abbreviation: CORE; J/P HRO (former)
- Founded: March 2010
- Founders: Sean Penn; Diana Jenkins; Ann Lee (CORE)
- Founded at: Los Angeles, California
- Type: Non-profit organization
- Purpose: COVID-19 testing/contact tracing, wrap-around services, displaced persons camp and relocations management, health, education, community development and livelihoods, engineering and construction, including rubble removal
- Professional title: J/P Haitian Relief Organization (2010–2019)
- Location(s): Port-au-Prince, Haiti; Puerto Rico, U.S. Antigua; Barbuda; North Carolina, U.S. Florida, U.S.
- Region served: Haiti, Bahamas, Caribbean, Puerto Rico, USA
- Website: coreresponse.org/
- Formerly called: Jenkins/Penn Haitian Relief Organization

Community Organized Relief Effort, also known as CORE Response and formerly as J/P Haitian Relief Organization, is a non-profit organization founded in 2010 by actor Sean Penn and philanthropist Diana Jenkins in response to the January 12, 2010 earthquake in Haiti. The organization was founded in 2010 and changed its name in 2019 to receive contracts and donations to work globally. In March 2020, CORE began administering free COVID-19 tests in the U.S. amid the COVID-19 pandemic.

== Origins ==
In the wake of the 2010 Haiti earthquake, actor Sean Penn devised a plan to recruit physicians and travel to Haiti to donate food, water, and pain medicine. At a mutual friend's home in Malibu, Penn met Bosnian philanthropist and humanitarian Diana Jenkins, who, after hearing Penn's proposal, Jenkins offered a $1 million pledge for his cause. The two partnered to create the Jenkins-Penn Haitian Relief Organization (J/P HRO). Soon after arriving, Penn and Jenkins' partnership dissolved due to a conflict in leadership.

In 2019, J/P HRO was rebranded to Community Organized Relief Effort (CORE) as it expanded its relief efforts to Puerto Rico, Antigua and Barbuda, North Carolina, and Florida. The organization added Ann Lee as an honorary co-founder.

== Operations as J/P HRO ==
The aid group officially undertook The Pétionville camp in March 2010. By 2011, with 15 team members and numerous medical volunteers, the organization had developed a women's health center, a cholera isolation unit and a 24-hour emergency room in addition to coordinating sanitation, lighting, water and security for the camp. J/P HRO later employed nearly 350 people, 95 percent of whom were Haitian, to provide health, education and community development, and housing and economic opportunities.

=== Publicity and fundraising ===
The Travel Channel's food show No Reservations, hosted by Anthony Bourdain, featured Haiti as the 2011 season opener which first aired on February 28, 2011. Penn and J/P HRO were featured prominently in the show including a tour of one of the IDP camps.

On January 10, 2015, Penn held his fourth annual Sean Penn & Friends Help Haiti Home fundraiser in Beverly Hills, California, which raised over $6 million for the organization. The event featured many celebrities including former United States president Bill Clinton and performances by Coldplay's Chris Martin and Red Hot Chili Peppers, who closed the event with a 30-minute set.

== Operations as CORE ==
=== COVID-19 ===
After rebranding to CORE in 2019, CORE had employed nearly 1,000 people by June 2020, working on COVID-19 response at 45 testing sites, including 10 mobile sites, across the United States. CORE treated 500,000 patients at two community clinics following the earthquake, providing free emergency and primary medical care for a nominal sum. The clinics also led broad public education campaigns on good health and hygiene practice.

In response to the testing shortage in the United States during the COVID-19 pandemic, CORE set up and operated testing sites across the country, working in collaboration with local and state governments to open new sites as well as take over existing sites. As of August 2020, CORE had administered more than 1.3 million free COVID-19 tests. The organization has implemented guidelines called "The Core 8" to combat the virus, which includes "delivering test results within 48 hours, a government-supported contact tracing system, food and hygiene kits along with financial aid for households with positive case results." Site locations included Los Angeles, Oakland, Detroit, Chicago, Atlanta, New Orleans, New York, North Carolina, Navajo Nation, Napa, Bakersfield, and a "super-site" at Dodger Stadium, where up to 6,000 people were tested daily. Tests were administered using a nasopharyngeal or oral swab via drive-through or walk-up testing. By July 2020, CORE had worked to develop a contact tracing program as well.

In 2023, CORE held a fundraiser for its work fighting COVID in Brazil after the organization had closed operations in the country. Funds raised from its efforts were held by the organization, used to pay staff salaries, and not directed to the region for six months.

==== Publicity and fundraising ====
The proceeds from downloading and streaming of "Saved My Life", a song by Sia, co-written by Dua Lipa and performed during the online COVID Is No Joke live comedy fest hosted by Americares during the COVID-19 pandemic, benefits AmeriCares and CORE.

=== Hurricane relief and other activities ===
In the years following Hurricane Matthew, CORE has participated in hurricane relief efforts in the Bahamas, Puerto Rico, the Caribbean, and the United States.

In response to Hurricane Fiona in 2022, CORE raised over $200,000 in donations. When relief supplies arrived on the island, its sole employee had already departed for another assignment and materials were left sitting unclaimed in storage. However within days CORE was distributing tarps, generators, and supplies for diabetics.In the longer-run, CORE assisted with roofing repairs and provided staff to help residents fill out applications for Federal Emergency Management Agency funds.

Following reports of migrant abuse in Del Rio, Texas, CORE sent staff and COVID relief supplies. CORE lacked the necessary approvals and registration to provide medical care, and pivoted to distributing hygiene kits, warm meals, and baby formula.

==== Accounting ====
CORE has frequent turnover of its financial management staff, who have reported that the organization lacks the necessary accounting processes to handle the funds it receives. A 2020 independent audit identified seven areas of concern. At least one previous staff was received a salary after leaving the organization, even after reporting that he was still receiving payment.

In 2023, CORE announced that all issues identified in the 2020 audit had been resolved and published a clean independent 2022 audit in their annual impact report.

== Labor violations and complaints (CORE) ==
CORE staff complained that they were forced to work 18-hour days, six days a week, without the opportunity to take breaks. Responding to the staff concerns, Penn excoriated the employees, writing in an email that "in every cell of my body is a vitriol for the way your actions reflect so harmfully upon your brothers and sisters in arms". Penn suggested that employees leave their work instead of complaining about conditions. In October 2021, the National Labor Relations Board issued a complaint that Penn and CORE violated federal labor law. According to the charge, Penn "impliedly threatened" his employees with reprisals. A 2021 California lawsuit sought civil damages, claiming that CORE failed o pay overtime and minimum wges, provide rest periods, reimburse for business expenses, provide detailed wage statements, and timely pay employees. CORE repeatedly delayed court deadlines in the matter. In April 2023 Administrative Law Judge Lisa D. Ross, who presided over the matter, dismissed the NLRB case stating that Penn's message to CORE disaster response staff was a rallying cry in the wake of the organizations's efforts during their work battling COVID, not a threat.

Multiple reports of sexual misconduct by Los Angeles Fire Department personnel at CORE response sites were raised. The sole mechanism for reporting complaints was a Google Docs spreadsheets and an email address. One victim alleged that leadership said they were friends with one of the perpetrators and did not take action. Sites were run in conjunction with LAFD, whose administration was separate from CORE's. A lawsuit filed by one of the victims against Lee and another staffer was ordered to arbitration.

In 2022, a former CORE worker who provided support during COVID relief efforts in Georgia sued CORE for unpaid wages. According to the complaint, CORE deliberately misclassified staff as contractors to avoid paying overtime. CORE's contracts require binding arbitration, which prevents a collective action by multiple employees and keeps the proceedings private.
