= April O'Neil (actress) =

American pornographic film actress (born 1987)

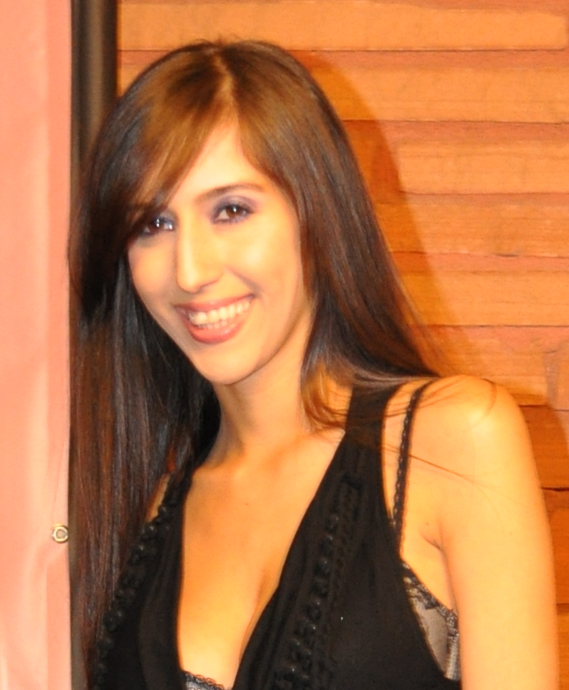
- O'Neil in 2011
- Born: April 7, 1987 (age 39); Phoenix, Arizona, U.S.
- Occupation: Pornographic film actress
- Years active: 2008–present
- Website: www.heyitsapril.com

April O'Neil (born April 7, 1987) is an American pornographic film actress.

== Early life and career ==
Originally from Phoenix, Arizona, O'Neil started her pornographic film career in 2008 after moving to Los Angeles and meeting another actress at a party. She adopted her stage name in homage to April O'Neil, one of the primary characters in Teenage Mutant Ninja Turtles. In 2013, she was one of the sixteen actresses profiled in Deborah Anderson's documentary film Aroused. She is bisexual.

LA Weekly ranked her tenth on their list of "10 Innovative Porn Stars Who Could Be the Next Sasha Grey" in 2013. Her moniker helped brand her as a "hipster porn star", according to LA Weekly. She has directed and performed in pornographic parodies of pop culture and gaming such as Riverdale, The Lego Movie, and Fortnite. She has regularly competed in a pinball league at a Los Angeles arcade.

O’Neil initially used her Tumblr account in 2008 to mostly post Doctor Who memes and later transitioned into posting her nude work. She believed her notoriety stemmed from these posts. When Tumblr began censoring adult content in 2018, she had an established performing career and moved onto other platforms along with several other sex workers and pornographic film actors and actresses, who also left the platform due to Tumblr's decision.

== Awards and nominations ==
| Year | Ceremony | Result | Award | Work |
|---|---|---|---|---|
| 2011 | XBIZ | Nominated | New Starlet of the Year | —N/a |
| 2012 | AVN | Nominated | Best Boy/Girl Sex Scene (with James Deen) | Legs Up Hose Down |
| 2012 | AVN | Nominated | Best Tease Performance | Legs Up Hose Down |
| 2013 | AVN | Nominated | Best All-Girl Group Sex Scene (with Ash Hollywood and Amber Rayne) | Buffy the Vampire Slayer XXX |
| 2013 | AVN | Won | Twitter Queen (Fan Award) | —N/a |
| 2013 | XBIZ | Nominated | Best Supporting Actress | The Godfather XXX |
| 2013 | XBIZ | Nominated | Best Scene – Parody Release (with Tommy Pistol) | The Godfather XXX |
| 2013 | XBIZ | Nominated | Best Scene – All-Girl (with Ash Hollywood and Amber Rayne) | Buffy the Vampire Slayer XXX |
| 2014 | AVN | Nominated | Best Three-Way Sex Scene (G/G/B) (with Dani Daniels and Erik Everhard) | Chance Encounters |
| 2014 | XBIZ | Nominated | Best Scene – Couples-Themed Release (with Dani Daniels and Erik Everhard) | Chance Encounters |
| 2014 | XBIZ | Won | Girl/Girl Performer of the Year | —N/a |
