= Tindra Frost =

Icelandic model and pornographic film actress (born 1991)

- Born: 13 April 1991 (age 35); Reykjavík, Iceland
- Occupations: Model; pornographic film actress
- Years active: 2012–present

Tindra Gunnarsdóttir (born 13 April 1991), known professionally as Tindra Frost, is an Icelandic model and pornographic film actress who is considered to be the first pornstar from Iceland.

== Life and career ==
Born and raised in Reykjavík, Frost also lived in northern Scotland and London. In 2012, when Frost was 21, she appeared on the British channel Babestation. Frost did not openly disclose being from Iceland, as she was concerned about her parents' judgement as well as Iceland's outlawing of pornography. She won a SHAFTA Award in 2018, being nominated for various other awards throughout her career. While living in the UK, Frost participated multiple bike-riding events, including the 'Ride for Pride and Inclusivity', with several adult films actors raising funds for HIV awareness and sexual health charities.

Frost has been critical of pornography laws in Iceland, stating that even if laws are not stringently enforced, that she is concerned about her name being public and rarely visiting the country. As of 2021, Frost lived in Canada.
