= Room 23 =

2009 photo book by Diana Jenkins

- Author: Diana Jenkins
- Illustrator: Deborah Anderson (photographer)
- Subject: Celebrity photography; Glamour photography
- Genre: Photography
- Publisher: Daab Pub
- Publication date: August 15, 2009
- Media type: Print (hardcover)
- Pages: 384
- ISBN: 978-3-866-54125-2

Room 23 is a 2009 coffee table fine-art photo book by Bosnian philanthropist Diana Jenkins and English photographer and film director Deborah Anderson. The book features 100 celebrities in a Beverly Hills penthouse.

== Background and content ==
Between late 2007 and early 2008, Bosnian activist and philanthropist Diana Jenkins enlisted the photographic collaboration of English photographer Deborah Anderson to create her erotic coffee table book that would raise funds for Jenkins' non-profit human rights project at UCLA's School of Law.

Produced by Jenkins, Anderson would develop the book's art direction and concept of "a year in the life of a hotel room," telling The Daily Telegraph, "We wanted to portray anything and everything, from Minnie Driver reading a script, topless, in bed, to Jonny Lee Miller in the bath with [Michele Hicks], and Lindsay Lohan in her bra and underwear."

For the book's photoshoot, Jenkins and Anderson recruited 100 actors, singers, models, and musicians to a single suite at the Peninsula Hotel in Beverly Hills, California in 2008; amongst the participating celebrities were Jenkins, George Clooney, Elton John, Lindsay Lohan, Cindy Crawford, and Sharon Stone.

== Notable participants ==
Other notable participants of the book include:

- Dennis Hopper
- Kid Rock
- James Blunt
- Cheryl Tiegs
- Alice Evans
- Ioan Gruffudd
- Eric McCormack
- Heidi Klum
- May Andersen
- Tatjana Patitz
- Jade Anderson
- Brett Ratner
- Hayden Panettiere
- Milo Anthony Ventimiglia
- Kevin Zegers
- Rachel Roberts
- Kelly Lynch
- Dania Ramirez
- Marisa Miller
- Vidal Sassoon
- Zuleikha Robinson
- Michele Hicks
- Natasha Henstridge
- Mike and Irena Medavoy
- David Furnish
- Sofia Boutella
- Larry King
- Wladimir Klitschko
- Stacey Dash
- Eric Benét
- Judith Owen
- Harry Shearer
- Eva Herzigová
- Caroline Scheufele
- Ludacris
- Mark Mahoney
- Melissa Odabash
- Ashanti
- Amanda Bynes
- Tony Ward
- Ray Liotta
- Jessica White
- Jerry Weintraub
- Gina Gershon
- Hany Abu-Assad
- Tara Summers
- David Spade
- Jessica Stam
- Kenny G
- Rossif Sutherland
- Robin Antin
- Rachel Hunter
- Josie Maran
- Downtown Julie Brown
- Jon Anderson

== Release ==
Room 23 was unveiled at the Peninsula Hotel on February 17, 2009. Though initially planned to launch in March 2009, the book debuted in August in 120 countries and was released in American retailers on September 8.
