= Feel the Sunshine =

Single by Alex Reece

from the album So Far
- B-side: "Jazz Master"
- Released: 4 December 1995
- Studio: Acid Lab
- Genre: Drum and bass; jungle; breakbeat
- Length: 6:18 (vocal mix); 5:42 (original mix)
- Label: Blunted; Island
- Songwriters: Alex Reece; Deborah Anderson
- Producer: Alex Reece

Alex Reece singles chronology
| "Feel the Sunshine" (1995) | "Candles" (1996) |

"Feel the Sunshine" is a song by British drum and bass producer Alex Reece featuring vocals by British singer Deborah Anderson, who also co-wrote the lyrics. It received critical acclaim and was included on Reece's debut album, So Far, which was released in September 1996. The song was released in December 1995 as a single by Blunted and Island Records, peaking at number 69 on the UK Singles Chart. A re-release in May 1996 containing remixes charted higher, peaking at number 26. On the UK Dance Singles Chart, "Feel the Sunshine" was more successful, peaking at number two (1995) and four (1996). It is now widely regarded as one of the most classic drum and bass songs.

== Background and release ==
Reece began DJing in the late 1980s. In 1992, Jack Smooth offered Reece a trainee studio engineer job, and Reece went on to engineer for Smooth on many of the early Basement Records releases. Reece first tried house (recording with his brother, Oscar, under the name of Exodus), but graduated to drum and bass. Though his preferred genres were acid house and Detroit techno, Reece would become known for jungle and drum 'n' bass in the mid-1990s.

"Feel the Sunshine" was released on December 4, 1995, by Blunted and Island Records. It was made available as a 10", 12" and CD single, and became successful in clubs. The track was A-listed by BBC Radio One and, at one stage, was getting 26 plays a week. In 1996, it was re-released and this time even more successful. Featured vocalist on the track, Deborah Anderson's vocals were recorded at London's Eden studio on to Dat from which Reece then sampled the vocals.

== Critical reception ==
Larry Flick from Billboard magazine wrote, "With the drum'n'bass/electronic revolution raging to mainstream heights, the time is right for Reece to break out of the underground. This is one of numerous highlights on the U.K. producer/composer's sterling stateside debut." He added that here, "ambient keyboards and staccato beats are warmed by the presence of guest vocalist Deborah Anderson, who has a quality not unlike Björk, but smoother and far more mainstream-friendly." Tim Haslett from CMJ complimented the song as "blissful". Jim Carroll from Irish Times praised it as "a bewilderingly simple melody" and "timeless and classic", noting "the euphoric shudder" of "Feel the Sunshine". Martin James from Melody Maker named it "one of the finest pop singles of the year. Its simple structure, aching hookline and haunting melody lifting it high above the stuck-in-the-festival-mud criticism stating that "the singer" sounds just like Björk." A reviewer from Music Week gave it three out of five, saying, "There have been some varying takes on jungle recently and Reece's understated, melodic drum and bass excursions with a jazz tinge will find him a wider audience in the near future."

Calvin Bush from Muzik commented, "YES, he really is worth all the purple prose and exaggerated metaphors! After what seems like eons, Reece finally delivers his major label debut and the phrases "bloody essential" and "stick this in your jazz pipe and smoke it, son" spring to mind." Mark Beaumont from NME wrote, "Slinky, minimalist Martian-jungle from dancefloor innovator and producer Reece. The sound of a space-shuttle traffic jam with Björk-a-like vocalist Deborah Anderson trying to keep everyone calm by convincing us that there's No pressure/No insecurities until a frenetic techno-rumble kicks in to prove otherwise. Spooky, schizophrenic and swoonsome." Another NME editor, John Perry, noted the "divine summer breeze" of the song, stating that the producer "breakbeats his insistently over low-rent electro squiggles and honey-dripping vocals drape like velvet over a chaise longue. Reece has rubbed all the dirt from the surface of harcore and polished it until it reflects the sun." Brad Beatnik from the Record Mirror Dance Update gave it four out of five and named it "a rich, atmospheric tune." He added, "The remix makes the most of the strings and organ feel, the original uses less of the Björk-like vocal over more minimal drum and bass beats." Upon the 1996 re-release, Sarah Davis wrote, "It was an astute choice as a single, encapsulating Reece's warm sound, and its hints of house and use of vocals made it radio-friendly."

== Music video ==
A music video was produced to promote the single. It takes place at an underground party. Singer Deborah Anderson sings as she makes her way through dark passages in the underground. She wears dark make up on her eyelids and has feathers in her hair. A DJ spins records and people dances around her. Towards the end, Anderson reaches the surface and comes out into the daylight.

== Track listing ==
- 12" single (1995)
1. "Feel the Sunshine" (Vocal Mix)
2. "Feel the Sunshine" (Original Mix)
3. "Jazz Master" (Alex's Funky Mix)
- CD single (1995)
1. "Feel the Sunshine" (Vocal Mix) — 6:18
2. "Feel the Sunshine" (Original Mix) — 5:42
3. "Jazz Master" (Original Mix) — 5:36
4. "Jazz Master" (Alex's Funky Mix) — 4:49
- 12" single (Remixes) (1996)
1. "Feel the Sunshine" (DJ Pulse Remix) — 5:44
2. "Jazz Master" (DJ Krust Remix) — 6:50
3. "Jazz Master" (Kruder & Dorfmeister Remix) — 8:23
- CD single (Remixes) (1996)
1. "Feel the Sunshine" (Original Radio Edit) — 3:53
2. "Feel the Sunshine" (DJ Pulse Remix) — 5:46
3. "Jazz Master" (DJ Krust Remix) — 6:51
4. "Jazz Master" (Kruder and Dorfmeister Remix) — 8:24

== Charts ==
| Chart (1995) | Peak position |
|---|---|
| UK Singles (OCC) | 69 |
| UK Dance (OCC) | 2 |
| UK Club Chart (Music Week) | 54 |

| Chart (1996) | Peak position |
|---|---|
| Europe (Eurochart Hot 100) | 100 |
| Scotland (OCC) | 37 |
| UK Singles (OCC) | 26 |
| UK Dance (OCC) | 4 |
| UK Airplay (Music Week) | 37 |
