= Alex Reece =

British musician (born 1970)

- Also known as: Reece; Original Playboy; Fallen Angels
- Born: Alexander Charles Ernest Reece; 28 November 1970 (age 55)
- Origin: Ealing, England
- Genres: Jungle Music, Drum and Bass
- Years active: 1992–present
- Formerly of: Electronix Experienced; Bounty Killaz; Fallen Angels; Interception; Jazz Juice; Reece Project; Unit 1

Alex Reece (born Alexander Reece, from England, West London Borough Ealing is a drum and bass musician. He popularized the use of two-step breaks in drum and bass, and was an influence of the jazzstep sound, a mix of drum and bass and jazz. Reece was one of the musicians in the Metalheadz collective, and has also worked under the pseudonym of Fallen Angels.

== Career ==
Reece began DJing in the late 1980s. In 1992, Jack Smooth offered Reece a trainee studio engineer job, and Reece went on to engineer for Smooth on many of the early Basement Records releases. Reece first tried techno (recording with his brother, Oscar, under the name of XE-DUS), but graduated to drum and bass. Though his preferred genres were acid house and Detroit techno, Reece become known for jungle music in the mid-1990s.

His initial releases appeared on Liquid Wax with DJ Phantasy under The Reece Project, Basement Records and Creative Wax labels. However, Reece made his name with Goldie's MetalHeadz Records with the single releases "Basic Principles" (1994) and "Pulp Fiction" (1995). Pulp Fiction was released in 1995 as a single on MetalHeadz, his surname was incorrectly listed as "Reese" on the first batch. Fabio was thinking of releasing on his new label Creative Source, but delays with that lend to it going to MetalHeadz label.

"Pulp Fiction" was also later released on an album by Goldie, again on his MetalHeadz label, preventing Reece from putting it out on his own album So Far on the label, 4th & Broadway. Instead Reece produced a remake of "Pulp Fiction" called "Pulp Friction", released in 1996. The two-step break and Reese Bassline used in "Pulp Fiction" became Drum and Bass Standards.

Reece cemented his reputation with additional recordings as Jazz Juice, from 1995, with Paul Saunders (for Precious Materials), Lunar Funk (for Mo'Wax), and the Original Playboy (for R&S). In early 1995, Reece secured a recording contract when Island Records recruited him for their Quango subsidiary. His debut album, So Far was released in September 1996 with 2 singles being previously released from his So Far album Feel the Sunshine" in December 1995 making introductory Drum and Bass chart success and "Candles" released in 1996 all produced at his studio "Acid Lab" these were released under the Fourth & Broadway banner with real commercial success. He is now back working on new drum and bass music with his brother Stewart Reece under the Metalheadz label.

== Discography ==
=== Albums ===
- "So Far" (4th & B'way Records, 1996)

=== Selected singles ===
- as Fallen Angels (with Wax Doctor) "Oh Yeah/Hello Lover" (IQ Records, 1994)
- "Fresh Jive/Basic Principles/I Need Your Love" (Metalheadz, 1994)
- "Pulp Fiction" (Metalheadz, 1995)
- "Feel The Sunshine" (Island Records, 1995)
- "Candles" (4th & B'way Records, 1996)
- "Acid Lab" (4th & B'way Records, 1996)
