= Yummy mummy =

Slang term for a young, attractive mother

Yummy mummy is a slang term used to describe an attractive mother. The earliest use of the term in print is in Lisa Alther's 1976 novel Kinflicks where it is applied by school football players to attractive older women The term was popularised in the late 20th century, and was often applied to celebrity mothers such as Elizabeth Hurley or Victoria Beckham, who appeared to quickly regain their pre-pregnancy figures after giving birth, and continued to lead carefree and affluent lifestyles. Episode 13 of series six of The Nanny (airing in 1999) was called "The Yummy Mummy". A stereotypical yummy mummy was described by Nirpal Dhaliwal in The Times as having an existence "bankrolled by a husband working himself to death in the City, [dressing] in designer outfits... carries the latest must-have bag [and] whose hair and nails are perfectly groomed".

Yummy mummy has a similar slang connotation to MILF, but suggesting a younger subject.

It was reported in 2008 that celebrity yummy mummies were contributing to levels of depression in young mothers, making new mothers feel "saggy, baggy and depressed" about their own bodies.

== See also ==
- MILF
- Trophy wife
- Cougar (slang)
