= The Naked Feminist =

2004 documentary film

- Release date: 2004
- Country: United States

The Naked Feminist is a 2004 American documentary film about sex-positive feminist women working in the American pornography industry. It is the debut work of Australian film maker Louisa Achille and features interviews with Marilyn Chambers, Christi Lake, Ginger Lynn Allen, Chloe Nicole, Sharon Mitchell, Nina Hartley, Veronica Hart, Kylie Ireland, Annie Sprinkle and Candida Royalle. Some of these women were members of Club 90, an early support group of female porn performers, and all of them found their work in porn empowering.

The 58-minute-long film won an audience award at the South by Southwest Festival in 2004.
