= Deborah Anderson =

English musician and photographer (born 1970)

- Education: Roedean School
- Occupations: Musician; photographer; film director
- Years active: 1980–present
- Notable work: Aroused
- Parent: Jon Anderson
- Family: Jade Anderson (sister)
- Website: Official website

Deborah Leigh Anderson (born 16 December 1970) is an English musician, photographer, and film director. Her early music work was as a vocalist on her father Jon Anderson's albums. Her 1995 single "Feel the Sunshine" was her first song that charted, hitting the UK Dance and European Hot 100. She has also contributed vocals to a number of collaborative works with other recording artists. Her 2009 debut album Silence accompanied her photography book Paperthin, a work featuring photos of actors and musicians.

Her photography work was featured on albums by singer Pink, and in Cosmopolitan, Vogue and other magazines. Her second photo book, Room 23, featured her pictures of celebrities in a collaboration with Diana Jenkins. In 2013, Anderson made her directorial debut with Aroused, a documentary film following the lives of 16 adult film actresses. Aroused was generally well received by critics, who note the film for the vulnerability of its subjects and compared Anderson's stylistic presentation to Annie Leibovitz and Michael Moore.

== Early life and family ==
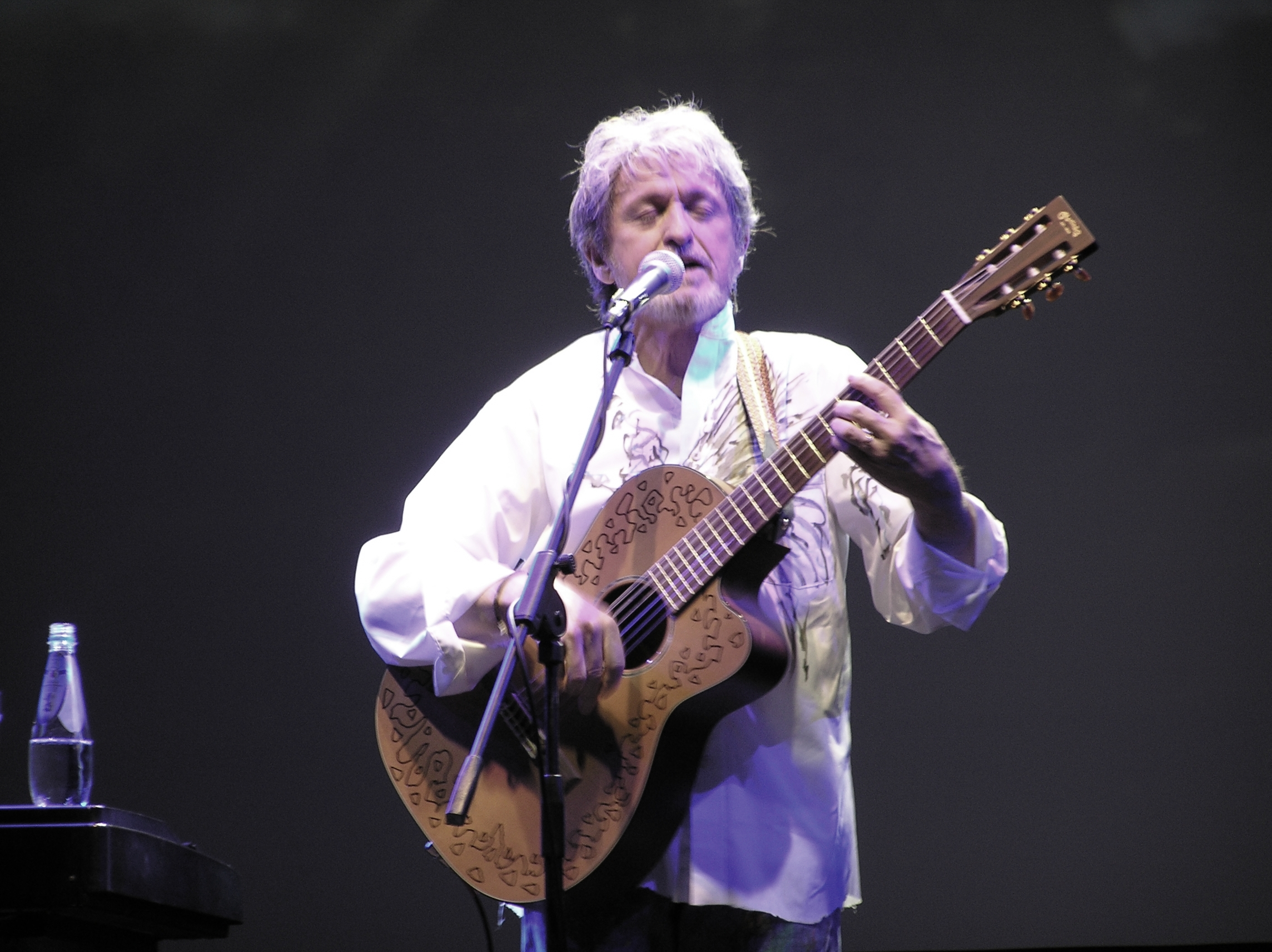
Deborah Anderson's early music included collaborations with her father Jon Anderson

Deborah Anderson is the daughter of singer Jon Anderson and Jennifer Anderson (née Baker), and sister to singer Jade Anderson. On the 1983 Jon & Vangelis album, Private Collection, Jon wrote the lyrics and a song named after her titled "Deborah". Deborah's earliest musical work was on projects with her father: including backing vocals on "Song of Seven" in 1980, and on Anderson Bruford Wakeman Howe (album) (1989), the 1993 Latin American Jon Anderson solo tour, Deseo (1994), Angels Embrace (1995) and Toltec (1996). She was educated at Roedean School in Brighton. She also worked in vintage fashion, owning her own store.

== Music ==
1995 saw the release of "Feel the Sunshine" (Island Records) by Alex Reece featuring Deborah Anderson (included on Reece's 1996 album So Far). The drum & bass single made #2 in the UK Dance Singles Chart in 1995, and #4 on the same chart the following year. It made the Eurochart Hot 100 in 1996. This led to Anderson signing to Mo' Wax and her debut solo single, "Lonely Without You", was released in 1997.

She has worked as a vocalist on a number of projects, including work with DJ Krush ("Skin Against Skin" on 1997's Milight, released on Mo' Wax; later used on the TV series La Femme Nikita), Fallen Angels ("Blue Sky" on 1999's Part One), DJ Shadow, Zero 7, Le Tonne and Tipper (2000s "Dissolve (Out)" single, released on Fuel Records). She appeared and co-wrote three songs on Télépopmusik's album Angel Milk (EMI Music, 2005), including the single "Into Everything".

Her debut solo album, Silence, was released in 2009. The album accompanied Paperthin, a coffee table book of her photography.

== Photography and filmmaking ==
She served as art director for The Gansevoort Hotel group. Anderson contributed photography for Pink's albums: I'm Not Dead, Funhouse and The Truth About Love, and a marketing campaign for Bebe Stores. Anderson has had her images published in magazines including Elle, GQ, Cosmopolitan, Architectural Digest, Hello, Harper's Bazaar, FHM, Playboy, Vogue and Vanity Fair. Based on her first photographic exhibition, "Hollywood Erotique" (Los Angeles, 2004), Paperthin, published in 2008, is a book of her black-and-white photography based on 1930s erotica. Models include Minnie Driver, Fergie, Pink, Natasha Henstridge, Sophie Dahl and Tilda Swinton. The book accompanied her debut solo album Silence. Anderson's second book of photography entitled Room 23, published in February 2009, featured Sharon Stone, George Clooney, Elton John, Minnie Driver, Dennis Hopper, Cindy Crawford, Heidi Klum, Norman Reedus, Gina Gershon, Sting, Lindsay Lohan, Larry King and others as models. The book was organised in conjunction with Sanela Diana Jenkins to support the UCLA Sanela Diana Jenkins International Justice Clinic. Anderson was described by the Los Angeles Times as "a photographer whose distinctive sensuality is located somewhere between classic French erotica and Helmut Newton".

Anderson's first feature documentary film Aroused featured interviews with 16 female pornographic performers, and was released in cinemas in the U.S. in the summer of 2013 and internationally in January 2014. Sixteen actresses were involved: Jesse Jane, Belladonna, Katsuni, Allie Haze, Kayden Kross, April O'Neil, Francesca Lé, Lisa Ann, Brooklyn Lee, Alexis Texas, Asphyxia Noir, Teagan Presley, Ash Hollywood, Tanya Tate, Lexi Belle and Misty Stone. Aroused accompanied a photography book of the same name. The New York Times compared the film's cinematic style to an advertisement for Victoria's Secret, and wrote it would have been better as a television series similar to a combination of Taxicab Confessions and Red Shoe Diaries. Anderson was inspired to work on Aroused, after previously photographing an adult industry actress for a magazine shoot. She wanted to draw attention to a double standard in society regarding consumption of pornography while simultaneously stigmatizing the actresses that perform in the adult industry. She stated her attempt was to humanize and provide dignity to the actresses. Anderson cast the actresses in the film in order to showcase, "the most successful women in the adult film industry". Aroused was compared by the Chicago Tribune to the documentary After Porn Ends with a more optimistic feel to it. Screen Daily and BroadwayWorld commented favorably on the vulnerability of the subjects. Film critics compared the documentary's style to Michael Moore, Annie Leibovitz and the film Naked Ambition: An R Rated Look at an X Rated Industry. A review of the film in the Los Angeles Times was critical, writing that it was only recommended for fans of Alexis Texas, Katsuni and Misty Stone. The Village Voice found the subject more appropriate for a photography book. The Hollywood Reporter and The Washington Post criticized Aroused for its lack of depth. The New York Daily News criticized Anderson for self-promotion. In 2015, Anderson was one of the first clients for a new photographers' agency launched by Rihanna called The Dog Ate My Homework.

Her documentary film "Women of the White Buffalo" was released in 2022.

== Filmography ==
Year	Title				
Year	Title	Director	Writer	Producer	Notes
1995	Embrace of the Vampire	No	No	No	Musician, Performer, "You Make Me Want You".
2013	Aroused	Yes	No	Yes	Also released photography book, Aroused.
2014	Deborah Falconer: Lift Your Gaze	Yes	No	No	Director, music video.
2016	Walking Prayers	Yes	No	Yes	Also served as film editor.
2018	My Revolution Lives in This Body	Yes	No	No	Written by Eve Ensler.
2019	Jon Anderson: Makes Me Happy	Yes	No	Yes	Music video. Also served as film editor.
2020	Women of the White Buffalo	Yes	Yes	Yes	Feature-length documentary. Also served as film editor.
2020	Raise the Vibration	Yes	No	No	Short film. Also served as film editor.

== Discography ==
- Anderson, Deborah (2009), Silence (studio album; compact disc; 10 audio tracks), Somis Sound, OCLC 823750123

== Publications ==
- Anderson, Deborah (2008), Paperthin, Verlhac Editions, ISBN 978-2-916954-07-3, OCLC 664474391
- Anderson, Deborah; Jenkins, Diana (2009), Room 23, Daab Media, ISBN 978-3866541252
- Anderson, Deborah (2012), Aroused: The Lost Sensuality of a Woman, Cherry On Top, Incorporated, ISBN 978-0989374408

== Awards and nominations ==
Year	Award	Category	Work	Result	Notes
2019	Red Nation Film Award of Excellence	Best Documentary	Women of the White Buffalo	Won	
2019	Los Angeles Independent Film Festival Award	Best Director Documentary Feature	Women of the White Buffalo	Won	
2020	Idyllwild International Festival of Cinema Award (IIFC Award)	Best Director Documentary	Women of the White Buffalo	Won	
2020	Idyllwild International Festival of Cinema Award (IIFC Award)	Best Feature Documentary	Women of the White Buffalo	Won	
2020	Idyllwild International Festival of Cinema Award (IIFC Award)	Golden Era Humanitarian Award	Women of the White Buffalo	Won	
2020	Idyllwild International Festival of Cinema Award (IIFC Award)	Summerhawk Native American Award	Women of the White Buffalo	Won	

== See also ==
- List of female film and television directors
- List of film and television directors
- List of British women photographers
- List of women writers
