= MILF =

Mother considered sexually attractive

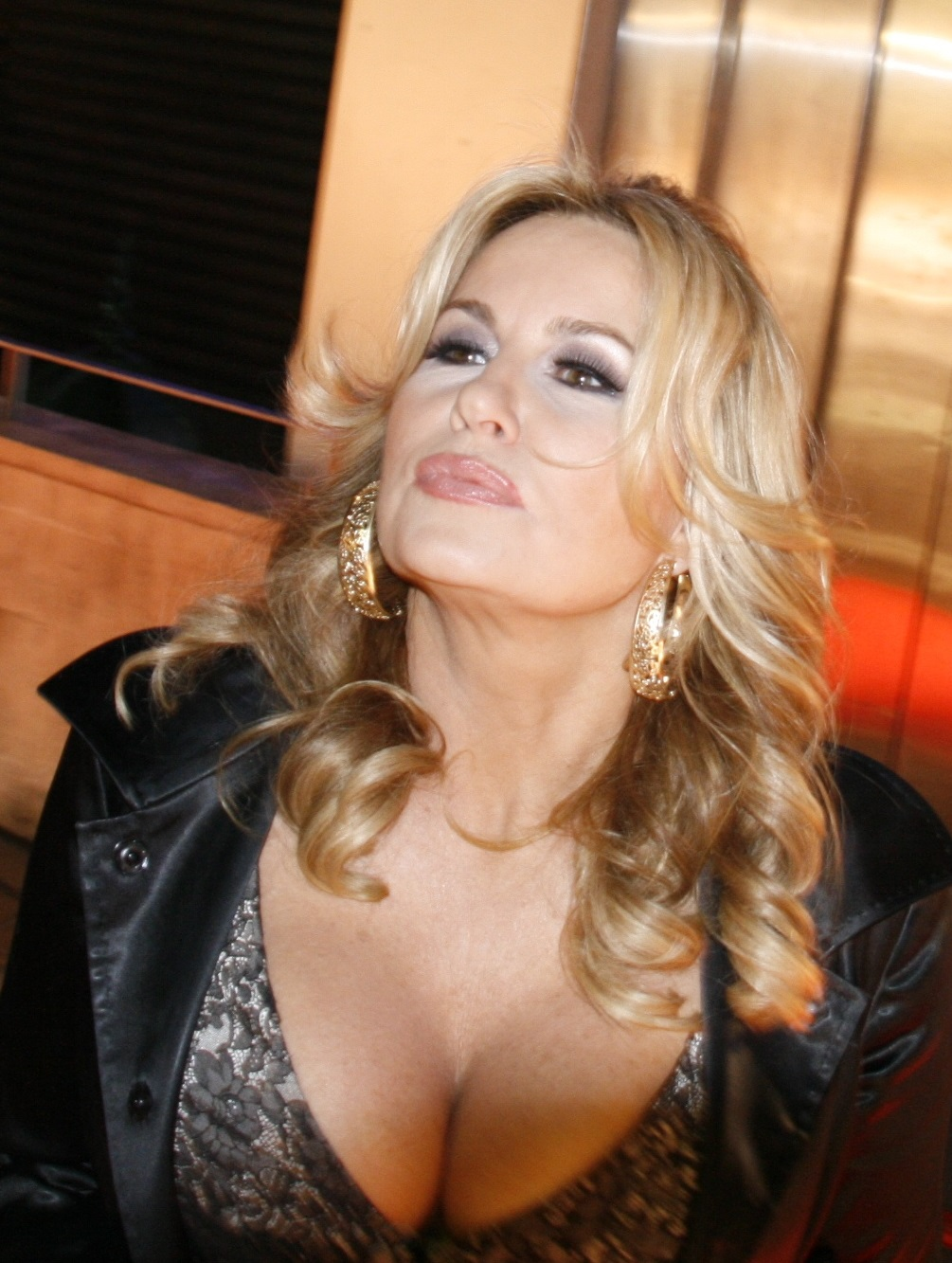
Jennifer Coolidge, whose character in American Pie helped popularize the term "MILF"

MILF (/mɪlf/, as if read as "milf") is an acronym that stands for "mother I'd like to fuck". This abbreviation is usually used in colloquial English instead of the whole phrase. It connotes an older woman, typically one with children, considered sexually attractive. A related term is "cougar", which suggests an older woman in active pursuit of a sexual relationship with younger men.

== History ==
Linguist Laurel A. Sutton states that MILF was one of nine terms for "attractive women" collected from undergraduates at a large linguistics class at Berkeley in the spring of 1992. Typical users would be "college students from East Contra Costa, California". The term was widely popularized by the film American Pie (1999), where John Cho's character (simply credited as "MILF Guy No. 2") used the term to refer to Jennifer Coolidge's character Jeanine Stifler. American Pie screenwriter Adam Herz clarified that he did not invent the phrase.

A 2007 article in New York magazine stated the evidence that the term had become mainstream included "25,000-plus MILF-branded mugs and tees on Café Press to a rash of hot-mama books (The Hot Mom's Handbook, Confessions of a Naughty Mommy, The MILF Anthology), television shows (Desperate Housewives, The Real Housewives of Orange County, the forthcoming contest "Hottest Mom in America", and a pilot in development called MILF & Cookies), and a concomitant porn genre".

Some media outlets found the expression offensive to women, and suggested replacing it with WHIP, coined by Bibi Lynch, which stands for "women who are hot, intelligent and in their prime".

== Similar terms ==
The term yummy mummy is also used along with MILF. The Oxford English Dictionary defines the term as "an attractive and stylish young mother".

Although not yet as widespread in popular culture at large, the forms DILF (for "dad/daddy I'd like to fuck") or FILF (for "father I'd like to fuck") are used among androphiles to refer to a sexually attractive older man who is likely a father.

The terms GILF (for "granny I'd like to fuck") and silver fox refer to attractive, highly-sexual older women (55+), regardless of child-bearing status.

== In popular culture ==
In 2002, a resident of the U.S. state of Washington applied for a vanity license plate reading "GOTMILF", a parody of the "Got Milk?" advertising slogan. This plate was approved (the applicant claimed MILF meant "manual inline lift fluctuator"), but it was later cancelled after complaints were filed against it.

In December 2007, low-cost carrier Spirit Airlines ran a controversial advertising campaign, using MILFs to promote their tropical destinations, based on a different acronym: "Many Islands, Low Fares". In January 2009, Spirit ran the campaign again.

In 2013, an apparel company, True & Co., parodied the phrase in advertising for its line of brassieres, converting it to "Mom I'd Like to Fit". The campaign garnered negative attention.

SMILF is an American comedy television series starring, created, written and directed by Frankie Shaw on Showtime. It is based on Shaw's short film of the same title. The series' name, SMILF, is a play on the term "MILF", with the "S" standing for "single" or "Southie" (a nickname for South Boston, Massachusetts), or both.

In 2016, Fergie released the song "M.I.L.F. $" as well as an accompanying video featuring numerous famous mothers.

The 2018 French comedy film MILF is about three childhood friends who become MILFs, seducing three young men.

== See also ==
- MILF pornography
- Age disparity in sexual relationships
- Cougar (slang)
- Gerontophilia
- Oedipus complex
