= Richard Harold Steinberg =

American economist

Richard Harold Steinberg (born July 15, 1960), is the Jonathan D. Varat Endowed Chair in Law Professor of Law at the UCLA School of Law, Professor of Political Science, Director of the Sanela Diana Jenkins Human Rights Project, and editor-in-chief of the Human Rights and International Criminal Law Online Forum (a cooperative undertaking with the Prosecutor of the International Criminal Court). He is a member of the Council on Foreign Relations, and the editorial boards of the American Journal of International Law and International Organization. He was formerly Assistant General Counsel to the United States Trade Representative under Josh Bolten in the first Bush administration. His work for the Sanela Diana Jenkins Human Rights Project has included visits to Eastern Congo to remediate gender violence used as a weapon of war. He was a member of UCLA's disbanded Antisemitism Task Force.

He has written over forty articles on international law and politics, and edited, co-edited, or co-authored six books: Partners or Competitors? The Prospects for U.S.-EU Cooperation on Asian Trade (Rowman & Littlefield, 1999), The Greening of Trade Law: International Trade Organizations and Environmental Issues (Rowman & Littlefield, 2002), The Evolution of the Trade Regime: Economics, Law, and Politics of the GATT/WTO (Princeton University Press, 2006), International Law and International Relations (Cambridge University Press, 2007), International Institutions (SAGE 2010), and Assessing the Legacy of the ICTY (Martinus Nijhoff, 2011).

== Education ==
- B.A. Yale, 1982
- J.D. Stanford, 1986
- Ph.D. Stanford, 1992
