= The Best of Jon and Vangelis =

Greatest hits album by Jon and Vangelis
- Released: 27 July 1984
- Recorded: 1979–1983
- Genre: Electronic music
- Length: 50:43
- Label: Polydor
- Producer: Vangelis

Jon and Vangelis chronology
Private Collection (1983)	The Best of Jon and Vangelis (1984)	Page of Life (1991)

Singles from The Best of Jon and Vangelis
- 1. "State of Independence" Released: 20 July 1984

Professional ratings
Review scores
Source	Rating
Allmusic	4/5 stars

The Best of Jon and Vangelis is a compilation album by the Jon and Vangelis duo, the musical collaboration between Yes frontman Jon Anderson and Greek synthesizer musician, Vangelis. Released in 1984 by Polydor Records, the album features songs from their first three studio albums: Short Stories, The Friends of Mr Cairo and Private Collection.

It peaked at number 42 in UK and spent 9 weeks in the charts. It was the duo's last charting album in the UK and their lowest peaking album in this country.

== Track listing ==
Track	Title	Length	Album
1	Italian Song	2:54	Private Collection
2	I'll Find My Way Home	4:29	The Friends of Mr Cairo
3	State of Independence (Single Edit)	4:22	The Friends of Mr. Cairo
4	One More Time	6:15	Short Stories
5	A Play Within a Play	7:00	Short Stories
6	The Friends of Mr Cairo	11:50	The Friends of Mr Cairo
7	Outside of This (Inside of That)	5:03	The Friends of Mr Cairo
8	He Is Sailing (Single Edit)	4:11	Private Collection
9	I Hear You Now (Single Edit)	4:48	Short Stories

== Personnel ==
- Jon Anderson - Composer, Vocals
- Vangelis - Composer, Arranger, Keyboards, Synthesizers, Piano, Electronics
- Carol Kenyon - Backing vocals
- Dick Morrissey - Flute, Saxophone

Production

- Sleeve design - Vangelis and Alwyn Clayden
- Engineer - Raphael Preston and Raine Shine
- Creative assistance - Green Ink
- Producer - Vangelis

== Charts ==
Chart (1984)	Peak position
Dutch Albums (Album Top 100)	42
German Albums (Offizielle Top 100)	52
UK Albums (OCC)	42
