= Roland Jupiter-4 =

Polyphonic analog synthesizer

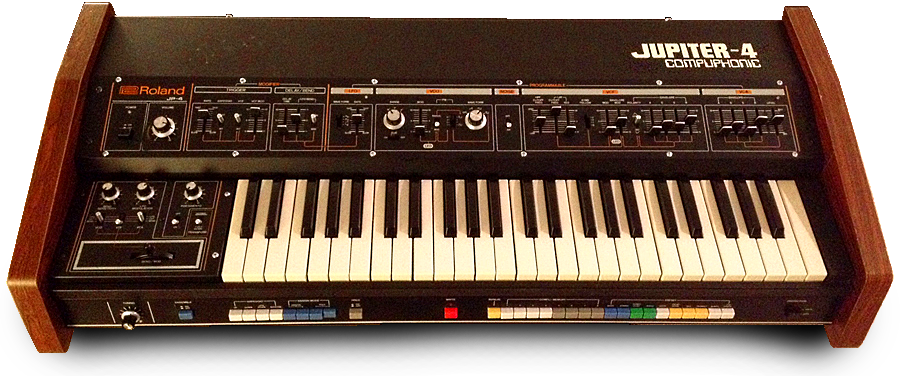
- Roland Jupiter-4 Compuphonic
- Manufacturer: Roland
- Dates: 1978 - 1981
- Price: US$2,895; GB£1,810; JP¥385,000

Technical specifications
- Polyphony: 4 voices
- Timbrality: Monotimbral
- Oscillator: 1 VCO + 1 sub-oscillator per voice
- LFO: 1 triangle/square/sawtooth/reverse sawtooth
- Synthesis type: Analog Subtractive
- Filter: 1 resonant lowpass, 1 highpass
- Attenuator: 2 ADSR
- Aftertouch expression: No
- Velocity expression: No
- Storage memory: 10 presets/8 user patches
- Effects: chorus

Input/output
- Keyboard: 49 keys
- External control: None

JP-4 PWM strings
[Chorus disabled] a demonstration of slow PWM on a 'string-like' envelope.

JP-4 bass arpeggio
[Chorus enabled] an example of the 'bass' preset with added release and portamento, set to the random arpeggio. This exact effect and preset is used in Gary Numan's song: "I Sing Rain".

JP-4 monophonic voice glide
[Chorus enabled] showcasing the Jupiter-4's ability to run all four voices in monophonic mode that glide slightly apart due to the nature of the independent voice cards.

JP-4 sample & hold
[Chorus enabled] an example of the Jupiter-4's sample & hold effect at varying speeds.

The Roland Jupiter-4 (JP-4) was an analog synthesizer manufactured by the Roland Corporation between 1978 and 1981. It was notable as the company's first self-contained polyphonic synthesizer, and for employing digital control of analog circuits (termed compuphonic by Roland), allowing for such features as programmable memory, voice assignment modes, an arpeggiator, polyphonic portamento and others.

Priced at US$2,895, it was dramatically cheaper than other polyphonic machines from its competitors such as the Yamaha CS-80, Korg PS-3300, Sequential Circuits Prophet-5, and Oberheim OB-X. While it didn't sell as many units compared to the competition, its primary design was such that it could be an accompaniment to organs, complete with an option for a music sheet stand to be fitted. Its future successor in 1981, the Jupiter-8, would go on to sell many more units and make Jupiter a recognized brand.

== Architecture ==
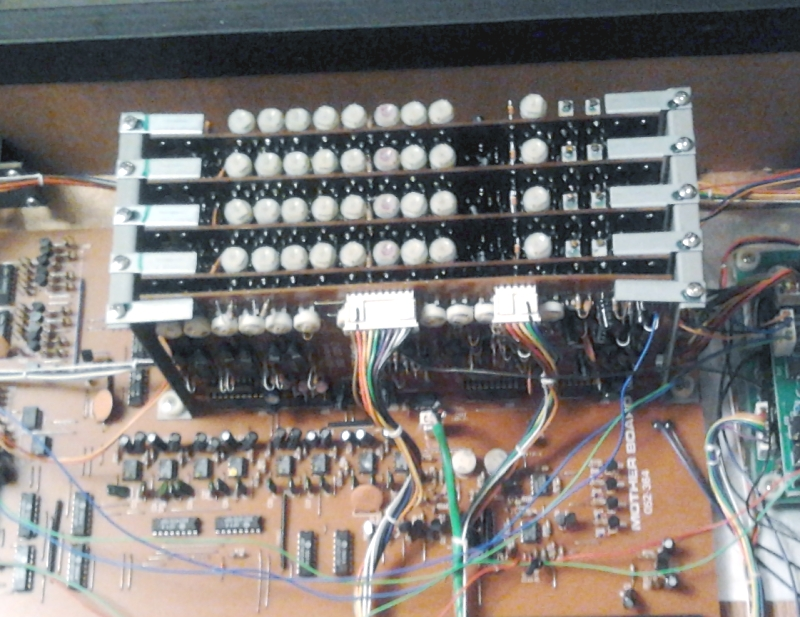
The four voice cards

The Jupiter-4's basic architecture consisted of four voice cards, each containing a: VCO, sub-oscillator, VCF (resonant low-pass which can self-oscillate), and a VCA. Modulation included an attack-decay-sustain-release (ADSR) envelope for the filter, and another for the voltage-control amplifier and a final level output with an overload LED. In typical Roland fashion, the filter ADSR could be inverted allowing for "upside down" modulation. The LFO was notable for being able to reach audio frequencies, allowing for crude FM and AM synthesis. The LFO is routable to a comprehensive amount of options, including: the bender, VCO pitch, pulse-width, both highpass and lowpass filter cutoff, and the VCA. The final VCA level setting could be memorized in user presets, and was prior to the overall master stereo output volume. Those settings were memorized in the user presets but a fully adjustable depth remained independently configurable through the pitch wheel to combinations of VCO, VCF and VCA, as well as a bend range. The master volume as well as the portamento are unmemorized as they're analog controls not linked to any of the digital control circuitry.

The VCOs can garner unstable tuning if aging or low-quality electrolytic capacitors are used (two for each voice card). Synthesizer repair shops can replace these tuning capacitors with stable polystyrene capacitors for an instant perfect tune. Individual oscillator card VCO tuning is accessed by four capped holes in the middle of the back of the case, but the unit should be allowed to warm up before adjusting for at least 20 to 40 minutes prior to adjustment.

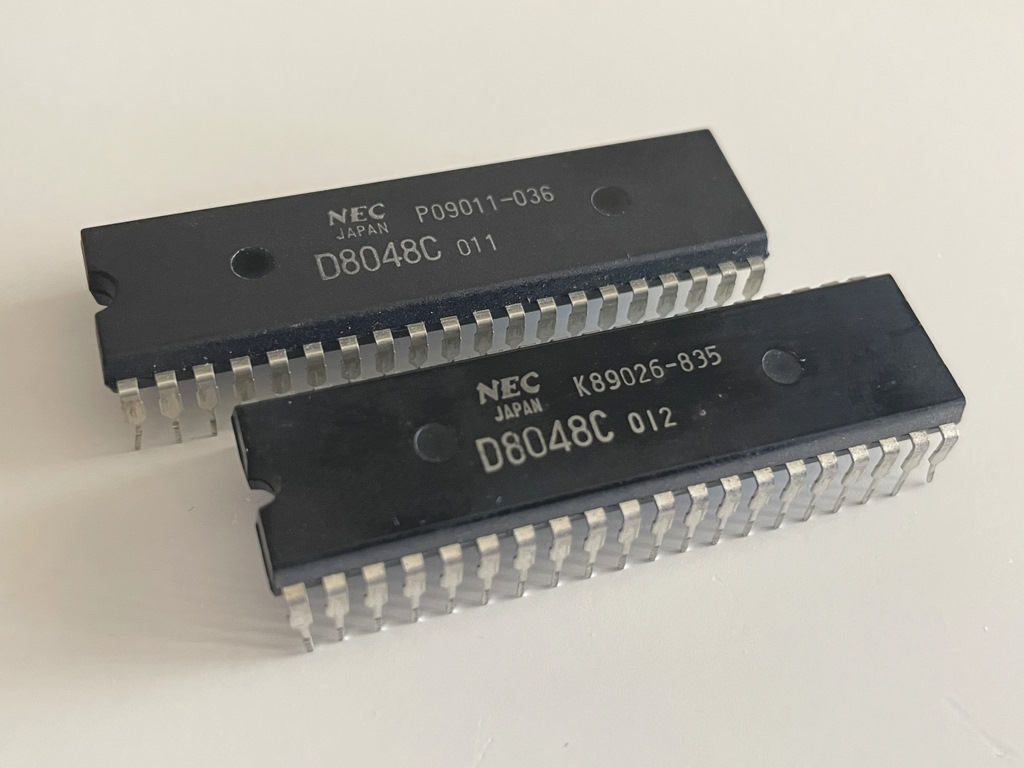
Both of the NEC 8048 Microcontrollers (012 gets installed in the motherboard socket, and 011 gets installed in the assigner board socket)

The Jupiter-4's most distinctive features were provided by virtue of its "compuphonic" digital control of the four voice cards, made possible by two NEC 8048 microcontrollers:

- An arpeggiator, with a choice of: up, down, up/down, or random mode. The arpeggiator can be prominently heard in Duran Duran's 1982 hit single "Rio." Switches on the far left select between the internal rate, adjustable, or an external source, such as the clock out of its contemporary, the Roland CR-78—a programmable analog drum machine. A hold button on the lower front panel allows users to latch or set a constantly running arpeggiator pattern, useful when playing leads on another machine over a JP-4 pattern. Otherwise the arpeggiation only responds when keys, individual or chords, are pressed. This allows for a more fluid and less rigid timing in live situations when playing with others.
- Left-hand modulation from the keyboard is unusual. The polyphonic portamento or glide feature can be used very effectively in conjunction with the arpeggiator and any preset. An octave down switch by the modulation wheel is also available independent of memorized settings. Unlike Moog or Sequential, the Roland modulation wheel goes left to right, and is spring-loaded. A short spike on top of the spring-loaded modulation wheel allows for an unusual rapid fanning, but risks damage to this out of production part. Knobs allow depth of pitch bend or LFO modulation, in addition to the amounts assigned and memorized. Toggle switches select bend or LFO to the wheel and onto any combination of VCO/VCF/VCA in an unusual selection pattern, all controlled by a single wheel motion.
- Four voice assignment modes, which, as well as simple one-VCO-per-voice polyphony, included the ability to affect four-VCO unison when one key was pressed, two VCOs per voice when two keys were pressed, and one VCO per voice when three or four keys were pressed. This effect can be heard on tracks such as "Seconds" by The Human League and "I Dream of Wires" by Gary Numan.

The final signal path also included a high-pass filter and a lush stereo chorus effect based on two, now rare, MN3004 ICs. The chorus circuit board is located underneath the modulation wheel, and has a single front button for enabling and disabling the effect. It is lush and wide, supplying a pseudo stereo effect when both audio outputs are used.

The Jupiter-4 had ten preset sounds and also featured eight memory locations for user-created patches. Saving to those locations requires two widely separated write record buttons to be held, to protect against accidental writing. A battery located deep between the chorus and power supply preserves the contents of the memory ICs.

The controls to the right of the arpeggiator are only live when the yellow manual button is selected. While all of the switches, sliders and potentiometers are analog, these controls interface digitally through the use of analog to digital converts in the signal path. They are supplied with hi/low logic voltages or 0–5 volt voltages. Multiplexers and analog to digital converters read the settings, then send them in digital form to the microcontroller. The microcontroller then converts these parameters to analog control voltages, and sends them to the voice cards and envelope gates. Despite being a relatively early synthesizer with hybrid digital control, it remains relatively stable.

Due to the low cost of the synthesizer, it managed to find its way into the hands of various musicians of the time, most of which were associated with the new wave and synthpop music scenes (see below). Philip Oakey of The Human League said of the Jupiter-4: "Ian also got a Jupiter 4 during the course of the recording but he took it away with him. What a fantastic, underrated synth that was. It was like a home organ with its horrible fake wood panels — eight programmable memories and eight presets!"

== Voice Card Revisions ==
Roland produced four major different types voice cards for the system: the early B/C and D cards which were based on BA662 for the filter, and the later E revision cards which were based on IR3109. Depending on which card is installed on the Jupiter-4, can influence what calibration procedures are required. It can be assumed each Jupiter-4 will generally have identical voice cards, unless they were sent for repair and exchange with a different revision, or a synth repair shop has swapped them out for others. While early JP-4 filters and all JP-4 envelope generators use the now rare BA662 VCA chips, they're starting to be reverse engineered by multiple third parties.

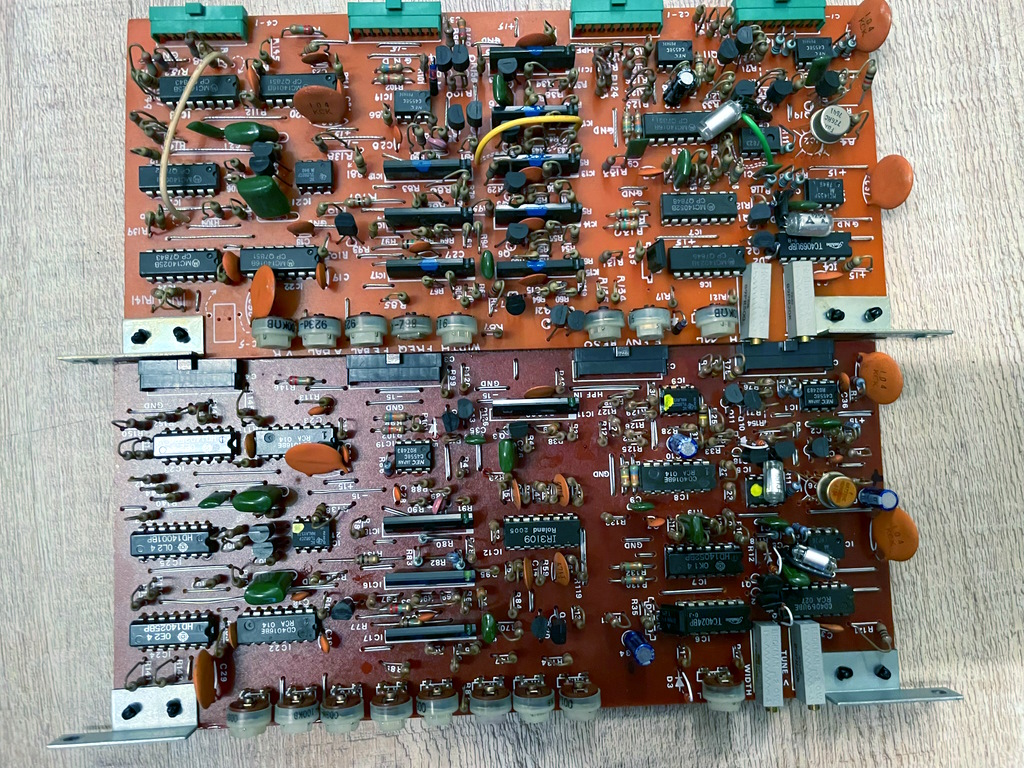
A revision D (top) compared against a revision E (bottom) voice card.

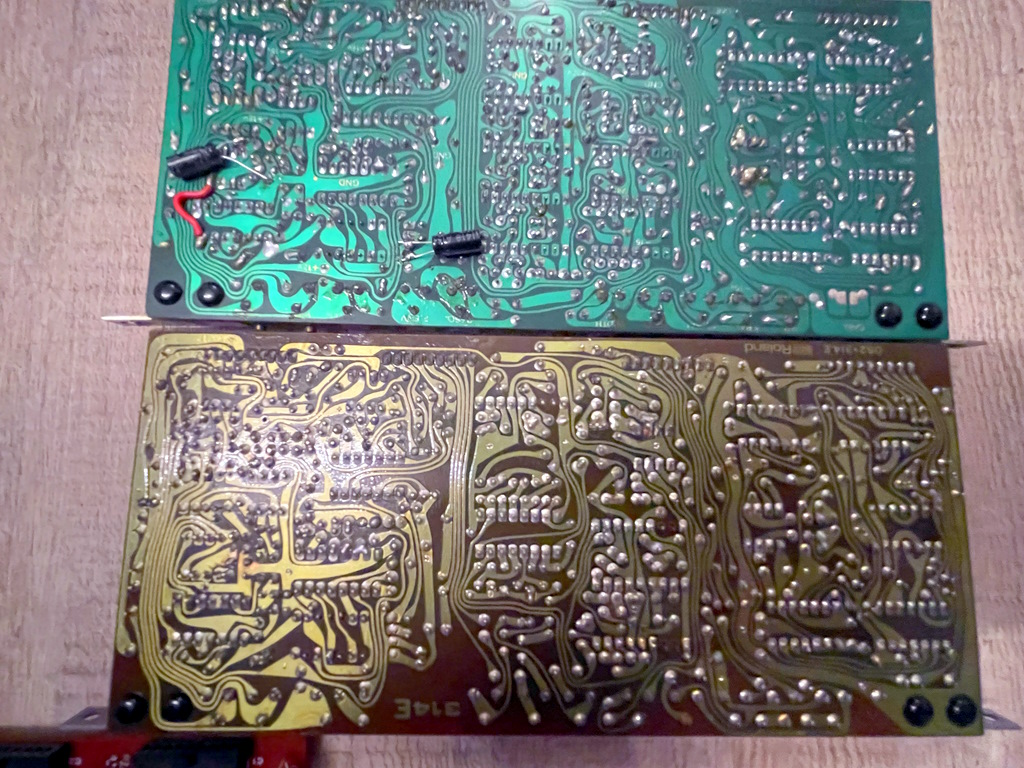
A revision D (top) compared against a revision E (bottom) voice card.

== Promars ==
In 1979, Roland released a two-oscillator monophonic synthesizer called the Promars, which is often considered a monophonic version of the Jupiter-4. The Promars lacked the Jupiter-4's arpeggiator and its "ensemble" chorus effect, and reduced the four voice cards to two with basic detune. It had the memory and preset selection buttons above the keyboard, which were less clumsy to use than those on the Jupiter-4 which were intended to be used on top of an organ. It also had 37 keys, making it slightly smaller than the Jupiter-4.

The Promars was used by Depeche Mode (around early-mid 1982), Vangelis (early/mid 1980s), The Enid, Jethro Tull, Landscape and Spandau Ballet (synth lead on 'To Cut a Long Story Short').

== Notable users ==
- The Cars
- Covenant, using (still to this day) a JP-4 as well as a Promars.
- Paul Davis Used in his self-titled 1980 LP
- Devo
- Thomas Dolby (The Golden Age of Wireless)
- Duran Duran (Duran Duran, Rio, Medazzaland)
- Michael Jackson (Thriller)
- Jon & Vangelis (Short Stories, The Friends of Mr Cairo, Private Collection)
- Late of the Pier
- Andy Whitmore (Greystoke Studios)
- Meat Beat Manifesto
- Men at Work (Business as Usual, Cargo)
- Gary Numan (Telekon, Dance)
- Tangerine Dream (Tangram)
- The Unicorns
- Wolf Parade
- Stevie Wonder
- Level 42 ("Last Chance" from The Pursuit of Accidents)
- David Bowie
- The Human League (Reproduction, Travelogue, Dare)
- Heaven 17 (Penthouse and Pavement)
- John Foxx
- Richard Barbieri of Japan (Gentlemen Take Polaroids)
- Isao Tomita
- Simple Minds (Empires and Dance, Sons and Fascination/Sister Feelings Call, New Gold Dream (81–82–83–84))
- The Moog Cookbook
- Vince Clarke
- Depeche Mode (Speak & Spell)
- Yazoo (Upstairs at Eric's)
- BT
- Saint Etienne
- Soft Cell
- Spandau Ballet (Journeys to Glory)
- The Spoons
- Vangelis
- Whodini - well known for the fast arpeggiator lead on "Magic's Wand" courtesy of Thomas Dolby
- Peter Howell Middle 8 and the brass sections of his interpretation of the Doctor Who Theme Tune.
- Paul McCartney (McCartney II)
- Kitarō
- Trans-X
- Nick Rhodes
- Compact Disk Dummies
- Patrick Carney, Theme to BoJack Horseman.
- Sharon Van Etten (Remind Me Tomorrow)
