= Chronicles (Jon and Vangelis album) =

Compilation album by Jon and Vangelis
- Released: 19 September 1994
- Recorded: 1979–83
- Genre: Electronic music
- Label: Polydor; Spectrum Music
- Producer: Vangelis

Jon and Vangelis chronology
Page of Life (1991)	Chronicles (1994)

Professional ratings
Review scores
Source	Rating
AllMusic	4/5 stars

Chronicles is a compilation album of Jon and Vangelis, released by Polydor/Spectrum Music in 1994.

== Track listing ==
All music by Vangelis; all lyrics by Jon Anderson

Track	Title	Length	Album
1	I Hear You Now	5:11	Short Stories
2	He Is Sailing	6:48	Private Collection
3	Thunder	2:14	Short Stories
4	Beside	4:07	The Friends of Mr Cairo
5	Birdsong	1:29	Short Stories
6	A Play Within a Play	7:00	Short Stories
7	And When the Night Comes	4:37	Private Collection
8	Deborah	4:56	Private Collection
9	Curious Electric	6:39	Short Stories
10	The Friends of Mr Cairo (Single Edit)	4:20	The Friends of Mr Cairo
11	Back to School	4:56	The Friends of Mr Cairo
12	Italian Song	2:54	Private Collection
13	Polonaise	5:25	Private Collection
14	Love Is	5:45	Short Stories

== Personnel ==
- Jon Anderson - vocals
- Vangelis - keyboards / synthesisers / programming

Music composed by Vangelis & Jon Anderson
Lyrics by Jon Anderson

Arranged and Produced by Vangelis.
