= A Short Story About Love =

- Fringe episode
- Episode no.: Season 4 Episode 15
- Directed by: J.H. Wyman
- Written by: J.H. Wyman; Graham Roland
- Production code: 3X7015
- Original air date: March 23, 2012

Guest appearances
- Michael Cerveris as September; Michael Massee as Anson Carr; Ona Grauer as Dianna Sutter

Episode chronology
← Previous "The End of All Things"	Next → "Nothing As It Seems"
- Fringe season 4

"A Short Story About Love" is the fifteenth episode of the fourth season of the Fox science-fiction drama television series Fringe, and the series' 80th episode overall. The series follows members of a Federal Bureau of Investigation "Fringe Division" team based in Boston, Massachusetts that uses "fringe" science and FBI investigative techniques to investigate a series of unexplained, often ghastly occurrences, which are related to mysteries surrounding a parallel universe. "A Short Story About Love" centered on a scientist extracting the pheromones of his victims, all male spouses, and using the resulting substances as a perfume to get close to their wives. While the Fringe team investigates, Peter learns more about the Observer September.

It was co-written by executive producer J.H. Wyman and co-producer Graham Roland. Wyman also directed, making the episode his directional debut. He sought to write a story that had love as a central motivation, and described it as "an episode that's really close to me." Guest stars featured in the episode included Michael Massee as the villain Anson Carr, Ona Grauer as Dianna Sutter, and Michael Cerveris as September.

First airing on March 23, 2012, in the United States, "A Short Story About Love" was watched by an estimated 2.87 million viewers, a decrease from the previous episode. It received mixed to positive reviews from television critics; the villain attracted mixed reviews, and most praised the revelations surrounding a beacon that was last shown in a first-season episode. In 2013, it landed on several lists detailing the best Fringe episodes of the series.

== Plot ==
The Fringe division tracks down a series of deaths of wives shortly after the deaths of their respective husbands. Discovering traces of the husbands' DNA on the bodies of the wives, Walter Bishop (John Noble) suspects that the killer is using pheromones taken from the husbands to get close to the wives, using the substances as a perfume. Further identifying castoreum within the pheromone mix, they identify the murderer as Anson Carr (Michael Massee), a former and disgruntled employee of a perfume company afflicted with a rare skin disease. They arrive at Carr's home to find another husband, already dead, in a dehydration chamber, and race to protect his wife, Dianna (Ona Grauer). When no attack comes at the wife, Olivia Dunham (Anna Torv) realizes that her husband may have been having an affair, and races to the mistress' home, stopping Carr before he can kill her. As he is taken away, he admits he was trying to discover what love was, scientifically, so that he could reproduce it and allow the entire world to share in it.

During the investigation, Olivia finds that the memories she is gaining from Peter Bishop's (Joshua Jackson) original timeline are overriding her original memories. Nina Sharp (Blair Brown) becomes concerned and suggests that Olivia talk to Walter to help reverse the memory loss. During the case, in talking with the latest victim's wife, Olivia realizes that she is truly in love with Peter. After the conclusion of the case, she admits to Nina that she will let the memory alterations continue, even if this means she will forget the times she spent with Nina during her childhood.

Simultaneous to these events, Peter has attempted to flee to New York City and points beyond to stay away from Olivia, fearing that staying near her would further erode her original memories. Walter calls him back, identifying that the Observer September (Michael Cerveris) had implanted something in Peter's eye during the events of the previous episode. The small disc reveals a nearby address, where Peter finds a stash of September's Observer equipment, including a GPS-like device that leads him to a strange pod (as shown previously in "The Arrival"). Peter is ultimately able to activate the pod, where September appears. September states the pod acts as a beacon, allowing him to return after the other Observers hid the universe from him. In response to Peter's questions about trying to return to his own timeline, September states that Peter is actually home; he was never truly erased from time as his love for his friends, and their love for him brought him back. September soon vanishes, and the pod buries itself in the ground. The episode closes as Peter and Olivia rejoin each other with a passionate kiss.

== Production ==
"To us, Jeff and I, it's kind of like a perfect version of what a Fringe show is because it has a great terrifying element to it which is very 'fringy.' On the other hand it has this incredible love story aspect and things that people are going to be really, really excited for, we believe, as far as the relationships in the show. So it was an honor to do it and it was just incredible. It turned out really well. We love it. It was just an incredible experience."

— J.H. Wyman on writing and directing the episode

"A Short Story About Love" was co-written by executive producer J.H. Wyman and co-producer Graham Roland. Wyman stated that the episode had "scary" and "romantic" themes, and as the title indicated, was "all about motivation. Love is a great motivator, for good and evil." He and fellow executive producer Jeff Pinkner believed the episode was "kind of like a perfect version of what a Fringe show is," because it depicted "fringy" elements in the form of killings while using love and relationships as central plot drivers. Wyman added that it was a "culmination of what I could describe as — it’s a direction where we’ve been heading and I think the fans will be really happy and satisfied."

Co-showrunner Wyman also served as episode director, marking his television directorial debut. He noted his love of the experience, as it permitted him to grow closer with the series' actors and "actually work with them on a level that [he hadn't] before and really get down there with them." Wyman was originally supposed to direct several episodes the previous year and earlier in the season, but found he was too busy. He explained, "Then an episode was coming up that we were thinking about writing and I really felt close to it. The opportunity came up where somebody had fallen out and I felt that this is the perfect time because everything was completely under control. It allowed me to go and do it. It's an episode that's really close to me. It's about love and it's about all the great things that we talk about on Fringe."

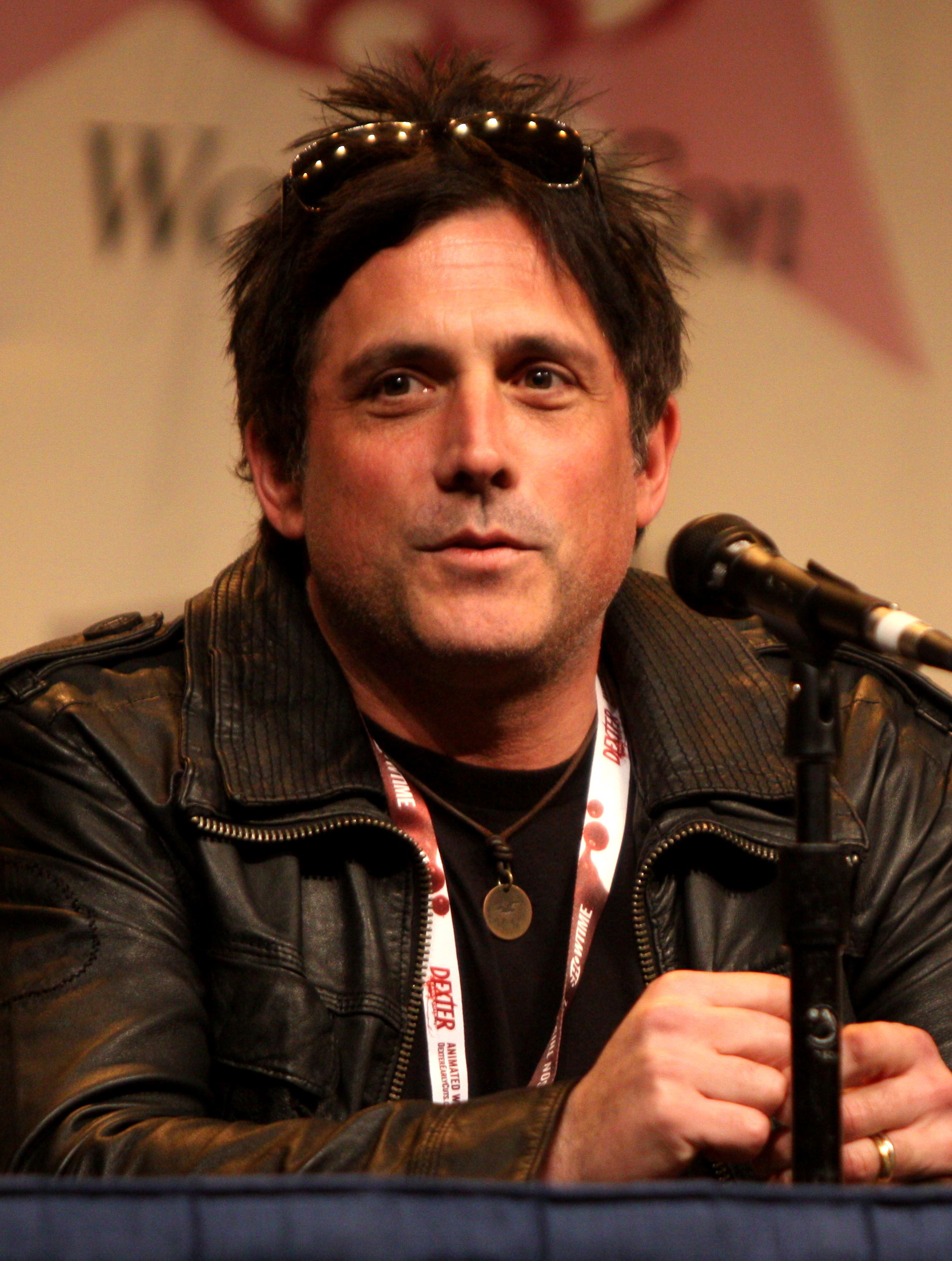
The episode featured the directional debut of executive producer J.H. Wyman.

Actor Joshua Jackson was pleased that Wyman directed, as he found it nice to have "somebody who's in the writer's room day-in and day-out and knows the show so intimately, come in and jump behind the camera and are just a font of information." Seth Gabel was also happy with Wyman's direction, as the two were able to discuss themes in the script as well as how Wyman planned to shoot certain scenes. Gabel remarked that the director "wanted to do this fun thing that actually related to Lincoln's feelings about Olivia and how they were changing based on everything that's been happening. We played so many things that weren't in the script, that were between the lines in just looks, and he told me how he was gonna shoot it so I could really play with what the character was thinking and know that it would actually be seen in the end, and not end up on the cutting room floor because it wasn't in the script."

Guest actor Michael Massee appeared as Anson Carr, the episode's villain. Wyman believed that the character was "terrifying" and "definitely one of the most frightening bad guys we’ve had." Other guest stars included Michael Cerveris as September and Ona Grauer as Dianna Sutter. The episode featured two pieces of music: "White Rabbit" by Jefferson Airplane and "The Friends of Mr Cairo" by Jon & Vangelis.

== Reception ==
=== Ratings ===
"A Short Story About Love" was first broadcast on March 23, 2012, in the United States on the Fox network after a month hiatus. An estimated 2.87 million viewers watched the episode, marking a decrease in viewership from the previous episode. "A Short Story About Love" earned a ratings share of 0.9/3 among adults aged 18 to 49, meaning that it was seen by 0.9 percent of all 18- to 49-year-olds, and 3 percent of all 18- to 49-year-olds watching television at the time of broadcast. Among total viewers it placed in third for the night and second among adults.

=== Reviews ===
The episode received mixed to positive reviews from television critics. IGN's Ramsey Isler rated "A Short Story About Love" with 8.5 out of 10, an indication of a "great" episode. While he criticized the episode's "mystery-of-the-week" for detracting from the episode's other storylines, Isler thought it improved when it began depicting Walter's investigation of September. Other stated highlights of the episode included Noble's performance and the reappearance of the beacon from an early first-season episode, the latter of which he noted, "Fans have been wondering for years what that damn thing was and how it played into the story." Isler concluded by observing that the story became "a little sappy" but was useful in "neatly" resolving the "'is he or isn't he?' drama that marked this season and set up the show to move onto the bigger task of crafting what could be the end of everything Fringe." Andrew Hanson of the Los Angeles Times was pleased that little was revealed of the villain's backstory, but believed the episode really improved once it focused on Peter exploring September's apartment. Like Isler, Hanson was happy to see the beacon again, explaining that he "love[s] any time Fringe reaches back to the crazy science of Season One."

"For the first 40 minutes, this episode was well-crafted but not particularly remarkable, but then that capsule spiraled out of the earth and made everything so much better."

— IGN's Ramsey Isler

Writing for The A.V. Club, Noel Murray gave the episode a B. He had an issue with the episode "reducing 'love' to an abstraction, for the sake of making it into a plot-driver," but noted that "at least 'A Short Story About Love' confines those wince-inducing reductions to a couple of short scenes, and in service of propelling this season’s 'displaced Peter' arc to a place that it needs to be." SFX's Dave Bradley was more critical of the episode, opining that the love premise failed to "completely satisfy, at least not on a rational level" and that the "orange" universe explanation felt like "hand-waving, a cheeky attempt to untangle the series’ continuum without any further universe-hopping." Bradley also noted that the plot surrounding the villain, a "mad scientist MacGuffin," seemed rushed and the script and direction "jarringly unsubtle", but that the episode featured good performances with "great details in every scene".

Jeff Jensen of Entertainment Weekly named "A Short Story About Love" the fifteenth best episode of the series, explaining "The timeline reboot of season 4 frustrated some fans, but the premise yielded several truly cool capture-the-imagination ideas that made for provocative drama, most notably Fringe's most romantic hour... The fact that the episode also featured one of the show's seediest creepazoids — a serial killer who murdered men for their pheromones so he could make a perfume that allowed him to seduce their grieving female significant others — was a bonus. Icky, but bonus." Cory Barker of TV.com named the episode the 17th best of the series, saying, "Fringe has never been afraid of coming up with intimate, emotionally based—and sometimes very hokey—resolutions for its grand plots. Whatever you think about the choices the writers made in Season 4, it's hard to deny the emotional wallop this episode delivered."
