= Moodswings (band) =

British electronic music duo

- Origin: United Kingdom
- Genres: Electronic, ambient, trance
- Years active: 1992–2002
- Labels: Water Music/Varèse Sarabande/Universal Records; Arista/BMG Records
- Past members: James F. T. Hood; Grant Showbiz

Moodswings were a British musical duo composed of Grant Showbiz and James F. T. Hood.

== History ==
Grant Showbiz was a onetime roadie and guitar tech who later produced albums by the Smiths, Billy Bragg, Silverfish, and Gong. James Hood was a former drummer for the Pretenders, the Impossible Dreamers, Kid Creole & the Coconuts, and Jeff Beck. After Showbiz and Hood teamed up in 1989, the duo released the album Moodfood (Arista/BMG, 1992), which scored a hit with a remade single of "Spiritual High (State of Independence) Pt. II", which featured vocals by Chrissie Hynde; (the original song is called "State of Independence" written by Jon Anderson and Vangelis from the Jon and Vangelis album The Friends of Mr Cairo). "Spiritual High Pt. III", from the same album, featured samples from Martin Luther King Jr.'s "I Have a Dream" speech.

The Live at Leeds EP (Arista) followed in 1994 (with artwork styled after the album by the Who of the same name), and in 1997, the group released Psychedelicatessen (Arista/BMG), which featured vocals from Tanita Tikaram, on the song "Oh Happy Day".

Grant Showbiz was a member of Moodswings up until the album Horizontal, which James Hood solo-produced (Varèse Sarabande, 2002). Julee Cruise sang vocals on two tracks from Horizontal: "Seems to Remind Me" and "Into the Blue". Johnny Marr also guests on three tracks. Hood contributed "Storm in a Teacup" from the same album for the 2005 documentary Do You Believe? Another World Is Possible.

== Impact ==
"Spiritual High II" was played during the closing credits of the 1992 Bridget Fonda film, Single White Female.

"The Great Sound of Letting Go" was featured in the Chris Morris radio series Blue Jam and its TV counterpart Jam.

== Discography ==
- Moodfood (1992)
- Live at Leeds (1994)
- Psychedelicatessen (1997)
- Horizontal (2002)

=== DVDs ===
- The Velvet Lounge (2002)
- Open Space — Volume 1 (2006)
- Pretenders Greatest Hits (2006)

== See also ==
- List of ambient music artists
