= Moodfood =

Studio album by Moodswings
- Released: August 25, 1992
- Genre: Tribal ambient, alternative dance, ambient dub, downtempo, house
- Length: 73:12
- Label: Arista
- Producer: Hood and Showbiz

Moodswings chronology
Moodfood (1992)	Live at Leeds (EP) (1994)

Professional ratings
Review scores
Source	Rating
AllMusic	3/5 stars
Entertainment Weekly	B
NME	7/10

Moodfood is the debut album by Moodswings, released in 1992. J.F.T. Hood is the former drummer of the Pretenders & The Smiths. His Pretenders bandmate Chrissie Hynde & his Smiths bandmate Johnny Marr are featured prominently on the album. Grant Showbiz produced records for Billy Bragg & the Smiths.

== Track listing ==
All tracks are written by Hood/Showbiz, except where noted.

No.	Title	Writer(s)	Guest appearances	Length
1.	"Throw off the Shackles"			6:19
2.	"Moodswings Overture"			5:56
3.	"Problem Solved"			8:11
4.	"Skinthieves"		Step Parikian (guitar), Jeff Beck (guitar solo), Terry Disley (string arrangements)	6:08
5.	"Rainsong"	Waterhouse/Hynde	Linda Muriel (voice), Chrissie Hynde (vocal production), Terry Disley (string arrangement)	6:29
6.	"100% Total Success"			3:51
7.	"Microcosmic"			4:40
8.	"Spiritual High" (Part I)	Hood/Showbiz/Jon & Vangelis		5:23
9.	"Spiritual High (State of Independence)" (Part II)	Hood/Showbiz/Jon & Vangelis	Chrissie Hynde (vocals)	4:57
10.	"Spiritual High" (Part III)	Hood/Showbiz/Jon & Vangelis	Martin Luther King Jr. ("I Have a Dream" speech)	5:14
11.	"Thailand"			7:37
12.	"Hairy Piano"	Hood, Upchurch	Liz Upchurch (Steinway)	4:02
Total length:				73:12

== Personnel ==
=== Moodswings ===
- J.F.T. Hood – drums, producer
- Grant Showbiz – producer, keyboards

=== Additional musicians ===
- Nice + Nasty – Edits, 3d Sound effects & "Space Surfing"
- Kid Prince Moore – vocals
- Liz Upchurch – piano
- Amanda Vincent – piano on "Spiritual High"
- Johnny Marr – engineer, additional guitars
- Step Parikian – engineer
- Martin Hawkes – additional engineer
- Erick Labson – engineer, editing, mixing, post-production
- Mental Block – design, illustrations
- Peter Mountain – photography
- Rob Williams – photography

== Charts ==
Chart performance for Moodfood
Chart (1993)	Peak position
Australian Albums (ARIA)	178

== Notes ==
- "Skinthieves" was used as the theme for the TV series America's Most Wanted.
- "Spiritual High" is based on the Jon & Vangelis song "State of Independence" and features vocals by Chrissie Hynde. "Part III" incorporates excerpts from Martin Luther King Jr.'s "I Have a Dream" speech. "Part II" was featured in the film Single White Female. "Spiritual High" reached #6 on Billboard's Modern Rock Tracks chart.
- Moodfood was used as the basis for a laser light show at the Bishop Planetarium in Bradenton, Florida.
