= State of Independence =

1981 single by Jon and Vangelis

- 1984 reissue cover

Single by Jon & Vangelis

from the album The Friends of Mr Cairo
- B-side: "Beside"
- Released: 31 July 1981
- Recorded: 1981
- Genre: Electronic; pop
- Label: Polydor
- Composer: Vangelis
- Lyricist: Jon Anderson
- Producer: Vangelis

Music video
- "State Of Independence" on YouTube

"State of Independence" is a song written by Jon Anderson and Vangelis. The track was released as a single but did not chart. It subsequently became better known when Donna Summer released a cover version a year later in 1982. That became a top-20 UK hit single (and repeated the same feat 14 years later when issued as a remixed version in 1996) and a number one hit in the Netherlands. In 1992, a third version of the song — retitled "Spiritual High (State of Independence)" — was recorded and released as a single by Moodswings, with vocals by the Pretenders lead singer Chrissie Hynde.

== Original Jon and Vangelis version (and subsequent Anderson re-recordings) ==
Originally recorded in Paris by Jon and Vangelis for their 1981 album The Friends of Mr Cairo, the lyrics were improvised for the music which was conceived as spiritual and uplifting in a Byzantine style. Anderson described his state of flow:

The rhythm started and I began clapping my hands and I got into this really "up" sort of feeling ... I was singing all different kinds of things, which kept coming and hitting me, singing strange ideas that I wouldn't have even thought of. ... that went on for maybe 20 minutes. ... It was a joyful experience ... it's called the 'State of Independence' because to be independent is to be totally free and to be totally immersed in something around you and that's really what the song became.

— Jon Anderson, Vangelis: The Unknown Man (1994), page 59

Jon & Vangelis released "State of Independence" as a single in 1981, with "Beside" as the B-side. It was re-released in 1984 and this version peaked at No. 67 on the UK Singles Chart. Anderson recorded a new version of the song for his solo album Change We Must (1994) and a live acoustic version can be found on his Live from La La Land (2007). More recently, Anderson also performed the song live with the AndersonPonty Band.

=== Personnel ===
- Vangelis – keyboards, synthesizers
- Jon Anderson – vocals
- Dick Morrissey – saxophone

== Donna Summer version ==
"State of Independence"
- 1982 worldwide picture sleeve

Single by Donna Summer

from the album Donna Summer
- B-side: "Love Is Just a Breath Away"
- Released: 29 September 1982
- Recorded: January 1982
- Genre: Post-disco
- Length: 5:50 (album version); 4:28 (single version)
- Label: Geffen (US); Warner Bros. (Europe)
- Composer: Vangelis
- Lyricist: Jon Anderson
- Producer: Quincy Jones

Donna Summer singles chronology
"Love Is in Control (Finger on the Trigger)" (1982)	"State of Independence" (1982)	"I Feel Love (Patrick Cowley Remix)" (1982)

Music video
- "State Of Independence" on YouTube

=== Original cover version (and reissue) ===
American singer Donna Summer covered "State of Independence" on her tenth studio album Donna Summer (1982). Her version was produced by Quincy Jones. It was released as the second single from the album on 29 September 1982. Summer's version just missed the US top 40, peaking at No. 41 on the Billboard Hot 100. It did much better in Europe, including a one-week stay at number one on the Dutch Top 40, making it Summer's second chart-topper in the Netherlands. The single was reissued in Europe in 1990 following the release of the compilation album The Best of Donna Summer.

Summer's version is notable for its all-star choir which included Lionel Richie, Dionne Warwick, Michael Jackson, Brenda Russell, Christopher Cross, Dyan Cannon, James Ingram, Kenny Loggins, Peggy Lipton, Patti Austin, Michael McDonald, and Stevie Wonder.

=== 1996 remixes ===
Following the dance chart success of the 1995 remix of Donna Summer's "I Feel Love", PolyGram issued a remixed version of Summer's recording of "State of Independence". The single was released both on 12" vinyl and CD on PolyGram's sub-label Manifesto. It peaked at No. 13 on the UK Singles Chart in 1996, going one place higher than the original release, with the dance mixes peaking at No. 1 on the UK Dance Singles Chart.

=== Charts ===
==== Weekly charts ====
Chart (1982)	Peak position
Australia (Kent Music Report)	19
France (SNEP)	58
Ireland (IRMA)	10
Luxembourg (Radio Luxembourg)	8
Netherlands (Dutch Top 40)	1
Netherlands (Single Top 100)	3
Spain Radio (Los 40)	26
UK Singles (Official Charts)	14
US Billboard Hot 100	41
US Hot R&B/Hip-Hop Songs (Billboard)	31
US Cash Box Top 100	46
US Black Contemporary Singles (Cash Box)	39
US Black Radio (Radio & Records)	26

Chart (1990)	Peak position
Netherlands (Single Top 100)	69
UK Singles (Official Charts)	45
UK Airplay (Music Week)	32

Chart (1996)	Peak position
Europe (Eurochart Hot 100)	51
Scottish Singles Sales (Official Charts)	17
UK Singles (Official Charts)	13
UK Dance (Official Charts)	4
UK Airplay (Music Week)	24
UK Club Chart (Music Week)	1
UK Pop Tip Club Chart (Music Week)	1

Chart (2012)	Peak position
UK Singles (OCC)	143
UK Dance (Official Charts)	23

==== Year-end charts ====
Chart (1982)	Rank
Netherlands (Dutch Top 40)	38
Netherlands (Single Top 100)	31

Chart (1996)	Rank
UK Club Chart (Music Week)	46
UK Pop Tip Club Chart (Music Week)	37

== Moodswings version ==
In 1992, the duo Moodswings released their album Moodfood, which scored a hit single with their cover version of the song, retitled as "Spiritual High (State of Independence) Pt. II" with vocals by Chrissie Hynde and samples from Martin Luther King Jr.'s 1963 "I Have a Dream" speech. The single peaked at No. 47 on the UK Singles Chart. Their version was later played during the closing credits on the soundtrack of Single White Female and it was also included on the Pretenders' Greatest Hits in 2000.
