= Page of Life =

Studio album by Jon and Vangelis
- Released: 9 September 1991
- Recorded: 1986
- Studio: Sound Studios, Athens; Forum Studios, Rome; Record Plant, Los Angeles
- Genre: Electronic; new age
- Length: 52:21
- Label: Arista (Germany/South Korea/Brazil/Argentina)
- Producer: Vangelis

Jon and Vangelis chronology
The Best of Jon and Vangelis (1984)	Page of Life (1991)	Chronicles (1994)

Singles from Page of Life
- 1. "Wisdom Chain" Released: 26 August 1991

Professional ratings
Review scores
Source	Rating
Allmusic	3/5 stars

Page of Life is the fourth and final studio album by Jon and Vangelis. It was recorded in 1986 in Athens and Rome and released in 1991 by Arista Records, and is their last studio collaboration as a duo. It was initially unavailable in the United States but was later re-released by Higher Octave with the bonus track "Change We Must", but missing four other tracks and other differences.

== Reception ==
Allmusic reviewer Jonathan Widran describes the songs on Page of Life as "amazing showcases" for Jon Anderson's singing and Vangelis' instrumentation; the lyrics are described as "clever social commentary". Widran singles out for praise the songs "Garden of Senses", "Anyone Can Light a Candle" and "Is It Love", which he describes as "whimsical and elegant."

The Kitchener-Waterloo Record describes the album as "a thoroughly pleasant album", with the title track featuring "overblown lyrics but a gorgeous vocal and instrumental performance". The Record also praises Vangelis' guitar sound on the fifth track, "Little Guitar".

== Track listing ==
1. "Wisdom Chain" (5:21)
2. "Page of Life" (3:16)
3. "Money" (6:07)
4. "Jazzy Box" (3:14)
5. "Garden of Senses" (6:23)
6. "Is It Love" (4:27)
7. "Anyone Can Light a Candle" (3:46)
8. "Be a Good Friend of Mine" (4:14)
9. "Shine for Me" (4:10)
10. "Genevieve" (3:48)
11. "Journey to Ixtlan" (5:50)
12. "Little Guitar" (1:45)

=== Alternate US release ===
The alternate US version was released in 1998, and was not approved by Vangelis. This version is different from the original release:

- The track "Change We Must" has been added.
- The tracks "Jazzy Box", "Is It Love", "Be a Good Friend of Mine" and "Journey to Ixtlan" have been dropped.
- "Wisdom Chain" appears in an expanded version that is longer than the original track, and contains different vocal arrangements.
- Several other tracks also have significant mix/timing or vocal differences, particularly "Money", "Garden of Senses" and "Genevieve".
- The track ordering is different.
1. "Change We Must" (6:28)
2. "Anyone Can Light a Candle" (3:43)
3. "Page of Life" (3:17)
4. "Money" (5:45)
5. "Little Guitar" (1:42)
6. "Garden of Senses" (6:42)
7. "Genevieve" (3:45)
8. "Shine for Me" (4:01)
9. "Wisdom Chain" (10:44)

=== 2013 remastered release ===
In 2013, Cherry Red Records released a remastered version of Page of Life, along with five other Vangelis albums. It contains the same tracks as the original 1991 album with an additional track, "Sing with Your Eyes".

1. "Wisdom Chain" (5:22)
2. "Page of Life" (3:16)
3. "Money" (6:08)
4. "Jazzy Box" (3:16)
5. "Garden of Senses" (6:22)
6. "Is It Love" (4:28)
7. "Anyone Can Light a Candle" (3:49)
8. "Be a Good Friend of Mine" (4:14)
9. "Shine for Me" (4:11)
10. "Genevieve" (3:47)
11. "Journey to Ixtlan" (5:51)
12. "Little Guitar" (1:49)
13. "Sing with Your Eyes" (bonus) (5:20)

== Personnel ==
- Jon Anderson - vocals
- Vangelis - keyboards, synthesisers, programming
- Rory Kaplan - "Is It Love" keyboards, synthesisers, drum programming
- Jimmy Haun - "Change We Must" Guitars

== Charts ==
Chart (1991)	Peak position
Dutch Albums (Album Top 100)	37
