= The End of All Things (Fringe) =

- Fringe episode
- Episode no.: Season 4 Episode 14
- Directed by: Jeff Hunt
- Written by: David Fury
- Production code: 3X7014
- Original air date: February 24, 2012

Guest appearances
- Michael Cerveris as September; Jared Harris as David Robert Jones; Monte Markham as Dr. Blake West; Eugene Lipinski as December; Amos Stern as July; Steve Weller as March

Episode chronology
| ← Previous "A Better Human Being" | Next → "A Short Story About Love" |
- Fringe season 4

"The End of All Things" is the fourteenth episode of the fourth season of the American science-fiction drama television series Fringe, and the series' 79th episode overall. In the episode, the fringe team investigates Olivia's (Anna Torv) disappearance, ultimately tracing back to David Robert Jones (guest star Jared Harris).

It was written by co-executive producer David Fury and directed by Jeff Hunt. The episode marked the beginning of a four-week break for the series, though the producers initially thought the gap would start with the following episode, "A Short Story About Love". Executive producer Jeff Pinkner called it a "game-changer" that would "peel back some layers" surrounding the Observer's background.

"The End of All Things" first aired on February 24, 2012 in the United States on the Fox network to an estimated 3.1 million viewers, an increase from the previous week. It received generally positive reviews from critics, with many praising Harris' performance and the unveiling of more of the series' mythology. In 2013, following the conclusion of the final season, IGN ranked the episode the fourth best of the entire series.

== Plot ==
Olivia Dunham (Anna Torv) has been taken to a disused medical facility by David Robert Jones (Jared Harris) and his agents. She is placed in the same room along with Nina Sharp (Blair Brown), also secured to a chair, revealing she was also abducted by Jones the night before. Jones arrives and asserts that Olivia has great abilities due to her Cortexiphan doping but he must coax them out of Olivia. He presents a light box test that Olivia should be able to activate with her mind, torturing Nina to create the emotional driver, but Olivia admits she can't do it without rest. During this period, Olivia, her memories a mix of her own and that of Olivia from Peter Bishop's (Joshua Jackson) timeline, asks Nina to help her make an emotional connection, but she recognizes that this Nina is not the real one but instead the one from the parallel universe. Olivia continues to play along, explaining to Nina that her Cortexiphan abilities could only be induced by being near Peter; Nina fakes illness to be extracted from the room, where she explains to a complicit Jones that they need to abduct Peter.

Following Olivia's disappearance, Peter discovers a surveillance camera in her apartment. He takes its memory device, which has been overwritten numerous times like a palimpsest, to Walter Bishop's (John Noble) laboratory, using forensic tools to examine previous images on the disc. Lincoln Lee (Seth Gabel) and Phillip Broyles (Lance Reddick) take Nina into custody, learning that someone with Nina's bio-metric signature had accessed the Massive Dynamic supply of Cortexiphan over the last few months; Nina is surprised by this but refuses to talk. As they work, Walter accuses Peter of taking advantage of Olivia's state, even if unintentionally, imprinting his memories of Olivia of the original timeline onto her. They identify a face belonging to Leland Spivey (Monte Markham), a man with ties to Jones and Nina, and Peter suspects that they are dosing Olivia with Cortexiphan for nefarious purposes. Their work is disrupted by the sudden appearance of the Observer September (Michael Cerveris), bleeding from a chest wound.

With September nearly dead, Peter decides to use Walter's equipment to enter the Observer's mind to try to learn of Olivia's location. Within September's consciousness, Peter learns the Observers are a team of scientists from one possible future of humanity, having used technology to travel to the past to witness their own creation. September, however, disrupted events by attempting to observe the point where Peter's cure was discovered, and his disruption has since caused several unintended changes within the timeline, including the war between the two universes. Ultimately, this would lead to the birth of Henry, Peter's child with the parallel universe's Olivia, which September claimed never should have happened and will be a catalyst for disruption of future events. By Peter entering the Machine and altering the timeline, Henry also ceased to exist. September explains that Peter's reappearance may be a means to set things right, and insists he find a way to reunite his romance with his original Olivia. As the reality of September's mind breaks down and he claims "they are coming", the Observer tells Peter to "go home". Peter is suddenly awakened in the lab, September's body goes into convulsions and vanishes.

Peter realizes that September's message was literal, and returns to his home, where he is knocked out by Jones' men. He is brought to the same facility as Olivia and tied up. As they prepare to torture him, Olivia begins to use her powers to activate the lights, not only on the box but within the facility, creating electrical sparks that kill one of Jones' men. As Jones and Nina retreat, Olivia frees Peter and they give chase, though Olivia suffers from a seizure, following excessive use of her powers. They catch up to Jones and Nina as they are crossing back to the parallel universe, but the two are able to escape. Peter contacts the authorities to bring medical help for Olivia. As they are waiting, Peter admits to Olivia that he fears what he has done to her memories, and has seen his original Olivia through the Observer's mind. He leaves her, believing that staying away from this Olivia would be for the best.

== Production ==
"It’s the 14th out of 22 episodes and it’s very much an episode that’s going to launch us into the back half of the episodes."

— Executive producer Jeff Pinkner on the episode

"The End of All Things" was written by co-executive producer David Fury and directed by CSI: Crime Scene Investigation veteran Jeff Hunt. It was Hunt's third series credit (his other two being "The Man from the Other Side" and "The Box"). Leading up to the episode's broadcast, executive producer Jeff Pinkner remarked in a conference call with journalists that it was a "game-changer" because "our characters learn a lot more and the audience is going to learn a lot more about the über-plot of the season’s bad guy, David Robert Jones." Referring to the Observer September, Pinker added that the episode would also peel "back some layers about what his agenda has been and use that as an opportunity to revisit the things on the show we’ve seen before." Fellow executive producer J.H. Wyman elaborated "We always said you would find out about the Observers this season and we were going to investigate them a lot more. We’re excited about it all. That’s a highlight – the Observers are a highlight. For us to constantly break what you know and reset and have people go, 'Wow, I didn’t see that coming!' That’s why we get up in the morning is to take people along for the ride. We’re excited about what’s coming up, too."

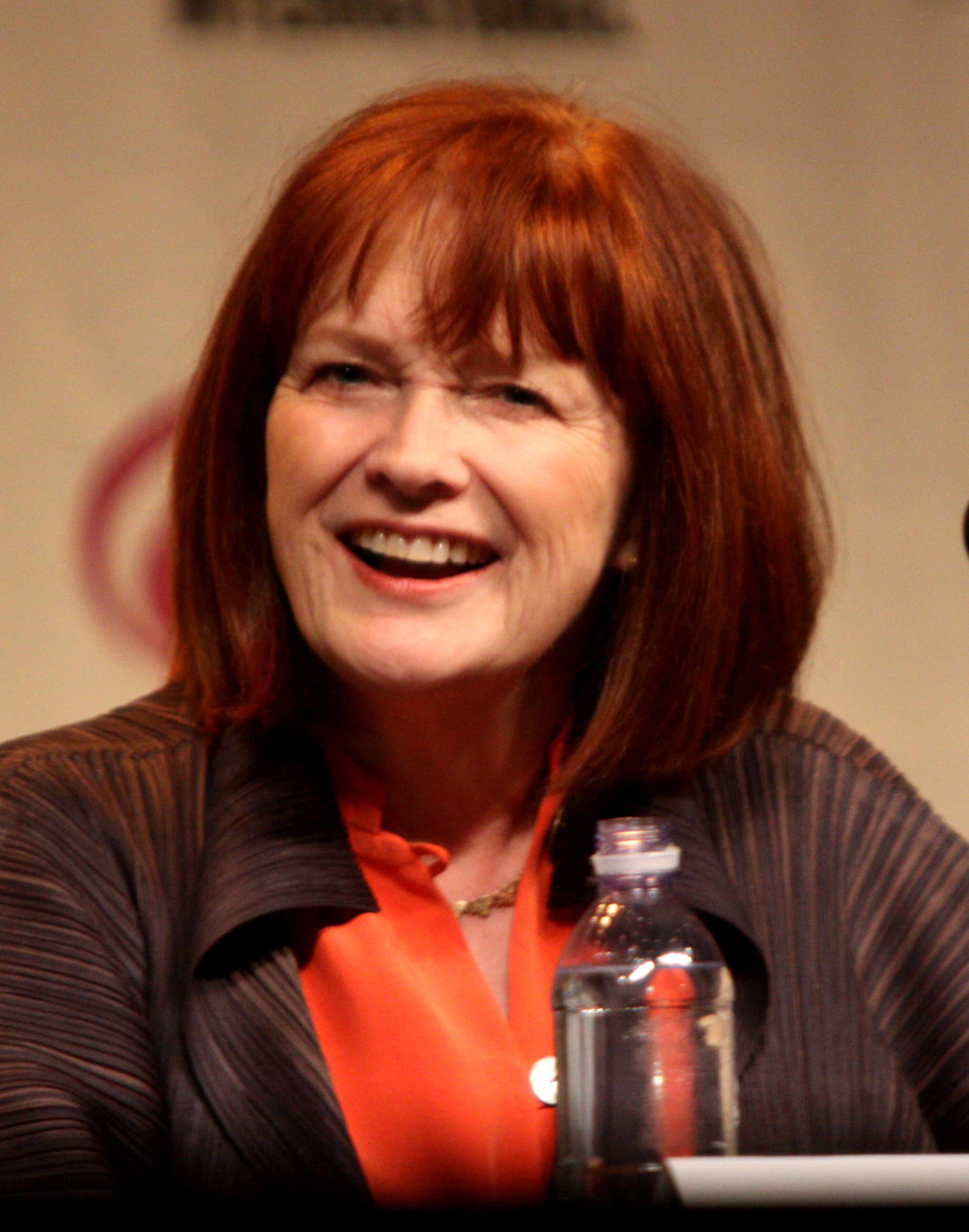
Actress Blair Brown injured herself while shooting the episode.

"The End of All Things" began a four-week break for the series, though the producers initially thought this gap would commence with the following episode. They were pleased that the switch did not cause issues, with Pinkner noting that "we’re sort of in a zone of episodes where each one is amazing and each one either turns the story or resolves something important or there’s a cliffhanger – several episodes where each one is pretty awesome in itself and is also important to the overall patchwork of the season. We were very happy this ended up being one before we went on a little break. I think the fans are going to be well satisfied to come back and watch the next one as well."

The episode was the first time that the characters of Nina Sharp and David Robert Jones had common scenes within the show, but both Blair Brown and Jared Harris had previously acted together as mother and son in an off-Broadway production of the play Humble Boy. During the scene in which Nina was tortured to taunt Olivia into using her powers, Brown actually injured herself on the rusty bedsprings used as the prop for the show. Brown referred to the alternative version of her character as "Meana" due to her seemingly "mean" personality, and speculated that Nina may have become this way because without William Bell, "she wasn’t at the party with all of the boys, the science boys" and thus developed an "outsider" perspective. She said of the role, "It’s a really interesting thing to play. I love the fact that they look exactly the same, at least for a while."

== Reception ==
=== Ratings ===
"The End of All Things" first aired on February 24, 2012 in the United States. The last episode before a four-week hiatus, it was watched by an estimated 3.1 million viewers, with a ratings share of 1.2, an improvement from the previous episode, "A Better Human Being". Fringe and its lead-in Kitchen Nightmares helped its network, Fox, tie for third place with NBC for the night.

=== Reviews ===
"Despite some minor disappointments, I don't think it's a stretch to say this was the best episode of the season so far. It had action, suspense, mystery, devious duplicitous villains, special effects, and a few Walter moments (that 'Well I didn't do any yanking' line was priceless). Let's hope that the remaining 8 episodes can give us more of the same."

— IGN writer Ramsey Isler

The episode has received generally positive reviews from television critics. Andrew Hanson of the Los Angeles Times remarked, "Great acting, a decent twist and the truth behind one of the most enigmatic characters in television history. Why can’t more Fringe episodes be like this? Why can’t more television be like 'Fringe?'". Hanson also lauded Jared Harris' performance, calling him "a fantastic villain. Arrogant and superior, with hints of insecurity. Jones’ speech about all living creatures needing incentive might have been goofy coming from any other actor, but from Harris, it is creepy beyond belief. So glad Fringe found a way to bring David Robert Jones back." IGN's Ramsey Isler rated it 9.0/10 for being a "fast-paced story" that was "the best episode of the season so far". He continued "Olivia's great escape from Jones and Bad Nina was fantastic television and some clever writing." Isler did find some of the Observer revelations "a bit of a let-down" however, as he felt he had already been made aware of them; this was not enough to make him critical of the episode.

Writing for The A.V. Club, columnist Noel Murray graded the episode with an A−, and praised September's stumbling entrance into the lab as "yet another rich and remarkable scene". Entertainment Weekly writer Jeff Jensen had a more negative opinion, and commented that the episode "failed to make my dinger hum," which he attributed to high expectations set by fellow staff writer and former Fringe reviewer Ken Tucker. Jensen continued, "It was, to my eyes, 'just okay.' Certainly not the equal of the past two episodes. And not the strongest possible kicker to a strong second act for Fringe's fourth season, which now takes a four-week snooze before rising anew on March 23 for the first of eight consecutive episodes – a sweep of story that might represent the very end of all things Fringe. Damn, I’m such a downer this week, aren’t I? Ah, but so was this episode." In January 2013, IGN ranked the episode as the fourth best episode of the series, explaining that "when Season 4 needed a boost of excitement, this episode delivered it in a timely fashion. It had a thrilling pace and offered answers to some questions that have lingering since the series began."
