= I Have a Dream =

1963 speech by Martin Luther King Jr.

- Part of the March on Washington for Jobs and Freedom and the civil rights movement
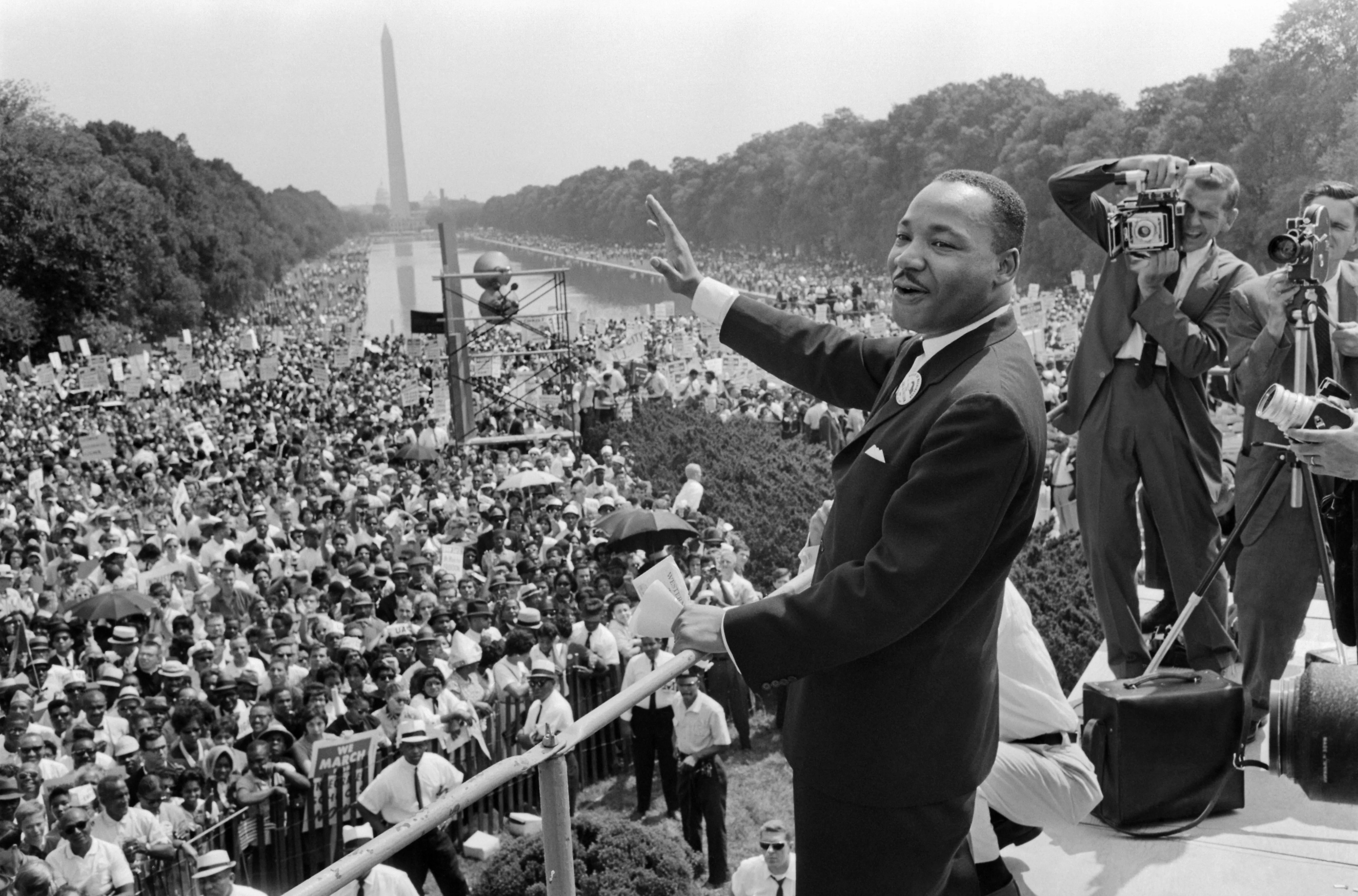
- Martin Luther King Jr. after delivering the speech
- Date: August 28, 1963
- Location: 38°53′21″N 77°03′00″W
- Type: Speech by Martin Luther King Jr.
- Motive: Supporting African American civil and economic rights, and racial equality in the United States

"I Have a Dream" is a public speech that was delivered by American civil rights activist and Baptist minister Martin Luther King Jr. during the March on Washington for Jobs and Freedom on August 28, 1963. In the speech, King called for civil and economic rights and an end to legalized racism in the United States. Delivered to over 250,000 civil rights supporters from the steps of the Lincoln Memorial in Washington, D.C., the speech was one of the most famous moments of the civil rights movement and among the most iconic speeches in American history.

Beginning with a reference to the Emancipation Proclamation, which declared millions of slaves free in 1863, King said: "one hundred years later, the Negro still is not free". Toward the end of the speech, King departed from his prepared text for an improvised peroration on the theme "I have a dream". In the church spirit, Mahalia Jackson lent her support from her seat behind him, shouting, "Tell 'em about the dream, Martin!" just before he began his most famous segment of the speech. Taylor Branch writes that King later said he grasped at the "first run of oratory" that came to him, not knowing if Jackson's words ever reached him. Jon Meacham writes that, "With a single phrase, King joined Jefferson and Lincoln in the ranks of men who've shaped modern America".

The speech was ranked the top American speech of the 20th century in a 1999 poll of scholars of public address. The speech was described by journalist Sean O'Grady in The Independent as having "a strong claim to be the greatest in the English language of all time".

== Background ==
The March on Washington for Jobs and Freedom was partly intended to demonstrate mass support for the civil rights legislation proposed by U.S. president John F. Kennedy in June 1963. Martin Luther King Jr. and other leaders, therefore, agreed to keep their speeches calm to avoid provoking the civil disobedience which had become the hallmark of the civil rights movement. King originally designed his speech as a homage to Abraham Lincoln's 1863 Gettysburg Address, timed to correspond with the centennial of Lincoln's 1863 Emancipation Proclamation.

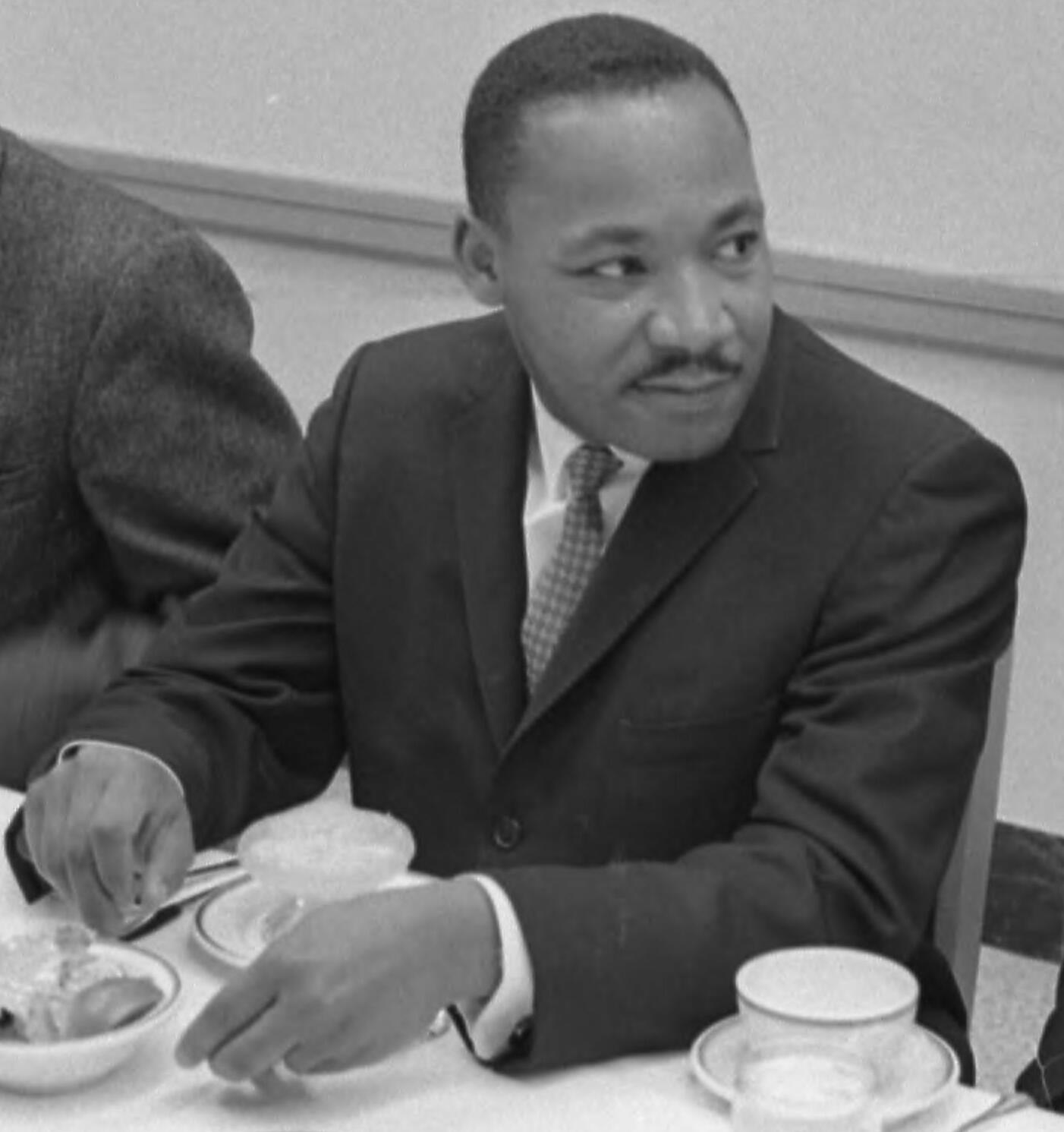
Martin Luther King Jr. in 1962

=== Speech title and the writing process ===
King had been preaching about dreams since 1960, when he gave a speech to the National Association for the Advancement of Colored People (NAACP) called "The Negro and the American Dream". This speech discusses the gap between the American Dream and reality, saying that avowed white supremacists have violated the dream, and that "our federal government has also scarred the dream through its apathy and hypocrisy, its betrayal of the cause of justice". King suggests that "It may well be that the Negro is God's instrument to save the soul of America." In 1961, he spoke of the civil rights movement and student activists' "dream" of equality—"the American Dream ... a dream as yet unfulfilled"—in several national speeches and statements and took "the dream" as the centerpiece for these speeches.

On November 27, 1962, King gave a speech at Booker T. Washington High School in Rocky Mount, North Carolina. That speech was longer than the version which he would eventually deliver from the Lincoln Memorial. And while parts of the text had been moved around, large portions were identical, including the "I have a dream" refrain. After being rediscovered in 2015, the restored and digitized recording of the 1962 speech was presented to the public by the English department of North Carolina State University.

King had also delivered a speech with the "I have a dream" refrain in Detroit, in June 1963, before 25,000 people in Detroit's Cobo Hall immediately after the 125,000-strong Great Walk to Freedom on June 23, 1963. Reuther had given King an office at Solidarity House, the United Auto Workers headquarters in Detroit, where King worked on his "I Have a Dream" speech in anticipation of the March on Washington. Mahalia Jackson, who sang "How I Got Over" at the march just before King's speech, knew about the Detroit speech. After the March on Washington, a recording of King's Cobo Hall speech was released by Detroit's Gordy Records as an LP entitled The Great March To Freedom.

The March on Washington for Jobs and Freedom, August 28, 1963

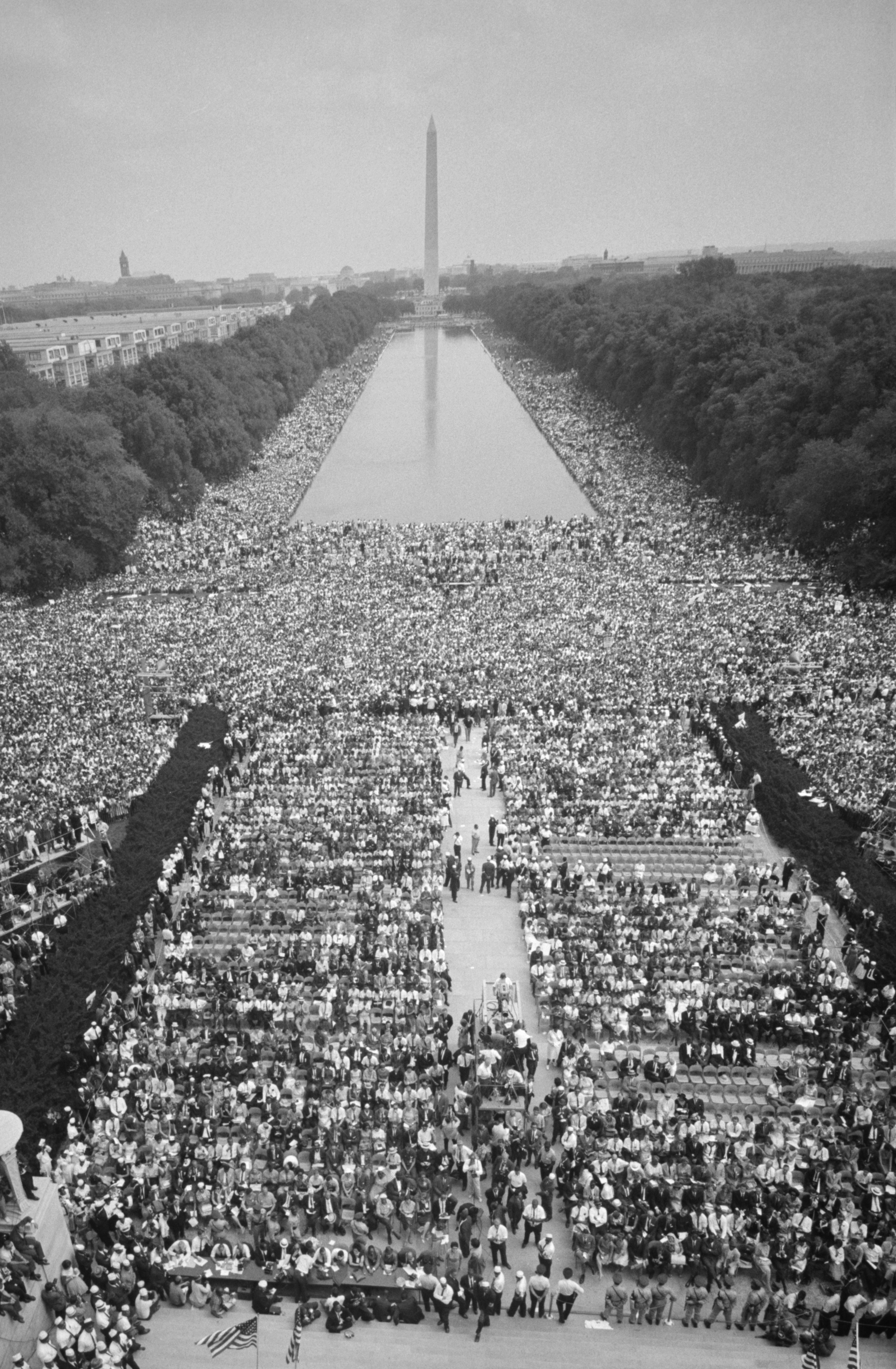
View from the Lincoln Memorial east across the National Mall, toward the Washington Monument

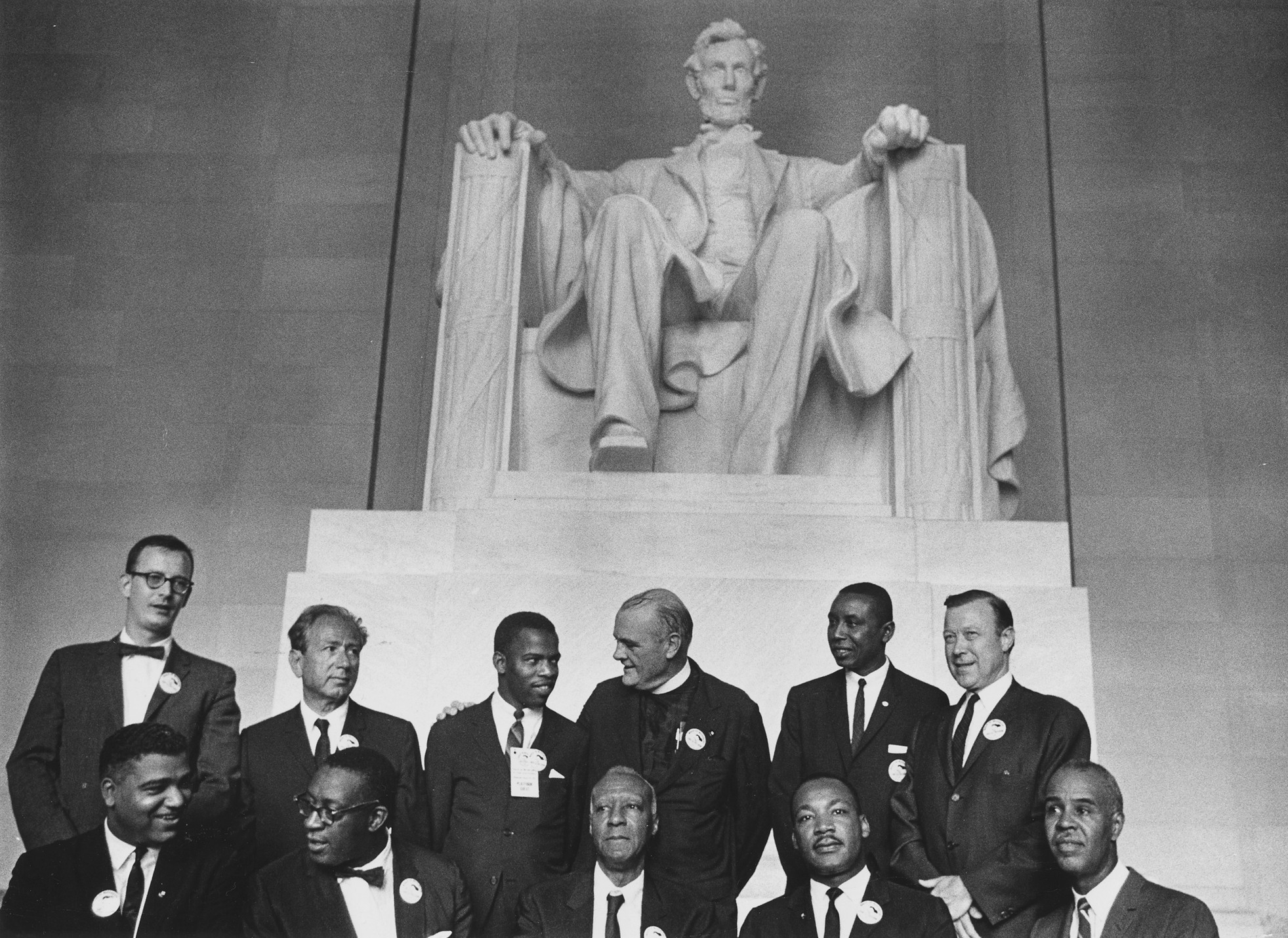
Leaders of the march in front of Abraham Lincoln's statue at the memorial; King is in the front row, second from right (Note: Left to right: Back row: Mathew Ahmann, Joachim Prinz, John Lewis, Eugene Carson Blake, Floyd McKissick, and Walter Reuther Front row: Whitney Young, Cleveland Robinson, A. Philip Randolph, King, and Roy Wilkins)

King's speech at the March on Washington was drafted with the assistance of Stanley Levison and Clarence Benjamin Jones in Riverdale, New York City. Jones has said that "the logistical preparations for the march were so burdensome that the speech was not a priority for us" and that, "on the evening of Tuesday, Aug. 27, (12 hours before the march) Martin still didn't know what he was going to say".

The speech has been shown to have had several versions, written at several different times. It has no single version draft, but is an amalgamation of several drafts, and was originally called "Normalcy, Never Again". Little of this, and another "Normalcy Speech", ended up in the final draft. A draft of "Normalcy, Never Again" is housed in the Morehouse College Martin Luther King Jr. Collection of the Robert W. Woodruff Library, Atlanta University Center and Morehouse College. The focus on "I have a dream" comes through the speech's delivery. Toward the end of its delivery, King departed from his prepared remarks and started "preaching" improvisationally, punctuating his points with "I have a dream." In the church spirit, Mahalia Jackson lent her support from her seat behind him, shouting, "Tell 'em about the dream, Martin!" just before he began his most famous segment of the speech. Taylor Branch writes that King later said he grasped at the "first run of oratory" that came to him, not knowing if Jackson's words ever reached him.

== Speech ==
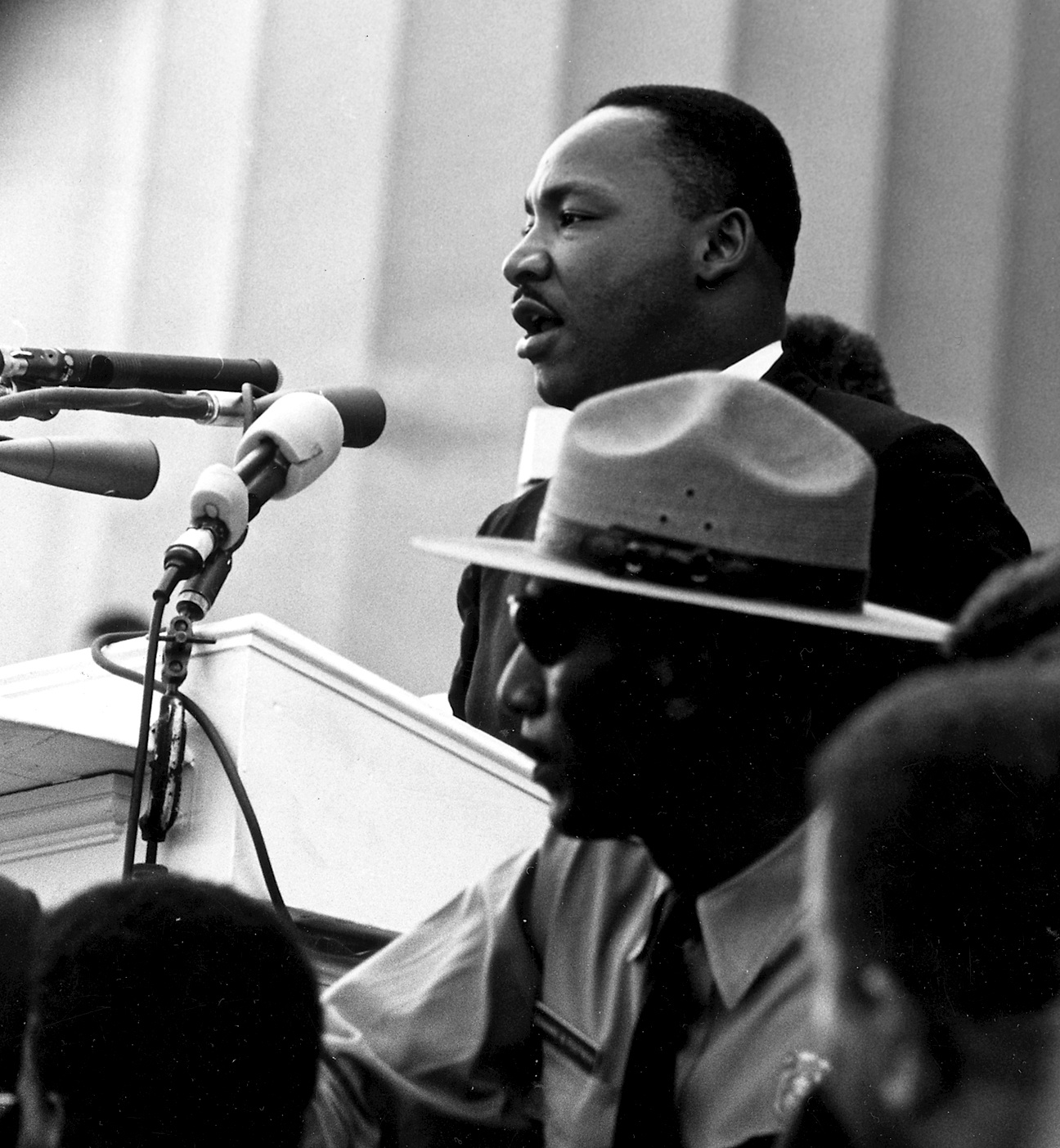
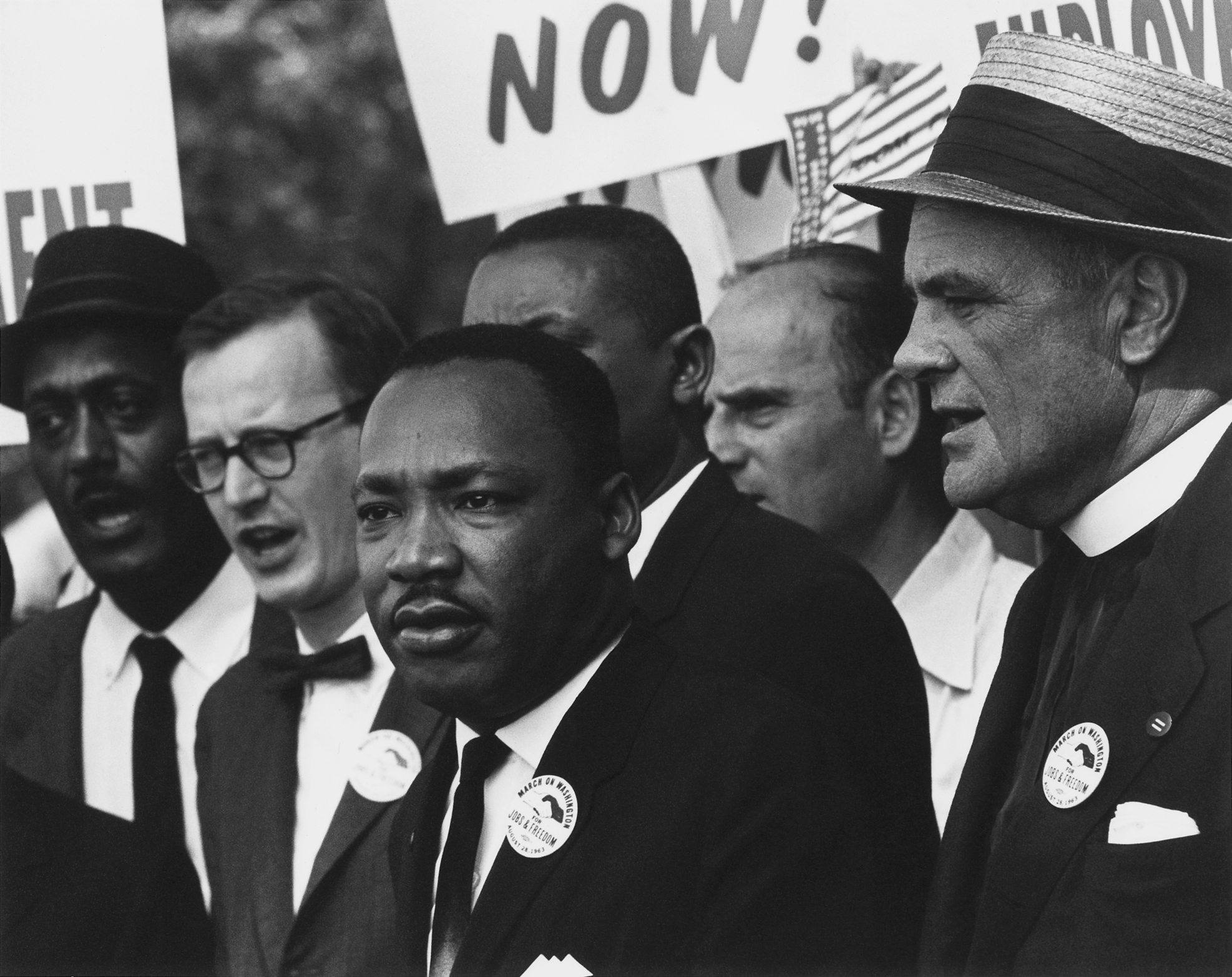
King giving the speech

The ideas in the speech reflect King's social experiences of ethnocentric abuse, mistreatment, and exploitation of Black people. The speech draws upon appeals to America's myths as a nation founded to provide freedom and justice to all people, and then reinforces and transcends those secular mythologies by placing them within a spiritual context by arguing that racial justice is also in accord with God's will. Thus, the rhetoric of the speech provides redemption to America for its racial sins. King describes the promises made by America as a "promissory note" on which America has defaulted. He says that "America has given the Negro people a bad check", but that "we've come to cash this check" by marching in Washington, D.C.

Audio recording
- I Have a Dream, per the Educational Radio Network

Widely hailed as a masterpiece of rhetoric, King's speech alludes to pivotal documents in American history, including the Emancipation Proclamation, the US Declaration of Independence, and the US Constitution. Early in the speech, he alludes to the Gettysburg Address by saying: "Five score years ago ...". In reference to the abolition of slavery articulated in the Emancipation Proclamation, King says: "It came as a joyous daybreak to end the long night of their captivity."

King's speech used words and ideas from his own speeches and other texts. For years, he had quoted from Samuel Francis Smith's popular patriotic hymn "America (My Country, 'Tis of Thee)", and referred extensively to the Bible. The idea of constitutional rights as an "unfulfilled promise" was suggested by Clarence Jones. The speech, in the cadences of a sermon, is infused with allusions to biblical verses, including Isaiah 40:4–5 ("I have a dream that every valley shall be exalted ...") and Amos 5:24 ("But let justice roll down like water ...").

Notable quotations
"I Have a Dream"	The Declaration of Independence (1776)
I have a dream that one day, this nation will rise up, and live out the true meaning of its creed: 'We hold these truths to be self-evident: that all men are created equal.' I have a dream.	We hold these truths to be self-evident, that all men are created equal, that they are endowed by their Creator [God] with certain unalienable Rights, that among these are Life, Liberty and the pursuit of Happiness.
Five score [100] years ago [1863], a great American, in whose symbolic shadow we stand today, signed the Emancipation Proclamation. This momentous decree came as a great beacon light of hope to millions of Negro slaves, who had been seared in the flames of withering injustice.	Abraham Lincoln's Gettysburg Address (1863)
Five score [100] years ago [1863], a great American, in whose symbolic shadow we stand today, signed the Emancipation Proclamation. This momentous decree came as a great beacon light of hope to millions of Negro slaves, who had been seared in the flames of withering injustice.	Four score [80] and seven years ago [1776], our fathers brought forth on this continent, a new nation, conceived in Liberty, and dedicated to the proposition that all men are created equal.

Anaphora (the repetition of a phrase at the beginning of sentences) is employed throughout the speech. Early in his speech, King urges his audience to seize the moment; "Now is the time" is repeated three times in the sixth paragraph. The most widely cited example of anaphora is found in the often quoted phrase "I have a dream", which is repeated eight times as King paints a picture of an integrated and unified America for his audience. Other occasions include "One hundred years later", "We can never be satisfied", "With this faith", "Let freedom ring", and "free at last". King was the sixteenth out of eighteen people to speak that day, according to the official program. Among the most quoted lines of the speech are "I have a dream that my four little children will one day live in a nation where they will not be judged by the color of their skin but by the content of their character. I have a dream today!"

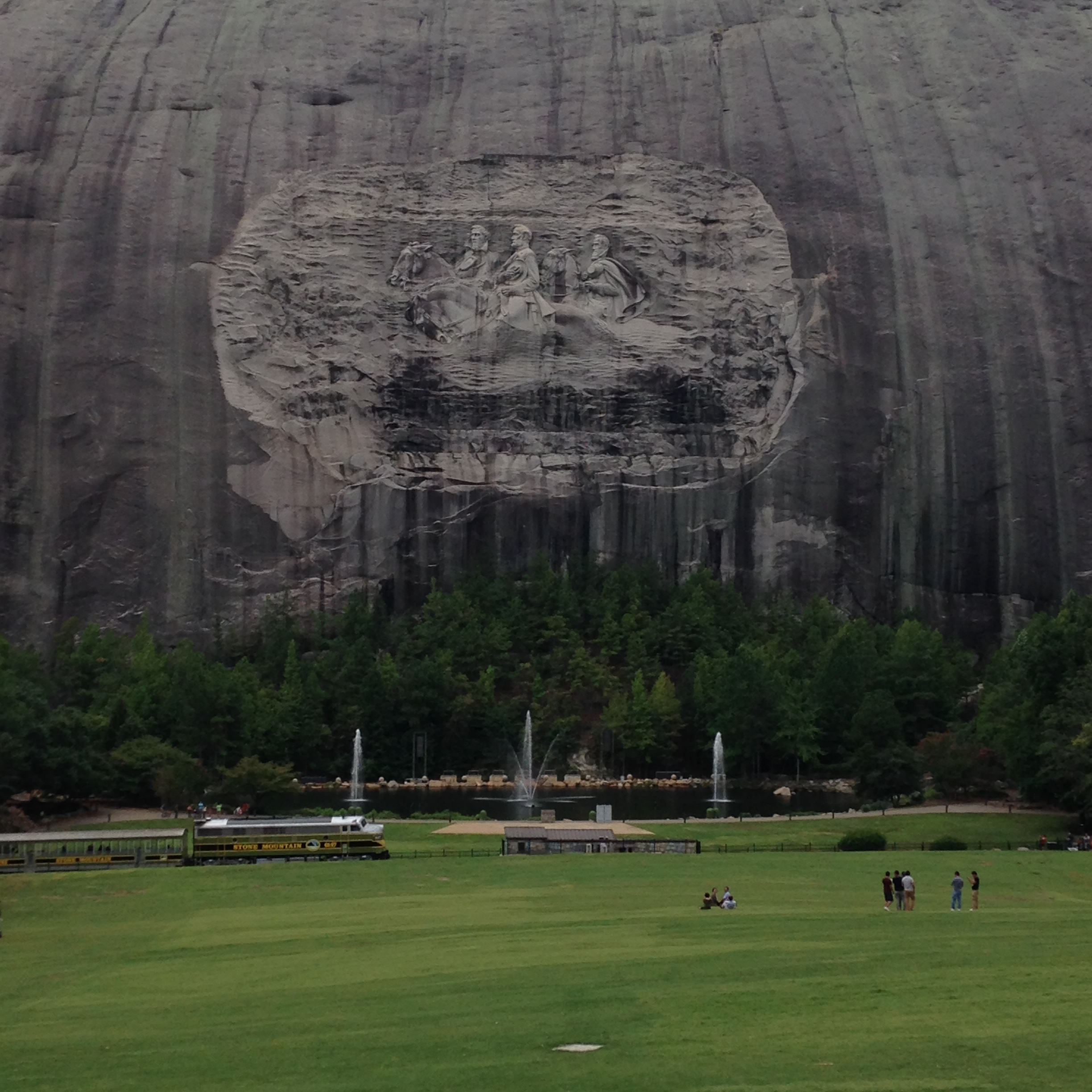
Stone Mountain in Georgia, upon which a memorial to Confederate leaders was engraved in the 1920s

King alludes to the Ku Klux Klan when he calls to "let freedom ring from Stone Mountain of Georgia", near Atlanta; the mountain was a gathering spot for Klan members in the early 20th century. In the 1920s, the mountain's owners—members themselves—engraved upon it a memorial to leaders of the Confederacy: Confederate president Jefferson Davis, and Confederate Army generals Robert E. Lee and Stonewall Jackson.

The end of King's speech alludes to Galatians 3:28: "There is no longer Jew or Greek, there is no longer slave or free, there is no longer male and female; for all of you are one in Christ Jesus". He also alludes to the opening lines of Shakespeare's Richard III ("Now is the winter of our discontent / Made glorious summer ...") when he remarks that "this sweltering summer of the Negro's legitimate discontent will not pass until there is an invigorating autumn ..."

=== Rhetoric ===
The speech can be dissected by using three rhetorical lenses: voice merging, prophetic voice, and dynamic spectacle. Voice merging is the combining of one's own voice with religious predecessors. Prophetic voice is using rhetoric to speak for a population. A dynamic spectacle has origins from the Aristotelian definition as "a weak hybrid form of drama, a theatrical concoction that relied upon external factors (shock, sensation, and passionate release) such as televised rituals of conflict and social control." Voice merging is a technique often used by African-American preachers. It combines the voices of previous preachers, excerpts from scriptures, and the speaker's own thoughts to create a unique voice. King uses voice merging in his peroration when he references the secular hymn "America". The rhetoric of the speech can be compared to the rhetoric of Old Testament prophets. During his speech, King speaks with urgency and crisis, giving him a prophetic voice. The prophetic voice must "restore a sense of duty and virtue amidst the decay of venality." A dynamic spectacle is dependent on the situation in which it is used. King's speech can be classified as a dynamic spectacle, given "the context of drama and tension in which it was situated", during the civil rights movement and the march. The speech has also been classified as apocalyptic rhetoric.

=== Similarities to other speakers' works ===
King is said to have used portions of SNCC activist Prathia Hall's speech at the site of Mount Olive Baptist, a burned-down African-American church in Terrell County, Georgia, in September 1962, in which she used the repeated phrase "I have a dream". The church was burned down after it was used for voter registration meetings.

The final passage from King's speech closely resembles Archibald Carey Jr.'s address to the 1952 Republican National Convention: both speeches end with a recitation of the first verse of "America", and the speeches share the name of one of several mountains from which both exhort "let freedom ring".

== Responses ==
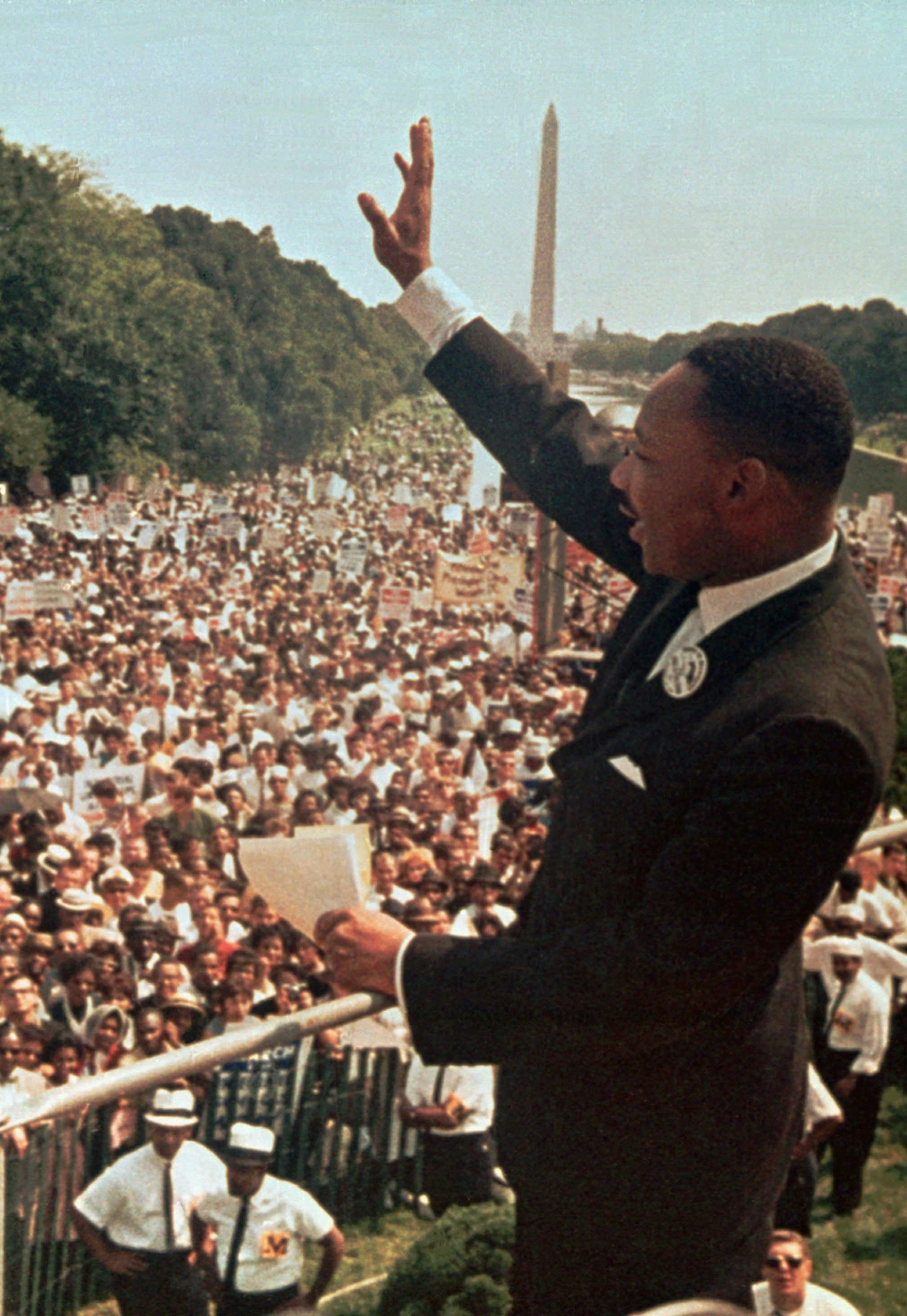
King waves to the crowd after the speech

The speech was lauded in the days after the event and was widely considered the high point of the March by contemporary observers. James Reston wrote for The New York Times:

Dr. King touched all the themes of the day, only better than anybody else. He was full of the symbolism of Lincoln and Gandhi, and the cadences of the Bible. He was both militant and sad, and he sent the crowd away feeling that the long journey had been worthwhile.

Reston also noted that the event "was better covered by television and the press than any event here since President Kennedy's inauguration", and opined that "it will be a long time before [Washington] forgets the melodious and melancholy voice of the Rev. Dr. Martin Luther King Jr. crying out his dreams to the multitude."

An article in The Boston Globe by Mary McGrory reported that King's speech "caught the mood" and "moved the crowd" of the day "as no other" speaker in the event. Marquis Childs of The Washington Post wrote that King's speech "rose above mere oratory". An article in the Los Angeles Times commented that the "matchless eloquence" displayed by King—"a supreme orator" of "a type so rare as almost to be forgotten in our age"—put to shame the advocates of segregation by inspiring the "conscience of America" with the justice of the civil-rights cause.

The Federal Bureau of Investigation (FBI), which viewed King and his allies for racial justice as subversive, also noticed the speech. This provoked the organization to expand their COINTELPRO operation against the Southern Christian Leadership Conference (SCLC), and to target King specifically as a major enemy of the United States. Two days after the speech, agent William C. Sullivan, the head of COINTELPRO, wrote a memo about King's growing influence:

Personally, I believe in the light of King's powerful demagogic speech yesterday, he stands head and shoulders above all other Negro leaders put together when it comes to influencing great masses of Negroes. We must mark him now, if we have not done so before, as the most dangerous Negro of the future in this Nation from the standpoint of communism, the Negro and national security.

You could feel "the passion of the people flowing up to him," James Baldwin, a skeptic of that day's March on Washington, later wrote, and in that moment, "it almost seemed that we stood on a height, and could see our inheritance; perhaps we could make the kingdom real."

— M. Kakutani, The New York Times

The speech was a success for the Kennedy administration and for the liberal civil rights coalition that had planned it. It was considered a "triumph of managed protest", and not one arrest relating to the demonstration occurred. Kennedy had watched King's speech on television and been very impressed. Afterward, March leaders accepted an invitation to the White House to meet with President Kennedy. Kennedy felt the March bolstered the chances for his civil rights bill.

Some Black leaders later criticized the speech (along with the rest of the march) as too compromising. Malcolm X wrote in his 1965 autobiography: "Who ever heard of angry revolutionaries swinging their bare feet together with their oppressor in lily pad pools, with gospels and guitars and 'I have a dream' speeches?"

== Legacy ==
Civil rights activist John Lewis, who spoke at the march as the president of the Student Nonviolent Coordinating Committee, later recalled:

Dr. King had the power, the ability, and the capacity to transform those steps on the Lincoln Memorial into a monumental area that will forever be recognized. By speaking the way he did, he educated, he inspired, he informed not just the people there, but people throughout America and unborn generations.

The March on Washington put pressure on the Kennedy administration to advance its civil rights legislation in Congress. The diaries of Arthur M. Schlesinger Jr., published posthumously in 2007, suggest that Kennedy was concerned that if the march failed to attract large numbers of demonstrators, it might undermine his civil rights efforts.

In the wake of the march, King was named Man of the Year by Time magazine for 1963, and in 1964, he was the youngest man ever awarded the Nobel Peace Prize. The full speech did not appear in writing until 1983, 15 years after King's death, when a transcript was published in The Washington Post.

In 1990, the band Doug Anthony All Stars sampled King's speech on their song "Shang-a-lang", on the album Icon. In 1992, the band Moodswings used excerpts of the speech on "Spiritual High, Part III" from the album Moodfood, and the band Extreme used parts of the Detroit speech on "Peacemaker Die" from the album III Sides to Every Story.

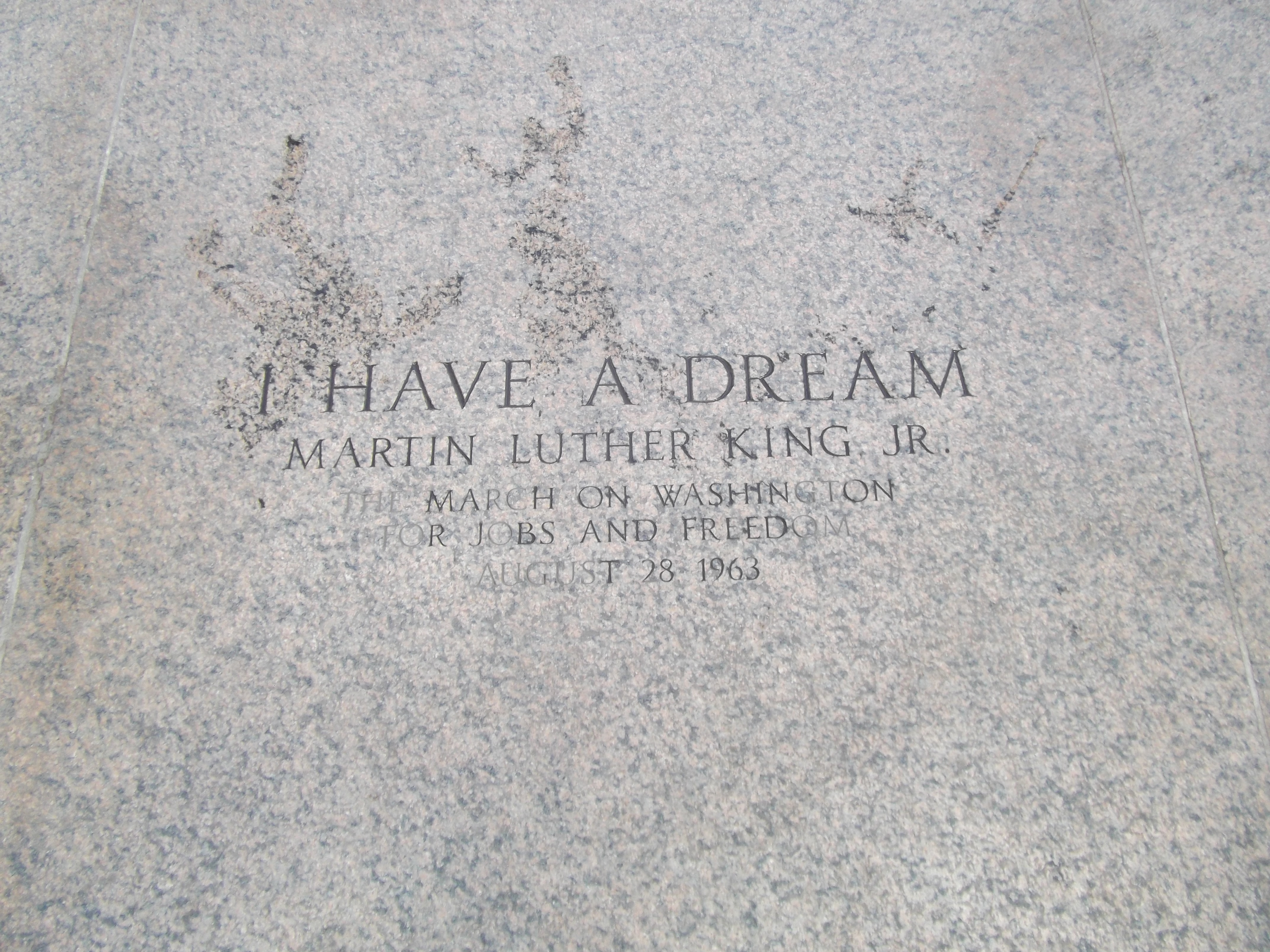
The location of King's speech on the steps of the Lincoln Memorial are commemorated with an inscription. (Note: I HAVE A DREAM MARTIN LUTHER KING JR. THE MARCH ON WASHINGTON FOR JOBS AND FREEDOM AUGUST 28 1963)

In 2002, the Library of Congress honored the speech by adding it to the National Recording Registry. In 2003, the National Park Service dedicated an inscribed marble pedestal to commemorate the location of King's speech at the Lincoln Memorial. Near the Potomac Basin in D.C., the Martin Luther King Jr. Memorial was dedicated in 2011. The centerpiece for the memorial is based on a line from the speech: "Out of a mountain of despair, a stone of hope." A 30-foot (9.1 m)-high relief sculpture of King named the Stone of Hope stands past two other large pieces of granite that symbolize the "mountain of despair" split in half.

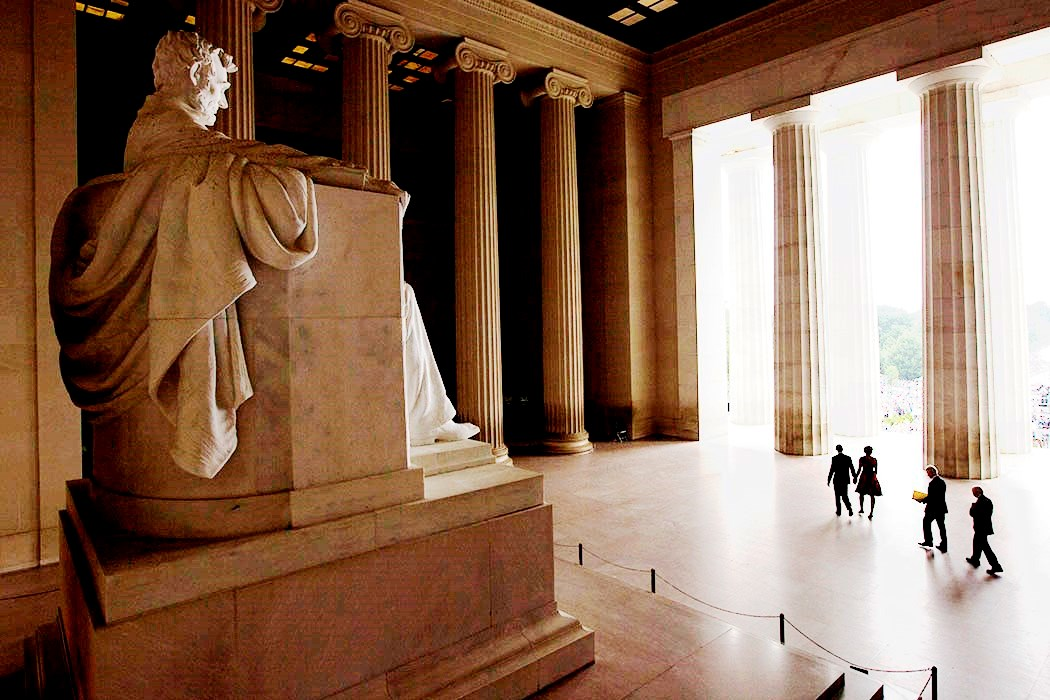
At the 2013 50th anniversary ceremony of the march, then-President Barack Obama, First Lady Michelle Obama, and former Presidents Jimmy Carter and Bill Clinton walk past Lincoln's statue

On August 28, 2013, thousands gathered on the National Mall in D.C. to commemorate the march's 50th anniversary at the Lincoln Memorial. In attendance were former US Presidents Bill Clinton and Jimmy Carter, and incumbent President Barack Obama, who addressed the crowd and spoke on the significance of the event. Many of King's family were in attendance.

In 2015, The Atlanta Journal-Constitution reported regarding Stone Mountain, then owned by the state of Georgia, that state officials were considering the installation of a new "Freedom Bell" honoring King and citing the speech's reference to the mountain "Let freedom ring from Stone Mountain of Georgia." In 2016, the speech was chosen to be added to a possible sequel to the Voyager Golden Record. Also that year, Treasury Secretary Jacob Lew announced that the US $5 bill, which has featured the Lincoln Memorial on its back, would undergo a redesign prior to 2020. Lew said that a portrait of Lincoln would remain on the front of the bill, but the back would be redesigned to depict various historical events that have occurred at the memorial, including an image from King's speech. In 2017, the statue of King on the grounds of the Georgia State Capitol was unveiled on the speech's 54th anniversary.

Ava DuVernay was commissioned by the Smithsonian's National Museum of African American History and Culture to create a film that debuted at the museum's opening in September 2016. The film, August 28: A Day in the Life of a People, tells of six significant events in African-American history that had happened on August 28, including the march.

In 2021, Time partnered with Epic Games to create an interactive exhibit dedicated to the speech within Epic's game Fortnite Creative on the 58th anniversary of the speech.

== Copyright dispute ==
Because King's speech was broadcast to a large radio and television audience, there was controversy about its copyright status. If the performance of the speech constituted "general publication", it would have entered the public domain due to King's failure to register the speech with the Register of Copyrights. But if the performance constituted only "limited publication", King retained common law copyright. This led to a lawsuit in 1999, Estate of Martin Luther King, Jr., Inc. v. CBS, Inc., which established that the King estate did hold copyright over the speech and had standing to sue; the parties then settled. Unlicensed use of the speech or a part of it can still be lawful in some circumstances, especially in jurisdictions under doctrines such as fair use or fair dealing. Under the applicable copyright laws, the speech will remain under copyright in the United States until 70 years after King's death, through 2038.

== Draft copy of the speech ==
On November 9, 2026, Christies announced that a draft of King’s speech had been "found in a desk drawer with other papers belonging to Edward T. Clayton, head of public relations for Dr. King's civil rights organization the Southern Christian Leadership Conference (SCLC) and a speechwriter and editor for Dr. King who assisted with the speech's composition." Xernona Clayton consigned the draft, to be auctioned on January 22, 2027, and the proceeds will benefit the Xernona Clayton Foundation and The King Center in Atlanta, Georgia.

== Original copy of the speech ==
As King waved goodbye to the audience, George Raveling, volunteering as a security guard at the event, asked King if he could have the original typewritten manuscript of the speech. Raveling, a star college basketball player for the Villanova Wildcats, was on the podium with King at that moment. King gave it to him. Raveling kept custody of the original copy, for which he had been offered $3 million, but he said had no intention to sell it. In 2021, he selected Villanova University, from where he graduated in 1960, to be the new steward of the speech. The document was loaned to the National Museum of African American History and Culture in Washington, D.C., as part of a long-term arrangement, where it is on rotational display.

== Chart performance ==
In the wake of King's assassination in 1968, the speech was issued as a single under Gordy Records and managed to crack onto the Billboard Hot 100, peaking at number 88.

== See also ==
- Bibliography of Martin Luther King Jr.
