= I'll Find My Way Home =

Single by Jon and Vangelis

from the album The Friends of Mr Cairo
- B-side: "Back to School"
- Released: November 1981
- Genre: Progressive pop; synth-pop
- Length: 4:29
- Label: Polydor
- Songwriters: Jon Anderson; Vangelis
- Producer: Vangelis

Jon and Vangelis singles chronology
"The Friends of Mr Cairo" (1981)	"I'll Find My Way Home" (1981)	"(I Want to Go) Back to School" (1981)

Official audio
- "I'll Find My Way Home" on YouTube

I'll Find My Way Home is a song written by Jon Anderson and Vangelis. It was included on the second edition of Jon and Vangelis' 1981 album The Friends of Mr Cairo.

The song was written after the initial release of The Friends of Mr Cairo, which commercially underperformed expectations set by the band. Following a dinner between the two, Vangelis informed Anderson of a chord sequence he was developing and invited Anderson over to finish it, which they accomplished over the span of three hours. It was issued as a single in November 1981 and reached the top ten in several European countries, including the UK Singles Chart. Upon the song's chart success, it was later appended to The Friends of Mr Cairo as the opening track.

== Release ==
In the United Kingdom, the single peaked at No. 6 and was certified Silver (1982) for sales of over 250,000 copies by BPI. It reached No. 51 on the Billboard Hot 100 and No. 41 on the Adult Contemporary chart. In Europe, it peaked at No. 1 in Switzerland and Poland, No. 2 in Ireland and the Netherlands, No. 3 in Belgium, No. 5 in Israel, No. 6 in West Germany, No. 9 in Sweden, No. 13 in France, and No. 19 in Austria. It also reached the top 50 in Australia. and New Zealand. In Canada, the song was issued in a picture sleeve with a song from The Friends of Mr Cairo titled "Beside" as the single's B-side.

Cashbox called the song a "dreamy duet featuring Vangelis' sparkling layers of keyboards and ex-Yes man Jon Anderson's floating falsetto" and that the song "ebbs and flows on a tide of glistening synthesizer waves."

=== Weekly charts ===
Chart (1981–82)	Peak position
Australia (Kent Music Report)	22
Austria (Ö3 Austria Top 40)	19
Belgium (Ultratop 50 Flanders)	3
France (IFOP)	49
Ireland (IRMA)	2
Israel (IBA)	5
Netherlands (Dutch Top 40)	4
Netherlands (Single Top 100)	2
New Zealand (Recorded Music NZ)	45
Sweden (Sverigetopplistan)	9
Switzerland (Schweizer Hitparade)	1
UK Singles (Official Charts)	6
US Billboard Hot 100	51
US Adult Contemporary (Billboard)	41
West Germany (GfK)	6

=== Year-end charts ===
Chart (1982)	Position
Australia (Kent Music Report)	52
Belgium (Ultratop Flanders)	22
Netherlands (Dutch Top 40)	29
Netherlands (Single Top 100)	23
Switzerland (Schweizer Hitparade)	2
West Germany (Official German Charts)	30

== Certifications ==
Region	Certification	Certified units/sales
United Kingdom (BPI)	Silver	250,000^{^}
^{^} Shipments figures based on certification alone.
