= I Hear You Now =

Single by Jon and Vangelis

from the album Short Stories
- B-side: "Thunder"
- Released: 28 December 1979
- Genre: Electronic
- Length: 5:13 (Album version); 4:12 (Single - long version); 3:37 (Single - short version)
- Label: Polydor
- Songwriters: Jon Anderson; Vangelis
- Producer: Vangelis

Jon and Vangelis singles chronology
"I Hear You Now" (1979)	"The Friends of Mr Cairo" (1981)

"I Hear You Now" is a song by Jon and Vangelis released in December 1979 and is their debut single from their first album Short Stories. It peaked at number eight on the UK Singles Charts, making it the duo's second biggest hit in that country.

== Use in other media ==
The song was featured prominently in the fifth episode of the Max Original Series Fired on Mars (2023).

== Track listing ==
1. "I Hear You Now" – 5:12
2. "Thunder" – 2:12

== Charts ==
=== Weekly charts ===
Chart (1980)	Peak position
Germany (GfK)	69
Belgium (Ultratop 50 Flanders)	3
France (IFOP)	53
Ireland (IRMA)	12
Netherlands (Dutch Top 40)	7
Netherlands (Single Top 100)	9
UK Singles (OCC)	8
US Billboard Hot 100	58

=== Year-end charts ===
Chart (1980)	Position
Belgium (Ultratop Flanders)	56
Netherlands (Dutch Top 40)	77
Netherlands (Single Top 100)	79
UK Singles (Official Charts Company)	100
