= Private Collection (Jon and Vangelis album) =

Studio album by Jon and Vangelis
- Released: May 1983
- Genre: Electronic music
- Length: 47:26
- Labels: Polydor, 813 174-1
- Producer: Vangelis

Jon and Vangelis chronology
The Friends of Mr Cairo (1981)	Private Collection (1983)	The Best of Jon and Vangelis (1984)

Professional ratings
Review scores
Source	Rating
Allmusic	4/5 stars

Private Collection is the third album released by Jon and Vangelis, released in May 1983 on Polydor Records.

== Track listing ==
All tracks composed by Jon Anderson and Vangelis

1. "Italian Song" (2:53)
2. "And When the Night Comes" (4:35)
3. "Deborah" (4:54)
4. "Polonaise" (5:24)
5. "He Is Sailing" (6:49)
6. "Horizon" (22:53)

== Personnel ==
- Jon Anderson – vocals
- Vangelis – keyboards, synthesisers, programming

with:

- Dick Morrissey – saxophone on "And When the Night Comes"

== Credits ==
- Music composed by Vangelis
- Lyrics written by Jon Anderson
- Arranged and produced by Vangelis

== Charts ==
Chart (1983)	Peak position
Australian Albums (Kent Music Report)	31
Austrian Albums (Ö3 Austria)	18
Canada Top Albums/CDs (RPM)	78
Dutch Albums (Album Top 100)	15
German Albums (Offizielle Top 100)	27
New Zealand Albums (RMNZ)	45
Swedish Albums (Sverigetopplistan)	24
UK Albums (Official Charts)	22
US Billboard 200	148
