= Short Stories (Jon and Vangelis album) =

Studio album by Jon and Vangelis
- Released: January 1980
- Recorded: February 1979 (original sessions), September–October 1979 (post-production)
- Studios: Nemo Studios (London, England)
- Genre: Electronic music
- Length: 45:16
- Label: Polydor
- Producer: Vangelis

Jon and Vangelis chronology
Short Stories (1980)	The Friends of Mr Cairo (1981)

Singles from Short Stories
- 1. "I Hear You Now" Released: December 1979

Short Stories is the debut album by Jon and Vangelis, the collaboration between Jon Anderson of the progressive rock band Yes and electronic music pioneer Vangelis. This was not the first time that the two had worked together: Vangelis had auditioned to be Rick Wakeman's replacement in Yes in 1974, but the role was given to Patrick Moraz. In 1975, Anderson sang on "So Long Ago So Clear" from Heaven and Hell.

== Background and composition ==
Putting overdubs aside, the cuts on Short Stories were all improvised one-take tape recordings tracked in 1979, with the album's working title Spont. [Spontaneous] Music based on this process. Vangelis said that the album may have taken a total of only two and a half non-consecutive weeks to produce, and "just four days to start with." Both Anderson and Vangelis wanted to work together just to have a fun time, the former explaining, "I won't say effortless, but the enjoyment of making music without prior conceptions, without deciding what it's going to be. Just do it." Sounds writer John Gill, who interviewed the pair for an article regarding how Short Stories was made, said that the two apparently wanted to make an album that would be out of the styles they had commonly been labeled under by both the press and consumers with past releases. Short Stories garners numerous elements of classical, pop, rock and folk.

== Critical reception ==
Professional ratings
Review scores
Source	Rating
AllMusic	1.5/5 stars
Record Mirror	4/5 stars
Smash Hits	3/10

Critical response to Short Stories, both upon release and in retrospect, has been mixed. A Smash Hits journalist put the blame entirely on Anderson for making the album "entirely unlistenable"; he jokingly described his lyrics as "the kind of 'cosmic' drivel that gets hippies a bad name", and felt that the "tuneless" melodies were written by just coming up with notes and pitches at random. Billboard Magazine observer said that Anderson's "clear voice" and his lyrics fit well with the structure of the compositions based on "swirling keyboard work". In a retrospective review, AllMusic reviewer Dave Connolly called the record "underwhelming", saying that it had very few "nearly memorable moments". He criticised it for being more focused on melody than making the arrangements less "amorphous" and "paper-thin", an issue also present on the last Yes album Anderson sang on before working on Short Stories, Tormato.

Gary Graff, who wrote a mixed review for The Beaver County Times, mainly criticised Vangelis' musical work on the record, feeling it was much more of a Vangelis album than a collaborative LP between him and Anderson, although superior to Vangelis's previous releases. He praised Anderson's vocal performance, calling it far better than how he sang on Tormato, but opined that his lyrics use word play and imagery that are inaccessible for average listeners. Graff also found the songs overlong, writing that listeners could lose interest in a track after only three minutes. He wrote that it would garner fans of the works of bands such as Pink Floyd and King Crimson but lose the interest of the Yes fan base.

In a more favourable reviews, The Sydney Morning Herald's Madeleine d'Haeye called Short Stories "an innovative, pleasing combination of two highly talented musicians exploring new horizons", highlighting Anderson's "beautiful clarity of tone" when singing high pitches and Vangelis's "finely matched" accompaniments. In 1982, R. S. Murthi reviewed the album for the New Straits Times as one of the "Aesthetes of electronics", spotlighting Anderson's "spirited energy" and Vangelis' skillful musical arrangements.

== Track listing ==
All music by Jon Anderson and Vangelis; all lyrics by Jon Anderson

=== Vinyl and cassette ===
1. "Curious Electric" 6:42
2. "Each and Everyday" 3:43
3. "Bird Song" 1:26
4. "I Hear You Now" 5:13
5. "The Road" 4:31
6. "Far Away in Baagad" 2:18
7. "Love Is" 5:46
8. "One More Time" 6:18
9. "Thunder" 2:14
10. "A Play Within a Play" 7:00

=== CD ===
The CD insert lists ten tracks as per the vinyl / cassette release, but the CD is actually divided into eight tracks as follows.

1. "Curious Electric" 6:42
2. "Each and Everyday / Bird Song" 5:08
3. "I Hear You Now" 5:13
4. "The Road" 4:31
5. "Far Away in Baagad / Love Is" 8:04
6. "One More Time" 6:18
7. "Thunder" 2:14
8. "A Play Within a Play" 7:00

== Personnel ==
- Jon Anderson - all vocals
- Vangelis - keyboards, drums, percussion, electronics
- Raphael Preston - acoustic guitars on "The Road"

Technical

- Raphael Preston - engineer
- Veronique Skawinska - photography

== Charts ==
=== Weekly charts ===
Chart (1980)	Peak position
Australian Albums (Kent Music Report)	65
Austrian Albums (Ö3 Austria)	18
Dutch Albums (Album Top 100)	1
French Albums (IFOP)	13
German Albums (Offizielle Top 100)	30
Norwegian Albums (VG-lista)	31
UK Albums (Official Charts)	4
US Billboard 200	125

=== Year-end Charts ===
Chart (1980)	Position
Dutch Albums (Album Top 100)	40

== Certifications ==
Region	Certification	Certified units/sales
Netherlands (NVPI)	Gold	50,000^{^}
United Kingdom (BPI)	Gold	100,000^{^}
^{^} Shipments figures based on certification alone.

== Production ==
- Produced and arranged By: Vangelis
- Engineer: Raphael Preston
- Mastering: Hitoshi Takiguchi
