= The Friends of Mr Cairo =

- Cover of second release

Studio album by Jon and Vangelis
- Released: 3 July 1981
- Studios: Davout Studios, Paris, and Nemo Studios, London
- Genres: Electronic; progressive rock
- Length: 45:42
- Label: Polydor
- Producer: Vangelis

Jon and Vangelis chronology
Short Stories (1980)	The Friends of Mr Cairo (1981)	Private Collection (1983)

Alternative cover
- Artwork on 1981 Polydor LP release

Singles from The Friends of Mr Cairo
- 1. "The Friends of Mr Cairo" Released: 22 May 1981; 2. "State of Independence" Released: 31 July 1981; 3. "I'll Find My Way Home" Released: November 1981

Professional ratings
Review scores
Source	Rating
Allmusic	3/5 stars

The Friends of Mr Cairo is the second album by Jon and Vangelis, released in July 1981.

A second edition of the album, released in January 1982, includes the single "I'll Find My Way Home", which according to Anderson was added in response to poor initial sales of the album, and which was a big hit across Europe at the time, peaking at No. 1 in Switzerland, No. 2 in The Netherlands and No. 6 in the UK.

"State of Independence" was later a hit single for Donna Summer, and a decade later for Moodswings with Chrissie Hynde on vocal. Anderson also re-recorded that song on his solo album Change We Must, released in 1994.

The album saw considerable success in Canada, reaching #2 for 3 weeks, and was #15 in the Best of 1981.

The title track, "The Friends of Mr Cairo", was No. 1 on the Canadian singles chart for 5 weeks in late 1981 and No. 10 on the Canadian AC charts for 2 weeks, The single also reached No. 99 in Australia for one week on 2 November 1981. Its accompanying music video serves as an ode to classic Hollywood films of the 1930s and 1940s, including references to the classic film noir The Maltese Falcon. Joel Cairo (Mr Cairo) is the character played by Peter Lorre in The Maltese Falcon. The track incorporates sound effects and voice impressions of the stars of the era, most notably Lorre, Humphrey Bogart, Sydney Greenstreet, and Jimmy Stewart. The title track includes the sounds of screeching car tyres. These were sampled from the audio track of the film Get Carter.

== Critical reception ==
Record Business referred to The Friends of Mr Cairo as "a potent second collaboration from two of rock's most imaginative artists. They highlighted the title track and "State of Independence" as "outstanding", highlighting the latter's "arresting rhythmic figures."

== Track listing ==
=== First edition ===
Side A

1. "The Friends of Mr Cairo" – 12:04
2. "Back to School" – 5:06
3. "Outside And Inside" – 5:00

Side B

4. "State of Independence" – 7:53
5. "Beside" – 4:08
6. "The Mayflower" – 6:35

=== Second edition ===
Side A

1. "I'll Find My Way Home" – 4:29
2. "State of Independence" – 7:53
3. "Beside" – 4:08
4. "The Mayflower" – 6:35

Side B

5. "The Friends of Mr Cairo" – 12:04
6. "Back to School" – 5:06
7. "Outside And Inside" – 5:00

=== CD ===
1. "I'll Find My Way Home" – 4:29
2. "State of Independence" – 7:53
3. "Beside" – 4:08
4. "The Mayflower" – 6:35
5. "The Friends of Mr. Cairo" – 12:04
6. "Back to School" – 5:06
7. "Outside of This (Inside of That)" – 5:00

== Personnel ==
- Jon Anderson – vocals, composer
- Vangelis – composer, producer, arranger, performer
- Dick Morrissey – saxophone, flute
- David Coker – voices
- Sally Grace – voices (5)
- Dennis Clarke - saxophone
- Claire Hamill – backing vocals (6)
- Carol Kenyon – backing vocals

Technical

- Roger Roche – engineer
- Raine Shine – engineer
- Alwyn Clayden – sleeve
- Veronique Skawinska – photography

== Charts ==
=== Weekly charts ===
Chart (1981–1982)	Peak position
Australian Albums (Kent Music Report)	9
Austrian Albums (Ö3 Austria)	8
Canada (RPM)	2
Dutch Albums (Album Top 100)	3
German Albums (Offizielle Top 100)	13
Swedish Albums (Sverigetopplistan)	35
UK Albums (Official Charts)	6
US Billboard 200	64

=== Year-end charts ===
Chart (1981)	Peak position
Canada (RPM) Top 100 Albums of 1981	15

Chart (1982)	Peak position
German Albums (Offizielle Top 100)	37

== Certifications ==
Region	Certification	Certified units/sales
Australia (ARIA)	Platinum	50,000^{^}
Canada (Music Canada)	Platinum	100,000^{^}
United Kingdom (BPI)	Gold	100,000^{^}
^{^} Shipments figures based on certification alone.
