= Jon and Vangelis =

Musical duo

- Jon Anderson and Vangelis, 1981

Background information
- Origin: Greece; United Kingdom
- Genres: Synth-pop; electronic; pop
- Years active: 1979–1991
- Labels: Polydor Records; Arista Records; Higher Octave Records
- Past members: Jon Anderson; Vangelis

Jon and Vangelis was a music collaboration between British rock singer Jon Anderson (lead vocalist of the progressive rock band Yes) and Greek synthesiser musician Vangelis. The duo released four albums between 1980 and 1991.

== History ==
In 1974, Vangelis was considered as a replacement for Rick Wakeman as keyboardist in Yes, and although the job went to Patrick Moraz, it led to several collaborations with Anderson, who contributed vocals to Vangelis' Heaven and Hell (1975) on the song "So Long Ago, So Clear", harp to Opera Sauvage (1979) on "Flamants Roses" and finally vocals to See You Later (1980) on "Suffocation" and "See You Later".

They recorded their first album together, Short Stories, in 1979, producing the major hit "I Hear You Now" as well as "One More Time". Anderson wrote the lyrics and Vangelis composed the music. In 1980, Anderson left Yes and released his second solo album, Song of Seven. Vangelis released his See You Later album the same year, with Anderson contributing vocals to two songs. The two reunited to record their second album, The Friends of Mr Cairo, in 1981, including the songs "Friends of Mr Cairo" and "State of Independence". Later pressings of the album included the UK top 10 hit "I'll Find My Way Home". In 1983, Anderson rejoined Yes and they released the album 90125. Jon and Vangelis released their own album, Private Collection, the same year.

In 1986, the duo made a few attempts at writing a new album, but much of this work was never officially released under the Jon and Vangelis name. Twelve tracks were compiled on 1991's Page of Life, while other songs from these sessions appeared in later works, including "Let's Pretend", the last song on the 1989 album Anderson Bruford Wakeman Howe. Anderson ultimately took it upon himself to rework Page of Life, which was released in 1998 in the United States only with nine tracks. In 2011, Anderson approached Vangelis for a possible new collaboration but he did not receive a reply.

Vangelis died on 17 May 2022.

== Discography ==
=== Albums ===
==== Studio albums ====
Title	Album details	Peak chart positions										Certifications
Title	Album details	UK	AUS	AUT	CAN	GER	NL	NZ	SPA	SWE	US	Certifications
Short Stories	Released: January 1980; Label: Polydor; Formats: LP, MC	4	65	18	—	30	1	—	—	—	125	NL: Gold; UK: Gold
The Friends of Mr Cairo	Released: 3 July 1981; Label: Polydor; Formats: LP, MC	6	9	8	2	13	3	—	—	35	64	AUS: Platinum; CAN: Platinum; UK: Gold
Private Collection	Released: May 1983; Label: Polydor; Formats: LP, MC	22	31	18	78	27	15	45	10	24	148	
Page of Life	Released: 9 September 1991; Label: Arista; Formats: CD, LP, MC; Re-released in 1998 with different tracks	—	—	—	—	—	37	—	—	—	—	
"—" denotes releases that did not chart or were not released in that territory.

==== Compilation albums ====
Title	Album details	Peak chart positions		
Title	Album details	UK	GER	NL
The Best of Jon and Vangelis	Released: 27 July 1984; Label: Polydor; Formats: CD, LP, MC	42	52	42
Chronicles	Released: 19 September 1994; Label: Spectrum Music; Formats: CD, MC	—	—	—
"—" denotes releases that did not chart or were not released in that territory.

=== Singles ===
Title	Year	Peak chart positions										Certifications	Album
Title	Year	UK	AUS	BE (FL)	CAN	GER	IRE	NL	SWI	SPA	US	Certifications	Album
"I Hear You Now"	1979	8	—	3	—	69	12	9	—	—	58		Short Stories
"One More Time" (Note: Released in the US)	1980	—	—	—	—	—	—	—	—	—	—		Short Stories
"The Friends of Mr Cairo"	1981	—	99	—	1	—	—	—	—	—	—	CAN: Gold	The Friends of Mr Cairo
"State of Independence"	1981	—	—	—	—	—	—	—	—	—	—		The Friends of Mr Cairo
"Back to School" (Note: Released in Canada)	1981	—	—	—	—	—	—	—	—	—	—		The Friends of Mr Cairo
"Outside of This" (Note: Released in the Netherlands)	1981	—	—	—	—	—	—	—	—	—	—		The Friends of Mr Cairo
"I'll Find My Way Home"	1981	6	22	3	—	6	2	2	1	—	51	UK: Silver	Non-album single (Note: included on the Second Edition of "The Friends of Mr Cairo")
"And When the Night Comes"	1983	87	—	—	—	—	—	—	—	—	—		Private Collection
"He Is Sailing"	1983	61	—	—	—	—	—	—	—	—	—		Private Collection
"Deborah" (Note: Released in Spain and Brazil)	1983	—	—	—	—	—	—	—	—	22	—		Private Collection
"Polonaise" (Note: Released in France)	1983	—	—	—	—	—	—	—	—	—	—		Private Collection
"State of Independence" (Note: Re-release)	1984	67	—	—	—	—	—	—	—	—	—		The Best of Jon and Vangelis
"Wisdom Chain"	1991	—	—	—	—	—	—	—	—	—	—		Page of Life
"—" denotes releases that did not chart or were not released in that territory.

=== Music videos ===
Year	Title	Album
1979	"I Hear You Now"	Short Stories
1981	"The Friends of Mr Cairo"	The Friends of Mr Cairo
