= Live at The Triple Door =

Live at The Triple Door may refer to:

- Live at The Triple Door (Skerik's Syncopated Taint Septet) by Skerik's Syncopated Taint Septet
- Live at The Triple Door (Noah Gundersen & the Courage album) by Noah Gundersen & the Courage
- Live albums of the same name by Greg Dulli, Layla Angulo, KEXP, Rough Dried, and several others.
