= List of Jon Anderson concert tours =

Yes lead singer Jon Anderson has performed solo shows since 1979 and solo tours since 1980.

== The 1970s ==
=== 1979 ===
Date	City	Country	Venue
Europe Spring-Summer 1979 Special Shows
1 May 1979	Glasgow	United Kingdom	Theatre Royal (Note: On 01 May 1979 in Glasgow, UK: Jon Anderson scheduled along with Ian Anderson, The Music of Duke Elington and Scottish Ballet.)
19 July 1979	Montreux	Switzerland	Montreux Jazz Festival (Note: On 19 July 1979 in Montreux, Switzerland: Yes members Jon Anderson / Steve Howe / Rick Wakeman special joint concert.)

== The 1980s ==
=== 1980: Song of Seven Tour ===
Typical setlist:

- "Olias of Sunhillow" excerpt (1976)
- "For You for Me" (1980)
- "Yes Medley Part 1" (including Intro, To Be Over (1974), Instrumental#1, The Prophet (1970), Long Distance Runaround (1971), Instrumental#2, Wonderous Stories (1977))
- Rejoice (1978)
- "Yes Medley Part 2" (including I've Seen All Good People (1971), The Revealing Science Of God (1973), I've Seen All Good People (1971) reprise, The Remembering (1973), Nous Sommes Du Soleil (1973))
- "Some Are Born" (1980)
- "Don't Forget (Nostalgia)" (1980)
- "Petrushka" (1911) (Igor Stravinsky)
- "Short Stories Medley" [a. "Far Away in Baagad" / b. "Bird Song" / c. "One More Time"] (1980) ("I Hear You Now" was played along with "One More Time" in Munich, West Germany)
- "Hear It" (1980)
- "Take Your Time" (1980)
- "Song of Seven" (1980)
- "Heart of the Matter" (1980) or "Tour Song"
- "Roundabout" (1971)

The New Life Band:

- Ronnie Leahy - Keyboards
- Chris Rainbow - Keyboards/percussion
- Barry de Souza - Drums
- John Giblin - Bass
- Joe Partridge - Guitars
- Morris Pert - Drums/percussion
- Les Davidson - Guitars
- Dick Morrissey - Sax/Flute

Date	City	Country	Venue
Europe
12 November 1980	Munich	West Germany	
United Kingdom (billed as "Jon Anderson with The New Life Band")
24 November 1980	Bristol	United Kingdom	Colston Hall
1 December 1980	London	United Kingdom	Royal Albert Hall
3 December 1980	Sheffield	United Kingdom	Sheffield City Hall
4 December 1980	Birmingham	United Kingdom	Birmingham Odeon
12 December 1980	Newcastle	United Kingdom	Newcastle City Hall
15 December 1980	Leicester	United Kingdom	De Montfort Hall
16 December 1980	Manchester	United Kingdom	Manchester Apollo

=== 1982: Animation Tour ===
Typical setlist:

- "Ocean Song" (1976) (Olias of Sunhillow opening; audio tape played through the PA system)
- "Sleight of Hand" (played at least one time on 30 July 1982 in Philadelphia) (Dave Sancious instrumental)
- "State of Independence" (1981)
- "Song of Seven" (1980) (Intro only) →
- "The Friends of Mr Cairo" (1981)
- "Instrumental#1"
- "Yes medley #1" (including Close to the Edge (1972), Heart of the Sunrise (1971), Wonderous Stories (1977), And You and I (1972), Long Distance Runaround (1971), Close to the Edge (1972) reprise)
- "Band introduction"
- "A Play and Display of the Heart" (1976) (Dave Sancious instrumental)
- "Animation" (1982)
- "Surrender" (1982)
- "All in a Matter of Time" (1982)
- "Dave Sancious keyboards solo" →
- "Soon" (1974)
- "Yes medley #2" (including Perpetual Change (1971), I've Seen All Good People (1971), Yours Is No Disgrace (1971), Starship Trooper (1971), Awaken (1977))
- "Instrumental#2" (Bass & drum solos → Animation jam)
- "Roundabout" (1971)
- "Olympia" (1982)

Date	City	Country	Venue
North America
2 July 1982	Long Beach, California	United States	Rumbleseat Garage
3 July 1982	Long Beach, California	United States	Rumbleseat Garage
5 July 1982	San Diego, California	United States	Old Globe Theater
12 July 1982	Vancouver, British Columbia	Canada	Commodore Ballroom
13 July 1982	Portland, Oregon	United States	The Euphoria
14 July 1982	Palo Alto, California	United States	The Keystone
15 July 1982	San Francisco, California	United States	The Old Waldorf
16 July 1982	Pasadena, California	United States	Perkins Palace
18 July 1982	Tempe, Arizona	United States	Dooley's
29 July 1982	Columbia, Maryland	United States	Merriweather Post Pavilion
30 July 1982	Philadelphia, Pennsylvania	United States	Mann Music Center
3 August 1982	Boston, Massachusetts	United States	The Metro
4 August 1982	New York City, New York	United States	The Palladium
5 August 1982	Pittsburgh, Pennsylvania	United States	Stanley Theater
6 August 1982	Asbury Park, New Jersey	United States	Asbury Park Convention Hall
7 August 1982	Hoffman Estates, Illinois	United States	Poplar Creek Music Theater
8 August 1982	Toronto, Ontario	Canada	O'Keefe Center
9 August 1982	Chelsea, Quebec	Canada	Camp Fortune
12 August 1982	Quebec City, Quebec	Canada	Grand Amphithéâtre Cegep Ste-Foy
13 August 1982	Montreal, Quebec	Canada	Verdun Auditorium
17 August 1982	Atlanta, Georgia	United States	Moonshadow Saloon
20 August 1982	Orlando, Florida	United States	Bob Carr Performing Arts Center
21 August 1982	Sunrise, Florida	United States	Sunrise Musical Theater
22 August 1982	Tampa, Florida	United States	Jai Alai Fronton Hall
25 August 1982	New Orleans, Louisiana	United States	Saenger Performing Arts Theater

=== 1986: One-off California show ===
Date	City	Country	Venue
North America Fall 1986: one-off California show (with Vangelis)
7 November 1986	Los Angeles	United States	Royce Hall

== The 1990s ==
=== 1992–1999 ===
Date	City	Country	Venue
Japan Summer 1992 Tour (with Kitarō)
3 June 1992	Tokyo	Japan	Budokan
North America Fall 1992 Tour (with Kitarō)
13 October 1992	Vancouver	Canada	Orpheum Theater
16 October 1992	Los Angeles	United States	Universal Amphitheatre
17 October 1992	Berkeley	United States	Greek Theater (Note: Mickey Hart was Special Guest at the Jon Anderson / Kitarō show on 17 October 1992 in Berkeley.)
21 October 1992	New York City	United States	Radio City Music Hall
22 October 1992	New York City	United States	Radio City Music Hall
North America Spring 1993 Tour
27 March 1993	Pasadena	United States	Raymond Theater
2 April 1993	Mexico City	Mexico	Auditorio Nacional
South America Spring 1993 Tour
4 April 1993	Heredia	Costa Rica	Palacio de los Deportes
13 April 1993	Santiago	Chile	Estadio Chile
14 April 1993	Caracas	Venezuela	Poliedro de Caracas
16 April 1993	San Juan de Puerto Rico	Puerto Rico	Luis Vigoreaux Theatre
17 April 1993	San Juan de Puerto Rico	Puerto Rico	Luis Vigoreaux Theatre
23 April 1993	Buenos Aires	Argentina	Estadio Obras Sanitarias
24 April 1993	Buenos Aires	Argentina	Estadio Obras Sanitarias
25 April 1993	Buenos Aires	Argentina	Teatro Gran Rex
8 May 1993	Lima	Peru	Carpa del Hotel Crillon
North America Fall 1993: California Show
14 October 1993	Los Angeles	United States	Bosnia benefit concert
North America 1996: Paso Robles Show
12 May 1996	Paso Robles	United States	("Mothers Day Concert")
North America 1999: Clearwater Show (with Alan White)
29 August 1999	Clearwater	United States	Coachman Park (Note: On 29 August 1999 in Clearwater, Jon Anderson & Alan White played the first time ever live performance of Yes' "Lightning Strikes" (1999).)

== The 2000s ==
=== 2000–2004: Brazil, North America & South America tours & shows ===
Date	City	Country	Venue
South America Fall 2000: Brazil Shows
16 November 2000	Rio de Janeiro	Brazil	British Rock Symphony 2000 concert
19 November 2000	Paulínia	Brazil	Parque Brasil 500
North America Winter 2004 Tour
9 January 2004	Atlantic City	United States	The Shell at Trump Marina
10 January 2004	Glenside	United States	Keswick Theatre
11 January 2004	Red Bank	United States	Count Basie Theatre
13 January 2004	Vienna	United States	The Barns at Wolf Trap
14 January 2004	Harrisburg	United States	Whitaker Center
17 January 2004	Tampa	United States	Ferguson Hall
18 January 2004	West Palm Beach	United States	Carefree Theater
19 January 2004	New York, NY	B.B King Blues Club	
South America Winter 2004 Tour
5 March 2004	Capital Federal, Buenos Aires	Argentina	Teatro Gran Rex
6 March 2004	Rosario, Santa Fe	Argentina	Teatro Broadway
14 March 2004	São Paulo	Brazil	Credicard Hall
15 March 2004	São Paulo	Brazil	Credicard Hall
North America Spring 2004 shows: XM Radio Studios + Cleveland
1 April 2004	Washington D.C.	United States	XM Radio Studios (Note: The recording of the 2004 XM Radio Studios show is available as the live DVD Tour of the Universe (2005).)
24 May 2004	Columbus???	United States	Ohio State University???
25 May 2004	Cleveland	United States	Waetjen Auditorium (Note: On May 25, 2004 in Cleveland, Ohio, Jon Anderson performed with the Contemporary Youth Orchestra.)

=== 2005–2006: Tour of the Universe ===
Date	City	Country	Venue
Europe
1 September 2005	Tel Aviv	Israel	Hangar 11
2 September 2005	Istanbul	Turkey	New Angel
5 September 2005	Bucharest	Romania	Radio Hall
7 September 2005	Budapest	Hungary	Petofi Hall
9 September 2005	Zabrze	Poland	House of Music and Dance
11 September 2005	Sopot	Poland	Forest Opera
12 September 2005	Stockholm	Sweden	Cirkus
13 September 2005	Gothenburg	Sweden	Gothenburg Concert Hall
14 September 2005	Helsinki	Finland	Tapiola Cultural Center
16 September 2005	Oslo	Norway	Rockefeller Music Hall
17 September 2005	Malmö	Sweden	Palladium
18 September 2005	Copenhagen	Denmark	Amager Bio
20 September 2005	Prague	Czech Republic	Broadway Theater
21 September 2005	Mainz	Germany	Phoenix Hall
22 September 2005	Stuttgart	Germany	Theater House
23 September 2005	Milan	Italy	Giuseppe Verdi Conservatory
24 September 2005	Lisbon	Portugal	Great Hall
28 September 2005	Barcelona	Spain	The Gas Light
30 September 2005	Malaga	Spain	Cervantes Theater
3 October 2005	Paris	France	Paris Casino
4 October 2005	Brussels	Belgium	Royal Circus
5 October 2005	Tilburg	Netherlands	Popcenter 013
7 October 2005	Birmingham	United Kingdom	Birmingham Symphony Hall
8 October 2005	York	United Kingdom	Grand Opera House
10 October 2005	London	United Kingdom	O2 Shepherd's Bush Empire
11 October 2005	Manchester	United Kingdom	Bridgewater Hall
12 October 2005	Newcastle	United Kingdom	Newcastle City Hall
14 October 2005	Edinburgh	United Kingdom	Queen's Hall
15 October 2005	Edinburgh	United Kingdom	Queen's Hall
16 October 2005	Reykjavík	Iceland	Haskolabio
North America
2 November 2005	Annapolis	United States	Ram's Head On Stage
4 November 2005	Annapolis	United States	Ram's Head On Stage
5 November 2005	Hartford	United States	Webster Theater
6 November 2005	Boston	United States	Avalon Ballroom
8 November 2005	Verona	United States	Turning Stone Resort and Casino
10 November 2005	Alexandria	United States	The Birchmere
11 November 2005	Atlantic City	United States	House of Blues
12 November 2005	Philadelphia	United States	The Theatre of Living Arts
13 November 2005	Philadelphia	United States	The Theatre of Living Arts
15 November 2005	New York City	United States	B.B. King Blues Club and Grill
17 November 2005	Westbury	United States	Westbury Music Fair
18 November 2005	Red Bank	United States	Count Basie Theatre
20 November 2005	Royal Oak	United States	Royal Oak Music Theatre
21 November 2005	Indianapolis	United States	Indianapolis Music Hall
23 November 2005	Chicago	United States	House of Blues
North America
27 March 2006	Seattle	United States	Benaroya Hall
28 March 2006	Portland	United States	Aladdin Theatre
30 March 2006	Santa Barbara	United States	SOhO Music Club
31 March 2006	Los Angeles	United States	The Roxy Theatre
Asia
17 April 2006	Tokyo	Japan	Tokyo International Forum
20 April 2006	Nagoya	Japan	Club Quattro
21 April 2006	Osaka	Japan	Club Quattro
24 April 2006	Singapore	Singapore	Esplanade on the Bay

=== 2006: Anderson / Wakeman tour ===
Date	City	Country	Venue
United Kingdom Fall 2006 Tour (with Rick Wakeman) (billed as "Anderson / Wakeman")
3 October 2006	Folkestone	United Kingdom	Leas Cliff Hall
5 October 2006	Doncaster	United Kingdom	The Dome
6 October 2006	Glasgow	United Kingdom	Armadillo
7 October 2006	Edinburgh	United Kingdom	Playhouse Theatre
8 October 2006	Dundee	United Kingdom	Caird Hall
10 October 2006	Tunbridge Wells	United Kingdom	Assembly Rooms
11 October 2006	Basingstoke	United Kingdom	The Anvil
12 October 2006	Northampton	United Kingdom	Derngate
14 October 2006	Buxton	United Kingdom	Opera House
16 October 2006	Croydon	United Kingdom	Fairfield Halls
17 October 2006	Cardiff	United Kingdom	St David's Hall
18 October 2006	Portsmouth	United Kingdom	Guildhall
20 October 2006	Cambridge	United Kingdom	Corn Exchange
22 October 2006	Ipswich	United Kingdom	Regents Theatre
24 October 2006	Southend-on-Sea	United Kingdom	Cliffs Pavilion
25 October 2006	Wolverhampton	United Kingdom	Bilston Robin
28 October 2006	Bristol	United Kingdom	Colston Hall
30 October 2006	Manchester	United Kingdom	Palace Theatre
31 October 2006	High Wycombe	United Kingdom	Wycombe Swan
1 November 2006	Sheffield	United Kingdom	City Hall

=== 2007–2009: North America & Europe tours & shows ===
Date	City	Country	Venue
North America Winter 2007 Tour
15 February 2007	Glenside	United States	Keswick Theatre (Note: With the Paul Green School of Rock Allstars)
16 February 2007	Ridgefield	United States	The Ridgefield Playhouse (Note: With the Paul Green School of Rock Allstars)
18 February 2007	New York City	United States	B.B. King Blues Club & Grill (Note: With the Paul Green School of Rock Allstars)
19 February 2007	Fairfield	United States	Fairfield Theatre Company (2 shows) (Note: With the Paul Green School of Rock Allstars)
8 March 2007	Millvale	United States	Mr. Small's Theatre (Note: With the Paul Green School of Rock Allstars)
Netherlands Spring 2007 Show
24 March 2007	Tilburg	Netherlands	Poppodium 013 - Dommelsch Zaal
North America Spring 2007 Tour
20 April 2007	New York City	United States	Green Apple Music Festival - Grand Central Terminal (Note: With the Paul Green School of Rock Allstars)
21 April 2007	Sayreville	United States	Starland Ballroom (Note: With the Paul Green School of Rock Allstars)
24 April 2007	Falls Church	United States	State Theatre
Europe Fall 2007 Tour
11 November 2007	Ghent	Belgium	Handelsbeurs
12 November 2007	Verviers	Belgium	Spirit of 66
14 November 2007	Sofia	Bulgaria	Universiada Hall
15 November 2007	Budapest	Hungary	Petofi Hall (Petőfi Csarnok)
18 November 2007	Västerås	Sweden	The Concert House (Sigurdsgatan 25)
20 November 2007	Saint Petersburg	Russia	Capella
21 November 2007	Moscow	Russia	B-2
22 November 2007	Moscow	Russia	(Private Corporate Event)
24 November 2007	Madrid	Spain	Sala Copernico
25 November 2007	Barcelona	Spain	Luz de Gas
28 November 2007	Milan	Italy	Trezzo
29 November 2007	Costabissara	Italy	Auditorium MaxLive
1 December 2007	Drachten	Netherlands	The Iduna
2 December 2007	Zoetermeer	Netherlands	De Boerderij
3 December 2007	Amsterdam	Netherlands	Melkweg (old hall)
5 December 2007	Bonn	Germany	Bruecken Forum
6 December 2007	Mainz	Germany	Frankfurter Hof
North America Winter-Spring 2008 Tour
20 February 2008	Anaheim	United States	House of Blues
23 February 2008	Las Vegas	United States	House of Blues
3 March 2008	New York City	United States	(unknown venue)
4 March 2008	Philadelphia	United States	Trocadero Theatre
5 March 2008	New York City	United States	B.B. King Blues Club and Grill
7 March 2008	Rochester	United States	Water Street Music Hall (Note: With the Paul Green School of Rock Allstars)
10 March 2008	New York City	United States	Highline Ballroom (Note: With the School of Rock Allstars)
29 March 2008	Toronto	Canada	Danforth Music Hall
8 April 2008	San Jan Capistrano	United States	The Coach House
9 April 2008	West Hollywood	United States	The Roxy Theatre (Note: With the Paul Green School of Rock Allstars)
10 April 2008	Agoura Hills	United States	Canyon Club
United States Summer 2009: California Show
6 June 2009	Grover Beach	United States	Mongo's Saloon

=== 2009: Have Guitar Will Travel tour ===
Date	City	Country	Venue
Europe Summer 2009 Tour (billed as "Have Guitar Will Travel")
30 June 2009	Warsaw	Poland	Teatr Muzyczny Roma (Theatre Roma)
3 July 2009	Bilston	United Kingdom	The Robin 2
11 July 2009	Ostrava	Czech Republic	Colours of Ostrava Festival - Ostrava City Center
14 July 2009	Sorrento	Italy	Parco Enrico Ibsen
16 July 2009	Rome	Italy	Roma Incontra il Mondo Festival - Laghetto di Villa Ada
25 July 2009	Southend-On-Sea	United Kingdom	The Palace Theatre
1 August 2009	Northampton	United Kingdom	The Royal & Derngate Theatre
2 August 2009	Liverpool	United Kingdom	Philharmonic Hall
15 August 2009	Bratislava	Slovak Republic	Castle Devin (Note: The Jon Anderson show on 15 August 2009 in Bratislava, Slovak Republic was entitled "Tribute To Freedom" concert and was free admission.)

=== 2009: North America tours ===
Date	City	Country	Venue
North America Fall 2009 Shows
3 November 2009	Winnipeg	Canada	Silverados
7 November 2009	Edmonton	Canada	Century Casino Showroom
15 November 2009	Santa Barbara	United States	SOHO Restaurant & Music Club

== The 2010s ==
=== 2010–2013 ===
Date	City	Country	Venue
North America Spring 2010 Tour
24 March 2010	Vancouver, British Columbia	Canada	Vogue Theater
27 March 2010	North Bay, Ontario	Canada	Capitol Centre
31 March 2010	Toronto, Ontario	Canada	Danforth Music Hall
3 April 2010	Hamilton, Ontario	Canada	The Studio
7 April 2010	Foxborough, Massachusetts	United States	Showcase Live
11 April 2010	New York City, New York	United States	B.B. King Blues Club & Grill
13 April 2010	Philadelphia, Pennsylvania	United States	Theater of the Living Arts
21 May 2010	Cleveland, Ohio	United States	Foster Theatre (Note: Part of the Rock and Roll Hall of Fame "Legends Series". Also included an interview and Q&A.)
24 May 2010	Cleveland, Ohio	United States	Severance Hall (Note: On May 24, 2010 in Cleveland, Ohio, Jon Anderson performed again with the Contemporary Youth Orchestra. This performance was filmed by AXSTV.)
North America Summer 2010 Tour (billed as "An Acoustic Evening with Jon Anderson (The Voice of Yes"))
16 August 2010	Minneapolis	United States	Guthrie Theatre
19 August 2010	Chicago	United States	Park West
21 August 2010	Milwaukee	United States	Milwaukee County Zoo
23 August 2010	Ferndale	United States	Magic Bag
25 August 2010	Millvale	United States	Mr. Small's Theatre
27 August 2010	Niagara Falls	United States	Bears Den at Seneca Niagara Casino & Hotel
29 August 2010	Ridgefield	United States	Ridgefield Playhouse
1 September 2010	Alexandria	United States	Birchmere
4 September 2010	Easton	United States	"A Conversation with Jon Anderson" - The Avalon Theatre at The Stoltz Listening Room
5 September 2010	Easton	United States	"A Conversation with Jon Anderson" - The Avalon Theatre at The Stoltz Listening Room
8 September 2010	Sellersville	United States	Sellersville Theatre
10 September 2010	Greensboro	United States	Carolina Theatre
12 September 2010	Atlanta	United States	Variety Playhouse
14 September 2010	Austin	United States	Paramount Theatre
16 September 2010	Dallas	United States	Lakewood Theatre
Finland Fall 2010 Show (billed as "An Acoustic Evening with Jon Anderson (The Voice of Yes"))
29 September 2010	Helsinki	Finland	Old Student House (Vanha Ylioppilastalo)
United Kingdom Fall 2010 Tour (with Rick Wakeman) (billed as "The Anderson Wakeman Project 360")
8 October 2010	Addlestone	United Kingdom	Turks Hall (Note: Special preview show.)
9 October 2010	Cambridge	United Kingdom	Corn Exchange
11 October 2010	Crawley	United Kingdom	The Hawth
12 October 2010	Croydon	United Kingdom	Fairfield Halls
~~14 October 2010~~	~~Ipswich~~	United Kingdom	~~The Corn Exchange - Grand Hall~~
15 October 2010	Stevenage	United Kingdom	Arts & Leisure Centre
16 October 2010	Tunbridge Wells	United Kingdom	Assembly Halls Theatre
19 October 2010	Liverpool	United Kingdom	Philharmonic Hall
21 October 2010	Wolverhampton	United Kingdom	Civic Hall
22 October 2010	Basingstoke	United Kingdom	The Anvil
24 October 2010	Leeds	United Kingdom	Grand Theatre
25 October 2010	Buxton	United Kingdom	Opera House
29 October 2010	Poole	United Kingdom	Lighthouse
30 October 2010	St Albans	United Kingdom	Alban Arena
1 November 2010	Bristol	United Kingdom	Colston Hall
2 November 2010	Southend	United Kingdom	Cliffs Pavilion
6 November 2010	Edinburgh	United Kingdom	Playhouse
7 November 2010	Perth	United Kingdom	Concert Hall
8 November 2010	Gateshead	United Kingdom	The Sage
11 November 2010	Manchester	United Kingdom	Palace Theatre
12 November 2010	Ipswich	United Kingdom	The Corn Exchange - Grand Hall
15 November 2010	London	United Kingdom	indigo2 at the O2
North America Fall 2010 Tour
1 December 2010	Los Angeles	United States	Orpheum Theatre
3 December 2010	Pala	United States	Pala Casino
8 December 2010	Santa Barbara	United States	Lobero Theatre
6 December 2010	San Luis Obispo	United States	Spanos Theatre, Performing Arts Center
10 December 2010	Henderson	United States	Ovation At Green Valley Ranch
12 December 2010	San Francisco	United States	The Regency Ballroom
North America Winter 2011 Shows
25 February 2011	Aspen	United States	Wheeler Opera House
14 March 2011	San Antonio, TX	United States	The Majestic Theater (Note: With the YOSA (Youth Orchestras of San Antonio).)
North America Spring 2011 Tour (billed as "An Acoustic Evening with Jon Anderson")
23 April 2011	Somerville, Massachusetts	United States	Somerville Theatre
26 April 2011	New Hope, Pennsylvania	United States	Havana
28 April 2011	Norfolk, Connecticut	United States	Infinity Hall
30 April 2011	New York City, New York	United States	B.B. King Blues Club & Grill
2 May 2011	Bethlehem, Pennsylvania	United States	ArtsQuest Center at Steel Stacks
4 May 2011	Philadelphia, Pennsylvania	United States	Theatre of Living Arts
6 May 2011	Princeton, New Jersey	United States	McCarter Theatre
7 May 2011	Newark, New Jersey	United States	Victoria Theater (Note: On 7 May 2011 in Newark, Julia Barry is opening for Jon Anderson.)
9 May 2011	Annapolis, Maryland	United States	Rams Head On Stage
11 May 2011	Annapolis, Maryland	United States	Rams Head On Stage
13 May 2011	Plymouth, New Hampshire	United States	Flying Monkey Movie House & Performing Center
15 May 2011	Lewiston, Maine	United States	Olin Arts Center Concert Hall
18 May 2011	Londonderry, New Hampshire	United States	Tupelo Music Hall
19 May 2011	Londonderry, New Hampshire	United States	Tupelo Music Hall
21 May 2011	Woodstock, Vermont	United States	Woodstock Town Hall Theatre
25 May 2011	Ellsworth, Maine	United States	Ellsworth Grand Auditorium
North America Summer 2011 Tour
9 July 2011	Courtenay	Canada	MusicFest - Courtenay Exhibition Grounds
10 July 2011	Courtenay	Canada	MusicFest - Courtenay Exhibition Grounds
12 July 2011	Seattle	United States	The Triple Door
14 July 2011	Portland	United States	Aladdin Theater
31 July 2011	Vernon	Canada	Komasket Music Festival - Komasket Park
3 August 2011	Lincolnshire	United States	Viper Alley
5 August 2011	St. Charles	United States	Arcada Theatre
7 August 2011	Ancaster (Note: The show on 7 August 2011 in Ancaster, Ontario was sometimes announced in Jerseyville.)	Canada	Festival of Friends - Ancaster Fairgrounds
11 August 2011	Shirley	United States	Bull Run Restaurant
North America Fall 2011 Tour with Rick Wakeman (billed as "Anderson / Wakeman")
19 October 2011	Milwaukee	United States	Potawatomi Casino - Northern Lights Theater
22 October 2011	Munhall	United States	Carnegie Library - Music Hall of Homestead
23 October 2011	Washington, D.C.	United States	George Washington University - Lisner Auditorium
24 October 2011	New York City	United States	New York Society for Ethical Culture - The Concert Hall
26 October 2011	Buffalo	United States	Kleinhans Music Hall
27 October 2011	Albany	United States	The Palace Theatre
29 October 2011	Atlantic City	United States	Tropicana Casino Resort
30 October 2011	Philadelphia	United States	Temple University - Temple Performing Arts Center
1 November 2011	Concord	United States	Capitol Center for the Arts
2 November 2011	Ridgefield	United States	The Ridgefield Playhouse
4 November 2011	Red Bank	United States	Count Basie Theatre
5 November 2011	Stroudsburg	United States	Sherman Theatre
6 November 2011	Westbury	United States	Theatre at Westbury
8 November 2011	Worcester	United States	Hanover Theatre
10 November 2011	Quebec City	Canada	Grand Théâtre du Québec
12 November 2011	Montreal	Canada	St. Denis Theatre
25 November 2011	Mexico City	Mexico	Riviera Maya Jazz Festival - Mamitas Beach Club, Playa del Carmen
South America Winter 2011 Tour
7 December 2011	Santiago	Chile	Teatro Oriente
3 December 2011	Florianópolis	Brazil	Floripa Music Hall
9 December 2011	Porto Alegre	Brazil	Teatro do Bourbon Country
10 December 2011	Goiânia	Brazil	Bolshoi Pub
13 December 2011	São Paulo	Brazil	Citibank Hall SP
North America Winter 2012 Tour
2 February 2012	Mesa	United States	Mesa Arts Center
4 February 2012	Mesa	United States	Mesa Arts Center
17 February 2012	Lancaster	United States	American Music Theatre
19 February 2012	Newton	United States	Newton Theater
24 February 2012	Las Vegas	United States	The Blue Man Theatre
26 February 2012	Austin	United States	One World Theatre
28 February 2012	Dallas	United States	Kessler Theater (Note: On 28 February 2012 in Dallas, Tim DeLaughter is opening for Jon Anderson.)
1 March 2012	Durham	United States	Carolina Theatre - Fletcher Hall
3 March 2012	Hamilton	United States	Parrish Auditorium
5 March 2012	Wilmington	United States	World Café Live at The Queen
7 March 2012	Philadelphia	United States	Theater of the Living Arts
8 March 2012	Baltimore	United States	Baltimore Sound Stage
10 March 2012	New York City	United States	B.B. King Blues Club and Grill
11 March 2012	Washington, D.C.	United States	The Hamilton Live
14 March 2012	Norfolk	United States	Infinity Hall
15 March 2012	Boston	United States	The Wilbur Theatre
19 March 2012	Englewood	United States	Bergen Performing Arts Center
North America Spring-Summer 2012 Tour
1 June 2012	Minneapolis	United States	Dakota Jazz Club & Restaurant
3 June 2012	Milwaukee	United States	Pabst Theatre
6 June 2012	Chicago	United States	Mayne Stage
8 June 2012	Lincolnshire	United States	Viper Alley
11 June 2012	Seattle	United States	The Triple Door
12 June 2012	Seattle	United States	The Triple Door
16 June 2012	Napa	United States	Napa Valley Opera House
19 June 2012	Livermore	United States	Livermore Valley Performing Arts Center
21 June 2012	Santa Cruz	United States	Rio Theatre
30 June 2012	Templeton	United States	Castoro Cellars
6 July 2012	San Jan Capistrano	United States	The Coach House
7 July 2012	Agoura Hills	The Canyon Club	
Europe Summer 2012: UK Show
8 August 2012	London	United Kingdom	Sadler's Wells
South America Summer-Fall 2012 Tour
11 September 2012	Montevideo	Uruguay	Auditorio Nacional Adela Reta
14 September 2012	Curitiba	Brazil	Teatro Positivo
17 September 2012	Recife	Brazil	Parque Dona Lindu
19 September 2012	Salvador	Brazil	Teatro Castro Alves
21 September 2012	Rio de Janeiro	Brazil	Centro Cultural Joao Nogueira
22 September 2012	Santana de Parnaíba	Brazil	Skyline Alphaville
26 September 2012	Belo Horizonte	Brazil	Grande Teatro do Palácio das Artes
28 September 2012	Buenos Aires	Argentina	ND/Teatro
30 September 2012	Mar del Plata	Argentina	Teatro Auditorium
3 October 2012	Tucuman	Argentina	Teatro San Martin
5 October 2012	Cordoba	Argentina	Teatro Luz y Fuerza
7 October 2012	Mendoza	Argentina	Teatro Plaza
10 October 2012	Rosario	Argentina	Teatro El Circulo
North America Fall 2012: Texas & California Shows
2 November 2012	Austin	United States	One World Theatre
5 November 2012	Los Angeles	United States	The GRAMMY Museum
Australia & New Zealand Spring 2013 Tour
28 March 2013	Brisbane	Australia	Brisbane Powerhouse
30 March 2013	Byron Bay	Australia	Bluesfest - Tyagarah Tea Tree Farm
31 March 2013	Byron Bay	Australia	Bluesfest - Tyagarah Tea Tree Farm
3 April 2013	Newcastle	Australia	Lizottes
6 April 2013	Marrickville	Australia	The Factory Theatre
10 April 2013	Melbourne	Australia	The Corner Hotel
11 April 2013	Melbourne	Australia	The Corner Hotel
14 April 2013	Adelaide	Australia	The Gov
~~17 April 2013~~	~~Auckland~~	~~New Zealand~~	~~The SkyCity Theatre~~; CANCELLED!
~~20 April 2013~~	~~Wellington~~	~~New Zealand~~	~~The St James Theatre~~; CANCELLED!
North America Spring 2013: Canada Show
25 May 2013	Rouyn-Noranda	Canada	9th Festival des guitares du monde en Abitibi-Témiscamingue (FGMAT) - Centre de congrès
Europe Summer 2013 Tour
4 August 2013	Manchester	United Kingdom	Royal Exchange Theatre
10 August 2013	Fulham	United Kingdom	Under the Bridge
12 August 2013	Helsinki	Finland	Savoy-teatteri
15 August 2013	Gothenburg	Sweden	Liseberg Amusement Park - Taube Stage
United States Fall 2013: Nevada & Florida Shows
21 September 2013	Las Vegas	United States	Raiding The Rock Vault show - LVH Theater (Las Vegas Hotel & Casino)
10 November 2013	Miami Beach	United States	Colony Theatre; 2 shows (6.30pm & 9.30pm)
Europe Fall 2013: Iceland Show
15 November 2013 (Note: Jon was backed with Icelandic pop/rock band Todmobile.)	Reykjavík	Iceland	Harpa - Eldborg

=== 2014 ===
"Acoustic Evening 2014" Tour typical setlist (except for the Clearwater show opening for Alan Parsons Project, the "Progressive Nation At Sea 2014" Cruise show and the Anderson Ponty Band's debut show on 20 September 2014 at the Wheeler Opera House in Aspen, Colorado, United States):

- "Open" excerpt ("Sun Is Calling") (2011) →
- "Yours Is No Disgrace" (1971)
- "Sweet Dreams" (1970)
- "America" (1968) (Paul Simon)
- "Time and a Word" (1970) (quoting She Loves You (1963) (Lennon/McCartney))
- "One Love" (1977) (Bob Marley / Curtis Mayfield)
- "Under Heaven's Door" (2010) (also known as "Never")
- "To the Runner" (1976) (Olias of Sunhillow excerpt) (presumably dropped from the set after the 26 February 2014 show in Dallas, TX)
- "Flight Of The Moorglade" (1976) (Olias of Sunhillow excerpt) (presumably added to the set starting from the 14 March 2014 show in Aspen, Co)
- "I'll Find My Way Home" (1981)
- "Open" excerpt ("Please To Remember") (2011) →
- "Starship Trooper" (1971)
- "Long Distance Runaround" (1971)
- "Give Love Each Day" (2001)
- "Owner of a Lonely Heart" (1983)
- "Solo / Yes Piano Medley" (including "Set Sail" (2006), "Close To The Edge" (1972), "Heart Of The Sunrise" (1971), "Marry Me Again", "The Revealing Science of God (Dance of the Dawn)" (excerpt) (1973))
- "You Got The Light" (not yet published)
- "And You And I" (1972)
- "The Ancient (Giants Under the Sun)" ("Leaves Of Green" excerpt) (1973)
- "Ritual (Nous sommes du soleil)" (excerpt) (1973) (presumably added to the set starting from the 14 March 2014 show in Aspen, Co)
- "Tony and Me" (not yet published)
- "A Day In The Life" (1967) (Lennon / McCartney) (presumably added to the set starting from the 14 March 2014 show in Aspen, Co; sometimes played between "Give Love Each Day" and "Owner Of A Lonely Heart" as on 13 April 2014 in Ridgefield, CT)
- "Turn of the Century" (1977) (presumably added to the set starting from the 14 March 2014 show in Aspen, Co)
- "I've Seen All Good People" (1971) (quoting Give Peace A Chance (1969) (John Lennon))
- "Roundabout" (1971)
- "Open" excerpt ("Sun Is Calling" reprise) (2011) →
- "State Of Independence" (1980)
- "Wonderous Stories" (1977)
- "Soon" ("The Gates of Delirium" closing section) (1974)

Clearwater 2014 show setlist (opening for Alan Parsons Project):

- "State of Independence" (1981)
- "Open" (2011) →
- "Starship Trooper" (1971)
- "Long Distance Runaround" (1971)
- "Earth and Peace"
- "Owner Of A Lonely Heart" (1983)
- "And You And I" (1972)
- "Change We Must" (1991/1994)
- "I've Seen All Good People" (1971) (quoting Give Peace A Chance (1969) (John Lennon))
- "Roundabout" (1971)

"Progressive Nation At Sea 2014" Cruise show setlist:

Backed by Transatlantic, Jon performed only a (50-minute) 4-track show :

- "The Revealing Science of God" (1973)
- "Long Distance Runaround" (1971)
- "And You And I" (1972)
- "Starship Trooper" (1971)

"Anderson Ponty Band's (20 September 2014) debut show" setlist:

Part 1:

- "Intro" →
- "One In The Rhythm of Hope" (2015)
- "A for Aria" (2015)
- "Yours Is No Disgrace" (1971/not yet published)
- "Listening With Me" (2015)
- "Time and A Word" (1970/2015)
- "Jig" (not yet published)
- "Infinite Mirage" (2015)
- "Soul Eternal" (2015)
- "I See You Messenger" (2015)
- "Owner of a Lonely Heart" (1983/2015)

Part 2:

- "New Country" (1976/not yet published)
- "Wonderous Stories" (1977/2015)
- "Long Distance Runaround" (1971/not yet published)
- "Renaissance of the Sun" (1976/2015)
- "Enigmatic Ocean Parts 1 & 2" (incl. drums solo) (1977/not yet published)
- "New New World" (2015)
- "And You and I" (1972/2015)
- "Starship Trooper" (1971/not yet published)
- "Bass solo" (not yet published) →
- "Roundabout" (1971/2015)

Date	City	Country	Venue
North America Winter-Spring 2014 Tour (billed as "An acoustic evening with Jon Anderson, original singer/songwriter of Yes")
15 February 2014	Clearwater	United States	Ruth Eckerd Hall (Note: On 15 February 2014 in Clearwater, Jon Anderson is opening for Alan Parsons Project with a Symphony orchestra.)
21 February 2014	Miami to Great Stirrup Cay & Grand Bahama Island	United States	"Progressive Nation At Sea 2014" Cruise (18–22 February)
23 February 2014	Austin	United States	One World Theatre
24 February 2014	The Woodlands	United States	Dosey Doe - The Big Barn
26 February 2014	Dallas	United States	Kessler Theater
14 March 2014	Aspen	United States	Wheeler Opera House
27 March 2014	Newton	United States	The Newton Theatre
29 March 2014	Port Washington	United States	Landmark On Main Street - Jean Rimsky Theater
30 March 2014	Newark	United States	New Jersey Performing Arts Center - Victoria Theater
2 April 2014	Glenside	United States	The Keswick Theatre
3 April 2014	Bethlehem	United States	ArtsQuest Center at Steel Stacks - Musikfest Café
5 April 2014	New York City	United States	B.B. King Blues Club & Grill
8 April 2014	Woodstock	United States	Bearsville Theater (Note: Radio Woodstock Presents: The Paul Green Rock Academy with special guest Jon Anderson playing the music of Yes - Two Performances : April 8 & 9, 2014. On the 2nd night, Jon Anderson covered The Beatles' Every Little Thing (Lennon/McCartney) from Yes' 1969 Yes album.)
9 April 2014	Woodstock	United States	Bearsville Theater
11 April 2014	Niagara Falls	United States	Seneca Niagara Casino and Hotel - The Bear's Den
12 April 2014	Albany	United States	Empire State Plaza Performing Arts Center - The Egg Swyer Theatre
13 April 2014	Ridgefield	United States	The Ridgefield Playhouse
17 April 2014	Rockport	United States	The Rockport Shalin Liu Performance Center
19 April 2014	Oakville	Canada	Oakville Centre For The Performing Arts
22 April 2014	Woonsocket	United States	Stadium Theatre
23 April 2014	Londonderry	United States	Tupelo Music Hall
24 April 2014	Londonderry	United States	Tupelo Music Hall
North America Summer 2014 Shows
16 August 2014	Chesterfield, Missouri	United States	Logan University – Chesterfield Amphitheater
31 August 2014	Avila Beach, CA	United States	Avila Beach Golf Resort (Note: Special appearance at "Pops By the Sea" with The San Luis Obispo Symphony. Also with Inga Swearingen.)
Anderson Ponty Band's debut show (Note: Anderson Ponty Band is Jon Anderson's new band formed with French violinist Jean-Luc Ponty.) (Note: After a three-week residency in Aspen, Colorado, rehearsing and recording for the new album, the Anderson Ponty Band publicly performed a warm-up show on 20 September 2014, before their planned world tour initially scheduled for spring/summer 2015 then postponed and finally rescheduled for October–November 2015. This was the band's debut live performance before an audience. A CD/DVD release and a Digital Download of the show were scheduled for release on 25 September 2015.)
20 September 2014	Aspen, Colorado	United States	Wheeler Opera House
South America Fall 2014 Tour
16 October 2014	Curitiba (Tarumã)	Brazil	Phoenix American Mex
18 October 2014	São Paulo (Vila Cruzeiro)	Brazil	Teatro HSBC Brasil
19 October 2014	Rio de Janeiro (Flamengo)	Brazil	Teatro Vivo Rio
21 October 2014	Belo Horizonte (Centro)	Brazil	Cine Theatro Brasil Vallourec
24 October 2014	Santiago	Chile	Teatro Caopolican
North America Fall 2014 Shows
~~19 November 2014~~	San Francisco	United States	~~The Regency Ballroom~~ (show postponed due to Jon Anderson's sinus problems)
~~22 November 2014~~	Las Vegas	United States	~~Boulder Station Hotel The Railhead~~ (show postponed due to Jon Anderson's sinus problems)

=== 2015: As Jon Anderson (unique show) ===
Date	City	Country	Venue
Jon Anderson's North America Spring 2015 unique show
19 June 2015	Kahului, HI	United States	McCoy Studio Theatre

=== 2015: As APB (Better Late Than Never Tour) ===
In support of the Anderson Ponty Band's debut album, Better Late Than Never (released on 25 September 2015), a 17-date North America Fall 2015 tour named the "Better Late Than Never" tour was scheduled, starting on 23 October 2015 in Stroudsburg, Pennsylvania, and ending on 21 November 2015 in Scottsdale, Arizona. The APB's 2015 touring lineup was Jon Anderson, Jean-Luc Ponty, Rayford Griffin, Wally Minko, Keith Jones and Jamie Glaser.

The Anderson Ponty Band (APB) rehearsed for two weeks at the Sherman Theater in Stroudsburg, PA in anticipation of the 27 October 2015 show in Glenside, PA (the originally planned start of the tour). Then the Sherman Theater asked the band to play a show in Stroudsburg before the true beginning of the tour. Thus, the 23 October 2015 show was announced only just one week earlier.

Anderson Ponty Band's North America Fall 2015 "Better Late Than Never" Tour typical setlist:

Set #1:

- Intro (2015; track #1 from the Better Late Than Never album) →
- "One In the Rhythm of Hope" (2015)
- "A For Aria" (2015)
- "Owner Of A Lonely Heart" (1983/2015)
- "Listening With Me" (2015)
- "Time And A Word" (1970/2015) (sometimes incl. "One Love" snippet (1977))
- "Infinite Mirage" (2015)
- "Soul Eternal" (2015)
- "Jig" (not yet published) or "Enigmatic Oceans" (incl. Drum Solo) (1977/not yet published)
- "I See You Messenger" (2015)
- "New New World" (2011/2015)

Set #2:

- Intro (sometimes incl. "Close To The Edge" snippet (1972)) →
- "New Country" (1976/not yet published)
- "Under Heaven's Door" (2010) (also known as "Never" or "Never Ever")
- "Wonderous Stories" (1977/2015)
- "Long Distance Runaround" (1971/not yet published)
- "Renaissance of the Sun" (1976/2015)
- "State of Independence" (1981/not yet published)
- "Enigmatic Oceans" (incl. Drum Solo) (1977/not yet published) or "Jig" (not yet published)
- "And You And I" (1972/2015)
- (Keith Jones) Bass Solo (not yet published) →
- "Roundabout" (1971/2015)

Encore:

- "Re-Remembering Molecules" (2015) (sometimes incl. "Yours Is No Disgrace" snippet (1971)) (not played at all the late shows of the tour)
- "Soon" (1974/not yet published) (not played at all the late shows of the tour)

Date	City	Country	Venue
Anderson Ponty Band's North America Fall 2015 "Better Late Than Never" Tour
23 October 2015	Stroudsburg	United States	Sherman Theater
27 October 2015	Glenside	United States	Keswick Theatre
29 October 2015	Red Bank	United States	Count Basie Theatre
30 October 2015	Ridgefield	United States	The Ridgefield Playhouse
1 November 2015	Munhall	United States	Carnegie Music Hall of Homestead
3 November 2015	St. Charles	United States	The Arcada Theatre
4 November 2015	Milwaukee	United States	South Milwaukee Performing Arts
6 November 2015	Detroit	United States	Music Hall Center
7 November 2015	Toronto	Canada	Danforth Music Hall
10 November 2015	Washington, D.C.	United States	Howard Theatre
11 November 2015	Huntington	United States	The Paramount
13 November 2015	New York City	United States	New York Society for Ethical Culture
14 November 2015	Boston	United States	Berklee Performance Center
17 November 2015	San Francisco	United States	Regency Ballroom
18 November 2015	Sacramento	United States	Crest Theatre
20 November 2015	Beverly Hills	United States	Saban Theatre
21 November 2015	Scottsdale	United States	Talking Stick Resort & Casino

=== 2016: As APB (Better Late Than Never Tour) ===
From 25 February to 11 March 2016, the Anderson Ponty Band revealed, via their official Facebook page, the 18 dates of their Spring 2016 North-American Tour due to kick off on 28 April 2016 in Tucson, Arizona and to end with two shows in Canada on 26 May 2016 in Montreal, Québec and on 27 May 2016 in Québec City, Québec.

It was announced that the APB's 2016 touring lineup would remain Jon Anderson, Jean-Luc Ponty, Rayford Griffin, Wally Minko, Keith Jones and Jamie Glaser.

Anderson Ponty Band's North America Spring 2016 "Better Late Than Never" Tour typical setlist:

Set #1:

- Intro (2015; track #1 from the Better Late Than Never album) →
- "One In the Rhythm of Hope" (2015)
- "A For Aria" (2015)
- "Owner Of A Lonely Heart" (1983/2015)
- "Listening With Me" (2015)
- "Time And A Word" (1970/2015) (sometimes incl. "One Love" snippet (1977))
- "Infinite Mirage" (2015)
- "Soul Eternal" (2015)
- "Jig" (not yet published) (or "Enigmatic Oceans" (incl. Drum Solo) (1977/not yet published) only on 28 April 2016)
- "New New World" (2011/2015)

Set #2:

- Intro: The Revealing Science of God (Jon's spoken lyrics) (1973)) →
- "New Country" (1976/not yet published)
- "Under Heaven's Door" (2010) (also known as "Never" or "Never Ever")
- "Wonderous Stories" (1977/2015)
- "Long Distance Runaround" (1971/not yet published)
- "Renaissance of the Sun" (1976/2015)
- "State of Independence" (1981/not yet published)
- "Enigmatic Oceans" (incl. Drum Solo) (1977/not yet published) (or "Jig" (not yet published) only on 28 April 2016)
- "And You And I" (1972/2015)
- (Keith Jones) Bass Solo (not yet published) →
- "Roundabout" (1971/2015)

Encore:

- Close to the Edge (Jon's spoken lyrics) (1972)) →
- "Re-Remembering Molecules" (2015) (sometimes incl. "Yours Is No Disgrace" snippet (1971))
- "Soon" (1974/not yet published)

Compared with the North America Fall 2015 "Better Late Than Never" Tour typical setlist, the main differences here are the song "I See You Messenger" dropped from the setlist and two Jon's spoken lyrics intros added to the setlist, one before the 2nd set and the other before the encore.

Date	City	Country	Venue
Anderson Ponty Band's North America Spring 2016 "Better Late Than Never" Tour
28 April 2016	Tucson	United States	Fox Tucson Theatre
30 April 2016	Agoura Hills	United States	The Canyon Theater
1 May 2016	Anaheim	United States	The Grove of Anaheim
4 May 2016	Boulder	United States	Boulder Theater
6 May 2016	Dallas	United States	Majestic Theatre
7 May 2016	Austin	United States	One World Theatre
10 May 2016	Burnsville	United States	Ames Center
11 May 2016	St. Charles	United States	The Arcada Theatre
13 May 2016	St. Louis	United States	The Pageant
14 May 2016	Madison	United States	Barrymore Theatre
17 May 2016	North Tonawanda	United States	Riviera Theatre
18 May 2016	Tarrytown	United States	Tarrytown Music Hall
20 May 2016	Beverly	United States	Cabot Performing Arts Center
21 May 2016	Northampton	United States	Calvin Theater
23 May 2016	Ridgefield	United States	The Ridgefield Playhouse
25 May 2016	Albany	United States	The Egg - Hart Theatre
26 May 2016	Montreal	Canada	St. Denis Theatre
27 May 2016	Quebec	Canada	Palais Montcalm

=== 2019: 1000 Hands Tour ===
Setlist from the Orlando (Disney Epcot) warmup show on March 12, 2019:

Set #1:

- "Owner of A Lonely Heart" (1983)
- "America" (1972/1975)
- "Yours Is No Disgrace" (1971)
- "Makes Me Happy" (2019) (1000 Hands: Chapter One excerpt)
- "Roundabout" (1971)

Set #2:

- "Owner of A Lonely Heart" (1983)
- "I’ve Seen All Good People" (1971)
- "Starship Trooper / Solid Space" (1971) / (1976) (Olias of Sunhillow excerpt)
- "Ramalama" (2019) (1000 Hands: Chapter One excerpt)
- "Roundabout" (1971)

Set #3:

- "Owner of A Lonely Heart" (1983)
- "Makes Me Happy" (2019) (1000 Hands: Chapter One excerpt)
- "WDMCF" ("Where Does Music Come From") (2019) (1000 Hands: Chapter One excerpt)
- "Yours Is No Disgrace" (1971)
- "Roundabout" (1971)

Typical setlist (starting from the Lynn show on March 29, 2019):

Set #1:

- "Ocean Song" (1976) (Olias of Sunhillow excerpt)
- "Owner of a Lonely Heart" (1983)
- "Yours is No Disgrace" (1971)
- "Ramalama" (2019) (1000 Hands: Chapter One excerpt)
- "State of Independence " (1981)
- "Makes Me Happy" (2019) (1000 Hands: Chapter One excerpt)
- "I've Seen All Good People" (1971)
- "WDMCF" ("Where Does Music Come From") (2019) (1000 Hands: Chapter One excerpt)

Set #2:

- "Flight of the Moorglade" (1976) (Olias of Sunhillow excerpt)
- "Sweet Dreams" (1970)
- "To the Runner" (1976) (Olias of Sunhillow excerpt)
- "First Born Leaders" (2019) (1000 Hands: Chapter One excerpt)
- "America" (1972/1975)
- "Come Up (1000 Hands)" (2019) (1000 Hands: Chapter One excerpt)
- "Starship Trooper / Solid Space" (1971) / (1976) (Olias of Sunhillow excerpt)

Encore:

- "Roundabout" (1971)

Date	City	Country	Venue
Jon Anderson's "1000 Hands: Chapter One" US Solo Tour
March 11, 2019	Lake Buena Vista, Florida	United States	America Gardens Theater
March 12, 2019	Lake Buena Vista, Florida	United States	America Gardens Theater
March 29, 2019	Lynn, Massachusetts	United States	Lynn Memorial Auditorium
March 31, 2019	Northfield, Ohio	United States	MGM Northfield Park
April 1, 2019	Annapolis, Maryland	United States	Maryland Hall for the Creative Arts
April 3, 2019	Ridgefield, Connecticut	United States	Ridgefield Playhouse
April 4, 2019	Englewood, New Jersey	United States	Bergen Performing Arts Center
April 6, 2019	Collingswood, New Jersey	United States	Scottish Rite Auditorium
April 7, 2019	Derry, New Hampshire	United States	Tupelo Music Hall
April 9, 2019	Reading, Pennsylvania	United States	Santander Performing Arts Center
April 11, 2019	St. Charles, Illinois	United States	Arcada Theatre
April 12, 2019	Waukegan, Illinois	United States	Genesee Theatre
April 14, 2019	Munhall, Pennsylvania	United States	Carnegie Music Hall
April 15, 2019	Wilkes-Barre, Pennsylvania	United States	F.M. Kirby Center for the Performing Arts
April 19, 2019	Milwaukee, Wisconsin	United States	Uihlein Hall
April 20, 2019	St. Paul, Minnesota	United States	Fitzgerald Theater
April 23, 2019	Tucson, Arizona	United States	Fox Tucson Theater
April 24, 2019	San Diego, California	United States	Humphrey's Concerts By the Bay
April 26, 2019	Beverly Hills, California	United States	Saban Theater
April 27, 2019	North Las Vegas, Nevada	United States	Cannery Hotel and Casino
April 30, 2019	Phoenix, Arizona	United States	The Van Buren
May 6, 2019	Nashville, Tennessee	United States	Ryman Auditorium
May 8, 2019	Clearwater, Florida	United States	Capitol Theater
May 10, 2019	Orlando, Florida	United States	Walt Disney Theater (Note: This was a benefit concert for the Kids Beating Cancer charity.)
May 11, 2019	Biloxi, Mississippi	United States	Beau Rivage Theatre
May 12, 2019	Arlington, Texas	United States	AT&T Stadium (Note: Part of the Kaaboo Texas festival.)
July 26, 2019	New York City, New York	United States	St. George Theater
July 27, 2019	Patchogue, New York	United States	Patchogue Theater for the Performing Arts
July 29, 2019	Ocean City, New Jersey	United States	Ocean City Music Pier
August 2, 2019	Asbury Park, New Jersey	United States	Paramount Theater
August 3, 2019	Bensalem, Pennsylvania	United States	Xcite Center
August 5, 2019	Alexandria, Virginia	United States	The Birchmere
August 8, 2019	Grand Rapids, Michigan	United States	20 Monroe Live
August 9, 2019	Detroit, Michigan	United States	GM Riverfront Plaza (Note: Part of the Rockin' on the Riverfront festival.)
August 10, 2019	Fort Wayne, Indiana	United States	Clyde Theater
August 13, 2019	Rocky Mount, Virginia	United States	Harvester Performance Center
August 14, 2019	Knoxville, Tennessee	United States	Bijou Theater
August 16, 2019	Marietta, Ohio	United States	Peoples Bank Theater
August 17, 2019	New Buffalo, Michigan	United States	Four Winds Casino
August 20, 2019	Boulder, Colorado	United States	Boulder Theater
August 21, 2019	Beaver Creek, Colorado	United States	Vilar Performing Arts Center
August 23, 2019	Ridgefield, Washington	United States	Ilani Casino
August 24, 2019	Napa, California	United States	Uptown Theater
August 26, 2019	Folsom, California	United States	Harris Center for the Arts
August 29, 2019	Pasadena, California	United States	The Rose
August 30, 2019	Ojai, California	United States	Libbey Bowl
September 1, 2019	Montclair, California	United States	The Canyon

== The 2020s ==
=== 2021: US tour with the Paul Green Rock Academy ===
On 30 June 2021, Anderson announced a Summer 2021 11-city tour of US theaters with the Paul Green Rock Academy due to kick off 30 July in Patchogue, New York, and to wrap up 28 August in Woonsocket, Rhode Island. According to a press release, the show should feature «a set of Yes classics, deep cuts, mashups, and solo works, all with lush arrangements featuring choral singing, horns, and all the other benefits of having a backing band of 25 young musicians.»

Date	Venue	Country	City
Jon Anderson's US tour with the Paul Green Rock Academy
July 30, 2021	Bearsville Theater	United States	Woodstock, NY
Aug 1, 2021	Blue Ocean Music Hall	United States	Salisbury, MA
Aug 3, 2021	Rams Head on Stage	United States	Annapolis, MD
Aug 5, 2021	Ridgefield Playhouse	United States	Ridgefield, CT
Aug 7, 2021	Colonial Theatre	United States	Phoenixville, PA
Aug 9, 2021	Ocean City Music Pier	United States	Ocean City, NJ
Aug 19, 2021	Des Plaines Theatre	United States	Des Plaines, IL
Aug 21, 2021	Arcada Theatre	United States	St. Charles, IL
Aug 24, 2021	Palace Theatre	United States	Canton, OH
Aug 27, 2021	Paramount Theatre	United States	Huntington, NY
Aug 28, 2021	Stadium Theater	United States	Woonsocket, RI

=== 2022: US tour with the Paul Green Rock Academy ===
On 10 February 2022, Anderson announced a spring 2022 5-city tour of US theaters with the Paul Green Rock Academy due to kick off April 6, 2022, in Atlanta, Georgia, and to wrap up April 16, 2022, in Sarasota, Florida.

Date	Venue	Country	City
Jon Anderson's Spring US tour with the Paul Green Rock Academy
April 6, 2022	Variety Playhouse	United States	Atlanta, GA
April 10, 2022	Capital Theatre	United States	Clearwater, FL
April 12, 2022	King Center for the Performing Arts	United States	Melbourne, FL
April 14, 2022	The Plaza Live	United States	Orlando, FL
April 16, 2022	Rosfest at the Sarasota Opera House	United States	Sarasota, FL

=== 2022: "Close to the Edge 50th Anniversary" US Tour with the Paul Green Rock Academy ===
Date	Venue	Country	City
Jon Anderson's Summer US tour with the Paul Green Rock Academy
July 7, 2022	The Flying Monkey Performing Arts Center	United States	Plymouth, NH
July 8, 2022	The Cabot	United States	Beverly, MA
July 13, 2022	The Paramount	United States	Huntington, NY
July 14, 2022	Wellmont Theater	United States	Montclair, NJ
July 16, 2022	Ridgefield Playhouse	United States	Ridgefield, CT
July 17, 2022	Sugar Loaf Performing Arts Center	United States	Sugar Loaf, NY
July 20, 2022	Keswick Theatre	United States	Glenside, PA
July 22, 2022	The Kent Stage	United States	Kent, OH
July 23, 2022	Des Plaines Theatre	United States	Des Plaines, IL
July 27, 2022	The Palace Theatre	United States	Greensburg, PA
July 30, 2022	Pabst Theater	United States	Milwaukee, WI
July 31, 2022	The Arcada Theatre	United States	St. Charles, IL
August 3, 2022	The State Theatre	United States	State College, PA
August 6, 2022	The Egg	United States	Albany, NY

=== 2023: "Yes Epics and Classics" US tour with The Band Geeks ===
Date	Venue	Country	City
Jon Anderson's Spring US tour "Yes Epics and Classics" with The Band Geeks
April 14, 2023	The Space	United States	Westbury, NY
April 16, 2023	NJPAC	United States	Newark, NJ
April 21, 2023	The Palladium	United States	New York, NY
April 23, 2023	Santander Arena	United States	Reading, PA
April 28, 2023	Scottish Rite	United States	Collingswood, NJ
April 29, 2023	Scottish Rite	United States	Collingswood, NJ
May 3, 2023	Capital One Hall	United States	Tysons Corner, VA
May 6, 2023	Lyric Performing Arts Center	United States	Baltimore, MD
May 9, 2023	Family Arena	United States	St. Charles, MO
May 12, 2023	Arcada Theatre	United States	St. Charles, IL
May 13, 2023	Des Plaines Theatre	United States	Des Plaines, IL
May 16, 2023	Riviera Theatre	United States	North Tonawanda, NY

=== 2024: "Yes Epics, Classics and More feat. Jon Anderson and The Band Geeks" ===
Date	Venue	Country	City
2024 (22-show) North American tour
May 30, 2024	State Theatre	United States	New Brunswick, NJ
June 1, 2024	Bergen Performing Arts Center	United States	Englewood, NJ
June 3, 2024	Kodak Center Theatre	United States	Rochester, NY
June 6, 2024	Hart Theatre	United States	Albany, NY
June 8, 2024	Point of The Bluff Concert Pavilion	United States	Hammondsport, NY
June 13, 2024	Copernicus	United States	Chicago, IL
June 15, 2024	Hollywood Casino Amphitheatre	United States	St. Louis, MO
June 18, 2024	Palace Theater	United States	Greensburg, PA
June 20, 2024	Hershey Theatre	United States	Hershey, PA
June 22, 2024	Capitol Center of the Arts: Chubb Theatre	United States	Concord, NH
June 25, 2024	Shubert Theatre	United States	Boston, MA
June 27, 2024	Ridgefield Playhouse	United States	Ridgefield, CT
July 21, 2024	Great South Bay Music Festival, Shorefront Park	United States	Patchogue, NY
July 24, 2024	Ryman Auditorium	United States	Nashville, TN*
July 27, 2024	Frederick Brown Jr. Amphitheater	United States	Peachtree City, GA
July 30, 2024	Ozarks Amphitheater	United States	Camdenton, MO*
Aug 2, 2024	Azura Amphitheater	United States	Bonner Springs, KS*
Aug 4, 2024	The Astro Outdoors	United States	La Vista, NE*
Aug 7, 2024	The Ledge Amphitheater	United States	Waite Park, MN*
Aug 10, 2024	Paramount	United States	Denver, CO
Aug 14, 2024	Celebrity Theatre	United States	Phoenix, AZ
Aug 16, 2024	Performing Arts Center	United States	Thousand Oaks, CA

(*) with special guests The Return of Emerson, Lake & Palmer

=== 2025: "Yes Epics, Classics and More feat. Jon Anderson and The Band Geeks" ===
Date	Venue	Country	City
2025 (18-show) North American tour - 1st leg
April 1, 2025	Rialto Theater	United States	Tucson, AZ
April 3, 2025	The Grove of Anaheim	United States	Anaheim, CA
April 5, 2025	The Theater at Virgin Hotels Las Vegas	United States	Las Vegas, NV
April 8, 2025	Fox Theater	United States	Oakland, CA
April 11, 2025	SAFE Credit Union Performing Arts Center	United States	Sacramento, CA
April 14, 2025	Moore Theater	United States	Seattle, WA
April 19, 2025	Coronado Performing Arts Center	United States	Rockford, IL
April 23, 2025	Pabst Theater	United States	Milwaukee, WI
April 25, 2025	Des Plaines Theater	United States	Des Plaines, IL
April 27, 2025	The Arcada Theater	United States	St. Charles, IL
April 30, 2025	Riviera Theater	United States	North Tonawanda, NY
May 2, 2025	The Agora	United States	Cleveland, OH
May 4, 2025	American Music Theater	United States	Lancaster, PA
May 7, 2025	The Grand Opera House	United States	Wilmington, DE
May 10, 2025	The Ridgefield Playhouse	United States	Ridgefield, CT
May 12, 2025	The Ridgefield Playhouse	United States	Ridgefield, CT
May 16, 2025	The Flagstar at Westbury Music Fair	United States	Westbury, NY
May 18, 2025	Carteret Performing Arts Center	United States	Carteret, NJ
2025 (10-show) North American tour - 2nd leg
June 15, 2025	Warner Theatre	United States	Washington, DC
June 18, 2025	Circle Square Cultural Center	United States	Ocala, FL
June 20, 2025	Ruth Eckerd Hall	United States	Clearwater, FL
June 23, 2025	Moody Performance Hall	United States	Dallas, TX
June 25, 2025	Paramount Theatre	United States	Austin, TX
June 27, 2025	H-E-B Performance Hall	United States	San Antonio, TX
July 5, 2025	Timber Rock Amphitheater	United States	Farmington, PA
July 7, 2025	Ocean City Music Pier	United States	Ocean City, NJ
July 11, 2025	Warner Theatre	United States	Washington, DC
July 13, 2025	The Factory	United States	Chesterfield, MO

=== 2026: "Yes Epics, Classics and More feat. Jon Anderson and The Band Geeks" ===
Date	Venue	Country	City
2026 (10-show) North American tour
April 17, 2026	Ridgefield Playhouse	United States	Ridgefield, CT
April 19, 2026	Ridgefield Playhouse	United States	Ridgefield, CT
April 21, 2026	Patchogue Theatre	United States	Patchogue, NY
April 23, 2026	Count Basie Theatre	United States	Red Bank, NJ
April 26, 2026	Kodak Center Theater	United States	Rochester, NY
April 28, 2026	Hershey Theater	United States	Hershey, PA
April 30, 2026	Landsdowne Theater	United States	Landsdowne, PA
May 2, 2026	Landsdowne Theater	United States	Landsdowne, PA
May 5, 2026	Troy Savings Bank Music Hall	United States	Troy, NY
May 7, 2026	Royal Oak Theatre	United States	Royal Oak, MI
2026 (9-show) UK & Sweden tour
September 15, 2026	Symphony Hall	UK	Birmingham
September 17, 2026	Forum	UK	Bath
September 20, 2026	Palladium	UK	London
September 22, 2026	Philharmonic	UK	Liverpool
September 26, 2026	Opera House	UK	Manchester
September 28, 2026	Royal Concert Hall	UK	Glasgow
October 1, 2026	Glasshouse	UK	Gateshead
October 3, 2026	Cirkus	Sweden	Stockholm
October 5, 2026	Slagthuset	Sweden	Malmö
