= Family (Noah Gundersen EP) =

EP by Noah Gundersen
- Released: August 6, 2011
- Recorded: Dallas, Texas
- Genre: Acoustic, indie folk
- Length: 26:29
- Label: Independent
- Producer: Daniel Mendez, Noah Gundersen, Abby Gundersen

Noah Gundersen chronology
Fearful Bones (2010)	Family (2011)	Ledges (2014)

Family is the self-released third EP by Noah Gundersen. It was recorded by Daniel Mendez (who has previously worked with Lit, Dashboard Confessional, Duran Duran, Heart, and Train) and mastered by Ed Brooks in just under a week in Dallas. It was released on August 6, 2011. The 7-track EP features Noah's sister, Abby Gundersen, who plays violin and sings vocal harmonies on several tracks. Family has been called genre-defying and at times reminiscent of Ryan Adams, Fleet Foxes, Tom Waits, and Neil Young. The EP can be downloaded on Noah Gundersen's Bandcamp page.

Noah felt the title of the EP to be fitting as it "pays homage to the people who have shaped his life." "Family comes in many forms," says Noah. "It lives with us, for better and for worse. It shapes us. That's what this album is about."

== Track listing ==
1. "David" – 3:39
2. "Fire" – 4:47
3. "Nashville" – 3:37
4. "San Antonio Fading" – 4:12
5. "Honest Songs" – 2:58
6. "Garden" – 3:42
7. "Family" – 3:34

== Personnel ==
- Noah Gundersen – vocals/guitar
- Abby Gundersen – vocal harmony/violin/string composition
- Daniel Mendez – production, recording, mixing
- Ed Brooks – mastering

== In popular culture ==
- The title track, "Family," appears in a season four episode of The Vampire Diaries called "Stand By Me". The song is also featured in a season four episode of Sons of Anarchy, entitled "With An X."
- The song "David" also appears in a season four episode of Sons of Anarchy, called "Burnt and Purged Away." The song is also featured in a Season 3 episode of The Following, entitled "Reunion."
