= A Pillar of Salt =

Studio album by Noah Gundersen
- Released: October 8, 2021
- Label: Cooking Vinyl America
- Producer: Andy Park

Noah Gundersen chronology
Lover (2019)	A Pillar of Salt (2021)	If This Is The End (2023)

A Pillar of Salt is the sixth studio album by American folk music artist Noah Gundersen. It was released by Cooking Vinyl America on October 8, 2021.

== Background ==
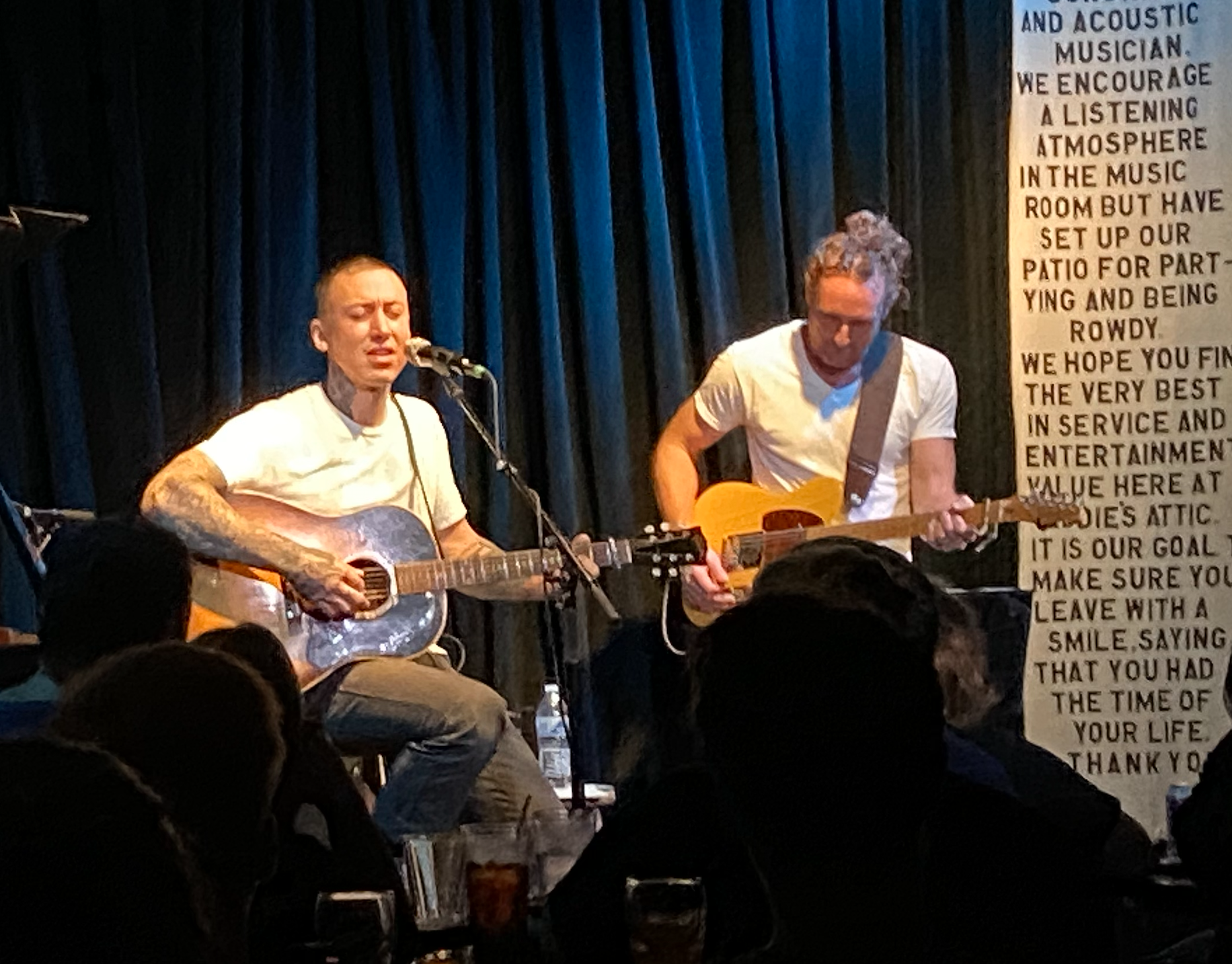
Noah Gundersen performs an acoustic set at Eddie's Attic in Decatur, Georgia on October 15, 2021.

A Pillar of Salt was written over a period starting in March 2020 and continuing well into 2021. On September 13, Gundersen announced that the full album would be released on October 8, and provided links to pre-order vinyl LP or CD copies. The following day he announced the album would be performed live in its entirety at St. Mark's Cathedral in Seattle on December 4.

On September 29, Gundersen outlined an upcoming 2022 Europe/UK Tour in support of A Pillar of Salt. Beginning in March 2022, Gundersen toured for two and a half weeks across Europe, starting in Stockholm and finishing in Dublin.

== Release ==
=== Physical release ===
The long single for the album, "Sleepless in Seattle", premiered on streaming services on September 10, 2021. The album released in its entirety on October 8. Physical copies were made available for purchase on Gundersen's online store, and the album is on all major streaming services.

=== Reception ===
A Pillar of Salt received widespread critical acclaim. Sputnik Music said that the album "takes ageless topics such as identity, vices, and faith and makes them both deeply personal and widely universal" in its 4.5/5 star review. Gundersen's lyricism was a common theme across positive reviews. In its 8.0/10 review of the album, The Line of Best Fit remarked: "It's a scrapbook of life and its lessons, considered in retrospect by a veteran writer and musician."

Additionally, upon the release of the album Gundersen was featured on Spotify's Grade A playlist as the cover artist. The playlist, which curates what it describes as 'a quality alternative blend', featured "Atlantis" in its October 8 edition.

Despite not being released as a promotional single, "Atlantis" was a major source of media attention for A Pillar of Salt, largely due to the fame of guest vocalist Phoebe Bridgers. British music outlet NME described the track as "somber" and noted the music video, which was shot entirely on an iPhone. KEXP, one of Seattle's largest public radio stations, called the album "a well-crafted set of brooding folk-pop with an atmospheric sound featuring acoustic and electric guitars, piano, haunting melodies and introspective lyrics."

Craig Manning of Chorus.fm called the album "a goddamn masterpiece". He observed in his review that the album served as an amalgamation of qualities from Gundersen's previous discography: "Everything he did well on each of his previous albums is here somewhere, and it all meshes together into a perfect tapestry. The throwback troubadour of Ledges; the thoughtful intellectual of Carry the Ghost; the architect of all those big, bruising crescendos that drove White Noise; the pop polyglot of Lover."

== Themes ==
Like much of his music, A Pillar of Salt depicts Gundersen's earnest ambivalence concerning spiritual issues, in spite of the aching consequences and worry this causes himself and his loved ones. "He is unafraid of irreverently subverting biblical wisdom" in order to ask the question, "What will win in the end: the will of a man... or the unseen powers of providential fate?"

== Track listing ==
All tracks are written by Noah Gundersen.

No.	Title	Length
1.	"Laurel and Hardy"	4:23
2.	"Body"	3:37
3.	"The Coast"	4:37
4.	"Exit Signs"	4:01
5.	"Atlantis" (featuring Phoebe Bridgers)	5:19
6.	"Magic Trick"	4:01
7.	"Blankets"	3:52
8.	"Bright Lost Things"	5:15
9.	"Sleepless in Seattle"	4:00
10.	"Back to Me"	3:33
11.	"Always There"	3:52
Total length:		47:36

Deluxe Edition (2022)
No.	Title	Length
12.	"Part Of Me"	3:44
13.	"The Only Day"	3:42
14.	"A Pillar Of Salt"	4:43
Total length:		59:45

== Personnel ==
- Noah Gundersen – vocals, songwriting, piano, guitar
- Jason McGerr – percussion
- Andy Park – production
- Abby Gundersen – strings
- Tyler Carrol – bass guitar
- Harrison Whitford – electric guitar
- Dave Dalton – piano
- Greg Leisz – pedal steel guitar
- Phoebe Bridgers – featured vocals
- Alex Westcoat – percussion
- Caleb Crosby – percussion
- Paul Moak – mixing
- Jordan Butcher – cover art design
- Lauren Segal – cover art photography
- Andy Maier – cover art rendering
