= Deer Hill Avenue =

Deer Hill Avenue is an American reality television series. The series revolves around two people; Kirk Rundhaug, real estate guru, featured on the HGTV series Selling New York, and Lou Milano, a radio show personality on WRKI, i95. Also featured are Kirk's daughters, actresses Grace and Sophie Rundhaug. Grace was featured in The Sound of Music on NBC in 2014 with Carrie Underwood, and Sophie has been in commercials and stage productions. The show also includes Mike Bonesera, and Blood, Sweat & Tears founding member, Steve Katz. The show is produced by John Balis and Kevin Burns, and directed by Brean Cunningham.

== Premise and release ==
Deer Hill Avenue takes place in a New England suburb in Danbury, Connecticut. The series premiered to a full house at the Ridgefield Playhouse, Ridgefield, Connecticut in November 2014, and was launched on Comcast Cable in January, 2014.
