= Live at The Triple Door (The Courage album) =

Live album by The Courage
- Released: 2008
- Recorded: Seattle, Washington
- Genres: Americana, folk rock, indie folk
- Length: 36:53
- Label: Independent

The Courage chronology
Live at The Triple Door (2008)	Fearful Bones (2010)

Live at The Triple Door is a live album recorded and released by The Courage in 2008 when they were still known as "Noah Gundersen & the Courage." The set was performed at the venue and lounge The Triple Door in Seattle, Washington.

== Track listing ==
1. "Poor Man's Son" – 5:37
2. "America" – 4:52
3. "Nine Pound Hammer" – 4:19
4. "The Current State of Things" – 5:43
5. "Moss On a Rolling Stone" – 5:43
6. "Oh Momma" – 5:35
7. "Two for a Show" – 5:14
- Tracks 4 and 5 appear on the band's first album, "Brand New World"
- Tracks 1, 3, 4, & 6 aired on the local lounge on KCDA, a different version of "Poor Man's Son" was performed live
- Track 1 later appeared on Noah Gundersen's debut album Ledges

== Personnel ==
- Noah Gundersen – guitar/vocals
- Abby Gundersen – violin/vocals
- Travis Ehrenstrom – bass guitar
- Ivan Gunderson – drums
- Michael Porter – electric guitar/vocals
- Michael Rabb – organ/piano/keys/vocals
- Chris Judd – bass guitar/vocals
- Keelan O'Hara – drums

== Other albums recorded at The Triple Door ==
- Live at The Triple Door (Skerik's Syncopated Taint Septet) by Skerik's Syncopated Taint Septet (recorded in 2003 and released in 2010)
- Live at The Triple Door by Greg Dulli (recorded in 2008)
- Live at The Triple Door by Layla Angulo (released in 2005)
