= Noah Gundersen =

American singer-songwriter (born 1989)

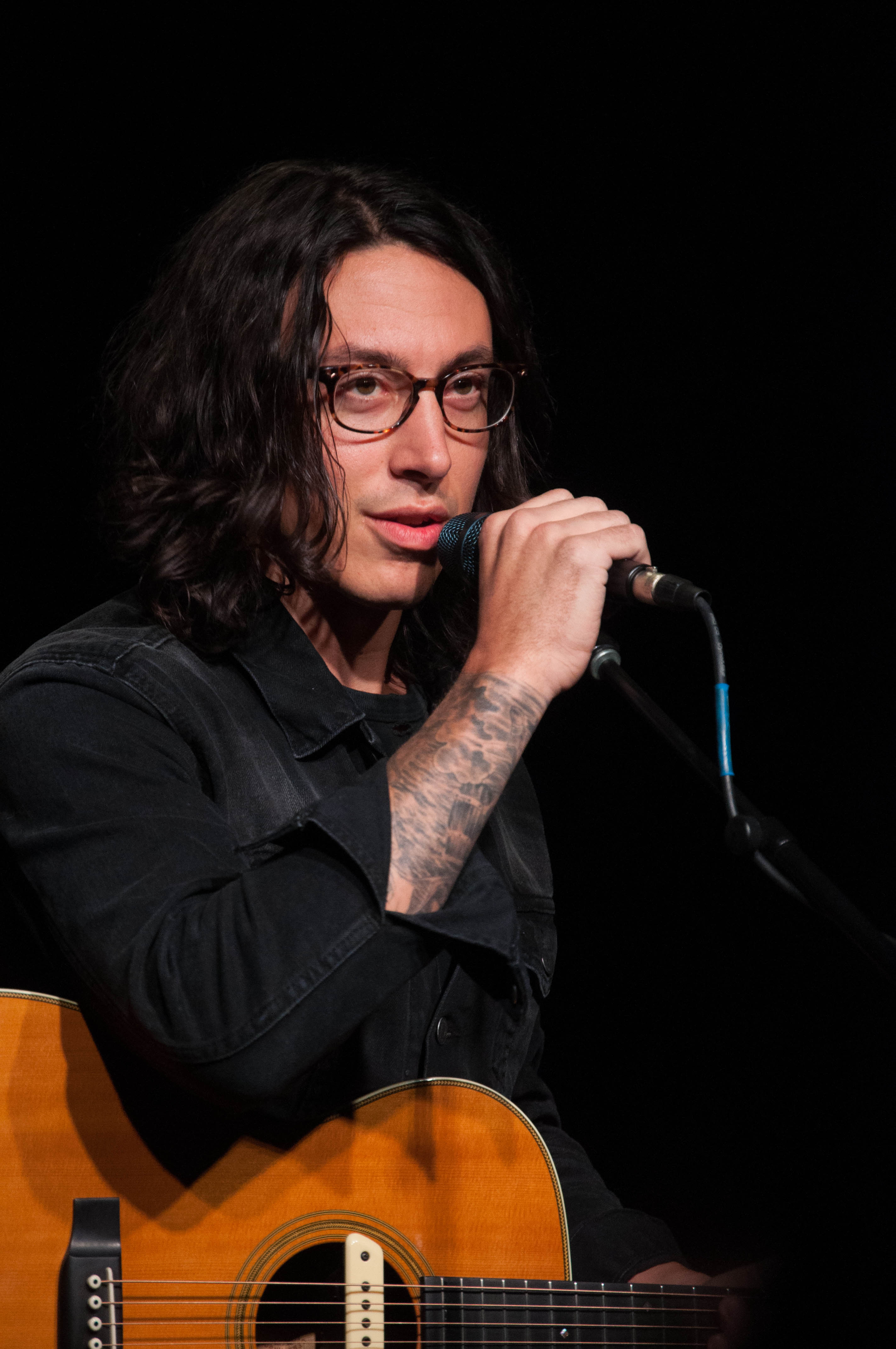
- Gundersen performing at The Camp House in Chattanooga, Tennessee in January 2015

Background information
- Born: May 31, 1989 (age 37); Olympia, Washington, U.S.
- Genre: Indie folk
- Occupations: Singer, songwriter, musician
- Instruments: Guitar, piano
- Years active: 2005–present
- Label: Cooking Vinyl
- Formerly of: The Courage
- Website: www.noahgundersen.com

Noah Gundersen (born May 31, 1989) is an American indie folk singer-songwriter from Seattle.

== Early life ==
Born in Olympia, Washington, Gundersen is the oldest of five biological and three adopted siblings, in a family that moved to Centralia, Washington to homestead when he was five. Gundersen was home schooled in a conservative Christian household. He took piano lessons at age 13 and later learned to play the guitar. At the age of 18, Gundersen left home to pursue a career in music and began to play at venues around Seattle.

As a teenager, Gundersen formed his first band, Beneath Oceans, with a few friends from his high school. The band included Gundersen, Michael Porter on lead guitar, and Keelan O’Hara on drums.

== Career ==
In 2008, Gundersen produced his first EP, Brand New World. Early in his career, he began to perform in Seattle. Among others, Gundersen is said to be influenced by Ryan Adams, Dashboard Confessional, and Neil Young.

In 2008, Gundersen collaborated with friends and his then-16-year-old sister to form the band The Courage. The group served as his backing band as he performed songs from Brand New World at clubs and cafes around Washington state. The group later recorded a live album, Live at the Triple Door, under the name Noah Gundersen & The Courage in 2008. The band performed at the Sisters Folk Festival in both 2008 and 2010 and evolved further, recording their debut album, Fearful Bones, under the name The Courage in 2010.

While also performing and recording with The Courage, Gundersen remained focused on his solo career. His second EP, Saints & Liars, was released in 2009. A rough recording of the EP originally circulated, landing on the desk of producer Daniel Mendez, who mixed the EP for a full release. Mendez then worked with Gundersen to release a follow-up EP, Family in 2011.

Launching his career further into the mainstream, Gundersen's title song "Family" was hand-selected by producer Kurt Sutter for the hit FX TV show, Sons of Anarchy. Sutter again looked to Gundersen and The Forest Rangers to create an original song for the show in 2014, and the song "Day Is Gone" was later nominated for an Emmy Award for Original Music and Lyrics. The song "Family" also appeared on The Vampire Diaries on the CW. The track "David" was also later used in a 2015 episode of the Fox TV series The Following.

In 2014, Gundersen self-produced his debut album, Ledges, at Seattle’s Studio Litho, owned by Pearl Jam guitarist Stone Gossard. The album addressed themes like faith, death, and past relationships. The debut album propelled Gundersen's career further into indie folk stardom, with his song "Poor Man's Son" - which was originally recorded for the Live at the Triple Door album with The Courage - receiving a feature on The Originals. While touring his debut album, Gundersen also exclusively sold a five-song EP titled "Twenty-Something" to concertgoers. Tracks from the EP were later available online through the deluxe edition release of Ledges.

Following up his breakthrough album Ledges, Gundersen returned to the studio to record his second LP, Carry the Ghost, which was released in 2015. The album deals with the challenges of success, failed relationships, religion, and sexuality. Gundersen has said he took inspiration from Neil Young's album Tonight's the Night. Later in 2015, Gundersen helped to produce the David Ramirez album Fables, which released on August 28.

Returning to his hometown during a lull in his tour schedule, Gundersen reunited with friends from his high school band, Beneath Oceans. Originally reuniting as a joke, the group began to play old songs from their early days. Gundersen said of the reunion, "we reconnected to see if the old songs were still any good. They weren’t, so we started writing new ones.” On December 1, 2015 the group released their first album, an EP titled Young in the City. The release was then followed up with live performances in the Seattle area and a second EP titled II on October 7, 2016.

In July 2017, Gundersen announced the completion of a new solo LP, White Noise, which was released on September 22, 2017. It was a departure from the style of his previous albums, with a much heavier, more rock-inspired sound. The final track of the LP, Send the rain (to everyone), featured in The Good Doctor season three finale and in Station 19 first season third episode.

On June 21, 2019, Gundersen announced the forthcoming release of another solo LP, Lover, which was released on August 23, 2019. On the same day, he released a single from the album titled "Robin Williams."

On July 7, 2021, Gundersen announced via Instagram that he had been engaged, bought a house, and that his new record would be out "later in the year," also revealing that a new Young in the City EP "is done and will be out soon."

On August 30, Gundersen posted a blue and white graphic to Instagram, teasing what appeared to be lyrics paired with the number "11," which fans quickly figured out was a countdown. On September 10, Gundersen released a new song, titled "Sleepless in Seattle," which had previously been played during his "Songs and Conversations" livestream series that aired during the height of the COVID-19 pandemic. Gundersen further revealed that the song would appear as the eighth track on his solo LP A Pillar of Salt, which was released on October 8 via his label, Cooking Vinyl.

On September 8, 2023, Gundersen released his sixth solo album, If This Is The End.

On February 27, 2026, Gundersen released the single "Rites Of Spring" in anticipation of an upcoming seventh album. The album, Rites Of Spring, released on May 22, 2026.

== Discography ==
=== Studio albums ===
- Ledges (2014)
- Carry the Ghost (2015)
- White Noise (2017)
- Lover (2019)
- A Pillar of Salt (2021)
- If This Is The End (2023)
- Rites of Spring (2026)

=== EPs ===
- Brand New World (2008)
- Saints & Liars (2009)
- Family (2011)
- Twenty-Something (2014)
- Tour EP (2018)
