= Layla Angulo =

American saxophonist, composer and singer

- Genres: Latin music, jazz, reggaeton
- Occupations: Saxophonist, composer, singer, band director, recording artist
- Instruments: Saxophone, vocals
- Years active: 2005–present

Layla Angulo, and known mononymously as Layla, is an American saxophonist, composer, singer, band director, and recording artist specializing in Latin music.

Layla was born to a Greek mother and an Irish-American father. Her grandfather's upright bass playing inspired her to learn the saxophone at an early age.

Layla's first released album, Live at The Triple Door, was recorded at the noted Seattle theater and released in 2005. The album's first single Que Te Vaya Bien was Top 10 for three months on OurStage and reached semi-finalist position in the International Songwriting Competition (ISC). "La Rumbera"—also from Live at the Triple Door—received ISC Honorable Mention in 2006. The album received warm reviews from Seattle Times and Chip Boaz's Latin Jazz Corner.

Mientras was Layla's second album, recorded in New York with Arturo O’Farrill, Oscar Estagnaro, Tony Escapa, and Dario Escanazi. Released in 2008, Mientras was Editors Pick at Descarga.com and was lauded by critics such as Michael G. Nastos at AllMusic.

Layla moved to New York City in 2009, subsequently spending a year on tour with reggaeton artist Don Omar. Her third album TriAngulo yielded a single, "No Se Como Olvidarte" that rose to #16 on the Billboard Tropical Charts. "Estrella," another song from the same album, reached semi-finalist position in the 2014 ISC. A third song from TriAngulo ("La Pelicula") reached #1 in the National Latin Record Pool.

On March 24, 2015, the International Songwriting Competition announced its 2014 Finalists, including Layla's song Dame Todo.
