= Saints & Liars =

EP by Noah Gundersen
- Released: October 9, 2009
- Recorded: Seattle, Washington
- Genre: Acoustic, indie folk
- Length: 25:01
- Label: Independent
- Producer: Karli Fairbanks

Noah Gundersen chronology
Brand New World (2008)	Saints & Liars (2009)	Fearful Bones (2010)

Professional ratings
Review scores
Source	Rating
Seattle Weekly	not rated

Saints & Liars is the second EP by Noah Gundersen. The name of the EP comes from the track, "Middle of June", in the line "All the saints and the liars sitting by the fire/ what will happen to us now?"

It was recorded in the fall of 2009 with Karli Fairbanks. Several of the songs including "Caroline", "Middle of June", and "Oh, Death" appeared on Noah Gundersen's Myspace as early as September, but the album was released on October 9, 2009. The Courage held a release show the night that Saints & Liars came out to an overcrowded audience at The Q Cafe. Paige Richmond, a journalist for Seattle Weekly wrote a review three days later regarding the performance in a blog titled "Live review: Noah Gundersen Brings Q Cafe Crowd to Its Feet" praising the performance as well as the band's unity.

After the release of the album, the Courage became more dormant as Abby pursued her college career and the majority of the band's shows were performed Noah, Ivan Gunderson, and Travis Ehrentrom in Washington. The song, "Middle of June" appears on the television series One Tree Hill in the episode, "At the Bottom of Everything".

== Track listing ==
1. "Ring A Bell" – 5:17
2. "Caroline" – 3:37
3. "Oh Death" – 5:03
4. "The Ocean" – 4:09
5. "Jesus, Jesus" – 3:42
6. "Middle Of June" – 4:03
- Track 3 "Oh Death" begins with a quote of Camille Saint-Saëns' Introduction and Rondo Capriccioso in A minor on solo violin.

== Personnel ==
- Noah Gundersen – vocals/guitar
- Abby Gundersen – violin/string composition
- Karli Fairbanks – production
- Daniel Mendez – mixing
