= Carry the Ghost =

Studio album by Noah Gundersen
- Released: August 21, 2015
- Recorded: Studio Litho, Seattle
- Genre: Folk, indie folk, Singer/songwriter
- Producer: Noah Gundersen

Noah Gundersen chronology
Twenty-Something (2014)	Carry the Ghost (2015)	White Noise (2017)

Carry the Ghost is the second studio album by American folk music artist Noah Gundersen. It was released by Dualtone Records on August 21, 2015. Gundersen toured in support of the album throughout 2015.

Gundersen turned to Neil Young's “Tonight’s the Night” for inspiration:

“There’s this real ragged edge to that [Neil Young album], like everything’s going to fall apart... I wouldn’t say my record is anywhere near as extreme as that, but we wanted to capture a sense of uncertainty – and have this sonic, raw edge to it.”

According to Gunderson, everything was written on either an acoustic guitar or a piano, then taken into the studio to arrange and add instrumentation. Recording is a collaborative process and, in the past has involved a lot of Noah's family members. However, he indicated he is not including just family now but his touring bass player, Micah Simler, and touring guitar player Armon Jay (AJ) to the recording process as well.

== Themes ==
Noah describes the theme of 'Carry the Ghost' as such:

I think the idea of experience and history shaping who we are, I think that was where that idea came from. It's something we carry, our experiences, and something we live with every day, and you know, we make decisions on how we respond to our experiences, but they are what shapes us. So there's that existential idea. There's also a little bit of a post-relationship aspect to it, but it's not necessarily a break-up album. It's more just an exploration of, ultimately, existentialism.'

== Track listing ==
1. "Slow Dancer"
2. "Halo (Disappear/Reappear)"
3. "Selfish Art"
4. "Show Me the Light"
5. "The Difference"
6. "Silver Bracelet"
7. "I Need a Woman"
8. "Jealous Love"
9. "Empty from the Start"
10. "Blossom"
11. "Topless Dancer"
12. "Heartbreaker"
13. "Planted Seeds"
14. "Fire Don't Die" (Bonus Track)
15. "Alright" (Bonus track)
16. "Running for Cover (Bonus Track)
