= The Courage =

American indie rock band

- Also known as: Noah Gundersen & The Courage
- Origin: Centralia, Washington, United States
- Genres: Indie folk
- Years active: 2008–2011
- Past members: Noah Gundersen; Abby Gundersen; Ivan Gunderson; Travis Ehrenstrom
- Website: thecourageband.com

The Courage (formerly known as "Noah Gundersen & the Courage") was an indie folk band from Centralia, Washington.

== History ==
Seattle-based singer-songwriter Noah Gundersen formed the band The Courage in 2008 in Centralia, Washington. As the group's frontman, Noah Gundersen wrote songs, played guitar, and performed lead vocals for the band. Other founding members of the group included Gundersen's younger sister Abby on violin and backing vocals and three friends, Michael Porter on electric guitar, Chris Judd on bass guitar, and Keelan O'Hara on drums. The Courage would take its final form with Ivan Gunderson (of no relation to Noah and Abby) on drums and Travis Ehrenstrom on the bass guitar.

Founded as a backing band for the purpose of performing Noah Gundersen's solo albums, The Courage began performing together in the Seattle area in 2008. Their initial live performance career was marked by a sold-out live performance at The Triple Door. The live recording of the performance, Live at the Triple Door, was later released as an album under the artist name "Noah Gundersen & The Courage". This gave insight to the group's work as a pairing of Gundersen's existing solo effort with The Courage acting as a backing band of sorts. Songs on the album are mostly live renditions of songs from Noah Gundersen's solo albums, Brand New World (album) and the unreleased Saints & Liars EP.

After the group's live album was released, Noah Gundersen continued to advance in his solo career. His solo EP Saints & Liars was released in 2009 and featured his younger sister Abby on violin and backing vocals, but The Courage was not credited on the album.

With Abby Gunderson still in high school and Noah traveling to tour his solo EP, The Courage at first struggled to grow into a full-fledged band after their live album was released. Using the summer as an opportunity to collaborate more closely and transition from a backing band into a full-fledged group, Noah Gundersen & The Courage began to write and record songs for their first studio album, Fearful Bones. The album was recorded in a barn in Sisters, Oregon by Matt Lee, who mixed and produced the album, in the summer of 2010.

Prior to release it was decided that the album Fearful Bones would be released under the shortened band name "The Courage" because the group was one entity - not a pairing of two artists, as it had been previously on the Live at the Triple Door album. Noah dropped his name from the title after deciding to have the entire band more incorporated in the music. He also wanted to move away from more solo, folk-oriented music, saying, "I love the sound of a band more than a solo performer. You can only have so many options as a solo performer and I’m not a big fan of loop pedals."

In 2011 the group contributed a new song titled "All You Know" to Burning Building Recordings' compilation album, We Love This Comp, Vol. One. The album was released on Bandcamp.

== Band members ==
- Noah Gundersen – vocals, guitar, songwriting
- Abby Gundersen – backing vocals, violin
- Michael Porter – guitar
- Chris Judd – bass guitar
- Keelan O'Hara – drums
- Travis Ehrenstrom – bass guitar
- Ivan Gunderson – drums

== Discography ==
=== Noah Gundersen & The Courage ===
- Live at the Triple Door (live album as Noah Gundersen and the Courage, 2008)

=== The Courage ===
- Fearful Bones (full-length, 2010)
- We Love This Comp, Vol. One (compilation, 2011)
