= Moonshadow Saloon =

Music venue in Atlanta, Georgia, U.S.

- Location of the Moonshadow Saloon
- Location: 1880 Johnson Road; Atlanta, Georgia, U.S.
- Coordinates: 33.80437°N 84.33947°W
- Owner: Bruce Piefke
- Capacity: 675

Construction
- Opened: 1980
- Closed: 1986 (40 years ago)

The Moonshadow Saloon was a popular live-music venue in Atlanta, Georgia, United States. Located near Emory University, it was in operation between 1980 and 1986.

Bruce Piefke, a club owner in the city, founded the club, in a building previously occupied by an A&P supermarket, in 1980 and it became a successful enterprise, generating around $1.5 million in annual revenue. It had a strong affiliation with WQXI-FM. Artists such as R.E.M., Muddy Waters, David Bromberg, Taj Mahal and Warren Zevon played at the venue, which had a 675-seat capacity.

The building was torn down in 2025.
