= Ledges (album) =

Studio album by Noah Gundersen
- Released: February 11, 2014
- Recorded: Studio Litho
- Genres: Acoustic, indie folk
- Length: 45:14
- Label: Independent

Noah Gundersen chronology
Family (2011)	Ledges (2014)	Twenty-Something (2015)

Ledges is the full-length solo debut album by Noah Gundersen. It was self-produced and recorded at Stone Gossard's Studio Litho in Seattle. It was released on February 11, 2014. The track "Poor Man's Son" features Gundersen's sister Abby and brother Jonathan on various instruments.

The first two recordings of the album were abandoned in favor of a self-produced version.

Ledges has been described as "calculated and unyielding, somersaulting its way around a menagerie of heavy, yet unavoidable topics." USA Today wrote that the album "establishes the 24-year-old as a precociously graceful and thoughtful songwriter."

== Track listing ==
No.	Title	Length
1.	"Poor Man's Son"	5:14
2.	"Boathouse"	3:37
3.	"Isaiah"	3:03
4.	"Separator"	3:28
5.	"Ledges"	4:18
6.	"Poison Vine"	4:45
7.	"First Defeat"	4:03
8.	"Cigarettes"	5:40
9.	"Liberator"	4:00
10.	"Dying Now"	4:04
11.	"Time Moves Quickly"	3:02

== Personnel ==
- Noah Gundersen – vocals, guitar
- Abby Gundersen – violin, piano, cello
- Jonathan Gundersen – drums
- Elizabeth Gundersen – vocals
- Seattle Studio Litho – production, recording
