= Fearful Bones =

Studio album by The Courage
- Released: 11 September 2010
- Recorded: 2010
- Genres: Indie, country rock
- Producer: Matt Lee

The Courage chronology
Live at The Triple Door (2008)	Fearful Bones (2010)

Fearful Bones is the only studio album by The Courage, formerly known as Noah Gundersen & the Courage. The album was recorded in a barn in Sisters, Oregon, by Matt Lee, who mixed and produced the album, in summer 2010. It was released at the band's performance in the Crocodile Cafe in Oregon that September which started their promotional tour of the West Coast.

Fearful Bones is seen as a turning point in the history of The Courage. Although it is the band's first album under their current name, the group has been playing as a back-up band for Noah Gundersen since 2007, who leads the group as the singer-songwriter. Gundersen dropped his name from the title after deciding to have the entire band more incorporated in the music and to move away from more folk-oriented music, saying, "I love the sound of a band more than a solo performer. You can only have so many options as a solo performer and I’m not a big fan of loop pedals." Since then, each member has played a more significant role in songwriting.

== Track listing ==
No.	Title	Length
1.	"Summer Sky"	4:03
2.	"Fearful Bone"	4:03
3.	"Frequency"	4:13
4.	"Hard Parts"	3:25
5.	"Chances"	4:53
6.	"451"	5:04
7.	"Black Dress"	5:38
8.	"Wandering Bird"	3:52
9.	"Wedding Song"	3:43
10.	"Moles"	6:00
11.	"East of Eden"	6:14

- "Moles" was initially released on Gundersen's MySpace on 10 December. The band performed a show at The Triple Door at the end of the month, selling the song as a single.
- "Frequency" was streamed for free on the band's official website weeks before the album's release.

== Personnel ==
- Noah Gundersen – guitar/vocals
- Abby Gundersen – violin/vocals
- Travis Ehrentrom – bass guitar
- Ivan Gunderson – drums
- Matt Lee – music producer/mixing
