= Ridgefield Playhouse =

Theater in Ridgefield, Connecticut, US

Coordinates: 41.2809°N 73.4939°W

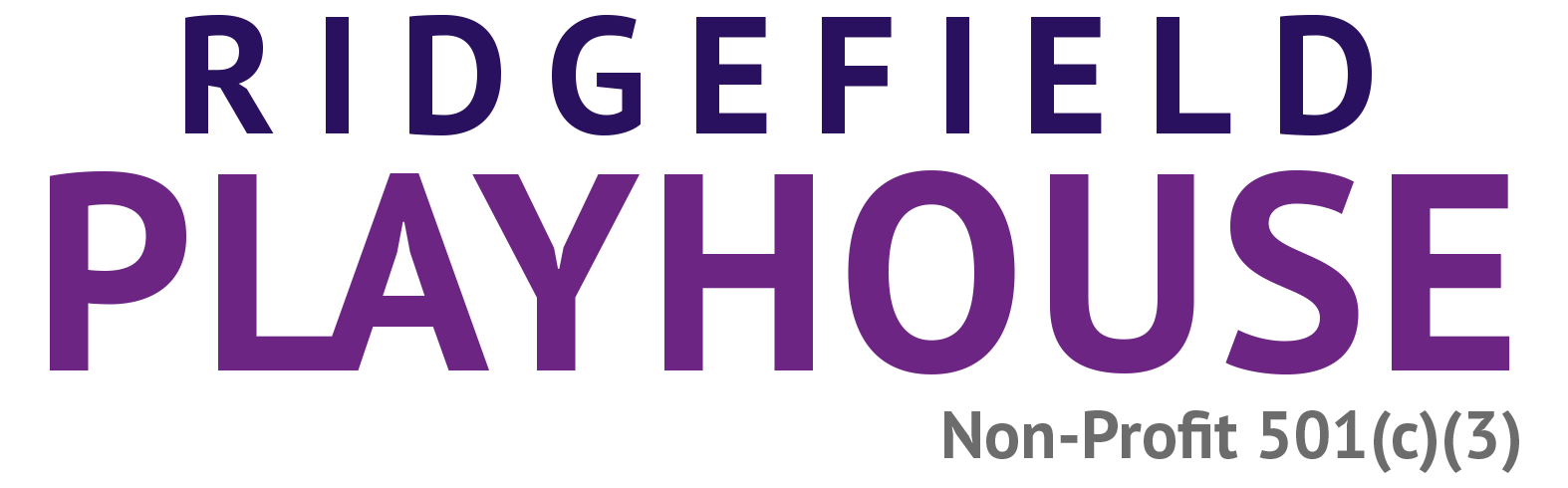
- Interactive map of Ridgefield Playhouse
- Address: 80 East Ridge Road; Ridgefield, Connecticut; United States
- Capacity: 500
- Type: Indoor theatre

Construction
- Opened: 1938
- Rebuilt: 2000
- Years active: 2000–present
- Architect: Cass Gilbert Jr.

Website
- http://www.ridgefieldplayhouse.org/

The Ridgefield Playhouse is a theater located in Ridgefield, Connecticut, with a capacity of 500. It hosts a variety of entertainment events such as the showing of films, plays and musical performances.

== History ==
The Ridgefield Playhouse was opened in December 2000 with a performance by guitarist Jose Feliciano. It was remodeled from the old Ridgefield High School's auditorium which was designed in the 1940s by Cass Gilbert Jr. He was the son of Cass Gilbert, architect of the Supreme Court Building and the Woolworth Building. When it was still the auditorium in the old high school, it was the place where school performances, community events and town meetings were held. During World War II, residents of Ridgefield could see Arturo Toscanini conduct there.
