= The Triple Door =

Music venue and restaurant in Seattle, Washington, U.S.

Coordinates: 47°36′31″N 122°20′15″W

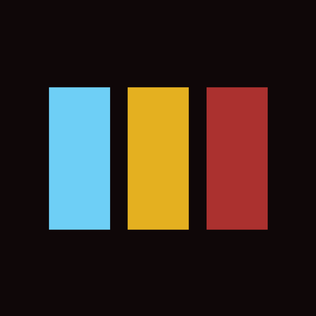
- Logo

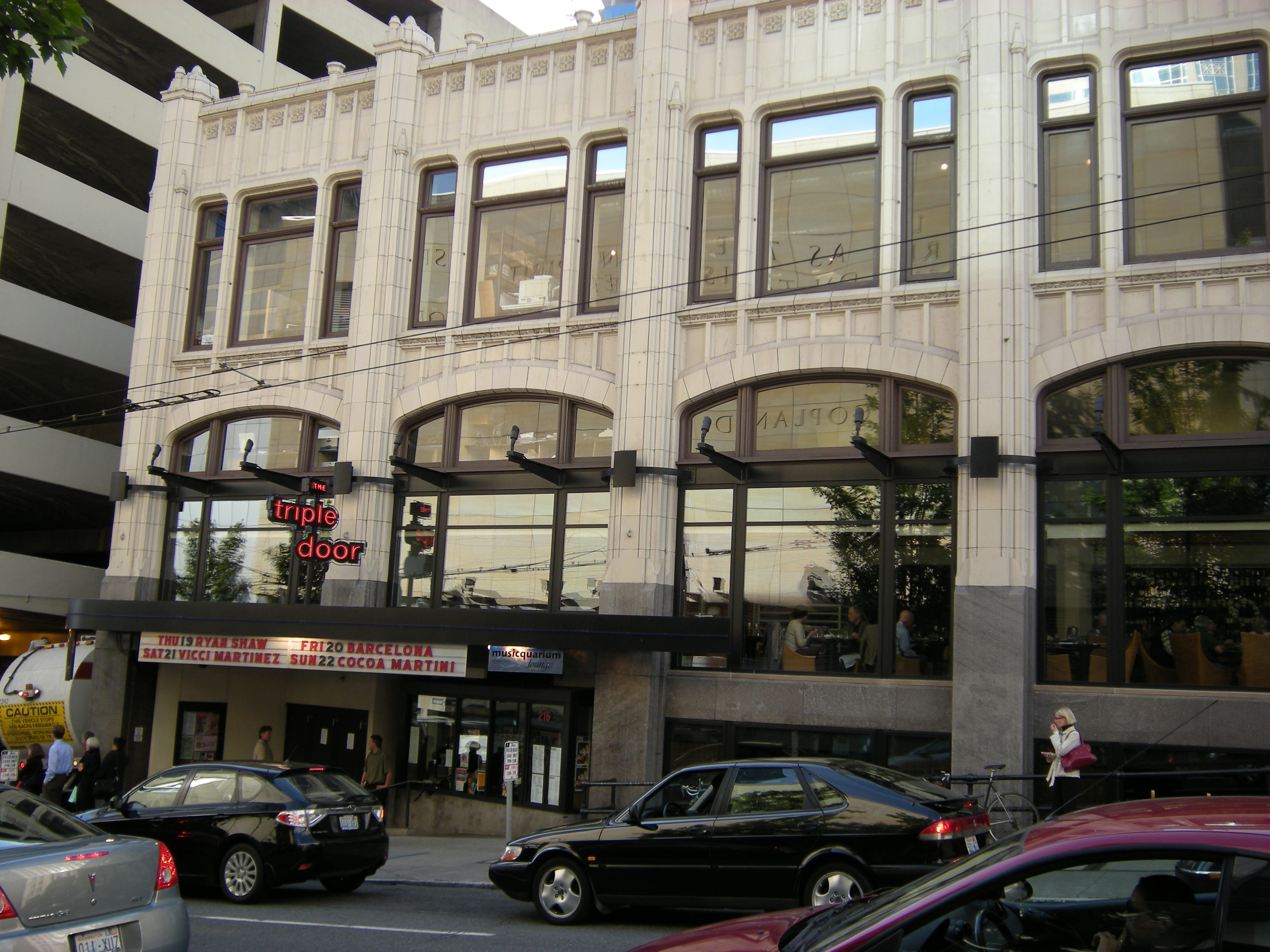
- The Triple Door, 2008
- Interactive map of The Triple Door
- Address: Seattle, Washington; United States
- Capacity: 250 (Mainstage); 50 (Musicquarium)

The Triple Door is a 250-300 seat dinner theater, lounge and music venue founded in the fall of 2003, located at 216 Union Street in Seattle, Washington. The building often hosts concerts for folk, indie, and World music groups. The Triple Door is also notable for the numerous effective fundraisers it has held such as the Starlight Starbright Children's Foundation and The Triple Door Young Artists Fundraiser. One fundraiser had an auction that raised around 1.15 million dollars for various children organizations.

== History ==
The Triple Door is located on Union Street in the Mann building, the former home of the Embassy Theatre which was established as a movie theater when it opened in 1925. The Embassy Theatre maintained its title as an A-list theatre well into the fifties but slowly lost popularity in the sixties. In 1984 the extremist group The Order set off a pipe bomb in the Embassy as a diversion for robbing an armored car at the Northgate Mall. The Embassy Theater closed in 1984. The building was bought in 1999 by Rick and Ann Yoder, and renovations to improve the quality of live performances began in the fall three years later. In September 2003, The Triple Door opened the doors to their first show where Skerik's Syncpated Taint Septet performed and recorded their live album (which was released 7 years later). The venue quickly rose in popularity and hosted shows for bands in the lounge (known as the "Musicquarium") such as Ottmar Liebert, The Courage, Natacha Atlas, Bassekou Kouyate, The Unthanks, Katie Herzig, Greg Dulli, Alyse Black, Edwin McCain, and El Vez.

== Recognition ==
The Triple Door has received awards for the quality of the lounge, wine, and performance from Pollstar, AOL, Seattle Weekly, Seattle Metropolitan, Outside Magazine, and National Geographic.
