= Chris Biscoe discography =

== See also ==
- Chris Biscoe

== Albums ==
- "Chris Biscoe Sextet" (Walking Wig)
- "Modern Alarms" (Walking Wig)
- "Profiles of Mingus" (Trio Records)
- "Music Is - Chris Biscoe Plays Mike Westbrook" (Trio Records)

== Other endeavors ==
as Full Monte:

- "The Saxophone Phenomenon" (Slam)
- Spark in the Dark (Slam)

with the NYJO:

- "NYJO" (1971; Philips)
- "NYJO" (1973; Charisma)

with Mike Westbrook:

- "The Paris Album" (Polydor)
- "Bright as Fire" (Impetus)
- The Cortège (Original Records, 1982)
- On Duke's Birthday (hat ART, 1985)
- "London Bridge is Broken Down" (Virgin/Venture)
- "The Orchestra of Smith's Academy" (Enja)
- "Bar Utopia" (ASC)
- "Glad Day" (Enja)
- "Chanson Irresponsable" (Enja)
- "Art Wolf" (Altrisuoni) (a quartet with Pete Whyman, Chris Biscoe & Kate & Mike Westbrook)

with The Westbrook Trio: (also known as "A Little Westbrook Music" with Kate Westbrook, Mike Westbrook, Chris Biscoe

- "A Little Westbrook Music" (Westbrook Records)
- "Love for Sale" (hat ART)
- "The Lift" (Voiceprint)

with Grand Union Orchestra:

- "The Song of Many Tongues" (RedGold Records, 1986)
- "Freedom Calls" (RedGold Records, 1989)
- "The Rhythm of Tides" (RedGold Records, 1997)
- "Now Comes The Dragon's Hour" (RedGold Records, 2002)
- "12 For 12" (RedGold Records, 2011)

with The Dedication Orchestra:

- "Spirits Rejoice" (Ogun)
- "Ixesha" (Ogun)

with Ken Hyder:

- "Under the Influence" (Konnex)

with the Pete Hurt Orchestra:

- "Lost For Words" (Spotlight)

with John Williams:

- "Baritone Band" (Spotlight)

with the Didier Levallet Quintet:

- "Quiet Days" (Evidence)
- "Generations" (Evidence)

with Chris McGregor's Brotherhood of Breath:

- "Country Cooking" (Virgin/Venture)

with the Grand Union Orchestra:

- "Freedom Calls" (Redgold)
- "Rhythm of Tides" (Redgold)

with Ben Davis:

- "Double Dares are Sometimes Different" (FMR)

with Kate Westbrook & The Skirmishers:

- "Cuff Clout" (Voiceprint)

with Andy Sheppard:

- "Soft on the Inside" (Antilles)

with the George Russell Living Time Orchestra:

- The London Concert (Label Bleu)
- It's About Time (Label Bleu)

with Graham Collier:

- "Charles River Fragments" (Boathouse)

with Josefina Cupido:

- "One Woman, One Drum" (Sound & Language)

with the Orchestre National de Jazz:

- "ONJ Express" (Evidence)
- "Passages" (Evidence)
- "Deep Feelings" (Evidence)

with Harry Beckett:

- "A Tribute to Charles Mingus" (West Wind)
- "Before and After" (Jazzprint)

with the Liam Noble Group:

- "In The Meantime " (Basho)

with RedBrass:

- "Silence Is Consent" (Riverside Recordings, 1976)
