= Brian Godding =

Welsh guitarist (1945–2023)

- Born: 19 August 1945; Monmouth, Monmouthshire, Wales
- Died: 25 November 2023 (aged 78)
- Genres: Pop music, rock, jazz rock
- Occupations: Musician, session musician, composer
- Instrument: Guitar
- Years active: 1964–2023
- Formerly of: The Grave Diggers, The Ingoes, Blossom Toes, B. B. Blunder, Solid Gold Cadillac, Kevin Coyne, Magma, Mike Westbrook Orchestra, Centipede
- Website: lotsawatts.co.uk

Audio sample
- "Blue Sun" from Slaughter on Shaftesbury Avenue: file; help

Brian Godding (19 August 1945 – 25 November 2023) was a Welsh pop, rock and jazz rock guitarist. He was a founding member of the psychedelic rock band Blossom Toes and was also a member of the jazz rock big band Centipede.

== Biography ==
Godding was born on 19 August 1945 in Monmouth, Monmouthshire, South Wales. He died on 25 November 2023, at the age of 78. He was a brother-in-law of English singer and actress Julie Driscoll.

== Work ==
In the early 1980s Godding contributed to three albums by Kevin Coyne: Bursting Bubbles (1980), Sanity Stomp (1980) and Pointing the Finger (1981).

Regarding his 1988 solo album Slaughter on Shaftesbury Avenue, Dave Wayne in the New Gibraltar Encyclopedia of Progressive Rock, said:

Intense jazz-rock fusion of the highest quality. Godding's guitar playing should please fans of McLaughlin and Holdsworth to no end. Heartily recommended to all fusion fans.

Reviewing the same album for the Dorset Echo, Marco Rossi said:

Fans of Allan Holdsworth, John Etheridge and John McLaughlin had best be sitting down with a fortifying cuppa when they hear, by way of example, "Blue Sun" from Godding's 1988 album Slaughter on Shaftesbury Avenue - a warm-toned, hugely imaginative and wholly involving sound picture on which Godding conjures forth such a powerfully hypnotic extended intro that I actually jumped out of my seat when the drums came in.

Godding was featured in 'Crossing Bridges', a 1983 music programme based around jazz guitar improvisation, and broadcast by Channel 4.

Writing for dmme.net after his death in 2023, H.-Peter Pfeufer said:

Universally praised as a jazz player, Brian Godding, who passed away on November 25th at the age of 78, has always been, in fact, held in high esteem as half of a musical unit that influenced most of the classic rock twin-guitar pairs, a part, together with Jim Cregan, of the legendary BLOSSOM TOES. Their two albums, 1967's We Are Ever So Clean and If Only for a Moment from 1969, both overseen by Giorgio Gomelsky, are considered cult treasures now, but Brian felt his horizons were limited by what the band did, and a one-off gig with Julie Driscoll in 1969 presented Godding with a chance to move forward and expand his outlook in more than one way, thus targeting genuine greatness.

== Discography ==
=== As leader ===
- Slaughter on Shaftesbury Avenue (Reckless Records: RECK16, 1988)

=== As sideman ===
With Blossom Toes

- We Are Ever So Clean (Marmalade, 1967)
- If Only for a Moment (Marmalade, 1969)

With Centipede

- Septober Energy, (Neon: NE 9, 1971)

With Full Monte

- Spark In The Dark (Slam, 2013)

With Magma

- Köhntarkösz (Vertigo, A&M, Seventh Day, 1974)

With Kevin Coyne

- Bursting Bubbles (Virgin Records, 1980)
- Sanity Stomp (Virgin Records, 1980)
- Pointing the Finger (Cherry Red Records, 1981)

With Mike Westbrook

- Citadel/Room 315 (RCA, 1975)
- Love/Dream And Variations (Transatlantic, 1976)
- The Cortège (Original Records, 1982)
- On Duke's Birthday (Hat ART, 1985)
- Pierides (Jazzprint, 1986)
- The Dance Band (Core, 1987)
- London Bridge Is Broken Down (Virgin Venture, 1988)

With Mirage

- Now You See It (Compendium, 1977)
