= Robert Coyne =

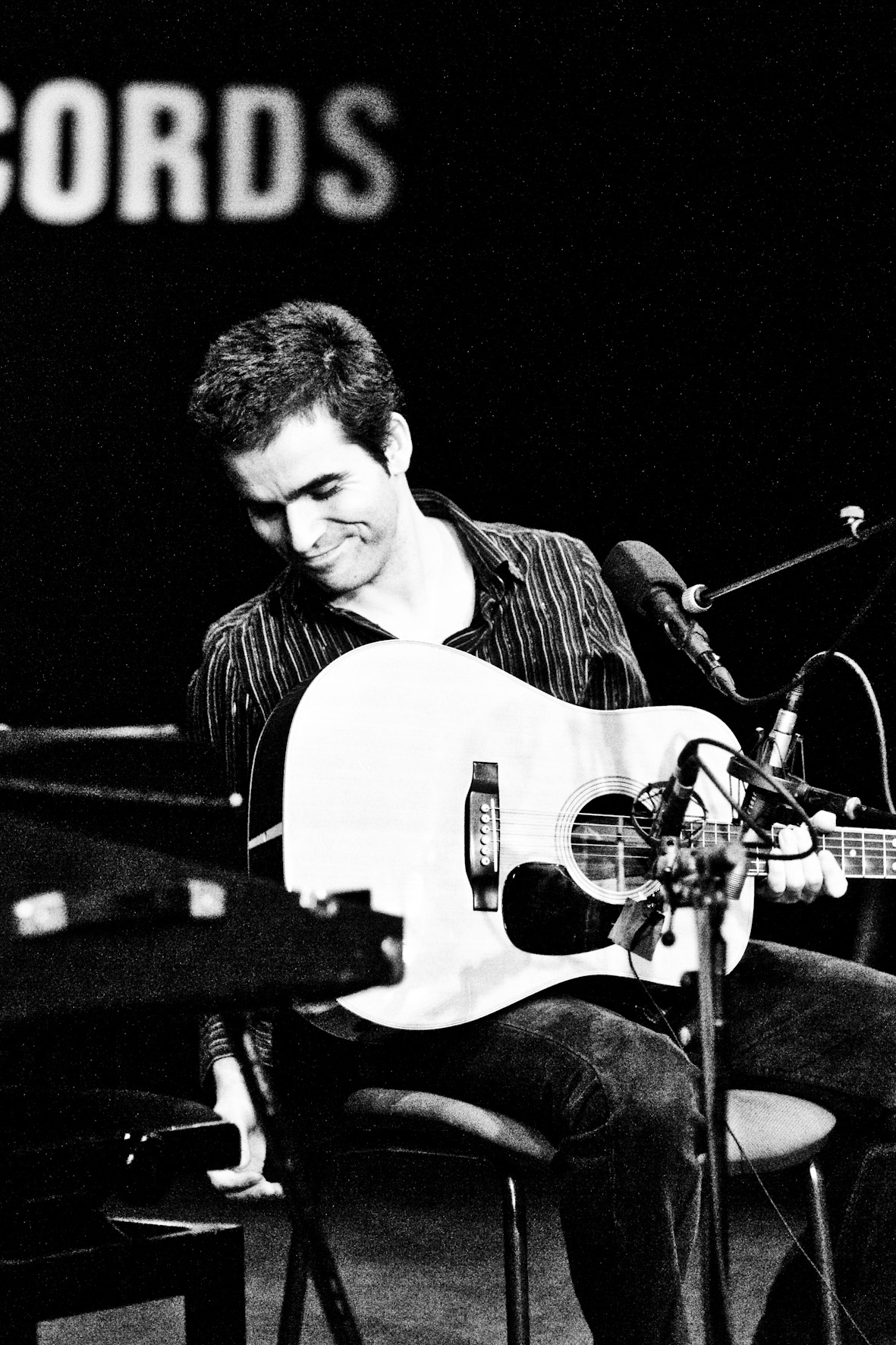
- Coyne performing at Theater Der Keller, Cologne, 2010

Background information
- Born: Whittingham, Preston, Lancashire, England
- Genres: Alternative folk, rock
- Occupations: Musician, composer, singer
- Instruments: Vocals, guitar
- Years active: 1993–present
- Labels: Meyer Records, Turpentine Records, Red Star Digital
- Website: Official website
- Family: Kevin Coyne (father)

Robert Coyne (born 1969) is a British alternative folk musician and singer-songwriter. He plays guitar, bass, keyboards, drums and sings.

Coyne is the son of the musician, painter and author Kevin Coyne, who died in 2004. In Germany Robert and his vocalist brother Eugene, the sons of Coyne's first marriage, appeared on some of their father's recordings including Tough And Sweet (1993) and Sugar Candy Taxi (1999). As a guitarist and multi-instrumentalist, Robert eventually joined his father's band and contributed to several further albums, including Room Full of Fools (2000), Carnival (2002), Donut City (2004) and One Day In Chicago (2005, with Jon Langford and the Pine Valley Cosmonauts).

Coyne has also worked as a musician with Eric Burdon, The Barracudas, The Scientists, Amy Rigby, Spooky Tooth, Sky Saxon and Chris Wilson of the Flamin' Groovies.

In 2006 Coyne provided the soundtrack for the Edinburgh Film Festival-winning documentary feature The Great Happiness Space, and in 2007 released his first solo album Death Is Not My Destiny, on which he sang for the first time. The following year, he founded "The Robert Coyne Outfit" to present his music on stage.

In 2010 Coyne released the album Woodland Conspiracy, accompanied only by his guitar and on some tracks by a Fender Rhodes piano.

With Jaki Liebezeit, formerly the drummer of the avant-garde band Can, he recorded the album The Obscure Department in 2013. Two more albums with Liebezeit, Golden Arc (2014) and I Still Have This Dream (2016), followed. Last Lion, another solo album, was also released in 2016.

Drawings by Coyne, drawn when he was aged about 10, feature on the cover of his father's 1980 album Sanity Stomp. He has also drawn the artwork for the covers of several of his own releases.

== Discography ==
- Death Is Not My Destiny (2007), Turpentine Records
- Woodland Conspiracy (2010), Meyer Records
- Soft Tread of the Future, (2012), Red Star Digital
- The Obscure Department (2013, with Jaki Liebezeit), Meyer Records
- Golden Arc (2014, with Jaki Liebezeit), Meyer Records
- Memory Deluxe: I Knew Buffalo Bill 2 (2014, with Jeremy Gluck), Flicknife Records
- I Still Have This Dream (2016, with Jaki Liebezeit), Meyer Records
- Last Lion (2016), Turpentine Records
