= We Are Ever So Clean =

Studio album by Blossom Toes
- Released: 24 November 1967
- Genre: Psychedelic rock; acid rock
- Length: 39:56
- Label: Marmalade
- Producer: Giorgio Gomelsky

Blossom Toes chronology
We Are Ever So Clean (1967)	If Only for a Moment (1969)

Singles from We Are Ever So Clean
- 1. "What on Earth / Mrs. Murphy's Budgerigar / Look at Me I'm You" Released: October 1967

Professional ratings
Review scores
Source	Rating
Allmusic	4.5/5 stars

We Are Ever So Clean is the debut album by Blossom Toes, released in 1967 on Marmalade Records. The album was reissued in 2007 by Sunbeam Records along with bonus tracks.

It is listed in Record Collector’s "100 Greatest Psychedelic Records". Richie Unterberger calls the album "One of the happiest, most underappreciated relics of British psychedelia."

== Track listing ==
Side A
No.	Title	Writer(s)	Length
1.	"Look at Me I'm You"	Godding, Gomelsky	3:55
2.	"I'll Be Late for Tea"	Godding	2:42
3.	"The Remarkable Saga of the Frozen Dog"	Westlake	3:02
4.	"Telegram Tuesday"	Godding	2:38
5.	"Love Is"	Godding	2:41
6.	"What's It For"	Cregan	3:03
7.	"People of the Royal Parks"	Westlake	2:20

Side B
No.	Title	Writer(s)	Length
8.	"What on Earth"	Godding	2:53
9.	"Mrs. Murphy's Budgerigar"	Cregan, Westlake	2:38
10.	"I Will Bring You This and That"	Godding	2:55
11.	"Mister Watchmaker"	Godding	2:22
12.	"When the Alarm Clock Rings"	Cregan	2:26
13.	"The Intrepid Balloonist's Handbook, Volume One"	Cregan	2:12
14.	"You"	Godding	2:45
15.	"Track for Speedy Freaks (or Instant LP Digest)"	Godding, Gomelsky, Cregan, Westlake	1:25

Bonus tracks (2007 reissue)
No.	Title	Length
16.	"Everybody’s Talking" (Outtake)	2:32
17.	"Look At Me I’m You" (Instrumental)	3:47
18.	"I’ll Be Late for Tea" (Mono Mix without Overdubs)	2:28
19.	"Mister Watchmaker" (Live)	3:08
20.	"I’ll Be Your Baby Tonight"	3:23
21.	"Jim Cregan interview"	0:57
22.	"Love Is" (Live)	3:01
23.	"Collects Little Girls" (Demo)	4:03
24.	"Hometime" (Demo)	3:44
25.	"Looking Up I'm Looking Back" (Demo)	3:03

== Personnel ==
- Brian Belshaw - bass, vocals
- Jim Cregan - guitar, vocals
- Brian Godding - guitar, keyboards, vocals
- Kevin Westlake - drums
- David Whittaker - orchestration
- Poli Palmer - percussion, vibes (bonus tracks 22–25)
