= There She Goes =

There She Goes may refer to:

- There She Goes (TV series), a British television series
- "There She Goes" (Babyface song), 2001
- "There She Goes" (Taio Cruz song), 2012
- "There She Goes" (The La's song), 1988
- "There She Goes", a 2010 song by Good Charlotte from Cardiology
- "There She Goes", a 1981 song by Kevin Coyne from Pointing the Finger
- "There She Goes", a 1955 song and single by Carl Smith
- "There She Goes", a 2024 song by Benson Boone from Fireworks & Rollerblades

== See also ==
- "There She Go" (PnB Rock song) (2017)
- "There She Go" (Fetty Wap song) (2017)
- "There She Goes Again", a song by The Velvet Underground (1967)
- "There She Goes Again" (Marshall Crenshaw song) (1982)
