= If Only for a Moment =

Studio album by Blossom Toes
- Released: July 1969
- Genres: Psychedelic rock; progressive rock
- Length: 43:51
- Label: Marmalade
- Producers: Blossom Toes; Giorgio Gomelsky

Blossom Toes chronology
We Are Ever So Clean (1967)	If Only for a Moment (1969)

Singles from If Only For A Moment
- 1. "Peace Loving Man"/"Above My Hobby Horses Head" Released: April 1969

Professional ratings
Review scores
Source	Rating
Allmusic	4/5 stars

If Only for a Moment is the second and final album by Blossom Toes, released in 1969 on Marmalade Records. The album was reissued in 2007 by Sunbeam Records along with bonus tracks.

== Track listing ==
Side A
No.	Title	Writer(s)	Length
1.	"Peace Loving Man"	Godding	4:52
2.	"Kiss of Confusion"	Godding	4:45
3.	"Listen to the Silence"	Cregan	4:50
4.	"Love Bomb"	Godding	7:39

Side B
No.	Title	Writer(s)	Length
5.	"Billy Boo the Gunman"	Godding	7:08
6.	"Indian Summer"	Cregan	5:55
7.	"Just Above My Hobby Horse’s Head"	Havens	2:53
8.	"Wait A Minute"	Cregan	5:49

Bonus tracks (2007 reissue)
No.	Title	Length
9.	"Postcard"	2:55
10.	"Everyone’s Leaving Me Now"	4:45
11.	"Ever Since a Memory" (Demo)	4:25
12.	"Nobody But" (Demo)	4:03
13.	"Peace Loving Man" (Demo)	6:29
14.	"Listen to the Silence" (Live)	3:58
15.	"New Day" (Demo)	5:16

== Personnel ==
- Jim Cregan – lead and rhythm guitars, lead vocals (3, 6, 8)
- Brian Godding – lead and rhythm guitars, lead vocals (2, 4, 5), organ, piano
- "Big" Brian Belshaw – bass, lead vocals (1, 7)
- Barry Reeves – drums (all but 1), percussion, congas (1)
- John "Poli" Palmer – drums (1)
- Shawn Phillips – 12-string acoustic guitar (7), sitar (7)
- Giorgio Gomelsky – backing vocals (4)
- Paragon Publicity – design (sleeve design)
- Blossom Toes, Giorgio Gomelsky – producer
- Reggie King – producer (assistant)
