= Gary Farr =

British folk/blues singer (1944–1994)

- Born: 19 October 1944; Worthing, Sussex, England
- Died: 29 July 1994 (aged 49) Los Angeles, California, U.S.
- Genres: R&B, rock
- Years active: 1960s–1980s
- Labels: Columbia, Marmalade, CBS, ATCO, A&M

Gary Anthony Farr (19 October 1944 – 29 July 1994) was a British folk/blues singer best known as the founder and lead vocalist of the T-Bones, a British rhythm and blues band active primarily in the early to mid-1960s. After the break-up of the T-Bones, Farr pursued a solo career that resulted in three studio albums and a handful of singles, none of which were commercially well received. Later he collaborated with other musicians (some of whom had been members of the British band Uriah Heep) and released one album under the name Lion. Following this project, Farr made no more official music recordings.

== Early life ==
Farr was born the third child of Tommy Farr (a famous Welsh champion heavyweight boxer) and Muriel Montgomery Germon, in Worthing, Sussex, England. He was the youngest among his siblings, sister Rosalind A. Germon (born June 1941, Hove, Sussex) and brother Thomas Rikki Germon (known better as rock music promoter Rikki Farr (born 30 September 1942, Hove, Sussex). Growing up, Gary developed a love of blues and folk music, which influenced his eventual musical career.

== With the T-Bones ==
Farr began playing with the T-Bones around Sussex in 1963, as part of the British rhythm and blues scene, and eventually gaining enough of a local reputation to inherit the Yardbirds' Friday night slot at the famous Marquee Club in London, as well as establishing themselves at the Crawdaddy Club. In 1965, Gary Farr and the T-Bones recorded an EP titled Dem Bones Dem Bones Dem T-Bones, released in the UK by Columbia and produced by Giorgio Gomelsky. The group released some additional singles around the same time as the EP. None of the T-Bones' work landed on the UK charts, but the band managed to secure an appearance on the American television program Shindig Goes to London in August 1965, where they performed a cover of "Wooly Bully" alongside more famous groups such as The Moody Blues and The Animals. Following the television appearance, the T-Bones' drummer, Brian "Legs" Walkley, met and jammed with organist Keith Emerson (who would go on to fame with The Nice and Emerson, Lake & Palmer), which resulted in Emerson joining the band in its final days. They recorded a single titled "Together Forever" with Emerson, but the song was never released, as the T-Bones proceeded to break up shortly after that in 1967.

== Solo career ==
Farr's career slowed down after the demise of The T-Bones, but by May 1968 he had released one single, "Everyday" b/w "Green," with fellow artist Kevin Westlake. By 1969, Farr had begun to establish his career as a singer-songwriter; he began writing his material, mostly of an acoustic-folk style, rather than the blues and R&B that characterised his years with The T-Bones. His first release was the album Take Something With You (Marmalade), featuring British group Mighty Baby as his session musicians. "Green" ended up appearing on the album. Along with the full-length album, he recorded a single, "Hey Daddy" (a non-album track). In August of the same year he appeared at the Isle of Wight Festival 1969.

In 1970, Farr recorded his second solo effort, Strange Fruit (CBS), which again featured members of Mighty Baby, as well as Richard Thompson. A UK single on CBS was released from the album which was called "Revolution of the Season" / "Old Man Boulder" with catalogue number S5430. His live performances were mainly limited to low-key folk music clubs, but due to his familial connection to promoter Rikki Farr, he was able to perform at the Isle of Wight Festival 1970, of which Rikki was the promoter.

Still having no real success in his solo career, Farr was out of the music scene until 1973, when he recorded his third and final solo record, Addressed to the Censors of Love (ATCO). This album was the only one of his to be recorded in the United States and was produced by Jerry Wexler. One single, "Mexican Sun," was released from the album; the A-side was a stereo version of the track, and the B-side a mono version. Neither the single nor the album was a commercial success. Farr's career once again ground to a halt.

== Lion ==
In 1980, Farr was back in the studio, this time accompanied by other musicians including Robin Le Mesurier and John Sinclair of Uriah Heep. Performing under the name Lion, Farr was in a band setting for the first time since the T-Bones broke up. One album was recorded and released by A&M Records under the Lion name: Running All Night. After this project failed to garner any attention, Farr retreated from the music business and moved to the United States.

== Later life ==
Toward the end of his life, Farr took up carpentry and continued writing and playing music on the side. He enjoyed bicycling as a hobby; after a particularly strenuous outing on his bicycle, he suffered a heart attack in Los Angeles, which resulted in his death, the exact date of which is unclear. One source reports the date as 29 July 1994, while another states 1 August 1994.
