= Hartburn =

Hartburn can refer to:

== Places ==
- Hartburn, County Durham, a suburb of Stockton-on-Tees in County Durham, England
- Hartburn, East Riding of Yorkshire, a deserted village in the civil parish of Barmston, East Riding of Yorkshire, England
- Hartburn, Northumberland, a village in Northumberland, England

== People ==
- Johnny Hartburn (1920-2001), English footballer

== See also ==
- Heartburn (disambiguation)
