= Case history =

Case history may refer to:

- Medical history of a patient
- Case Histories, 2004 novel by Kate Atkinson
- Case Histories (TV series), based on the novel
- Case Histories (album) (1989), by Pain Teens
- Case History (album) (1972), by Kevin Coyne
