= Kate Westbrook =

Kate Westbrook may refer to:

- Kate Westbrook (musician) (born 1939), singer/songwriter
- Kate Westbrook, pseudonym for Samantha Weinberg, author of The Moneypenny Diaries series
