= Danilo Terenzi =

- Born: Danilo Terenzi; 2 March 1956
- Origin: Rome, Italy
- Died: 4 May 1995 (aged 39)
- Genres: Jazz
- Instrument: Trombone

Danilo Terenzi (2 March 1956 – 4 May 1995) was an Italian jazz trombonist and composer born in Rome, Italy, perhaps best known for his big band work with Giorgio Gaslini. Terenzi had also recorded with several other artists, including Mike Westbrook and Chris Biscoe.

From 1969 to 1975 Terenzi studied the trombone at the Santa Cecilia Conservatory in Rome. He had also worked with many well-known names in jazz music, including Archie Shepp, Roswell Rudd, Enrico Rava, Paul Rutherford, Albert Mangelsdorff, Mel Lewis and Steve Lacy. On the Mike Westbrook album "The Orchestra Of Smith's Academy" (Enja; 1998), the Steve Martland band performed a Westbrook tribute to Danilo titled "Blues For Terenzi".

== Select discography ==
- Laboratorio Della Quercia (Horo)

With Riccardo Fassi

- Out Of Phase (Phrases)

Mike Westbrook

- On Duke's Birthday (hat Art)
