= Marjory Razorblade =

Studio album by Kevin Coyne
- Released: October 1973
- Studio: The Manor, Oxfordshire, Blue Horizon Studio, Chipping Norton, Saturn Studios, Worthing, Sussex
- Genre: Rock
- Length: 78:40
- Label: Virgin VD 2501
- Producer: Steve Verroca

Kevin Coyne chronology
Case History (1972)	Marjory Razorblade (1973)	Blame lt On The Night (1974)

Singles from Marjory Razorblade
- 1. "Marlene" Released: 1973 (UK), 1974 (Australia); 2. "Marlene / Jackie And Edna" Released: 1973 (France); 3. "Marlene / Sea of Love" Released: 1973 (Netherlands, Germany); 4. "Lovesick Fool" Released: 1973 (UK)

Marjory Razorblade is a double-LP by English rock singer Kevin Coyne and was one of the earliest releases on Virgin Records, which had launched four months earlier in June 1973. The double album includes the song "Marlene", which was issued as a single, and "Eastbourne Ladies", which was featured among the selection of tracks played by John Lydon (aka Johnny Rotten) at the height of the Sex Pistols notoriety on the Capital Radio show A Punk & His Music, broadcast in London in the summer of 1977.

== Cover artwork ==
The gatefold album sleeve was designed by photographer Phil Franks who was commissioned by Virgin Records. A long time friend and collaborator of prominent graphic artist Barney Bubbles, Franks asked Bubbles to do the layout of the sleeve, and lettering, to show his photographs as he himself printed them, i.e.: without cropping and within black borders. Bubbles also designed the distinctive logo carrying the album title and artist name, though was content not to receive a credit himself.

== Other releases ==
The record was also released, as a single LP, in the US (Virgin VR 13–106) with a truncated track listing of: "Eastbourne Ladies", "Old Soldier", "Marlene", "Everybody Says", "Lovesick Fool", "House On The Hill", "Nasty", "Talking To No One", "Dog Latin", "I Want My Crown" and "Marjory Razorblade".

In 2010 the album was re-released in Europe by Virgin and EMI, as a double CD, (Virgin VDR 2501, EMI VDR 2501), with 24-bit digital remastering at The Audio Archiving Company and with 16 bonus tracks.

== Reception ==
Professional ratings
Review scores
Source	Rating
AllMusic	4.5/5 stars
Christgau's Record Guide	B+
Classic Rock	9/10 stars
Tom Hull	B+

Robert Christgau wrote, "Another British eccentric with a voice scratchy and wavery enough to make Mick Jagger sound like Anthony Newley, only this one can write songs. The annoying kid-stuff tone of the perversity here purveyed is redeemed by the fact that there isn't a chance it will sell, not even with the Brit double-LP condensed down to one. Also, 'House on the Hill' is as convincing a madman's song as I know."

Reviewing the album for the BBC in 2010, Mike Diver described the album as "a synthesis of individual ability into one effective, enchanting end product."

== Track listing ==
All tracks composed by Kevin Coyne except where indicated.

Side 1

1. "Marjory Razorblade" – 1:42
2. "Marlene" – 2:37
3. "Talking to No One" – 2:25
4. "Eastbourne Ladies" – 5:43
5. "Old Soldier" – 3:45

Side 2

6. "I Want My Crown" (traditional) – 4:10
7. "Nasty" – 4:45
8. "Lonesome Valley" (A. P. Carter) – 3:45
9. "House on the Hill" – 4:53
10. "Cheat Me" - 3:45

Side 3

11. "Jackie and Edna" – 4:05
12. "Everybody Says" – 4:24
13. "Mummy" – 4:10
14. "Heaven in My View" (A. P. Carter) – 3:16
15. "Karate King" – 3:18

Side 4

16. "Dog Latin" – 4:55
17. "This Is Spain" – 2:10
18. "Chairman's Ball" – 3:15
19. "Good Boy" – 2:38
20. "Chicken Wing" – 4:23

== Personnel ==
=== Musicians ===
- Kevin Coyne – vocals, guitar
- Gordon Smith – guitar, mandolin
- Dave Clague – guitar, acoustic guitar
- Jean Roussel – piano, keyboards
- Tony Cousins – bass, tuba
- Chili Charles – drums, congas
- Steve Verroca – acoustic case and piano
- Malcom Healey – synthesizer
- Ed DeGenaro – guitar

=== Technical ===
- Steve Verroca – producer
- Tom Newman, Phil Newell – engineers
- Simon Heyworth – mixing
- Alan Corbeth – mastering
- Barney Bubbles – sleeve artwork and logo
- Phil Franks – Design/Photography
