= Politicz =

Studio album by Kevin Coyne
- Released: 1982
- Genre: Rock; experimental
- Label: Cherry Red
- Producer: Kevin Coyne; Peter Kirtley; Steve Bull

Kevin Coyne chronology
Live in Berlin (1981)	Politicz (1982)	Beautiful Extremes et cetera (1983)

Song sample
- 28 seconds of "Banzai": file; help

Politicz is a studio album by the British rock artist Kevin Coyne which was released in 1982 on the Cherry Red label.

== Reception ==
AllMusic's reviewer Dean McFarlane awarded the album 3 stars and said, "One of the British singer/songwriter's more outwardly experimental records, this album contains some of his most intimate work, deeply personal songs and techniques which were taking him further and further away from tradition."

In 2012 Record Collector, reviewing Coyne's career, said, "Coyne hooked up with Alan Hull's guitarist Pete Kirtley and synth player Steve Bull for Politicz, a charmingly schizoid half-acoustic, half-synthetic album. But Coyne was on a downhill slide.".

Pascal Regis, reviewing the album, said, "Another good example of the way Coyne used the talents of his sidemen. Steve Bull offered him some rough synthesiser demos which Coyne seized on. Refusing to re-record them, he improvised lyrics on top and released the result intact. ... Coyne is at the peak of his art. "Banzai" and "Tell The Truth" are harrowing plunges into the world of madness over heady techno loops. "I've Got The Photographs" and "Flashing Back" are examples of precious - and all too rare - acoustic moments in the Coyne oeuvre."

== Track listing ==
All tracks are written by Kevin Coyne and Peter Kirtley

Side one
No.	Title	Length
1.	"Your Holiness"	3:09
2.	"Liberation"	4.13
3.	"Fun Flesh"	6:51
4.	"Flashing Back"	3:28

All tracks are written by Kevin Coyne and Steve Bull

Side two
No.	Title	Length
5.	"Tell the Truth"	4:04
6.	"Banzai"	4:28
7.	"Poisoning You"	4:02
8.	"Magnolia Street"	3:45
9.	"I've Got the Photographs"	2:54

== Personnel ==
=== Musicians ===
- Steve Bull – synthesizer
- Peter Kirtley – guitars
- Kevin Coyne – vocals
- Jim Woodland – backing vocals on "Tell The Truth"

=== Production personnel ===
- Producers: Kevin Coyne, Peter Kirtley and Steve Bull at Chestnut Studios, Farnham
- Engineer: Mike Gregovich
- Cover artwork: James Wolf
