= Westbrook-Rossini, Zürich Live 1986 =

Live album by Mike Westbrook
- Released: 1994
- Recorded: November 9, 1986
- Venue: International Jazz Festival, Zürich, Switzerland
- Genre: Jazz
- Length: 83:55
- Label: hat ART hat ART CD 2-6152
- Producer: Pia Uehlinger, Werner X. Uehlinger

Mike Westbrook chronology
Pier Rides (1986)	Westbrook-Rossini, Zürich Live 1986 (1994)	Westbrook-Rossini (1987)

Westbrook-Rossini, Zürich Live 1986 is a live album by Mike Westbrook, featuring interpretations of works by Gioachino Rossini which was recorded in Switzerland in 1986 and first released on the hat ART label in 1996.

== Reception ==
Professional ratings
Review scores
Source	Rating
Allmusic	4.5/5 stars

The Allmusic review by Thom Jurek stated "Hearing the fine studio recording of Westbrook's magnum opus Rossini made for some trepidation at the prospect of a live recording of the work. ... The result is staggering. Whatever little is lost in the recording quality due to the unpredictability of live dynamics is more than compensated for in a performance so dramatic, swinging, and joyful it is breathtaking. ... Live, it's even tougher to grasp because there is no safety net, no alternate takes or editing to round out the rough spots. It's all one can do to take it in and not roll about the floor with your hands over your head, tears streaming in such blessed out delight you will cause your loved ones unnecessary worry. You'll listen for decades and still not comprehend the wonder if it. Yes, it is that good".

== Track listing ==
All compositions by Gioachino Rossini with additional material by Mike Westbrook

1. William Tell Overture II – 5:53
2. William Tell Overture III – 2:10
3. The Thieving Magpie Overture – 3:24
4. L' Amoroso E Sincero Lindoro – 20:40
5. William Tell Overture IV – 4:05
6. The Barber of Seville Overture – 9:23
7. Thiev-ish Magpie – 9:01
8. William Tell Overture I – 4:43
9. Si Cinge Il Pro'Guerriero – 4:49
10. Isaura – 12:45
11. Tutto Cangia – 3:12
12. William Tell Overture V – 3:50

== Personnel ==
- Mike Westbrook – piano, tuba
- Kate Westbrook – tenor horn, piccolo, voice
- Paul Nieman – trombone
- Andy Grappy – tuba
- Lindsay Cooper – sopranino saxophone
- Peter Whyman – alto saxophone
- Peter Fairclough – drums
