= Blossom Toes =

British psychedelic pop band (1966–1970)

- Origin: London, England
- Genres: Psychedelic pop; psychedelic rock; baroque pop; hard rock; British beat; British R&B; freakbeat
- Years active: 1966–1970
- Label: Marmalade (Polydor)
- Past members: Brian Godding; Jim Cregan; Brian Belshaw; Kevin Westlake; John "Poli" Palmer; Barry Reeves
- Website: blossomtoes.co.uk

Blossom Toes were a British psychedelic pop band active between 1966 and 1970. They were initially known as The Ingoes and played beat music, freakbeat, R&B, and soul covers. They were then renamed and signed to the Marmalade record label of manager Giorgio Gomelsky. The original line-up comprised Brian Godding (19 August 1945 – 26 November 2023, Monmouth, South Wales) (guitar, vocals, keyboards), Jim Cregan (born James Cregan, 9 March 1946, Yeovil, Somerset) (guitar, vocals), Brian Belshaw (born 25 February 1944 – 3 February 2016, Wigan, Lancashire) (bass, vocals), and Kevin Westlake (born Kevin Patrick Westlake, 5 March 1947 – 30 September 2004, Dublin, County Dublin, Ireland) (drums).

The band's debut album, We Are Ever So Clean, was issued on 3 November 1967 It was included in Record Collector's list of the "100 Greatest Psychedelic Records".

If Only For A Moment saw the band taking a noticeably heavier direction, with Cregan and Godding's distinctive two-part guitar harmonies playing a prominent role. At this point Westlake left, and was replaced by John "Poli" Palmer (25 May 1943 – 21 July 2025, Evesham, Worcestershire), and then Barry Reeves (15 July 1944 – 6 February 2010, Birmingham, West Midlands).

The band quit in 1970. Belshaw and Godding rejoined Westlake in B.B. Blunder, Cregan formed Stud with John Wilson and Charlie McCracken, before joining Family, as did Palmer.

The Blossom Toes contributed music to La Collectionneuse (1967), a film by French director Éric Rohmer, and also appeared in "Popdown" (1967) by Fred Marshall.

== Discography ==
=== Albums ===
- We Are Ever So Clean (Album - November 1967, Marmalade 607001 (mono) 608001 (stereo); re-releases include: 2007 Sunbeam Records CD SBRCD5035; 2022 Esoteric Recordings w/ much additional material)
- If Only for a Moment (Album - July 1969, Marmalade 608010; re-releases include: 2007 Sunbeam Records CD SBRCD5036; 2022 Esoteric Recordings)

=== Live album ===
- Love Bomb - Live 1967-69 (Live album - 2009, Sunbeam Records 2CD SBR2CD5049, 3LP SBR3LP5049)

=== Compilations ===
- Collection (1988, Decal/Charly TCLIKD 43)
- What on Earth: Rarities 1967-69 (2009, Sunbeam Records CD SBRCD5071)

As The Ingoes:

- Before We Were Blossom Toes (2010, Sunbeam Records)

=== Singles ===
- "What on Earth" / "Mrs. Murphy's Budgerigar" / "Look at Me I'm You" (October 1967, Marmalade 598002 EP)
- "I'll Be Your Baby Tonight" (Bob Dylan) b/w "Love Is" (March 1968, Marmalade 598009)
- "Postcard" / "Everybody's Leaving Me Now" (October 1968, Marmalade 598012; re-released January 2024, Think Like A Key TLAS002)
- "Peace Loving Man" / "Just Above My Hobby Horse's Head" (April 1969, Marmalade 598014)
- "New Day" (signaled on the SBRCD5036 Sunbeam Records CD as "unreleased 45 A-side") b/w "Love Bomb" (October 1969, Marmalade 598022)
