= Millionaires and Teddy Bears =

Studio album by Kevin Coyne
- Released: 1979-01-26
- Studio: Alvic Studios, West Kensington. London
- Genre: Blues rock, experimental rock
- Label: Virgin
- Producer: Kevin Coyne, Bob Ward

Kevin Coyne chronology
Dynamite Daze (1978)	Millionaires and Teddy Bears (1979)	Bursting Bubbles (1980)

Professional ratings
Review scores
Source	Rating
AllMusic	3/5 stars

Millionaires and Teddy Bears is a studio LP by the rock artist Kevin Coyne, released in 1979 by Virgin Records.

The poster to promote the album's release was designed by Cooke Key Associates.

== Track listing ==
All tracks composed by Kevin Coyne; except where indicated

1. "People" (Coyne, Bob Ward)
2. "Having a Party"
3. "I'll Go Too"
4. "I'm Just a Man"
5. "Pretty Park"
6. "Let Me Be with You"
7. "Marigold"
8. "Don't Blame Mandy"
9. "Little Miss Portobello"
10. "Wendy's Dream"
11. "The World is Full of Fools" (Coyne, Bob Ward)

== Personnel ==
=== Musicians ===
- Kevin Coyne – acoustic guitar, vocals
- Bob Ward – acoustic and electric guitars
- Paul Wickens – organ, piano, drums, accordion
- Vic Sweeney – drums
- Al James – bass

=== Other personnel ===
- Producers: Kevin Coyne and Bob Ward
- Engineers: Vic Sweeney and Al James
- Cover artwork: Kevin Coyne
