= Matching Head and Feet =

Studio album by Kevin Coyne
- Released: 1975
- Genre: Rock
- Label: Virgin
- Producer: Geoffrey Haslam

Kevin Coyne chronology
Blame It On The Night (1974)	Matching Head and Feet (1975)	Let's Have A Party (1976)

Matching Head and Feet is a studio album by musician Kevin Coyne, released in June 1975 on Virgin records. The album featured Andy Summers on guitar.

== Critical reception ==
Awarding the album a rating of B+, Robert Christgau wrote:

Coyne is the kind of minor artist whose faults-mainly an undeniable narrowness of emotional range that forces him to repeat effects-I am willing to overlook in this homogenized time. Sounding like a sly, bony, and clinically loony Joe Cocker (or a failed Deke Leonard), he here abandons quirky singer-songwriting for unkempt rock and roll."

Reviewing the album for AllMusic, Richie Unterberger said:

The arrangements are more conventional than most of his previous work, and much of the results are routine. Not lifeless, though; anything sung by Coyne will have roughness around the edges (and his voice here sometimes sounds not just raw, but downright worn). And songs about folks who carry guns, knives, and smash the faces of their wives (in "Turpentine") are not your usual rock fare. The words are unconventional, but the settings are average in a mid-'70s way, which dilutes the lyrics' impact, and makes this an unmemorable effort on the whole.

Steve Dinsdale in The Rough Guide to Rock described it as, "... a bit of a mixed bag, but one yielding a roaring highlight of Coyne's vocals in "Turpentine" and a gorgeous balled in "Sunday Morning Sunrise", aided by Summers effortless guitarwork".

== Track listing ==
All songs written by Kevin Coyne except where noted.

=== Side 1 ===
1. "Saviour" (Kevin Coyne, Archie Legget, Gordon Smith) – 5:31
2. "Lucy" (Coyne, Legget) – 3:02
3. "Lonely Lovers" – 4:19
4. "Sunday Morning Sunrise" – 5:33
5. "Rock 'n' Roll Hymn" (Coyne, Legget, Tim Penn) – 3:36

=== Side 2 ===
6. "Mrs. Hooley Go Home" – 6:04
7. "It's Not Me" – 3:40
8. "Turpentine" – 3:32
9. "Tulip" (Coyne, Andy Summers) – 6:36
10. "One Fine Day" – 4:15

== Personnel ==
=== Musicians ===
- Kevin Coyne – vocals
- Gordon Smith – semi-acoustic, electric and slide guitars
- Andy Summers – electric guitars
- Tim Penn – keyboards
- Archie Legget – bass
- Peter Woolf – drums and percussion
- Chris Mercer – tenor saxophone
- Bud Beadle – baritone saxophone
- Steve Gregory – tenor clarinet and flute

=== Technical ===
- Engineer – Michael Glossop
- Artwork, photography, design – Ray Smith
- Recorded at Farmyard on the Manor Mobile
