= Westbrook-Rossini =

Studio album by Mike Westbrook
- Released: 1987
- Recorded: November 11–12, 1986
- Studio: Radio DRS, Zurich, Switzerland
- Genre: Jazz
- Length: 72:20
- Label: hat ART hat ART 2040
- Producer: Werner X. Uehlinger

Mike Westbrook chronology
| Westbrook-Rossini, Zürich Live 1986 (1986) | Westbrook-Rossini (1987) | Off Abbey Road (1989) |

Westbrook-Rossini is an album by Mike Westbrook, featuring interpretations of works by Gioachino Rossini which was recorded in Switzerland in 1986 and first released on the hat ART label the following year.

== Reception ==
Professional ratings
Review scores
| Source | Rating |
|---|---|
| Allmusic | 4.5/5 stars |
| All About Jazz | 4/5 stars |

The Allmusic review by Thom Jurek stated "This is a huge work, with spiraling Italian tarantellas played by Westbrook on the tuba, gorgeous arias sung by Kate, outlandish improvisational episodes where Lindsay Cooper gets to shine on her sopranino saxophone and Peter Whyman on his alto, and wildly contrapuntal flowing swing from Andy Grappy's tuba and Westbrook's piano ... There is nothing extra -- no bombast or academic seriousness. Only joy, wondrous innovation, and a truly accurate ear to bring the modernism in the original works to a postmodern audience". On All About Jazz Chris May said "It's a playful, mellifluous affair in which Westbrook celebrates some of Rossini's best known tunes (even non-opera buffs will recognize most of them), refracted through his own singular, multifaceted, musical prism. Grand opera aside, the suite draws from post-Duke Ellington orchestral jazz, jazz-rock, free improv, Maghrebi folk music, tango and (slightly drunken) Ruritanian marches ... Westbrook-Rossini might not make an opera fan of you...but then again, stranger things have happened."

== Track listing ==
All compositions by Gioachino Rossini with additional material by Mike Westbrook

1. "William Tell Overture II" – 1:50
2. "William Tell Overture III" – 2:43
3. "The Thieving Magpie Overture" – 1:46
4. "L' Amoroso E Sincero Lindoro" – 17:14
5. "L' Amoroso E Sincero Lindoro" – 11:10
6. "William Tell Overture IV" – 5:25
7. "The Barber of Seville Overture" – 7:10
8. "Thiev-Ish Magpie" – 8:24
9. "William Tell Overture I" – 2:48
10. "Si Cinge Il Pro'guerriero" – 4:19
11. "Isaura" – 12:25
12. "Tutto Cangia" – 3:43
13. "William Tell Overture V" – 3:23

== Personnel ==
- Mike Westbrook – piano, tuba
- Kate Westbrook – tenor horn, piccolo, voice
- Paul Nieman – trombone
- Andy Grappy – tuba
- Lindsay Cooper – sopranino saxophone
- Peter Whyman – alto saxophone
- Peter Fairclough – drums
