= Nigel Burch =

- Born: 25 January 1954 (age 72); Braintree, Essex, England
- Genres: Punk, Acoustic, Folk-Punk, Cabaret
- Occupations: Singer-songwriter, artist
- Years active: 1972–present

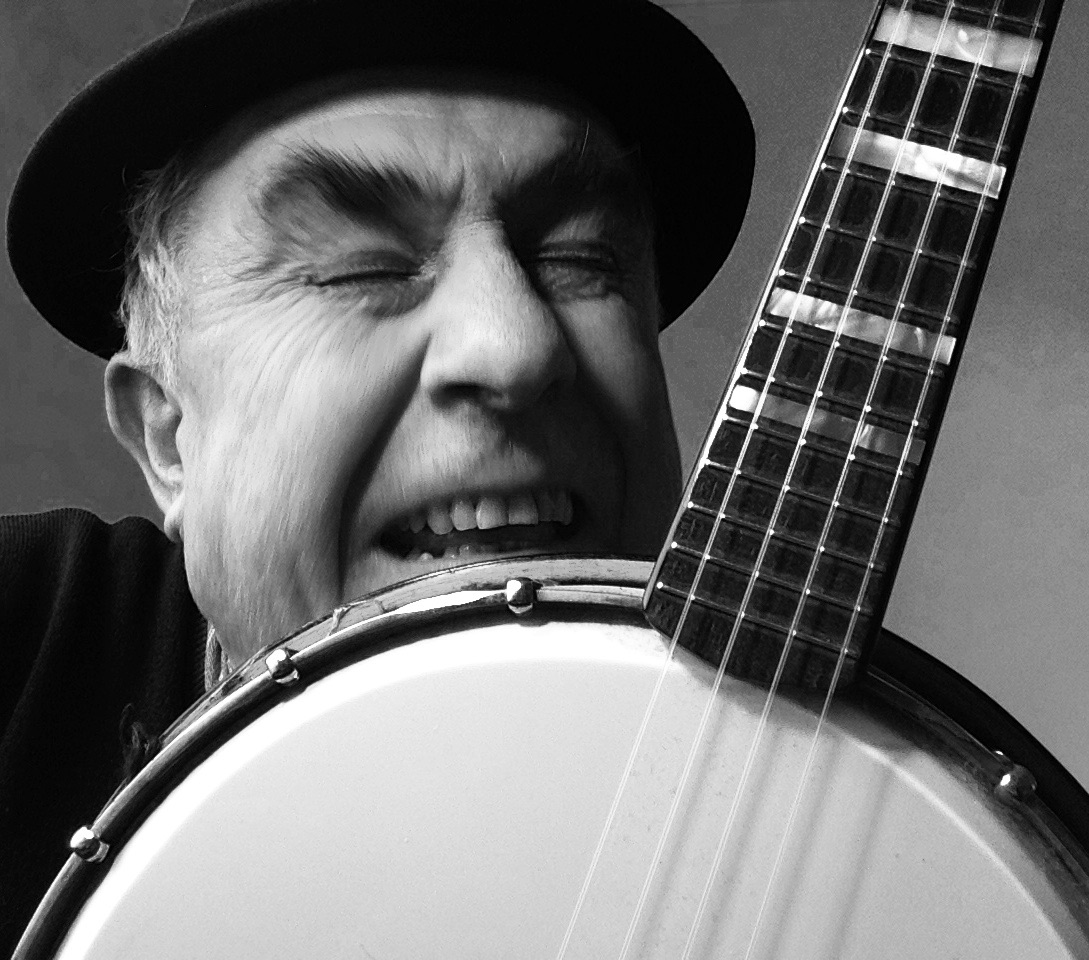
Nigel Burch in 2015.

Nigel Burch (born 25 January 1954) is an East London-based songwriter, musician, poet, and graphic artist now based in the London Borough of Hackney.

Musically covering the genres of punk, rock, folk, and anti-folk, Burch has collaborated with Kevin Coyne, John Cooper Clarke, Andrew Ranken (of The Pogues), and had an ongoing pen pal relationship with Charles Bukowski, who described Burch's writing as "the best cure for a hangover I ever lucked across." Burch's current band, Nigel Burch and The Flea-Pit Orchestra, have released three CDs, and often play live in London. A Guardian review called his music "a cross between the music of Ian Dury, Brecht and Weill, an Irish pub band, and a 1950s skiffle group. The urban-alienation songs might be too explicitly crammed with messages for some, but plenty of fierce, spontaneous playing".

Burch and band has toured internationally, with a significant following in Russia and Austria. Burch's self described "morbid drawings" are represented by The Nicholas Treadwell Gallery, have been shown in the UK, Austria, and Germany, and been published in a number of magazines.
