= Red Door (venue) =

New York City venue

- Interactive map of Red Door
- Address: 140 West 24th Street, New York, NY 10011 (between 6th Avenue & 7th Avenue)
- Location: Chelsea, Manhattan, New York, United States
- Coordinates: 40.744215°N 73.994148°W
- Owner: Giorgio Gomelsky
- Seating type: Standing
- Capacity: 250
- Type: Music Venue & Rehearsal Space

Construction
- Opened: 1978
- Closed: 2015

Red Door was a 2,000 SF event and music space located in the heart of Chelsea, New York City, that remained private to the public for 37 years. Its name changed over the years, but always based on the colors of the front door (previous incarnations were Green Door and Purple Door). The venue attracted a wide array of celebrities and personalities in the music and entertainment world.

== History ==
In 1978, Giorgio Gomelsky purchased a small industrial townhouse near the Chelsea Hotel in Manhattan, steps from Andy Warhol’s Factory. The space previously served as a printing press, and Gomelsky ultimately decided to turn the space into an accessible and affordable place for talented musicians and artists to develop, create and showcase their works. The goal was to provide a safe haven to make music and art that wasn’t exactly commercial and could shake up the NY scene.

== Notable artists ==
- Alejandro Escovedo
- Arto Lindsay
- Bad Brains
- Bill Laswell
- Billy Bang
- Glenn Branca
- Jason Reischel
- Jeff Buckley
- Jesse Malin
- Richard Hell
- Richard Lloyd
- The Rapture
- Dave Soldier
- Sheffer Stephens
- The Walkmen

== Kickstarter and closure ==
In 2003, the venue sustained substantial roof damage due to debris falling from a neighboring building. The artist-supported venue had limited repair funds and the building slowly fell into decline. In an effort to save the venue, Raul Gonzalez, Ian Cuttler and Giorgio Gomelsky formed Red Door Collective to restore the venue to its former glory. They begin a Kickstarter campaign which raised $25,025 of their $25,000 goal. This begin initial repairs on the facility and the venue continued to host music-centric events. After a heavy rain, the damaged infrastructure threatened the safety of anyone who entered the establishment and the New York City Department of Buildings issued a full vacate order on the property. On May 13, 2013, Raul Gonzalez of the Red Door Collective updated the public by saying, "Gomelsky has been compelled to move from the space, which is slated for a sale and likely demolition later this summer."

== The Red Door Today ==
In February 2016, the once bright red door was covered in graffiti with a memorial to its former proprietor, Giorgio Gomelsky, who died on January 13, 2016, from cancer. Demolition began in 2017.
