= The Cortège (album) =

Studio album by Mike Westbrook Orchestra
- Released: 1982
- Recorded: March and April 1982
- Studio: The Music Centre, Wembley, England
- Genre: Jazz
- Length: 136:45
- Label: Original ORA 309
- Producer: Fiachra Trench, Kate Westbrook, Mike Westbrook

Mike Westbrook chronology
The Paris Album (1981)	The Cortège (1982)	A Little Westbrook Music (1983)

The Cortège is an album by the Mike Westbrook Orchestra, performing a composition for jazz orchestra composed by Westbrook with texts from Federico García Lorca, Arthur Rimbaud, Hermann Hesse, William Blake, Giuseppe Gioachino Belli, John Clare, Pentti Saarikoski, and other European poetry, which was recorded in 1982 and first released as a triple LP on the Original label and reissued as a double CD on Enja in 1993 and 2011.

== Reception ==
Professional ratings
Review scores
Source	Rating
All About Jazz	5/5 stars
AllMusic	4.5/5 stars

The AllMusic review by Dave Lynch called the album "an often stunning work of massive scope and an indisputable highlight of Westbrook's career" and stated "The Cortège might be too sprawling for a first investigation of Westbrook, but it warrants consideration as the centerpiece of any Westbrook collection".

On All About Jazz, Chris May called it "one of finest achievements of British orchestral jazz".

The Observer's Dave Gelly noted: "It's only recently that the evolution of distinctly European forms of jazz has been acknowledged, but it began decades ago. One of the first milestones was this huge, unsettling work. .... The Cortège evolved over several years and, if there is a definitive version, this 1982 recording is it".

== Track listing ==
All compositions by Mike Westbrook

1. "It Starts Here" – 5:18
2. "Democratie" – 7:55
3. "Berlin 16.2.79" – 9:25
4. "Erme Estuary" – 8:40
5. "Guitar Solo" – 2:31
6. "Knivshult/Ash Wednesday" – 4:54
7. "Ruote Che Girano" – 6:48
8. "Piano" – 3:06
9. "Leñador" – 11:32
10. "July '79" – 12:49
11. "Enfance" – 14:03
12. "Cordoba" – 8:11
13. "Santarcangelo: Flee as a Bird" – 1:18
14. "Santarcangelo: Evening" – 1:35
15. "Santarcangelo: Jerusalem" – 2:27
16. "Santarcangelo: Dawn" – 1:50
17. "Santarcangelo: Piped Music" – 3:35
18. "Santarcangelo: Dirge" – 0:55
19. "Santarcangelo: Didn't He Ramble" – 1:41
20. "Santarcangelo: Cadenza" – 3:39
21. "Kyrie" – 6:12
22. "A Hearth Burns: The Toper's Rant" – 8:49
23. "A Hearth Burns: Une Vie" – 1:15
24. "Graffitti" – 6:24
25. "Duet" – 2:45

== Personnel ==
- Mike Westbrook – piano, tuba
- Phil Minton – trumpet, voice
- Dave Plews, Guy Barker, Dick Pearce – trumpet
- Malcolm Griffiths – trombone
- Kate Westbrook – tenor horn, piccolo, bamboo flute, voice
- Alan Sinclair, Dave Powell – tuba
- Chris Hunter, Phil Todd, Chris Biscoe – saxophones
- Lindsay Cooper – bassoon, oboe, saxophone
- Brian Godding – guitar
- Georgie Born – cello
- Steve Cook – bass
- Dave Barry – drums
