= Bursting Bubbles =

Studio album by Kevin Coyne
- Released: 1980
- Studio: Alvic Studios, Wimbledon, London
- Genre: Rock
- Label: Virgin V2152
- Producer: Kevin Coyne, Al James

Kevin Coyne chronology
Millionaires and Teddy Bears (1979)	Bursting Bubbles (1980)	Sanity Stomp (1980)

Professional ratings
Review scores
Source	Rating
Allmusic	4/5 stars
Q Magazine	3/5 stars

Bursting Bubbles is a studio album by the British rock musician Kevin Coyne, which was released on the Virgin label in 1980. Colin Larkin in the 2011 edition of his Encyclopedia of Popular Music, gives the album three stars.

This album features the first collaboration with guitarist Brian Godding, who had been playing live with Coyne. Much of the material was quickly recorded according to Godding: "I'd play a riff and he'd get out some pieces of paper and start singing along. I'd say, ‘So now let's develop it,' and he'd say ‘No it's great, it's finished."

== Reception ==
The album was described by Penny Kiley of Melody Maker as follows:

"These are personal songs from people you'd rather not be. Sympathise at your peril. You can try to avoid the messages. The music is interesting and quite accessible. Often it's only the voice that hurts, while the music can be attractively rhythmic (anguish you can dance to) or even gentle. The music seems oblivious to the pain, yet it fits."

Coyne would later perform "Children's Crusade" as part of his concert, on 6 October 1982, at the original Tempodrom, close to the Berlin Wall. The performance was filmed and later released as At The Last Wall.

The album was re-released in 1991 and Q Magazine described it as "in the spirit of the Peel sessions", while Dave Thompson from Allmusic viewed it as 'a darkly tempered, and roughly produced collection'.

Reviewing the album for makeyourowntaste.com in 2013, Allister Thompson wrote: "This is the "difficult" album, and every troubled but talented artist seems to have one... Bursting Bubbles is as naked as Coyne ever was, a collection of heart-wrenching vignettes from the dark side of the mind, sometimes accompanied by weirdly cold post-punk backing, such as the distorted guitar and drum machine of "Dark Dance Hall". Coyne’s voice is an anguished yell of pain on several pieces. Yet there is still much beauty to be found, particularly in what may be Coyne’s finest song, "Children's Crusade"..."

== Track listing ==
All tracks composed by Kevin Coyne and Brian Godding, except where indicated.

1. "The Only One" (Coyne)
2. "Children's Crusade" (Coyne)
3. "No Melody" (Coyne)
4. "Learn to Swim – Learn to Drown"
5. "Mad Boy No. 2"
6. "Dark Dance Hall"
7. "Don't Know What to Do"
8. "A Little Piece of Heaven"
9. "Day to Day"
10. "Golden Days" (Bob Ward)
11. "Old Fashioned Love Song"

== Personnel ==
=== Musicians ===
- Kevin Coyne – acoustic guitar, vocals
- Brian Godding – guitar
- Bob Ward – guitar
- Chris Hunter – saxophone
- Vic Sweeney – drums

=== Technical ===
- Producers: Kevin Coyne and Al James
- Engineers: Al James and Vic Sweeney
- Cover artwork: Kevin Coyne
