= On Duke's Birthday =

Live album by Mike Westbrook Orchestra
- Released: 1985
- Recorded: May 12, 1984
- Venue: Le Grand Theatre, Maison de la Culture, Amiens
- Genre: Jazz
- Length: 74:34
- Label: Hat Hut Hat ART 2012
- Producer: Fiachra Trench

Mike Westbrook chronology
Love For Sale (1985)	On Duke's Birthday (1985)	The Ass (1985)

On Duke's Birthday is a live album by the Mike Westbrook Orchestra performing a five song suite dedicated to the memory of Duke Ellington which was recorded in France in 1984 and released on the Hat Hut label in 1985. The suite was commissioned by two festivals, Le Temps du Jazz and Jazz en France-Angouleme, to mark the 10th anniversary of the death of Ellington.

== Reception ==
Professional ratings
Review scores
Source	Rating
Penguin Guide to Jazz	4/4 stars
Allmusic	4.5/5 stars
All About Jazz	4/5 stars
The Guardian	4/5 stars

The Penguin Guide to Jazz identified the album as part of their suggested "Core Collection" of essential jazz albums.

The Allmusic review by Thom Jurek stated "Ultimately, this is one of Westbrook's most accessible records, in that he leaves the vanguard completely out of the mix and moves instead toward opening up diatonic harmony to a set of colors and shades it perhaps hasn't encountered before, and the winner, of course, is the listener -- just take in the rave applause this band gets from the crowd. If you can only have one Mike Westbrook record, let it be this one".

On All About Jazz Chris May called it "An enduring album of idiosyncratically conceived and brilliantly realized orchestral jazz".

The Guardian's John Fordham rated the album 4 stars out of 5, saying, "Westbrook's catholic taste has made him more popular on the European continent than in his homeland, but this 1984 tribute to Duke Ellington not only confirms the depths of his jazz roots, but also how effectively he can evoke the spirits of his biggest heroes without mimicking them".

== Track listing ==
All compositions by Mike Westbrook

1. "Checking in at Hotel Le Prieure" - 8:50
2. "On Duke's Birthday 1" - 16:20
3. "East Stratford Too-Doo" - 23:00
4. "On Duke's Birthday 2" - 19:00
5. "Music Is..." - 13:00

== Personnel ==
- Mike Westbrook - piano
- Dominique Pifarély - violin
- Georgie Born - cello
- Brian Godding - electric guitar
- Chris Biscoe - alto saxophone, soprano saxophone, baritone saxophone, piccolo, alto clarinet
- Danilo Terenzi - trombone
- Kate Westbrook - tenor horn, piccolo, bamboo flute, voice
- Stuart Brooks, Phil Minton - trumpet, voice
- Steve Cook - bass guitar
- Tony Marsh - drums
