= Heartburn (disambiguation) =

Heartburn is a burning sensation in the chest.

Heartburn may also refer to:

- Heartburn (novel), a 1983 novel by Nora Ephron
- Heartburn (film), a 1986 Mike Nichols comedy-drama film based on the novel
- Heartburn (album), a 1976 album by Kevin Coyne
- "Heartburn", a song from Just Jack's 2002 album The Outer Marker
- "Heartburn", a song from Alicia Keys' 2003 album The Diary of Alicia Keys
- "Heart Burn (song)", a 2022 song by Sunmi
- "Heart Burn", an episode from season 18 of Family Guy
