= Sanity Stomp =

Studio album by Kevin Coyne
- Released: 1980
- Recorded: Disc 1: Berry Street Studio, Clerkenwell, London; Disc 2: Alvic Studios, Wimbledon, London
- Genre: Rock
- Label: Virgin
- Producer: Kevin Coyne and Paul Wickens

Kevin Coyne chronology
Bursting Bubbles (1980)	Sanity Stomp (1980)	The Dandelion Years (1981)

Sanity Stomp is a double studio album by British rock artist Kevin Coyne which was released in 1980 by Virgin Records. The first disc was recorded with The Ruts, the second with his usual musicians.

== Background ==
Of this album, Coyne himself said:

I was quite ill when I made that record, as a matter of fact; I was quite mad, basically. That's why it's called Sanity Stomp.... That's a record I made when I was clinically ninety-five per cent nuts, and the themes are rather odd, but somehow it comes out as sounding all right.

== Reception ==
Writing for AllMusic, Dave Thompson said:

"If Bursting Bubbles saw Kevin Coyne pursue the joys of anti-production to its logical conclusion, Sanity Stomp -- his second new album in less than a year -- caught him furiously flinging himself back into the fray, at least in part.... few albums have been so aptly titled.

== Disc 1 ==
=== Track listing ===
1. "Fat Man"
2. "The Monkey Man"
3. "How Strange"
4. "Somewhere In My Mind"
5. "When (See You Again?)"
1. "Taking On The World"
2. "No Romance"
3. "Too Dark (One for the Hero)"
4. "Admit You're Wrong"
5. "Formula Eyes"

=== Personnel ===
- Kevin Coyne – vocals
- Paul Fox – guitar
- John "Segs" Jennings – bass
- Dave Ruffy – drums
- Gary Barnacle – saxophone
- Paul Wickens – keyboards

(Fox, Jennings, Ruffy, and Barnacle were all members of The Ruts)

- Producer: Paul Wickens
- Engineer: David Hunt at Berry Street Studio

== Disc 2 ==
=== Track listing ===
1. "New Motorway"
2. "A Loving Hand"
3. "Fear of Breathing"
4. "In Silence"
5. "Taking On the Bowers" (Robert Wyatt)
1. "Wonderful Wilderness" (Brian Godding)
2. "My Wife Says"
3. "The World Speaks" (Brian Godding)
4. "You Can't Kill Us"

=== Personnel ===
- Kevin Coyne – guitar, keyboards, vocals
- Brian Godding – electric guitar and keyboards
- Robert Wyatt – drums, keyboards
- Bob Ward – second guitar
- Producer: Kevin Coyne
- Engineer: Mike at Alvic Studios
- Johnnie Rutter – front cover photography
- Back cover artwork: Robert Coyne
