= Marmalade Records =

British record label

Marmalade Records was a short-lived British independent record label (distributed by Polydor). Started in 1966 by Swiss-resident Georgian pop impresario and ex-manager of both the Rolling Stones and the Yardbirds, Giorgio Gomelsky, Marmalade Records released records by artists including Julie Driscoll with Brian Auger and The Trinity, who reached No.5 in the UK in 1968 with "This Wheel's on Fire"; Blossom Toes; early recordings by Graham Gouldman, Kevin Godley and Lol Creme, who became 10cc; as well as John McLaughlin's first solo album. Marmalade's first release, in August 1966, was a controversial single called "We Love The Pirate Stations", by five well-known musicians masquerading as The Roaring 60's. They were mainly members of the Ivy League, who later went on to release hits as The Flower Pot Men. "We Love The Pirates" was not a hit despite extensive airplay on Radio 270, Radio Caroline and Radio London – it was a half-hearted Beach Boys pastiche at medium tempo, but still well-loved by pirate radio aficionados.

The Marmalade label ceased to exist in 1969 when it ran out of funds.

== Aftermath ==
Driscoll again performed "This Wheel's on Fire" – without Auger – as the closing title music for BBC TV's Absolutely Fabulous comedy show between 1990 and 1996. She was partnered on that version of the Bob Dylan/Rick Danko song by Adrian Edmondson, the husband of AbFab writer and star Jennifer Saunders.

After a time managing French progressive rock band Magma, Gomelsky headed for New York City in the mid-1970s, where he co-founded Utopia Records, a label that was to have had the same alternative innovative focus as Marmalade. Gomelsky produced Magma's Live/Hhaï album for Utopia in 1975. Utopia, co-founded with Kevin Eggers, was allegedly financed by then-RCA president Ken Glancy. Gomelsky was slowly sidelined, and Eggers effectively took over the reins. Utopia later went to the wall, with Tomato Records growing out of the wreckage and taking over Utopia's back catalogue. Tomato re-released Live/Hhaï in 1978. Gomelsky's production appeared again, in versions of varying lengths, on the French 'Label Du Bon Independent' in 1985, on Paris-based '7th Records' in 1989, on the UK's Charly Records, and again on Tomato Records in 1996, on Japan's Victor Records and again on Charly in 2001. It was issued again on 7th Records, this time in Japan, in 2009.

== Discography ==
=== Singles ===
- The Roaring 60's – "We Love The Pirates" / "I'm Leaving Town" (1966, Marmalade 598001)
- Blossom Toes – "What on Earth" / "Mrs. Murphy's Budgerigar" / "Look at Me I'm You" (October 1967, Marmalade 598002)
- Brian Auger & The Trinity – "Red Beans And Rice" / "Part 2" (1967, Marmalade 598003)
- Julie Driscoll, Brian Auger & The Trinity – "Save Me" / "Part 2" (1967, Marmalade 598004)
- Chris Barber's Band – "Cat Call" / "Mercy, Mercy, Mercy" (1967, Marmalade 598005)
- Julie Driscoll, Brian Auger & The Trinity – "This Wheel's on Fire" / "A Kind of Love-In" (No. 5 UK, April 1968, Marmalade 598006)
- Kevin Westlake & Gary Farr – "Everyday" / "Green" (1968, Marmalade 598007)
- Blossom Toes – "I'll Be Your Baby Tonight" (Bob Dylan) b/w "Love Is" (March 1968, Marmalade 598009)
- Gordon Jackson – "Me Am My Zoo" / "A Day at the Cottage" (1968, Marmalade 598010)
- Julie Driscoll, Brian Auger & The Trinity – "Road to Cairo" / "Shadows of You" (1968, Marmalade 598011)
- Blossom Toes – "Postcard" / "Everybody's Leaving Me Now" (October 1968, Marmalade 598012)
- Chris Barber & His Jazzband – "Battersea Rain Dance" / "Sleepy John" (1969, Marmalade 598013)
- Blossom Toes – "Peace Loving Man" / "Above My Hobby Horses Head" (April 1969, Marmalade 598014)
- Brian Auger & The Trinity – "What You Gonna Do?" / "Bumpin' On Sunset" (1969, Marmalade 598015)
- Keith Meehan – "Darkness of My Life" / "Hooker Street" (1969, Marmalade 598016)
- Gary Farr – "Hey Daddy" / "The Vicar & The Pope" (1969, Marmalade 598017)
- Julie Driscoll, Brian Auger & The Trinity – "Take Me to The Water" / "Indian Rope Man" (1969, Marmalade 598018)
- Frabjoy And Runcible Spoon – "I'm Beside Myself" / "Animal Song" (1969, Marmalade 598019)
- Ottilie Patterson – "Bitterness of Death" / "Spring Song" (1969, Marmalade 598020)
- Gordon Jackson – "Song For Freedom" / "Sing To Me Woman" (1969, Marmalade 598021)
- Blossom Toes – "New Day" / "Love Bomb" (October 1969, Marmalade 598022)
- Julie Driscoll, Brian Auger & The Trinity – Indian Rope Man / I've Gotta Go Now (1969, Marmalade 598023)

=== Albums ===
- Blossom Toes – We Are Ever So Clean (October 1967, Marmalade 607001 (mono) 608001 (stereo))
- Julie Driscoll, Brian Auger and the Trinity – Open (1967, Marmalade 608002)
- Brian Auger – Definitely What (1968, Marmalade 608003)
- Sonny Boy Williamson – Don't Send Me No Flowers (1968, Marmalade 608004)
- Julie Driscoll, Brian Auger and the Trinity – Streetnoise (Double Album 1968, Marmalade 608005/6)
- John McLaughlin – Extrapolation (1969) Marmalade 608007
- Chris Barber – Battersea Rain Dance (Album – 1969, Marmalade 608009)
- Blossom Toes – If Only for a Moment (Album – July 1969, Marmalade 608010)
- Ottilie Patterson – 3000 Years With Ottilie (Album – July 1969, Marmalade 608011)
- Gordon Jackson – Thinking Back (Album – July 1969, Marmalade 608012)
- Gary Farr – Take Something With You (Album – 1969, Marmalade 608013)
- Julie Driscoll, Brian Auger and the Trinity – Streetnoise Volume 1 (Album – 1969, Marmalade 608014)
- Julie Driscoll, Brian Auger and the Trinity – Streetnoise Volume 2 (Album – 1969, Marmalade 608015)
- Various Artists – 100° Proof (Sampler Marmalade 643314)
