= Pointing the Finger =

Studio album by Kevin Coyne
- Released: 1981
- Genre: Rock
- Label: Cherry Red
- Producer: Kevin Coyne, Brian Godding

Kevin Coyne chronology
The Dandelion Years (1981)	Pointing the Finger (1981)	Live in Berlin (1981)

Pointing the Finger is a studio album by the rock artist Kevin Coyne, released in 1981.

The title track dates from 1977 and Coyne's musical "England, England", and is described by him on the sleeve notes as covering "some of my ambivalent feelings about England and its vanished Empire."

== Critical reception ==
Professional ratings
Review scores
Source	Rating
AllMusic	2.5/5 stars
The Encyclopedia of Popular Music	3/5 stars

The Globe and Mail wrote that "Coyne, like Van Morrison, can be repetitious and his emotional range seems limited at times—but, when it comes to anguish, he has few peers."

Mark Cordery of the New Musical Express wrote, "The themes of this LP are generally the hoary old ones of 'Alienation'; the difficulty (and in many cases the tacitly accepted impossibility) of communication, and the insubstantiality and hence inadequacy of 'Religion'. Dealt with here in the 'soul-baring' 60's singer-songwriter style; mostly stripped of imagery, and completely of metaphor, it's a bleak but uncompelling vision. Not to say a narrow one."

== Track listing ==
1. "There She Goes" – 5.02
2. "As I Recall" – 4.27
3. "Children of the Deaf" – 1.06
4. "One Little Moment" – 6.30
5. "Let Love Reside" – 3.28
6. "Sleeping-Waking" – 4.17
7. "Pointing the Finger" – 4.07
8. "You Can't Do That" – 3.58
9. "Song of the Womb" – 2.36
10. "Old Lady" – 4.00

== Personnel ==
- Kevin Coyne – vocals, guitar
- Brian Godding – electric guitars
- Dave Sheen – drums, backing vocals on "Old Lady"
- Steve Lamb – bass guitar
- Steve Bull – keyboards, synthesizer

Technical

- Producers: Kevin Coyne and Brian Godding with G.L.S. (Godding, Lamb, Sheen) at Alvic Studios, West Kensington
- Engineer: Mike Gregovich
- Cover artwork: Kevin Coyne
