= Case History (album) =

1972 debut solo album by Kevon Coyne

Studio album by Kevin Coyne
- Released: 1972
- Genre: Folk, rock
- Length: 40:02
- Label: Dandelion AIRAC-1470
- Producer: Steve Verroca

Kevin Coyne chronology
Case History (1972)	Marjory Razorblade (1973)

Case History is the debut solo album by artist British rock musician Kevin Coyne, released in 1972 on Dandelion Records. It was in part inspired by his work at Whittingham Hospital, in Preston, Lancashire.

In January 2013 the album was re-released by Cherry Red Records.

The track "Sand All Yellow" also appears on the 1972 Dandelion compilation album There Is Some Fun Going Forward.

== Reception ==
Professional ratings
Review scores
Source	Rating
AllMusic	4.5/5 stars

In 2012 Toby Manning in Record Collector magazine praised Coyne's reflection on his experiences with the mentally ill within the album and on his songwriting.

== Track listing ==
All tracks composed by Kevin Coyne:

No.	Title	Length
1.	"God Bless the Bride"	3:55
2.	"White Horse"	4:14
3.	"Uggy's Song"	3:00
4.	"Need Somebody"	4:15
5.	"Evil Island Home"	5:02
6.	"Araby"	3:40
7.	"My Message to the People"	5:25
8.	"Mad Boy"	4:47
9.	"Sand All Yellow"	5:44
Total length:		40:02

== Personnel ==
Musicians

- Kevin Coyne – guitar, vocals
- Ron Brown – trombone
- John Chichester – guitar
- Dave Clague – bass, guitar
- Nick Cudworth – guitar, piano
- Tat Meager – drums
- Mick Sweeney – guitar

Production

- Kevin Coyne – drawing, producer
- Dave Clague – producer
- Nick Cudworth – paintings
- Andy Morten – design, layout
- Simon Murphy – remastering
- Clive Selwood – technician
- John Reed – coordination, interviewer
- Clive Selwood – production supervisor
- Ray Stevenson – photography
