= Heartburn (album) =

1976 studio album by Kevin Coyne

Studio album by Kevin Coyne
- Released: 1976
- Genre: Rock
- Label: Virgin
- Producer: Norman Smith

Kevin Coyne chronology
Let's Have a Party (1976)	Heartburn (1976)	In Living Black and White (1977)

Heartburn is a studio album by musician Kevin Coyne, his ninth, released in 1976 on the Virgin label.

== Background ==
The album cover, designed by Hipgnosis, depicts someone jumping off a building. A poster for release was also produced, by Cooke Key Associates, from photographs by Brian Cooke/Redferns.

The track "Don't Make Waves" (b/w "Mona Where's My Trousers") was issued as a single in 1976 and the songs "Shangri-la" and "Daddy" we both used as B-sides for singles the same year.

== Track listing ==
All songs written by Kevin Coyne except where noted.

=== Side 1 ===
1. "Strange Locomotion" (Coyne, Cudworth) – 3:28
2. "Don't Make Waves" – 2:50
3. "Happy Band" – 2:36
4. "I Love My Mother" (arr. Graham Preskett; Summers, Coyne) – 4:40
5. "Shangri-La" – 5:26

=== Side 2 ===
6. "America" – 4:07
7. "Big White Bird" – 2:05
8. "Games Games Games" – 5:32
9. "My Mother's Eyes" (Baer, lyrics by Gilbert) – 3:27
10. "Daddy" – 4:12

== Personnel ==
=== Musicians ===
- Kevin Coyne – acoustic guitar, vocals
- Andy Summers – guitar
- Zoot Money – keyboards, backing vocals
- Steve Thompson – bass
- Peter Woolf – drums, percussion

=== Technical ===
- Engineer: Phil Chapman
- Producer: Norman Smith
- Recorded at Olympic Studios
- Artwork, photography, design – Hipgnosis
