= Kevin Coyne =

English musician (1944–2004)

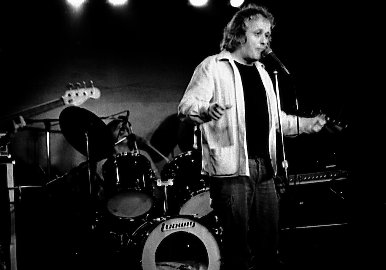
- Coyne at "The Edge" in Toronto, 5 June 1981

Background information
- Born: Kevin Coyne; 27 January 1944; Derby, Derbyshire, England
- Died: 2 December 2004 (aged 60) Nuremberg, Bavaria, Germany
- Genres: Rock, new wave, alternative rock
- Occupations: Musician, composer, singer, artist, writer, poet, filmmaker
- Instruments: Vocals, harmonica, guitar
- Years active: 1968–2004
- Labels: Dandelion, Elektra, Virgin, Cherry Red, Blast First Petite, Ruf
- Formerly of: Siren
- Website: Official website
- Family: Robert Coyne (son)

Kevin Coyne (27 January 1944 – 2 December 2004) was an English musician, singer, composer, film-maker, and a writer of lyrics, stories and poems. He was critically acclaimed for his unorthodox style of blues-influenced guitar composition, the intense quality of his vocal delivery, and his lyrics describing injustice to the mentally ill. Musicians who have described themselves as Coyne fans include Sting and John Lydon. In the mid-1970s, prior to the formation of the Police, Coyne's band included guitarist Andy Summers. BBC disc jockey Andy Kershaw described Coyne as "a national treasure who keeps getting better" and as one of the great British blues voices.

Over many years Coyne produced the art work for many of his own album covers. His move to Germany, in the 1980s, saw his work on full-size paintings blossom in its own right.

== Early days ==
Coyne was born in Derby, Derbyshire, England. As a teenager and young adult Coyne studied at the Joseph Wright School of Art from 1957 to 1961 and then studied graphics and painting at Derby School of Art from 1961 to 1965. There he met Nick Cudworth (piano, acoustic guitar). His love of American bluesmen developed, as did his song-craft and his guitar and vocal talents.

At the conclusion of his arts training, Coyne began the work that would change him forever – he spent 1965 to 1968 working as a social therapist and psychiatric nurse at Whittingham Hospital near Preston in Lancashire and then for "The Soho Project" in London as a drugs counsellor. During this period of working with the mentally ill he performed regularly. Subsequently, his musical aspirations took precedence and he signed a record deal in 1969.

Joined by Dave Clague (bass, acoustic guitar, ex-Bonzo Dog Doo-Dah Band), Coyne's band got an early break as a result of a demo heard by John Peel, who in 1969 signed them to his Dandelion Records label. At first billed as Coyne-Clague (an early Dandelion release erroneously named them just "Clague"), the band soon altered its name to Siren. Reviewing the band's 1971 LP Strange Locomotion, Robert Christgau wrote in Christgau's Record Guide: Rock Albums of the Seventies (1981): "Like Fleetwood Mac, this is British blues that neither chokes on false roots nor enmires itself in boogie reductionism. Kevin Coyne's humorously belligerent drawl embodies the band's wit and its punk chauvinism. Mistake: 'Fetch Me My Woman,' which (second mistake) goes on for 7:40."

== An established artist ==
In 1973 he appeared on the BBC's The Old Grey Whistle Test, performing "I Want My Crown" and "House on the Hill" with guitarist Gordon Smith and percussionist Chilli Charles. In 1975 Coyne and his band performed at the alternative festival held to protest against the Eurovision Song Contest 1975 in Stockholm; footage from the concert was later released as the 1976 film Musikfilmen.

In late 1975 and 1976 Coyne completed the musical England, England, written with playwright Snoo Wilson, and described as "an evocation of the Kray twins". The musical, directed by Dusty Hughes, was performed in August 1977 at the Jeannetta Cochrane Theatre, in Holborn, London. It drew attention to the associations between fascism and the type of British nationalism that later saw the rise of the National Front and the election of Margaret Thatcher. From 18 August to 24 September 1977 it played at the Bush Theatre in Shepherd's Bush.

In 1978 Coyne collaborated with fellow Derby Art School graduate Ian Breakwell to produce the film The Institution based on Breakwell's Artist Placement Group work at Rampton Secure Hospital in Nottinghamshire.

Early in his career, Coyne turned down a meeting with founder of Elektra Records Jac Holzman (Coyne's band Siren were on Elektra in America) to discuss replacing Jim Morrison in the Doors. "I didn't like the leather trousers!" was Coynes' alleged reason.

Coyne's first solo album, mainly with only his voice and guitar, was Case History (1972), released on Peel's Dandelion label. It was not a success, but it was noticed by Virgin Records, which signed Coyne and released his 1973 album Marjory Razorblade. The single "Marlene" (b/w "Everybody Says"), taken from the album and released in August 1973, was the first Virgin single.

Coyne was the second artist signed to Virgin Records, after Mike Oldfield. Coyne got on well with label-mates such as John Lydon, who played "Eastbourne Ladies" on a Desert Island Discs–type show, and the Mekons, who recorded his "Having a Party", an attack on Richard Branson. Described as being musically "... a mixture of blues and music hall comedy, with a punk edge", the 1973 album contained many notable songs, such as "Eastbourne Ladies" and "House on the Hill" about life in a psychiatric institution. It was the record that established Coyne's reputation.

In 1976 Coyne released the live album In Living Black and White that included Zoot Money, Andy Summers, Steve Thompson and Peter Woolf. Culled from three shows, it featured a cover of Bob Dylan's "Knocking on Heaven's Door".

Advertisement for the theatre presentation of Babble, from Melody Maker, July 1979

Released in 1979, the album Babble, by Coyne and singer Dagmar Krause, was subtitled "Songs for Lonely Lovers", with Q magazine noting that Coyne's and Krause's voices "complement each other so well (...) the song functions as a kind of exchange."

The subsequent tour courted controversy when Coyne suggested, in the theatre presentation of the piece, that the destructive relationship between the two lovers could have been based on the Moors murderers. Two performances at the Theatre Royal in Stratford, London were cancelled at short notice by Newham Council following negative press reports in The Sun and the Evening Standard. The show was eventually staged, for four nights, at the Oval House in Kennington. Reviewing the show for the NME, Paul Du Noyer wrote:

"Babble" is a particularly thorough, painstaking exploration of the reality of one relationship, stripped of romance and artifice. The format employed is correspondingly stark. Against a stage-set of light-bulb, table and chairs Coyne and his partner Dagmar Krause stand at either side; the only accompaniment comes from Bob Ward and Brian Godding, playing electric and acoustic guitar in the gloom behind.

American singer/songwriter Will Oldham claimed that the Babble album had "changed my life" and he recorded two of the songs himself. Oldham also went on to form a side project called The Babblers – who strictly played covers of songs from Babble. Extracts from a performance of Babble, in Berlin, were included in the short German film Herz Aus Feuer (1979) by Claudia Strauven and Wolfgang Kraesze.

The album Politicz, featuring Peter Kirtley on guitar and Steve Bull on keyboards, was released in 1982. AllMusic's reviewer Dean McFarlane described the album as "One of the British singer/songwriter's more outwardly experimental records, this album contains some of his most intimate work, deeply personal songs and techniques which were taking him further and further away from tradition... strictly a post-punk album with a humorous political agenda". The same year, Coyne appeared in concert with his band (Peter Kirtley (guitar), Steve Lamb (bass), Steve Bull (keyboards) and Dave Wilson(drums)) live in front of the Berlin Wall at the Tempodrom. The concert was later issued on the 2008 DVD At the Last Wall (Dockland Productions, Meyer Records).

== Nuremberg ==
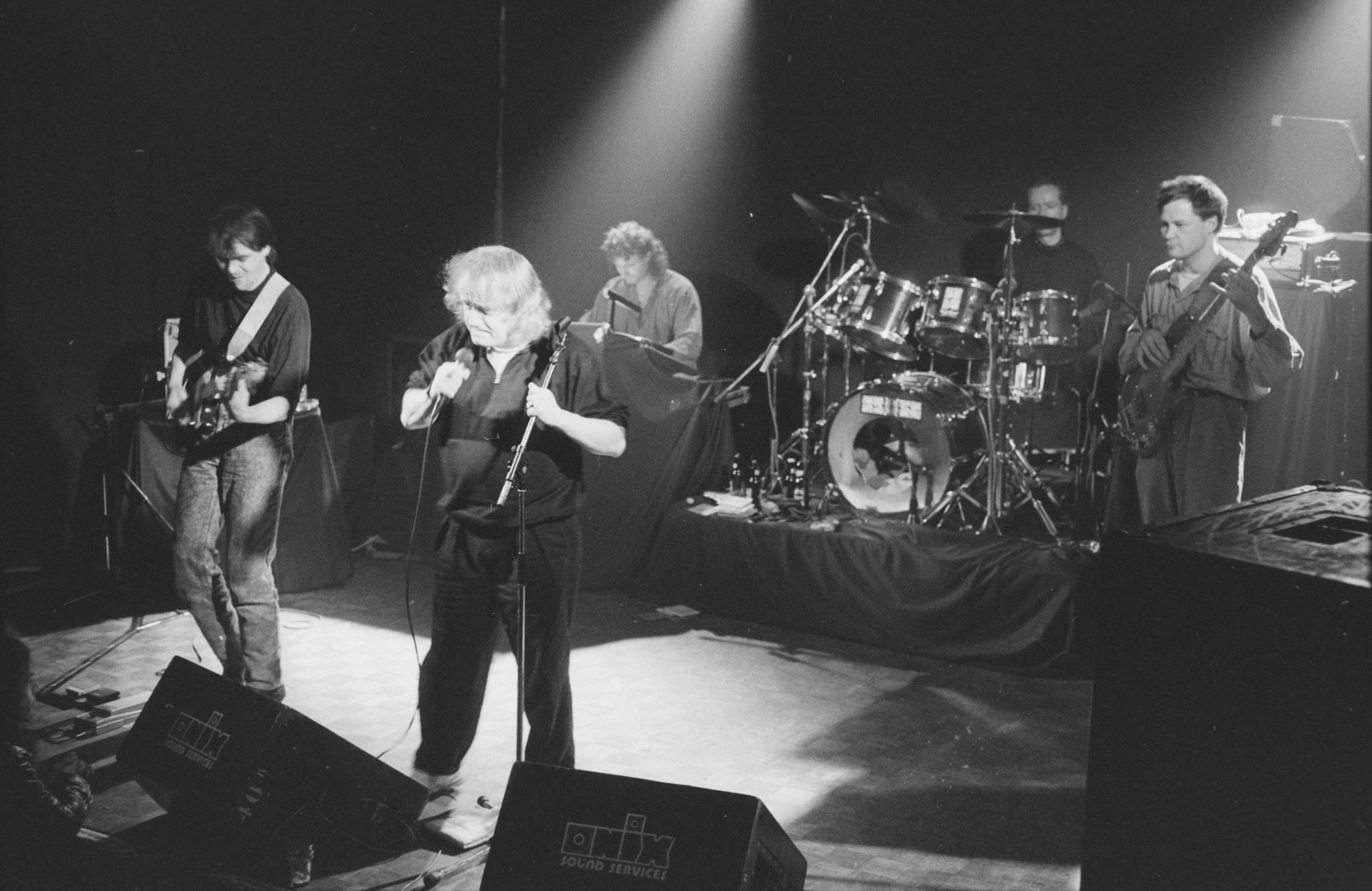
Kevin Coyne in Haarlem (1988)

Following a nervous breakdown and increasing difficulties with drink, Coyne left the UK in 1985. He settled in Nuremberg, West Germany and having given up alcohol, never stopped recording and touring, as well as writing books and exhibiting his paintings.

Coyne's move to Germany saw his writing and painting career blossom. He published four books, two of which, Showbusiness and Party Dress, were published by Serpent's Tail in London. There were numerous exhibitions of his visual work throughout Europe. Those in Berlin, Amsterdam and Zürich were well reviewed and attended.

In the late 1980s Coyne acted on stage, playing the small part of a rock star in Linie Eins (Line One), a German musical, at the Nuremberg Opera House. At the start of the 1990s Virgin began reissuing the albums on CD. This included a collection of Peel sessions from the period 1973–1990. Q magazine noted that "the artistic focus of his albums is lost (...) the Peel Session is more fun".

His 1995 album, The Adventures of Crazy Frank, was based on a stage musical about English comedian Frank Randle, with Coyne in the title role. It also starred the singer Julia Kempken, who was erroneously listed in The Guardian obituary as Coyne's wife. Kempken later wrote fondly of this mistake, suggesting that her performance on stage as Randle's wife had been so strong as to transform her, in the eyes of the press, into Coyne's actual wife.

In Germany his sons from his first marriage, Eugene and Robert, appeared on recordings such as Tough And Sweet (1993) and Sugar Candy Taxi (1999), with guitarist and multi-instrumentalist Robert joining his band. His later German recordings, including Knocking on Your Brain (1997), often featured the "Paradise Band". In later years he also collaborated with Brendan Croker on Life Is Almost Wonderful, with Jon Langford of the Mekons (on One Day in Chicago) and with Gary Lucas once of Captain Beefheart's Magic Band (on Knocking on Your Brain). A reunion with original Siren members Dave Clague and Nick Cudworth happened for a John Peel's Dandelion Records DVD, alongside solo performances by Coyne.

In a 2004 interview with Frank Bangay, Coyne named his favourite blues musicians as Robert Johnson, Leroy Carr, Peetie Wheatstraw and Tommy McClennan.

== Death ==
Diagnosed with lung fibrosis in 2002, Coyne died in his adopted home of Nuremberg, Bavaria, Germany in 2004. He was survived by his wife Helmi and his sons Eugene, Robert and Nico.

Writing in his obituary in The Guardian, Alan Clayson said,

... Virgin's press office referred to him as an 'anti-star' ... If he meant nothing in the Top 40, Coyne was appreciated as a songwriter's songwriter, and collaborated with musicians such as Zoot Money, Andy Summers, Carla Bley, Robert Wyatt... He earned, too, the admiration of Johnny Rotten and Sting. Coyne was infinitely less precious and artistically self-centred than other artists of that era, such as Nick Drake, Melanie Safka and James Taylor, whose primarily acoustic albums appealed more to self-doubting adolescent diarists than fans of heavy metal, jazz-rock and similar genres that dominated early 1970s rock.

== 2007 tributes ==
In 2007, the Nightingales recorded a version of "Good Boy" for their album Out of True, Jackie Leven recorded a song about Coyne on his album Oh What A Blow The Phantom Dealt Me!, and "Here Come The Urban Ravens" featured on the album Whispers From The Offing – A Tribute to Kevin Coyne, put together by Coyne's friend Frank Bangay.

The full track listing for the CD version of the album was:

1. "Black Cloud" – Nigel Burch
2. "Talking To No One" – Big Mehr and friend
3. "Born Crazy" – Razz
4. "Sand All Yellow" – Goldfish
5. "Cycling" – Dog Latin
6. "Marlene" – Nikki Sudden
7. "Raindrops on the Window" – Kevin Hewick
8. "Hello Judas" – Alternative TV
9. "I Only Want To See You Smile" – Veronique Acoustique
10. "Blame It on the Night" – Grae J Wall
11. "My Evil Island Home" – Jowe Head
12. "Case History No 2" – Pascal Regis
13. "House on the Hill" – Leo O'Kelly
14. "Mad Boy No2" – Frank Bangay and almost real
15. "Looking for the River" – Chris Connelly
16. "Victoria Smiles" – Heinz Rudolf Kunze
17. "Are We Dreaming?" – The Otters (Ft. Mark Astronaut)
18. "Strange Pictures" – Dave Russell
19. "Weirdo" – Joey Stack
20. "A Loving Hand" – Clive Product
21. "Lonesome Valley" – Stumble on the Valves
22. "Here Come The Urban Ravens" – Jackie Leven
- The downloaded version also includes two bonus tracks – Sally Timm's "I'm Just A Man" and Jon Langford's "Having a Party" in Coyne's own voice.

In 2008 Swiss performance artist Pipilotti Rist produced a video in which she mimes "Jackie and Edna" against the background of various images, including film taken from a moving train. This video was exhibited in Helsinki's Kiasma Gallery in January 2012 as part of the "Thank you for the Music" exhibition.

== Critical appraisal ==
Although Coyne has been neglected by popular music historians and academics, George McKay's 2013 book Shakin' All Over: Popular Music and Disability features a critical discussion of Coyne's work. The book opens with an epigraph from Coyne: 'anything that rhymes with "me"' (from the song "Fat Girl" as performed on the 1977 album In Living Black and White). Describing him as 'the great lost English singer-songwriter' with his 'social-work approach to pop', McKay discusses the 1978 song "Having a Party" in the context of songs about the destructive economy of the pop industry. He also notes Coyne's 'anti-star' status and his innovative 'anti'-guitar playing: "Not being able, or electing not, to play the instrument 'properly', and hearing other voices while singing: there is something culturally disabling about each of these artistic choices, quite apart from the lyrical terrain".

On 15 June 2017 Coyne was commemorated with the unveiling of a blue plaque at the University of Derby Art School.

In January 2018, an exhibition of Coyne's work was staged at the city gallery Alte Feuerwache in Amberg An exhibition, accompanied by a 70-page catalogue, compiled by Stefan Voit, was held from 9 June to 5 August 2018, at the Städtische Galerie Cordonhaus in Cham.

In 2024 Coyne was featured in Underground: The Illustrated Bible of Cursed Rockers and High Priestesses of Sound by Arnaud Le Gouefflec and Nicolas Moog.

BBC disc jockey Andy Kershaw described Coyne as "a national treasure who keeps getting better" and as one of the great British blues voices.

== Discography ==
=== Albums ===
==== Solo and with his band ====
- (2019) Live At Rockpalast 1979. (2CDs + DVD) (Mig Music/Indigo; also previous editions without video, by other publishers.)
- (2013) Voice Of The Outsider: The Best of Kevin Coyne (Spectrum Audio)
- (2012) Nobody Dies In Dreamland: Home Recordings From 1972 (Turpentine, under license to Cherry Red Records)
- (2010) I Want My Crown: The Anthology 1973-1980 (CD boxed-set)
- (2008) On Air (Live at Radio Bremen, 18 August 1975)
- (2006) Underground
- (2005) One Day in Chicago (with Jon Langford & the Pine Valley Cosmonauts) (Buried Treasure Records)
- (2004) Donut City (Turpentine Records)
- (2002) Carnival (Ruf Records)
- (2002) Life is Almost Wonderful (with Brendan Croker)
- (2000) Room Full of Fools (Ruf Records)
- (2000) Sugar Candy Taxi (Ruf Records)
- (2000) Bittersweet Lovesongs
- (1997) Live Rough and More (Golden Hind)
- (1997) Knocking on Your Brain
- (1995) The Adventures of Crazy Frank
- (1995) The Club Rondo (with Siren, material recorded in 1969/1971) (DJC Records)
- (1994) Let's do it (with Siren, with material recorded in 1969/1970) (DJC Records)
- (1994) Rabbits (with Siren, material recorded in 1969/70) (DJC Records)
- (1994) Elvira: Songs from the Archives 1979–83
- (1994) Sign of the Times
- (1993) Tough and Sweet
- (1992) Burning Head
- (1991) Wild Tiger Love
- (1991) Peel Sessions
- (1990) Romance – Romance
- (1988) Everybody's Naked
- (1987) Stumbling on to Paradise
- (1985) Rough
- (1984) Legless In Manila
- (1983) Beautiful Extremes et cetera
- (1982) Politicz
- (1981) Live in Berlin
- (1981) Pointing the Finger
- (1981) The Dandelion Years
- (1980) Sanity Stomp (with Robert Wyatt)
- (1980) Bursting Bubbles (Virgin Records)
- (1979) Millionaires and Teddy Bears (Virgin Records)
- (1978) Dynamite Daze (Virgin Records)
- (1977) Beautiful Extremes (Virgin Records)
- (1977) In Living Black and White (Virgin Records)
- (1976) Heartburn (Virgin Records)
- (1976) Let's Have A Party (compilation) (Virgin Records)
- (1975) Matching Head and Feet (Virgin Records)
- (1974) Blame It on the Night (Virgin Records)
- (1973) Marjory Razorblade (Virgin Records)
- (1972) Case History (Dandelion Records)

==== With Siren ====
- Strange Locomotion – 1971
- Siren – 1969

==== With Dagmar Krause ====
- Babble – Songs for Lonely Lovers – 1979

=== Singles ===
- "Mandy Lee / Bottle Up and Go" – 1969
- "The Stride / I Wonder Where" – 1969
- "Ze-Ze-Ze-Ze / And I Wonder" – 1970
- "Strange Locomotion / I'm All Aching" – 1971
- "Cheat Me / Flowering Cherry" – 1972
- "Marlene / Everybody Says" – 1973
- "Lovesick Fool / Sea of Love" – 1973
- "Marlene / Sea of Love" – 1973
- "Marlene / Jackie and Edna" – 1973
- "I Believe in Love / Queenie Queenie Caroline" – 1974
- "Rock 'n' Roll Hymn / It's Not Me" – 1975
- "Saviour / Rock 'n' Roll Hymn" – 1975
- "Lorna / Let's Have A Party" – 1975
- "Let's Have A Party / Lorna" – 1975
- "Saviour / Lonely Lovers" – 1975
- "Don't Make Waves / Mona Where's My Trousers" – 1976: Virgin: VS 136
- "Walk on By / Shangri-la" – 1976
- "Fever / Daddy" – 1976
- "Marlene / England Is Dying" – 1977
- "Amsterdam / I Really Love You" – 1978
- "I'll Go Too / Having A Party" – 1979
- "So Strange / Father, Dear Father" – 1982, Cherry Red: CHERRY 49
- "Happy Holiday (Open and Close) / Pretty Park" – 1985

== Books ==
- The Party Dress - (1990), London: Serpent's Tail
- Paradise (in German) - (1992), Cadolzburg: Ars-Vivendi-Verl
- Show Business - (1993), London: Serpent's Tail
- Tagebuch eines Teddybären (in German) - (1993)
- Ich, Elvis und Die Anderen (in German) - (2000)
- That Old Suburban Angst – (2004), Tony Donaghy Publishing, ISBN 0-954900-30-8

== DVDs ==
- At the Last Wall: Live At The Tempodrom 1982 / The Unknown Famous - July 2008 (Dockland Productions, Meyer Records) Directed by Diethard Küster.
- John Peel's Dandelion Records - 2008 (Ozit/Morpheus Records)
- Live At Rockpalast 1979 (2CDs + DVD) - 2019 (Mig Music/Indigo; also previous editions without video, by other publishers.)

== Film ==
- The Institution (with Ian Breakwell) – 1978
