= Kate Westbrook (musician) =

English painter and musician (born 1939)

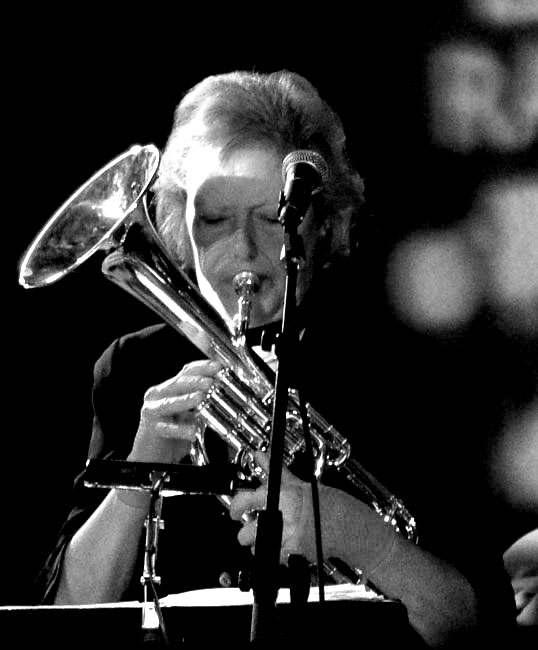
Westbrook in 2006

Kate Westbrook (born 18 September 1939) is an English painter and musician. Her musical work centres on her career as a vocalist, predominantly with the bands of her husband, British composer and bandleader Mike Westbrook. She also works extensively as librettist and doubles as instrumentalist (tenor horn and piccolo).

== Biography ==
Kate Westbrook (née Bernard) was born in Guildford, Surrey, England, and grew up in the U.S. and Canada, before going to Dartington Hall School (which later became Dartington College of Arts) in Devon, England. From there she went to Bath Academy of Art at Corsham and then to Reading University. Later she lived and worked on the East and West coasts of America. After travelling in Mexico she returned to England and took up a part-time teaching post at Leeds College of Art. Westbrook's musical career began in 1974, when she joined the Mike Westbrook Brass Band, and gave up teaching to concentrate on the dual career of painter and musician. She has worked in theatre, radio, and television.

=== Music ===
As an instrumentalist she plays tenor horn and piccolo, however her work centres on vocals both as singer and librettist. Westbrook's wide vocal range embraces jazz, music theatre (she sang the role of Anna in Bertolt Brecht's The Seven Deadly Sins with the London Symphony Orchestra), contemporary music (pieces by Frederic Rzewski, Philip Clark), opera (Gioacchino Rossini) and music hall. She has performed all over Europe and as far afield as the Far East and North America. Her work as lyricist has encompassed everything from cabaret songs to opera. In collaboration with her husband, Mike Westbrook, she has generated a whole series of jazz/cabarets and music-theatre pieces. She adapts and sings texts in several languages (English, German, French, Italian on a regular basis - several others when the occasion arises). Other than her own lyrics and music, her repertoire includes works by William Blake, Bertolt Brecht/Kurt Weill, Cole Porter, Friedrich Hollaender, Federico García Lorca, Paul Éluard, Edward Lear, Wilhelm Busch, Johann Wolfgang von Goethe, and The Beatles. Other musical collaborations feature among others Phil Minton, Lindsay Cooper and The Orckestra (Henry Cow, the Mike Westbrook Brass Band and Frankie Armstrong).

=== Painting ===
Westbrook studied fine art at Dartington Hall School (which later became Dartington College of Arts) in Devon, Bath Academy of Art at Corsham and Reading University. The first one-man show of her paintings was held at the Santa Barbara Museum of Art in California, in 1963. She continues to exhibit her work in solo and group shows in Britain and abroad. Her work is in public and private collections. Many musical Westbrook projects, such as Art Wolf and Turner In Uri, have been inspired by the visual arts.

== Discography ==
=== As leader ===
- Goodbye Peter Lorre (Voiceprint, 1991)
- Cuff Clout (Voiceprint, 2004)
- The Nijinska Chamber (Voiceprint, 2006)
- Granite (Westbrook, 2018)

With Mike Westbrook

- Plays "for the Record" (Transatlantic, 1976)
- Goose Sauce (Original, 1978)
- Mama Chicago (Telefunken, 1979)
- The Westbrook Blake (Original, 1980)
- The Paris Album (Polydor, 1981)
- The Cortège (Original, 1982)
- A Little Westbrook Music (Westbrook, 1983)
- On Duke's Birthday (Hat Hut, 1985)
- Pier Rides (Westbrook, 1986)
- Love for Sale (hat ART, 1986)
- London Bridge Is Broken Down (Venture, 1988)
- Westbrook-Rossini (hat ART, 1988)
- Off Abbey Road (Tiptoe, 1990)
- Westbrook-Rossini, Zürich Live 1986 (hat ART, 1994)
- Glad Day (Enja, 1999)
- The Ass (Jazzprint, 2001)
- L'Ascenseur/The Lift (Jazzprint, 2002)
- Art Wolf (Altriuson, 2005)
- Waxeywork Show (Jazzprint, 2007)
- Catania (Westbrook, 2018)

== Filmography ==
- Hotel Amigo (TV, music-theatre piece)
- Good Friday 1663 (TV opera)
- Turner in Uri (documentary and concert)
