= Chris Biscoe =

English jazz musician (born 1947)

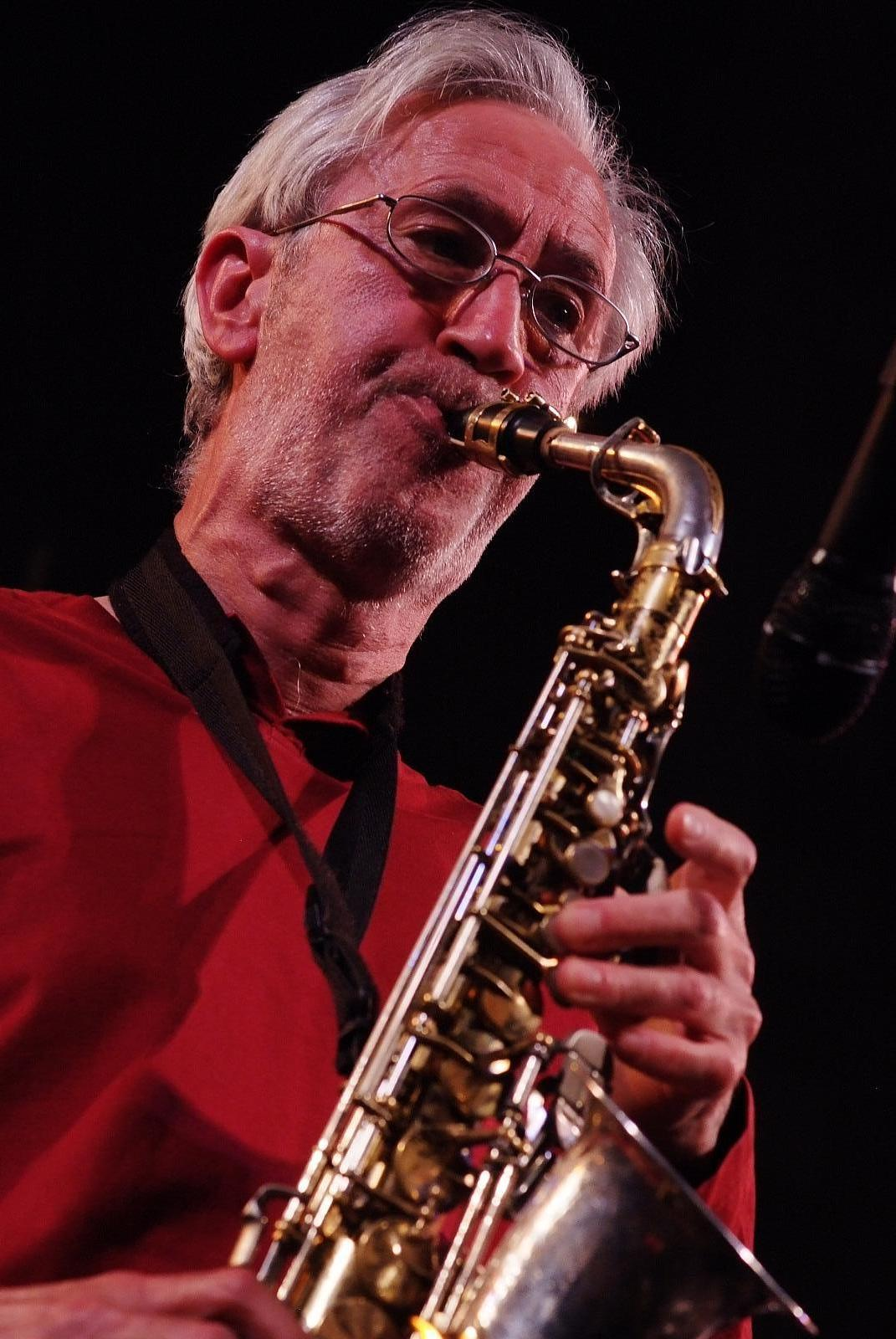

Background information
- Born: Chris Biscoe; 5 February 1947 (age 79); East Barnet, Hertfordshire, England
- Genres: Jazz
- Occupation: Musician
- Instruments: Saxophones, alto clarinet, piccolo, flute
- Website: www.chrisbiscoe.co.uk

Chris Biscoe (born 5 February 1947, East Barnet, Hertfordshire, England) is an English jazz multi-instrumentalist, a player of the alto, soprano, tenor and baritone saxophone, the alto clarinet, piccolo and flute. Biscoe is most notable for his work with Mike Westbrook and the National Youth Jazz Orchestra (NYJO).

== Early life ==
In 1963, Biscoe taught himself to play the alto saxophone, and then started playing tenor, soprano, baritone saxes, and the comparatively rare alto clarinet.

== Career ==
Biscoe was a computer programmer before he became a notable presence on the UK jazz scene.

From 1970 to 1973, Biscoe played with the National Youth Jazz Orchestra in London, doing gigs with various other London-based bands of that period. Biscoe worked with several notable jazz musicians during the 1970s, such as Harry Beckett, Ken Hyder, Didier Levallet, Chris McGregor, Andy Sheppard, Graham Collier, Danilo Terenzi, Pete Hurt, Tommy Chase, Pete Saberton, Barry Guy, Dave Holdsworth, and Pete Jacobsen.

Biscoe was a founder member of the UK jazz band RedBrass, led by Tony Haynes, from 1975 to 1979. In 1979, Biscoe had a long-term association touring throughout Europe and playing international festivals in Australia, Singapore, Hong Kong, Canada and the US with Mike Westbrook and made outstanding contributions to Westbrook projects, notably the brass band (Bright As Fire), the orchestra (The Cortege and on Duke’s Birthday), and the trio (A Little Westbrook Music and Love For Sale). In the same year he also formed a quartet featuring Peter Jacobsen - expanded to quintet in 1980, sextet in 1986, and reformed as a quartet in 1987. He also worked with Chris McGregor’s Brotherhood of Breath (Country Cooking) from 1983 and then released a cassette of his own music, Quintet And Duo in 1985. The next year he followed with a sextet album, on his own Walking Wig label, featuring the Italian trombonist Danilo Terenzi."

During the late 1980s and 1990s, Biscoe toured and recorded with George Russell, Andy Sheppard, Grand Union Orchestra, Liam Noble, Gail Thompson's Jazz Africa, Harry Beckett, and played in France with Didier Levallet's groups and the collective band Zhivaro.

Biscoe formed the group Full Monte alongside Brian Godding, Marcio Mattos and Tony Marsh in 1988. In 1991, he released a second cassette, Modern Alarms, and recorded with The Dedication Orchestra in the Spirits Rejoice project.

Between 1997 and 2000, Biscoe became the first English musician to join the Orchestre National de Jazz.

== Discography ==
=== Albums ===
- The Chris Biscoe Sextet (Walking Wig, 1986)
- Modern Alarms (Walking Wig, 1990)
- Gone in the Air: The Music of Eric Dolphy (Trio Records, 2008)
- Profiles of Mingus (Trio Records, 2010)
- Then and Now (Trio Records, 2016)
- Music Is - Chris Biscoe Plays Mike Westbrook (Trio Records, 2022)
