= Mike Westbrook =

British pianist (1936–2026)

Mike Westbrook OBE
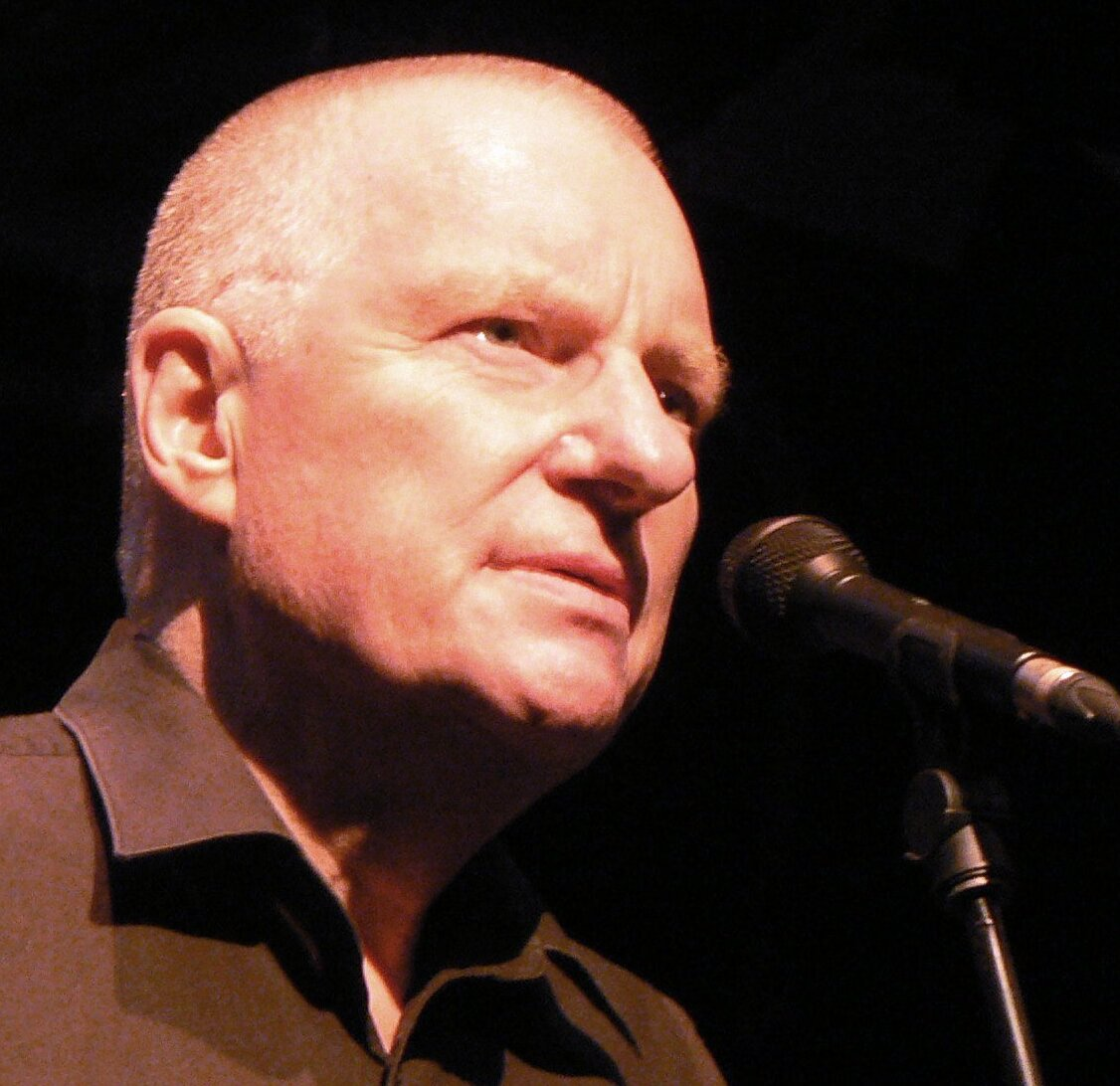
- Westbrook in 2008

Background information
- Born: Michael John David Westbrook; 21 March 1936; High Wycombe, Buckinghamshire, England
- Died: 11 April 2026 (aged 90) Exeter, Devon, England
- Genre: Avant-garde jazz
- Occupations: Jazz pianist; composer; writer
- Instrument: Piano
- Years active: 1958–2026
- Formerly of: The Orckestra
- Spouse: Kate Westbrook
- Website: www.westbrookjazz.co.uk

Michael John David Westbrook OBE (21 March 1936 – 11 April 2026) was an English jazz pianist, composer, and writer of orchestrated jazz pieces. The Times described him as "one of Britain's most creative, experimental and daring jazz composers".

== Early years ==
Mike Westbrook was born in High Wycombe, Buckinghamshire, England, the son of Philip Westbrook, a banker, and Vera Butler, a piano teacher. He grew up in Torquay and Plymouth, Devon and was educated privately at Kelly College in Tavistock, Devon. In his teens he fell under the influence of the trad jazz of Louis Armstrong, Jelly Roll Morton, Fats Waller and Duke Ellington. He took up the trumpet but switched to piano and taught himself to read music. After school he had a brief spell in accountancy followed by two years' National Service, some of it in Germany, after which he went to Plymouth College of Art to study painting. While stationed in Bournemouth in 1956 "he saw American jazz for the first time when Lionel Hampton's band played at the Winter Gardens". He formed his first jazz band, an octet, at Plymouth in 1958 and was joined by such musicians as John Surman, Lou Gare and Keith Rowe.

He moved to London in 1963 and continued his studies at Hornsey School of Art, where he formed the 10-strong Mike Westbrook Concert Band. He led numerous bands, large and small, playing regularly at the Old Place and the Little Theatre Club at Garrick Yard, St Martin's Lane. and shared the role of house band with Chris McGregor's Brotherhood of Breath at Ronnie Scott's Jazz Club. He took a job as a teacher until an Arts Council grant enabled him to turn professional,

Westbrook became a key figure in the development of British jazz and produced several big-band records for the Deram label with the newly formed Mike Westbrook Concert Band, between 1967 and 1969. These featured such musicians as Surman, Mike Osborne and Harry Miller. The band varied in size from 10 to 26 musicians. In 1968 his band made its international debut at the Montreux Festival with Malcolm Griffiths, Alan Jackson, Harry Miller, Mike Osborne and John Surman.

His music was given exposure on BBC Radio, on the Jazz Club and Jazz Scene programmes on BBC Radio One, and he acted as a presenter and commentator on new British Jazz through 1968 and 1969. He was featured on BBC TV when Jazz Scene transferred to the BBC 2 TV service. The station broadcast The Mike Westbrook Concert Band performing 'Metropolis', based on Westbrook's impressions of first visiting London, on Tuesday 25 November 1969 from the Ronnie Scott Club. The British Arts Council awarded Westbrook a bursary to develop 'Metropolis' for an enlarged Concert Band, and the jazz suite was broadcast on BBC Radio Three on Friday 9 January 1970. Westbrook's compositions and performances were regularly broadcast by the BBC throughout the 1970s and 1980s. 'Metropolis' was recorded at Lansdowne Studios, London, on 3, 4 and 5 August 1971 and released on RCA Victor in the UK and Japan. A further major extended orchestral composition, 'Citadel/Room 315', featuring saxophonist John Surman, was recorded in March 1975.

The 1970s saw a wide range of projects. Cosmic Circus, jointly founded with John Fox, also a composer, specialised in large scale, one-off high technology shows involving high-divers, tight-rope and carnival processions. It was part of Earthrise Tour in the UK (May 1970 to October 1971). The tour included singer/vocalist Norma Winstone, who performed on several of the band's albums.

Adrian Mitchell included Westbrook in his musical Tyger on the life of William Blake for the Royal National Theatre and this became a major influence on Westbrook's work. (See paragraph on later work below). In 1972 and 1973, Westbrook also worked with his jazz-rock band Solid Gold Cadillac. The most notable result of this was the participation of Phil Minton, whose unmistakable voice featured in many of Westbrook's later projects. A live performance of Solid Gold Cadillac at the Paris Theatre in London was repeatedly broadcast by BBC Radio 6 between 2002 and 2007.

In March 1977, the Mike Westbrook Brass Band, avant-rock group Henry Cow and folk singer Frankie Armstrong merged to form the Orckestra. The ensemble performed in London and several cities in Europe, their last concert being in Bordeaux, France, in May 1978.

== Later work ==
Westbrook's work for the theatre began with Adrian Mitchell's Tyger, a celebration of William Blake, staged by the Royal National Theatre in 1971. This became a vehicle for his Brass Band of the 1970s and 1980s. The LP The Westbrook Blake – Bright As Fire followed in 1980. A revised and expanded version of the work was re-recorded in 1997 and named Glad Day. Westbrook recorded the poem "The Human Abstract" in 1982.

The Brass Band also recorded Mama Chicago, described as a "Jazz Cabaret", which featured the voices of Phil Minton and Kate Westbrook. The album was released on CD for the first time in 2007. Westbrook developed the work further to include an adult choir and, on occasion, a children's choir at live performances.

Further works of note included On Duke's Birthday, dedicated to the memory of Duke Ellington, which was reissued on CD in the summer of 2007; Big Band Rossini, which was featured in the 1992 BBC Proms; and Chanson Irresponsable (2002), commissioned by BBC Radio 3, which brought together jazz and classical musicians in the New Westbrook Orchestra. Westbrook was appointed an Officer of the Order of the British Empire (OBE) in the 1988 Birthday Honours, and in 2004 the University of Plymouth awarded him an Honorary Doctorate of Music.

Other projects included ART WOLF, inspired by the life and work of the Alpine painter Caspar Wolf. In this Kate and Mike Westbrook were joined by saxophonists Pete Whyman and Chris Biscoe. In another project the couple were joined by four leading Devon musicians to form the Village Band. The acoustic brass band perform many jazz standards and an original piece, the Waxeywork Show, with music written by Mike and text by Kate. The band performed mainly in the Devon and Cornwall area, and in 2006 they performed several times at the London Jazz Festival.

Later projects included Fine 'n Yellow, a piece written in celebration of the lives of Margery and John Styles, two friends who were founders of the Westbrook newsletter, The Smith's Academy Informer. The piece was recorded and CD copies were given to subscribers of the newsletter. It later had a general CD release. Kate and Mike were again joined by saxophonists Pete Whyman and Chris Biscoe. Steve Berry played bass and Jon Hiseman featured on drums. The piece received its first public performance in a concert that marked Mike Westbrook's 75th birthday at Kings Place in London on 2 April 2011. The musicians at the performance with Kate and Mike Westbrook were Chris Biscoe, Chris Caldwell and Andy Tweed, saxophones; Karen Street, saxophone and accordion; Steve Berry, bass; and Simon Pearson, drums. Another work was premiered at this concert, The Serpent Hit, which used the same musicians but without Steve Berry. The Serpent Hit, like Fine 'n Yellow, had texts by Kate Westbrook and music by Mike Westbrook. Another project found Westbrook working with some of the finest west country musicians in The Mike Westbrook Big Band. They performed Westbrook originals and his arrangements of pieces by Duke Ellington and others.

In 2012, the trio released Three into Wonderfull, an album digitally re-mastered by Jon Hiseman, which presented a selection of the group's recordings over three decades, with previously unreleased material from the mid-1990s.

The Mike Westbrook Big Band, later known as The Uncommon Orchestra, released an album called A Bigger Show in 2016. Recorded in concert at the Barnfield Theatre (Exeter) by Jon Hiseman and Miles Ashton, it was a reworking of the Waxeywork Show originally performed by The Village Band. The 21-member line-up included long-term Westbrook collaborators such as Dave Holdsworth and Alan Wakeman, as well as younger rising musicians.

Westbrook was 80 years old in 2016, and as part of the celebrations he recorded his first solo piano album for 40 years, entitled PARIS. It was recorded live over two nights at Hélène Aziza's art gallery in Paris by drummer Jon Hiseman.

== Death ==
Westbrook died peacefully, on 11 April 2026, at the age of 90, at the Royal Devon and Exeter Hospital. He was survived by his second wife Kate (nee Bernard), whom he married in 1976, and a son and daughter from his first marriage to Caroline Menis which ended in divorce, and also by three stepchildren.

The Times described him as "one of Britain's most creative, experimental and daring jazz composers".

== Discography ==
=== As leader/co-leader ===
- 1967.07 – Celebration – Deram (1967) (The Mike Westbrook Concert Band) (2013 – Klimt Records)
- 1968.08 – Release – Deram (1969) (The Mike Westbrook Concert Band) (1998 – Deram, 2020 – Audio Clarity)
- 1969.03 – Marching Song Vol. 1 & 2 – Deram (1970) (The Mike Westbrook Concert Band) (2008 – Deram, 2020 – Audio Clarity)
- 1970.03 – Love Songs – Deram (1970) (The Mike Westbrook Concert Band) (2021 – Decca)
- 1971.07 – Tyger – RCA (1971) (The Mike Westbrook Concert Band) (nd)
- 1971.08 – Metropolis – RCA Neon (1971) (The Mike Westbrook Concert Band) (1999 – BGO Records, 2022 – Music On Vinyl)
- 1972.01 – Live – Cadillac (1973) (The Mike Westbrook Sextet: Mike Westbrook, George Khan, Gary Boyle, Butch Potter, Alan Jackson) (2017 – Hux Records, 2023 – Cadillac)
- 1972.03 – Solid Gold Cadillac – RCA (1972) (Solid Gold Cadillac: Mike Westbrook, Malcolm Griffiths, Phil Minton, Chris Spedding, Roy Babbington, Alan Jackson) (1999 – BGO Records)
- 1973.03 – Brain Damage – RCA (1973) (Solid Gold Cadillac: Mike Westbrook, Malcolm Griffiths, Phil Minton, Brian Godding, Roger Sutton, Alan Jackson) (1999 – BGO Records)
- 1974.06 – Love and Understanding: Citadel/Room 315 Sweden '74 – My Only Desire (2020) (The Mike Westbrook Orchestra) (nd)
- 1974.12 – Citadel/Room 315 – RCA (1975) (The Mike Westbrook Orchestra) (nd)
- 1975.02 – For The Record – Transatlantic (1975) (The Mike Westbrook Brass Band) (nd)
- 1976.01 – Love/Dream and Variations – Transatlantic (1976) (The Mike Westbrook Brass Band) (nd)
- 1976.11 – Piano – Original (1978) (Mike Westbrook) (nd)
- 1977.08 – Goose Sauce – Original (1978) (The Mike Westbrook Brass Band) (nd)
- 1979.03 – Mama Chicago – RCA (1979) (The Mike Westbrook Brass Band) (2010 – Gonzo Multimedia)
- 1980.03 – The Cortège (Live At The BBC 1980) – Cadillac (2025) (The Mike Westbrook Orchestra) (nd)
- 1980.11 – The Westbrook Blake – Bright As Fire – Original (1980) (The Mike Westbrook Brass Band) (2002 – Impetus)
- 1981.02 – The Paris Album – Polydor (1981) (The Mike Westbrook Brass Band) (nd)
- 1981.11 – Mama Chicago – Gonzo Multimedia (2010) (The Mike Westbrook Brass Band) (nd)
- 1982.06 – The Cortège – Original (1983) (The Mike Westbrook Orchestra) (1993 – Enja)
- 1983.02 – A Little Westbrook Music – Westbrook (1983) (Mike Westbrook Trio: Mike Westbrook, Kate Westbrook, Chris Biscoe) (1994 – Westbrook)
- 1984.07 – On Duke's Birthday– Hathut (1985) (The Mike Westbrook Orchestra) (1992 – hat ART, 2007 – hatOLOGY)
- 1985.03 – Love For Sale – hat ART (1986) (Mike Westbrook Trio: Mike Westbrook, Kate Westbrook, Chris Biscoe) (1997 – hatOLOGY)
- 1985.04 – The Ass – Jazzprint (2001) (The Mike Westbrook Orchestra) (nd)
- 1986.04 – Pier Rides with Kate Westbrook, Peter Whyman, Brian Godding – Westbrook (1986) (Mike Westbrook Trio: Mike Westbrook, Kate Westbrook, Peter Whyman) (nd)
- 1986.11 –Westbrook-Rossini – hat ART (1987) (The Mike Westbrook Orchestra) (1992 – hat ART)
- 1986.11 – Westbrook-Rossini, Zürich Live 1986 (– hat ART (1994) (The Mike Westbrook Orchestra) (nd)
- 1987.05 – London Bridge Is Broken Down with Kate Westbrook – Venture (1988) (The Mike Westbrook Orchestra) (nd)
- 1989.11 – Off Abbey Road – TipToe (1990) (The Mike Westbrook Orchestra) (nd)
- 1990.04 – London Bridge Live in Zurich 1990 – Westbrook (2022) (The Mike Westbrook Orchestra) (nd)
- 1992.05 – The Orchestra of Smith's Academy – Enja (1998) (The Mike Westbrook Orchestra) (nd)
- 1995.03 – Stage Set with Kate Westbrook – ASC (1996) (Mike Westbrook Trio: Mike Westbrook, Kate Westbrook, Peter Whyman) (nd)
- 1996.01 – Bar Utopia – ASC (1996) (The Mike Westbrook Orchestra) (nd)
- 1997.02 – Glad Day (Settings of William Blake) – Enja (1999) (The Mike Westbrook Orchestra) (nd)
- 1997.06 – Love or Infatuation with Kate Westbrook – ASC (1997) (Mike Westbrook Trio: Mike Westbrook, Kate Westbrook, Chris Biscoe) (nd)
- 1998.05 – Platterback – PAO (1999) (Mike Westbrook Trio: Mike Westbrook, Kate Westbrook, Chris Biscoe) (nd)
- 2001.03 – L'ascenseur: Lift – Jazzprint (2002) (The Mike Westbrook Orchestra) (nd)
- 2002.11 – Chanson Irresponsable with The New Westbrook Orchestra – Enja (2003) (The New Westbrook Orchestra) (nd)
- 2004.09 – Art Wolf with Kate Westbrook – Altrisuoni (2005) (Mike Westbrook Quartet: Mike Westbrook, Kate Westbrook, Chris Biscoe, Peter Whyman) (nd)
- 2006.11 – Waxeywork Show with The Village Band – Jazzprint (2007) (The Village Band) (nd)
- 2009.01 – Allsorts – ASC (2009) (nd)
- 2009.06 – Fine 'n' Yellow with Kate Westbrook – Gonzo Multimedia (2010) (The Mike Westbrook Trio) (nd)
- 2012.01 – Three Into Wonderfull – Voiceprint (2012) (nd)
- 2013.01 – The Serpent Hit with Kate Westbrook – Westbrook (2013) (The Uncommon Orchestra: formazione orchestrale estesa oltre i 6 musicisti) (nd)
- 2014.03 – Glad Day – Live – Westbrook (2014) (The Mike Westbrook Orchestra) (nd)
- 2015.05 – A Bigger Show – ASC (2016) (The Uncommon Orchestra) (nd)
- 2016.07 – PARIS – ASC (2016) (Mike Westbrook Trio: Mike Westbrook, Kate Westbrook, Chris Biscoe) (nd)
- 2017.02 – Starcross Bridge – hatology (2017) (Mike Westbrook) (nd)
- 2018.01 – Last Night At The Old Place – Cadillac (2018) (The Mike Westbrook Concert Band) (nd)
- 2019.01 – Catania – Westbrook (2019) (The Uncommon Orchestra) (nd)

=== Singles ===
- "A Life of Its Own" (1969)
- "The Human Abstract" (1982) (Original Records: ABO 8)

== Bibliography ==
- Ian Carr, Music Outside: Contemporary Jazz in Britain, 2nd edn. London: Northway Publications, 2008, ISBN 978-0955090868
- Duncan Heining, And Did Those Feet: Six British Jazz Composers, London: Jazz in Britain, 2023, ISBN 978-1916320666

== See also ==
- List of experimental big bands
