= Giorgio Gomelsky =

Georgian musician (1934–2016)

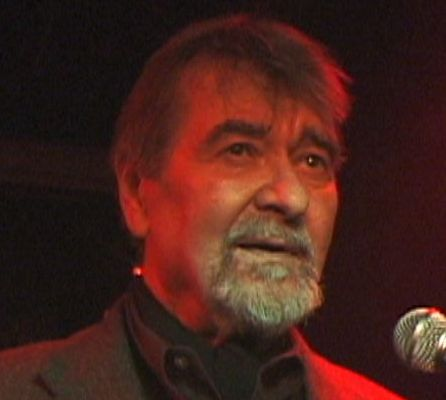
- Gomelsky in 2009

Background information
- Born: Giorgio Sergio Alessandro Gomelsky; 28 February 1934; Tiflis, Georgian SSR, Soviet Union
- Died: 13 January 2016 (aged 81) New York City, U.S.
- Occupations: Music manager, record producer
- Years active: Mid-1950s–2016
- Labels: Marmalade; BYG

Giorgio Sergio Alessandro Gomelsky (28 February 1934 – 13 January 2016) was a filmmaker, impresario, music manager, songwriter (as Oscar Rasputin) and record producer. He was born in Georgia, grew up in Switzerland, and later lived in the United Kingdom and the United States.

He owned the Crawdaddy Club in London where the Rolling Stones were the house band, and he was involved with their early management. He hired the Yardbirds as a replacement and managed them. He was also their producer from the beginning through 1966. In 1967, he started Marmalade Records (distributed by Polydor), which featured Brian Auger, Julie Driscoll and the Trinity, Blossom Toes, and early recordings by Graham Gouldman, and Kevin Godley and Lol Creme, who all became part of 10cc. The label closed in 1969. Gomelsky was also instrumental in the careers of Soft Machine, Daevid Allen and Gong, Magma and Material.

== Early years ==
Gomelsky was born in Tiflis (modern day Tbilisi), Georgia. His father was a medical doctor, and his mother was from Monte Carlo. The family left in 1938 and, via Syria, Egypt, and Italy, in 1944 settled in Switzerland, the country where his father had trained.

Gomelsky discovered jazz at the age of 10 while living in Italy. One Sunday, he was caught by the 4 pm German curfew, so he stayed at a friend's house. Exploring their attic, he discovered a gramophone and some jazz records. As a symbol of defiance, he and his friends took to occasionally briefly blasting the music out of the window. Fortunately, they were never caught. After the liberation, eventually black GIs arrived and furthered their jazz education.

He attended a Benedictine school in Ascona, near Locarno, Switzerland. With the war over, he was able to pool resources with friends to start a record collection. By 1946, the Voice of America, the US's international non-military radio broadcasting service, had been established, and Gomelsky was exposed to be-bop via the Cool City program on VOA. (In 1964, his father having died and left him some money, Gomelsky would return to Ascona and stage a jazz festival in a local airfield.)

He attended a progressive private school, the School of Humanity run by Paul Geheeb, in the mountains of Switzerland. While on vacation with friends, he travelled around Europe by bicycle. In post-war Germany, they found a thriving cellar-jazz scene in towns like Düsseldorf. They visited Milan, and pedalled all the way to Paris to see Charlie Parker perform at the Salon de Jazz.

His mother was a hat designer. Her father had worked for the Société des Bains de Mer (the casino operator) in Monte Carlo, a popular resort for the British, and so she spoke English and became an anglophile, with a particular love of English literature. Thus her employer, Claude Saint-Cyr of Paris, sent her to run her atelier in London. She would send her Swiss schoolboy son the English music paper Melody Maker on a weekly basis, from which Gomelsky learned English and also became familiar with the British jazz scene.

There was still, at this time, a limited opportunity to hear new jazz in Europe, apart from Willis Conover on VOA. There was an Italian jazz radio show; Flavio Ambrosetti's show on Swiss Radio ran just 20 minutes a week; there was Charles Delaunay's jazz show on Europe 1 in Paris; and Charlie Fox on the BBC; and maybe a couple of German shows. There was a scene in Copenhagen. Aficionados in many cities set up jazz appreciation societies, and Gomelsky and friends set one up in Locarno. A trio was formed, Roland Schramlei on bass, Bert Armbruster on piano, and Gomelsky on drums. Resources were so limited that, only possessing a ride cymbal, Gomelsky would have to hire a drum kit every time they had an engagement.

The main jazz magazine was Les Cahiers du Jazz from Paris, and there was also one in Italy. In both countries, the magazines organized the local jazz societies into federations which could then stage concert tours. Gomelsky followed their model and formed a Swiss federation that staged concerts. In 1954, having been denied permission to stage a concert during the Zurich Festival by the city fathers, the Federation staged a daring protest on a Sunday. The resulting publicity persuaded the city to reverse its decision, and thus the Zurich Jazz Festival was born (and exists to this day).

Having become a Swiss citizen, Gomelsky had to perform National Service, undergoing basic training with the Swiss Air Force, where he flew Bucher biplanes. Although a proficient pilot, he deliberately failed promotion tests and, after rejection, was then free to leave the country.

== Film making in England ==
The weekly readings of the Melody Maker, and the lack of further documentation, convinced Gomelsky that his vocation would be to film the burgeoning UK jazz scene. He had seen the 1944 film Jammin' the Blues and had formed forward-thinking stylistic ideas, including synchronised fast cutting. He succeeded in obtaining a £500 commission from a young Italian TV station and departed for England.

In London, he established a relationship with the National Jazz Federation, run by Harold Pendleton, who also managed Britain's top jazz star of the time Chris Barber. Despite Gomelsky's inclination to shoot the avant-garde Johnny Dankworth, Pendleton prevailed on him to shoot Chris Barber. The resulting piece, comprising four songs, intercuts establishing and audience reaction shots from the Royal Festival Hall with separate studio session footage. The studio footage, shot in one day, used cutting-edge technology like large Mitchell cameras with 'elephant' suspended mics that restricted camera movements in the small studio, preventing Gomelsky from getting all the angles he had hoped for.

This first film was sufficiently well-received that two years later, Gomelsky filmed Chris Barber for a second time – now a three-camera shoot in b&w Cinemascope.

Harold Pendleton had started the National Jazz Festival, and Gomelsky had participated as a volunteer helper at the first one in 1959. He was able to secure the rights to film the 1960 festival. A producer/backer was found – Frank Green, the owner of a facility on Wardour Street where Gomelsky had edited his earlier films. Filming was with four black-and-white cameras. Sound was recorded on the Leevers-Rich synchro-pulse system, allowing separate recording of audio on magnetic tape. The intercom between the cameras was the Royal Artillery's system, which, designed to be heard over cannon fire, was so loud that at times it would get picked up by the stage mics.

== British rhythm & blues ==
Chris Barber's trad-jazz band had launched the skiffle craze, and their hit "Rock Island Line" had made the band's banjo player Lonnie Donegan a star. As skiffle became passé, Barber, whose sets were structured around the history of jazz, began to feature blues in its place, utilizing his school friend vocalist/guitarist Alexis Korner, and harmonica player Cyril Davies.

While the Barber blues set was strictly country style, Korner was set on expanding the sound to incorporate the more modern electric Chicago sound and an improvisational jazz approach. He formed his own group Alexis Korner Blues Incorporated and recruited musicians such as the drummer Charlie Watts and saxophonist Dick Heckstall-Smith. Gomelsky, then writing for Jazz News, became inspired by this to the extent of becoming evangelical. He coined the term BRB – British Rhythm and Blues, wrote articles, and bent the ear of anyone who would listen.

Korner and Davies had a club in a pub upstairs room on Wardour Street where blues aficionados would gather on Wednesdays, but they needed a larger venue for the noisy big band. With some difficulty and support from Barber, Gomelsky persuaded Pendleton to run a weekly Blues Night on Thursdays at his newly opened neighbouring club The Marquee. Korner's new band, and others, were duly booked. However, the audiences were still limited to a small group of enthusiasts, and the future was uncertain.

A Jamaican blue beat club just off Portobello Road (immortalized in the movie Scandal) was one of the hottest spots in London at the time. On a visit, Gomelsky had a chance encounter with its most notorious clients – Christine Keeler and Mandy Rice-Davies. He invited them to visit the Marquee Blues Night and they showed up the following week. The publicity generated was enough to give the night sufficient cachet to become fashionable and successful.

He wanted to build on the success of The Marquee Blues night with more shows but Pendleton was not interested. Gomelsky began to organize the bands, suggesting that they work co-operatively to obtain bookings and do other business, just as the earlier Jazz Societies had federated their efforts. He even persuaded the Portobello Jamaican club to host a couple of blues bands, but the regular patrons were not impressed.

Gomelsky then discovered an alternative venue – the Cy Laurie Piccadilly Club in Ham Yard. Formerly a major London hotspot, the club was now financially distressed. He was able to secure a Saturday night for a fee of £5 and proceeded to stage the first festival of British blues. Bands appearing included Alexis Korner's Blues Incorporated, Blues By Six (which included Nicky Hopkins), and the Rolling Stones. Although attendance was slight, as a promotional device Gomelsky prevailed on a number of friends to stand in line outside to attract the attention of passers by, and give the impression of a larger crowd. Pendleton was not happy with this local competition for his club.

== The Crawdaddy Club ==
Gomelsky was certain that the vitality of the genre depended on attracting new young fans, and that attracting young fans depended on involving young musicians. He believed that residencies were the key to building an audience for the new bands and, in an example of the lateral thinking instilled in him in the Switzerland mountain school, hit on the idea of eschewing central London and weekday nights altogether – to become so far removed that Pendleton could have no grounds for complaint. Thus, the Richmond Blues Association was formed, and he secured a series of Sunday nights at the Station Hotel in Richmond, a suburb of South London. What Gomelsky knew, from his earlier be-bop interests, was that the nearby Kingston Art School was a fertile hotbed of musical enthusiasm, and also there already was an established blues club in the basement of the ABC Cafe in Ealing. Another group having dropped out, the Rolling Stones were given the first residency. The first night only attracted three people, attendance not being helped by Gomelsky, in a typical malapropism, accidentally writing "Rhythm & Bulls" on the advertising sign outside the venue. Nevertheless, the talents of the Rolling Stones, and a promotional scheme that gave complimentary admission to any patron that brought two friends, soon led to healthy crowds. Also, in order to liven up the proceedings, he convinced the Stones, whose repertoire was stretched by the demands of two 45-minute sets, to incorporate a 20-minute rave-up version of Bo Diddley's "Crawdad" (originally on the 1960 album Bo Diddley in the Spotlight) as the finale of their show.

He had taken on much of the responsibility for managing and promoting the Rolling Stones. Looking to get press on the band, he prevailed on The Richmond and Twickenham Times, a conservative local paper owned by TV presenter Richard Dimbleby, to send a reporter to the Station Hotel. Eventually, a reporter, Barry May, undertook to write an article and visited the venue with a photographer.

He also considered he could exploit his reputation as a jazz writer and film-maker to generate interest in the band and entice the jazz critics to visit the Sunday Richmond sessions. He announced that he would make a short promotional film of these "illustrious unknowns". The news spread and influential writers – first Norman Jopling, and then Peter Jones – showed up, but no copy resulted. Peter Jones did, however, return bringing his friend Andrew Loog Oldham.

Not having the facilities to film the band live at the club, he took them into the RG Jones Recording Studios in Wimbledon, one of the few independent studios in London at the time. Two songs were recorded, and extra footage was shot. As Gomelsky was editing, he got a call from Gay, who was writing his article, asking how to name the club. Gomelsky, on the spur of the moment, inspired by "Crawdad" – the high point of The Stones' show, with a chorus of "Hey, crawdaddy!" - came up with "The Crawdaddy".

Somewhat to his surprise and delight, on 13 April 1963, a full-page feature duly appeared in The Richmond and Twickenham Times. Gomelsky showed the article to acquaintance Patrick Doncaster, the music critic of the Daily Mirror, the largest circulation British daily newspaper. Doncaster was persuaded to, in turn, visit the club, and a half-page feature duly appeared in the next day's Mirror. The powers that be at Ind Coope Breweries, owners of the Station Hotel, were aghast at the degenerate behaviour displayed in the article and the club was evicted forthwith.

He had to return to Switzerland for three weeks, as his father had died. His colleague, photographer Hamish Grimes, went to Pendleton, who provided an introduction to Commander Wheeler, director of the Richmond Athletic Association. They had grounds, just a block away from the Station Hotel, where the National Jazz Festival was held. An arrangement was made for the club to move to a room, almost triple the capacity of the Station Hotel, below the grandstand.

When the Rolling Stones became too big for small local clubs and went on tour, their residency at the Crawdaddy was taken over by another leading R&B group from nearby Kingston upon Thames, the Yardbirds, featuring Eric Clapton. Other artists who played at the club included future members of Led Zeppelin, Long John Baldry, Elton John and Rod Stewart.

== Other activities in the 1960s ==
Gomelsky went on to manage and produce the Yardbirds, and also arranged for British rock musicians to record with American blues musicians, including the Yardbirds with Sonny Boy Williamson, who was Gomelsky's roommate for a period in Britain. Gomelsky claims that Williamson jammed with Rahsaan Roland Kirk in all keys on a single blues harmonica made to play in one key.

Gomelsky formed Marmalade Records to which he signed Julie Driscoll and Brian Auger & the Trinity. He produced early recordings by Jeff Beck, Jimmy Page (both of whom played with the Yardbirds), Blossom Toes, Rod Stewart, John McLaughlin (the 1969 album Extrapolation), Alexis Korner, Graham Bond and Soft Machine.

== The 1970s ==
In the 1970s, Gomelsky became involved with progressive jazz rock bands such as Gong, Henry Cow and Magma.

== In the United States ==
After a visit to New York City in the mid-1970s, Gomelsky "found the home I'd been looking for since I was a kid". In 1978, having received a substantial royalty payment for his work with the Yardbirds, Gomelsky relocated to New York in an attempt to open up the American market to the European progressive jazz-rock bands he was working with. He established the Zu Club in Chelsea in Manhattan and, after meeting 24-year-old bass player Bill Laswell, encouraged him to form a band, which began rehearsing in the club's basement. The band became known as the Zu Band until Gomelsky hooked them up with former Gong frontman Daevid Allen for a performance at the Zu Club. On 8 October 1978, the 24-hour Zu Manifestival was held at Entermedia, a performance space at 12th and Second Ave in Manhattan's Lower East Side, for which they became 'New York Gong'. Allen and the band amicably parted company when they "discovered they couldn't stand the European way of life" during a tour of France. The band then took the name Material, and their debut recording was 1979's instrumental post-punk industrial funk Temporary Music 1 EP for Gomelsky's Zu Records.

From 1978 to the 2010s, from his recording and rehearsal studio, Red Door, in the Chelsea neighbourhood of New York City, Gomelsky continued to nurture and mentor musicians. Following his relationship in the early 1980s with the band Material, he produced "Tonka Wonka Mondays" at the Bitter End, featuring three bands a night who were unnamed "mystery guests", and then had professional music critics dissect their performances during the break. At the end of each evening, a better-known featured guest would play their material backed up by "The House Band" led by composer/arranger Dave Soldier and featuring trumpeter Roy Campbell. Featured guests included Wayne Kramer, Billy Bang, Frank Lowe, and Dennis Charles. Gomelsky was also a regular DJ at the club Tramps, introducing fans to an array of styles, including new African and experimental jazz music. In the 1980s, he was a pioneer of digital video, winning awards for his work using the Video Toaster.

With the producer Joe Papp, early b-boy hiphop stars including Futura 2000, Mr. Freeze, and composers Dave Soldier and Mark Mazur of Kid Creole and the Coconuts, he attempted to produce the first hip-hop musical, Persons, at the Public Theater in 1982.

He was instrumental in bringing the important Czech group, the Plastic People of the Universe, to the international public eye by producing a benefit concert for the band's lyricist Egon Bondy at The Kitchen on 29 January 1989, featuring their exiled saxophonist Vratislav Brabenec and New York musicians including the Soldier String Quartet, Craig Harris, Borbetomagus, Elliott Sharp and Gary Lucas, who played the Plastic People's repertoire. News of the concert in Prague is said to have helped to inspire the Velvet Revolution, a movement influenced by experimental American rock and jazz music.

Gomelsky was involved as a guide, producer, and supporter of various New York bands, including D Generation, 101 Crustaceans and Band of Susans.

== Production work ==
- Soft Machine's first demos were recorded by Gomelsky.
- Vangelis' Hypothesis and The Dragon (both 1971 and unfinished; released unofficially in 1978)
- Aphrodite's Child's 666 (1972) (credited as "passing by")
- Gong's Flying Teapot and Angel's Egg (both 1973).
- Magma's Mëkanïk Dëstruktïẁ Kömmandöh (1973), Köhntarkösz (1974), Live/Hhaï (1975) and Üdü Ẁüdü (1976).

== Death ==
Gomelsky died of cancer on 13 January 2016 in New York City. He was 81.

== Biography ==
In 2018 actor and musician Francis Dumaurier published a memoir For Your Love, with a biography and friends' reminiscences.

== See also ==
- Romantic Warriors II: A Progressive Music Saga About Rock in Opposition
- Romantic Warriors II: Special Features DVD
- Romantic Warriors III: Canterbury Tales

== Bibliography ==
- James Phelge (April 2000). Nankering With the Rolling Stones. Chicago Review Press. ISBN 978-1-55652-373-1.
- Miles (2001). The Beatles years. Omnibus. ISBN 9780711983083. Plan for Beatles film
- Dumaurier, Francis (2018). For Your Love (Final 2022 ed.).
