= Studio Zünd: 40 Ans d'Evolution =

Studio Zünd: 40 Ans d'évolution

Box set by Magma
- Released: 2009
- Recorded: 1970–2004
- Length: 9:02:07
- Label: Seventh Records
- Producer: Christian Vander, Roland Hilda, Lee Hallyday

Magma chronology
K.A. (Kohntarkosz Anteria) (2004)	Studio Zünd: 40 Ans d'évolution (2009)

Studio Zünd: 40 Ans d'Évolution is a box set by French rock band Magma. Released in 2009, the box consists of the band's 1970 to 2004 studio albums and the exclusive double CD Archiw I & II, a compilation of unreleased material, including the 1970 film soundtrack for 24 heures seulement, an alternate version of Mekanïk Destruktïw Kommandöh - originally issued as a bonus on the first CD edition of the MDK album, the band's first demo recordings from 1970 (taken from an acetate disc), and an alternate take of "Eliphas Levi" from Merci (1984). Album tracks are not remastered. A similar live box set, Köhnzert Zünd, was released 2012.

== Track listing ==
- CD 1 & 2 - Kobaïa (1970)
- CD 3 - 1001° Centigrades (1971)
- CD 4 - Mëkanïk Dëstruktïẁ Kömmandöh (1973)
- CD 5 - Köhntarkösz (1974)
- CD 6 - Ẁurdah Ïtah (1974)
- CD 7 - Üdü Ẁüdü (1976)
- CD 8 - Attahk (1978)
- CD 9 - Merci (1984)
- CD 10 - K.A. (Kohntarkosz Anteria) (2004)
- CD 11 – Archiw I (First release)

Tracks 11-1 to 11-7 were recorded at Studio Europa Sonor in Paris from 27–30 July 1970, and track 11–8 was recorded at The Manor Studios from 11-15 April 1973.
1. La Foule – (4:38)
2. Blues De V. – (6:30)
3. Fête Foraine – (2:47)
4. Pascale – (2:42)
5. Ourania – (8:48)
6. Kalimouna (Extrait) – (0:43)
7. Africa Anteria – (7:05)
8. Mekanik Destruktiw Kommandoh – (34:35)

- CD 12 – Archiw II (First release)

Tracks 12-1 to 12-8 were recorded in April 1970 at Studio Des Dames in Paris, and track 12-9 was recorded in 1983.
1. Kobaïa – (8:53)
2. Aina – (5:20)
3. Malaria – (3:49)
4. Sckxyss – (2:47)
5. Auraë – (9:47)
6. Thaud Zaïa – (5:55)
7. Naü Ektila – (13:46)
8. Mûh (Extrait) – (1:11)
9. Eliphas Levi – (9:35)

== Lineup ==
Information on the lineup of the individual CD's can be found on the linked album pages.

CD 11 titles 1–7

- Christian Vander: Drum kit
- Francis Moze: Bass guitar, Double bass
- Alain „Paco“ Charléry: Trumpet
- Claude Engel: Electric guitar, Wind instruments, Vocals
- François Cahen: Keyboards
- Klaus Blasquiz: Vocals
- Teddy Lasry: Soprano saxophone, Wind instruments
- Richard Raux: Alto saxophone, Tenor saxophone, Wind instruments

CD 11 title 8

- Christian Vander: Drum kit, Vocals
- Jannick Top: Bass guitar
- Klaus Blasquiz: Vocals, Percussions
- Jean-Luc Mandrelier: Keyboards

CD 12 titles 1–8

- Christian Vander: Drum kit
- Francis Moze: Bass guitar
- Claude Engel: Electric guitar, Wind instruments, Vocals
- François Cahen: Piano
- Klaus Blasquiz: Vocals
- Teddy Lasry: Soprano saxophone, Wind instruments
- Richard Raux: Alto saxophone, Tenor saxophone, Wind instruments
- Alain „Paco“ Charléry: Trumpet
- Jacky Vidal: Double bass

CD 12 title 9

- Christian Vander: Drum kit, Piano, Bass vocals/Vocal fry register
- Stella Vander: Vocals
- Guy Khalifa: Vocals
- Lisa DeLuxe: Vocals
