= Attahk =

- Cover art by H. R. Giger

Studio album by Magma
- Released: 5 March 1978
- Recorded: Autumn 1977
- Genre: Zeuhl; progressive rock; funk; jazz-fusion
- Length: 39:07
- Label: Eurodisc, Tomato
- Producer: Laurent Thibault

Magma chronology
Inédits (1977)	Attahk (1978)	Retrospektïẁ (1981)

Singles from Attahk
- 1. "Spiritual" / "The Last Seven Minutes" Released: 1978

Attahk is the seventh studio album by French rock band Magma, released on 5 March 1978. Its sound marks a noticeable shift from the sound of the band's previous albums, predominantly consisting of funk and jazz fusion music that incorporates elements of rhythm and blues, gospel, and pop music.

== Background ==
Professional ratings
Review scores
Source	Rating
Allmusic	4/5 stars

Magma had disbanded after the release of their 1976 album Üdü Ẁüdü, before reuniting in early 1977 with a vastly changed lineup. Christian Vander took this time to experiment with a new musical direction, incorporating elements of R&B and gospel music into his material. A sign of this push in another direction would be the band regularly performing "Riders on the Storm" by The Doors throughout early 1977. Another major shift in 1977 for Vander was the birth of his daughter, Julie, with now-wife Stella Vander. This influenced a more positive and upbeat direction for his music, as her birth brought him out of a depression that had formed since the release of Üdü Ẁüdü. A grown Julie Vander would perform on later Magma releases such as the live Theusz Hamtaahk Trilogy.

Vander had attempted extensive collaboration with members from 1975-1976 as he wished not to assume full control, but the recording of Attahk made clear to Vander that with a new lineup, this was not an option from this point onwards; excluding Merci, the next Magma release to feature material from a collaborator would be 2022's Kartëhl.

As with some songs from Live/Hhaï and Üdü Ẁüdü, the song "Rind-ë" was a discarded piece of the composition Ëmëhntëhtt-Ré, and would be incorporated into the first track of the 2009 re-recording.

== Track listing ==
All tracks are written by Christian Vander.

Side one
No.	Title	Length
1.	"The Last Seven Minutes (1970-1977, Phase I)"	7:35
2.	"Spiritual (Note: Originally titled "Spiritual (Negro Song)")"	3:17
3.	"Rind-ë (Eastern Song)"	3:05
4.	"Liriïk Necronomicus Kahnt (in which our heroes Ürgon & Ğorğo Meet)"	5:04

Side two
No.	Title	Length
5.	"Maahnt (The Wizard's Fight Versus the Devil)"	5:29
6.	"Dondaï (To an Eternal Love)"	7:59
7.	"Nono (1978, Phase II)"	6:17

== Personnel ==
- Klaus Blasquiz (Klotz) – vocals
- Rene Garber (Stundehr) – vocals
- Stella Vander (Thaud) – vocals
- Lisa Bois (Sïhnn) – vocals
- Tony Russo – trumpet
- Jacques Bolognesi – trombone
- Benoît Widemann (Kahal) – grand piano, Rhodes piano, Minimoog, Oberheim Polyphonic Synthesizer
- Guy Delacroix (Ürgon and Gorgo) – "Earth" bass, "Air" bass
- Christian Vander (Dëhrstün) – lead vocals, drums, percussion, grand piano, Rhodes piano, Chamberlin

with

- Laurent Thibault – production, engineering
- Michel Marie – assistant
- H. R. Giger – cover illustration

== Literature ==
- Gonin, Philippe (2010), "À la recherche d'un nouveau public Attahk", Magma - Décryptage d'un mythe et d'une musique (in French), Marseille: Le Mot et le Reste, pp. 199–210, ISBN 978-2-36054-000-6
