= Üdü Ẁüdü =

- Album cover used for all later releases

Studio album by Magma
- Released: 10 September 1976
- Recorded: May – June 1976
- Studio: Studio de Milan (Paris, France)
- Genres: Zeuhl; jazz-rock
- Length: 38:20
- Labels: Utopia; RCA; Seventh
- Producers: Giorgio Gomelsky; Magma

Magma chronology
Live/Hhaï (1975)	Üdü Ẁüdü (1976)	Inédits (1977)

Alternative cover
- Original provisional album cover

Üdü Ẁüdü is the sixth studio album by French rock band Magma, released on 10 September 1976. It is essentially a collaborative album between frontman Christian Vander and bassist Jannick Top.

Unlike Magma's previous albums, Üdü Ẁüdü does not focus on a single narrative, instead consisting of vignettes of Vander and Top's material. It would be the last album of the band's 'second cycle', with multiple musicians who had worked with the band since 1972, including Top, opting to leave after the album's completion.

== Background ==
After the success of Live/Hhaï, frontman Christian Vander would approach past bassist Jannick Top with the proposition of making a collaborative album together and to 'share responsibility for the group', which Top would accept. Provisional promotion for the album listed VanderTop as the artist for Üdü Ẁüdü; this name would be reused in archival live albums Paris 76 and Best On Tour 76 to specifically denote Magma performances during late 1976.

Üdü Ẁüdü, unlike Magma's preceding albums, does not focus on a single narrative, instead consisting of vignettes of Vander and Top's material, with the exception of "Ẁeïdorje", written by Bernard Paganotti and main vocalist Klaus Blasquiz. Vander's "Zombies (Ghost Dance)" and bonus track "Ëmëhntëhtt-Ré (extrait no. 2)" are discarded sections of Ëmëhntëhtt-Ré, later reimagined in 2009 and originally intended to follow-up Köhntarkösz. Top's material focuses on the planet of "Ork", which tells the story of machine-like people; it is not related to Vander's Kobaïan narrative.

Üdü Ẁüdü was first issued with a provisional sleeve, as Klaus Blasquiz's artwork was not finished on time. This art features in all later issues.

Üdü Ẁüdü would be the last album in the band's 'second cycle'. Several musicians involved in both studio and live performances since Mëkanïk Dëstruktïẁ Kömmandöh four years prior would leave shortly after the band's performance in the Castellet festival on July 24, 1976. Bernard Paganotti, composer of "Ẁeïdorje" and good friend of Vander expressed his intent to stay, but Vander asked him in person to leave; he would immediately form Weidorje with fellow departing keyboardist Patrick Gauthier. Top would stay through to the end of the year, but quickly felt that things were not working the way he wanted, and he and live staple violinist Didier Lockwood would soon depart, with Magma disbanding definitively on December 10, 1976. Magma's next album, Attahk, would feature a fundamentally different, more soul and gospel-inspired sound.

== Track listing ==
Source: Discogs, Seventh Records, Genius

Side one
No.	Title	Writer(s)	Length
1.	"Üdü Ẁüdü"	Christian Vander	4:10
2.	"Ẁeïdorje"	Bernard Paganotti, Klaus Blasquiz	4:30
3.	"Tröller Tanz (Troll's Dance)"	Vander	3:40
4.	"Soleil d'Ork (Ork's Sun)"	Jannick Top	3:50
5.	"Zombies (Ghost Dance)"	Vander	4:20

Side two
No.	Title	Writer(s)	Length
6.	"De Futura"	Top	17:40

Bonus track on Seventh CD
No.	Title	Writer(s)	Length
7.	"Ëmëhntëhtt-Ré (extrait no. 2)"	Vander	3:12

== Legacy ==
Professional ratings
Review scores
Source	Rating
Allmusic	3.5/5 stars

Bassist Jannick Top re-recorded his compositions "Soleil d'Ork" and "De Futura" for his 2001 debut solo album, Soleil d'Ork.

Industrial hip-hop group Death Grips sampled "De Futura" in the song "Known for It", on their debut mixtape Exmilitary.

== Personnel ==
=== Musicians ===
Magma

- Christian Vander – percussion (1–3), vocals (1–3, 5, 7), keyboards (1, 3, 5), drums (2–7), synthesizer (3, 5), piano (7)
- Jannick "Janik" Top – bass (1, 3–7), horn arrangement (1), fret-cello (3, 5, 6), vocals (4, 6), percussion (4), synthesizer (4), O.R.S. bass synthesizer (6), keyboards (6)
- Klaus Blasquiz – vocals (1, 2, 6, 7), growl (5)
- Stella Vander – vocals (1, 7)
- Michel Graillier – piano (1)
- Patrick Gauthier – piano (2) synthesizer (2, 7)
- Bernard Paganotti – bass (2), percussion (2), vocals (2)

Additional Musicians

- Lisa Deluxe – vocals (1)
- Lucille Cullaz – vocals (1)
- Catherine Szpira – vocals (1)
- Alain Hatot – saxophones (1), flutes (4)
- Pierre Dutour – trumpets (1)

=== Technical ===
- Giorgio Gomelsky – producer
- Jean Peal Malek – engineer, mixer
- Alain Français – engineer
- Gilles Grenier – mixer
- Klaus Blasquiz – cover art (after original issue)

== Literature ==
- Gonin, Philippe (2010), "Üdü Wüdü", Magma - Décryptage d'un mythe et d'une musique (in French), Marseille: Le Mot et le Reste, pp. 189–198, ISBN 978-2-36054-000-6
