= Šlaǧ Tanƶ =

Studio album by Magma
- Released: 10 January 2015
- Recorded: September 2013 – September 2014
- Studios: Studio ÜZ, France
- Genre: Zeuhl
- Length: 20:51
- Label: Seventh Records
- Producer: Christian Vander

Magma chronology
Rïah Sahïltaahk (2014)	Šlaǧ Tanƶ (2015)	Zëss (2019)

Šlaǧ Tanƶ is the thirteenth studio album by French rock band Magma, released on 10 January 2015.

== Background ==
Like Félicité Thösz, Šlaǧ Tanƶ was performed by the band starting in 2009. It is implied it was also written in 2009. It contains a noticeable amount of lyrics in French, which is not common for the band's discography.

Seuls les clochers des Mondes
Ont tinté, ont tinté, ont tinté
Ont tinté, les clochers des Mondes
Ont tinté les clochers...
Les clochers des Mondes
Ont tinté... Seuls
Seuls...en...ma...Nuit...

— Imëhntösz - Alerte !

== Track listing ==
All tracks are written by Christian Vander

No.	Title	Length
1.	"Imëhntösz - Alert!"	2:19
2.	"Šlaǧ"	3:02
3.	"Dümb"	2:57
4.	"Vers la nuit"	3:29
5.	"Dümblaê (Le Silence des mondes)"	2:57
6.	"Zü Zaïn !"	2:16
7.	"Šlaǧ Tanƶ"	2:29
8.	"Wohldünt"	1:22
Total length:		20:51

== Personnel ==
- Christian Vander – drums, vocals (8), percussion, piano
- Stella Vander – vocals
- Isabelle Feuillebois – vocals
- Hervé Aknin – vocals
- Benoit Alziary – vibraphone
- James Mac Gaw – guitar
- Jérémie Ternoy – piano, Fender Rhodes
- Philippe Bussonnet – bass guitar
