= Theatre Du Taur Concert, 1975 =

Live album by Magma
- Released: 1994
- Recorded: 1975, Toulouse
- Length: 93:52
- Label: Akt

Magma chronology
Les Voix De Magma (1989)	Theatre Du Taur Concert, 1975 (1994)	Akt V (Concert Bobino, 1981 (1995)

Professional ratings
Review scores
Source	Rating
Babyblaue Prog-Reviews	12/15 stars

Theatre Du Taur Concert, 1975 (also known as Akt IV) is an official bootleg live album by the French rock band Magma. It was recorded in Toulouse on 24 September 1975 but it was not released until 1994.

The live version of "Mekanïk Destruktïw Kommandöh" recorded here is very distinct from the studio releases, as it features prominent instrumental contributions and improvisations by Didier Lockwood on violin and Bernard Paganotti on bass.

== Track listing ==
1. "Köhntarkösz" - 32:29
2. "Hhaï" - 11:19
3. "Kobaïa" - 11:48
4. "Mëkanïk Dëstruktïẁ Kömmandöh" - 38:16

== Line-up ==
- Klaus Blasquiz - vocals & percussion
- Stella Vander - vocals
- Didier Lockwood - violin
- Gabriel Federow - guitar
- Benoit Widemann - keyboards
- Patrick Gauthier - keyboards
- Bernard Paganotti - bass
- Christian Vander - drums
