= Köhntarkösz =

Studio album by Magma
- Released: 10 September 1974
- Recorded: 1-12 May 1974
- Venues: The Manor Mobile, Bastide De Pierrefeu (Valbonne)
- Genre: Zeuhl
- Length: 41:16
- Labels: Vertigo, A&M, Seventh Day
- Producer: Giorgio Gomelsky

Magma chronology
Ẁurdah Ïtah (1974)	Köhntarkösz (1974)	Live/Hhaï (1975)

Singles from Köhntarkösz
- 1. "Mekanik Machine" / "Köhntarkösz" Released: 1974

Professional ratings
Review scores
Source	Rating
AllMusic	4/5 stars

Köhntarkösz is the fifth studio album by French band Magma, released on 10 September 1974.

== Background ==
Köhntarkösz was recorded from May 1-12, 1974, soon after the sudden Ẁurdah Ïtah sessions the previous month. "Ork Alarm" constitutes a very early version of "De Futura", later released on Üdü Ẁüdü, which would become Jannick Top's signature piece. "Coltrane Sündia" (Note: Kobaïan translation: "Coltrane, Rest in Peace") is an elegy for John Coltrane.

The title piece of the album forms a section of the Köhntarkösz cycle. Although first in order of release, it has now been formulated as the second part in a trilogy consisting of K.A. (Köhntarkösz Anteria), Köhntarkösz, and Ëmëhntëhtt-Rê.

== Plot ==
In search of magical immortality, a man named Köhntarkösz discovers the tomb of Ëmëhntëhtt-Ré, a great pharaoh of Ancient Egypt. (Note: Depicted in K.A (Köhntarkösz Anteria) (2004)) Descending into the tomb, he hears a song of the angels intended for the deceased; panicking, he rushes further and further down. As he finds the resting place of Ëmëhntëhtt-Ré and pushes his tombstone, dust penetrates every pore of his skin, and he begins to receive a vision of Ëmëhntëhtt-Ré's entire life. (Note: Depicted in Ëmëhntëhtt-Ré (2009))

== Track listing ==
All tracks are written by Christian Vander, except "Ork Alarm" by Jannick Top.

Side one
No.	Title	Length
1.	"Köhntarkösz, Part I (Note: On digital releases, both parts of Köhntarkösz are placed together on the track listing.)"	15:22
2.	"Ork Alarm"	5:28

Side two
No.	Title	Length
1.	"Köhntarkösz, Part II"	15:55
2.	"Coltrane Sündïa"	4:11

== Personnel ==
Musicians

- Klaus Blasquiz – vocals, percussion
- Stella Vander – vocals
- Gerard Bikialo – pianos, Yamaha organ
- Michel Graillier – pianos, clavinet
- Brian Godding – guitar
- Jannick "Janik" Top – bass, cello, vocals, piano
- Christian Vander – drums, vocals, piano, percussion

Other

- "Loulou" Sarkissian "Mekanik" – stage manager
- Fabio Nicoli – design & art direction
- Giorgio Gomelsky – producer
- Malcolm Robertson – photography
- Simon Heyworth – engineer

== Literature ==
- Gonin, Philippe (2010), "Köhntarkösz", Magma – Décryptage d'un mythe et d'une musique (in French), Marseille: Le Mot et le Reste, pp. 171–178, ISBN 978-2-36054-000-6
