= Félicité Thösz =

Studio album by Magma
- Released: 3 July 2012
- Recorded: September 2011 – April 2012
- Studio: Studio ÜZ, France
- Genre: Zeuhl
- Length: 32:30
- Label: Seventh Records
- Producer: Christian Vander

Magma chronology
Ëmëhntëhtt-Ré (2009)	Félicité Thösz (2012)	Zühn Ẁöhl Ünsaï - Live 1974 (2014)

Professional ratings
Review scores
Source	Rating
Prog	3.5/5 stars

Félicité Thösz is the eleventh studio album by French band Magma, released on 3 July 2012.

== Background ==
The album was Magma's first studio release in 27 years to contain new material written after the band's reformation in 1996.

"Félicité Thösz" was written during 2001-02 by Christian Vander, but only played live by the band from 2009. "Les hommes sont venus" was written and performed in 1992 by Les Voix De Magma, and again in 1995 for the band's 25th anniversary, then called "Tous Ensemble".

Félicité Thösz is sung almost entirely in Magma's constructed language Kobaïan, apart from a passage in French named "Seule une fleur est venue au fond des bois en mon cœur (âme)".

== Track listing ==
All tracks are written by Christian Vander

No.	Title	Length
1.	"Félicité Thösz": a. "Ëkmah"; b. "Ëlss"; c. "Dzoï"; d. "Nüms"; e. "Tëha"; f. "Ẁaahrz"; g. "Dühl"; h. "Tsaï"; i. "Öhst"; j. "Zahrr"	28:12 2:39 1:15 2:24 1:52 5:15 4:04 1:19 3:42 4:53 0:49
2.	"Les hommes sont venus"	4:18
Total length:		32:30

== Personnel ==
- Christian Vander – drums, vocals, percussion, glockenspiel (11), clavier (11)
- Stella Vander – vocals, percussion, chant (11)
- Isabelle Feuillebois – vocals, chant (11)
- Hervé Aknin – vocals, chant (11)
- Benoit Alziary – vibraphone
- James Mac Gaw – guitar
- Bruno Ruder – piano
- Philippe Bussonnet – bass guitar
- Sandrine Destefanis – chant (11)
- Sylvie Fisichella – chant (11)
- Marcus Linon – chant (11)
