= Ëmëhntëhtt-Ré =

Studio album by Magma
- Released: 20 October 2009
- Recorded: January 2007 – September 2009
- Genres: Zeuhl; jazz-rock
- Length: 51:06
- Label: Seventh Records
- Producer: Christian Vander

Magma chronology
| K.A (Köhntarkösz Anteria) (2004) | Ëmëhntëhtt-Ré (2009) | Félicité Thösz (2012) |

Professional ratings
Review scores
| Source | Rating |
|---|---|
| AllMusic | 3.5/5 stars |

Ëmëhntëhtt-Ré is the tenth studio album by French progressive rock band Magma. It was released on 20 October 2009. Parts of it have been played live since 1975 and can be found on various albums as extracts or live versions.

Included with the CD is a making-of DVD called "Phases".

== Background ==
Like the band's previous release, K.A (Köhntarkösz Anteria), Ëmëhntëhtt-Ré is formed of material Magma wrote and performed live during the mid 1970s to 1980. Unlike Köhntarkösz Anteria however, where the album consisted entirely of unreleased material, Ëmëhntëhtt-Ré is formed of both unreleased and released material from that era, with most of the album serving as a large-scale rerecording.

- The song "Ëmëhntëhtt-Ré I" combines "Ëmëhntëht-Rê (Announcement)" from the album Live/Hhaï (1975) and "Rindë (Eastern Song)" from the album Attahk (1978).
- The song "Ëmëhntëhtt-Ré II" combines "Ëmëhntëht-Rê (Extrait n' deux)" (released on the 1988 CD of Üdü Ẁüdü), "Hhaï" from the album Live/Hhaï (1975), and "Zombies (Ghost Dance)" from Üdü Ẁüdü.

The repurposing of material from other albums is because the album was always meant to consist of these songs, and they were split over numerous different albums at the time when it was clear it would not be released in its intended format.

The album belongs to a trilogy of three comprising K.A (Köhntarkösz Anteria), Köhntarkösz, and Ëmëhntëhtt-Ré, called the Köhntarkösz Trilogy. The album's content tells the story of Ëmëhntëhtt-Ré, murdered in antiquity. The figure from the previous two albums, Köhntarkösz, finds his tomb and has a grand, vivid vision of Ëmëhntëhtt-Ré's life, who eventually takes over his body and becomes anew, fulfilling the prophecy and ending the trilogy's story.

Ëmëhntëhtt-Ré is sung almost entirely in Magma's constructed language Kobaïan, apart from some words in English ("To believe in God", "He's got a love supreme" and "No more then...").

The actual name of Ëmëhntëhtt-Ré cannot be typed in an actual keyboard, since the "é" character is a romanization of a custom kobaïan character, which is not seen in any other kobaïan word. The same character has also been romanized with "ê". An uppercase romanization of the same character exists, which implies the existence of an uppercase version of it, though there is not known sight of.

== Track listing ==
| No. | Title | Length |
|---|---|---|
| 1. | "Ëmëhntëhtt-Ré I: a. "Ëmëhntëht-Rê (Announcement)" - 3:39; b. "Rind-ë" - 3:15" | 6:53 |
| 2. | "Ëmëhntëhtt-Ré II: a. "Ëmëhntëht-Rê (Extrait n' deux)" - 2:48; b. "Hhaï" - 11:48; c. "Zombies" - 8:48" | 22:25 |
| 3. | "Ëmëhntëhtt-Ré III" | 13:06 |
| 4. | "Ëmëhntëhtt-Ré IV" | 3:54 |
| 5. | "Funëhrarïum Kanht" | 4:19 |
| 6. | "Sêhë" | 0:27 |
| Total length: | | 51:06 |

== Personnel ==
Magma

- Christian Vander – drums, vocals, piano, Fender Rhodes, keyboard, percussion
- Stella Vander – vocals, percussion
- Isabelle Feuillebois – vocals
- Hervé Aknin – vocals
- Benoît Alziary – vibraphone
- James MacGaw – guitar
- Bruno Ruder – Fender Rhodes
- Philippe Bussonnet – bass, piccolo bass

With:

- Claude Lamamy – vocals
- Marcus Linon – vocals
- Pierre-Michel Sivadier – vocals
- Himiko Paganotti – vocals
- Antoine Paganotti – vocals
- Emmanuel Borghi – piano

== Literature ==
- Gonin, Philippe (2010), "Ëmëhntëhtt-Rê", Magma - Décryptage d'un mythe et d'une musique (in French), Marseille: Le Mot et le Reste, pp. 269–282, ISBN 978-2-36054-000-6
