= Kartëhl =

Studio album by Magma
- Released: 30 September 2022
- Recorded: 7 March – 12 June 2022
- Studio: UZ Studio
- Genres: Zeuhl; soul-jazz; progressive rock
- Length: 53:16
- Label: Seventh Records
- Producer: Stella Vander

Magma chronology
Eskähl 2020 - Bordeaux, Toulouse, Perpignan (2021)	Kartëhl (2022)

Kartëhl or Kãrtëhl is the fifteenth studio album by French progressive rock and zeuhl group Magma, released on 30 September 2022 by Seventh Records as a compact disc and three-sided double LP. The album is a collaborative work between the band members, with royalties from the track Dëhndë to benefit the French charity La Fondation Initiative Autisme for people with autism.

The album was recorded by Francis Linon at the band's own UZ Studio between 7 March and 12 June 2022, and mastered by Marcus Linon at Greasy Records Studio in Paris.

== Background ==
After the previous album, Zëss, the subject of which is of a universe-ending apocalypse, the band members wanted to produce a brighter and more optimistic album with Kartëhl. Kartëhl is notable for being the first album since 1976's Üdü Ẁüdü to have songs not written by Vander fill up half of the album's tracklist. For the title Hakëhn Deïs, Magma has released a music video clip for the first time in its more than 50-year band history. In the video, two dancers from the Paris Opera, alienated by artificial intelligence, dance in an expressionist style to the music.

== Tracklist ==
No.	Title	Writer(s)	Instrumentation	Length
1.	"Hakëhn Deïs"	Christian Vander		7:12
2.	"Do Rïn Ïlï Üss"	Hervé Aknin		4:38
3.	"Irena Balladina"	Christian Vander		5:11
4.	"Ẁalomëhndᴧëm Ẁarreï"	Thierry Eliez		7:36
5.	"Ẁiï Mëlëhn Tü"	Simon Goubert		8:54
6.	"Dëhndë"	Christian Vander		6:55
7.	"Hakëhn Deïs" (Bonus title, recording of 1978)	Christian Vander	Christian Vander: piano, vocals; René Garber: vocals	6:11
8.	"Dëhndë" (Bonus title, recording of 1978)	Christian Vander	René Garber: piano, vocals	6:38
Total length:				53:16

== Personnel ==
- Christian Vander - drums, vocals, tambourin
- Stella Vander - vocals, backing vocals, chime
- Hervé Aknin - vocals, backing vocals
- Isabelle Feuillebois - vocals
- Sylvie Fisichella - vocals
- Caroline Indjein- vocals
- Laura Guarrato - vocals
- Rudy Blas - guitar
- Thierry Eliez - piano, Fender Rhodes, keyboards
- Simon Goubert - piano, Fender Rhodes, keyboards
- Jimmy Top - bass
- René Garber - vocals, piano
