= Zëss =

Zëss: Le Jour du Néant

Studio album by Magma
- Released: 14 June 2019
- Genre: Zeuhl; third stream; spiritual jazz
- Length: 37:57
- Language: Kobaïan, French
- Label: Seventh Records
- Producer: Stella Vander

Magma chronology
Šlaǧ Tanƶ (2015)	Zëss: Le Jour du Néant (2019)	Kartëhl (2022)

Zëss (also known as Zëss: Le Jour du Néant) is the fourteenth studio album by the French rock band Magma, which was released on 14 June 2019 on Christian Vander's Seventh Records.

The composition dates back to the 1970s and has been performed live on several occasions (including Bobino Concert 1981, Les Voix Concert 1992, and Mythes Et Legendes Volume IV 2008) but not recorded in studio until 2018.

The work was performed live in the Grande Salle Pierre Boulez of Philharmonie de Paris on 26 June 2019, celebrating 50 years of Magma.

== Track listing ==
All tracks are written by Christian Vander.

No.	Title	Length
1.	"Ẁöhm Dëhm Zeuhl Stadium (Hymne au Néant)"	4:57
2.	"Da Zeuhl Ẁortz Dëhm Ẁrëhntt (Les Forces de l'Univers/Les Eléments)"	6:22
3.	"Dï Ẁöóhr Sprašer (La Voix qui Parle)"	5:12
4.	"Štreüm Ündëts Ẁëhëm (Pont de l'En-Delá)"	6:04
5.	"Zëss Mahntëhr Kantöhm (Le Maître Chant)"	8:08
6.	"Zï Ïss Ẁöss Štëhëm (Vers l'Infiniment)"	3:15
7.	"Dümgëhl Blaö (Glas Ultime)"	3:58
Total length:		37:57

== Personnel ==
- Christian Vander - lead vocals
- Stella Vander - lead vocals
- Hervé Aknin - vocals
- Isabelle Feuillebois - vocals
- Julie Vander - vocals
- Laura Guarrato - vocals
- Marcus Linon - vocals
- Sandrine Destafanis - vocals
- Rudy Blas - guitar
- Philippe Bussonnet - bass
- Morgan Ågren - drums
- Simon Goubert - piano
- Sylvie Fisichella - vocals
- Remi Dumoulin - orchestration
- City of Prague Philharmonic Orchestra - orchestra
- Adam Klemens - conductor
- Lucie Svehlova - concertmaster
