= Rïah Sahïltaahk =

Studio album by Magma
- Released: 15 September 2014
- Recorded: September 2013 – June 2014
- Studio: Studio ÜZ, France
- Genre: Zeuhl; jazz-rock
- Length: 24:27
- Label: Seventh
- Producer: Christian Vander

Magma chronology
Zühn Ẁöhl Ünsaï - Live 1974 (2014)	Rïah Sahïltaahk (2014)	Šlaǧ Tanƶ (2015)

Rïah Sahïltaahk is the twelfth studio album by French band Magma, released on 15 September 2014.

== Background ==
RÏAH SAHÏLTAAHK is the name of the Kobaïan who left after all the others, despite their disapproval. He thought he was better than anyone else and he was sure he could convert Kobaïa’s enemies to the Kobaïan spirit. But he failed and left alone for Kobaïa. On the symbolic stop-over planet, Malaria, he has to face the raging elements he thinks he can dominate. With his ship almost sunk, he ends up begging them… to no avail. He will disappear. Drowned, swept away by the frenzied elements. After the noise… silence. At dawn, only a finally calmed remains, enlightened by the soft beams of the sun in this new day.

— Magma

The song "Rïah Sahïltaahk" was featured on the band's second studio album 1001° Centigrades in their early period of activity, taking up the entire side one of the LP. The band's leader, Christian Vander, was not satisfied with the final recording present on the album, but relented as other band members found it satisfactory.

For the 45th anniversary of Magma, Vander chose to pursue an alternative take of the song, with new instrumental passages which were not present on the original recording, along with forgoing brass instrumentation in favor of vocal parts.

== Track listing ==
All tracks are written by Christian Vander

No.	Title	Length
1.	"Watseï Kobaïa"	4:41
2.	"Di Mahntër Sahïltaahk"	3:00
3.	"Süri Sï Toïdo"	3:31
4.	"Ün Zoïn Glaö"	3:11
5.	"Ïss Walomëhn Dëm"	2:25
6.	"Bradïa Ëtnah"	2:24
7.	"Mem Loïlë"	3:46
8.	"Wöleï"	1:29
Total length:		24:27

== Personnel ==
- Christian Vander – drums, vocals, percussion, piano
- Stella Vander – vocals
- Isabelle Feuillebois – vocals
- Hervé Aknin – vocals
- Benoit Alziary – vibraphone
- James Mac Gaw – guitar
- Jérémie Ternoy – piano
- Philippe Bussonnet – bass guitar
