= Inédits =

Live album by Magma
- Released: 1977
- Length: 41:23
- Label: Tapioca, Les Tontons M'Ecoutent (LTM), Seventh Records

Magma chronology
Üdü Ẁüdü (1976)	Inédits (1977)	Attahk (1978)

Inédits is a live outtakes album by French rock band Magma. It was released in 1977 and features several unreleased pieces that were played in concerts from 1972-1975. The pieces "Om Zanka", "Gamma", and "Gamma Anteria", in that order, would eventually be used for the third track of the band's 2004 studio album K.A. (Kohntarkosz Anteria). The album was first released on Tapioca, then on LTM, and more recently on Seventh. It is noted for its poor sound quality.

== Track listing ==
No.	Title	Writer(s)	Recording date/location	Length
1.	"Soẁiloï + KMX - EXII - opus 3"	Christian Vander + Jannick Top	Early 1974	13:45
2.	"KMX - BXII - Opus 7"	Top	26 September 1974, Gibus Club, Paris	6:13
3.	"Om Zanka"	Vander	21 January 1975, Répétition Drancy	5:30
4.	"Gamma"	Vander	June 1973, Orry-la-Vile	4:00
5.	"Terrien si je t'ai Convoqué"	Vander	June 1972	4:10
6.	"Gamma Antéria"	Vander	15 February 1973, Studio Aquarium, Paris	7:45
Total length:				41:23

== Personnel ==
- Klaus Blasquiz – vocals, percussion (1, 2, 3, 5, 6)
- René Garber – contrabass clarinet (5), vocals (6)
- Louis Toesca – trumpet (5)
- Teddy Lasry – saxes (5)
- Jeff Seffer – saxes (5)
- Didier Lockwood – violin (3)
- Gabriel Federow – guitar (3)
- Claude Olmos – guitar (1, 4)
- Marc Fosset – guitar (6)
- Jean-Luc Manderlier – keyboards (5, 6)
- Michel Grailler – keyboards (1, 2, 4)
- Benoît Widemann – keyboards (3)
- Jean-Pol Asseline – keyboards (3)
- Francois Cahen – keyboards (5)
- Gerard Bikialo – keyboards (1, 2, 4, 6)
- Francis Moze – bass (5)
- Jean-Pierre Lembert – bass (6)
- Jannick "Janik" Top – bass (1, 2, 4)
- Bernard Paganotti – bass (3)
- Christian Vander – drums
