= K.A (Köhntarkösz Anteria) =

Studio album by Magma
- Released: 8 November 2004
- Recorded: February 2003 – October 2004
- Studio: Studio UZ
- Genres: Zeuhl; jazz-rock
- Length: 48:48
- Label: Seventh

Magma chronology
| Merci (1984) | K.A (Köhntarkösz Anteria) (2004) | Ëmëhntëhtt-Ré (2009) |

Professional ratings
Review scores
| Source | Rating |
|---|---|
| AllMusic | 4/5 stars |
| Pitchfork Media | 8.4/10 |

K.A (Köhntarkösz Anteria) is the ninth studio album by French rock band Magma, released on 8 November 2004. The album was Magma's first full-length studio release in 20 years. Some of the material was composed by drummer Christian Vander from 1973 to 1975, and fragments of it can be heard on Magma's 1977 live album Inédits.

K.A is sung almost entirely in Magma's constructed language Kobaïan, apart from a short passage in French ("Les Musiciens du Bord du Monde").

== Track listing ==
All tracks are written by Christian Vander.

| No. | Title | Length |
|---|---|---|
| 1. | "K.A I" | 11:12 |
| 2. | "K.A II" | 15:53 |
| 3. | "K.A III" | 21:43 |
| Total length: | | 48:48 |

== Legacy ==
This album is part of the Köhntarkösz cycle of albums. It is the prequel to Köhntarkösz (1974). The sequel and final installment in the trilogy is Ëmëhntëhtt-Rê, released in November 2009.

The Köhntarkösz trilogy describes the spiritual quest of two men to understand the intimate workings of the forces of the universe and achieve immortality. The quest was begun by Ëmëhntëhtt-Rê, an ancient Egyptian pharaoh who devoted his life to spiritual efforts, but who was murdered shortly before he could reach the final attainment.

Köhntarkösz tells the story of a modern archaeologist who discovers the location of Ëmëhntëhtt-Rê's tomb. He enters, and as he crosses slowly along the dark passages to the burial chamber, he hears a celestial voice and has visions of Ëmëhntëhtt-Rê's life. When he reaches the burial chamber and touches the tomb, the ancient dust seeps into his pores, and he has a momentary and devastating flash of understanding of the complete attainment of the ancient pharaoh. Waking, his flash of understanding lost in his normative consciousness, he then devotes his own life to recovering the achievements of Ëmëhntëhtt-Rê and carrying them to the final stage (his efforts and teachings, incidentally, may be the link to the remainder of Magma's mythology, the forming of a group of spiritualists who ultimately flee the decrepit Earth for a higher life on the planet Kobaïa).

The story of Köhntarkösz Anteria isn't told literally. Using the unofficial Kobaïan-French dictionary, Timothy Hannem wrote his own vision on the story of the album: "Köhntarkösz Anteria, an intermediate work between these narratives, begins with the celestial appraisal of the archaeologist figure. The voices announce that he will be a future prophet (Köhntarkösz) but at the moment is 'sleeping', i.e. unaware of his future path and place in the spiritual history of the human race. The final section, a merging of two pieces originally known as 'Om Zanka' and 'Gamma Anteria', deals with a youthful vision of the future Köhntarkösz, in which he journeys to a strange village where he is greeted with joyous cries of 'halleluja!' and taken to the entrance of Ëmëhntëhtt-Rê's tomb, at which a mysterious male voice bids him welcome and entreats him to enter. At this point, the album Köhntarkösz begins…"

== Personnel ==
- Stella Vander – vocals, percussion
- Antoine Paganotti – vocals
- Himiko Paganotti – vocals
- Isabelle Feuillebois – vocals
- James Mac Gaw – guitars
- Emmanuel Borghi – piano, Fender Rhodes
- Frédéric d'Oelsnitz – Fender Rhodes
- Philippe Bussonnet – bass guitar
- Christian Vander – drums, vocals, percussion

== Literature ==
- Gonin, Philippe (2010), "K.A", Magma - Décryptage d'un mythe et d'une musique (in French), Marseille: Le Mot et le Reste, pp. 257–264, ISBN 978-2-36054-000-6
