= Live/Hhaï =

Live album by Magma
- Released: 12 December 1975
- Recorded: 1–5 June 1975, Paris
- Venue: Taverne de l'Olympia
- Genres: Zeuhl; jazz-rock
- Length: 86:11
- Label: Utopia
- Producer: Giorgio Gomelsky

Magma chronology
Köhntarkösz (1974)	Live/Hhaï (1975)	Üdü Wüdü (1976)

Professional ratings
Review scores
Source	Rating
Allmusic	4.5/5 stars

Live/Hhaï (also known as Magma Live, Live Köhntark, and Hhaï Live) is the first live album by French group Magma. It was recorded in Paris from 1–5 June 1975 at the Taverne de l'Olympia.

== Background ==
After the recording of both Ẁurdah Ïtah and Köhntarkösz in early 1974, Magma embarked on a series of disastrous and poorly organized tours, which led band leader Christian Vander to experience acute paranoia and a mental breakdown, causing a mass resignation of all members of the band bar Klaus Blasquiz. The band would slowly reassemble itself towards 1975, recruiting guitarist Gabriel Federow, Vander's old friend Bernard Paganotti, and eighteen-year-old violinist Didier Lockwood. Magma would resume concerts after four months of rehearsals on February 9, 1975 to critical acclaim in the press. With new-found confidence, they decided to record a double album's worth of live material for their five concerts at the Taverne de l'Olympia, in 1–5 June.

The track titles were slightly altered due to copyright restrictions on the preceding albums. The first two tracks are the title track from Köhntarkösz (1974). "Ëmëhntëht-Rê (Announcement)" and "Hhaï" were eventually incorporated into the complete composition Ëmëhntëhtt-Ré. "Kobah" is a rearranged version of "Kobaïa" from their 1970 debut album. "Lïhns", a previously unreleased track, has yet to be recorded in the studio, but was performed live at the Triton club for their 35th anniversary DVD release, Mythes et Légendes, Volume III, which was released in 2007. The last two tracks make up the second half of Mekanïk Destruktïw Kommandöh, with "Mëkanïk Zaïn" substituting for "Nebëhr Gudahtt" and "Mekanïk Kommandöh".

The album has been re-released many times: in 1975 on Utopia Records, in 1978 on Tomato Records, 1989 and 2009 on Seventh (the band's own label), 2001 on Victor, and 1996 and 2001 on Charly. The original album is available as a single cd and a remixed version with two bonus tracks is available as a two cd set.

== Track listing ==
All music written by Christian Vander.

=== Disc one ===
1. "Köhntark (Part One)" (15:45)
2. "Köhntark (Part Two)" (16:14)
3. "Ëmëhntëht-Rê (Announcement)" (8:10) (only on the 2CD version)

=== Disc two ===
1. "Hhaï" (9:20)
2. "Kobah" (6:36)
3. "Lïhns" (4:55)
4. "Da Zeuhl Wortz Mekanïk" (6:14) (only on the 2CD version)
5. "Mëkanïk Zaïn" (18:57)

=== LP track listing ===
==== A ====
1. "Köhntark (Part 1)" (15:44)

==== B ====
1. "Köhntark (Part 2)" (16:16)

==== C ====
1. "Kobah" (6:23)
2. "Lïhns" (5:51)
3. "Hhaï" (8:41)

==== D ====
1. "Mëkanïk Zaïn" (19:17)

== Personnel ==
=== Musicians ===
- Klaus Blasquiz – vocals
- Stella Vander – vocals
- Didier Lockwood – violin
- Gabriel Federow – guitar
- Benoit Widemann – keyboards
- Jean-Pol Asseline – keyboards
- Bernard Paganotti – bass
- Christian Vander – drums, vocals

=== Production ===
- Christian Vander – inside design
- Frank Owens – engineer
- Georges Besner – inside design
- Giorgio Gomelski – production
- Klaus Blasquiz – ideograms, cover design

== Literature ==
- Gonin, Philippe (2010), "Magma Live", Magma - Décryptage d'un mythe et d'une musique (in French), Marseille: Le Mot et le Reste, pp. 179–188, ISBN 978-2-36054-000-6
