= Merci (Magma album) =

Studio album by Magma
- Released: November 1984 (Note: The first Jaro pressings are provisional; this version swaps the track listing by vinyl side (the last track is "Otis") and is unmixed. The finished release was mixed September 1984-February 1985, releasing 4 May 1985. All future releases of the album list copyright as 1985.)
- Recorded: June 1982 – October 1984
- Genres: Zeuhl; soul jazz; jazz-funk
- Length: 40:24
- Labels: Jaro; Label Du Bon Independant; Seventh Records
- Producer: Christian Vander

Magma chronology
Retrospektïẁ (1981)	Merci (1984)	K.A (Köhntarkösz Anteria) (2004)

Singles from Merci
- 1. "Ooh, Ooh, Baby" / "Otis" Released: 1985

Merci is the eighth studio album by French rock band Magma, released provisionally in November 1984 and again on 4 May 1985 with a finished mix.

The album largely departs from Magma's other releases, with a soul and jazz-funk influence. The lyrical language Kobaïan, created by the band's leader Christian Vander, was joined by English and French. Before this album's release, Magma had metamorphosed into Offering, which would release an additional three albums until the Magma name was revived for 2004's K.A (Köhntarkösz Anteria).

== Background ==
Merci is a major departure from Magma's previous works. It was a passion project by Christian Vander and recorded over a period of two years; he was so focused on arrangements for the album that he gave up his traditional drummer position to take full production duties. The album is essentially a solo album; Vander's name is listed on the front cover on initial pressings. The last two tracks are stripped-down instrumentally, and meant as a musical transition to Vander's next project Offering.

This is also the most recent Magma album to have lyrics in English, which comprise the majority of tracks "Ooh Ooh Baby", "Do the Music", and "I Must Return"; the only other Magma track to have English lyrics is "Kobaïa".

== Track listing ==
Side one
No.	Title	Writer(s)	Composer	Length
1.	"Call from the Dark (Ooh Ooh Baby)"	Christian Vander, Julie Dassin, Ricky Dassin	Vander	7:20
2.	"Do the Music"	Vander	Vander	4:25
3.	"Otis (Note: Split on early pressings as "Otis" (5:20) and "Otis (Ending)" (1:32) on tracks 2 and 4, with "Do the Music" in between.)"	Vander	Vander	7:15

Side two
No.	Title	Writer(s)	Composer	Length
4.	"I Must Return"	Vander, Julie Dassin, Ricky Dassin	Vander	6:32
5.	"Eliphas Levi"	René Garber	Garber	11:15
6.	"The Night We Died"	Vander	Vander	3:40

CD bonus track
No.	Title	Writer(s)	Composer	Length
7.	"You"	Georges Hali	Vander	3:55

== Personnel ==
- Christian Vander – lead vocals (2–3, 5–6), vocal synthesizers (1), synthesizers, Rhodes & acoustic piano, celeste, keyboards, production, arrangements
- Stella Vander – vocals
- Guy Khalifa – vocals, flute (5)
- Liza Deluxe – backing vocals (3–6)
- Benoit Widemann – synthesizer (1–4)
- François Laizeau – drums (1–4), drum programming (1–4)
- Klaus Blasquiz – lead vocal (4)
- Simon Goubert – synthesizer (1–2)
- Jean Pierre Fouquey – Rhodes piano (3)
- Phillipe Slominski – trumpet (1, 2, 4)
- Christian Martinez – trumpet (1, 4)
- Michel Goldberg – saxophone (1–2)
- Michel Gaucher – saxophone (3)
- Freddy Opsepian – trumpet (3)
- Christian Guizen – trombone (3)
- Alex Ferrand – vocals (2)
- Jean-Luc Chevalier – guitar (2)
- Patrick Gauthier – synthesizer (2)
- Paul Bayle – saxophone on (2)
- Denis LeLoup – trombone on (2, 4)
- Jerome Naulay – trombone on (4)
- Zaka – percussion on (4)
- Michel Graillier – Rhodes piano on (5)
- Steve Shehan – percussion (5)
- Marc Éliard – bass

== Literature ==
- Gonin, Philippe (2010), "Merci", Magma - Décryptage d'un mythe et d'une musique (in French), Marseille: Le Mot et le Reste, pp. 217–233, ISBN 978-2-36054-000-6
