= Zao (French band) =

Background information
- Origin: France
- Genres: Progressive rock, Zeuhl, jazz fusion
- Years active: 1971–1977, 1994
- Spinoff of: Magma

Zao was a progressive rock/zeuhl band that was founded by two ex-members of Magma: Yochk'o Seffer (saxophone, clarinet) and François Cahen (piano). They were active from 1971 to 1994 and released six studio albums.

In 1976, Magma violinist Didier Lockwood also joined the band and appeared on their albums Kawana and Live!.

== Members ==
- Mauricia Platon – vocals
- Yochk'o Seffer – saxophones, clarinets, vocals
- François "Faton" Cahen – piano, keyboards
- Didier Lockwood – violin (1976)
- Joël Dugrenot – bass
- Jean-My Truong – drums
- Gérard Prevost – electric bass
- Piere "Ty Boum" Guignon – percussion
- Michèle Margand – violin
- Marie-Françoise Viaud – violin
- Françoise Douchet – viola
- Claudine Lassere – cello

== Discography ==
- Z=7L (1973)
- Osiris (1975)
- Shekina (1975)
- Kawana (1976)
- Live! (1976)
- Typhareth (1977)
- Akhenaton (1994)
- In Tokyo (2007)
