= Candy (Chet Baker album) =

Studio album by Chet Baker
- Released: 1985
- Recorded: June 1985, Sweden
- Genre: hard bop
- Length: 41:16
- Label: Sonet Records
- Producer: Rune Öfwerman

Candy is a 1985 album by jazz trumpeter Chet Baker, released by Swedish company Sonet Records. It was recorded in a lounge at the Sonet studio at Lidingö.

== Track listing ==
=== Side A ===
1. "Love for Sale" (Cole Porter) – 9:50
2. "Nardis" (Miles Davis) – 5:16
3. "Candy" (Mack David, Alex Kramer, Joan Whitney) – 5:04

=== Side B ===
1. "Bye Bye Blackbird" (Mort Dixon, Ray Henderson) – 7:47
2. "Sad Walk" (Bob Zieff) – 4:47
3. "Tempus Fugit" (Bud Powell) – 4:20
4. "Red's Blues" (Red Mitchell) – 4:12

== Personnel ==
- Chet Baker – trumpet, vocals
- Michel Graillier – piano
- Jean-Louis Rassinfosse – double bass
