= Marc Fosset =

French jazz guitarist (1949–2020)

Marc Fosset (17 May 1949 – 31 October 2020) was a French jazz guitarist. In the 1980s and 1990s, he recorded and toured with Stephane Grappelli.

== Life and career ==
Marc Fosset was born in Paris. He learned to play guitar left-handed after seeing Yves Montand and Didi Duprat perform, and was also influenced by Django Reinhardt's style. With Michel De Villers, Fosset began accompanying jazz and blues musicians in the Trois Mailletz club in Paris. He joined the rock band Magma, played with René Urtreger and Claude Guilhot, and in 1976 he founded a trio with Franco Manzecchi and Patrice Galas. In 1977 he formed a duo with Patrice Caratini. In the 1980s and 1990s, he recorded and toured with Stephane Grappelli. Fosset often performed in a duo with Jean-Michel Cazorla and as a trio with Laurent and Philippe Briand.

Fosset retired in 2010, because of Parkinson's disease. He died on 31 October 2020, aged 71.

== Discography ==
- 1978 Le Chauve Et Le Gaucher with Patrice Caratini (Open)
- 1978 Organ with Patrice Galas, Franco Manzecchi (Open)
- 1979 Boite a Musique with Patrice Caratini (Open)
- 1979 Petit Voyage with Patrice Caratini, Claude Guilhot, Charles Saudrais (Open)
- 1980 La Récré (America)
- 1980 Live with Patrice Galas, Umberto Pagnini (String)
- 1981 Hershey Bar with Michel de Villers (Ahead)
- 1982 3 Temps Pour Bien Faire with Patrice Caratini, Marcel Azzola
- 1982 Troisième Acte with Patrice Caratini
- 1986 Fleur De Banlieue (Vol. 2) Patrice Caratini, Marcel Azzola
- 1997 First Set (Izamusic)
- 2011 Au Jazzland (Altrisuoni)

=== As sideman ===
With Stéphane Grappelli

- 1973 Just One of Those Things
- 1983 Stephanova
- 1984 Bringing It Together with Toots Thielemans
- 1984 Looking at You with Stephane Grappelli
- 1985 For All Seasons with Yehudi Menuhin)
- 1987 Grappelli Plays Jerome Kern
- 1988 Menuhin & Grappelli Play "Jealousy" and Other Great Standards with Yehudi Menuhin
- 1988 Menuhin & Grappelli Play Berlin Kern Porter & Rodgers & Hart with Yehudi Menuhin
- 1988 Olympia 88
- 1989 Anything Goes with Yo-Yo Ma
- 1991 Stephane Grappelli in Tokyo
- 1992 Live 1992
- 1996 Stephane Grappelli & McCoy Tyner
- 1999 Live at the Cambridge Folk Festival

With others

- 1977 Inédits, Magma
- 1982/86 "Valse Blues" with Marcel Azzola et Patrice Caratini .
- 1988 Né Quelque Part, Maxime le Forestier
- 1993 Heroes, Mark O'Connor
- 2002 Jazzola, Marcel Azzola
- 2003 Tonino Baliardo, Tonino Baliardo
- 2007 Recidive No. 2, René Urtreger
- 2008 Florin Niculescu Plays Stephane Grappelli, Florin Niculescu
