= Les Voix De Magma =

Live album by Magma
- Released: 1992
- Recorded: 1992, Douarnenez
- Venue: Festival Jazz en Baie
- Length: 44:39
- Label: Akt

Magma chronology
Mekanïk Kommandöh (1989)	Les Voix De Magma (1992)	Akt IV (Théâtre Du Taur Concert, 1975 (1994)

Les Voix de Magma (also known as "Les Voix" Concert 1992 Douarnenez or Akt I) is a live album by French rock band Magma. The tracks were recorded live at the Festival Jazz en Baie in Douarnenez on 2 August 1992 and featuring vocal-heavy, largely acoustic reworkings of well-known pieces by Magma and Christian Vander's Offering. It was released in 1992 on Akt Records.

AllMusic described the album as "an attempt to resurrect his early material for a new generation of listeners."

== Track listing ==
1. "Ëmëhntëht-Rê" - 3:39 (C. Vander)
2. "C'est Pour Nous" - 7:56 (C. Vander)
3. "Zëss (Extrait)" - 17:18 (C. Vander)
4. "Ẁurdah Ïtah" - 15:46 (C. Vander)

== Personnel ==
- Christian Vander - vocals, piano, drums
- Stella Vander - vocals
- Addie Déat - vocals
- Julie Vander - vocals
- Bénédicte Ragu - vocals
- Isabelle Feuillebois - vocals
- Jean-Christophe Gamet - vocals
- Alex Ferrand - vocals
- Pierre-Michel Sivadier - keyboards
- Simon Goubert - piano, keyboards
- Philippe Dardelle - contrabass
- Francisco Juan Guerrero - engineer
