= Live 1992 (Stéphane Grappelli album) =

Live album by Stéphane Grappelli
- Released: 1992
- Genre: Jazz
- Label: Verve

Stéphane Grappelli chronology
Bach to the Beatles (1991)	Live 1992 (1992)	Michel Legrand (1992)

Live 1992 is a jazz album by Stéphane Grappelli. The album features Philip Catherine and Marc Fosset, guitars, and Niels-Henning Ørsted Pedersen, bass. It is one of his last live albums before his death in 1997. The album was recorded live on March 27 and 28, 1992 at the Salle de spectacles de Colombes, France and produced by Jean François Deiber for Birdology records. The original more serious looking photo of Grappelli on the red cover of the Birdology release was replaced with a lighter and younger looking picture of Grappelli in a coat for Verve.

== Reception ==
Professional ratings
Review scores
Source	Rating
AllMusic	4/5 stars
The Rolling Stone Jazz & Blues Album Guide	3/5 stars

The Washington Post reviewer concluded: "don't be surprised if you find yourself not only humming but asking that fundamental Gershwin question: 'Who could ask for anything more?'" The Penguin Guide to Jazz wrote that Grappelli "sounds like he enjoyed this one as much as any gig in the past, oh, forty years or so". AllMusic described it as "one of his more worthwhile recordings – in live performance or the studio – during the last decade of his beautiful life".

== Track listing ==
No.	Title	Length
1.	"Minor Swing"	5:54
2.	"Galerie des Princes"	6:09
3.	"Ballade"	5:25
4.	"Tears"	6:04
5.	"Blues for Django and Stéphane"	6:23
6.	"Stella By Starlight"	7:12
7.	"Sweet Chorus"	3:52
8.	"Oh, Lady, Be Good!"	6:59
9.	"Someone to Watch Over Me/I Got Rhythm"	5:09
Total length:		53:07
