= François Ovide =

French musician

François Ovide (born in Rouen, October 1952; died in Rouen, 29 May 2002) was a French guitarist, best known for his longstanding collaborations with Albert Marcoeur and with John Greaves.

Ovide grew up around Rouen. His first two band projects in the 1970s were rock band So & Co and Plat du Jour. In 1976, he started working with Marcoeur.

He went on to join Weidorje for the band's last year of existence and then started doing session work. He also joined folk rock band Gwendal in 1981. In 1984, he joined Greaves' backing band, working alongside Mireille Bauer (previously of Gong). They later married and had two children.

Ovide went on to play on Greaves' albums La Petite Bouteille de Linge (1991), Songs and The Caretaker. He also played on Pip Pyle's 1998 7 Year Itch. In the mid-1980s, he also recorded a solo album with Bauer, Pierre Vermeire, Andy Emler and others, but the project was never released.

Ovide also worked as a session musician with Renaud, Patricia Kaas, Johnny Hallyday and Maxime Le Forestier.

== Sources ==
- Calyx biography
