= Weidorje =

- Origin: France
- Genres: Zeuhl, Progressive rock, Jazz fusion
- Years active: 1976−1979
- Labels: Cobra
- Past members: Jean-Philippe Goude, François Ovide, Alain Guillard, Bernard Paganotti, Kirt Rust, Michel Ettori, Patrick Gauthier, Yvon Guillard

Weidorje was a French zeuhl progressive rock/fusion band, formed in 1976 around former Magma members, bassist Bernard Paganotti and keyboardist Patrick Gauthier. They released one self-titled LP album in 1978 (re-released on CD with two 1978 live bonus tracks in 1992 by the French Musea label) and dis-banded around 1979.

== Band members ==
=== Album personnel ===
- Michel Ettori − guitar (1976–78)
- Patrick Gauthier − keyboards
- Jean-Philippe Goude − keyboards
- Alain Guillard − saxophone
- Yvon Guillard − trumpet, vocals
- Bernard Paganotti − bass, vocals
- Kirt Rust − drums

=== Later members ===
- François Ovide − guitar (1979)
