= Magma (band) =

French progressive rock band

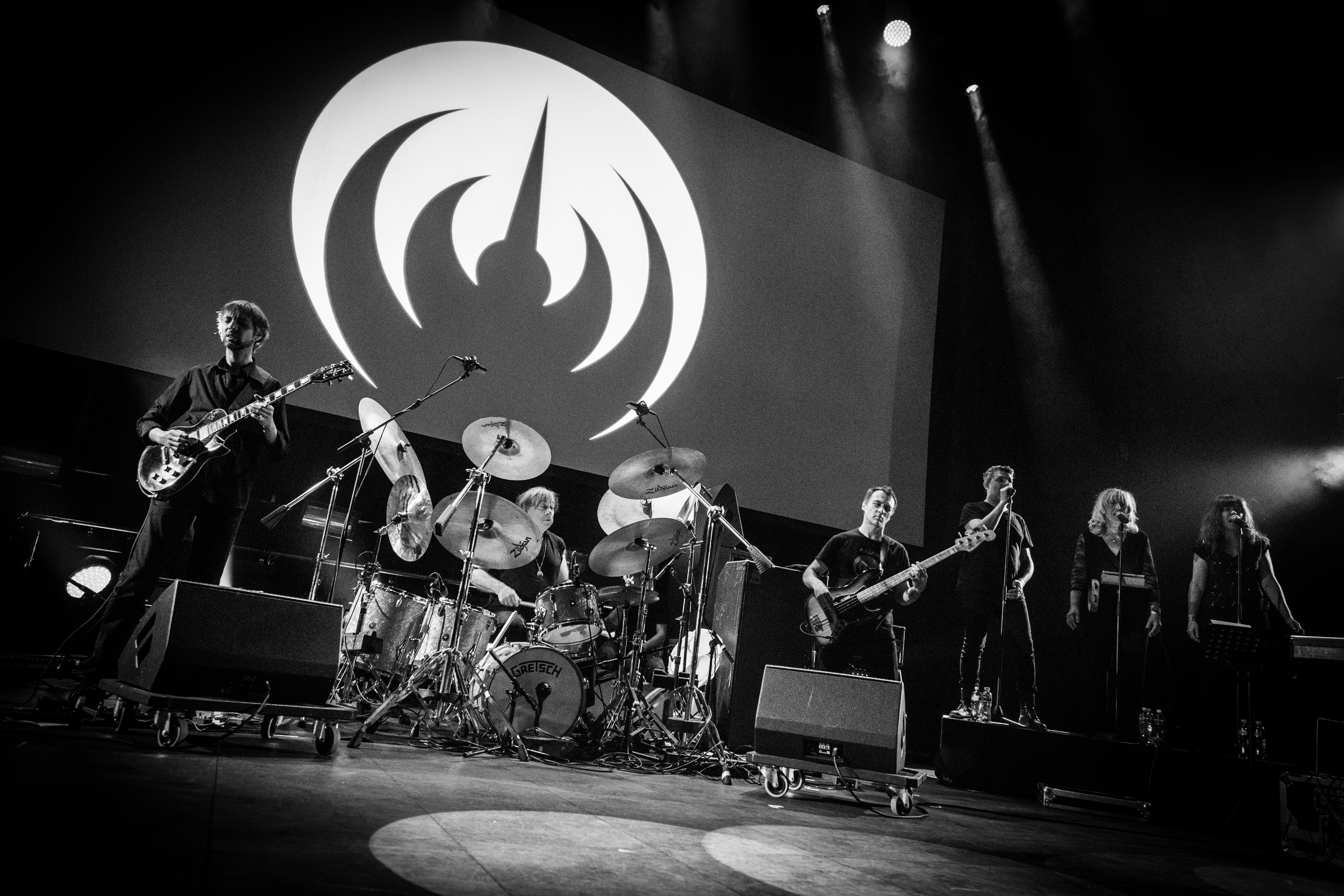
- Magma performing live at Roadburn Festival, 2017

Background information
- Origin: Paris, France
- Genres: Zeuhl; progressive rock
- Years active: 1969–1983; 1983-1996 (as Offering); 1996–present
- Labels: A&M; Musea Records; Philips; RCA; Seventh; Tomato; Utopia; Vertigo
- Members: Christian Vander; Stella Vander; Isabelle Feuillebois; Rudy Blas; Hervé Aknin; Francis Linon; Simon Goubert; Thierry Eliez; Charles Lucas; Caroline Indjein; Sylvie Fisichella; Laura Guarrato
- Past members: Francis Moze; Jannick "Janik" Top; Klaus Blasquiz; Didier Lockwood; Bernard Paganotti; Benoît Widemann; Teddy Lasry; Himiko Paganotti; Antoine Paganotti; Emmanuel Borghi; Bruno Ruder; Laurent Thibault; Jérémie Ternoy; Jim Grandcamp; James MacGaw; Jérome Martineau-Ricotti; Philippe Bussonnet; Benoît Alziary; Claud Angel; Jean-Pierre Lembert; Patrick Gauthier; Yochiko Seffer; Brian Godding
- Website: magmamusic.org/en/home

Magma is a French progressive rock band founded in Paris in 1969 by self-taught drummer Christian Vander, who claimed as his inspiration a "vision of humanity's spiritual and ecological future" that profoundly disturbed him. The style of progressive rock that Vander developed with Magma is termed "Zeuhl" and has been applied to other bands in France operating in the same period, and to some recent Japanese bands.

Vander created a fictional language, Kobaïan, in which most lyrics are sung. In a 1977 interview with Vander and long-time Magma vocalist Klaus Blasquiz, Blasquiz said that Kobaïan is a "phonetic language made by elements of the Slavonic and Germanic languages to be able to express some things musically. The language has of course a content, but not word by word." Vander himself has said, "When I wrote, the sounds [of Kobaïan] came naturally with it—I didn't intellectualise the process by saying 'Ok, now I'm going to write some words in a particular language', it was really sounds that were coming at the same time as the music." In the course of their first album, the band tells the story of a group of people fleeing a doomed Earth to settle on the planet Kobaïa. Subsequently, conflict arises when the Kobaïans - descendants of the original colonists - encounter other Earth refugees. Later albums tell different stories set in more ancient times; however, the Kobaïan language remains an integral part of the music.

In 1986, the French label Seventh Records was founded to republish Magma's and Vander's work. Over the years, Seventh has also released albums by related artists such as Stella Vander, Patrick Gauthier, and Collectif Mu.

== History ==
=== Early years (1967–1972) ===
Band logo and inscription

In early 1967, drummer Christian Vander played in the Wurdalaks and Cruciferius Lobonz, two rhythm and blues bands. With these groups, he wrote his first compositions, "Nogma" and "Atumba". The death of John Coltrane saddened Vander, who left the groups and traveled to Italy. He returned to France in 1969 and met saxophonist René Garber and bassist and conductor Laurent Thibault. Together with singer Lucien Zabuski and organist Francis Moze, they created the group Univeria Zekt Magma Composedra Arguezdra, shortened to Magma.

After their first tour, Magma experienced significant lineup turnover. Vocalist Lucien Zabuski was replaced with Klaus Blasquiz, and pianist Eddie Rabin, double bassist Jacky Vidal, and guitarist Claude Engel also joined the group. The group worked on material for three months in a house in the Chevreuse Valley. Eddie Rabin was replaced by François Cahen on keyboards, and Laurent Thibault abandoned bass to devote himself to production. Francis Moze became the new bassist. The band also expanded with a brass section, consisting of Teddy Lasry on saxophone and clarinet, Richard Raux on saxophone and flute, and Paco Charlery on trumpet. The group's first album, Kobaïa, was released in the spring of 1970 by Philips Records. The group caused a sensation but audience reactions were mixed.

After the album was released, Claude Engel, Richard Raux, and Paco Charlery left the group. Jeff Seffer replaced Raux on saxophone, and Louis Toesca replaced Charlery on trumpet. Their second album, 1001° Centigrades, was released in April 1971. The album won the band more exposure, including a performance at the Montreux Jazz Festival.

In January 1972, Magma released the album The Unnamables under the alias Univeria Zekt. Intended as an introduction to Magma's sound, the album featured less contributions from Vander and was detached from storylines featured in earlier albums. It would sell only 1,500 copies. This incarnation of the band would tour relentlessly throughout 1972, recording their last original song in September 1972 for Jean Yanne's 1973 film Moi y'en a vouloir des sous, which remains unreleased. Many musicians would leave the band towards the end of the year, including François Cahen, Louis Toesca, Jeff Seffer, and Francis Moze.

=== Mëkanïk Dëstruktïẁ Kömmandöh, to Üdü Wüdü (1973–1977) ===
In 1973, Vander formed a new lineup of the band, adding Stella Vander as a second vocalist, Claude Olmos on guitar, Jannick Top replacing Francis Moze on bass, René Garber on saxophone and clarinet, and Jean-Luc Manderlier on keyboards, among others. This new version of the band would release their most famous work Mëkanïk Dëstruktïẁ Kömmandöh, which would later become their most acclaimed album, and gave them international fame, including a spot at the prestigious Newport Jazz Festival, their first American performance.

A lineup of Vander, Blasquiz, Jean-Pierre Lembert and René Garber would perform a demo of their piece "Ẁurdah Ïtah" on January 3, 1972. This recording was bootlegged and used as the soundtrack for Yvan Lagrange's 1972 film Tristan et Iseult without Magma's knowledge or permission. In 1974, after learning of Lagrange's film, Vander would approach him with an ultimatum to finance a re-recording or face legal action, to which Lagrange agreed, and under Vander's name, the band begrudgingly released Ẁurdah Ïtah under the name of Tristan et Iseult; the album has been re-released in its intended format as Magma's fourth studio album since 1989.

Magma were already in the midst of preparation for their next album, Köhntarkösz, which was recorded less than a month later and released in September of that year. It was successful among fans, but not received as well among the public as Mëkanïk Dëstruktïẁ Kömmandöh. The band would then go on a long, year-and-a-half long tour of France, and after another member shakeup (Bernard Paganotti replacing Jannick Top on bass, Didier Lockwood added as a violinist, Jean-Pol Asseline and Benoît Widemann replacing Gérard Bikialo on keyboards, and Gabriel Federow replacing Claude Olmos on guitar), released their first live album, Live / Hhaï, in December 1975, recorded at the Taverne de l'Olympia in Paris.

In 1976, Top would be sought by Vander to rejoin the band as a co-leader; he would accept and split recording duties for Üdü Ẁüdü. He would continue with the band until the end of the year, due to wanting to move on from the band. Most musicians who had worked with Vander from 1972 left the band throughout the same time - the band would briefly disband before reforming in spring 1977. Jean DeAntoni would replace Gabriel Federow on guitar, Guy Delacroix replacing Bernard Paganotti on bass, and Clement Bailly was hired as a second drummer.

=== Attahk, Merci, and changing sound (1978–1984) ===
In 1978, Magma released the album Attahk. Vying for more commercial success, the album included elements of soul, rhythm & blues, and funk music.

Celebrating 10 years as a band, in 1980, Magma performed three nights at L'Olympia in Paris, with guest appearances from many of the group's past musicians. These were recorded and released as Retrospektïẁ (Parts I+II) and Retrospektïẁ (Part III).

In early 1980, the band had attempted to record a new studio album, but failed. In 1981, Magma would play a number of shows around France, including a three-week residency at Paris's Bobino in 1981, which was recorded and filmed, and later released as Concert Bobino 1981; this concert would feature some discarded material, including "Retrovision", which Vander has gone at length to say he will never record again.

In 1982, Vander started work on a passion project to celebrate jazz and John Coltrane's life. This would result in Merci. Essentially a Vander solo album, it would take two years of continuous recording sessions before a provisional unmixed version was released in late 1984, with a finalised version released in May 1985.

=== Transition into Offering (1983–1996) ===
By 1983, Magma had metamorphosised into a more improvised and unstructured style. This new incarnation of the band would become known as Offering, the "improvised side of Magma"; the band did not breakup and the current lineup was kept the same through projects. Offering would continue to perform both new material and old, and when performing live, often the band was still referred to as Magma. An example of this was in 1988, when professional snooker champion Steve Davis would convince Vander to perform three shows at the Bloomsbury Theatre in London as Magma; most material performed was from Offering.

Offering would release three albums, Offering I-II (1986), Offering III-IV (1990), and A Fiïèh (1993). The first and third albums were positively received, while the second received mixed reception. The piece Les cygnes et les corbeaux, regularly played live by the band, was teased as a fourth studio album. This would later be released as a Christian Vander solo album in 2002.

=== Reformation (1996–present) ===
In 1995, Offering would stop regularly performing. The following year, friend Bernard Ivan asked Vander if he was considering reviving Magma, as he was confident he could get Vander concert dates. Vander agreed, but confessed that he didn't think there would be any remaining interest in the band. Ivan came back to Vander to tell him he fully booked a number of gigs for Magma and Vander, surprised, quickly gathered friends in the music scene and the lineup from Offering to create a new 14-piece Magma.

Vander decided to revive some sections of tracks he had written back in 1972-1973 while working on Köhntarkösz on this new tour. Eventually, these merged into one big composition K.A (Köhntarkösz Anteria), which released in 2004 to acclaim and surprise at their comeback. K.A is conceptually the prequel to Köhntarkösz, which was then followed up by a sequel Ëmëhntëhtt-Ré in 2009, ending a narrative trilogy between the three albums.

In 2012, Magma released Félicité Thösz. Two years later the band released Rïah Sahïltaahk, a complete re-recording of the side-long suite from 1971's 1001° Centigrades, which Vander never felt satisfied with the arrangement of. This was followed by Šlaǧ Tanƶ in 2015.

In 2019, the band released Zëss, a live piece performed since the late 1970s that was never recorded in studio. This version featured the City Of Prague Philharmonic Orchestra, the first Magma album to feature an orchestra.

On 30 September 2022 Magma released their fifteenth album Kartëhl. The album is a collective work of the band members. The copyright proceeds of the track Dëhndë were donated to a charity for people with autism.

By end of 2025, bassist Jimmy Top, son of Jannick Top, left the band and was replaced by Charles Lucas.

In late May 2026, the band announced a new 2026-2027 tour titled the Zeuhl Kommandöh Tour, revealing a new stripped down lineup with six members.

== Kobaïan ==
Kobaïan
- Created by: Christian Vander
- Date: 1969
- Setting and usage: Lyrics for a musical group
- Purpose: constructed languages: artistic languages; fictional languages; Kobaïan
- Sources: Based on elements of Slavic and Germanic languages and the scat-yodeling vocal style of Leon Thomas

Language codes
- ISO 639-3: None (mis)
- Glottolog: None
- IETF: art-x-kobaian

Kobaïan is a lyrical language created by Christian Vander for Magma. It is the language of Kobaïa, a fictional planet invented by Vander and the setting for a musical "space opera" sung in Kobaïan by Magma on fifteen concept albums.

=== Development ===
French drummer and composer Christian Vander formed Magma in late 1969 after the death of American jazz musician and composer John Coltrane. Vander said the saxophonist was his single greatest inspiration and he believed “music had to start over” after Coltrane’s death. Magma's first album, Magma (later reissued as Kobaïa), told a story of refugees fleeing a future Earth and settling on a fictional planet called Kobaïa. The lyrics were all in Kobaïan (except the title track, sung mostly in English), a language Vander constructed for the album, some sung by soloists and others by "massive quasi-operatic choruses". Over the next three decades, Magma have made fifteen albums that continues the mythology of Kobaïa, all sung in Kobaïan.

Vander (his Kobaïan name is Zëbëhn Straïn dë Ğeuštaah) said in an interview that he invented Kobaïan for Magma because "French just wasn't expressive enough. Either for the story or for the sound of the music". He said that the language developed in parallel with the music, that sounds appeared as he was composing on a piano. Vander based Kobaïan in part on elements of Slavic and Germanic languages and in part on the scat-yodeling vocal style of American avant-garde jazz singer Leon Thomas. The subsequent expansion of the language became a group effort, and as Magma's personnel changed, so new ideas were incorporated into the language (and the music).

British music critic Ian MacDonald said that Kobaïan is "phonetic, not semantic", and that it is based on "sonorities, not on applied meanings". One of Magma's singers, Klaus Blasquiz, described Kobaïan as "a language of the heart" whose words are "inseparable from the music". Magma expert Michael Draine said "the abstraction provided by the Kobaïan verse seems to inspire Magma's singers to heights of emotional abandon rarely permitted by conventional lyrics".

The Kobaïan lyrics on Magma's albums were generally not translated (though both Kobaïan lyrics and an English translation were provided for the first UK release on A&M of Mëkanïk Dëstruktïẁ Kömmandöh), but clues to the unfolding story of Kobaïa were given in French in the albums' liner notes. While the original intent of the language was to avoid over-scrutiny, unofficial Kobaïan online lexicons were created by Magma fans, and Vander himself has since translated many of the words.

=== Influence ===
Christian Vander called Magma's music "Zeuhl" (Kobaïan for "celestial"), and it influenced a number of other (mostly French) bands, including Zao (France), Art Zoyd (France) and Univers Zero (Belgium). Zeuhl later became a music genre which was used to describe music similar to that of Magma. Several Japanese Zeuhl bands also sprang up, including Ruins and Kōenji Hyakkei, whose lyrics are also sung in a constructed language similar to Kobaïan.

== Style and influences ==
Christian Vander has described the style of progressive rock that he developed with Magma in France from 1969 onwards as "zeuhl". Dominique Leone, writing for Pitchfork, says the style is "about what you'd expect an alien rock opera to sound like: massed, chanted choral motifs, martial, repetitive percussion, sudden bursts of explosive improv and just as unexpected lapses into eerie, minimalist trance-rock." The term comes from Kobaïan, the fictional language created by Vander for Magma. He has said that it means celestial; that "Zeuhl music means 'vibratory music'" and that zeuhl is "L'esprit au travers de la matière. That is Zeuhl. Zeuhl is also the sound which you can feel vibrating in your belly. Pronounce the word Zeuhl very slowly, and stress the letter 'z' at the beginning, and you will feel your body vibrating."

Originally applied solely to the music of Magma, the term "zeuhl" was eventually used to describe the similar music produced by French bands beginning in the 1970s. In addition to Magma, bands who are associated with the term include: Happy Family, Kōenji Hyakkei, and Ruins from Japan, and French band Zao.

The Chicago Reader wrote that Magma's music "could arguably be labeled modern classical, progressive rock, free jazz, or even psychedelia, but it's too big for any of those boxes".

Vander was musically influenced by John Coltrane and Carl Orff.

The mythology of Kobaïa seems to be strongly influenced by the esoteric The Urantia Book, a kind of pseudo-bible that combines religious elements of various origins with scientific findings and science fiction. Furthermore, the motifs surrounding the myth of Kobaïa, particularly in the first three albums, have similarities with Johannes Kepler's novel Somnium from 1634, Francis Godwin's novel The Man in the Moone from 1638 and Cyrano de Bergerac's The Other World (Orig. L'autre monde), whose works gained new popularity in France in the 1970s. With the album Theusz Hamthaak, the motifs increasingly approach modern science fiction literature of the 20th century such as H. G. Wells' The Time Machine, Olaf Stapledon's The Last and the First Men and The Star Maker of 1930 or Arthur C. Clarke's Childhood's End from 1953. However, Vander has not yet commented directly on the sources of his inspirations.

=== Legacy ===
The band is widely considered to be musically adventurous and imaginative among music critics. Magma uses choirs extensively in a way reminiscent of the composer Carl Orff. Magma's music is also highly influenced by jazz saxophone player John Coltrane, and Vander has said that "it is still Coltrane who actually gives me the real material to work on, to be able to move on".

Many of the musicians who have played with Magma have also formed solo projects or spinoff acts. The Kobaïan term Zeuhl has come to refer to the musical style of these bands and the French jazz fusion/symphonic rock scene that grew around them. Besides Christian Vander, other well-known Magma alumni include the violinist Didier Lockwood, bassist-composer Jannick "Janik" Top, and spinoff act Weidorje.

==== Fandom ====
The band has a number of high-profile fans. Punk rock singer Johnny Rotten, metal musician Kristoffer Rygg, Steven Wilson of Porcupine Tree, Mikael Åkerfeldt of Opeth, Bruce Dickinson of Iron Maiden, Cattle Decapitation vocalist Travis Ryan, magician Penn Jillette, and Chilean filmmaker Alejandro Jodorowsky have all stated their admiration of the band.

In the 1980s, British World champion snooker player Steve Davis declared himself a passionate follower of the band since his youth and used some of his winnings to promote a series of concerts by Magma in London.

Television journalist Antoine de Caunes wrote a biography of the band entitled Magma.

In 2017, documentary filmmaker Laurent Goldstein directed To Life, Death and Beyond – The Music of Magma. Interviewees include Christian Vander, Stella Vander, James MacGaw, Trey Gunn, Robert Trujillo, and Jello Biafra.

== Personnel ==
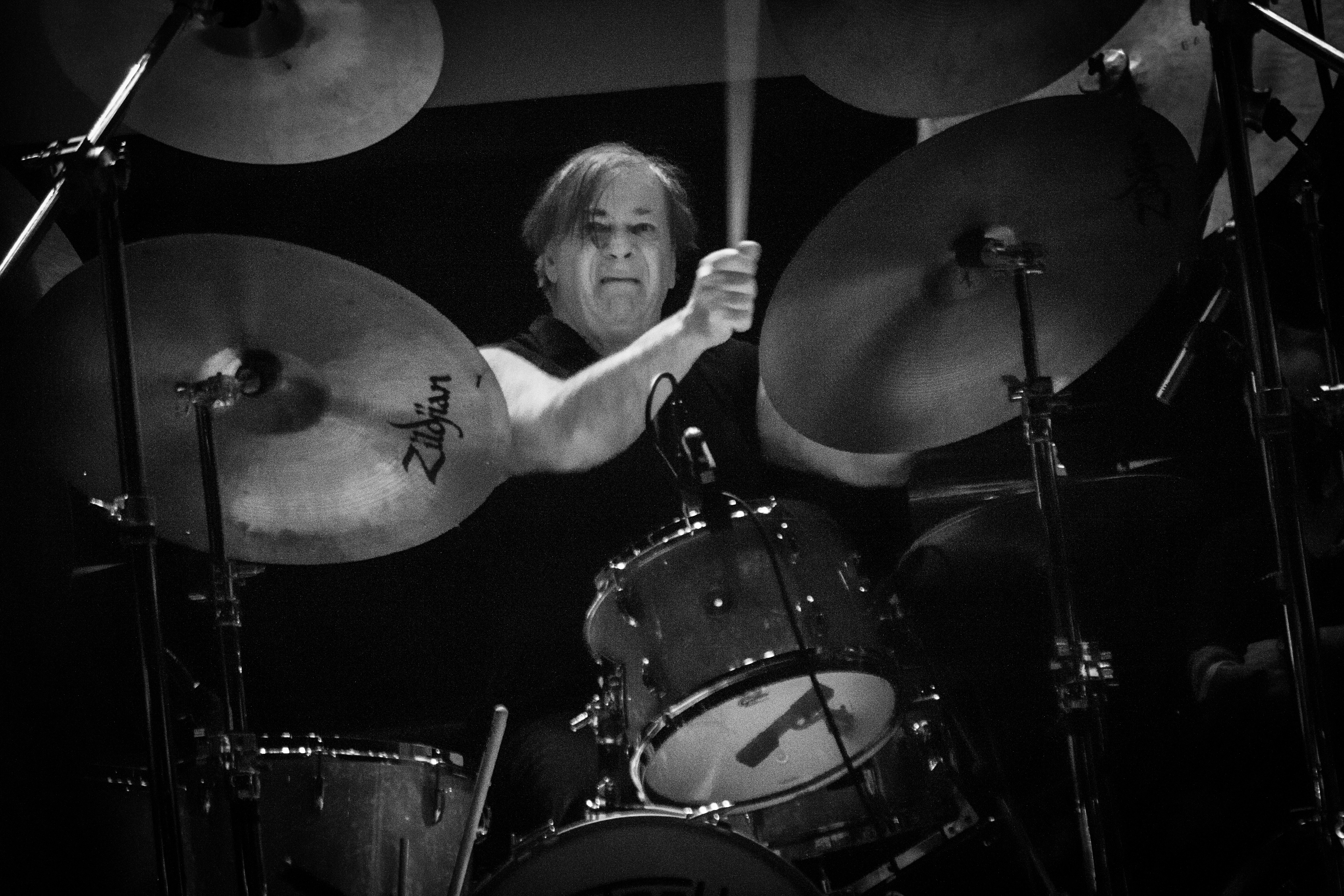
Christian Vander at Roadburn Festival 2017

=== Members ===
- Violinist: Didier Lockwood
- Guitarists: Claude Engel, Claude Olmos, Gabriel Federow, Marc Fosset, James Mac Gaw, Jean-Luc Chevalier (currently guitarist with Tri Yann ), Jim Grandcamp, Rudy Blas, Brian Godding
- Bassists: Jannick Top, Bernard Paganotti, Guy Delacroix, Francis Moze, Laurent Thibault, Michel Hervé, Dominique Bertram, Marc Éliard (currently bassist with Indochine), Philippe Bussonnet, Jimmy Top, Charles Lucas
- Keyboardists: Benoît Widemann, Michel Graillier, Gérard Bikialo, Jean Luc Manderlier, François "Faton" Cahen (former leader of the group Zao), Guy Khalifa, Sofia Domancich, Patrick Gauthier, Simon Goubert, Pierre-Michel Sivadier, Jean Pol Asseline, Jean Pierre Fouquey, Frédéric D'Oelsnitz, Benoît Alziari (plus vibraphone and theremin), Emmanuel Borghi, Bruno Ruder, Thierry Eliez
- Saxophonists: Teddy Lasry, Richard Raux, Alain Guillard, René Garber and Jeff "Yochk’o" Seffer
- Trumpeters: Louis Toesca and Yvon Guillard
- Male vocalists: Klaus Blasquiz, Christian Vander, Guy Khalifa, Antoine Paganotti and Hervé Aknin
- Female vocalists: Stella Vander, Isabelle Feuillebois, Maria Popkiewicz, Liza de Luxe, Himiko Paganotti, Sandrine Fougère, Sandrine Destefanis, Sylvie Fisichella, Laura Guarrato
- Drummers and percussionists: Christian Vander, Michel Garrec, Doudou Weiss, Simon Goubert, Clément Bailly, Claude Salmiéri, François Laizeau
History of the members (a hidden table)

Period	Formation	Recording
Early 1969	Lucien Zabuski – vocals; Jean-Jacques Ferry – guitar; Eric Grimbert – guitar; Francis Moze – keyboards; Laurent Thibault – bass; Christian Vander – drums, percussion, vocals	
April 1969 – August 1969	Lucien Zabuski – vocals; Claude Engel – guitar; René Garber – saxophone, clarinet; Guy Marco – trumpet; René Morizur – saxophone; Eddy Rabbin – keyboards; Laurent Thibault – bass; Christian Vander – drums, percussion, vocals	
August 1969 – October 1969	Klaus Blasquiz – vocals; Claude Engel – guitar; René Garber – saxophone, clarinet; Guy Marco – trumpet; René Morizur – saxophone; Eddy Rabbin – keyboards; Laurent Thibault – bass; Christian Vander – drums, percussion, vocals	
October 1969 – January 1970	Klaus Blasquiz – vocals, percussion; Claude Engel – guitar; René Garber – saxophone, clarinet; Alain "Paco" Charlery – trumpet; Richard Raux – saxophone, flute; François Cahen – keyboards; Laurent Thibault – bass; Jacky Vidal – double bass; Christian Vander – drums, percussion, vocals	
January 1970 – August 1970	Klaus Blasquiz – vocals, percussion; Claude Engel – guitar, flute, vocals; Alain "Paco" Charlery – trumpet, percussion; Teddy Lasry – saxophone, flute, woodwinds; Richard Raux – saxophones, flute; François Cahen – keyboards; Francis Moze – bass, double bass; Christian Vander – drums, vocals	Magma (1970)
October 1970 – December 1970	Klaus Blasquiz – vocals, percussion; Claude Engel – guitar; Teddy Lasry – clarinet, saxophone, flute; Jeff Seffer – saxophone, bass clarinet; François Cahen – keyboards; Francis Moze – bass; Christian Vander – drums, percussion, vocals	
mid January 1971 – end December 1971	Klaus Blasquiz – vocals, percussion; Claude Engel – guitar (not on 1001° Centigrades); Teddy Lasry – clarinet, saxophone, flute; Jeff Seffer – saxophone, bass clarinet; Louis Toesca – trumpet (not on The Unnamables); François Cahen – keyboards; Francis Moze – bass; Christian Vander – drums, percussion, vocals; Lucien Zabuski – vocals (studio only on The Unnamables); Lionel Ledissez – vocals (studio only on The Unnamables); Tito Puentes – trumpet (studio only on The Unnamables)	1001° Centigrades (1971); Univeria Zekt - The Unnamables (1972)
end December 1971 – beginning January 1972	Klaus Blasquiz – vocals; Teddy Lasry – clarinet, saxophone, flute; Jeff Seffer – saxophone, bass clarinet; Louis Toesca – trumpet; François Cahen – keyboards; Jean-Luc Manderlier – keyboards; Francis Moze – bass; Christian Vander – drums, percussion, vocals; Daniel Denis – percussion, drums (guest)	
beginning January 1972 – end December 1972	Klaus Blasquiz – vocals, percussion; Teddy Lasry – clarinet, saxophone, flute; Jeff Seffer – saxophone, bass clarinet; Louis Toesca – trumpet; François Cahen – keyboards; Jean-Luc Manderlier – keyboards; Francis Moze – bass; Christian Vander – drums, percussion, vocals	
end December 1972 – mid January 1973	Klaus Blasquiz – vocals, percussions; Stella Vander – vocals; René Garber – saxophone, clarinet; Jean-Luc Manderlier – keyboards; Michel Graillier – keyboards (not on Mëkanïk Kömmandöh); Jean-Pierre Lambert – bass; Christian Vander – drums, percussion, vocals	Akt X: Mëkanïk Kömmandöh (1989)
mid January 1973 – March 1973	Klaus Blasquiz – vocals, percussion; Stella Vander – vocals; Marc Fosset – guitar; Claude Olmos – guitar; René Garber – saxophone, clarinet; Jean-Luc Manderlier – keyboards; Gérard Bikialo – keyboards; Jean-Pierre Lembert – bass; Christian Vander – drums, percussion, vocals	
March 1973 – May 1973	Klaus Blasquiz – vocals, percussion; Stella Vander – vocals; Claude Olmos – guitar; René Garber – saxophone, bass clarinet; Teddy Lasry – clarinet, saxophone, flute; Jean-Luc Manderlier – keyboards; Jannick Top – bass, cello, piano, vocals; Christian Vander – drums, percussion, piano, vocals	Mëkanïk Dëstruktïẁ Kömmandöh (1973)
June 1973 – July 1973	Klaus Blasquiz – vocals, percussion; Stella Vander – vocals; Claude Olmos – guitar; René Garber – saxophone, clarinet; Teddy Lasry – saxophone, flute; Michel Graillier – keyboards; Jannick Top – bass; Christian Vander – drums, percussion, vocals; Randy Brecker – trumpet (guest July 1973 US tour); Michael Brecker – saxophone (guest July 1973 US tour); Bill Watrous – trombone (guest July 1973 US tour)	
August 1973 – end December 1973	Klaus Blasquiz – vocals, percussion; Stella Vander – vocals; Claude Olmos – guitar; René Garber – saxophone, clarinet; Michel Graillier – keyboards; Jannick Top – bass; Christian Vander – drums, percussion, vocals	
January 1974 – March 1974	Klaus Blasquiz – vocals, percussion; Claude Olmos – guitar; Michel Graillier – keyboards; Gérard Bikialo – keyboards; Jannick Top – bass; Christian Vander – drums, percussion, vocals	Akt XIII: BBC 1974 Londres (1999); Zühn Ẁöhl Ünsai - Live 1974 (2014); Akt XVIII: Marquee Londres 17 Mars 1974 (2018)
March 1974 – August 1974	Klaus Blasquiz – vocals, percussion; Stella Vander – vocals, percussion; Claude Olmos – guitar (not on Köhntarkösz); Teddy Lasry – saxophone, flute; Gérard Bikialo – keyboards; Jannick Top – bass, piano, cello, vocals; Christian Vander – drums, percussion, piano, vocals; Brian Godding – guitar (studio only on Köhntarkösz); Michel Graillier – keyboards (studio only on Köhntarkösz)	Köhntarkösz (1974)
September 1974 – November 1974	Klaus Blasquiz – vocals, percussion; Stella Vander – vocals, percussion; Gabriel Federow – guitar; Didier Lockwood – violin; Francis Lockwood – keyboards (briefly, replaced by Jean-Pol Asseline); Jean-Pol Asseline – keyboards; Benoît Widemann – keyboards; Jannick Top – bass; Christian Vander – drums, percussion, vocals	
January 1975 – August 1975	Klaus Blasquiz – vocals, percussion; Stella Vander – vocals, percussion; Gabriel Federow – guitar; Didier Lockwood – violin; Jean-Pol Asseline – keyboards; Benoît Widemann – keyboards; Bernard Paganotti – bass; Christian Vander – drums, percussion, vocals	Live/Hhaï (1975)
September 1975 – February 1976	Klaus Blasquiz – vocals, percussion; Stella Vander – vocals, percussion; Gabriel Federow – guitar; Didier Lockwood – violin; Benoît Widemann – keyboards; Patrick Gauthier – keyboards; Bernard Paganotti – bass; Christian Vander – drums, percussion, vocals	Akt IV: Théâtre du Taur Concert 1975 Toulouse (1994)
March 1976 – September 1976 (first split)	Klaus Blasquiz – vocals, percussion; Stella Vander – vocals; Liza Deluxe – vocals (not on Concert 1976 Opéra de Reims); Gabriel Federow – guitar; Didier Lockwood – violin; Benoît Widemann – keyboards; Patrick Gauthier – keyboards; Bernard Paganotti – bass, percussion, vocals; Christian Vander – drums, percussion, keyboards, vocals; Lucille Cullaz – vocals (studio only on Üdü Ẁüdü); Catherine Szpira – vocals (studio only on Üdü Ẁüdü); Pierre Dutour – trumpets (studio only on Üdü Ẁüdü); Alain Hatot – saxophones (studio only on Üdü Ẁüdü); Michel Graillier – keyboards (studio only on Üdü Ẁüdü); Jannick Top – bass, fret-cello, synthesizer, percussion, horn arrangement, vocals (studio only on Üdü Ẁüdü)	Üdü Ẁüdü (1976); Akt IX: Concert 1976 Opéra de Reims (1996)
November 1976 – January 1977 (first reformation)	Klaus Blasquiz – vocals, percussions; Stella Vander – vocals, percussions; Gabriel Federow – guitar; Benoît Widemann – keyboards; Jean-Pol Asseline – keyboards; Bernard Paganotti – bass; Christian Vander – drums, percussion, vocals	
January 1977 – mid 1977	Klaus Blasquiz – vocals; Stella Vander – vocals; Florence Bertaux – vocals; Jean De Antoni – guitar; Benoît Widemann – keyboards; Guy Delacroix – bass; Christian Vander – drums, percussion, vocals; Clément Bailly – drums (guest)	
mid 1977 – end 1977	Klaus Blasquiz – vocals; Stella Vander – vocals; Liza Deluxe – vocals; Jean De Antoni – guitar; Benoît Widemann – keyboards; Guy Delacroix – bass; Christian Vander – drums, percussion, vocals; Clément Bailly – second drums (guest) (not on Attahk); Jacques Bolognesi – trombone (studio only on Attahk); Tony Russo – trumpet (studio only on Attahk)	Attahk (1977)
January 1978 – mid 1978	Klaus Blasquiz – vocals, percussion; Stella Vander – vocals, percussion; Liza Deluxe – vocals; René Garber – clarinet; Benoît Widemann – keyboards; Guy Delacroix – bass; Christian Vander – drums, percussion, vocals	
mid 1978 – November 1978 (second split)	Klaus Blasquiz – vocals, percussion; Stella Vander – vocals; Liza Deluxe – vocals; Maria Popkiewicz – vocals; Jean-Luc Chevalier – guitar, bass; René Garber – clarinet; André Hervé – keyboards; Guy Delacroix – bass; Christian Vander – drums, percussion, vocals	
spring 1979 – mid 1979 (second reformation)	Klaus Blasquiz – vocals; Stella Vander – vocals; Liza Deluxe – vocals; Maria Popkiewicz – vocals; Jean-Luc Chevalier – guitar, bass; André Hervé – keyboards; Michel Hervé – bass; Christian Vander – drums, percussion, vocals	Akt XV: Bourges 1979 (2020)
mid 1979 – end 1979	Stella Vander – vocals; Liza Deluxe – vocals; Maria Popkiewicz – vocals; Jean-Luc Chevalier – guitar, bass; Jean De Antoni – guitar; André Hervé – keyboards; Benoît Widemann – keyboards; Michel Hervé – bass; Christian Vander – drums, percussion, vocals	
end 1979 – January 1980	Stella Vander – vocals, percussion; Liza Deluxe – vocals; Maria Popkiewicz – vocals; Jean-Michel Kajdan – guitar; Benoît Widemann – keyboards; Francis Lockwood – keyboards; Michel Hervé – bass; Dominique Bertram – bass; Christian Vander – drums, percussion, vocals	
January 1980 – June 1980	Stella Vander – vocals; Liza Deluxe – vocals; Maria Popkiewicz – vocals; Klaus Blasquiz – vocals, percussion; Jean-Luc Chevalier – guitar; Benoît Widemann – keyboards; Francis Lockwood – keyboards; Michel Hervé – bass; Dominique Bertram – bass; Christian Vander – drums, percussion, vocals	
June 1980 – end 1980 (reunion of old members for 3 shows)	Stella Vander – vocals; Liza Deluxe – vocals; Maria Popkiewicz – vocals; Klaus Blasquiz – vocals; Guy Khalifa – vocals (not on Retrospektïẁ I+II); Claire Laborde – vocals (not on Retrospektïẁ III); Jean-Luc Chevalier – guitar, bass; Claude Engel – guitar (not on Retrospektïẁ); Gabriel Federow – guitar; Didier Lockwood – violin; Teddy Lasry – flute, saxophone (not on Retrospektïẁ); René Garber – saxophone, clarinet (not on Retrospektïẁ I+II); Jeff Seffer – saxophone (not on Retrospektïẁ); Louis Toesca – trumpet (not on Retrospektïẁ); Benoît Widemann – keyboards; Patrick Gauthier – keyboards; François Cahen – keyboards (not on Retrospektïẁ); Jean-Pierre Fouquey – keyboards (not on Retrospektïẁ I+II); Dominique Bertram – bass (not on Retrospektïẁ I+II); Bernard Paganotti – bass, guitar; Francis Moze – bass, keyboards (not on Retrospektïẁ); Christian Vander – drums, percussion, vocals; François Laizeau – drums, percussion (not on Retrospektïẁ I+II)	Retrospektïẁ (Parts I+II) (1981); Retrospektïẁ (Part III) (1981)
end 1980 – mid 1981	Stella Vander – vocals, percussion; Liza Deluxe – vocals; Maria Popkiewicz – vocals (not on Concert Bobino 1981); Guy Khalifa – vocals, keyboards; Jean-Luc Chevalier – guitar, bass; Jean-Michel Kajdan – guitar (not on Concert Bobino 1981); René Garber – clarinet (not on Concert Bobino 1981); Alain Guillard – wind instruments & trumpet; Yvon Guillard – wind instruments & saxophone; Arrigo Lorenzi – saxophone (not on Concert Bobino 1981); Richard Raux – saxophone & flute (not on Concert Bobino 1981); Benoît Widemann – keyboards; Francis Lockwood – keyboards (not on Concert Bobino 1981); Jean-Pierre Fouquey – piano (not on Concert Bobino 1981); Dominique Bertram – bass; Marc Éliard – bass (not on Concert Bobino 1981); Jannick Top – bass (not on Concert Bobino 1981); Christian Vander – drums, percussion, vocals; Francois Laizeau – drums and percussion (not on Concert Bobino 1981); Doudou Weiss – drums	Akt V-VI: Concert Bobino 1981 (1995)
mid 1981 – beginning 1982	Stella Vander – vocals, percussion; Liza Deluxe – vocals; Maria Popkiewicz – vocals; Guy Khalifa – vocals; Jean-Luc Chevalier – guitar; Jean-Michel Kajdan – guitar; René Garber – saxophone & clarinet; Alain Guillard – wind instruments & trumpet; Yvon Guillard – wind instruments & saxophone; Arrigo Lorenzi – saxophone; Benoît Widemann – keyboards; Jean-Pierre Fouquey – piano; Patrick Gauthier – keyboards; Dominique Bertram – bass; Marc Éliard – bass; Christian Vander – drums, percussion, vocals; Doudou Weiss – drums	
beginning 1982 – mid 1982	Stella Vander – vocals; Liza Deluxe – vocals; Maria Popkiewicz – vocals; Jean-Luc Chevalier – guitar; René Garber – clarinet; Alain Guillard – trumpet; Yvon Guillard – saxophone; Arrigo Lorenzi – saxophone; Benoît Widemann – keyboards; Jean-Pierre Fouquey – piano; Patrick Gauthier – keyboards; Dominique Bertram – bass; Marc Éliard – bass; Christian Vander – drums, percussion, vocals; Francois Kokelaere – percussion	
mid 1982 – beginning 1983	Stella Vander – vocals; Liza Deluxe – vocals; Maria Popkiewicz – vocals; Guy Khalifa – vocals; Jean-Luc Chevalier – guitar; René Garber – clarinet & saxophone; Alain Guillard – trumpet; Yvon Guillard – saxophone; Arrigo Lorenzi – saxophone; Michel Gaucher – saxophone; Denis Leloup – trombone; Christian Martinez – trumpet; Freddy Opsepian – trumpet; Jean-Pierre Fouquey – piano; Simon Goubert – keyboards; Michel Graillier – keyboards; Dominique Bertram – bass; Marc Éliard – bass; Christian Vander – drums, percussion, vocals; Francois Kokelaere – percussion; François Laizeau – percussion	
beginning 1983 – end 1983	Stella Vander – vocals; Liza Deluxe – vocals; Guy Khalifa – vocals; Jean-Luc Chevalier – guitar; Christian Martinez – trumpet; Jean-Pierre Fouquey – piano; Simon Goubert – keyboards; Michel Graillier – keyboards; Patrick Gauthier – keyboards; Dominique Bertram – bass; Marc Éliard – bass; Sylvin Marc – bass; Christian Vander – drums, percussion, vocals; Pierre Moerlen – drums (guest)	
end 1983 – end 1984	Stella Vander – vocals; Liza Deluxe – vocals; Guy Khalifa – vocals; Alex Ferrand – vocals; Jean-Luc Chevalier – guitar; Christian Martinez – trumpet; Michel Gaucher – saxophone; René Garber – clarinet & saxophone; Denis Leloup – trombone; Freddy Opsepian – trumpet; Jean-Pierre Fouquey – piano; Simon Goubert – keyboards; Dominique Bertram – bass; Christian Vander – drums, percussion, vocals; François Laizeau – percussion; Steve Shehan – percussion	Merci (1985)
end 1984 – beginning 1985	Stella Vander – vocals; Lisa Deluxe – vocals; Guy Khalifa – vocals; Jean-Pierre Fouquey – piano; Jean-Luc Chevalier – guitar; Simon Goubert – keyboards; Dominique Bertram – bass; Guy Delacroix – bass; Jean-Marc Jafet – bass; Francis Moze – bass; Rémy Sarrazin – bass; Frédéric Briet – double bass; Christian Vander – drums, percussion, vocals; Pierre Marcault – percussion; Claude Salmieri – drums (guest); Michel Le Bars – drums (guest)	
1986 – 1990 solo projects of Christian Vander, Magma on stand by
February 1990 with OFFERING	Stella Vander – vocals; Klaus Blasquiz – vocals; Addie Déat – vocals; Jean-Francois Déat – vocals, keyboards; Isabelle Feuillebois – vocals; Julie Vander – vocals; Franck Vedel – guitar; Emmanuel Borghi – keyboards; Pierre-Michel Sivadier – keyboards; Marc Éliard – bass; Jean-Marc Duroure – bass; Philippe Dardelle – double bass; Christian Vander – drums, percussion, vocals; Marc Delouya – drums; Jean-Claude Buire – percussion	
1991	Julie Vander – vocals; Stella Vander – vocals; Isabelle Feuillebois – vocals; Addie Déat – vocals, keyboards; Jean-François Déat – vocals, keyboards; Emmanuel Borghi – keyboards; Pierre-Michel Sivadier – keyboards; Christian Vander – drums	
1992	Stella Vander – vocals; Klaus Blasquiz – vocals; Didier Lockwood – violin; Antoine Paganotti – vocals, drums; Patrick Gauthier – keyboards; Christian Vander – drums	
1992 – 1996	Christian Vander – drums, vocals & composer; Stella Vander – vocals; Julie Vander – vocals, piano; Bénédicte Ragu – vocals; Isabelle Feuillebois – vocals; Jean-Christophe Gamet – vocals; Alex Ferrand – vocals; Emmanuel Borghi – keyboards; Pierre-Michel Sivadier – keyboards; Philippe Dardelle – double bass; Simon Goubert – drums, keyboards & piano	
1996	Bertrand Cardiet – vocals; Stella Vander – vocals; Isabelle Feuillebois – vocals; Jean-François Déat – vocals, keyboards; Franck Vedel – guitar; Philippe Bussonnet – bass; Pierre-Michel Sivadier – keyboards; Simon Goubert – keyboards; Christian Vander – drums	
1997	Bertrand Cardiet – vocals; Stella Vander – vocals; Isabelle Feuillebois – vocals; Jean-François Déat – vocals, keyboards; Franck Vedel – guitar; Philippe Bussonnet – bass; Pierre-Michel Sivadier – keyboards; Christian Vander – drums	
October 1997 – 1998	Bertrand Cardiet – vocals; Stella Vander – vocals; Isabelle Feuillebois – vocals; James McGaw – guitar; Philippe Bussonnet – bass; Emmanuel Borghi – keyboards; Pierre-Michel Sivadier – keyboards; Christian Vander – drums	
1999 – 2001	Antoine Paganotti – vocals; Jean-Christophe Gamet – vocals, keyboards; Stella Vander – vocals; Isabelle Feuillebois – vocals; James McGaw – guitar; Philippe Bussonnet – bass; Emmanuel Borghi – keyboards; Christian Vander – drums; Claude Lamamy – vocals (Trianon concert 2000); Fred Burgazzi – trombone (Trianon concert 2000); Ronan Simon – trombone (Trianon concert 2000); Benoît Gaudiche – trumpet (Trianon concert 2000); Yannick Neveu – trumpet (Trianon concert 2000); Julie Vander – vocals (Trianon concert 2000)	
2002	Antoine Paganotti – vocals; Himiko Paganotti – vocals; Stella Vander – vocals; Isabelle Feuillebois – vocals; James Mac Gaw – guitar; Philippe Bussonnet – bass; Emmanuel Borghi – keyboards; Christian Vander – drums	
March 2003 – 2005	Antoine Paganotti – vocals; Himiko Paganotti – vocals; Stella Vander – vocals; Isabelle Feuillebois – vocals; James Mac Gaw – guitar; Philippe Bussonnet – bass; Fred d'Oelsnitz – piano; Emmanuel Borghi – keyboards; Christian Vander – drums	
beginning February 2006 – 2008	Antoine Paganotti – vocals; Himiko Paganotti – vocals; Stella Vander – vocals; Isabelle Feuillebois – vocals; James Mac Gaw – guitar; Philippe Bussonnet – bass; Benoît Alziary – vibraphone; Emmanuel Borghi – keyboards; Christian Vander – drums	
beginning February 2008 – 2012	Christian Vander – vocals, drums & composer; Hervé Aknin – vocals; Isabelle Feuillebois – vocals; Stella Vander – vocals, percussions; James Mac Gaw – guitar; Bruno Ruder – piano; Benoît Alziary – Fender Rhodes electric piano & vibraphone and thérémine; Philippe Bussonnet – bass	
beginning 2012 – December 2019	Christian Vander – vocals, drums & composer; Hervé Aknin – vocals; Isabelle Feuillebois – vocals; Stella Vander – vocals, percussions; James Mac Gaw – guitar; Bruno Ruder – keyboards; Benoît Alziary – Fender Rhodes electric piano & vibraphone and thérémine; Philippe Bussonnet – bass	
December 2019 – beginning 2022	Christian Vander – vocals, drums & composer; Hervé Aknin – vocals; Isabelle Feuillebois – vocals; Stella Vander – vocals, percussions; Sandrine Destefanis - vocals; Sylvie Fisichella - vocals; Laura Guarrato - vocals; Rudy Blas – guitar; Jimmy Top - bass; Simon Goubert - keyboards; Thierry Eliez - keyboards	
beginning 2022– end 2025	Christian Vander – vocals, drums & composer; Hervé Aknin – vocals; Isabelle Feuillebois – vocals; Stella Vander – vocals, percussions; Caroline Indjein - vocals; Sylvie Fisichella - vocals; Laura Guarrato - vocals; Rudy Blas – guitar; Jimmy Top - bass; Simon Goubert - keyboards; Thierry Eliez - keyboards	
beginning 2026 – May 2026	Christian Vander – vocals, drums & composer; Hervé Aknin – vocals; Isabelle Feuillebois – vocals; Caroline Indjein - vocals; Sylvie Fisichella - vocals; Laura Guarrato - vocals; Rudy Blas – guitar; Charles Lucas - bass; Simon Goubert - keyboards; Thierry Eliez - keyboards	
June 2026 – Present	Christian Vander – vocals, drums & composer; Hervé Aknin – vocals; Rudy Blas – guitar; Charles Lucas - bass; Simon Goubert - keyboards; Emmanuel Borghi - keyboards	

== Discography ==
Studio albums

- 1970: Kobaïa (initially Magma)
- 1971: 1001° Centigrades (or Magma 2)
- 1973: Mëkanïk Dëstruktïẁ Kömmandöh
  - 1989: Mekanïk Kommandöh (archival, original version of Mëkanïk Dëstruktïẁ Kömmandöh)
- 1974: Ẁurdah Ïtah (originally Tristan & Iseult by Christian Vander)
- 1974: Köhntarkösz
- 1976: Üdü Ẁüdü
- 1978: Attahk
- 1985: Merci
- 2004: K.A (Köhntarkösz Anteria)
- 2009: Ëmëhntëhtt-Ré
- 2012: Félicité Thösz
- 2014: Rïah Sahïltaahk
- 2015: Šlaǧ Tanƶ
- 2019: Zëss
- 2022: Kãrtëhl

Live albums

- 1975: Live/Hhaï
- 1977: Inédits
- 1981: Retrospektïẁ (Parts I+II)
- 1981: Retrospektïẁ (Part III)
- 1989: Akt X: Mekanïk Kommandöh (earlier studio recording of Mekanïk Destruktïw Kommandöh from 1973) [different from the bonus track mentioned above]
- 1992: Akt I: Les Voix De Magma (from August 2, 1992 at Douarnenez)
- 1994: Akt IV: Theatre Du Taur Concert, 1975 (from September 24, 1975)
- 1995: Akt V: Concert Bobino 1981 (from May 16, 1981)
- 1996: Akt VIII: Bruxelles 1971 (from November 12, 1971 at Theatre 140)
- 1996: Akt IX: Opéra De Reims, 1976 (from March 2, 1976)
- 1999: Akt XIII: BBC 1974 Londres (from March 14, 1974 at the London BBC studios)
- 2001: Trilogie Theusz Hamtaahk (Concert du Trianon), CD + DVD
- 2008: Akt XV: Bourges, 1979 (from April 17, 1979)
- 2009: Live in Tokyo 2005
- 2014: Zühn Wöhl Ünsai – Live 1974 (2 CD; Radio Bremen recordings)
- 2018: Akt XVIII: Marquee - Londres 17 Mars 1974
- 2021: Eskähl 2020 (Bordeaux, Toulouse, Perpignan)

EPs

- 1998: Floë Ëssi/Ëktah
- 2014: Rïah Sahïltaahk
- 2015: Šlaǧ Tanƶ

Compilations/boxsets/other material

- 1972: The Unnamables (studio album released under the alias "Univeria Zekt")
- 1986: Mythes et Légendes Vol. I (compilation)
- 1992: Akt II: Sons: Document 1973 (recorded in 1973 at Le Manor, featuring a scaled-back line-up of Christian Vander, Klaus Blasquiz, Jannick Top and René Garber)
- 1997: Kompila
- 1998: Simples
- 2008: Archiẁ I & II (included in the Studio Zünd: 40 Ans d'Evolution boxset)
- 2008: Studio Zünd: 40 Ans d'Evolution (12 disc box set, includes Kobaïa to K.A plus Archiẁ I & II)
- 2015: Köhnzert Zünd (12 CD; Live recordings, from Magma Live to Trilogie Au Trianon plus Triton Zünd and Alhambra 2009)
- 2017: Retrospektïw (3 LPs. Includes Retrospektïw I, II & III series. Limited edition of 1,500 numbered copies. Also includes the comic strip.)
- 2023: Magma une histoire de Mekanik Coffret 50 ans Mëkanïk Dëstruktïw Kömmandöh (7 LP's of different M.D.K. versions. Limited edition of 2,000 numbered copies)

Videos

- 1995: Concert Bobino 1981 (Akt VI), DVD (also released on VHS video cassette)
- 2001: Trilogie Theusz Hamtaahk (Concert du Trianon), DVD + CD
- 2006: Mythes et Légendes Epok 1, DVD
- 2006: Mythes et Légendes Epok 2, DVD
- 2007: Mythes et Légendes Epok 3, DVD
- 2008: Mythes et Légendes Epok 4, DVD
- 2013: Mythes et Légendes Epok 5, DVD
- 2016: Nihao Hamtaï – Magma in China, DVD
- 2017: Ëmëhntëhtt-Rê Trilogy, DVD

== Awards ==
In October 2020, Magma was awarded “Jazz Band of the Year” alongside Trio Viret and the Dal Sasso Big Band at the Les Victoires du Jazz awards ceremony on Radio France.

== See also ==
- Sound poetry
- Romantic Warriors II: A Progressive Music Saga About Rock in Opposition

== Reading list ==
- Blasquiz, Klaus (2013). Au coeur de Magma (in French and English). Gémenos: Le Mot et le Reste. ISBN 978-2-36054-106-5.
- Ferry (aka. Mephisto), Didier (2022). MAGMA 1975–2018. Montmorency: Seventh Records. (Didier Ferry's photographic retrospective of 40 years band history)
- Macan, Edward (1997). Rocking the classics: English progressive rock and the counterculture. Oxford University Press US. p. 1976. ISBN 0-19-509888-9.
- Bradley, Reuben (2018). From Coltrane to Magma and beyond: Interpreting musical meaning through composition (Master of Musical Arts thesis). Victoria University of Wellington.
- Holm-Hudson, Kevin (2003). "Apocalyptic Otherness: Black Music and Extraterrestrial Identity in the Music of Magma". Popular Music and Society. 26 (4). Abingdon: Routledge: 481–495. doi:10.1080/0300776032000144931. ISSN 0300-7766. (Analysis of the musical style of Magma)
- Buckley, Peter (2003). The rough guide to rock. Rough Guides. pp. 629–630. ISBN 1-84353-105-4.
- Gonin, Philippe (2010). Magma - Décryptage d'un mythe et d'une musique (in French). Marseille: Le Mot et le Reste. ISBN 978-2-36054-000-6.
