= Michel Graillier =

French jazz pianist (1946–2003)

- Born: 18 October 1946; Lens, Pas-de-Calais, France
- Died: 12 February 2003 (aged 56); Paris
- Genres: Jazz
- Occupation: Musician
- Instrument: Piano
- Years active: 1960s–2000s
- Labels: Saravah, Musica, Le Chant du Monde, EmArcy, Marge

Michel Graillier (18 October 1946, Lens, Pas-de-Calais, February 2003, Paris) was a French jazz pianist.

== Biography ==
From the ages of four to eighteen, Graillier studied classical piano in Lens, France. During adolescence, he worked as a drummer with the amateur yéyé group, Les Chaps ("The Guys").

After some preparatory classes, he enrolled in the engineering school at the ISEN in Lille, where he met the bassist Didier Levallet through whom he discovered jazz. In 1968, with a diploma in electrical engineering, he moved to Paris. He played in clubs, most notably at the Caméléon, in a trio with Aldo Romano and Jean-François Jenny-Clark. He made his first recording in 1969 with Steve Lacy. For three years, he accompanied violinist Jean-Luc Ponty. His first album for Agartha Records appeared in 1970, on which he was accompanied by Alby Cullaz and Bernard Lubat. During the same year, he recorded Pianos Puzzle with Georges Arvanitas, René Urtreger, and Maurice Vander. Due to personal problems, he withdrew from performing for a period of time.

In 1972, he was invited by drummer Christian Vander to play piano in his group Magma, which he did for two years. On some Magma albums Graillier is credited under his kobaian name Tsoï Menekaah. Following that, he played with Christian Escoudé, François Jeanneau, and others. For several years, he was the regular pianist at the club Riverbop. Here he had the opportunity to play with Americans in Paris who were on tour, such as Philly Joe Jones and Steve Grossman. He performed at the club Dréher in Paris and at Magnetic Terrasse, usually in trio with Alby Cullaz and Christian Vander, but also with Barney Wilen or Jacques Pelzer.

In 1977 saxophonist and flutist Jacques Pelzer, whose daughter Micheline was married to Graillier, introduced him to Chet Baker. For the next ten years, Graillier accompanied Baker.

In addition, he played with Éric Le Lann, Philip Catherine, Jacques Thollot, Richard Raux, Jean-Pierre Debarbat, Alain Jean-Marie, Paolo Fresu, and Pharoah Sanders. He appeared regularly in duo with bassist Riccardo Del Fra and in trio with Alby Cullaz and Simon Goubert.

In the course of his career, he accompanied singers Julos Beaucarne, Jacques Bertin, Maxime le Forestier, Eddy Mitchell, Stéphanie Crawford, Elisabeth Caumont, and Stella Vander.

He died due to complications of a duodenal ulcer in February 2003.

== Style ==
According to Graillier, he was influenced most by pianists Bud Powell, Bill Evans, and McCoy Tyner, and somewhat later Herbie Hancock in the Miles Davis quintet.

But Graillier has also said of his influences, "Of course, the influences are there, but it is not worth talking about them, they are part of the normal evolution of any musician. A musician simply wants to play, regardless of his knowledge of the language. He is therefore obliged to learn the language that others have developed over decades and this language becomes more and more intelligible over time, just as a kid learns to write. Above all, the influence of the great pianists and musicians is mainly of value in showing one how to find one's own voice."

In his short autobiography, Le Monde la Musique (The World and its Music), Graillier cited a phrase from Pascal Anquetil, "There floats through all his music, a dreamy and sweetly drifting mist. A climate of peace that restores one on a summer night without knowing exactly why."

Xavier Prévost wrote in the Dictionnaire du Jazz, "Michel Graillier constructed an internal dialogue of breathing that knew how to make room for silence."

== Awards ==
- Prix Django Reinhardt Prize of the Académie du Jazz, 1978
- Grand Prix de l'Académie Charles Cros, jazz, 1983
- Grand Prix du Disque, 2000
- Prix Boris Vian de l'Académie du Jazz, 2000

== Discography ==
- Pianos Puzzle (Saravah, 1970, 1991)
- Agartha (Saravah, 1970)
- Ad lib (Musica, 1976)
- Libra, (1976)
- In a Spring Way, (1978)
- Toutes ces choses (Open, 1979)
- Dream Drops (Owl, 1981, 1992)
- Oiseaux de nuit with Alain Jean-Marie (Le Chant du Monde, 1991, 2004)
- Fairly – The Complete Session (Le Chant du Monde, 1991, reedited in 2005)
- Fairly (Le Chant du Monde, 1991)
- Portrait in Black and White with Alain Jean-Marie (EmArcy, 1991, 2005)
- Sweet Smile (1996; Sketch, 2006)
- Soft Talk (Sketch, 2000)

With Chet Baker

- Mr. B (Timeless, 1983)
- At Capolinea (Red, 1983 [1987])
- Chet Baker Sings Again (Timeless, 1985)
- Candy (Sonet, 1985)
- Live from the Moonlight (Philology, 1988)
