= Jannick Top =

French bass player and composer

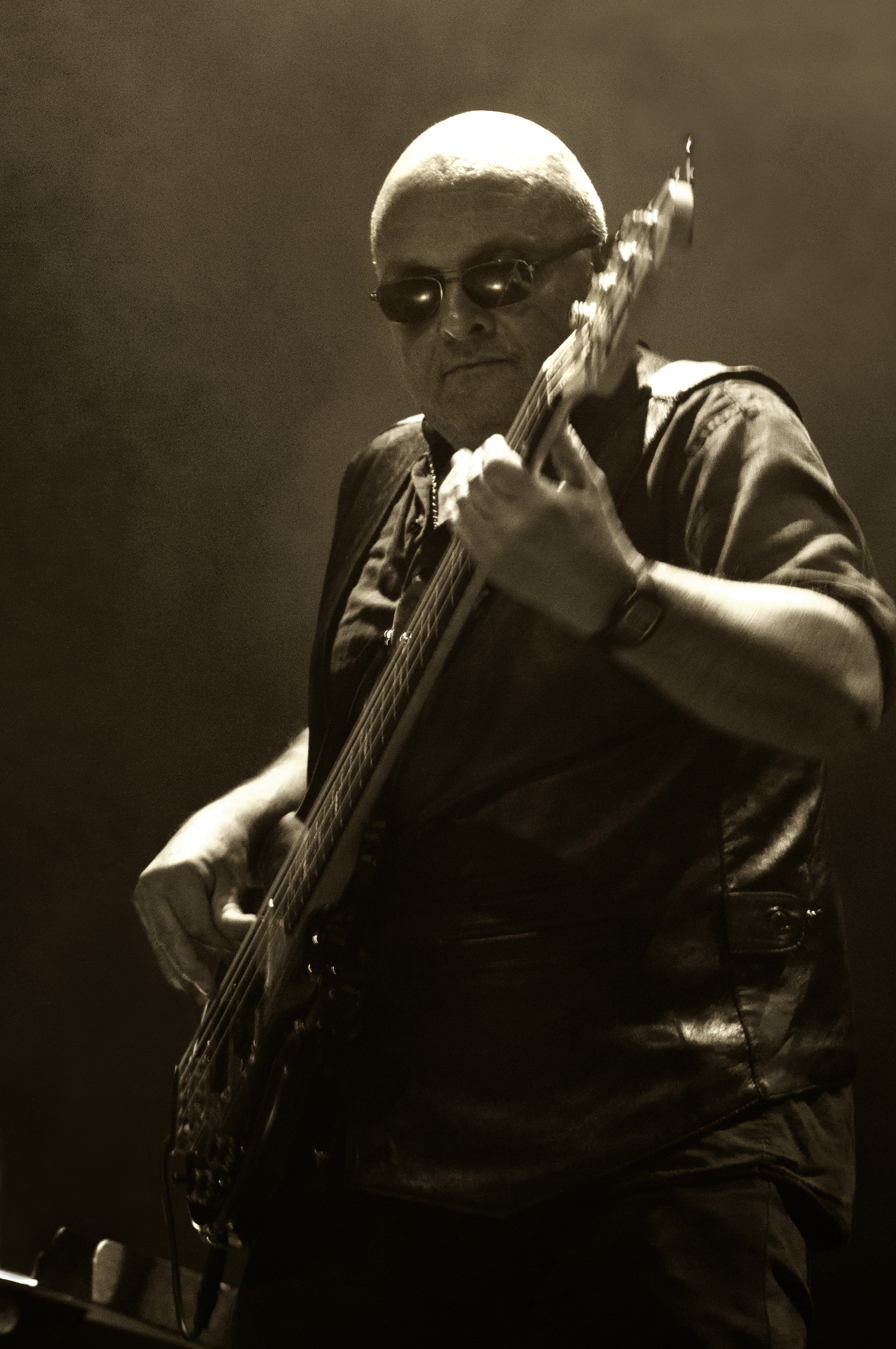
- Top performing in 2011

Background information
- Born: Jannick Top; 4 October 1947 (age 79); Marseille, France
- Genres: Zeuhl; electronic; film score
- Occupation: Musician
- Instrument: Bass
- Formerly of: Magma

Jannick "Janik" Top is a French bass player and composer, born in Marseille. Top plays the electric bass and the cello.

In the 1970s, he was a lead member of the influential zeuhl band Magma, along with Christian Vander and Didier Lockwood. On some Magma albums, he appears under his Kobaïan name: Ẁahrɢ̆enuhr Strääviňskyy Reuɢ̆ehlemᴧësteh. From 1977 to 1980, he played in the popular electronic project Space.

Since then, he has worked with many other musicians, including session work for Michel Berger, France Gall, Richard Cocciante, Bonnie Tyler, Eurythmics, Ray Charles, Céline Dion as well as live playing and musical direction for shows, including Johnny Hallyday and Starmania. In association with Serge Perathoner, keyboardist, he has also done a variety of film and advertisement music.

== See also ==
- Magma
- Mëkanïk Dëstruktïẁ Kömmandöh (1973)
