= Didier Lockwood =

French jazz violinist (1956–2018)

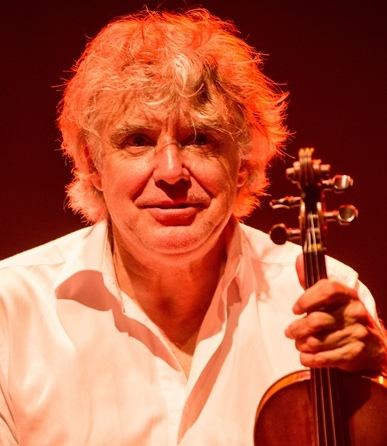
- Didier Lockwood in October 2014

Background information
- Born: 11 February 1956; Calais, France
- Died: 18 February 2018 (aged 62) Paris, France
- Genres: Jazz rock; progressive rock; avant-garde rock; classical rock
- Occupation: Musician
- Instrument: Violin
- Labels: JMS, Gramavision, Dreyfus
- Website: www.didierlockwood.com

Didier Lockwood (11 February 1956 – 18 February 2018) was a French violinist. He played in the French rock band Magma in the 1970s, and was known for his use of electric amplification and his experimentation with different sounds on the electric violin.

== Career ==
In 1979, Lockwood released his first album as a leader, New World, and recorded more than 20 albums. In 1994, he moved to New York City for two years. During that time he recorded two albums, New York Rendez Vous and Storyboard. Lockwood's influences include violinist Jean-Luc Ponty. He started playing electric violin after hearing Ponty on the album King Kong: Jean-Luc Ponty Plays the Music of Frank Zappa. Another important influence was Frenchman Stéphane Grappelli. In 2000, Lockwood recorded a tribute album to Grappelli. Lockwood died of a heart attack at the age of 62 on February 18, 2018, in Paris.

== Discography ==
=== In Magma ===
Lockwood is listed under his Kobaïan name: Stöht Malaẁëlëkaahm.

- Live/Hhaï (1975)
- Retrospetkiẁ III (1981)

=== As leader ===
- Thank You Friends with Francois Cahen (Atlantic, 1978)
- New World (MPS, 1979)
- Surya (Inner City, 1980)
- Live in Montreux (Pausa, 1980)
- Fusion (JMS, 1981)
- Fasten Seat Belts (JMS, 1982)
- Trio (JMS, 1983)
- The Kid (MPS, 1983)
- Out of the Blue (Gramavision, 1985)
- Rhythm & BLU (Gramavision, 1986)
- Absolutely Live (JMS, 1986)
- 1.2.3.4 (JMS, 1987)
- Au Clair de La Lune (JMS, 1989)
- Lune Froide (JMS, 1991)
- Colors (Nuevos Medios, 1991)
- Caron/Ecay/Lockwood (JMS, 1992)
- For Evans Sake (JMS, 1992)
- Solal Lockwood (JMS, 1993)
- Onztet de Violon Jazz (JMS, 1994)
- New York Rendez-Vous (JMS, 1995)
- Storyboard (Dreyfus, 1996)
- Round About Silence (Dreyfus, 1998)
- Omkara (Dreyfus, 2001)
- Globe Trotter (Universal, 2003)
- Les Mouettes (EmArcy, 2005)
- Tribute to Stephane Grappelli (Dreyfus, 2006)
- Le Jazz & La Diva (Ames/Harmonia Mundi 2006)
- Waltz Club (EmArcy, 2006)
- La Reine Soleil (Ames, 2007)
- For Stephane (Ames, 2008)
- Le Jazz & La Diva Opus II (Ames, 2008)
- Brothers (Ames, 2009)
- Apesantar (Fremeaux, 2016)
- Open Doors (Ames/Okeh/Sony, 2017)

== Gallery ==
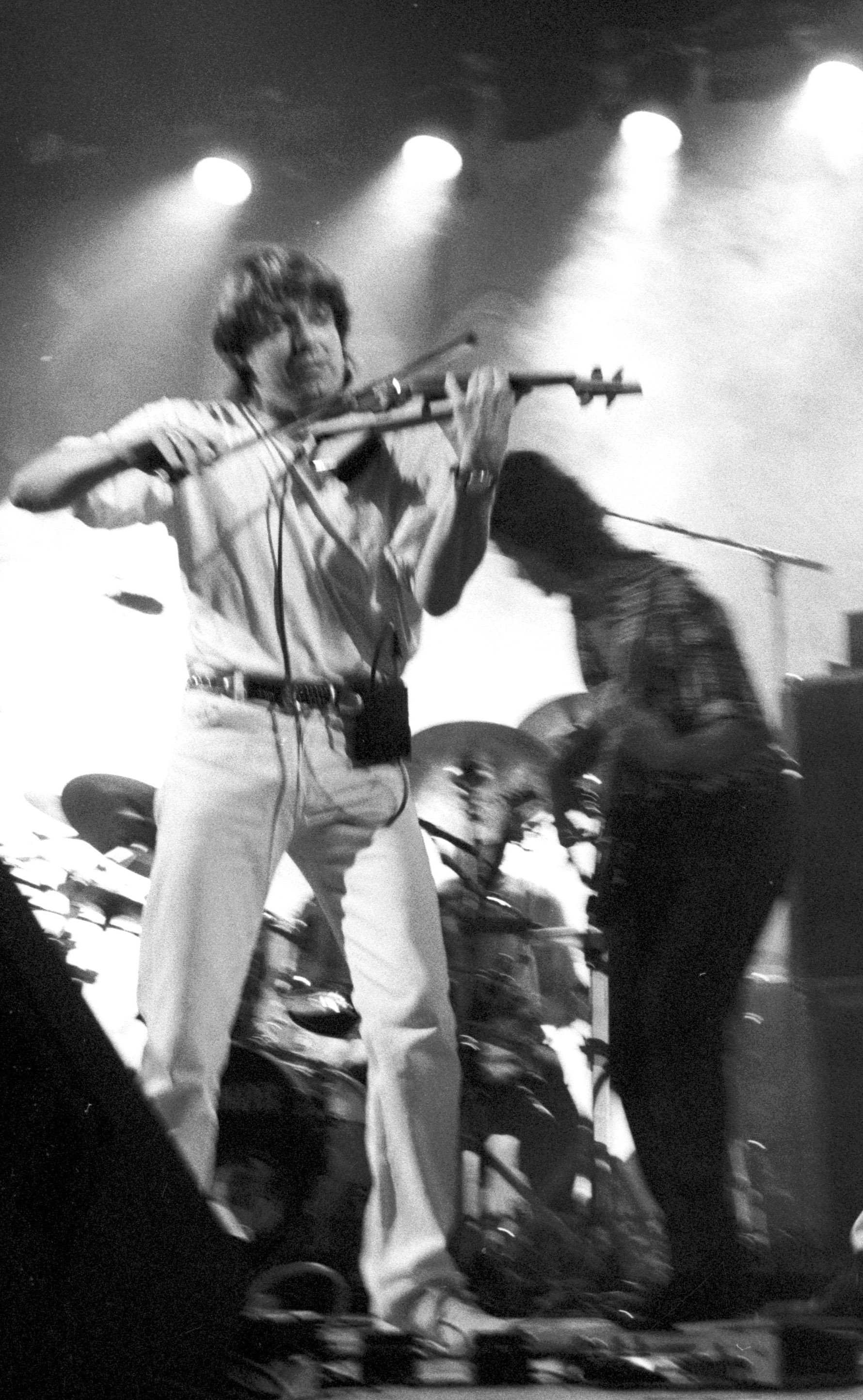
Didier Lockwood in concert (1992)

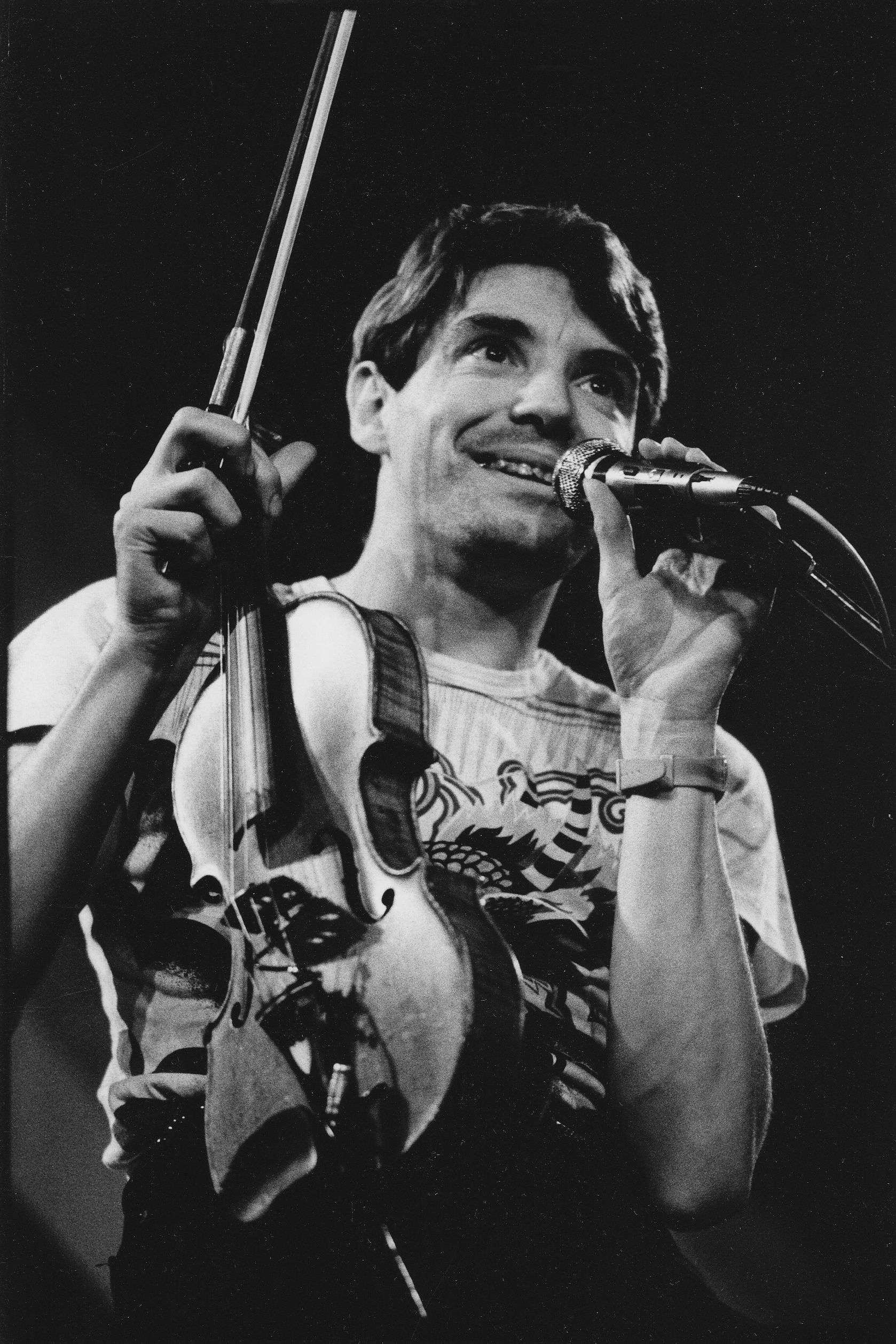
Didier Lockwood in concert, International Jazz Festival Prague, Lucerna Hall, 1984
