= Zeuhl =

Music genre

- Other names: Celestial music
- Stylistic origins: Jazz fusion; symphonic rock; neoclassical
- Cultural origins: Late 1960s - early 1970s France

Zeuhl (pronounced [zœl]; lit. 'celestial') is a music genre that is a hybrid of jazz fusion, symphonic rock and neoclassical music, established in 1969 by the French band Magma. The term comes from Kobaïan, the fictional language created by Magma's Christian Vander and Klaus Blasquiz for Magma, in which Zeuhl Ẁortz means approximately 'celestial force'.

== Characteristics ==
The musical roots of zeuhl go back to pioneers of the free jazz movement such as John Coltrane and folkloristic echoes and influences from Carl Orff's work.

Zeuhl is determined by several characteristic elements. Especially important are dominant rhythm fractions, usually in the form of a pumping bass guitar and sometimes sluggish or flexibly playing drum kits. Slow repetitive structures that serve to build a hypnotic atmosphere are just as prominent as solo passages of high technical finesse. Vocals are often widely present and can consist of polyphonic choral movements, such as Carl Orff's Carmina Burana, or soloistically performed passages with shrill intonation. Zeuhl bands also often have solo guitarists or pianists that usually have a more than accompanying function, especially to emphasize the repetitive patterns.

Dominique Leone, writing for Pitchfork, says the style is "about what you'd expect an alien rock opera to sound like: massed, chanted choral motifs, martial, repetitive percussion, sudden bursts of explosive improv and just as unexpected lapses into eerie, minimalist trance-rock." Christian Vander has said that it means celestial and that "Zeuhl music means vibratory music" and that zeuhl is "L'esprit au travers de la matière" (The spirit through matter). "That is Zeuhl. Zeuhl is also the sound which you can feel vibrating in your belly. Pronounce the word Zeuhl very slowly, and stress the letter z at the beginning, and you will feel your body vibrating."

== Reception ==
Originally applied solely to the music of Magma, the term "zeuhl" was eventually used to describe the similar music produced by French bands beginning in the 1970s. In addition to Magma, bands who are associated with the term include: Happy Family, Kōenji Hyakkei, and Ruins from Japan, and French band Zao.

== Literature ==
- Holm-Hudson, Kevin (2003). "Apocalyptic Otherness: Black Music and Extraterrestrial Identity in the Music of Magma". Popular Music and Society. 26 (4). Abingdon: Routledge: 481–495. doi:10.1080/0300776032000144931. ISSN 0300-7766. S2CID 194078761.
