= Stella Vander =

French singer and musician (born 1950)

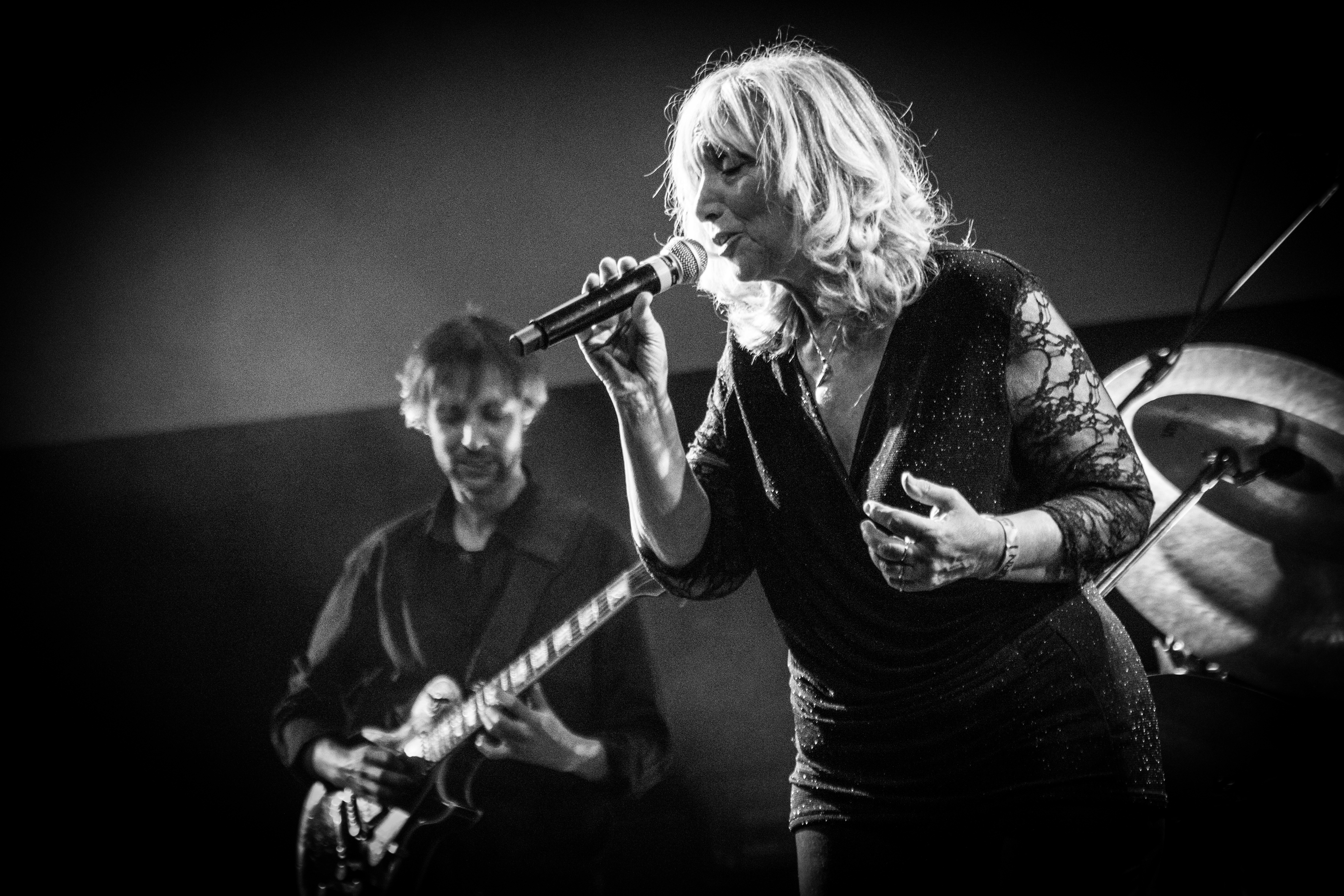
- Stella Vander live with Magma at Roadburn Festival 2017

Background information
- Also known as: Stella, Tauhd Zaïna
- Born: Stella Zelcer; 12 December 1950 (age 75); Paris, France
- Occupations: singer, musician
- Years active: 1963–present
- Member of: Magma

Stella Vander (born Stella Zelcer, also known as Stella; 12 December 1950) is a French singer, musician and record producer.

== Early years ==
Born in Paris into a family of Polish immigrants, she began writing music in the early sixties together with her uncle Maurice Chorenslup. Their songs were parodies of the Yé-yé style that was popular at the time. Stella's first EP, which included "Pourquoi pas moi", was released in November 1963, when she was twelve. In 1966, "Un air du folklore Auvergnat" ("a folk song from Auvergne", mocking Sheila's "Le Folklore Américain") increased her fame, followed by protests by the Auvergnat association—which took the lyrics seriously. Her take on music was "engagingly sarcastic". 1966's Beatnicks D'Occasion targeted weekend scenesters. Her final record as Stella was released in 1967. "I wasn't even 17 yet, but I just said 'Ok, pfft. Leave it.'"

== Magma ==
She married Magma drummer Christian Vander and has appeared on numerous Magma albums. During the band's hiatus, she divorced Christian and married Francis Linon, the band's sound engineer. Both founded the record label Seventh Records in 1987 for an independent promotion of Magma's work. The couple started Seventh Records to organise Magma's work and to release some of Christian Vander's personal works. Since Magma's reformation in the late 1990s, she has assumed a larger role in the band's studio and performance efforts, and is currently Magma's most enduring and prominent vocalist. On many Magma albums, she appears under her Kobaïan name: Thaud Zaïa.

== Solo albums ==
In 1991 she released her first solo album as Stella Vander, D'épreuves d'amour (Seventh A-VIII). Le coeur allant vers (Ex-Tension, with Sophia Domancich) appeared in 2004. In 2011 Passage du Nord Ouest (Seventh AKT XVII 2 CD) was released (recorded in Paris, 29/12/1991). Pourquoi pas moi, a compilation of 40 tracks from the years 1963–1968, was released in 1997 (Magic records 2 CD).
