= Christian Vander (musician) =

French musician (born 1948)

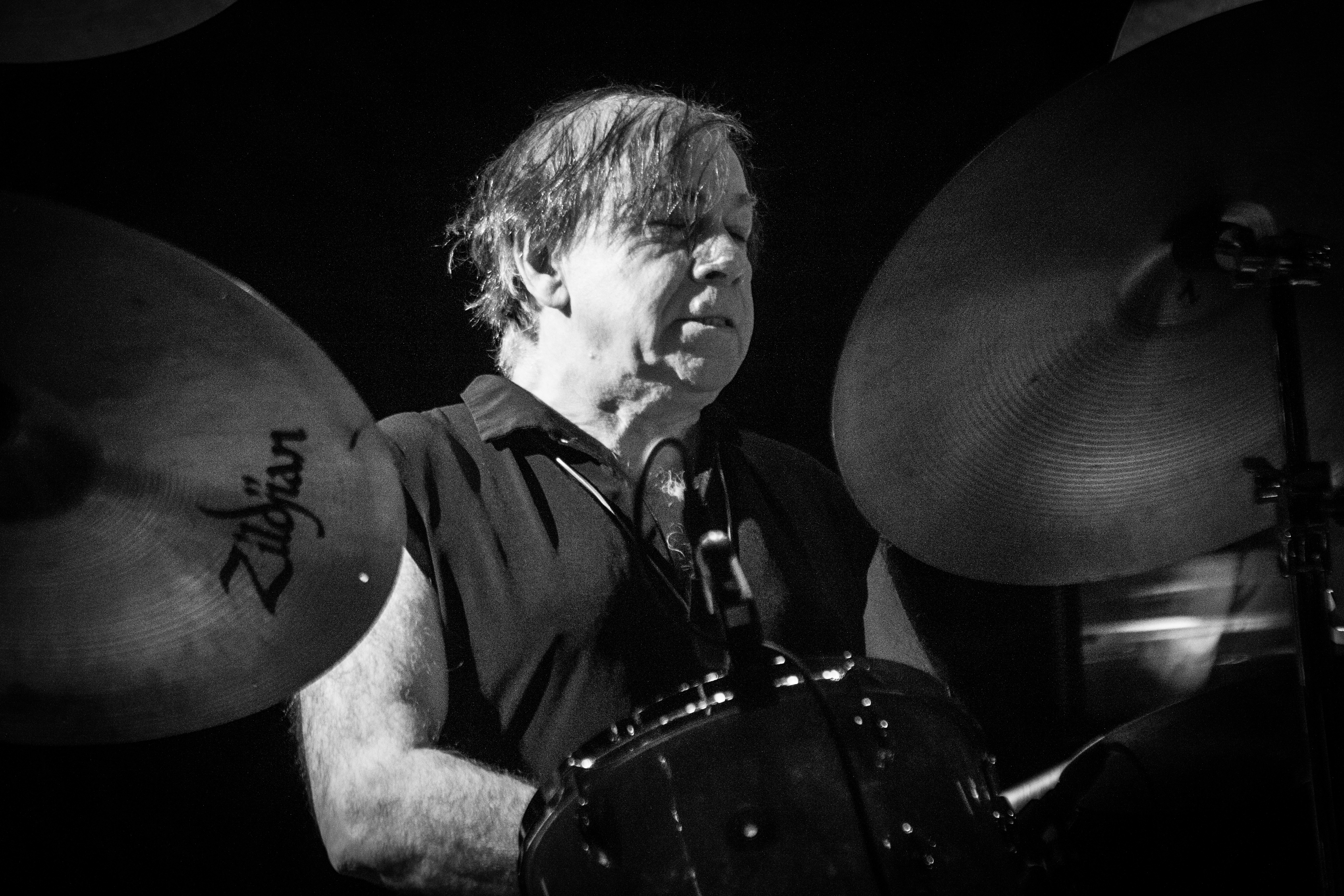
- Vander at the 2017 Roadburn Festival

Background information
- Born: 21 February 1948 (age 78); Nogent-sur-Marne, Val-de-Marne, France
- Genres: Zeuhl; progressive rock
- Occupations: Musician; composer
- Instruments: Drums; vocals; piano
- Member of: Magma

Christian Vander (born 21 February 1948) is a French drummer, composer, singer and founder of the progressive rock band Magma.

== Career ==
Vander is known for his extended compositions, drumming, and shrill falsetto improvisational/scat singing. His music fuses jazz, rock, classical and operatic influences, and draws on the work of musicians as diverse as John Coltrane and Carl Orff.

Vander regards Coltrane as his greatest musical inspiration, and dedicated his 2011 album John Coltrane L'Homme Suprême to him as a tribute.

== Personal life ==
Christian Vander is the adopted child of famous French jazz piano player Maurice Vander (who was a long time sideman of singer Claude Nougaro). Most of Vander and Magma's recorded work is still available through Vander's own record label, Seventh Records.

He was married to singer Stella Vander who released many EPs herself in the 1960s and has performed vocal duties for Magma since 1972. They divorced in the 1980s, with speculations that this occurred in the hiatus years. Christian and Stella have a daughter, Julie, who has appeared on several Magma and Offering releases. Vander often appears on Magma albums under his Kobaïan name: Zebëhn Straïn dë Ğeuštaah.

== See also ==
- Romantic Warriors II: A Progressive Music Saga About Rock in Opposition
- Romantic Warriors II: Special Features DVD
