= Mark Hansen =

Mark Hansen may refer to:

- Mark Henry Hansen, American statistician and data journalist
- Mark Victor Hansen (born 1948), American author and motivational speaker
- Mark Hansen, a suspect in the Black Dahlia murder
- Mark B. N. Hansen (born 1965), American media theorist and literary scholar

== See also ==
- Marc Hansen (disambiguation)
- Mark Hanson (disambiguation)
