= Thomas Latham =

Thomas or Tom Latham may refer to:

- Tom Latham (politician) (born 1948), United States politician
- Tom Latham (cricketer) (born 1992), New Zealand cricketer
- Thomas Latham (cricketer) (1847–1926), English barrister and cricketer
- Thomas Latham (MP) for Westminster (UK Parliament constituency) in 1654
- Thomas J. Latham (1831–1911), American lawyer and businessman
