= Oliver Grau =

German art historian (born 1965)

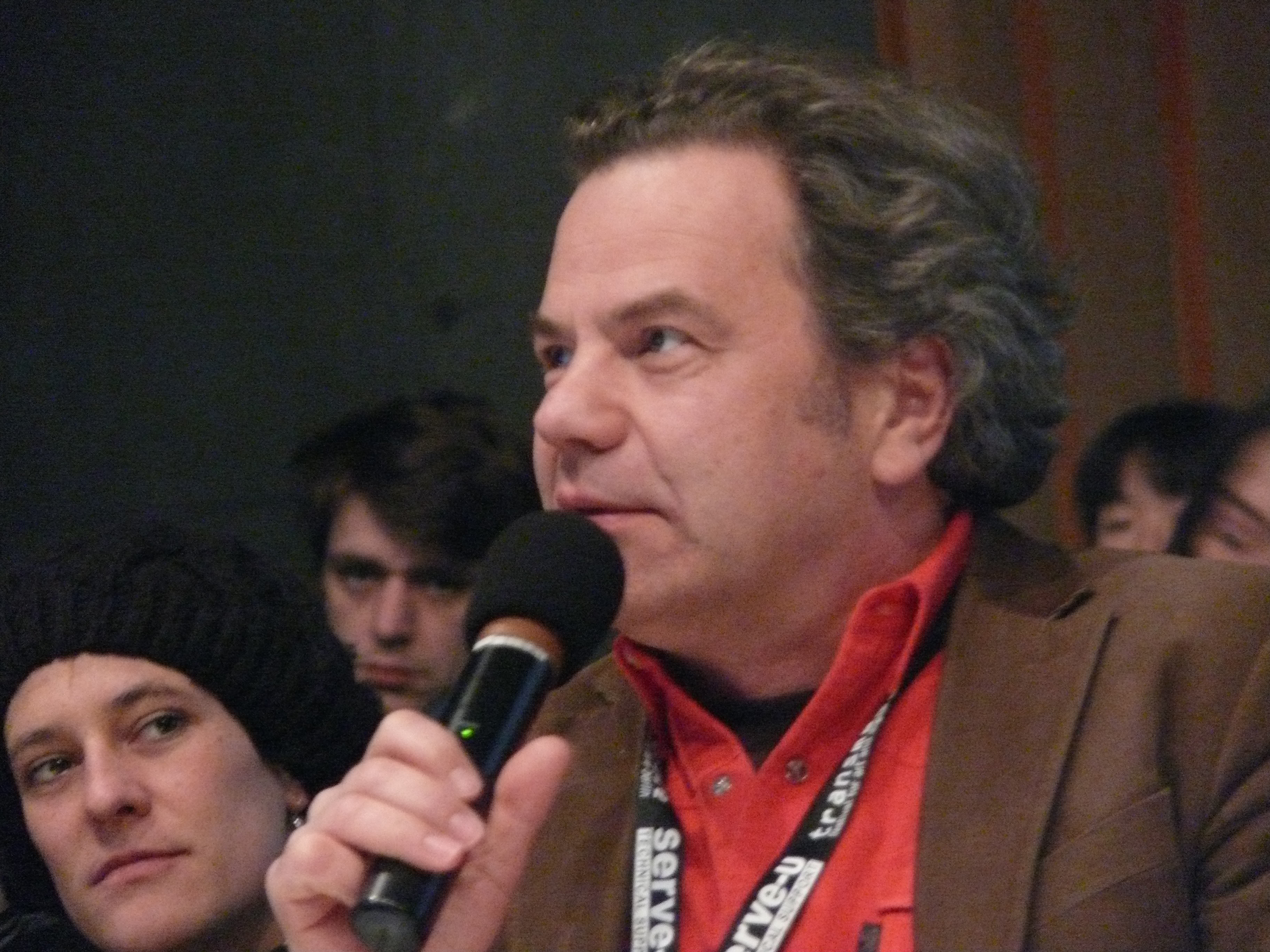
Grau in transmediale 2010.

Oliver Grau (born 24 October 1965) is a German art historian and media theoretician who focuses on image science, modernity and media art as well as culture of the 19th century and Italian art of the Renaissance. His main areas of research are Digital Art, Media Art History, Immersion (virtual reality), digital humanities, documentation and conservation strategies of born-digital art. Grau is founder and director of the Archive for Digital Art (founded in 1998) and founder and is head of the Society for MediaArtHistories and its biennial conference series, active since 2004. His monograph Virtual Art: From Illusion to Immersion (MIT Press 2004) is often cited and with translations of his texts in 15 languages to date and over 300 invited lectures in 44 countries, he is one of the most internationally renowned contemporary art and media scholars. Oliver Grau was appointed in 2005 Chair Professor at the Center for Image Science (which investigates the ways that image quality can be defined, measured and optimized) at the Danube University Krems.

== Works ==
He was invited to more than 350 lectures and keynotes and has conducted international lecture tours, received numerous awards, and produced international publications in English, Spanish, Portuguese, Serbian, Macedonian, Slovenian, Korean, Chinese. After studying in Hamburg, Siena, and London, earning a master's degree under Martin Warnke, among others, and a doctorate in Berlin under Horst Bredekamp and Friedrich Kittler, Grau taught and conducted research at the Humboldt University in Berlin, spent time as a guest researcher at institutions in Japan and the United States, and, after completing his degree at the University of Art and Design Linz in 2004, worked as a professor at various universities. Since 2005 he has held the first chair for image sciences in the German-speaking world and headed the Department of Image Science at Danube University Krems. His main research interests in image science focus on the histories of media art, immersion (virtual reality), and emotion, as well as the history, idea, and culture of artificial life, "living" and telematic imagery, telepresence and the development of digital humanities through tools such as online image and video databases.

=== Immersion research ===
Grau's book Virtual Art has more than 2700 citations according to Grau's Google Scholar profile and has received more than 80 reviews.

Using an interdisciplinary approach Grau also analysed methods which elicit or heighten the impression of immersion in digital image spaces for the viewer. He found that this is primarily induced by interaction; reaction of the images in real-time to the viewer's movements (Grau 1999–2007), the utilisation of evolutionary image processes — for example, genetic algorithms — (Grau 1997 and 2001), haptic feedback, the natural design of the interface (Grau 2002), the impression of telematic presence (Grau 2000), and particularly the dimensions and design of the image display, which must fill the viewer's field of vision completely and extend up to 360° both horizontally and vertically (Grau 2001 and 2003). These studies sought to transcend customary single media approaches in research on perceptual illusions and to introduce concepts such as polysensuality, suggestive potential, image space, disposition of the individual observer, and evolution of the visual media as well as to expand the theoretical work on distance by Ernst Cassirer and Erwin Panofsky, amongst others. In addition Grau undertook studies of innovative linkages of architecture and immersive moving images (Grau 2003, etc.), as well as of immersion in the history of film (Grau 2006 and 2007). The majority of these publications resulted from two research projects of the Deutsche Forschungsgemeinschaft (DFG — German Research Foundation): Art History and Media Theories of Virtual Reality, 1998–2002, and Immersive Art, 2002–2005.

=== Emotion research ===
Several research projects conducted at the Berlin-Brandenburg Academy of Sciences and Humanities and the German Academy of Sciences Leopoldina and two summer academies supported by the Volkswagen Foundation gave rise to an interdisciplinary study on the history of managing feelings through images and sound (Grau 2005). Building on the work of Antonio Damasio, Joseph LeDoux, and Wolf Singer, and using the examples of Matthias Grünewald's Isenheim Altarpiece, Leni Riefenstahl's film Triumph of the Will, and the computer game America's Army, it was demonstrated how emotional experiences with images can forge a sense of community.

=== Media Art Histories and Image Science ===
Since 2002, Grau brought together interdisciplinary media art research and its history(s) as in an international and interdisciplinary conference series. A year of scholarly research 2003 by Oliver Grau and Wendy Coones at Humboldt University Berlin and the presentation and discussion of the concept at a DFG-funded planning meeting led by Grau with international experts at the Villa Vigoni Science Center in 2004, led to the first congress on media art history in Banff (Canada) in 2005 under Grau's directorship, with 500 participants. Through the world conferences in Berlin (2007), Melbourne (2009), Liverpool (2011), Riga (2013), Montreal (2015), 2017 Krems/Vienna (2017), Aalborg (2019), Venice (2023) Grau, as founding director and chair with the members of the boards, was able to establish the international field, which draws especially from art, media, film, technology, and science history, and includes digital humanities, sound studies, anthropology, and philosophy. His volumes "Imagery in the 21st Century" (2011), "Museum and Archive on the Move" (2017), "Digital Art through the Looking Glass" (2019) and "Retracing Political Dimensions: Strategies in Contemporary New Media Art" (2021) expanded the context of Image Science.

In 2018 Grau was a speaker at the Chicago New Media Symposium which was held as part of the Chicago New Media 1973-1992 Exhibition. The Exhibition was curated by jonCates.

== Awards and distinctions ==
Awards among other things: 2001 voted into Young Academy of the Berlin-Brandenburg Academy of Sciences and Humanities and the Leopoldina; 2002 InterNations/Goethe Institute; 2003 Book of the Month, Scientific American; 2003 Research Scholarship from the German-Italian Center Villa Vigoni; 2004 Media Award of the Humboldt University Society. 2008 he was invited to the official cultural program of the XXIX Olympic Summer Games in Beijing, 2010 to lecture at G-20 summit/“tech+ forum by Ministry of Knowledge Economy of the Republic of Korea and 2011 for the opening lecture of the international Dongkuk Humanities Series for Nobel Prize laureates at POSTECH. 2014 he received an honorary doctorate and in 2015 he was elected into the Academia Europaea. In Nov. 2016, the Open Univ. of Israel hosted an honorary symposium on Oliver Grau's research; in 2019, Grau received the Science Award of the State of Lower Austria.

== Writings (Monographs) ==
- Virtuelle Kunst in Geschichte und Gegenwart: Visuelle Strategien. Reimer, Berlin 2001. [Rezension: Frankfurter Allgemeine Zeitung, Barbara Basting: Schachmatt durch die Simulatorkrankheit: Eine Schlüsselstudie: Oliver Graus kunsthistorische Erschließung der neuen virtuellen Räume, Nov. 19, 2001, S. 48.; Deutschlandfunk, Bettina Mittelstrass: Distanz und Virtuelle Räume, 21 min., June 27, 2002; Deutschlandfunk, Rainer B. Schossig: Immersive Bilder - Digitale Bilder heute: Was ist ein Bild? “ Kultur am Sonntag Vormittag, 30 min., Sept. 15, 2002; Ludwig Seyfarth: Oliver Graus (Vor)geschichte der virtuellen Realität, in: FAZ.NET, Swen Oliver Lohmann: Computerbilder wurzeln in der Antike, in: TAGESSPIEGEL, 12.10.2001, S. B3.; Journal für Kunstgeschichte, Anne Hoormann: Eine „Subgeschichte der Kunstgeschichte“, Vol. 2, 2002, pp. 182–187.]
- Virtual Art: From Illusion to Immersion (MIT Press/Leonardo Book Series, 2003)(China 2006, Serbia 2008, Brazil 2009). Review by Alison Abbott in Nature 427, page 17 (2004): Art that draws you in; Scientific American, Virtual Art: Book of the Month, Aug. 2003; Art Monthly, Michael Gibbs, Virtual Art, Mar. 2003; European Photography, Guy van Belle: Oliver Grau: Virtual Art, Issue 73/74, Vol. 24, 2003, pp. 104–105.; Amy Ione: Virtual Art: From Illusion to Immersion, in: Leonardo Reviews, _archive/feb2003/GRAU_ione.html; Italy: Anna Maria Monteverdi: Esperienze artificiali multisensoriali, Recensione a Oliver Grau, Virtual Art. From illusion to immersion, in: Teatro e Nuovi Media, No. 52, 2003 and in: ateatro, 11.11.2009; France: Cahiers du MNAM, Éditions du Centre Georges Pompidou, Jean Da Silva: Notes de lecture, Stephen Wilson: 'Information Arts'/Oliver Grau: 'Virtual Art', No. 87, Spring 2004, Sweden: Konstperspektiv, Mathias Jansson: Bokrecensioner - 'Virtual Art', July 2003; Netherlands: Optische Fenomen, Nederlandse Stichting voor Waarneming & Holografie, Jan M. Broeders, issue 187, Jan. 2003, p. 5.; John Boardmann: Review Virtual Art: From Illusion to Immersion, in: COMMON KNOWLEDGE, Volume 9, Issue 3, Fall 2003, pp. 544 – 544; Art Papers, Barbara L. Miller: Re-evaluating Virtual Representation. Two books ask what makes new media new, May 2004; Consciousness, Literature and the Arts, Roger Dawkins: Review 'Virtual Art', vol 4, No 3, Dec. 2003; Fine Art Forum - Ezine, Teri Hoskin: Review 'Virtual Art', vol. 17, No. 11, Nov. 2003; Anthony Enns: A Review of: Friedrich Kittler, Optische Medien: Berliner Vorlesung and Oliver Grau, Virtual Art: From Illusion to Immersion, electronic book review, 13.03.2004; Intelligent Agent - Online Magazine, Patrick Lichty: Review 'Virtual Art', vol 3 No 2, Summer/ Fall 2003; Christiane Lenhardt: Das Faszinosum der künstlichen Welt, in: Badisches Tagblatt, May 3, 2005; Alejandra Correa: Derecho de Admisión, Virtual e Immersivo (Interview), in: Funámbulos Summer 2005, pp. 39–42; UK: Pugh, E., in Digital Creativity, 2004, Vol 15, no 2; p. 126-128, Bryan-Wilson, J. in: Technology and Culture, 2004, Vol 45, no. 3, p. 670-671; Taiwan: Art & Collection, Taipei, The Aura of the Digital, Interview, May 2004, pp. 106–111; Estland: Arvuti Maailm, Raivo Kelomees: Immersiivne Kunst, June 23, 2004; Schweden: Svenska Dagbladet, Karl Steinik: Panoramat i den virtuella konsten, June 23, 2004, Argentinien: Florencia Rodriguez: Todo Lo Sólido Se Desvanece En La Illusion. Oliver Grau En Buenos Aires, in: summa+ 75, 2005, pp. 146–7; Spanien: Lucia Santaella: Virtual Art, Rezension, in: DeSignis 7 (Barcelona) 2006, Brasil: Silvia Boone: Arte Virtual: da Illusao a Imersao – Oliver Grau, in: Porto Arte: Revista de Artes Visuais, 2009; Serbia: Мapинa Byлиђeвиђ: Урaњaњe y bиrtyeлнo, in: Politika, 09.06.2010, p. 14; В. К. – Танјуг: Оливер Грау представио своју књигу „Виртуелна уметност“, in: www.godinaknjigeijzika.rs, vom 06.06.10; Jelena Guga: Nova estetika uranjajucih prostora slike, in: Nova Misao - Časopis za savremenu kulturu Vojvodine, no. 6 / June 2010, p. 46 – 48; Laura Palmer: A Review of Virtual Art: From Illusion to Immersion, in: A Review of Virtual Art: From Illusion to Immersion;
- Bildwerdung. Habilitationsschrift. Kunstuniversität, Linz 2004.
- Эмоции и иммерсия: ключевые элементы визуальных исследований / Пер. с нем. А. М. Гайсина, EDIOS Publishing House, St. Petersburg 2013.
- On the Visual Power of Digital Arts. For a New Archive and Museum Infrastructure in the 21st Century, Editiones de la Universitad de Castilia-La-Mancha, 2016.

== Writings (Edited Volumes) ==
- Retracing Political Dimensions: Strategies in Contemporary New Media Art, Berlin/Boston: De Gruyter 2021. ISBN 978-3-11-067094-3 PDF-ISBN 978-3-11-067098-1. [Review by Brian Reffin Smith: Retracing Political Dimensions: Strategies in Contemporary New Media Art, in Leonardo Reviews 2/2021, Retracing Political Dimensions: Strategies in Contemporary New Media Art]
- Digital Art through the Looking Glass: New strategies for archiving, collecting and preserving in Digital Humanities, Krems/Wien/Hamburg: Danube University Press 2019. ISBN 9783903150515 [Rezension von Bruce Sterling, in WIRED Digital Art through the Looking Glass: New strategies for archiving, collecting and preserving in Digital Humanities]
- Museum and Archive on the Move: Changing cultural Institutions in the digital Era. Munich: DeGruyter 2017. With Contributions by Lev Manovich, Okwui Envezor, Christiane Paul, Dieter Bogner, Jeffrey Shaw, Sarah Kenderdine et al. [Review by Gabriela Galati, Leonardo. The International Society for the Arts, Sciences and Technology, December 2018, Review of Museum and Archive on the Move: Changing Cultural Institutions in the Digital Era] [Review by Danielle O'Donovan and Tom Lonergan, Museum International [ICOM's peer-reviewed journal], Vol. 70, No. 277–278, 2018, p. 176–177 ] DOI: Museum and Archive on the Move: Changing Cultural Institutions in the Digital Era
- Imagery in the 21st Century. Cambridge, MA: MIT-Press 2011. ISBN 9780262015721. With contributions by James Elkins, Eduardo Kac, Peter Weibel, Lev Manovich, Olaf Breitbach, Martin Kemp, Sean Cubitt, Christa Sommerer, Marie Luise Angerer, Wendy Chun u. a. [Reviews: from Art History: Pamela C. Scorzin: Review: Oliver Grau (Hg.) Imagery in the 21st Century, in: Journal für Kunstgeschichte 15, 2011, Heft 4, S. 278–281; media studies: Mattias Kuzina in: Medienwissenschaft 2/2012, S. 178 Imagery in the 21st Century (Bookreview); It's Liquid; 163. Harald Klinke: Rezension von Imagery in the 21st century, VI, 410, (16) S. III 2013, in: Kunstform, 14. 2013, 6; Brasil: Cleomar Rocha u. Vanderlei Veget Lopes Junior, Imagens no seculo XXI: panorama, perspectivas e prospeccoes, in VISUALIDADES, Goiania v.9 n2 p. 213-217, jul-dez. 2011; Serbia: Jelena Guga: Silkovnost u 21.veku, in: NOVA MISAO – casopis za savremenu Vojvodine, br. 17 April/Mai 2012]
- MediaArtHistories, Cambridge: MIT Press 2007. * MediaArtHistories (MIT Press/Leonardo Book Series, 2007). ISBN 978-0262514989 (Translations in Brazil, Macedonie etc.). [Reviews: Germany: Christoph Klütsch: MediaArtHistories, in: kunsttexte.de, 1.07.2007; USA: Robert Atkins: Channeling New Media, in: Art in America, Dezember 2008, p. 47 – 50; Serbien: Matko Mestreovic: Kako razumjeti medijsku umjetnost, in: Zarez IX/208, 14. lipnja 2007, p. 8f.; Australia: Daniel Palmer: Walter Benjamin and the Virtual: Politics, Art, and Mediation in the Age of Global Culture, in: TRANSFORMATIONS, Issue No. 15, November 2007; Poland: Mariusz Pisarski: Historie sztuki mediów, in: TECHSTY, Literatura i Nouva Media, 7.7.2007; Brasil: Sergio Kulpas: histórias da artemídia, in: Encyclopédia Itaú Cultural: arte e tecnologia, August 2007; Großbritannien: Charlie Gere: MediaArtHistories, in: The Art Book, Volume 15, Issue 1, S. 51–52; Austria: Eric Kluitenberg: MediaArtHistories, in: Springerin: Hefte für Gegenwartskunst, Vol. XIII, No. 3, 2007, p. 74.; Uruguay: Angel Kalenberg: Between Chaos and Cosmos, Rezension MediaArtHistories, in: Relaciones, Nr. 286, March 2008, p. 26–27; Latvia: Renata Sukaityte: Mediju menas kaip moksline-eksperimentine erdve, in: Menotyra, 2008, T. 15. No. 2, p. 50–61; France: Jens Hauser: MediaArtHistories: Eine andere Kunstgeschichte, ARTE.tv, Februar/2007; media studies: Malte Hagener: Rezension von: Oliver Grau (Ed.), MediaArtHistories, MIT, Cambridge, MA-London 2007, in: Cinéma & Cie, no. 9, Fall 2007; image science: Martin Schulz: Rezension von: Oliver Grau: MediaArtHistories, Cambridge, Mass.: MIT Press 2007, in Kunstform 9 (2008), no.09]
- Mediale Emotionen. Zur Lenkung von Gefühlen durch Bild und Sound, (mit Andreas Keil): Frankfurt/Main: Fischer 2005. ISBN 9783596169177; [Review a.o. Manuela Lenzen, Frankfurter Allgemeine Zeitung: Wie Bild und Klang uns bewegen, 21.11.2005, p. 38. ]

== Published databases ==
- Archive of Digital Art, (ADA), formerly Database of Virtual Art since 1999, approx. 6,500 artists were evaluated, gatekeeping criterion is at least 5 exhibitions and/or 5 scientific articles. More than 3500 works were reviewed. The research-oriented, complex overview of immersive, interactive, telematic and genetic art has been developed in cooperation with renowned media artists, researchers, and institutions. As one of the richest resources online, with an implemented scientific Thesaurus the database responds to demands of the field. Since 2014 ADA has regularly published the complete oeuvre of media artists: Victor ACEVEDO (2022), Oeuvre Complète, Suzanne Anker (2021), Oeuvre Complète, Claudia ROBLES ANGEL (2021), Oeuvre Complète, Bill Seaman (2021), Uršula Berlot (2020), Banz & Bowinkel (2020), Andres Burbano (2019), Maurice Benayoun, Oeuvre Complète (2019), Marta de Menezes, Retrospective, Oeuvre Complète (2017), Chris Salter. Retrospective, (2017), Jody Zellen (2016), Simon Biggs (2016), Olga Kisseleva Retrospective (2016), Tamiko Thiel (2015), Lev Manovich. Works & Texts (2015), Giselle Beigelman. Retrospective (2015), Jeffrey Shaw. Oeuvre Complète (2015), Tamas Waliczky, Retrospective (2015), Warren Neidich. Retrospective (2015), Sean Cubitt, scholar feature (2015), Ryzsard Kluszcynski, scholar feature (2015), Denisa Kera, scholar feature (2015), Seiko Mikami Oeuvre Complète (2015), Paolo Cirio Retrospective (2015), Scenoscome Retrospective (2014).
- Media Art Histories www.MediaArtHistories.org, since 2005. MediaArtHistoryArchive is a text repository evolving into a documentation platform of the conferences on the Histories of Media Art, Science, and Technology. It will develop further into a scholarly archive of the multi-facetted field of MediaArtHistories, which ranges from Art History to Media, Film, Cultural Studies, Computer Science, Psychology, etc.
- The Print Collection of Göttweig Monastery www.gssg.at, since 2007, containing 32.000 original prints from Renaissance to Baroque up to the present, from Durer to Klimt, allows in-depth research into its large resources. This resource serves as an open archive contextualizing historic artistic media art in art and image history. The digitization serves the dissemination of the collection in high resolution form (up to 72 million pixels) and is based on cooperation with Prof. Dr. Gregor Martin Lechner, custodian of the collection.
- Danube Telelectures – www.donau-uni.ac.at/telelectures 2006-08 Live-streamed lecture series held at the Modern Art Museum in Vienna with a live and international online interactive audience. The mix of two live cameras innovatively echoed the studio character, seeking a virtual intimacy with the lecturers and their audience. The lecture series is archived online and stands as a foreshadowing of media like YouTube and UStream.

== Selected publications ==
- Revealing Higher Impact of Media Art Archiving (with Alexander Wöran a.o.), in: ISEA2022 Barcelona, https://doi.org/10.7238/ISEA2022, Proceedings, S. 2012.
- Interconnecting Archives: Paving a Path Forward, (with Bonnie Mitchell a.o.), in: ISEA2022 Barcelona, https://doi.org/10.7238/ISEA2022, Proceedings, S. 2015-18.
- Digital Art’s Political Impact: Time for Hard Humanities!, in: Oliver Grau und Inge Hinterwaldner (Hrsg.): Retracing Political Dimensions: Strategies in Contemporary New Media Art, De Gruyter, Berlin, New York 2021, 34–53.
- Documenting Media Art: A Web 2.0-Archive and Bridging Thesaurus for MediaArtHistories. in: Leonardo Journal, Vol. 52, No. 5, 2019.
- Resisting a Total Loss of Digital Heritage Web 2.0-archiving & bridging thesaurus for media art. In: Oliver Grau und Eveline Wandl-Vogt u. a., Digital Art through the Looking Glas New strategies for archiving, collecting and preserving in Digital Humanities, Krems an der Donau 2019, 193–204.
- Digital Art's Complex Expression and Its Impact on Archives and Humanities: For a Concerted Museum Network of Expertise and Preservation. In Oliver Grau, Wendy Coones, Viola Rühse (eds.) Museum and Archive on the Move: Changing Cultural Institutions in the Digital Era, Berlin: De Gruyter 2017, 99–117.
- Alguma vez nos vamos habituar à imersão? Histórias da Arte dos Media & Ciência da Imagem - Will we ever become used to Immersion? Media Art Histories & Image Science. In Victor Flores (ed.) A terceira Imagem - A Fotografia Estereoscópica em Lissabon: Documenta Portugal, 39–62.
- The Complex and Multifarious Expression of Digital Art & Its Impact on Archives and Humanities. In A Companion to Digital Art, edited by Christiane Paul. New York: Wiley-Blackwell, 2016, 23–45.
- New Media Art. In Oxford Bibliographies in Art History, edited by Prof. Thomas DaCosta Kaufmann. New York: Oxford University Press 2016, 1–18.
- Our Digital Culture threatened by Loss, in: Valentino Catricalà: Media Art: Towards a new definition of Arts in the Age of Technology, Pistoia 2015, pp. 39–44.
- ARCHIVE 2.0: Media Arts Impact and the Need for (Digital) Humanities, in: Giselle Beiguelman (Ed.): (itaú cultural), São Paulo 2014, p. 97-118.
- Druckgrafik bis Medienkunst: Neue Analyseinstrumente für die historisch vergleichende Bildforschung. in: Rundbrief Fotografie, Vol. 21 (2014), No. 1/2 [N.F. 81/82], S. 108–116.
- Our Digital Culture Threatened by Loss, in: The World Financial Review, 2014, pp. 40–42.
- New Perspectives for the (Digital) Humanities, in: The Challenge of the Object, Congress Proceedings of the 33rd Congress of the International Committee of the History of Art. T. 1–3. Ed. by G. Ulrich Großmann/Petra Krutisch, Nuremberg 2013, pp. 990–994.
- "Pamiętajcie fantasmagorię! Osiemnastowieczna polityka iluzji i jej multimedialne życie po życiu", transl. Joanna Walewska, in: Sztuka i filozofia (“Art and Philosophy”), University of Warsaw, 41/2012, pp. 24–39.
- Image Science & MediaArtHistories. New Infrastructures for 21st Century. in: Gunther Friesinger, Johannes Grenzfurthner, Thomas Ballhaus (Eds.): Mind and Matter. Comparative Approaches towards Complexity, Bielefeld: transcript 2011, S. 29–37.
- World Skin: un panorama d’une bataille virtuelle, in: Maurice Benayoun: Open Art 1980–2010, Paris: Nouvelles éditions Scala 2011, pp. 61–62.
- Media Art's Challenge for our Societies. in: 2010 International Humanities Conference, Boundary Crossing Humanities and Symbiotic Society, Yonsei University, Seoul 2010, S. 163–193.
- Imagery in the 21st Century. MIT-Press, Cambridge 2011. With contributions by James Elkins, Eduardo Kac, Peter Weibel, Lev Manovich, Olaf Breitbach, Martin Kemp, Sean Cubitt, Christa Sommerer, Marie Luise Angerer, Wendy Chun a.o.
- Renewing knowledge structures for Media Art. in: EVA London 2010. Electronic Visualisation and the Arts, BCS London, Alan SEAL, Jonathan BOWEN and Kia NG (Eds.), S. 286–295.
- Media Art & Digital Humanities, in: Technology Imagination Future, Journal for Transdisciplinary Knowledge Design, Vol. 4, No. 1, 2010, pp. 1–22.
- Истории на медиумската уметност (Media Art Histories, Macedonian Translation), Генекс, Кочани, 2009
- Lembrem a Fantasmagoria! Política da Ilusão do Século XVIII e sua vida após a morte Multimídia, In: Diana Domingues: Arte, Ciência e Tecnologia (Media Art Histories, Portuguese Translation), São Paulo, Editora Unesp: 2009
- Living Habitats: Immersive Strategies. in: Christa Sommerer, Laurent Mignonneau (Hg.): Interactive Art Research, Springer, Vienna/New York 2009, pp. 170–175.
- Das Pionierarchiv der Medienkunst: Virtualart.at, in: Kunstgeschichte aktuell, 1/09, p. 8
- Media Art Needs Histories and Archives. in: Zhuangshi, Beijing 2008, No. 7, S. 50–61.
- Virtuelna umetnost, (Virtual Art: From Illusion to Immersion, Serbian Translation), Beograd: Clio, 2008.
- Media art needs Histories and Archives (Korean Translation), In: The 5th Seoul international Media Art Biennale, conference proceedings, Seoul: 2008
- Intermedijske etap navidezne resni`cnosti v 20. stoletju: Umetnost kot navdih evolucije medijev (Intermedia Stages of Virtual Reality in the Twentieth Century: Art as Inspiration of Evolving Media, Slovenian Translation), In: Mojca Zlokarnik: Likovne Besede, Ljubljana, Janus: 2008.
- The Recombinant Reality – Immersion and Interactive Image Spaces. in: Synthetic Times, Cambridge, M.A.: MIT Press 2008, S. 72-93 (German/Chinese).
- “Vorsicht! Es scheint, das er direkt auf die Dunkelheit zustürzt, in der Sie sitzen.” Immersions- und Emotionsforschung, Kernelemente der Bildwissenschaft. in: Klaus Herding/Antje Krause-Wahl (Eds.): Wie sich Gefühle Ausdruck verschaffen, Taunusstein: Verlag Dr. H. H. Driesen GmbH 2007, pp. 263–288.
- Media Art Histories, MIT Press/Leonardo Book Series, 2007.
- Phantasmagorischer Bildzauber des 18. Jahrhunderts und sein Nachleben in der Medienkunst. in: Brigitte Felderer (Ed.): Rare Künste: Zur Kultur und Mediengeschichte der Zauberkunst, Vienna 2006, pp. 461–480.
- Virtual Art: From Illusion to Immersion, (Chinese Translation), Tsinghua University Press 2006.
- Kunst als Inspiration medialer Evolution: Überwindungsvisionen der Kinoleinwand vom Stereopticon zur Telepräsenz. in: Thomas Hensel, Klaus Krüger, Tanja Michalsky (Eds.): Das bewegte Bild. Film und Kunst, Munich 2006, pp. 419–448.
- MedienKunstGeschichte: Für eine transdisziplinäre Bildwissenschaft in: Matthias Bruhn and Karsten Borgmann (Eds.): Sichtbarkeit der Geschichte. Beiträge zu einer Historiografie der Bilder / ed. for H-Arthist and H-Soz-u-Kult. Berlin: Clio-online and Humboldt University of Berlin 2005.
- Mediale Emotionen. Zur Lenkung von Gefühlen durch Bild und Sound Fischer, Frankfurt/Main 2005.
- Arte Virtual. Da Ilusào à imersào (Virtual Art, Portuguese Translation), São Paulo, Editora Unesp: 2005.
- Digitale-Kunst-Geschichte: Traditionslinien - Innovationsbrüche - Erweiterte Dokumentation, in: Zukunftsvisionen: Kunst und Kunstgeschichte in einer Zeit des Umbruchs, Hans-Jörg Heusser and Kornelia Imesch (Eds.), Schweizerisches Institut für Kunstwissenschaft, Zurich: Kongressband 2004.
- Der Digitale Bau: Aktuelle Tendenzen der Raumvisualisierung und ihre Vorläufer in: Thesis, Wissenschaftliche Zeitschrift der Bauhaus-Universität Weimar, 2004, Vol. 3, S. 112–121.
- Immersion and Interaktion, in: Dieter Daniels and Rudolf Frieling (Eds.): MedienKunst-Netz, commissioned by ZKM and Goethe-Institut 2003, pp. 292–313.
- For an Expanded Concept of Documentation: The Database of Virtual Art, ICHIM, École du Louvre, Cultural institutions and digital technology, acte publié avec le soutien de la Mission de la Recherche et de la Technologie du Ministère della Culture et de la Communication, Paris 2003, Proceedings, CD-Rom, pp. 2–15.
- Virtual Art: From Illusion to Immersion, MIT Press/Leonardo Book Series, 2003.
- The Database of Virtual Art: For an expanded concept of documentation, in: ICHIM, Ecole du Louvre, Ministere de la Culture et de la Communication, Proceedings, Paris 2003, S. 2–15.
- Bilder von Kunst und Wissenschaft: Auf dem Weg zur Bildwissenschaft, in: Gegenworte: Zeitschrift für den Disput über Wissen, edited by BBAW, Berlin 2002, pp. 25–30.
- Kunst als Inspiration medialer Evolution. Intermediale Etappen des Virtuellen im 20. Jahrhundert, in: Christoph Tholen (Ed.): Intervalle 5, Schriftenreihe des Wissenschaftlichen Zentrums der Universität Kassel: Kassel University Press 2002, pp. 57–76.
- New Images from Life, in: Art Inquiry: Recherches sur les Arts, Ryszard Kluszinsky (Ed.), annual publication by Lodz Scientific Society, 2001, pp. 7–26.
- Das Sedanpanorama: Einübung soldatischen Gehorsams im Staatsbild durch Präsenz, in: Wilhelm Voßkamp a.o. (Eds.): Medien der Präsenz, Cologne: DuMont 2001, pp. 143–169.
- Zwischen Bildsuggestion und Distanzgewinn, in: Klaus Sachs-Hombach (Ed.): Vom Realismus der Bilder: Interdisziplinäre Forschungen zur Semantik bildlicher Darstellungsformen, Magdeburg 2001, pp. 213–227.
- Telepräsenz: Zu Genealogie und Epistemologie von Interaktion und Simulation, in: Peter Gendolla u.a. (Hg.): Formen interaktiver Medienkunst. Geschichte, Tendenzen, Utopien, Frankfurt/Main: Suhrkamp 2001, S. 39–63.
- The History of Telepresence: Automata, Illusion, and The Rejection of the Body in: Ken Goldberg (Ed.): The Robot in the Garden: Telerobotics and Telepistemology on the Internet, Cambridge/Mass.: MIT-Press 2000, pp. 226–246.
- Verlust des Zeugen: Das lebendige Werk, in: Götz Darsow (Ed.): Metamorphosen: Zur Veränderung der Gedächtnismedien im Computerzeitalter, Stuttgart 2000, pp. 101–121.
- Bildarchitektur - Zur Geschichte und Aktualität des bildlichen Illusionsraumes, in: Arch+: Die Zeitschrift für Architektur und Städtebau, Issue 149/150, April 2000, pp. 102–108.
- Into the Belly of the Image: Historical Aspects of Virtual Reality, in: Leonardo: Journal of the International Society for the Arts, Sciences and Technology (Leonardo/ISAST), Vol. 32, Issue 5, 1999, pp. 365–372.
- Hingabe an das Nichts: Der Cyberspace zwischen Utopie, Ökonomie und Kunst, in: Medien.Kunst.Passagen, No. 4, 1994, pp. 17–30.

== Boardmember of scientific journals and institutions ==
- Interdisciplinary Society for Image Science, 2010.
- RUNDBRIEF FOTOGRAFIE, 2009-, Deutschland
- International Journal of Arts and Technology, United Kingdom 2007
- EKFRASE: Nordisk Tidsskrift for Visuell Kultur, Norway (2010-2016)
- International Journal of Media & Cultural Politics, United Kingdom 2006
- IMAGES, Journal for Visual Studies in Southeast Europe
- IJArt Journal, United Kingdom
- JUNCTURES The Journal for Thematic Dialogue, New Zealand
- Jordan Journal of the Arts
- SECOND NATURE: International Journal of Creative Media, Australia
- Interdisciplinary Research Center Humanities/Art/Technology, Adam Mickiewicz University, Poznan, 2010.
- St. Petersburg Branch of the Russian Institute for Cultural Research, Machina Media, 2012.
- Arte y Sociedad, Research Magazine
- Revista de Estudios Globales y Arte Contemporaneo, E 2012.
