= Jeffrey Shaw =

Australian visual artist

Jeffrey Shaw (born 1944 in Melbourne) is a visual artist known for being a leading figure in new media art. In a prolific career of widely exhibited and critically acclaimed work, he has pioneered the creative use of digital media technologies in the fields of expanded cinema, interactive art, virtual, augmented and mixed reality, immersive visualization environments, navigable cinematic systems and interactive narrative. Shaw was co-designer of Algie the inflatable pig, which was photographed above Battersea Power Station for the 1977 Pink Floyd album, Animals.

Shaw's numerous internationally exhibited and critically acclaimed artworks are milestones of technological and cultural innovation that have had a seminal impact on the theory, design, and application of digital media in art, society, and industry, and his artistic achievements are amongst the most cited in new media literature. During his career, his works have been presented at leading public galleries museums including the Stedelijk Museum Amsterdam, Centre Georges Pompidou Paris, Kunsthalle Bern, Guggenheim Museum New York, ZKM Karlsruhe, Hayward Gallery London and Power Station of Art Shanghai. Shaw's career is also distinguished by his collaborations with fellow artists including Tjebbe van Tijen, Theo Botschuijver, Dirk Groeneveld, Peter Gabriel/Genesis, Agnes Hegedüs, David Pledger, The Wooster Group, William Forsythe, Dennis Del Favero, Peter Weibel, Jean Michel Bruyere, Bernd Lintermann, Harry de Wit, John Latham and Sarah Kenderdine.

Without Shaw’s output we would be unaware of the full range of electronic media art.

— Peter Weibel (Director and CEO, ZKM Center for Art and Media Karlsruhe), Sculpture,

Jeffrey Shaw’s symbolic structures provide both meaning and mystery to pathways through the unsignposted space of virtuality.

— Anne-Marie Duguet (Professor, Pantheon-Sorbonne University), Jeffrey Shaw: From Expanded Cinema to Virtual Reality

== Biography ==
The son of Polish immigrants, Shaw was born in 1944 in Melbourne and studied at Melbourne High School and the University of Melbourne. Shaw left Australia in 1965 after two years of university studies in architecture and art history, and for the next 25 years, he resided in Milan, London and Amsterdam. Shaw studied sculpture at Brera Academy, Milan and Central Saint Martins, London.

Shaw was a founding member of Artist Placement Group in London (1966–1989) and of the Eventstructure Research Group in Amsterdam (1969–1979). On Heinrich Klotz’s invitation, he moved to Germany in 1991 to take the position of the founding director of the ZKM Center for Art and Media Karlsruhe. For the next 11 years, he initiated and led a seminal artistic research, production and exhibition program at the ZKM that included residencies and the creation of new works by many of the most notable media artists of his time. He also curated ground breaking new media art exhibitions such as Bitte berühren, Newfoundland, Future Cinema and the ArtIntAct series of digital publications. In 1995, Shaw was appointed Professor of Media Art at the Karlsruhe University of Arts and Design (HfG), Germany.

Shaw was awarded an Australian Research Council Federation Fellowship in 2003, and returned to Australia to co-found and direct the UNSW iCinema Centre for Interactive Cinema Research in Sydney. At iCinema he led a research program in immersive interactive post-narrative systems, which produced pioneering artistic and research works such as T Visionarium shown at the Biennial of Seville in 2008.

In 2009 Shaw joined the City University of Hong Kong as Chair Professor of Media Art and until 2015 he was also Dean of the School of Creative Media. In 2010, together with Professor Sarah Kenderdine, he established the CityU Applied Laboratory for Interactive Visualization and Embodiment (ALiVE) at the Hong Kong Science Park, a next-generation platform for interdisciplinary applications in digital cultural heritage that included Pure Land – Inside the Mogao Caves at Dunhuang shown at the Arthur M. Sackler Gallery, Smithsonian Washington in 2012. Over the last years, this research trajectory includes projects relating to Chinese martial arts (with Mr. Hing Chao) and the Confucian Rites (with Professor Peng Lin and Mr. Johnson Chang).

Currently Shaw is Yeung Kin Man Chair Professor of Media Art at City University Hong Kong, Director of the CityU Centre for Applied Computing and Interactive Media (Hong Kong and Chengdu), Visiting Professor at Central Academy of Fine Arts, Beijing, Honorary Professor at the Danube University Krems, Austria, University Distinguished Professor at UNSW Australia, Visiting Professor at the Institute of Global Health Innovation, Imperial College London, and Visiting Professor at the Laboratory for Experimental Museology at École Polytechnique Fédérale de Lausanne (EPFL).

== Awards and honours ==
Shaw's awards and honours include: Immagine Elettronica Prize, Ferrara, Italy, 1990; Oribe Award, Gifu, Japan 2005; Honorary Doctorate in Creative Media, Multimedia University, Malaysia, 2012; Lifetime Achievement Award, Society of Art and Technology, Montreal, Canada, 2014; Ars Electronica Golden Nica for Visionary Pioneer of Media Art, Linz, Austria, 2015.

== Curation ==
- 2018 - ANiMAL: Art Science Nature Society Exhibition (co-curated with Isabelle Frank, Hsieh Chun-Ko, Lin Zhi-Yan, Pu Li-An, Wu Shao-Chun), CityU Exhibition Gallery, City University of Hong Kong, Hong Kong, China.
- 2018 - Safeguarding the Community: An intangible Cultural Heritage New Media Exhibition (co-curated with Sarah Kenderdine and Hing Chao), Hong Kong City Hall, Hong Kong, China.
- 2018 - Kung Fu Motion EPFL (co-curated with Sarah Kenderdine and Hing Chao), ArtLab, Ecole polytechnique fédérale de Lausanne, Lausanne, Switzerland.
- 2017 - Kung Fu Motion (co-curated with Sarah Kenderdine and Hing Chao), Asia-Pacific Triennial of Performing Arts Festival, Immigration Museum, Melbourne, Australia.
- 2017 - Lingnan Hung Kuen Across the Century: Kung Fu Narratives in Cinema and Community (co-curated with Sarah Kenderdine and Hing Chao), Hong Kong Visual Arts Centre, Hong Kong, China; CityU Exhibition Gallery, City University of Hong Kong, Hong Kong, China.
- 2017 - Sincerely Yours: Personal Letters from Tsinghua Scholars (co-curated with Du Pengfei, Fan Baolong and Isabelle Frank), CityU Exhibition Gallery, City University of Hong Kong, Hong Kong, China.
- 2017 - Giuseppe Castiglione – Lang Shining New Media Art Exhibition (co-curated with Hsieh Chun-ko, Hwang Wang-hwa and Kuo Chen-wo), Magong Jinguitou Fortress Cultural Park, Penghu, Taiwan.
- 2016 - 300 Years of Hakka Kungfu (co-curated with Sarah Kenderdine and Hing Chao), Hong Kong Heritage Museum, Hong Kong, China; Academic 3, City University of Hong Kong, Hong Kong, China.
- 2016 - POST PiXEL.: Animamix Biennale 2015-16, Chief Curator, CMC Gallery, Run Run Shaw Creative Media Centre, City University of Hong Kong; MoCA Shanghai.
- 2016 - Rebuilding the Tong-an Ships New Media Art Exhibition (co-curated with Sarah Kenderdine), Songshan Feng-Tian Temple, National Palace Museum, Taipei, Taiwan.
- 2016 - Giuseppe Castiglione – Lang Shining New Media Art Exhibition (co-curated with Hsieh Chun-ko, Hwang Wang-hwa and Kuo Chen-wo), Opera di Santa Croce, Florence, Italy; Academic 3, City University of Hong Kong, Hong Kong, China.
- 2016 - Trans>Formations, Hong Kong - Macau Visual Art Biennale, Beijing Minsheng Art Museum, Beijing 2016, Silk Road International Convention and Expo Center, Dunhuang 2016, Henan Art Museum, Zhengzhou 2016.
- 2015 - Giuseppe Castiglione – Lang Shining New Media Art Exhibition (co-curated with Hsieh Chun-ko, Hwang Wang-hwa and Kuo Chen-wo), National Palace Museum, Taipei, Taiwan.
- 2015 - Rebuilding the Tong-an Ships New Media Art Exhibition (co-curated with Sarah Kenderdine), Academic 3, City University of Hong Kong, Hong Kong, China.
- 2014 – Fleeting Light (co-curated with Maurice Benayoun) 4th Large Scale Interactive Media Art Exhibition, Hong Kong.
- 2012 - PLACE - Hampi Museum (co-curated with Sarah Kenderdine), Kaladham, Vidyanagara Museum, Karnataka, India.
- 2012 - Run Run Shaw Creative Media Centre Grand Opening Festival, City University of Hong Kong, Hong Kong, China.
- 2002 – Future Cinema (co-curated with Peter Weibel), Center for Art and Media Karlsruhe (ZKM), Karlsruhe; Kiasma, Helsinki and NTT InterCommunication Center, Tokyo
- 2000 – Net_Condition, Center for Art and Media Karlsruhe (ZKM), Karlsruhe, Germany.
- 1998 – Surrogate, Center for Art and Media Karlsruhe (ZKM), Karlsruhe, Germany.
- 1997 – Current, Multimediale 5, Center for Art and Media Karlsruhe (ZKM), Karlsruhe, Germany.
- 1995 – NewFoundland II (co-curated with Manuela Abel, Nüria Büisah, Manfred Hauffen and Astrid Sommer), Multimediale 4, Opelgelände, Karlsruhe, Germany.
- 1993 – NewFoundland, Multimediale 3, Karlsruhe, Germany.
- 1992 – Bitte berühren, Drei Projekte, Unterkirche der Ev. Stadtkirche Karlsruhe am Marktplatz, Karlsruhe, Germany.

== Selected works ==
- Recombinatorial Poetry Wheel, 2018 (with Sarah Kenderdine and Edwin Nadason Thumboo), DIA-LOGOS: Ramon Llull & the Ars Combinatoria, ZKM, Karlsruhe, Germany; Thinking Machines: Ramon Llull & the Ars Combinatoria, ArtLab, Ecole polytechnique fédérale de Lausanne, Lausanne, Switzerland
- Kung Fu Visualization, 2016 (with Sarah Kenderdine), 300 Years of Hakka Kung Fu, Hong Kong Heritage Museum, Hong Kong, China
- IN_SIDE VIEW, 2016 (with Sarah Kenderdine), DIGITAL SYNESTHESIA, Angewandte Innovation Laboratory, University of Applied Arts Vienna, Vienna, Austria
- Look Up Mumbai, 2015 (with Sarah Kenderdine and Bernd Lintermann), Chhatrapati Shivaji Maharaj Vastu Sangrahalaya, Mumbai, India
- mArchive, 2014 (with Sarah Kenderdine, David Chesworth (sound), Dennis Del Favero and Tim Hart), Museum Victoria, Melbourne, Australia
- Remaking the Confucian Rites, 2014 (with Sarah Kenderdine), Third International Symposium on Ritual Studies, China Academy of Art, Hangzhou, China
- Fall Again, Fall Better, 2012 (with Sinan Goo), 9th Shanghai Biennale, Power Station of Art, Shanghai, China
- Pure Land AR, 2012 (with Sarah Kenderdine and Leith Chan), Art HK 2012, Hong Kong Convention and Exhibition Centre, Hong Kong, China
- ECLOUD WWI, 2012 (with Sarah Kenderdine and Cédric Maridet), Europeana Awareness Day, Brussels, Belgium
- Pure Land 360, 2012 (with Sarah Kenderdine and Cédric Maridet), Run Run Shaw Creative Media Centre, City University of Hong Kong, Hong Kong, China
- UNMAKEABLELOVE, 2008 (with Sarah Kenderdine and Ulf Langheinrich), eArts Festival: eLandscapes, Shanghai Science and Technology Museum, Shanghai, China
- T_Visionarium II, 2006 (with Neil Brown, Dennis Del Favero, Matt McGinity, and Peter Weibel), Biennial of Seville 2008
- PLACE – Hampi, 2006 (with Sarah Kenderdine, Paul Doornbusch and John Gollings), Lille 3000, Lille, France
- Eavesdrop, 2004 (with David Pledger), Sydney Festival, Powerhouse Museum, Sydney, Australia
- Cupola, 2004 (with Bernd Lintermann), European Cultural Capital of Europe 2004, Eurolille, Lille, France
- Web of Life, 2002 (with Torsten Belschner, Michael Gleich, Bernd Lintermann, Lawrence Wallen, and Manfred Wolff-Plottegg), Museum für Kommunikation, Frankfurt, Germany
- PLACE - Ruhr, 2000, Vision Ruhr, Dortmund, Germany
- conFiguring the CAVE, 1996 (with Agnes Hegedüs, Bernd Lintermann, and Leslie Stuck), NTT InterCommunication Center, Tokyo, Japan
- PLACE – a user's manual, 1995, Neue Galerie Graz, Austria
- Golden Calf, 1994, Ars Electronica, Linz, Austria
- Virtual Museum, 1991, Das Belebte Bild, Art Frankfurt, Frankfurt, Germany
- Revolution, 1990 (with Tjebbe van Tijen), Imago, KunstRAI, Amsterdam, Netherlands
- Imaginary Museum of Revolutions, 1988 (with Tjebbe van Tijen) Brucknerhaus, Linz, Austria
- Legible City, 1989 (with Dirk Groeneveld), Bonnefanten Museum, Maastricht, Netherlands
- Heaven's Gate, 1987 (with Harry de Wit), Shaffy Theater, Amsterdam, Netherlands
- Inventer la Terre, 1986, La Villette, Paris, France
- Narrative Landscape, 1985 (with Dirk Groeneveld), Amsterdam, Netherlands
- Points of View, 1983, Mickery Theater, Amsterdam, Netherlands
- The Lamb Lies Down on Broadway, 1975 (Eventstructure Research Group) Genesis World Tour
- Viewpoint, 1975 (Eventstructure Research Group) 6th Biennale de Paris, Musee d'Art Moderne, Paris, France
- Waterwalk, 1969 (Eventstructure Research Group) Brighton Festival, Brighton, England
- MovieMovie, 1967 (Eventstructure Research Group) 4th Experimental Film Festival, Knokke le Zoute, Belgium
- Corpocinema, 1967 (Eventstructure Research Group) Sigma Projects, Museumplein, Amsterdam, Netherlands
- Continuous Sound and Image Moments, 1966 (with Tjebbe van Tijen and Willem Breuker) Netherlands Film Museum, Amsterdam, Netherlands

== Representative recent publications ==
- Kenderdine, S. & Shaw, J. (2017), ‘Archives in Motion: Motion as Meeting’, in Museum and Archive on the Move: Changing Cultural Institutions in the Digital Era, (eds) Grau, O., Coones, W., Rühse, V., De Gruyter, pp. 211–233
- Shaw, J. (2016) ‘Collaborative Models for AVIE’, in Sanderson, E. (ed) Unfolding Space and Time, Jeffrey Shaw and Hu Jieming Twofold Exhibition, Shanghai, China Academy of Art Press, pp. 22–25 and 44-85
- Kenderdine, S and Shaw, J (2014) ‘A Cultural Heritage Panorama: Trajectories in Embodied Museography’, in H Din and S Wu (eds), Digital Heritage and Culture – Strategy and Implementation, Singapore: World Scientific Publishing Co, pp. 197–218
- Chan, L, Kenderdine, S and Shaw, J (2013) ‘Spatial User Interface for Experiencing Mogao Caves’, in Proceedings of the 1st Symposium on Spatial User Interaction, New York: ACM, pp. 21–24.
- Kenderdine, S.and Shaw, J. and Gremmler, T. (2012) ‘Cultural Data Sculpting: Omnidirectional Visualization for Cultural Datasets’, in FT Marchese and E Banissi (eds), Knowledge Visualization Currents: From Text to Art to Culture, London: Springer-Verlag, pp. 199–221
- Shaw, J. and Kenderdine, S. (2012) ‘Making UNMAKEABLELOVE: The Relocation of Theatre’, in R Vanderbeeken, B de Backere, D Depestel and C Stalpaert (eds), Theater Topics: Bastard or Playmate? Adapting Theatre, Mutating Media and Contemporary Performing Arts, Amsterdam: Amsterdam University Press, pp. 102–120.
- Shaw, J., Kenderdine, S. and Coover, R., (2011) ‘Re-Place: The Embodiment of Virtual Space’, in T Bartscherer and R Coover (eds), Switching Codes: Thinking Through Digital Technology in the Humanities and the Arts, Chicago: Univ. of Chicago Press, pp. 218–238.

== Selected bibliography ==
- Castelli, R., (Ed) Cinemas of the Future, Lille 2004 Capitale Europeenne de la Culture, 2004, pp. 50–53, 56–57, 78–79.
- De Mèredieu, F., (Ed) Histoire de l'Art Moderne. Matérielle et immatérielle, Larrouse, Paris, 1994, pp. 303–305.
- Dinkla, S., Pioniere interaktiver Kunst von 1970 bis heute: Hatje Cantz, Ostfildern, 1997, pp. 97–146.
- Druckery, T., Weibel, P. (Eds.) Net Condition, MIT Press, Cambridge, 2001.
- Duguet, A-M., Klotz, H., Weibel, P., Jeffrey Shaw – a user's manual. From Expanded Cinema to Virtual Reality, Hatje Cantz, Ostfildern, 1997.
- Evenstructure Research Group: Concepts for an Operational Art, in: Art and Artists, London, January 1969.
- Grosenick, U., and Riemschneider, B., (Eds), Art at the Turn of the Millennium, Taschen Verlag, Cologne, 1999, pp. 462–465.
- Hansen, M. B. N., Framing the Digital Image: Jeffrey Shaw and the Embodied Aesthetics of New Media, in: New Philosophy for New Media, MIT Press, Cambridge 2004.
- Gleich, M., Shaw, J., The Web of Life – Linking Art and Science, Aventis Foundation and ZKM Karlsruhe, 2004.
- Oliver Grau: Virtual Art: From Illusion to Immersion, MIT-Press, Cambridge 2003, pp 240–243.
- Huhtamo, E., Jeffrey Shaw's EVE and the Panoramic Tradition, in: ICC InterCommunication, No. 14, Tokyo, Autumn 1995, pp. 138–139.
- Kenderdine, S., Shaw. J., Del Favero, D. and Brown, Place-Hampi: Co-Evolutionary Narrative & Augmented Stereographic Panoramas, Vijayanagara, India in: New Heritage, New Media And Cultural Heritage, Kalay, Y. E., Kvan, T., and Affleck, J.,(Eds.) Routledge, Oxfordshire, 2008.
- Manovich, L., The Language of New Media, MIT Press, Cambridge, 2001, pp 226, 260–261, 282–285.
- Margaret Morse, M., (Ed) Hardware, Software, Artware – Art Practice at the ZKM Institute for Visual Media, 1992–1997, ZKM Karlsruhe, 1997.
- Paul, C., Digital Art, Thames & Hudson Ltd. 2003.
- Popper, F., Art of the Electronic Age, Thames & Hudson, 1997.
- Popper, F., From Technological to Virtual Art, MIT Press, Cambridge, MA, 2007.
- Rötzer, F., Jeffrey Shaw: "Reisen in virtuelle Realitäten" in: Kunstform, Vol. 117, 1992.
- Rush, M., New Media in Late 20th-Century Art, London, New York, 1999, pp. 210–212.
- Schwarz, H. P., Media Art History, Prestel-Verlag, Munich 1997.
- Shaw, J., Movies after Film – The Digitally Expanded Cinema, in: New Screen Media. M. Rieser, M., and Zapp, A., (Eds) British Film Institute, London 2002.
- Shaw, J: Der entkörperte und wiederverkörperte Leib (The Dis-Embodied Re-Embodied Body), in: Kunstforum. Die Zukunft des Körpers I, 1996, pp132.
- Shaw, J., Weibel, P., Future Cinema. The Cinematic Imaginary after Film, MIT Press, Cambridge, 2003.
- Thomson, C. W.m, Visionary Architecture. From Babylon to Virtual Reality, Prestel, München/New York, 1994.
- Topham, S., Blow Up. Inflatable Art, Architecture and Design. Prestel, Munich, 2002 pp. 86–90.
- Wilson, S., Information Arts. Intersections of Art, Science, and Technology, MIT Press, Cambridge, 2002, pp. 709–712, 760–761.
