= Tjebbe =

Tjebbe is a Dutch given name. Notable people with the given name include:

- Tjebbe van Oostenbruggen (born 1979), Dutch politician
- Tjebbe van Tijen (born 1944), Dutch artist
