= Artist-in-residence =

Artist who works at a specific venue or place for a period of time

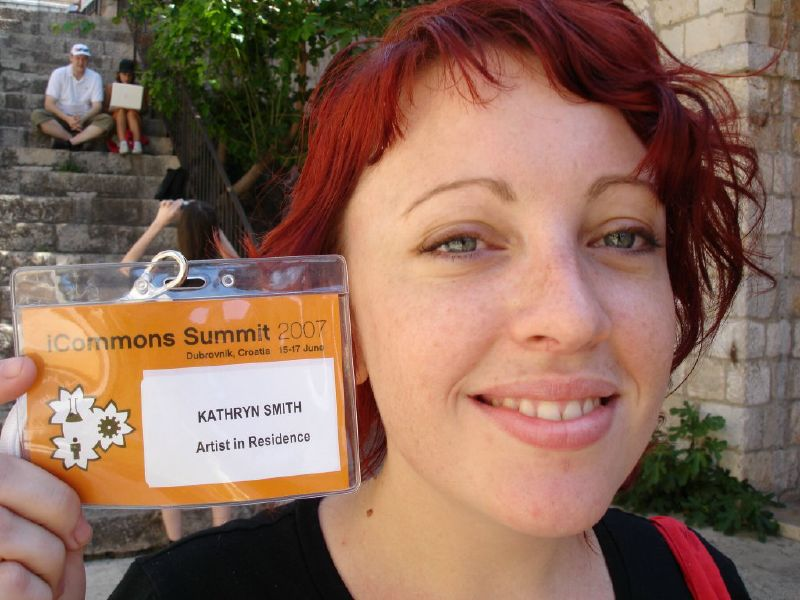
Kathryn Smith, an artist-in-residence residing in South Africa

Artist residencies encompass a wide spectrum of artistic programs that involve a collaboration between artists and hosting organisations, institutions, or communities; providing artists with space and resources to support their artistic practice. Someone who participates in such a program is known as an artist-in-residence or writer-in-residence. Contemporary artist residencies are becoming increasingly thematic, with artists working together with their host in pursuit of a specific outcome related to a particular theme.

== Definitions ==
An artist residency is an opportunity provided by a host organisation that enables a guest artist to work in a new environment, often away from the restrictions and pressures of their everyday lives. Artist residencies are about providing the time and space for a guest artist to develop work and creatively explore new ideas.

— artsACT, Australian Capital Territory

== History ==
Artist groups resembling artist residencies can be traced back to at least the 16th century Europe, when art academies began to emerge. In 1563 Duke of Florence Cosimo Medici and Tuscan painter Giorgio Vasari co-founded the Accademia del Disegno, which may be considered the first academy of arts. It was the first institution to promote the idea that artists may benefit from a localised site dedicated to the advancement of their practice. In the 17th century, the state of France funded the Prix de Rome, a scholarship financing artists to train for three to five years in institutions such as the Palazzo Mancini in Rome and the Villa Medici in Florence. During the 19th century in Europe, artist communities began emerging in the countryside, where the outdoor setting was considered a catalyst for inspiration and the collaborative development of artistic ideas among the communities. A century later in 1919, the Staatliches Bauhaus emerged as a "counter-reaction to the model of academic education, where the artist is isolated from society".

The mid-20th century saw a large wave of artist residencies, particularly during the 1960s. The Artist Placement Group (APG) is widely considered to be one of the earliest iterations of an artist-residency, and was the first of its kind in the United Kingdom. The APG was founded in 1962 by visual artists Barbara Steveni and John Latham. The group is significant to the history of artist residencies, as it was one of the first major residencies to introduce visual artists into institutions. Steveni conceived the idea of an artist residency program whilst sourcing material to use in her artistic practice from a factory. The visit led Steveni to consider what benefits might come from a program that directly engaged artists in private institutions. The APG's objective was to promote the influence of art on society, and the influence of society on art, by "bridg[ing] the gap between artists and people at work so that each may gain from the other's perspectives and approaches to an activity". The wave of artist residency programs emerging in Europe in the 1960s may be attributed to several factors, including: the emergence and growth of regional arts associations; government changes in arts policy framework; and a shifting preference towards "community arts". In the United Kingdom, the increase in artist residencies during the mid-1960s coincided with a new Labour government, and in particular the new government’s writing of the 1965 White Paper, Policy for the Arts: the first steps, and redrawing of the Arts Council's Royal Charter in 1967. According to arts academic Kevin Stephens, "the key change [in the new charter] was its reference to 'the arts' rather than 'the fine arts exclusively'". This shift away from the predominance of high arts encouraged more experimental practices, which were facilitated by the model of artist residencies. These artist residency programs consisted almost exclusively of visual arts residencies. Although throughout the 1960s residency opportunities for poets, composers, and musicians appeared, the scene was nevertheless dominated by visual artists.

During the 1970s and 1980s, residency opportunities became increasingly common. They began to develop similar tendencies, indicating an emergent field of artist-in-residence programs. During the 1980s and 1990s, increased globalisation allowed residencies to become more accessible to artists from overseas, with institutions opening up their residency programs to international artists. The expansion of the internet in the early 2000s further globalised artist residencies, as cheaper and more immediate forms of communication allowed the organisation and application processes of international artist residencies to become easier and timelier. By the 2010s, artist residencies had become widely considered by artists to be "an indispensable part of their career".

=== Cité internationale des arts ===
The Cité Internationale des Arts, a private foundation recognized as a public benefit organization, has managed the world's largest artist residency in the heart of Paris since its creation, in 1965.

A uniquely structured institution, it works with 200 international partners—foreign governments, museums, art centers, artistic associations, and universities—to offer residency programs to emerging and established figures in contemporary art.

Important tool for French cultural diplomacy and for the promotion of contemporary creation, it welcomes approximately 1,000 artists each year, from all nationalities and artistic disciplines. Its alumni include more than 35,000 artists, including Joan Jonas, Gary Hill, Carrie Mae Weems, Thomas Ruff, Lorna Simpson, Wolfgang Tillmans, Apichatpong Weerasethakul, Zanele Muholi, Dominique Gonzalez-Foerster, James Coleman, Thomas Demand, Anri Sala, Youssef Nabil, Johan Grimonprez, Louise Bourgeois, Alighiero Boetti, Dan Graham, Ilya Kabakov, Gabriel Orozco, Philippe Parreno, Pierre Huyghe, Huang Yong Ping, Giulio Paolini, Richard Tuttle, Howardena Pindell, Tatiana Trouvé, Miriam Cahn, Anne Imhof, Maria Nordman, ORLAN, Jean-Michel Othoniel, Haegue Yang, Kimsooja, Ulla von Brandenburg, Johan Creten, Adel Abdessemed, Nil Yalter, Chéri Samba, Peter Saul, Haris Epaminonda, Emily Jacir, Harmony Hammond, Simone Fattal, Lygia Clark, Serge Gainsbourg, etc.

== Impacts of artist residencies ==
A survey conducted by the International Federation of Arts Councils and Culture Agencies (IFACCA) in 2013 studied the general motives and intended impacts of artist residency programs. Collecting data from 18 countries and six continents, IFACCA found the most popular motivations of respondents to be: "To provide a professional development opportunity for the artist (88%)", "To support the creation or development of new artistic work (75%)", "Cultural cooperation (31%)", and "To be part of a local community development program (19%)".

=== Community ===
A study on the Artists in Architecture residency in Praiano, Italy, found that residents of the town expressed higher feelings of propensity to art, custody, social cohesion, and creativity in interviews conducted six months after the completion of the short-term residency. The study's researchers suggested that this finding supported the proposition that artist residencies, by linking art practice with a localised space, may greatly benefit the surrounding community. They suggested that in funding the residency, the town of Praiano demonstrated to its citizens a commitment to the arts, which may effectuate positive change in the wider community, through encouraging "the promotion of exhibitions, the activation of networks between the creative industries on a national scale, [and] the invitation of tour operators from the international market.".

=== Senior populations ===
Studies into the effects of arts programs on senior populations have been conducted since as early as the 1980s, and artist residencies have since become increasingly common in aged care facilities. Research has shown that programs led by artists-in-residence may significantly improve the overall quality of life of senior populations living in residential care. It has demonstrated that arts programs are capable of improving the physical health, mental health, and social wellbeing of senior populations. In particular, studies have observed that art programs may affect changes in overall health, a lower frequency of doctor visits and the use of prescription drugs, a lower rate of depression and feelings of loneliness, and an increase in participation in social activities. It has been suggested by one 2021 study that the benefits of art programs run by artists-in-residence at aged care facilities is due to their positive focus on the abilities and skills of participants. The study suggested that such works to directly counteract the way the inabilities of senior populations may be reinforced and highlighted by the complex care environment of many aged care facilities.

=== Education ===
Research has indicated that artist residencies may strengthen the art curricula in pre-kindergarten classrooms. A 2011 study conducted in an American child care centre found that a six-week artist residency had the effect of "transform[ing]… existing, craft-focused art practices to meaningful arts experiences that drew upon art-viewing, art-making and aesthetic experiences". Whilst it was not within the scope of the study to examine the long-term effects of an artist residency, it indicated that the aesthetic experience provided by the brief residency significantly increased student interest and engagement in art activities, at least for the duration of the study.

== Funding ==
Certain models of funding for artist residencies may include a per diem allowance for the participating artist. Other models of funding, often of non-for-profit entities, may provide no allowance, and may even require artists to pay a participation fee. There are generally multiple bodies involved in the facilitation and funding of artist residencies. These include a hosting organisation, institution or community, and the various funding bodies of the residency. Costs of funding artist residencies vary significantly according to the type, length, and nature of the program. They may include administration salaries, managerial salaries, hospitality, air fares, visa fees, materials, contracts, and accommodation. Residencies may also cover costs of the documentation and evaluation of the residency, which may be necessary for institutional records and program transparency. Funds may be collected from a variety of sources. They may be sourced from public means, private means, or a hybrid of both. An informal research study conducted by Res Artis collated data on the funding practices of 134 artist-in-residence programs. Of the 134 respondents, 73 received exclusively public funding, 34 received a combination of public and private funding, and 22 received a combination of public and self-generated funding. Public funds may be distributed from institutions at city, state, national, regional, and international levels. For example, the Künstlerhaus Stuttgart Atelierprogramm is a year-long artist residency program for emerging artists and art critics, funded by the city of Stuttgart. An example of funds being distributed from the national level is the Malta Arts Fund, which supports artists participating in residency programs. Examples of private funding bodies may include art galleries, businesses, scientific organisations, environmental organisations, hospitals, or schools.

== Policy ==
In recognition of the increasing prevalence of artist residencies, many national and state governments, their organs, and other non-government organisations, have released a form of policy guidelines for artist residencies.

=== Europe ===
In 2014 the European Union, working with the Working Group of EU Member States Experts on Artists' Residencies, published the Policy Handbook on Artists' Residencies". The handbook outlines in detail current trends and behaviours of institutions hosting artist residencies across Europe, and provides guidelines to direct EU states' implementation of good policy in running artist residencies. Their suggestions included: "ensur[ing] that there are clear, well-articulated aims and shared objectives by all parties involved"; "attend[ing] targeted training sessions (workshops and support) for artists, hosts, the community, and students"; and "ensur[ing] good evaluation takes place, documentation is produced and feedback is provided to inform future practice". At the national level, the handbook suggested that the improvement of "Inter-governmental communication at all levels of governance (sub-regional, local, city, etc.) ... in order to create a coherent strategy for artists' residencies".

=== United States ===
The Artist Communities Alliance (ACA) declares that it is "an international association based in the United States, founded in the aim of support[ing] the people who power the field of artist residencies". In 2020, the ACA released an article entitled "The Five Pillars of a Healthy Residency". The five essential "pillars" proposed were these:

1. Identity: "creat[ing] a culture where every stakeholder can be heard, respected, and actively participate in determining what the organization needs and how it will arrive there".
2. Program Design: "[o]rganizations must know who their core constituents are, what their roles are in your organization, and what activities support those individuals".
3. Operations: "work plans document processes and methods for getting work done while reinforcing policies and creating opportunities for staff to do their job well without heavy-handed oversight".
4. Resource Development: "[o]rganizations must have a clear understanding of their identity, their core constituents (who receives and who provides services), and how they'll achieve organizational goals".
5. Stewardship: "[o]rganizations must actively demonstrate care for artists, staff, partners, the land they steward, and the communities in which they exist in order to have climates where artists and staff can thrive".

=== Australia ===
The Australian Capital Territory (ACT) has developed and released an "Artists-in-Residence Toolkit" to guide the development of artist residency programs. Its suggestions include: clearly defining the residency's purpose; clearly defining the costs the hosting institution will be responsible for; and completing a detailed evaluation of the residency program at its completion.

== See also ==
- Visiting scholar – Scholar who visits another university

== Sources ==
- Eckhoff, Angela (2011). "Art experiments: introducing an artist-in-residence programme in early childhood education". Early Child Development and Care. 181 (3): 382. doi:10.1080/03004430903388089. S2CID 143849107.
- Australian Capital Territory Government. "Artist-in-Residence Toolkit" (PDF). Archived from the original (PDF) on 8 March 2022.
- European Union and Working Group of EU Member States Experts on Artists' Residencies (December 2014). "Policy Handbook on Artists' Residencies" (PDF).
- International Federation of Arts Councils and Cultural Agencies (2022). IFACCA D'Art Report No. 45: International Perspectives on Artist Residencies (Report).
- Li, Lucy; Wiebe, Carol; fleury, cj; Sveistrup, Heidi; Sheehy, Lisa (2021). "Impact of an artist-in-residence program in a complex continuing care hospital: a quality improvement investigation". Arts & Health. 11 (1).
- Pinto, Maria Rita; Viola, Serena; Onesti, Anna; Ciampa, Francesca (November 19, 2020). "Artists Residencies, Challenges and Opportunities for Communities' Empowerment and Heritage Regeneratio". Sustainability. 12 (22): 9651. doi:10.3390/su12229651.
- Richmond-Cullen, Catherine (2018). "The effect of an artist in residence program on self-reported loneliness in senior citizens". Educational Gerontology. 44 (7): 427–428. doi:10.1080/03601277.2018.1494369. S2CID 150185648.
- Rycroft, Simon (2019). "The Artist Placement Group: an archaeology of impact" (PDF). Cultural Geographies. 26 (3): 289–304. doi:10.1177/1474474018821860. S2CID 149875666.
- Sealy, U.; Lee, T. C. (2020). "Anatomy and Academies of Art I: Founding Academies of Art". Journal of Anatomy. 236 (4): 573–574. doi:10.1111/joa.13131. PMC 7083560. PMID 31813164.
- Stephens, Kevin (2001). "Artists in residence in England and the experience of the year of the artist". Cultural Trends. 11 (42): 41–76. doi:10.1080/09548960109365157. S2CID 144939761.
