= Mark Hanson (disambiguation) =

Mark Hanson (born 1946) is a former American Evangelical bishop.

Mark Hanson may also refer to:

- Mark Hanson, birth name of Hamza Yusuf, American Islamic scholar
- Mark Hanson, Democratic candidate in the California State Senate election, 2006
- Mark Hanson, character in Willed to Kill, played by Dylan Bruce
- Mark Hanson, character in Portrait of a Stripper played by K. C. Martel
- Mark Hanson (American football) (born 1965), American football player

== See also ==
- Mark Hansen (disambiguation)
