= Thomas Latham (cricketer) =

English barrister and cricketer

Personal information
- Full name: Thomas Latham
- Born: 22 June 1847; St Pancras, Middlesex, England
- Died: 13 January 1926 (aged 78); West Folkestone, Kent, England
- Batting: Right-handed
- Relatives: Geoffrey Latham (son)

Domestic team information
- Years: Team
- 1873–1874: Cambridge University
- 1874: Marylebone Cricket Club

Career statistics
Competition	First-class
Matches	9
Runs scored	293
Batting average	18.31
100s/50s	–/–
Top score	48
Catches/stumpings	5/–
- Source: Cricinfo, 20 April 2021

Thomas Latham (22 June 1847 – 13 January 1926) was an English barrister and cricketer who played first-class cricket for Cambridge University and the Marylebone Cricket Club (MCC) in 1873 and 1874. He was born in St Pancras, London, the son of Henry Latham, a Chancery registrar, and died at Folkestone, Kent.

As a cricketer, Latham was a middle-order right-handed batsman. After non-first-class trials matches in 1872, he played fairly regularly in first-team matches for Cambridge University in 1873, and he was picked for the University Match against Oxford University, in which he scored 0 and 48 in a match that Cambridge lost narrowly. The 48 was Latham's highest score in first-class cricket. In 1874 he played for MCC against Cambridge University in the university's match immediately before the University Match, and then was picked for his second game against Oxford; this time, he was less successful with innings of 1 and 4, and Cambridge lost the game by an innings. It was Latham's last appearance in first-class cricket, though he appeared in minor matches for amateur teams to the mid-1880s.

== Career outside cricket ==
Educated at Highgate School, Winchester College and St John's College, Cambridge, Latham graduated in 1874 and was called to the bar as a barrister in the same year. He practised on the Western circuit; then from 1881 to 1888 he was special pleader at the courts in Shanghai, after which he retired to Folkestone where he died in 1926. His son was the cricketer and colonial administrator Geoffrey Latham, while his grandson was the artist John Latham.
