= Tjebbe van Tijen =

Tjebbe van Tijen (born 1944, The Hague, Netherlands) is a sculptor, performance artist, curator, net artist, archivist, documentalist and media theorist who lives and works in Amsterdam. He is best known for his 1960s collaborative public performances, and for his later artworks and projects done in collaboration with archives and libraries.

== Life and education ==
Tjebbe van Tijen was born in 1944 in the Hague. From 1961 to 1965 he studied sculpture at schools in Den Bosch, Haarlem, Milan and London. In London he studied with Jeffrey Shaw (then a street artist), with whom he would later collaborate with on several projects.

== Art career ==
In the 1960s van Tijen was involved in numerous happenings in European cities.

=== Sigma Projects ===
Returning to Holland in 1967, he developed a number of collaborative street art projects in Amsterdam under the rubric of Sigma Projects. One such project, with Jeffrey Shaw and Willem Breuker, was Continuous Film, a film project of abstract imagery projected onto buildings with a live performed soundtrack. Another similar project Continuous Sound and Image Moments by the same trio involved a projected black-and-white animated film loop.

Another Sigma Project was the work titled Continuous Drawings. In it, and using various transportation including taxis and an airplane, van Tijen drew a line from the Institute for Contemporary Art in London to the Stedelijk Museum in Amsterdam, and from there to Rotterdam. During the execution of the London side of the drawing, van Tijen and his friend John Latham were arrested on 24 August 1966 by police for refusing to clean the pavement of their drawing.

=== Imaginary Museums ===
With Robert Hartzema, he founded the Research Center Art Technology and Society in Amsterdam, which operated from 1967 to 1969. The center was based within the Stedelijk Museum, Amsterdam. It later became the Documentation Center for Social History at the University Library, Amsterdam that operated from 1973 to 1998 and covered subjects related to the history of social activism within cities. Van Tijen operated both centres as curator under the rubric of his Imaginary Museums project.

In the 1980s van Tijen collaborated again with media artist Jeffrey Shaw on a project called the Imaginary Museum of the Revolution.
