= Keith Arnatt =

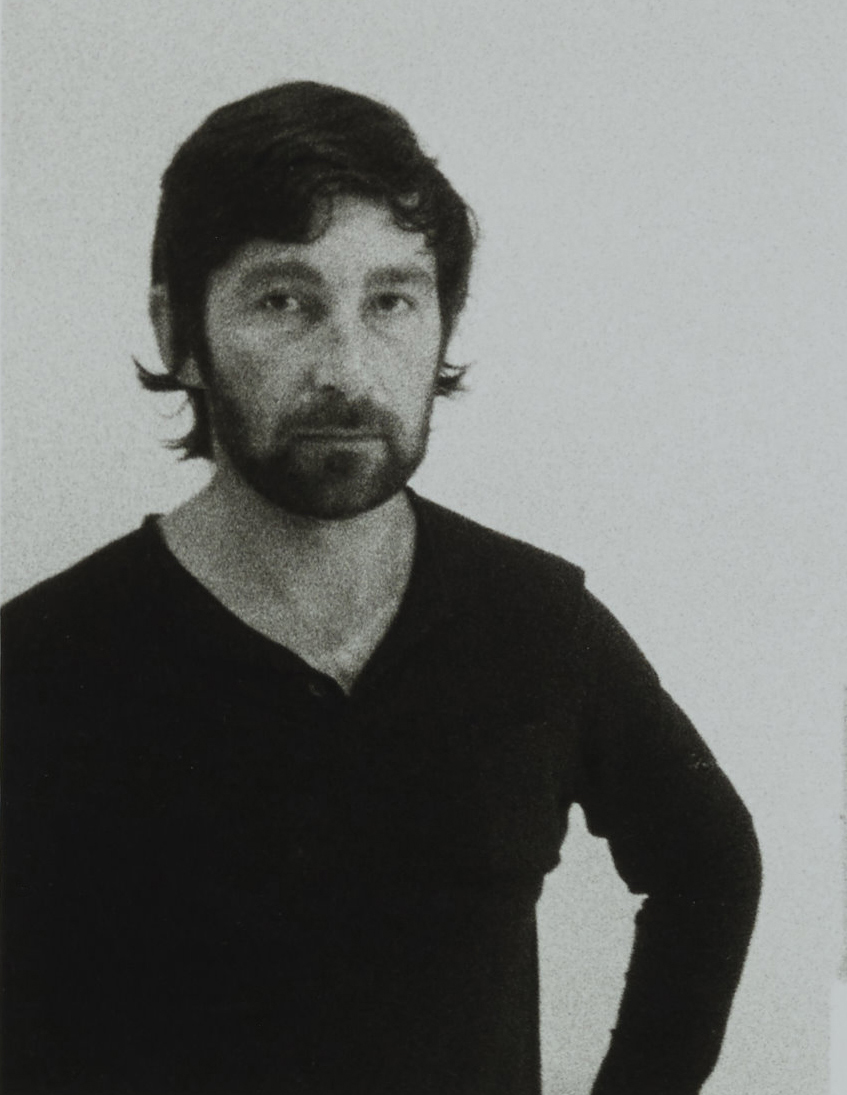
Keith Arnatt c. 1970

Keith Arnatt (1930–2008) was a British conceptual artist. As well as conceptual art his work is sometimes discussed in relation to land art, minimalism, and photography. He lived and worked in London, Liverpool, Yorkshire and Monmouthshire.

== Life and work ==
Arnatt was born in Oxford.

He had studied painting at Oxford School of Art in the early 1950s and later at the Royal Academy Schools in London. From 1962 he taught at Liverpool and then, until 1969, Manchester. At this time he was living in and working from a farmhouse on the Yorkshire/Lancashire border. In 1969 he moved to Tintern in Monmouthshire. Liverpool (the beach at Formby); the moors around his farmhouse in Todmorden, Yorkshire; and his garden surrounded by woodland in Tintern, are settings for works.

By the end of the 1960s Arnatt's work was associated with the new conceptual art movement. A number of writers connected conceptual art with a general reductionist tendency in contemporary art of the time using phrases like ‘dematerialization’ and referring to the influence of minimalism and in particular the influence of Robert Morris in relating the presentation of art objects to the contexts of their viewing in a way that sought to activate those contexts.

Arnatt took part in a number of influential exhibitions of conceptual art including 'Konzeption-Conception, Städtichen Museum, Leverkusen', 1969; 'Information', MoMA, New York, 1970; 'Umwelt-Akzente / Die Expansion der Kunst', Kunstkreis Monschau, 1970 and 'Art as Idea in England', CAYC (Centro de Arte y Comunicación), Buenos Aires, 1971.

Some works from this period, including Self-Burial in the version documenting the WDR televised Self-Burial (Television Interference Project) (1969), and Trouser-Word Piece (1972-89 version) are held in the Tate collection. MoMA, New York has an Art + Project authorised time slice of the work 1220400 - 0000000 (1970). The Henry Moore Institute in Yorkshire holds examples of early materials and the V&A Museum has examples of proposals. Some materials that Arnatt gave to Robert Smithson in the form of documentation of proposals were donated to LACMA, Los Angeles by Nancy Holt. Tate Archive has material relating to proposals by the artist including correspondence with the writer Barbara Reise. Other works, for example I have decided to go to the Tate Gallery next Friday (1971), and Art and Egocentricity – A Perlocutionary Act? (1971) were visual/textual hybrids and were intended to be realised in specific circumstances.

From the mid-1970s onwards The Visitors (1974-6), Walking the Dog (1976-9), Gardeners (1978-9), A.O.N.B. (1982-5) and series such as Miss Grace's Lane (1986-7) and Howler's Hill (1987-8) make directly realist evidential references in their uses of settings. Here, where Arnatt was using the camera in a first-order way and there has been some theorising over the extent of his influence on contemporary photographic practice, there still remains an overriding continuity in the form of analytic and self-disclosing interests in his work. In late series like Painter’s Cans (1990), Notes from Jo (1991–95), and Labels Borrowed/Stolen (1993–95) Arnatt continued to investigate objects with something very close to the type of manipulative detachment originally shown in early works.
