= Marc Hansen =

Marc Hansen may refer to:

- Marc Hansen (cartoonist), American cartoonist
- Marc Hansen (politician), Luxembourgish politician

== See also ==
- Mark Hansen (disambiguation)
