= Barbara Reise =

Barbara Reise (1940–1978) was an American art critic and historian. The final dozen years of her life were spent in the United Kingdom. She was closely linked to leaders of minimalism and conceptual art. Of the American minimalist artists, she wrote "One must think to get the full effects of their work, which unfolds over time in conceptual richness." She has been called "an inspirational figure in the movements of minimal and conceptual art in the 1960s and 1970s".

== Early life and education ==
Barbara Marie Reise was born on February 21, 1940, in Chicago, Illinois, to Eveline Laugman and Harold Reise. Barbara attended New Trier Highschool in Winnetka, Illinois.

At Wellesley College, Reise took a major in Art and Art History, from 1958 to 1962. Moving on to Columbia University, she received an M.A. in 1965 for a dissertation on Barnett Newman, supervised by Theodore Reff. At this period she studied with Robert Rosenblum of New York University. Another New York contact was Meyer Schapiro.

In 1966, on the Fulbright Program, Reise moved to England, and enrolled at the Courtauld Institute. She began a doctoral dissertation on Turner and Venice under Rudolf Wittkower, which she did not complete. According to John McEwen's obituary notice in Art Monthly, she had retraced all of J. M. W. Turner's Italian journeys.

== London and its art scene ==
Reise was one of the small group in London who worked for the reception of American conceptual artists, others being Lynda Morris and Anne Seymour. The gallerist and curator Seth Siegelaub was a correspondent and friend. She promoted ideas for exhibitions of contemporary American artists to Norbert Lynton, and had through Barnett Newman an introduction to E. J. Power, businessman with Murphy Radio and significant modern art collector. Her position as a leading contact for American artists in London in time was substantially taken over by Jack Wendler.

In London, Reise lived for a time in Belsize Park, at 10 Eton Garages. She then bought a house in Kentish Town, at 30 Alma Street, which she had renovated to a design by Rick Mather.

== Academic and activist ==
From around the beginning of 1968, Reise taught at Coventry School of Art. She had met Michael Sandle, who taught there until 1968 — she later thought the encounter was at a dinner given by E. J. Power, while he recalled it being at a Larry Bell exhibition. She had no particular rapport with the Principal there, David Bethel, who left the following year to go to Leicester Polytechnic, nor with Anthony Francis Hobson who lectured on history of art, as she told Michael Kitson; but the General Studies department headed by Hobson asked her that year to design a programme. The work involved her in contentious but constructive discussion with the nascent Art & Language group. Reise resigned her position at Coventry at the end of the 1972–3 academic year, and applied for other academic positions, but without success.

The Art Workers' Coalition (AWC) was set up in early 1969, to lobby for reform in art museums and galleries, following a protest by Takis. Reise was one of many artists and critics who gave the AWC public support. At the open hearing held by the AWC on 10 April 1969 at the School of Visual Arts, she read out a statement by Barnett Newman, not able to attend. It has been argued that conceptual artists took on the method of institutional critique from the AWC. In a 1971 article on exhibitions by Hans Haacke and Robert Morris, Reise criticised Thomas M. Messer, Director of the Solomon R. Guggenheim Museum. She compared unfavourably his attitude to public safety concerns that arose, to that of the Tate Museum. Her article contained an interview with the Guggenheim associate curator Edward Fry, dismissed as a result of the Haacke show cancellation, and then supported by the AWC.

== Later years in London ==
Reise ran seminars in London art college. Bobby Baker recorded the impact on her of two, a week apart, in November 1972, with a diary entry ("an incredible experience").

Reise attended the Mail Action performance on 5 April 1975 by Genesis P-Orridge, with Colin Naylor (1944–1992), Ian Breakwell and other "avant-gardistes".

== Last years and death ==
Reise had an exhibition catalogue for Sigmar Polke rejected. She turned the work into a series of three articles in Studio International. Keith West noted in 1977 that she was struggling with financial and drink problems. That year her participation as curator in a Carel Visser exhibition was turned down.

Barbara Reise died at home in January 1978. A coroner's inquest ruled that she had died between 16 and 25 January, and returned an open verdict. A physician she had consulted stated that she was an "episodic drinker". At the time of her death she was working with Colin Naylor on the stalled first issue of a new magazine, ArtstrA, to feature COUM Transmissions (Genesis P-Orridge and Cosey Fanni Tutti) and Philip Glass. John McEwen's obituary stated:

Barbara's legacy of accurate and often innovatory articles on some of the international avant-gardists of the day, her two or three ventures into reportage, is the evidence of a witness we can trust.

Barrie Cook was of the opinion that Reise was "ahead of her time", one reason for her relative isolation at Coventry.

== Critical views ==
Reise made an intervention in the debates on minimalism and conceptual art in an article "Greenberg and the Group: a retrospective view", published in Studio International. In defence of the artists, she took Clement Greenberg and his followers as a target. Alison Lee Bracker summed up Reise's issue with the associated theory of modernism as "Greenberg's faith in objective critical judgment within art history depended upon the critic's subjective version of that history".

"Greenberg and the Group" was understood to include also Jane Harrison Cone, Michael Fried, Rosalind Krauss and Sidney Tillim, who were not spared her strictures. Julia Bryan-Wilson points out the disrespect Greenberg was showing at the time for "lady art critics", in particular Lucy Lippard, and the emerging group of Krauss, Annette Michelson, Barbara Rose from 1965, and Amy Taubin, with Reise, as significant in the critical reception of minimalism.

The piece was well received by Alan Bowness, and Peter Townsend (1919–2006), editor of Studio International, commissioned two further articles. At this period Townsend was actively seeking out women contributors: besides Reise, Lynda Morris and Lippard, there were Dore Ashton, Rosetta Brookes, Suzi Gablik, Catherine Lampert, Jasia Reichardt, and Jeanne Siegel. Reise became a commissioning editor for Studio International, and the reputation of minimalist art rose in the United Kingdom.

On the staff of the magazine Charles Harrison, a colleague and sparring partner, disagreed with Reise's emphasis on subjectivity in judgements.

The article "Untitled 1969: a footnote on art and minimalist stylehood" by Reise in a minimalist art special issue of Studio International by Reise was important in establishing Sol LeWitt as a conceptual artist. It also argued against "minimal art" as a misnomer, introduced by Richard Wollheim in 1965. The article presented a group of five American minimalists, including LeWitt, in a positive light. In contrast, Reise selected five more artists also classified as minimalists, for denigration. She said of one of those, Robert Smithson:

Smithson's Non-Sites of photographs and material extractions from real-life stone quarries are consistently less interesting than stone quarries themselves.

In a 2014 interview, Nicholas Serota commented that the nascent view Reise developed, dividing off "conceptual artists" in the minimalist group, had some common ground with the demarcation used by the "Art & Language" group.

On the significance of the Yugoslav conceptual art of Raša Todosijević and Marina Abramović, primed by Todosijević from 1968, she insisted on its importance. She rejected the reasoning of Achille Bonito Oliva, that the Serb group at the Belgrade Student Center was "marginal" rather than "alternative", as ideologically constructed, and set up to diminish the value of non-Western art.

== Legacy ==
Barbara Reise left six filing cabinets of research notes, for example detailed accounts of performance art by Gilbert and George, and correspondence. Nicholas Serota had the Reise family lawyer, in London to deal with her estate, agree to a donation of this archive to the Tate Gallery. There it was catalogued by Adrian Glew. Material from the Reise archive is now posted on the Tate website.

A request from Jack Wendler to write Reise's biography was rejected because of animus against him on the part of her family. For related reasons, an effort in the 1990s by Wendler and Liam Gillick to republish writings by Reise failed.
