= God is Great (no. 2) =

God is Great No. 2
- Artist: John Latham
- Year: 1991
- Location: Tate Britain; London

God is Great #2 is a sculpture by the Zambian-born British artist John Latham. Created in 1991, the conceptual artwork featured copies of the Bible, Quran, and a volume of the Talmud, each cut in two and attached to a sheet of glass, giving the illusion of all three volumes being encased within the glass. Latham explained the work as referencing the common origin of Judaism, Christianity, and Islam.

In 2005 the sculpture was to be featured as part of a retrospective of Latham's work at the Tate Britain gallery in London. After the 7 July 2005 London bombings by Islamic militants, staff members at the gallery expressed concerns that Muslims offended by the work might carry out acts of violence at the gallery. Tate Britain decided not to include the piece in the exhibition. Latham was angered by the gallery's decision, requesting that they return the work to his possession. The controversy generated media interest and in November Tate Britain held a panel debate regarding the issue. The Tate's decision not to display the work was widely criticised, including by Muslim groups and commentators, who accused the gallery of promoting the idea that Muslims were fanatical, intolerant, and volatile.

== Background ==
God is Great (no. 2) was one of a series of artworks created by Latham which investigated relations between Judaism, Christianity, and Islam. It features a copy of the Qur'an, the Christian Bible, and a volume from the Talmud, all appearing as if they are embedded within a sheet of glass. This effect had been achieved by cutting each of the books in two and having each side glued to the glass.

Latham stated that "it shows that all religious teaching comes from the same source, whatever name you give to it". To The Independent he commented that the sculpture's "literal meaning" was "that all inspirational belief systems derive from a single source, represented by the glass, from which all utterances are drawn on a vast number of now numerate levels". The scholar of religion S. Brent Plate thought that there was an "interpretative ambiguity" to the work, in that the viewer is left to decide for themselves whether it is "critical or accepting" of the religious traditions featured.

In the years after it had been made, the work was part of a series that had gone on display at Oxford's Museum of Modern Art, London's Lisson gallery and at the Venice Biennale.

== Tate Britain debate ==
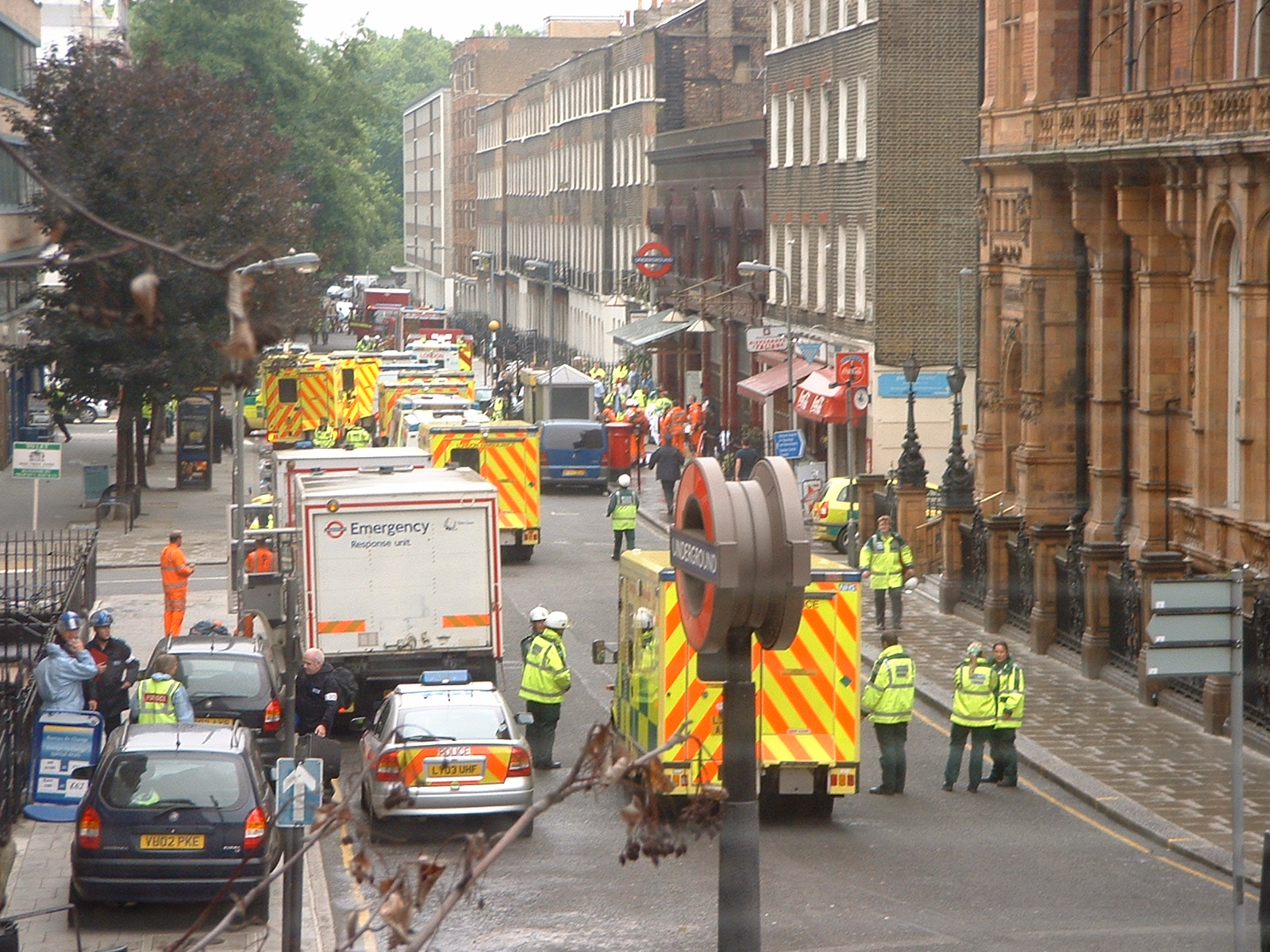
Tate Britain's decision not to include the artwork in an exhibit was based on the 7 July 2005 London bombings (emergency crews pictured)

The Tate Britain gallery in London held a retrospective of the artist's work, John Latham in Focus, between September 2005 and February 2006. In the wake of the 7 July 2005 bombings on the London transport system, carried out by Islamic militants, Tate Britain made the decision not to include God is Great (no. 2) in the exhibition, as they had originally planned. The gallery were aware that the act of cutting the sacred texts in two might cause offense to some members of these religious groups, although the gallery's director, Stephen Deuchar, stated that the decision was made not out of fear of offending anyone, but out of fear that someone who had been offended might respond violently. Following on from the June bombings, gallery staff had expressed concern that they might be attacked because of the artwork.

Deuchar added that it was "a very difficult decision, but we made it due to the exceptional circumstances of this summer and in the light of opinions that we value regarding religious sensitivities." The Tate had contacted Islamic scholars who had stated that the work could be seen as an abuse of the Quran, although the gallery had not consulted either the Metropolitan Police or the Muslim Council of Britain before making their decision. A notice was placed in the exhibit explaining that God is Great (no. 2) had been omitted.

The incident followed on from several religious controversies that took place in Britain during the preceding year, including Christian demonstrations against Jerry Springer: The Opera and Sikh demonstrations against the play Behzti, which eventually resulted in the latter's cancellation by the Birmingham Repertory Theatre.

=== Response ===
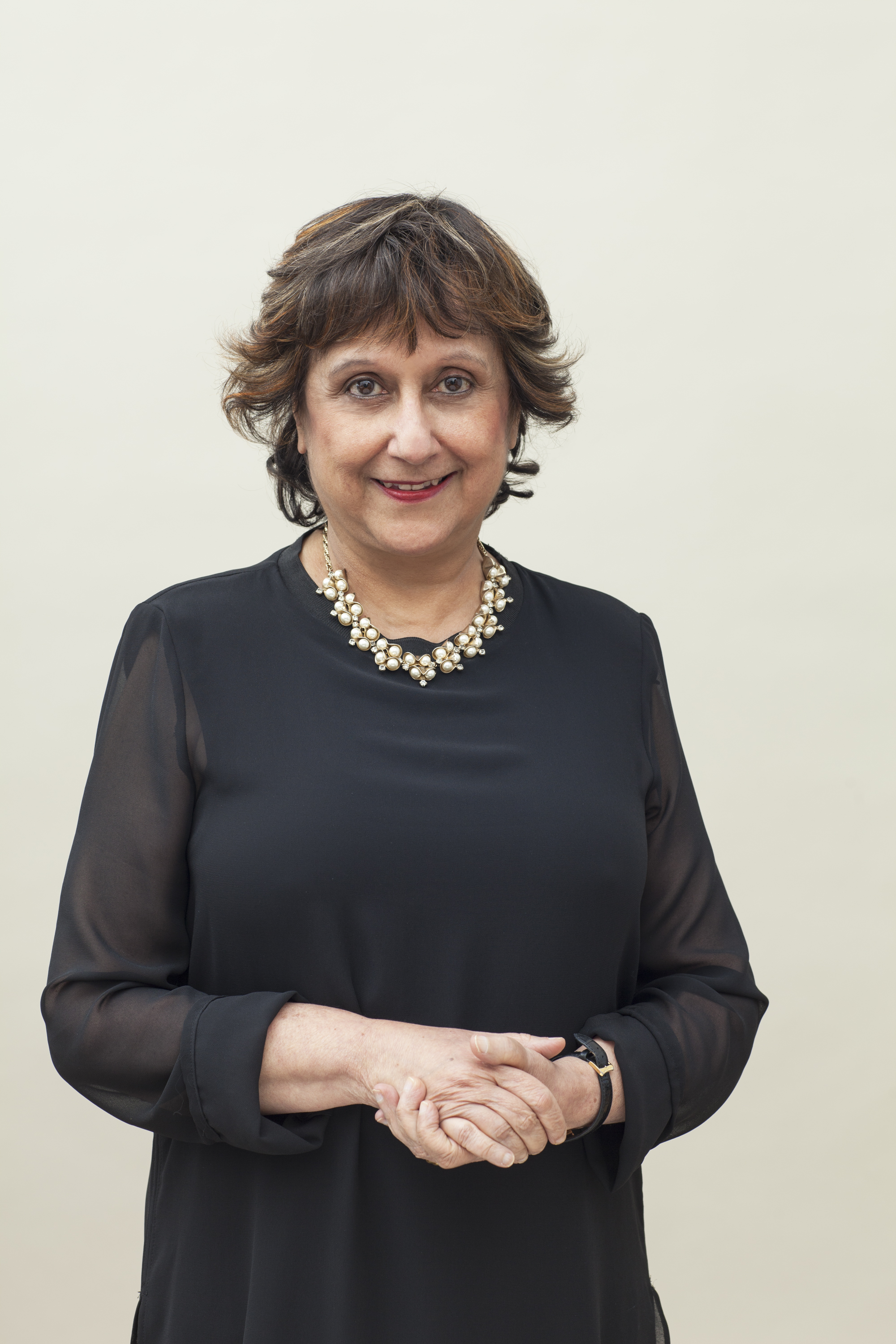
British Muslim commentator Yasmin Alibhai-Brown criticised the Tate's decision to withdraw the work from display, arguing that it reflected the assumption that all Muslims were intolerant and volatile

Latham was angered by the Tate's decision: "Tate Britain has shown cowardice over this . . . it isn't even a gesture as strong as censorship, just a loss of nerve." In his view, the artwork was "not offensive to anybody" and not "anti-Muslim". He wrote to the gallery stating that if they were not going to display the artwork then they should relinquish possession and return it to him, although admitted that he thought it unlikely that they would do so. The Tate conceded that in its notice in the gallery, it would state that they had removed the piece "without the consent" of the artist. Latham died on 1 January 2006, before the retrospective exhibition had finished.

The British media soon picked on the story and various newspaper columns were devoted to it. The civil rights advocacy group Liberty also criticised the gallery's decision; its director, Shami Chakrabarti, expressed concern at the "signal this sends at a time when we see free speech quite significantly under threat" in Britain. The Secretary of the Muslim Council of Britain, Iqbal Sacranie, stated that he was unaware of any Muslim group that had protested against the display of the artwork, but that he respected the Tate's decision if they felt it to be "deeply offensive to the believers of the three religions". The Council also stated that it had wished that the Tate had consulted them before making the decision, adding that "sometimes presumptions are incorrectly made about what is unacceptable to Muslims and this can be counter-productive."

Tate Britain organised a panel to debate the issue in November, titled "Sacred, Sacrosanct or Just Art?: The Politics and Place of Art in the Public Arena". One of those on the panel was the commentator Yasmin Alibhai-Brown. She noted that the debate was "more interesting and vital than that tired old match between absolutist libertarians and those who advocate censorship." In her view, the Tate's decision was wrong, but understandable. She expressed frustration that the Tate's decision displayed an attitude that assumed Muslims to be fanatical and intolerant, and articulated the view that the millions of "liberal, secular, and open minded" Muslims around the world were "offended by the decision that assumed we are all volatile and unlikely to understand such works." As a Muslim, she regarded the sculpture itself as "an extraordinary representation of devout belief in one God and universe".

Another member of the panel was the commentator Anthony Julius. Regarding the artwork itself, he thought it "uninformed", believing that it did not reflect "any particularly intimate understanding of the traditions that it purports to represent." Specifically, he thought it confused to have a whole copy of the Quran coupled with only part of the Talmud, which he thought reflected ignorance as to the nature of Jewish scripture and its relationship with Islamic text. He opposed the Tate's decision to remove the artwork from display, suggesting that the possibility of the sculpture being damaged was minimal, the threat to gallery visitors "exceptionally unlikely", and that if needed, additional security could have been employed. He further suggested that the Tate should have consulted Latham before making the decision, because the artist—although no longer the legal owner of the piece—should remain in control of "the integrity of the work".

== See also ==
- Piss Christ
