= Geoffrey Latham =

English cricketer and colonial administrator

Personal information
- Full name: Geoffrey Chitty Latham
- Born: 15 March 1887; Shanghai, Jiangsu, China
- Died: 23 September 1980 (aged 93); Farnham, Surrey, England
- Batting: Right-handed
- Relatives: Thomas Latham (father)

Domestic team information
- Years: Team
- 1907: Oxford University

Career statistics
Competition	First-class
Matches	1
Runs scored	25
Batting average	12.50
100s/50s	–/–
Top score	22
Catches/stumpings	1/–
- Source: Cricinfo, 24 June 2020

Geoffrey Chitty Latham (15 March 1887 – 23 September 1980) was an English first-class cricketer and colonial administrator.

The son of the cricketer and judge Thomas Latham, he was born in China in March 1887. He was educated at Winchester College, before going up to Magdalen College, Oxford. While studying at Oxford, he made a single appearance in first-class cricket for Oxford University against Sussex at Eastbourne in 1907. Batting twice in the match, he was run out for 22 runs in the Oxford first innings, while in their second innings he was dismissed for 3 runs by George Cox.

After graduating from Oxford, Latham joined the Colonial Service in 1910. During the First World War he was a lieutenant in the Northern Rhodesia Police and was decorated by France with the Légion d'honneur in August 1917. He was appointed the first inspector of schools in Northern Rhodesia in 1920. In April 1924, Latham was made director of the newly created sub-department for native education in Northern Rhodesia. Despite his opposition to the introduction of film to native Rhodesians, in case it became politicized as it had in British India, Latham changed his stance in the early 1930s in an effort to expand and improve native education. Latham died at Waverley Abbey House near Farnham in September 1980. His son was the artist John Latham.
