= Artist Placement Group =

The Artist Placement Group (APG) was conceived by Barbara Steveni in London in 1965, and established in 1966 as an artist-run organisation seeking to refocus art outside the gallery, predominantly through attaching an artist in a business or governmental context for a period of time. Then the participating artists would try to create and organize exhibitions of work related to those new experiences.

Industrial placements included the British Steel Corporation and Ocean Fleets Ltd., and governmental placements included the Department of the Environment, the Scottish Office and the Department for Health and Social Security. As well as these placements, the organisation exhibited in galleries - for example in INN70 at the Hayward Gallery in London, in 1971 and other venues including a retrospective review at Whitechapel Art Gallery in 1977 and at documenta 6 in the same year.

Among the participants were Barbara Steveni, John Latham, Maurice Agis, Joseph Beuys, Ian Breakwell, Stuart Brisley, Hugh Davies, Andrew Dipper, Barry Flanagan, David Hall, Ian Macdonald Munro, Yoko Ono, Anna Ridley, Jeffrey Shaw, David Toop, and the Fluxus Group.

After 1989 the organisation became known as Organisation and Imagination (O+I). In 2004 the Tate Archive in London purchased the APG records. Co-founder John Latham died shortly after, in 2006.

In 2012 Raven Row Gallery, London, revisited APG's early years by staging a major retrospective of work carried out including examples of some of its placements together with related documentation much of it loaned by the Tate. A further retrospective occurred in 2015 at Kunstraum Kreuzberg/Bethanien in Berlin, forming the basis for a further exhibition at Summerhall, Edinburgh in 2016.
