= Mark B. N. Hansen =

American media and literature scholar

- Born: 1965 (age 60–61)
- Occupation: James B. Duke Distinguished Professor at Duke University

Education
- Education: New York University (BA); University of Konstanz (Fulbright) University of California, Irvine (MA, PhD)

Philosophical work
- School: Phenomenology, Media Studies
- Institutions: Duke University; Princeton University; The University of Chicago; Texas State University

Mark Boris Nicola Hansen (born 2 August 1965) is an American literary scholar and media theorist. His work focuses on the way technology alters the fabric of human agency and social life. Hansen is currently the James B. Duke Distinguished Professor of Literature and Chair of the Program in Literature at the Trinity College of Arts and Sciences at Duke University.

== Early life and academic background ==
Mark Hansen studied French and Comparative Literature at New York University from 1984 to 1987. He was awarded a Fulbright Full Scholarship to study at the University of Konstanz from 1990 to 1991. In 1994, he received his Ph.D. in Comparative Literature from the University of California, Irvine, with the dissertation titled From Heidegger to Horror: The Defiguration of the Machine in Romantic Literature and Cultural Theory.

Hansen has taught at Princeton University, the University of Chicago, and Texas State University. He is currently the James B. Duke Distinguished Professor of Literature and Chair of the Program in Literature at Duke University in Durham, North Carolina.

== Notable Work ==
In his first book, Embodying Technesis: Technology beyond Writing (2000), Hansen examines the theoretical approach to technology by influential cultural-philosophical authors of the 20th century, namely Martin Heidegger, Jacques Derrida, Sigmund Freud, Jacques Lacan, Michel Foucault, Gilles Deleuze, and Félix Guattari. He identifies a theoretical trend toward reducing the phenomenon of technology to the concept of the machine. However, this ultimately misinterprets technology as essentially "discursive," thus underestimating its material power and inherent dynamics. He names this reductive strategy—in analogy to Alice Jardine's concept of gynesis—technesis, or "putting-into-discourse of technology." Drawing on Walter Benjamin and neuroscientific theses, Hansen strives to develop a theory that can do justice to the cultural power of technology in its physical presence.

This project is expanded upon in New Philosophy for New Media (2004) with regard to digital media. Referencing the philosophy of Henri Bergson, the neuroscientific concept of embodiment, and the revision of cybernetics by Donald MacCrimmon MacKay and Raymond Ruyer, he attempts to redefine the relationship between humans and technical media in the digital age. The digital image is no longer to be understood as an independent object, but merely as a process that presupposes both an interface and an embodied recipient. Accordingly, he rejects the theory of a “disembodiment” of humans triggered by the digital media revolution. Rather, it is through digital media that the affective-physical “underside” of every act of perception becomes accessible to experience, which can be seen as an active expansion of the affective potential of the human body. The art of the new media, among others. by Jeffrey Shaw, Robert Lazzarini and Bill Viola, Hansen analyzes in detail as a testing ground for such an affective-physical extension of the recipient.

In Bodies in Code (2006), Hansen expands this perspective by drawing on Maurice Merleau-Ponty's phenomenology of the body. His most recent book, Feed-Forward: On the Future of Twenty-First-Century Media (2014) was described by Choice Magazine as "A major contribution to the field" and a "potentially canonic book for specialists in philosophy, ethics, and media studies."

== Response ==
Media scholar Marie-Luise Angerer criticizes Hansen's New Philosophy for New Media based on Michel Foucault's discourse analysis. She argues that the media-induced modification of the affective body is by no means to be understood as a liberation, but rather as a symptom of a change in the dominant apparatus of power. This apparatus now focuses less on the desire of the subject and more on the affect of the organism.

== Awards ==
Hansen has been awarded fellowships from the National Humanities Center (2014–15), IKKM Weimar (2015–16), and the Franklin Humanities Institute (2009–10). He received the Ars Electronica Book Prize for his book Bodies in Code (2008).

== Publications ==
- Mark B. N. Hansen: Embodying Technesis: Technology Beyond Writing. Science and Literature Series, University of Michigan, 2000.
- Mark B. N. Hansen: New Philosophy for New Media. MIT, 2004.
- Mark Hansen / Bruce Clarke: Emergence and Embodiment: New Essays on Second-Order Systems Theory. Duke University Press, 2005.
- Mark B. N. Hansen / Taylor Carman: The Cambridge Companion to Merleau-Ponty. Cambridge University Press, 2005.
- Mark B. N. Hansen: Bodies in Code: Interfaces with New Media. Routledge, 2006.
- Mark B. N. Hansen: Feed Forward: On the Future of 21st Century Media: University of Chicago Press, 2014.
