= Stuart Brisley =

British artist (born 1933)

- Born: 1933 (age 92–93); Haslemere, Surrey, England
- Education: Guildford School of Art; Royal College of Art; Akademie der Bildenden Künste, Munich, Germany; Florida State University, Tallahassee, Florida
- Known for: performance art; sculpture; installation
- Website: www.stuartbrisley.com

Stuart Brisley (born 1933) is a British artist.

== Education ==
Brisley studied at Guildford School of Art from 1949 to 1954 and at the Royal College of Art from 1956 to 1959. In 1959–60 he attended the Akademie der Bildenden Künste in Munich, Germany, and from 1960 to 1962 studied at Florida State University in Tallahassee, Florida, in the United States.

== Career ==
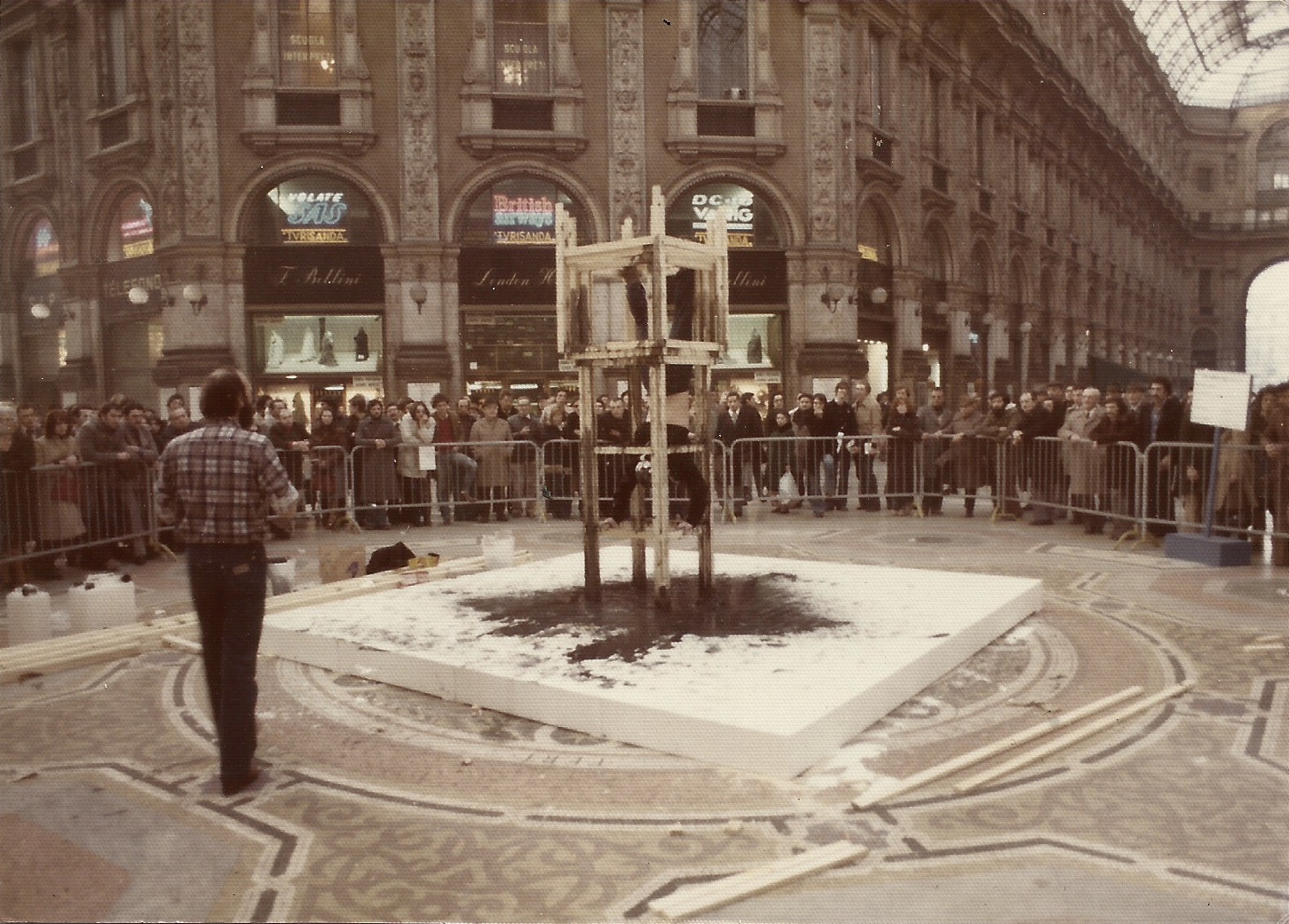
A performance by Stuart Brisley at the Galleria Vittorio Emanuele II in Milan, Italy. The performance was part of the 1976 exhibition Arte Inglese Oggi with over 50 British artists participating

In 1968 he took part in the occupation of Hornsey College of Art by staff and students, the "Hornsey sit-in".

From the 1960s and to the early 1980s he was active as a performance artist; his works were inspired by Marxist political ideas, and frequently used extended duration as an aspect of the performance. In the 1980s he turned to sculpture and installation art.

After a long academic career, Brisley is a Professor Emeritus of the Slade School of Fine Art.
