= Sarah Kenderdine =

New Zealand archaeologist

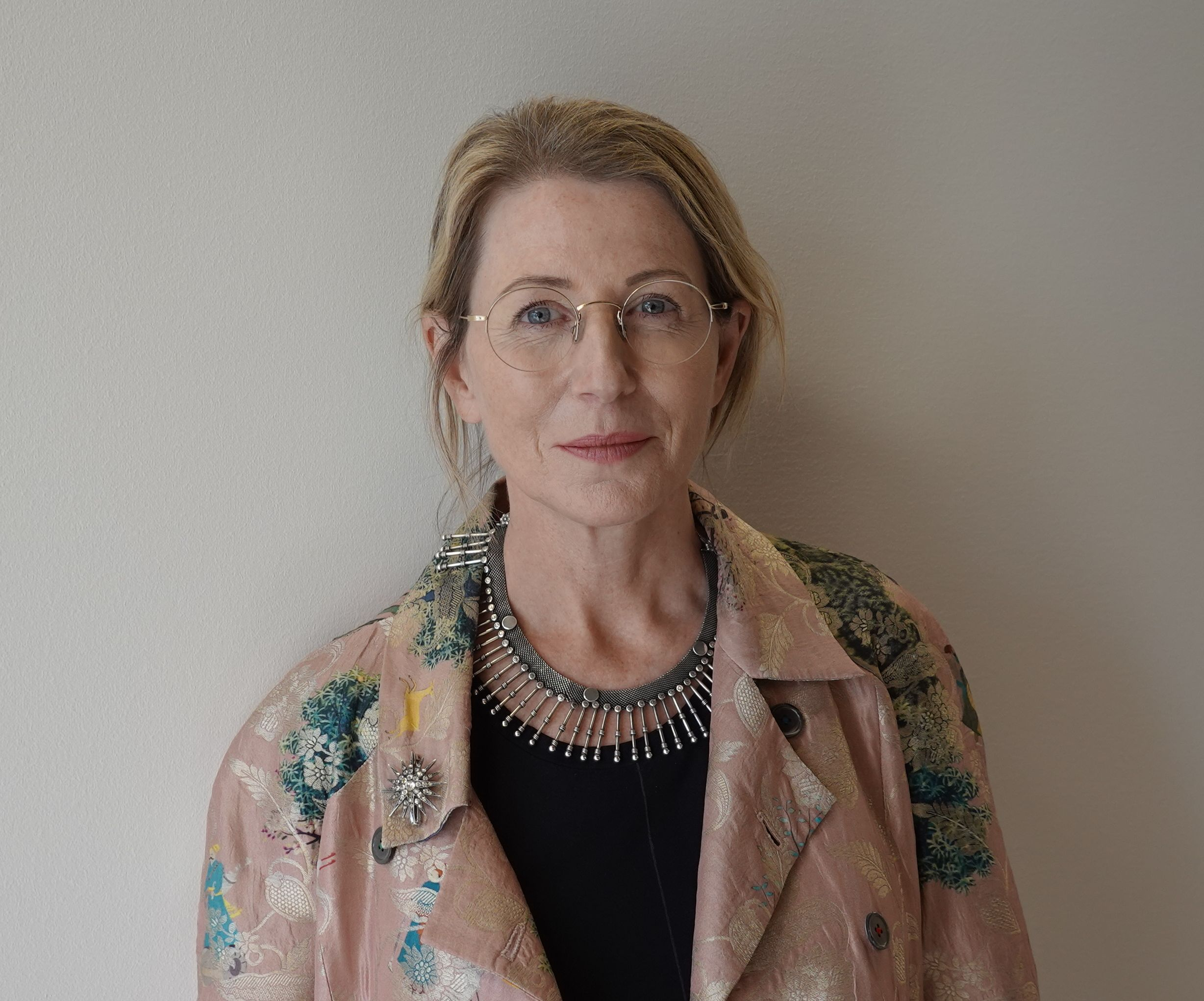
Sarah Kenderdine 2020 in Zurich.

Sarah Kenderdine is a New Zealand museologist. She has been a professor of Digital Museology at the École polytechnique fédérale de Lausanne (EPFL), Switzerland, since 2017. She leads the laboratory for experimental museology (eM+), exploring the convergence of aesthetic practice, visual analytics and cultural data. Kenderdine develops interactive and immersive experiences for museums and galleries, often employing interactive cinema and augmented reality. She is a New Zealander and was born on 2 January 1966 in Sydney.

== Career ==
Kenderdine holds a variety of roles at UNSW. In addition to her professorship and her position with the Expanded Perception and Interaction Centre, she is deputy director of the National Institute for Experimental Arts (NIEA); director of the Laboratory for Innovation in Galleries, Libraries, Archives and Museums (iGLAM); and an associate director of the iCinema Research Centre. She has also been the head of special projects for Museum Victoria since 2003, and is the director of research at the Applied Laboratory for Interactive Visualization and Embodiment at the City University of Hong Kong.

She is a maritime archaeologist and worked as a curator at the Western Australian Maritime Museum from 1994–1997. In her first two years there, she designed and built its website, one of the world’s earliest museum sites. She later designed networks and websites for Museums Australia, for the Association of Southeast Asian Nations and, during the 2000 Summer Olympics, for Intel’s Olympic Games projects. From 1998–2003, she was the creative director of special projects at the Powerhouse Museum in Sydney.

Between 2013 and 2017, she was a professor at the UNSW Art & Design in Sydney, Australia, and the director of visualisation for the university's transdisciplinary Expanded Perception and Interaction Centre.

Kenderdine has produced more than 70 exhibitions and installations for museums worldwide and has 35 peer-reviewed publications, including two books. She has created several interactive installations at UNESCO World Heritage Sites, including Angkor Wat; Hampi, India; Olympia, Greece; and numerous sites in Turkey. From 2012–2015, in collaboration with the Dunhuang Research Academy in Dunhuang, China, she directed Pure Land: Inside the Mogao Grottoes at Dunhuang, Pure Land Augmented Reality Edition, Pure Land Henqin and Pure Land UnWired. Another project, ECloud WW1, commissioned in 2012 for Europeana, allows interactive browsing of cultural data from World War I.

She also conceived and curated Kaladham/PLACE-Hampi, a permanent museum in Vijayanagar, India, inaugurated in November 2012, and co-directed two installations based on the "Pacifying the South China Sea" scroll, which was displayed at the Hong Kong Maritime Museum in 2013. In 2014, she completed Museum Victoria’s data browser for 100,000 objects: a 360-degree, 3D interactive installation in the museum's galleries.

Kenderdine has served on editorial and advisory boards for SAGE Publications' Big Data & Society, Elsevier's Journal of Cultural Heritage, and the International Conference on Information Visualisation.

== Awards ==
In 2013, for her work on the Kaladham/PLACE-Hampi museum, Kenderdine won the ICOM Australia Award from the International Council of Museums, as well as the Australian Arts in Asia Innovation Award. That same year, she won the Tartessos Award for contributions to virtual archaeology, and an International Congress & Iméra Foundation Fellowship from Aix-Marseille University.

In 2014, she won the Council for the Humanities, Arts and Social Sciences' Prize for Distinctive Work for the Pure Land projects, and in 2015, she was a Rankin Scholar-in-Residence at Drexel University.

She was elected a corresponding fellow of the British Academy in 2021.
