= Ian Breakwell =

British artist (1943–2005)

Ian Breakwell (26 May 1943 – 14 October 2005) was a British artist, active as a diarist, a draughtsman, a film-maker, a painter, a photographer and a print-maker.

== Life ==
Breakwell was born on 26 May 1943 in Long Eaton, in Derbyshire. From 1961 to 1965 he attended the Derby College of Art, and then moved to London.

== Work ==
Breakwell was part of the Artist Placement Group in the 1970s, and was for a time placed in the Department of Health and Social Security. He was sent to work in the psychiatric hospitals of Broadmoor in Berkshire and Rampton in Nottinghamshire; his film The Institution, made in 1978 with Kevin Coyne, is based on these experiences.

He died in London on 14 October 2005.

The Tate Archive holds a collection of his personal papers, correspondence, photographs and notebooks including documentation of 'The Institution' performances with Kevin Coyne.

== Exhibitions ==
Breakwell's principal exhibitions include:

- Evidence. Greenwich Theatre Art Gallery, London, 1973
- Continuous Diary (travelling exhibition). Arnolfini Gallery, Bristol, 1977
- Circus. Third Eye Centre, Glasgow, 1978
- 120 Days. Tate Gallery, London, 1982
- Echoes. Laing Art Gallery, Newcastle-upon-Tyne, 1988
- Free Range, Survey of Ian Breakwell's publications 1964-1993 (travelling exhibition). Victoria and Albert Museum, London, 1993
- Drawing across Boundaries. Loughborough University School of Art and Design, 1998
- Textworks 1966-1999. Loughborough University Gallery, 1999
- The Other Side. The De La Warr Pavilion, Bexhill-on-Sea, 2002
- Ian Breakwell: the Elusive State of Happiness (retrospective). Quad Gallery, Derby, 2010 (Note: 'The Elusive State of Happiness' is a work from 1979, now in the collection of Arts Council England.)
- Ian Breakwell: Keep Things As They Are (retrospective). De La Warr Pavilion, Bexhill-on-Sea, 6 October 2012 – 13 January 2013.
