= John Latham (artist) =

Northern Rhodesian-born British conceptual artist

- John Latham in 1968
- Born: John Aubrey Clarendon Latham; 23 February 1921; Livingstone, Northern Rhodesia (now Maramba, Zambia)
- Died: 1 January 2006 (aged 84); London, England
- Education: Chelsea College of Art and Design
- Known for: Painting, Sculpture
- Movement: Conceptual art

John Aubrey Clarendon Latham (23 February 1921 – 1 January 2006) was an English conceptual artist born in Northern Rhodesia.

== Life and work ==
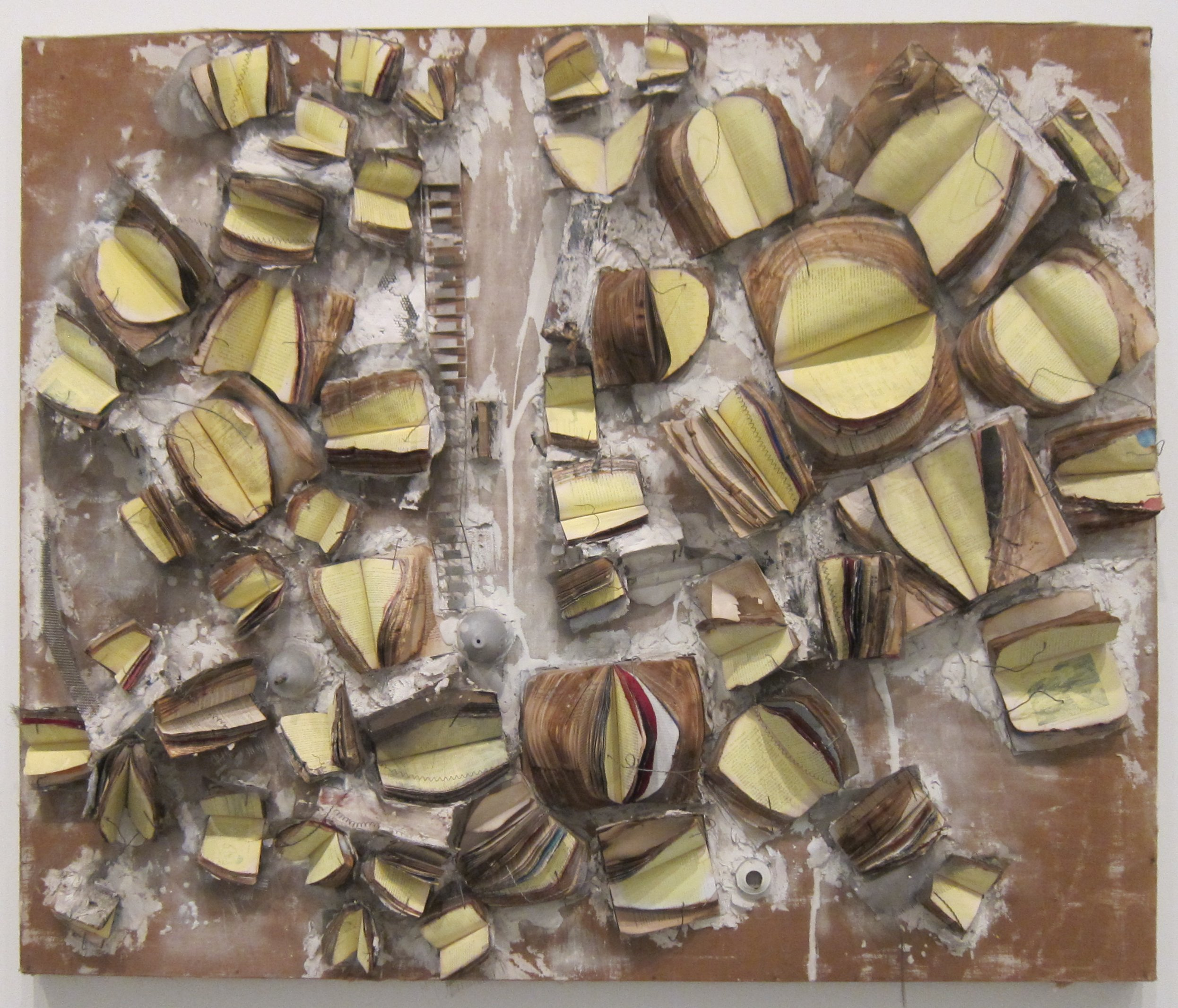
Film Star, 1960, Tate Modern

Latham was born in Northern Rhodesia to the cricketer and colonial administrator Geoffrey Latham. He was educated in England at Winchester College. In the Second World War he commanded a motor torpedo boat in the Royal Naval Volunteer Reserve. After the war he studied art, first at the Regent Street Polytechnic and then at the Chelsea College of Art and Design. He married fellow artist and collaborator Barbara Steveni in Westminster in 1951.

The spray can became Latham's primary medium, as can be seen in Man Caught Up with a Yellow Object (oil painting, 1954) in the Tate Gallery collection. In addition to spray paint, Latham tore, sawed, chewed and burnt books to create collage material for his work, such as Film Star (1960).

Latham's event-based art was influential in performance art. He worked with the Eventstructure Research Group (ERG), a performance art collective known for their temporary public art installations, for which Latham coined the word 'eventstructure' to describe "the relationship between structures (spatial and static) and events (dynamic and temporary)". In 1966, he took part in the Destruction in Art Symposium in London led by Gustav Metzger along with Fluxus artists such as Yoko Ono, Wolf Vostell and Al Hansen.

His "skoob" ("books" written backwards) works using books or materials derived from them had the power to shock. He moved from collages to towers of books which he then burnt, awakening uncomfortable echoes of the Nazi regime's public burning of banned books.

His Niddrie Woman (1977) was a contribution on the theme of Urban Renewal produced within the context of the Artist Placement Group's association with the Scottish Office.

From 1983 Latham lived and worked at his house, Flat Time House in Peckham. In 1991 he produced God is Great (no. 2), a conceptual artwork featuring copies of the Bible, Quran, and a volume of the Talmud, each cut in two and attached to a sheet of glass. In 2005 Tate Britain held an exhibition of Latham's work.

Latham died at Kings College Hospital, Camberwell, on 1 January 2006.

In 2010 John Latham: Canvas Events was published by Ridinghouse.

In 2016 the Henry Moore Institute presented A Lesson in Sculpture with John Latham, an exhibition addressing Latham's visionary contribution to the study of sculpture, bringing sixteen works by Latham, spanning 1958 to 2005, into conversation with sixteen sculptures by artists working across the twentieth and twenty-first centuries.

Like Latham, members of the rock band Pink Floyd attended Regent Street Polytechnic. In 2016 Pink Floyd released their collection of rare and unreleased recorded early material in the box set The Early Years 1965–1972. On the second CD of the collection is an extended instrumental improvisation, similar to that of the middle section of their performances of "Interstellar Overdrive", which were recorded in 1967 as a soundtrack for Latham's 1962 film Speak. The piece is split across nine tracks on the CD.

In 2017, Latham's work featured in the main exhibition of the 57th Venice Biennale, Viva Arte Viva.

== Sources ==
- Hamilton, R. (1986) John Latham. In: Lisson Gallery (1987) John Latham: Early Works. London: Lisson Gallery.
