= Halliday =

Halliday or Haliday is a surname. Notable people with the surname include:

- Alexander Henry Haliday (1807–1870), Irish entomologist
- Andrew Halliday (journalist) (1830–1877), British journalist and dramatist
- Andrew Halliday (physician) (1782–1839), Scottish physician, reformer, and writer
- Andy Halliday (born 1991), Scottish footballer
- Billy Halliday (1906–1989), Scottish footballer
- Brad Halliday (born 1995), English professional footballer
- Brett Halliday (1904–1977), pen name of American mystery author Davis Dresser
- Bruce Halliday (footballer) (born 1961), English footballer
- Bryant Haliday (1928–1996), American actor
- Charles Haliday (1789–1866), Irish historian and antiquary
- Dave Halliday (1901–1970), Scottish footballer
- David Halliday (physicist) (1916–2010), American physicist and textbook author
- Denis Halliday (born c. 1941), former United Nations Humanitarian Co-ordinator in Iraq
- Ebby Halliday (1911–2015), American realtor
- Edward Halliday (1902–1994), British painter
- Eugene Halliday (1911–1987), artist, philosopher and spiritual teacher
- F. E. Halliday (1903–1982), English academic and author
- Fred Halliday (1946–2010), Middle East scholar
- Fred Halliday (footballer) (1880–1953), English footballer
- Frederick James Halliday (1806–1901), first lieutenant-governor of Bengal
- Harry Halliday (cricketer, born 1920) (1920–1967), English cricketer
- Harry Halliday (cricketer, born 1855) (1855–1922), New Zealand cricketer
- Henry Halliday (1945–2022) Paediatrician and neonatologist
- Jack Halliday (1926–2000), American football player
- James Halliday (Canadian politician) (1845–1921), in the Canadian House of Commons from 1901 to 1904
- James Halliday (weightlifter) (1918–2007), British weightlifter
- James Halliday (wine) (born 1938), Australian wine critic and writer
- Jessica Halliday, New Zealand architectural historian
- Jimmy Halliday (1927–2013), leader of the Scottish National Party (1956–1960)
- John Halliday (actor) (1880–1947), American actor
- John Halliday (ophthalmologist) (1871–1946), Australian doctor
- Jon Halliday (born 1939), Irish historian and co-author of the book Mao: the Unknown Story
- Lee Halliday (1927–2023), American singer, dancer, and record producer
- Lin Halliday (1936–2000), American saxophonist
- Matt Halliday (born 1979), New Zealand race car driver
- Margaret Halliday (born 1956), New Zealand-Australian motorsport racer
- Mark Halliday (born 1949), American poet
- Martin Halliday (1926–2008), British neurophysiologist
- Michael Halliday (disambiguation)
- Nicholas Halliday (born 1999), Hong Kong sailor
- Robin Halliday Macartney (1911–1973), British architect, painter and illustrator
- Simon Halliday (Suffolk cricketer) (born 1958), English cricketer
- Simon Halliday (born 1960), English rugby union player and cricketer
- Thomas Halliday (writer), British palaeobiologist and author
- Tommy Halliday (born 1940), Scottish football player
- Toni Halliday (born 1964), English vocalist, lyricist and occasional guitarist of the band Curve
- William Reginald Halliday (1886–1966), historian and archaeologist

== See also ==
- Halladay
- Hallyday
- Andrew Smith Hallidie (1836–1900), promoter of San Francisco's first cable car system and California bridge builder
