= Holliday =

Holliday may refer to:

== Places in the United States ==
- Holliday, Missouri, a village
- Holliday, Pennsylvania, an unincorporated community
- Holliday, Texas, a city
- Holliday Creek (Missouri)
- Holliday Creek (Wichita River tributary), Texas

== People ==
- Holliday (name), a list of people with the surname or given name Holliday or Hollyday

== See also ==
- Halliday
- Holiday (disambiguation)
