= Holliday (name) =

Holliday is both a surname and a given name. Notable people with the name Holliday or Hollyday include:

== Surname ==
- Charles O. Holliday (born 1948), American businessman
- Christopher Hollyday (born 1970), American jazz alto saxophonist
- Cyrus K. Holliday (1826–1900), co-founder of Topeka, Kansas
- D. Van Holliday (1940–2010), American physicist
- David Holliday (1937–1999), American singer/actor & voice actor
- Doc Holliday (announcer), American radio personality
- Doc Holliday (1851–1887), American gambler, gunfighter, and dentist
- Ethan Holliday (born 2007), American baseball player
- Frank Holliday (born 1957), American painter
- Fred Holliday (disambiguation)
- Frederick W. M. Holliday (1828–1899), Governor of Virginia from 1878 to 1882
- George Holliday (disambiguation)
- Guy T. O. Hollyday (1893–1991), American businessman, head of the Federal Housing Administration from 1953 to 1954
- J. S. Holliday (1924–2006), American historian and author of major book on the California Gold Rush
- Jackson Holliday (born 2003), American baseball player
- James Holliday (politician) (1818–1851), American lawyer
- Jennifer Holliday (born 1960), American singer
- Jessie Holliday (1884–1915), English artist
- John Holliday (pioneer), early American pioneer of Western Virginia (modern West Virginia)
- Johnny Holliday (born 1937), American radio and TV sports-caster
- Josh Holliday (born 1976), American college baseball coach
- Judy Holliday (1921–1965), American actress
- William Holliday (born 2002), Infamous product design teacher of immense strength and power
- Leonard Holliday (c. 1550 – 1612), Lord Mayor of London
- Sister Mary Melanie Holliday (1850–1939), American Catholic nun
- Matt Holliday (born 1980), American baseball player
- Michael Holliday (1924–1963), British singer
- Polly Holliday (1937–2025), American actress
- Robert Holliday (1933–2014), American politician
- Robert Cortes Holliday (1880–1947), American writer and book editor
- Robin Holliday (1932–2014), English geneticist
- Sie Holliday (died 2006), American radio broadcaster
- Tess Holliday (born 1985), American plus-size model (professional name)
- Tom Holliday, multiple people
- Trindon Holliday (born 1986), American football player
- Vonnie Holliday (born 1975), American football player
- Captain Will Hollyday (died 1697), English military captain and highwayman

== Given name ==
- Holliday Grainger (born 1988), British actress
- Holliday Bickerstaffe Kendall (1844–1919), Primitive Methodist minister

== Fictional characters ==
- Luke Holliday, a character in the Netflix series 13 Reasons Why
- Holiday "Holly" Golightly, a character in the novella Breakfast at Tiffany's
- Holliday, a character in Deadlock (video game)

== See also ==
- Holiday (surname)
