= Holiday (disambiguation) =

A holiday is a day of observance.

Holiday(s) or The Holiday(s) commonly refers to:

- Holiday (travel) (British English) or vacation (American English), a trip or leave of absence for the purpose of recreation or rest
- Annual leave, time off from a job
- Christmas and holiday season or "the holidays", an annual festive period that surrounds Christmas and various other holidays

Holiday(s) or The Holiday(s) may also refer to:

== Places ==
- Holiday, Florida, U.S., a census-designated place
- Holiday, a community in Zorra, Ontario, Canada

== People ==
- Holiday (surname)
- Holiday Reinhorn (born 1964), American fiction writer

== Arts, entertainment, and media ==
=== Film ===
- Holiday (1930 film), an adaptation of Philip Barry's play (see below), starring Ann Harding and Mary Astor
- Holiday (1931 film), a French film directed by Robert Boudrioz
- Holiday (1938 film), an adaptation of Barry's play, starring Katharine Hepburn and Cary Grant
- Holiday (2001 film), a Russian film directed by Garik Sukachov
- Holiday (2006 film), a Bollywood film by Pooja Bhatt
- The Holiday, 2006, starring Cameron Diaz and Kate Winslet
- Holiday (2010 film), a French crime comedy directed by Guillaume Nicloux
- Holidays (2010 film), a Malayalam film directed by M M Ramachandran
- Holiday: A Soldier Is Never Off Duty, a 2014 Bollywood film by A. R. Murugadoss
- Holidays (2016 film), an American horror anthology film
- Holiday (2018 film), a Danish film directed by Isabella Eklöf
- Holiday (2019 film), a Russian film directed by Alexey Krasovsky
- Holiday (2023 film), an Italian film directed by Edoardo Gabbriellini
- Holy Days (film), a Canadian-New Zealand comedy directed by Nathalie Boltt

=== Literature ===
- Holiday, a 1923 novel by Waldo Frank
- Holiday (play), 1928, by Philip Barry
- Holiday (novel), 1974, by Stanley Middleton
- The Holiday, a 1928 novel by Carola Oman
- The Holiday, a 1933 novel by Richmal Crompton
- The Holiday (Italian: La vacanza), a 1963 novel by Dacia Maraini
- The Holiday, a 1996 novel by Guy Bellamy
- The Holiday, a 2000 novel by Erica James
- Holiday, a fictional character in the comics series Batman: The Long Halloween

=== Music ===
==== Albums ====
- Holiday (Alaska in Winter album), 2008
- Holiday (America album), 1974
- Holiday (Earth, Wind & Fire album), 2014
- Holiday (The Magnetic Fields album), 1994
- Holiday (Roberta Flack album), 2003
- Holiday (Russ Freeman album) or the title song, 1995
- The Holiday (album) or the title song, by Futures, 2010
- Holiday, by Jennifer Paige, 2012
- Holiday, by Sammi Cheng, 1991
- Holiday! A Collection of Christmas Classics, by Crystal Lewis, 2000

==== EPs ====
- Holiday EP, by Fiction Family, 2012
- The Holiday EP, by Brand New, 2003
- The Holidays (EP), by the Holidays, 2008
- Holiday, by Hrvy, or the title song, 2017

==== Songs ====
- "Holiday" (Bee Gees song), 1967
- "Holiday" (Dilana song), 2007
- "Holiday" (Dizzee Rascal song), 2009
- "Holiday" (Girls' Generation song), 2017
- "Holiday" (Green Day song), 2005
- "Holiday" (KSI song), 2021
- "Holiday" (Lil Nas X song), 2020
- "Holiday" (Little Mix song), 2020
- "Holiday" (Madonna song), 1983
- "Holiday" (Misia song), 2013
- "Holiday" (Naughty by Nature song), 1999
- "Holiday" (Nazareth song), 1980
- "Holiday" (Ocean Alley song), 2016
- "Holiday" (Vampire Weekend song), 2010
- "Holiday" (Vanessa Amorosi song), 2010
- "Holiday", by the Birthday Massacre from Violet, 2004
- "Holiday", by Boys Like Girls from Boys Like Girls, 2006
- "Holiday", by Britt Nicole from Say It, 2007
- "Holiday", by Calvin Harris from Funk Wav Bounces Vol. 1, 2017
- "Holiday", by Cameron Whitcomb from The Hard Way, 2025
- "Holiday", by Cascada from Perfect Day, 2007
- "Holiday", by Confidence Man from Tilt, 2022
- "Holiday", by DJ Antoine, 2015
- "Holiday", by Fireworks from All I Have to Offer Is My Own Confusion, 2009
- "Holiday", by the Get Up Kids from Something to Write Home About, 1999
- "Holiday", by Happy Mondays from Pills 'n' Thrills and Bellyaches, 1990
- "Holiday", by Hilary Duff from Best of Hilary Duff, 2008
- "Holiday", by Jet from Shine On, 2006
- "Holiday", by Jimmy Fallon and Jonas Brothers from Holiday Seasoning, 2024
- "Holiday", by the Kinks from Muswell Hillbillies, 1971
- "Holiday", by Lime Cordiale and Idris Elba from Cordi Elba, 2022
- "Holiday", by the Other Ones, 1987
- "Holiday", by Rema from Rave & Roses, 2022
- "Holiday", by Richard Wright from Wet Dream, 1978
- "Holiday", by the Rubens from 0202, 2021
- "Holiday", by Scorpions from Lovedrive, 1979
- "Holiday", by Stray Kids from Do It, 2025
- "Holiday", by Suzy from Faces of Love, 2018
- "Holiday", by T-ara from Day by Day, 2012
- "Holiday", by Turnstile from Glow On, 2021
- "Holiday", by Underground Lovers from Leaves Me Blind, 1992
- "Holiday", by Weezer from Weezer (Blue Album), 1994
- "Holidays" (Beach Boys song), 2011
- "Holidays" (Meghan Trainor song), 2020
- "Holidays", by Lydia from Devil, 2013
- "Holidays", by Miami Horror from Illumination, 2010
- "Holidays!", by Peppa Pig from My First Album, 2019
- "Holidays", by Remady & Manu-L, 2013

==== Other uses in music ====
- Holiday 100, Billboard music chart
- Holiday Records, an American record label
- Holiday Songs, Billboard music chart
- The Holidays, an Australian indie rock band
- Top Holiday Albums, Billboard music chart

=== Periodicals ===
- Holiday (magazine), a 1946–1977 American travel magazine
- Holiday (newspaper), a weekly newspaper in Bangladesh

=== Television ===
==== Episodes ====
- "Holiday" (Degrassi: The Next Generation)
- "Holiday" (Dilbert)
- "Holiday" (The Goodies)
- "Holiday" (Miranda)
- "Holiday" (Peep Show)
- "Holiday" (Stargate SG-1)
- "The Holiday" (Take a Letter, Mr. Jones)
- "Holidays" (Pocoyo)

==== Series ====
- Holiday (TV series), a 1969–2007 UK travel review show

== Other uses ==
- Holiday 20, an American sailboat design
- Holiday (horse) (foaled 1911), an American Thoroughbred racehorse
- Holiday Airlines, a defunct Turkish charter company
- Holiday Airlines (US airline), a defunct California intrastate airline
- Holiday Stationstores, a chain of convenience stores in the US
- MS Holiday, a cruise ship
- Holiday, a Pastafarian holiday
- Holiday, an appliance brand owned by Maytag

== See also ==
- Halliday
- Holliday (disambiguation)
- Public holiday
