= Thomas Halliday =

Thomas Halliday may refer to:

- Thomas Halliday (cricketer) (1904–1977), English cricketer
- Thomas Halliday (engraver) (c. 1780–c. 1854), English coin and medal engraver
- Thomas Halliday (trade unionist) (1835–1919), English trade unionist
- Thomas Halliday (writer), shortlisted for 2022 Wainwright Prize
- Thomas Symington Halliday (1902–1998), Scottish artist and teacher
- Tom Halliday (1909–1975), English footballer

== See also ==
- Tom Holliday (disambiguation)
