= Mëkanïk Dëstruktïẁ Kömmandöh =

Mekanïk Destruktïẁ Kommandöh

Studio album by Magma
- Released: 6 May 1973
- Recorded: April 1973
- Studio: The Manor Studio (London); Aquarium Studio (Paris)
- Genre: Zeuhl
- Length: 38:53
- Label: A&M (most of the world); Vertigo (original French release); Mercury (French reissues)
- Producer: Giorgio Gomelsky

Magma chronology
The Unnamables (1972)	Mekanïk Destruktïẁ Kommandöh (1973)	Ẁurdah Ïtah (1974)

Mekanïk Destruktïẁ Kommandöh, also abbreviated as MDK, is the third studio album by French band Magma, released on 6 May 1973. Mekanïk Destruktïẁ Kommandöh is a rock opera concept album telling the story of a doomed Earth caught in endless war, and a prophet's prediction that sparks a large demonstration march by Earthlings to kill him.

Mekanïk Destruktïẁ Kommandöh went through a long compositional process of around two years. It marked a large stylistic shift in the band away from jazz-rock and towards a more dark theatrical, Wagner-esque sound, leading to a huge personnel shuffle in the band. The original recording of the album was refused by A&M at the time, but was eventually released as Mekanïk Kommandöh in 1989.

MDK is the group's most famous and acclaimed record. The French edition of Rolling Stone magazine named the album the 33rd-greatest French rock album. In 2015, Rolling Stone ranked the album 24th on its list of the '50 Greatest Prog Rock Albums of All Time'.

== History ==
Mekanïk Destruktïẁ Kommandöh was conceptualized as the last movement of the trilogy Theusz Hamtaahk, which was written from 1970-1973. Although Mekanïk Destruktïẁ Kommandöh was the final movement to be started, written by Vander from 1971 to 1972, it was the first of them to be released. The first movement Theusz Hamtaahk, written in 1970 and finalised in 1973, has so far only been released on live recordings, first released on Retrospektïẁ in 1981, while the second movement Ẁurdah Ïtah, written in 1971, was released in 1974.

Mekanïk Destruktïẁ Kommandöh had gone through a longer, almost two-year, development phase before it was fully developed and first recorded in the studio. Originally known as Mekanïk Kommandöh, an extremely early version was recorded in the summer of 1971 and was released in 1972 as a 7" single, later re-released on the compilation Simples. This version starts with a jazzy bossa nova introduction, with lyrics that had not yet been finalised. Three months later, in November 1971, Mëkanïk Kömmandöh was performed for the first time in front of an audience at a concert at the Théâtre 140 in Brussels; this version was much more developed and featured many sections from the middle of the album, albeit still featuring the bossa nova intro. This performance was released in 1996 on the album Concert 1971, Bruxelles: Théâtre 140. The piece underwent a rapid transformation from 15 December 1971, with the piece's composition and structure becoming finalised on 25 February 1972.

In late 1972, most members who had performed on previous albums The Unnamables had moved on. Vander would recruit lighting technician Stella Zelcer for vocal and choral duties. She would become a consistent member of the band to present-day, and she and Vander would marry for around 10 years before amicably separating. Vander would also recruit bassist Jannick Top who would add a more apocalyptic sound to the album with his dark bass tone. He would collaborate with Vander on-and-off until late 1976.

The originally intended version for the release was recorded in January of 1973, and featured percussion, organ, bass, piano and a mixed choir. Its focus was on the choir vocals and a more "acoustic" musical accompaniment, with longer piano passages. This version was rejected by Magma's record label A&M Records, as it did not meet their standards for rock music. This version was eventually released in 1989 on the CD Mekanïk Kommandöh.

For the final album, electric guitar, brass, flute, bass clarinet, vibraphone, xylophone and additional vocalists were added to the line-up, and electrically amplified instruments and horns were used to achieve a "rockier" sound for the album, reflected in the addition of "Destruktïẁ" to the piece's name. It was recorded in April 1973 at the Oxford Manor Studios and the Aquarium Studio in Paris and released on 6 May 1973.

== Plot ==
After the expedition to Kobaïa, and the Kobaïan people's subsequent rejection of Earth after their envoys are imprisoned after rescuing an Earthling spacecraft, (Note: As depicted in Kobaïa (1970).) the Earth has become a dangerous place, caught in multiple cyclic disasters and endless fascist wars with no progress or harmony achieved since the Kobaïans left. (Note: As depicted in Theusz Hamtaahk (studio unreleased, recorded live in 1981 and 2000) and Ẁurdah Ïtah (1974))

The prophet Nëbëhr Ğudahtt berates the people of Earth and tells them that the only way to escape their endless conflict is to accept one another and purify themselves, so they can achieve a higher plane of existence. Ğudahtt is immediately denounced by the Earth Authorities, and a large horde of people stage a giant demonstration march to track Ğudahtt down and kill him. They slowly become lost in their own minds, and the march turns into an awakening of their own consciousness ("Hortz Fur Dëhn Štekëhn Ẁešt").

A lone voice representing the voice of the crowd's conscience tells them Ğudahtt is not a tyrant, he is a guide, but is ignored, until one man cries out that he has seen the Angel of Light smiling at him. More and more people report seeing the angel trying to guide the crowd and praying for their souls to be kept safe ("Ïmah Sürï Dondaï"). As the crowd starts to realise Ğudahtt's prophecy is true, the march turns into a "march for the universe", and the crowd ascends into immaterial beings, reciting Kobaïa's commandments ("Kobaïa Iss Deh Hündïn")

The crowd continues their march, chanting hymns that ascend them to the State of Grace ("Da Zeuhl Ẁortz Mëkanïk"). Ğudahtt appears to the crowd, showing he had been there all along, and proclaims that everyone will now ascend into infinity before disappearing ("Nëbëhr Ğudahtt"). The march becomes a mass exorcism that purifies Earth's inhabitants. Angels and seraphims bow to them in reverence which cause the crowd to evaporate one by one ("Mëkanïk Kömmandöh") until everyone on Earth has ascended to a new plane of being. ("Kreühn Köhrmahn Iss De Hündïn").

== Musical style ==
Magma's two previous albums, Magma (1970) and 1001° Centigrades (1971), were even more jazz-oriented and their compositions contributed by various band members. With Mëkanïk Dëstruktïẁ Kömmandöh, Vander and Magma created their typical Zeuhl style, which has been preserved until today through changing Magma line-ups and became the starting point of the Zeuhl genre ("Zeuhl Ẁortz" in Kobaïan means something like "music of all-embracing power" or "heavenly music").

Mëkanïk Dëstruktïẁ Kömmandöh is introduced by a monotonous beat with a repetitive piano motif with varied guitar ornamentation that is distantly reminiscent of psychedelic rock. After about two minutes, the horn section, as well as an evocative choir, enters and the piece increasingly picks up speed and dynamics. Dynamic changes between instrumental and vocal passages follow, which vary in tempo, rhythm and intensity in the course of the piece, with complex time signatures and contrapuntal motifs provide variety. At times, the melodies run against the lead vocals, and later in the piece, more vocal lines blend in smoothly.

== Legacy ==
Professional ratings
Review scores
Source	Rating
AllMusic	4.5/5 stars

Over the following years, Mëkanïk Dëstruktïẁ Kömmandöh was recorded in many different variations and instrumentations, the versions released on record alone ranging from 19:44 minutes on Live in Tokyo to 48:45 minutes on Theusz Hamtaahk.

In the 1990s, Vander rearranged Mëkanïk Dëstruktïẁ Kömmandöh into Baba Yaga La Sorcière for performance by children's choirs. This is a shortened version of the piece, whose Kobaian lyrics have been rewritten by Gaston Tavel so that they can easily be interpreted by a children's choirs. The recording of a concert on 15 October 1995 was released on CD in 1996.

Marking the 50th anniversary of Mëkanïk Dëstruktïẁ Kömmandöh, Magma released the LP box set Magma une histoire de Mekanik Coffret 50 ans Mëkanïk Dëstruktïw Kömmandöh in September 2023, limited to 2000 copies and containing different versions of the title from 1972 to 2021 on seven long-playing records.

== Track listing ==
All tracks are written by Christian Vander.

Side one
No.	Title	Length
1.	"Hortz Fur Dëhn Štekëhn Ẁešt"	9:36
2.	"Ïma Sürï Dondaï"	4:30
3.	"Kobaïa Iss Dëh Hündïn"	3:34
Total length:		17:40

Side two
No.	Title	Length
1.	"Da Zeuhl Ẁortz Mëkanïk"	7:48
2.	"Nëbëhr Gudahtt"	6:02
3.	"Mëkanïk Kömmandöh"	4:10
4.	"Kreühn Köhrmahn Ïss Dëh Hündin"	3:13
Total length:		21:13 (38:53)

Bonus track on some CD reissues
No.	Title	Length
8.	""M.D.K." (alternate version)"	34:35

Track 8 is a (mostly) instrumental demo of the piece that also appears on the double-CD rarities compilation Archiẁ I & II, available only on the 12 disc box set Studio Zünd: 40 Ans d'Evolution.

== Personnel ==
- Klaus Blasquiz – vocals, percussion
- Stella Vander – vocals
- Muriel Streisfield – vocals
- Evelyne Razymovski – vocals
- Michele Saulnier – vocals
- Doris Reinhardt – vocals
- René Garber – bass clarinet, vocals
- Teddy Lasry – brass, flute
- Jean-Luc Manderlier – piano, organ
- Claude Olmos – guitar
- Jannick Top – bass
- Christian Vander – drums, vocals, organ, percussion

with

- Giorgio Gomelsky – producer
- Eddie Sprigg – engineer
- Gilbert – engineer
- Gilles Sallé – engineer
- Simon Heyworth – engineer
- Steve Michell – engineer
- Tom Rabstener – engineer
- Loulou Sarkissian – stage manager

== Literature ==
- Gonin, Philippe (2010), "Mekanïk Destruktïw Kommandöh naissanced'une épopée", Magma - Décryptage d'un mythe et d'une musique (in French), Marseille: Le Mot et le Reste, pp. 147–159, ISBN 978-2-36054-000-6
