= Carroll Coates =

British-American songwriter (1929–2023)

Carroll Coates (23 September 1929 – 21 October 2023) was a British-American songwriter, composer and lyricist whose works were produced commercially from the 1950s to the 1990s. His songs have been recorded by Frank Sinatra, Carmen McRae, Tony Bennett, Shirley Horn, Mel Tormé, Nancy Wilson and others. His jazz ballad "You'll See" has been recorded by more than a dozen artists. Coates wrote at least nine songs for film, including Sunday in New York.

== Biography ==
Carroll Coates was born in Uxbridge, England on 23 September 1929. In 1996, he reportedly lived in the San Francisco Bay Area.

Following Sarah Vaughan's death in April 1990, Coates composed a song in tribute to her, called "Sarah". In a tribute concert for Sarah Vaughan on 25 June 1991, the Shirley Horn Trio performed "Sarah". Reviewing the concert, The New York Times reported:

Carroll Coates's affectionate tribute...praises Vaughan as one who "could do more with a melody than a hip whippoorwill." The final verse imagines Vaughan in heaven, in a quartet with Billie Holiday, Dinah Washington and Bessie Smith, where instead of squabbling over roles she says to Smith, "I'm new here, you lead."

On 28 April 1996, Coates was honoured in a concert called "Songfest: A Songwriters Celebration", held in Larkspur, California. Before the event, the San Francisco Chronicle reported that "Coates will introduce the vocalists who will sing his songs, among them Rebecca Parris, Faith Winthrop, Shanna Carlson, Buddy Conner and Amy Dondy."

Coates died at his home in Carmel, California, on 21 October 2023, at the age of 94.

== Works ==
=== Work for film ===
| Year | Film | Song | Notes |
|---|---|---|---|
| 1956 | Teenage Rebel | "Cool It, Baby" | Sung on soundtrack by Dick Lory, (Dick Glasser) |
| A Kiss Before Dying | "A Kiss Before Dying" | Lyricist | |
| | The Last Wagon | "Theme From The Last Wagon" | Lyricist |
| The Girl Can't Help It | "Cool It, Baby" | Lyricist | Performed by Eddie Fontaine |
| 1957 | The Way to the Gold | "The Drive-In Rock" | Lyricist |
| | | "Strange Weather" | Lyricist |
| | No Down Payment | "The Drive-In Rock" | Lyricist |
| | Kiss Them for Me | "Kiss Them For Me" | Lyricist |
| 1959 | Blue Denim | "The Drive-In Rock" | Lyricist |
| 1960 | Let's Make Love | "Cool It, Baby" | Lyricist |
| 1963 | Sunday in New York | "Sunday in New York" | Lyricist |
| 1965 | The Cavern | "The Cavern" | Composer/Lyricist |
| 1990 | Havana | "London By Night" | Composer/Lyricist |

=== Audio recordings ===
| Song | Recording Artist | Album |
|---|---|---|
| Afterglow | Chanticleer | Lost in the Stars |
| | Cleo Laine | Blue & Sentimental |
| | Kendra Shank | Afterglow |
| "Better To Have Loved" | Ida Zecco | Better To Have Loved |
| "Between An Old Love and a New Love" (Lyrics; Music by Hub Atwood) | Johnny Holiday | Holiday For Lovers |
| "City Lights" | Contemporary Jazz Orchestra | Trench Heroes |
| "Cool It, Baby" (Lyrics; Music by Lionel Newman)< | The Treniers | Cool It, Baby |
| "Daughter, Dear!" | Jim Porcella | Life Is So Pecualiar |
| "The Holiday Song" | Ida Zecco | A Song for Christmas |
| "I Am A Man (He Is A Man)" (Lyrics; Music by Ronnie Selbey) | Lizabeth Scott With Henri René And His Orchestra | Lizabeth |
| "I Have A Feeling" | Lynda Jamison | You and the Night and the Music |
| | Ida Zecco | Better To Have Loved |
| "I Still Believe in You" | Sarah Vaughan | The Divine Sarah Vaughan |
| "Kiss Them For Me" (Lyrics; Music by Lionel Newman) | Joan Crawford | The Best of Everything |
| | Lionel Newman and His Orchestra | Kiss Them For Me (Soundtrack) |
| "Later for Love" | Rebecca Parris & The Kenny Hadley Big Band | A Beautiful Friendship |
| "London By Night" | Singer Pur | Herztöne – Lovesongs |
| | Charly Antolini | Right On |
| | Tony Bennett | The Good Things in Life |
| | Rebecca Parris | Love Comes and Goes |
| | Ronnie Ross | It's a Wonderful World |
| | Frank Sinatra | Come Fly With Me |
| | Various Artists | The Golden Age of Light Music: Going Places |
| | John Williams | Echoes of London |
| Cleo Laine | Blue & Sentimental | |
| "Love Comes and Goes" Raquel Bitton I wish you love Album, 1996 | Cleo Laine | Blue & Sentimental |
| | Rebecca Parris | Love Comes and Goes |
| "Love Is Letting Go" | Jim Porcella | Life Is So Peculiar |
| "A Miracle" | Frank Mantooth Jazz Orchestra | A Miracle |
| "More in Love" (Lyrics; Music by Peter Nero) | Rosie Carlino | What Matters Most |
| "Music Is My Life" | Jim Porcella | Life Is So Peculiar |
| | Diane Schuur | Music Is My Life |
| "No One Ever Tells You" (with Hub Atwood) | Shirley Bassey | The Fabulous Shirley Bassey |
| | John "Buddy" Conner | Can't Hide Love! |
| | Rebecca Parris | Love Comes and Goes |
| | Jim Porcella | Life Is So Peculiar |
| | Ian Shaw and Cedar Walton | In a New York Minute |
| | Frank Sinatra | A Swingin' Affair! The Nearness of You |
| "Now I Live With You" | Jim Porcella | Life Is So Peculiar |
| "One for Monterey" | Black Market Jazz Orchestra | Art Attack |
| | Richie Cole | Profile |
| | Dave Costa | Impassioned |
| | De Paul University Jazz Ensemble | Shade Street |
| | Rebecca Parris | Love Comes and Goes |
| | Frank Mantooth Jazz Orchestra | A Miracle |
| "Park & Ride" | Richie Cole | Profile |
| "Sarah" | Richie Cole | Profile |
| | Carmen McRae | Sarah—Dedicated To You |
| "So I Love You" | Shirley Horn | Close Enough For Love |
| | Rebecca Parris | Love Comes and Goes |
| "Soft Sands" (Lyrics; Music by Lou Stein) | The Chordettes | The Best of the Chordettes |
| | Oscar Peterson | Soft Sands |
| "A Song For Christmas" | Charles Brown | Charles Brown's Cool Christmas Blues |
| | Laura Fygi | The Very Best Time of Year |
| | Nancy LaMott | Just in Time For Christmas |
| | Ida Zecco | A Song For Christmas |
| | Cantabile – The London Quartet | A Song For Christmas |
| "Sunday in New York" (Lyrics; Music by Peter Nero) | Doc Anello | Doin' It Our Way |
| | Ernestine Anderson | Be Mine Tonight |
| | Bobby Darrin | Ultra Lounge: Wild, Cool & Swingin' |
| | Keely Smith | I'm in Love Again |
| | Mel Tormé | Mel Tormé Sings Sunday in New York & Other Songs About New York |
| | Stanley Turrentine | In Memory Of |
| | Libby York | Sunday in New York |
| "The Swing Song" | Shanna Carlson | Swing High, Swing Low |
| | Lucy Reed | Basic Reeding |
| "Too Much in Love To Care" (Lyrics; Music by James J. Kriegsmann) | Carmen McRae | The First of Carmen McRae – The Bethlehem Years |
| "We Can Only Try" (Lyrics; Music by Peter Daniels) | Lainie Kazan | Body & Soul |
| | Diane Schuur | Pure Schuur |
| "Where Did the Summer Go?" | Rebecca Parris | Love Comes and Goes |
| "You'll See" | Misty Bade | Touching You Touching Me |
| | Rosie Carlino | What Matters Most |
| | Kelly Houston | "Songs of Love" |
| | Beth Logan | Time After Time |
| | Greta Matassa | I Wanna Be Loved |
| | Rebecca Parris | Love Comes and Goes |
| | Jackie Ryan | Doozy |
| | Diane Schuur | Love Songs |
| | Carol Sloane | Heart's Desire |
| | Paula West | Temptation |
| | Weslia Whitfield | Beautiful Love |
| | John B. Williams | Gratitude |
| | Nancy Wilson | R.S.V.P. |
| | Susan Winter | Love Rolls On |
| "You're So Far Above Me" | The Four Freshmen | The Complete Capitol Four Freshmen Fifties Sessions |

== Awards ==
Along with co-writers Peter Nero and Roland Everett, Coates was nominated for a Golden Globe Award in 1964 for composing the song "Sunday in New York" for the film of the same name.
