= John Holliday =

John Holliday may refer to:

- Doc Holliday (1851–1887), American dentist, gambler, and gunfighter, famed for the Gunfight at the O.K. Corral
- Doc Holliday (American football), American football coach
- John Holliday (barrister)
- John Holliday (judoka) (born 1960), British Olympic judoka
- John Holliday (pioneer), early American pioneer of Western Virginia
- John Holliday, guitarist of the British pop rock band The Escape Club
- John Holliday, a Texas freebooter who gave his name to Holliday, Texas
- Johnny Holliday, American radio sportscaster

== See also ==
- John Holiday, an American operatic countertenor
- John Holladay, founder of Holladay, Utah
- John Halliday (disambiguation), several people
- Johnny Holiday
