= Frank Edwards (cricketer) =

English cricketer (1885–1970)

Personal information
- Born: 23 May 1888; Merstham, Surrey, England
- Died: 10 July 1970 (aged 82); Winscombe, Somerset, England
- Batting: Left-handed
- Bowling: Left-arm medium Slow left-arm orthodox

Domestic team information
- Years: Team
- 1924–1933: Minor Counties
- 1914–1946: Buckinghamshire
- 1909: Surrey

Career statistics
Competition	First-class
Matches	6
Runs scored	31
Batting average	3.87
100s/50s	–/–
Top score	10
Balls bowled	874
Wickets	19
Bowling average	21.00
5 wickets in innings	1
10 wickets in match	1
Best bowling	8/98
Catches/stumpings	1/–
- Source: Cricinfo, 5 June 2011

Frank Edwards (23 May 1885 – 10 July 1970) was an English cricketer. Edwards was a left-handed batsman who initially bowled left-arm medium pace before turning to slow left-arm orthodox. He was born in Merstham, Surrey.

Having played for the Surrey Second XI in the Minor Counties Championship since 1907, although infrequently so, Edwards made his only first-class appearance for Surrey against Oxford University in 1909, taking 3 wickets in the match. He continued to play Minor Counties Championship matches for Second XI until 1911, after which he was released along with several other players and staff, after Surrey encountered financial difficulty.

He joined Buckinghamshire for the 1914 Minor Counties Championship, making his debut against Wiltshire. This was to be the start of a prolific career for Buckinghamshire in Minor counties cricket, one in which he represented the county until 1946, with only World War I and World War II truncating his playing career. Edwards made 165 appearances for Buckinghamshire in the Minor Counties Championship. He finished his career with the county having taken 1,082 wickets at an impressive average of 10.91 runs. His most prolific season was in 1923, when in 10 matches he took 104 wickets at an average of 9.99. He was regarded by Sir Pelham Warner as one of the best slow-left arm bowlers in the country.

His move down to Minor Counties cricket did not put an end to this first-class playing days. Edwards' next appearance in first-class cricket came for the Minor Counties cricket team against HDG Leveson-Gower's XI. He went wicket-less in the XI's first-innings, before taking 4 wickets in their second. He was selected to represent the Players in the annual Gentlemen v Players fixture in 1925. His next appearance came for the Minor Counties against the touring South Africans in 1929, bowling only 6 overs in the match without taking a wicket. That same season he appeared for the Minor Counties against Lancashire at Old Trafford, where he took the wicket of Thomas Halliday for the cost of 59 runs from 18 overs. His final first-class match turned out to be his most successful, which came against the West Indians in 1933. He took 8 wickets in the West Indians first-innings, for the cost of 98 runs. He followed this up by taking a further 2 in their second-innings, giving him a 10 wicket haul in the match.

Edwards also played non-county cricket, appearing as Haslingden Cricket Club's professional from 1925 to 1929. He also played for Slough Cricket Club, taking all 10 wickets in a match on three occurrences for the club. Following his retirement, he coached cricket at Eton, Uppingham and for 16 years at Millfield. He died in Winscombe, Somerset on 10 July 1970.
