= Retrospektïẁ =

- Cover of the 2017 release

Live album by Magma
- Released: 1981
- Recorded: 9–11 June 1980
- Venue: Olympia Hall
- Genre: Zeuhl
- Length: 127:18 (CD); 111:55 (LP & digital); 76:09 (Retrospektïẁ 1&2); 35:46 (Retrospektïẁ 3)
- Label: RCA Records, Seventh Records

Magma chronology
Attahk (1978)	Retrospektïẁ (1981)	Merci (1984)

Alternative cover
- Retrospektiw I + II RCA cover

Alternative cover
- Retrospektiw III RCA cover

Singles from Retrospektïẁ
- 1. "Retrovision" / "La Dawotsin" Released: 1981

Retrospektïẁ is a two-part live triple album by French rock band Magma, with both parts released in 1981. It documents live recordings from a series of 10th anniversary Magma shows in Paris on 9, 10 and 11 June 1980. It was originally released on RCA, and has been re-released on Seventh Records.

== Background ==
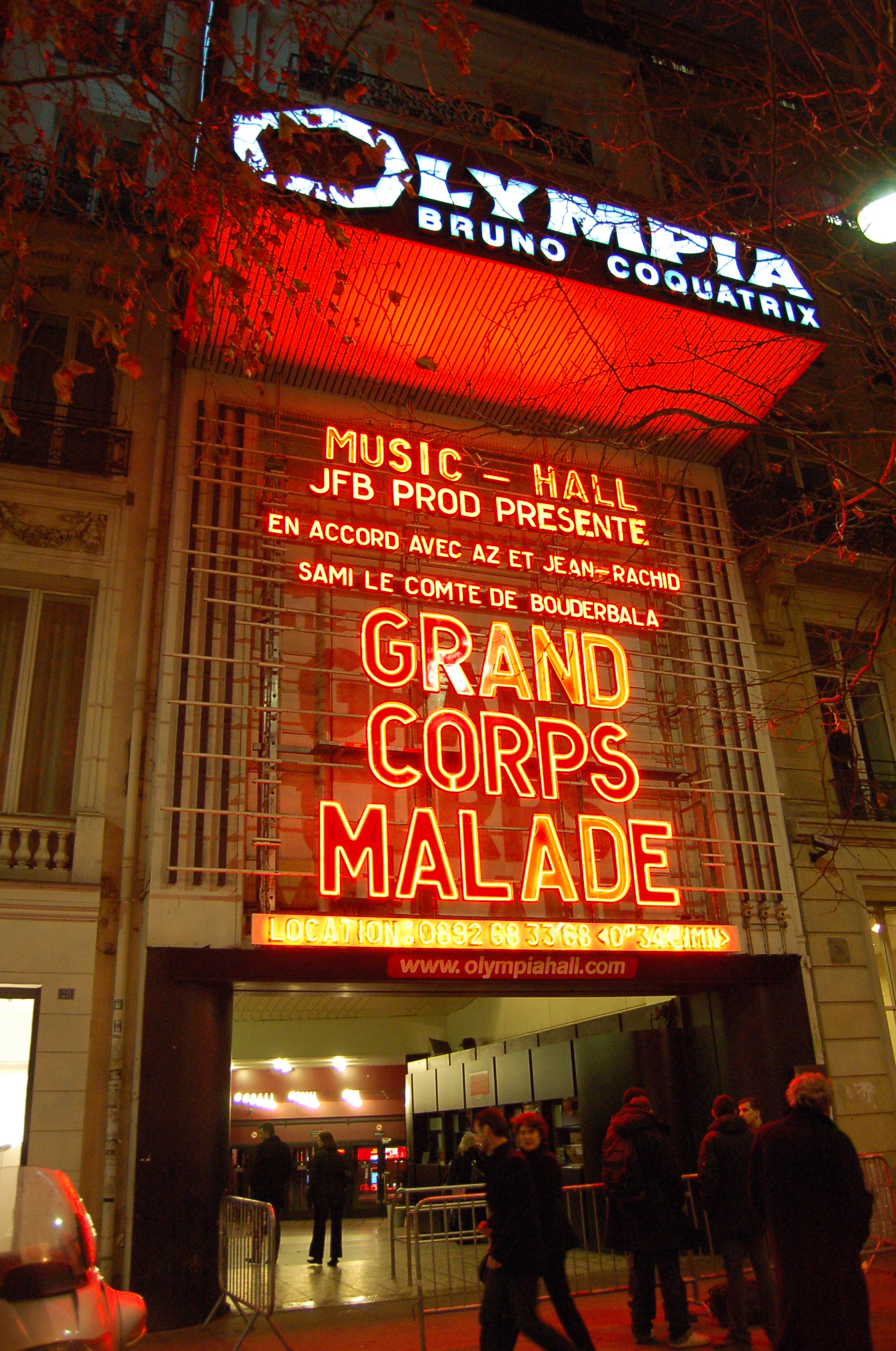
Location of the concert Olympia music hall Paris (Photo 2009)

For Magma's tenth anniversary, a set of three concerts on June 9-11, 1980 at the Olympia Hall were organised. Almost every single musician who had performed with Magma over their history would play a role in these concerts, with the notable exception of Jannick Top. This live material would be released as two albums; Retrospektïẁ 3, a single album, would be released first, shortly followed by Retrospektïẁ 1&2, a double album. The whole set would be re-released years later as a single-set triple album.

Retrospektïẁ features the first version of Theusz Hamtaahk on an official Magma release. Theusz Hamtaahk is the first part of the trilogy of the same name also comprising Ẁurdah Ïtah and Mëkanïk Dëstruktïẁ Kömmandöh. Vander started composition on Theusz Hamtaahk in 1970; it has been performed since the early 1970s, and has not received a standard studio release, although the live album Theusz Hamtaahk Trilogy in 2001 would feature an updated live version of all three parts.

In a similar vein, a failed studio recording of "Retrovision" had been previously attempted for Attahk and played live since 1979; a second attempt was made on January 23, 1980 for an album that never materialised. In contrast to Theusz Hamtaahk, Vander has gone at length to say that another studio recording of the track will never be attempted. The January 1980 demo was released as a bonus track for the single-set triple album release, specifically on CD.

The finished releases of Retrospektïẁ would be extensively overdubbed with new instrumental material. Klaus Blasquiz, who had been Magma's main vocalist since recording sessions of their first album, Kobaïa, would depart soon after these concerts. On Retrospektïẁ 3, he would go uncredited, despite performing for all three concerts, as many of his vocalisations were overdubbed by Guy Khalifa on the finished album.

== Track listing ==
All tracks are written by Christian Vander.

Retrospektïẁ 1&2
No.	Title	Length
1.	"Theusz Hamtaahk (Note: On the original release, the track listing for Retrospektïẁ 1&2 were swapped, and each track took up 2 sides of vinyl.)"	36:05
2.	"Mëkanïk Dëstruktïẁ Kömmandöh"	40:06

Retrospektïẁ 3
No.	Title	Length
1.	"Retrovision (Je suis revenu de l'univers)"	18:13
2.	"Hhaï"	13:25
3.	"La dawotsin"	4:12

Bonus track (CD only)
No.	Title	Length
1.	"Retrovision -Prima Materia-"	15:23

== Personnel ==
- Christian Vander – drums, composition, vocals, piano (5), soloist chant (4–5)
- Stella Vander – vocals
- Liza Deluxe – vocals
- Bernard Paganotti – bass (1–2, 4–5), vocals (1–2)
- Dominique Bertram – bass (3, 6)
- Jean-Luc Chevalier – bass (3, 6), guitar (2–4, 6)
- Jean-Pierre Fouquey – electric piano (3–4)
- Benoît Widemann – electric piano & keyboards (1–4, 6), mixing (1–5)
- Patrick Gauthier – electric piano & keyboards (1–2)
- Gabriel Federow – guitar (1–2)
- François Laizeau – percussion (3–4)
- René Garber – performer (3–6)
- Didier Lockwood – violin (1–2, 4)
- Klaus Blasquiz – vocals (1–2, 6)
- Claire Laborde – vocals (2)
- Maria Popkiewicz – vocals (2–5)
- Guy Khalifa – vocals (3, 5)
- Carol Rowley – vocals (6)
- Marcus Linon – mastering
- Alaian Cluzeau – mixing (1–5)
- Bruno Menny – mixing (1–5)
- Jean-Bernard Plé – mixing (1–5)
- Alain Français – recording (1–5)
- Jean-Louis Rizet – recording (6)
- Laurent Peyron – recording (6)
- Francis Linon – live technician (1–5)

== Literature ==
- Gonin, Philippe (2010), "Retrospektïw", Magma - Décryptage d'un mythe et d'une musique (in French), Marseille: Le Mot et le Reste, pp. 211–226, ISBN 978-2-36054-000-6
