= William Halliday =

William Halliday may refer to:

- William Halliday (politician) (1828–1892), Australian politician
- William Reginald Halliday (1886–1966), English historian
- William P. Halliday (1827–1899), American steamboat captain, banker and businessman

== See also ==
- William Haliday (1788–1812), Irish language scholar
- William Holliday (disambiguation)
