= Hallyday =

Hallyday is a surname. Notable people with the surname include:

- David Hallyday (born 1966), French singer-songwriter and racing driver
- Estelle Hallyday (born 1966), French actress and model
- Johnny Hallyday (1943–2017), French singer and actor

== See also ==
- Halladay
- Halliday
