= Johnny Holiday =

John Holiday or Johnny Holiday may refer to:

- John Holiday (born 1985) - an American operatic countertenor
- Johnny Holiday (actor) (1912–2009) - an American actor
- Johnny Holiday (film) - a 1949 American crime film
- John Holiday, known as Kid Memphis - an American musician, writer, and actor
- John Holiday - a member of the Protestant martyrs who were burnt on 27 June 1558 in Smithfield, London

== See also ==
- John Holliday
- John Halliday
- Johnny Holliday
- Johnny Hallyday
- Jon Halliday
