= Kobaïa =

Kobaïa [Magma]

Studio album by Magma
- Released: October 1970
- Recorded: Late April - May 6, 1970
- Genre: Zeuhl; jazz-rock; rock opera
- Length: 81:45
- Language: Kobaïan, English
- Label: Philips
- Producer: Laurent Thibault

Magma chronology
Kobaïa [Magma] (1970)	1001° Centigrades (1971)

Singles from Magma
- 1. "Kobaïa" / "Mûh" Released: 1970

Kobaïa (initially released as Magma) is the debut album by French rock band Magma. Released as a double-LP in 1970, it is a rock opera concept album which tells the story of a group of people fleeing a doomed Earth to settle on the fictional planet Kobaïa. Except for the first song, which is sung mostly in English, all lyrics are sung in the Kobaïan language invented by the band.

== Background ==
As a child, Christian Vander lived in squalor with his teenage mother. Musicians such as Bobby Jaspar, Elvin Jones, and Chet Baker occasionally visited their home. In 1960, Baker gave Vander his first drum set, which bailiffs later informed him was stolen. Jones joined John Coltrane's quartet in 1960, and Coltrane subsequently became Vander's personal idol and greatest inspiration. Vander's neighbors would play Coltrane's records through their window, as Vander was too poor to afford food, regularly stealing from nearby grocers. Shortly after, Vander's mother was arrested on drug-related charges, and Vander was left alone to fend for himself, developing an obsessive dependence on Coltrane's music. In 1965, Vander established a few short-lived bands, such as Cruciferius Lobonz, which he founded with future Magma member Bernard Paganotti. A piece of Vander's they would perform that was heavily inspired by Coltrane's work, entitled "Nogma", featured Vander singing in an unstructured foreign language; the concept would eventually evolve into the Kobaïan language.

In July 1967, John Coltrane died, which devastated Vander to the point where he entered depression and regularly thought about suicide. An occasion where Vander played drums in a local club on a whim caused him to be recruited by a band to tour in Italy for two months. Vander would then aimlessly soul-search and binge with the intention to die until the spring of 1969, where a experience watching the sunrise in Turin caused him to snap out of his senses and return to Paris. He would live with his mother on a diet of exclusively lemonade and rice pudding for six months, and compose "Malaria" during this time.

== Composition and recording ==
Upon returning, Vander met saxophonist René Garber and then bandleader Laurent Thibault, forming Magma to fill the void left by the death of Coltrane. They would tour in casinos on the Côte d'Opale alongside singer Zabu and organist Francis Moze, initially playing R&B and spiritual jazz including many of Coltrane's work. Magma would then recruit pianist Eddie Rabin, bassist Jacky Vidal, singer Klaus Blasquiz, and guitarist Claude Engel. The group would slowly sneak in original material focusing on extensive musical improvisations throughout their shows, turning their vocal experimentation into the Kobaïan language, as to Vander, French "just wasn't expressive enough, either for the story or for the sound of the music". Blasquiz has described Kobaïan as "a language of the heart" whose words are "inseparable from the music". Classical pianist Karl Knutt agreed to finance the band $10,000 on the spot after hearing the band perform their original material.

To compose the material for Kobaïa, their first album, the group secluded themselves for three months in a house in the Vallée de Chevreuse where they would rehearse all day, with individual practice in the morning and group work in the afternoon; at the conclusions of the rehearsal both Moze and second bassist Jacky Vidal would wreck and destroy everything inside. After a local bidding war, Lee Halliday would sign them a contract with Philips on April 1, 1970, and there was another personnel shuffle - Eddie Rabin was replaced by François Cahen on piano, Laurent Thibault gave up the bass and focused on production, and Francis Moze then replaced him on bass. Teddy Lasry, Richard Raux, and Alain Charlery completed the lineup on horns. The album was then recorded late that same month at the Europa Sonor studio in Paris, concluding on May 6, 1970.

== Plot ==
=== The Voyage ===
Tired of endless conflict and suffering on Earth, followers of the Kobaïan faith decide to leave the planet. Believing of a distant planet named Kobaïa that will grant them eternal peace and prosperity, they build a rocket ship to carry them there. Before departuring, the Kobaïans sing one final message to Earth in English, hoping that those weary of the planet's state will be convinced to join them. They then recite their holy commandments and enter the ship ("Kobaïa").

The ship launches to the joy of its passengers ("Aïna"), and continues until a required stop on the planet Malaria, where the Kobaïans reflect on their spite for the planet ("Malaria"). After a full day's rest on the planet ("Sohïa"), the ship departs only to encounter a meteor shower which it narrowly escapes ("Sckxyss"). Following a long voyage, the ship finally turns in orbit around Kobaïa to the amazement of the passengers, successfully landing ("Auraë").

=== The Discovery of Kobaïa ===
The section opens with a 'love song' to an unknown recipient, possibly the Kobaïan planet ("Thaud Zaïa"). The Kobaïans gradually adapt to their new environment; although nature initially considers them intruders, they soothe the land (or its residents) with their songs, eventually participating with others in 'a giant ballet of monsters' that celebrates their acceptance ("Naü Ektila").

Time passes. The fascist Earth Authorities learn of the thriving human civilisation that has formed on Kobaïa and, enraged by their success, launches a scouting party to Kobaïa, who the Kobaïans save from certain death after they get into orbital difficulties. They inform Kobaïa of multiple cyclic disasters that have occurred on Earth, and urge them to visit, to which the Kobaïans agree ("Stöah").

A squad of Kobaïan envoys return to Earth to a warm welcome, and are paraded with enthusiasm. After meeting with the Earth Authorities, they present their message of harmony and are met with guarded silence; the next day they are imprisoned, but a message is sent to Kobaïa of the incident. The Kobaïans realise that although they value peace and beauty, the only message the Earth will understand is that of deterrence, and create and reveal Stöah, a planet-destroying superweapon to rescue their people. The Earthlings beg for forgiveness and to be taken with them; their pleas are ignored, and the Kobaïans depart, leaving Earth behind forever as the crowd's cries die away (“Mûh”).

== Reception ==
Professional ratings
Review scores
Source	Rating
AllMusic	3.5/5 stars

The impact of Kobaïa's release was quite limited; it did not chart and was generally met with confusion. Reviewing for Rock & Folk in June 1970, Philippe Paringaux remarked that "Magma's music is quite uncomfortable, plunging you for nearly two hours into the unknown of a hallucinatory, haggard journey," but complimented its originality. Emmanuel Gray, reviewing for Jazz Hot, was far more positive, remarking that "the music is structured with the greatest care" and that the group was "very polished [...] with strong individual talents, playing a personal style of music".

A year later, Jean-Paul Commin of Best magazine awarded 1001° Centigrades the July 1971 album of the month award, remarking it was chosen partly to compensate for Kobaïa's lack of earlier recognition, and noted that listeners who enjoyed Centigrades would likely value Kobaïa just as highly.

The album is included in the book Philippe Manœuvre Presents: French Rock, from Johnny Hallyday to BB Brunes, 123 Essential Albums.

== Track listing ==
Side one
No.	Title	Writer(s)	Length
1.	"Kobaïa"	Christian Vander	10:15
2.	"Aïna"	Vander	6:15
3.	"Malaria"	Vander	4:20
Total length:			20:50

Side two
No.	Title	Writer(s)	Length
1.	"Sohïa"	Teddy Lasry	7:00
2.	"Sckxyss"	François Cahen	3:47
3.	"Auraë"	Vander	10:55
Total length:			21:42

Side three
No.	Title	Writer(s)	Length
1.	"Thaud Zaïa"	Claude Engel	7:00
2.	"Naü Ektila"	Laurent Thibault	12:55
Total length:			19:55

Side four
No.	Title	Writer(s)	Length
1.	"Stöah"	Vander	8:05
2.	"Mûh"	Vander	11:13
Total length:			19:18 (81:45)

== Personnel ==
=== Magma ===
- Christian Vander – drums, vocals
- Klaus Blasquiz – vocals
- François Cahen – piano
- Alain "Paco" Charlery – trumpet, percussion
- Claude Engel – guitars, flute, vocals
- Teddy Lasry – soprano sax, flute
- Francis Moze – electric bass, contrabass
- Richard Raux – alto and tenor sax, flute
- Laurent Thibault – production

=== Production ===
- Claude Martelot – engineer
- Lee Hallyday – production supervision
- Louis Haig Sarkissian – stage manager
- Marie-Josèphe Petit – cover artwork
- Marcel Engel – technical assistant
- Roger Roche – engineer

== Literature ==
- Gonin, Philippe (2010), "Kobaïa la naissance d'un mythe", Kobaïa la naissance d'un mythe (in French), Marseille: Le Mot et le Reste, pp. 119–134, ISBN 978-2-36054-000-6
