= The Unnamables =

Studio album by Univeria Zekt
- Released: January 1972
- Recorded: 23-29 August 1971
- Studio: Château d'Hérouville
- Genre: Jazz-rock; zeuhl
- Length: 33:47
- Label: Thélème
- Producer: Laurent Thibault

Magma chronology
1001° Centigrades (aka. 2) (1971)	The Unnamables (1972)	Mëkanïk Dëstruktïẁ Kömmandöh (1973)

The Unnamables is the only album recorded by Magma under the alias Univeria Zekt. Released in 1972, the album shows a more accessible jazz fusion sound, in an attempt by the band to experiment and reach a broader audience.

== Background and recording ==
From the 27th to 30th July 1970, Magma would record material at Europa Sonor for the never released film 24 Heures Seulement. This material would remain unreleased until it was later released as the Archiw 1 disc as part of the 2008 Studio Zünd boxset.

Shortly after the recording of 1001° Centigrades, Magma would record The Unnamables at the Château d'Hérouville, featuring almost the same line-up. The album was approached as a side-project and a vehicle for the band to explore new directions, to re-record material that was originally composed for 24 Heures Seulement, and as a gesture to original member Laurent Thibault to release on his record label Thélème.

== Reception and legacy ==
Due to a distribution issue, only 1500 copies were produced of the album. As such, the album was released to little-to-no fanfare, nevertheless, it sold out.

This incarnation of Magma would tour relentlessly throughout 1972, recording their last original song together in September 1972 for Jean Yanne's 1973 film Moi y'en a vouloir des sous, which remains unreleased. Shortly after, a major personnel shuffle in Magma occurred due to Vander's ever-growing control and disagreements on the band's sound. Excluding Vander, Lasry and Klaus Blasquiz, none of the personnel who performed on 1001° Centigrades or The Unnamables would feature on the band's next album, Mëkanïk Dëstruktïẁ Kömmandöh. Saxophonist Yochk'o Seffer and keyboardist François Cahen would leave to form Zao, a band following in the footsteps of Magma's first two releases.

== Track listing ==
Side one
No.	Title	Writer(s)	Length
1.	"You Speak and Speak and Colegram"	Teddy Lasry	2:10
2.	"Altcheringa"	François Cahen, Zabu	3:27
3.	"Clementine"	Lasry	3:00
4.	"Something's Cast a Spell"	Lasry, Lionel Ledissez	4:16
5.	"Ourania"	Christian Vander	4:23
Total length:			17:16

Side two
No.	Title	Writer(s)	Length
1.	"Africa Anteria"	Vander	11:30
2.	"Undia"	Vander	4:47
Total length:			16:17

== Personnel ==
- Christian Vander – drums, percussion, voice (6)
- Teddy Lasry – saxophones, flute, organ
- Jeff Seffer – saxophones
- Tito Puentes – trumpet
- Francois Cahen – pianos
- Claude Engel – electric and acoustic guitars
- Francis Moze – bass guitar, organ
- Klaus Blasquiz – percussion, vocals (4, 7)
- Lucien "Zabu" Zabuski – vocals (2)
- Lionel Ledissez – vocals (4)
