= Michael Halliday (disambiguation) =

Michael Halliday (1925–2018) was a British linguist.

Michael Halliday may also refer to:

- Michael Frederick Halliday (1822–1869), English amateur artist
- John Creasey (1908–1973), English crime and science fiction writer, who also used the pseudonym Michael Halliday
- Michael Halliday (cricketer) (born 1948), Irish cricketer
- Michael Halliday (footballer, born 1979) (born 1979), Northern Irish footballer
- Michael Halliday (soccer, born 2003) (born 2003), American soccer player
