= Ẁurdah Ïtah =

- Cover of the Magma release

Studio album by Magma
- Released: 15 June 1974
- Recorded: 4, 5, and 8 April 1974
- Studio: Studio Milan, Paris
- Genre: Zeuhl
- Length: 39:04
- Label: Barclay Records (1974) Egg Records (1978) Seventh Records
- Producer: Laurent Thibault

Magma chronology
| Mëkanïk Dëstruktïẁ Kömmandöh (1973) | Ẁurdah Ïtah (1974) | Köhntarkösz (1974) |

Alternative covers
- Cover of the 1974 Christian Vander release on Barclay Records

Alternative cover
- Cover of the 1978 LP release on Egg Records

Professional ratings
Review scores
| Source | Rating |
|---|---|
| Allmusic | 3/5 stars |

Ẁurdah Ïtah is the fourth studio album by French progressive rock band Magma, originally released on 15 June 1974 under the name Tristan et Iseult as a Christian Vander solo album.

The album was never planned to be released in its original title or under solely Vander, but an unauthorised demo of the piece was used for the soundtrack for Yvan Lagrange's 1972 avant-garde film Tristan et Iseult; through an agreed settlement it was released and financed directly by Lagrange on Barclay Records. The album has been released with its intended name and credit to Magma since 1989, when it was re-released on Vander's own Seventh Records.

== Background and recording ==
A very early version of Ẁurdah Ïtah, titled Theusz Hamtaahk, was first performed in the spring of 1971 at a one-off acoustic concert at the Gibus Club in Paris, around the recording of 1001° Centigrades. Yvan Lagrange was in attendance and asked for permission to use the pieces in a recording for his then in progress avant-garde film Tristan et Iseult (1972). The band declined his offer.

The piece was later revisited on January 3, 1972, where the lineup of Klaus Blasquiz (percussion/vocals), Jean-Pierre Lembert (electric bass), René Garber (vocals), and Christian Vander (piano/drums/vocals) would record a 25:53 demo version of the piece. Laurent Thibault, a friend and past producer for the band, would then hand this recording over to Yvan Lagrange as a gift; he would exploit Thibault by using it in Tristan et Iseult without the band's permission. This version was remastered in 2018 and is included as a bonus track on reissues as "Ẁurdah Ïtah (Prima Matéria)"

The band was ultimately less than enthusiastic about Lagrange's finished film, and even less so about the unauthorised use of the piece. Blasquiz was ashamed of his now association with the film, which he described as "a total fiasco with a never-ending lack of plot, making little, if any, sense". Vander approached Lagrange with an ultimatum - the band would either launch legal action or Lagrange would finance a full re-recording of the piece. Lagrange agreed to the latter, but admittedly did not have much in way of finance and so Ẁurdah Ïtah was begrudgingly re-recorded in three afternoons (the 4th, 5th and 8th of April 1974) at Jean-Pierre Bameull's Studio de Milan in Paris with a line-up reduced to only a quartet of musicians (consisting of drums, bass, piano, and vocals).

The album was released under its original name twice; in 1974 on Barclay Records and in 1978 on Egg Records. When Vander gained full control over his past catalogue in 1989, the album was re-released on Seventh Records retrospectively as Magma's fourth studio album, Ẁurdah Ïtah, and has been released with that name ever since. The new cover art is taken from a still from Lagrange's Tristan et Iseult film, which has since fallen into obscurity.

In future live performances, the piece was further expanded instrumentally with more elaborate vocal passages, boosting the piece to a runtime of around 50 minutes.

== Plot ==
Ẁurdah Ïtah (which translates from Kobaïan roughly as Dead Earth) is the second part of the Theusz Hamtaahk Trilogy. It is preceded by Theusz Hamtaahk (Time of Hatred), which is only available on live albums, including Retrospektïẁ (1981), and Trilogie Theusz Hamtaahk (Concert du Trianon) (2001), and succeeded by Mëkanïk Dëstruktïẁ Kömmandöh (1973).

== Track listing ==
All tracks are written by Christian Vander

Side one
| No. | Title | Length |
|---|---|---|
| 1. | "Malaẁëlëkaahm" | 3:37 |
| 2. | "Bradïa Da Zïmehn Iëgah" | 2:18 |
| 3. | "Manëh Fur Da Zëss" | 1:38 |
| 4. | "Fur Dï hël Kobaïa" | 4:55 |
| 5. | "Blüm Tendiwa" | 3:29 |
| 6. | "Ẁohldünt Mᴧëm Dëẁëlëss" | 3:29 |

Side two
| No. | Title | Length |
|---|---|---|
| 1. | "Ẁaïnsaht !!!" | 2:30 |
| 2. | "Ẁlasïk Steuhn Kobaïa" | 2:46 |
| 3. | "Sëhnntëht Dros Ẁurdah Süms" | 3:24 |
| 4. | "C'est la vie qui les a menés là !" | 4:58 |
| 5. | "Ëk Sün Da Zëss" | 2:16 |
| 6. | "De Zeuhl Ündazïr" | 3:40 |

Bonus track; original unauthorized soundtrack to Tristan et Iseult (1972)
| No. | Title | Length |
|---|---|---|
| 13. | "Ẁurdah Ïtah (Prima Matéria)" | 25:53 |

== Personnel ==
=== Magma ===
- Stella Vander – vocals
- Klaus Blasquiz – vocals, percussion
- Jannick Top – bass
- Christian Vander – drums, piano, Rhodes piano, percussion, vocals

=== Personnel ===
- Laurent Thibault - production

== Literature ==
- Gonin, Philippe (2010), "Ẁurdah Ïtah", Magma - Décryptage d'un mythe et d'une musique (in French), Marseille: Le Mot et le Reste, pp. 161–170, ISBN 978-2-36054-000-6
