= Halladay =

Halladay is an English and Scottish surname which may refer to:

- Daniel Halladay (1826–1916), American engineer, inventor and businessman
- Howard Hadden Halladay (1876–1952), Canadian politician
- Roy Halladay (1977–2017), American baseball player

== See also ==
- Halladay (automobile), a defunct American automobile manufacturing company founded in 1905
- Halladay Farmhouse, Duanesburg, New York, on the National Register of Historic Places
- Halliday, a list of people with the surname Halliday or Haliday
