= Holiday (surname) =

Holiday is a surname. Notable people with the surname include:

- Aaron Holiday (born 1996), American basketball player
- Billie Holiday (1915–1959), American singer
- Bob Holiday (1932–2017), played Superman in the 1966 Broadway musical
- Carlyle Holiday (born 1981), American football wide receiver
- Clarence Holiday (1898–1937), American musician and the probable father of singer, Billie Holiday
- Eugene Holiday (born 1962), first Governor of Sint Maarten
- Fredrick William Holiday (1920–1979), British journalist, angler, cryptozoologist, and wildlife specialist
- Harry Holiday (1924–1999), world record holder in the backstroke in the 1940s and a president of steelmaker American Rolling Mill Co. (Armco)
- Henry Holiday (1839–1927), English artist
- Hope Holiday (born 1938), born in New York, NY
- J. Holiday (born 1982), American R&B singer-songwriter
- Jimmy Holiday (1934–1987), American singer and songwriter
- Jimmy Holiday (American football) (born 2001), American football player
- Joe Holiday (1925–2016), American jazz saxophonist born in Sicily
- Johnny Holiday (actor) (1912–2009), American actor
- Jrue Holiday (born 1990), basketball player; husband of Lauren
- Justin Holiday (born 1989), basketball player
- Lauren Holiday (born 1987), soccer player
- Philip Holiday (born 1970), professional junior middleweight boxer
- Tasha Holiday, R&B singer who was signed to MCA Records in the 1990s
- Tony Holiday (1951–1990), German pop singer and songwriter

== Fictional characters ==
- The Holiday family, a family featured in the video game Deltarune
  - Carol Holiday, a character in the video game Deltarune
  - December "Dess" Holiday, an as-of-yet unseen character in the video game Deltarune
  - Noelle Holiday, a major character in the video game Deltarune
  - Rudolph "Rudy" Holiday, a character in the video game Deltarune

== See also ==
- Holliday (name)
