= 1001° Centigrades =

Studio album by Magma
- Released: 5 October 1971
- Recorded: 5 – 10 April 1971
- Studio: Château d'Hérouville
- Genre: Zeuhl; jazz-rock; rock opera
- Length: 41:54
- Label: Philips
- Producer: Roland Hilda

Magma chronology
| Kobaïa (1970) | 1001° Centigrades (1971) | The Unnamables (1972) |

Alternative cover
- Cover of the promo 1971 release and some future releases

Singles from 1001° Centigrades
- 1. "Hamtaak" / "Tendeï Kobah" Released: 19 May 1971; 2. "Mekanïk Kommando" / "Klaus Kömbälad" Released: January 1972

1001° Centigrades is the second album by French rock band Magma, released on 5 October 1971. It is a rock opera concept album telling the story of a failed expedition to the planet Kobaïa.

== Background and recording ==
For this album, Magma underwent many personnel changes, so much so that at one point the band announced their dissolution. At the end of 1970, after the release of Kobaïa, guitarist Claude Engel departed the band at a rehearsal at the behest of his wife; he was not replaced. Alain Charlery and Richard Raux subsequently departed and were replaced by Louis Toesca (trumpet) and Yochk'o Seffer (sax, bass clarinet). Laurent Thibault was no longer considered a core member and did not return to produce, but he would contribute production on The Unnamables (1972), Ẁurdah Ïtah (1974), and Attahk (1978).

During 1971, Magma were asked by Philips to condense some of their material into excerpts for promotion. This would result in two 7" singles, "Hamtaak / Tendeï Kobah" (1971) and "Mekanïk Kommando / Klaus Kömbälad" (1972). "Tendeï Kobah" and "Klaus Kömbälad" consist of expanded versions of the opening and closing sections of "Rïah Sahïltaahk" respectively. These singles would later be re-released on the compilation Simples.

Christian Vander was not satisfied with the final recording of "Rïah Sahïltaahk" present on the album but relented as other band members found it satisfactory. In 2014 a re-recording of the track was released as a stand-alone studio album, Rïah Sahïltaahk, which added new instrumental passages and replaced many of the brass arrangements with female choral vocals.

== Packaging ==
The cover art and name to 1001° Centigrades was reportedly producer Roland Hilda's only real contribution to the album. The album was intended to be released as 2 or Magma 2. Vander had also insisted on a simple gray cover with Magma's logo, with the plan to repeat the process for the four different classical elements. Both Philips and Hilda objected, who would instead with a literal sense of the band's name, suggest the name 1001° Centigrades and commissioned a piece featuring an erupting volcano for the cover art. Very early promo copies would retain the original design.

The backside of the original record sleeve contains Christian Vander’s poem ‘Ïtah’ as well as a French translation, making it one of two official Kobaïan-French translations by the band itself.

== Plot ==
The album's first track is a sidequel to Kobaia (1970).

=== Rïah Sahïltaahk ===
As the Kobaïans prepare to leave Earth and fail to convince its people to embark with them on their journey, Rïah Sahïltaahk, who thinks better of himself than anyone else, is sure he can convert them to the Kobaïan spirit and decides to stay on the planet to do so. He fails miserably and leaves alone for Kobaïa, long after everyone else. He retraces the Kobaïans' planned journey through space, landing on the stop-over planet Malaria, but his ship is battered by the 'raging elements' of the planet and he drowns to his death. The storm ceases immediately after, and the soft beams of the sun fall upon his final resting place.

== Critical reception and legacy ==
Professional ratings
Review scores
| Source | Rating |
|---|---|
| AllMusic | 3.5/5 stars |

1001° Centigrades was very well received by the press upon its initial release; more so than Kobaïa. Reviewing for Rock & Folk in July 1971, Yves Adrien left a very enthusiastic review about the band's originality, remarking "How can we say how masterful is the slap in the face that Magma delivers to mediocre French music, one that adapts or plagiarizes?" and "this record marks an immense improvement compared to Kobaïa, which was nevertheless itself a very great musical moment". G.L.B., reviewing for Jazz Hot, returned similar sentiments, remarking that "the songs leave no room for criticism: not a single dull moment. Everything is played to perfection and very well arranged."

Jean-Paul Commin of Best magazine awarded 1001° Centigrades the July 1971 album of the month award, remarking that "there was no contest" for their choice, praising the musical conception and spirit of the album, but also admitting it was chosen partly to compensate for Kobaïa's lack of earlier recognition, noting that listeners who enjoyed Centigrades would likely value the first just as highly.

== Track listing ==
Side one
| No. | Title | Writer(s) | Length |
|---|---|---|---|
| 1. | "Rïah Sahïltaahk" i. "Watseï Kobaïa" ii. "Di Mahntër Sahïltaahk" iii. "Süri Sï Toïdo" iv. "Ün Zoïn Glaö" v. "Ïss Walomëhn Dëm" vi. "Bradïa Ëtnah" vii. "Mem Loïlë" viii. "Wöleï" | Christian Vander | 21:45 |
| Total length: | | | 21:45 |

Side two
| No. | Title | Writer(s) | Length |
|---|---|---|---|
| 1. | "'Ïss' Lanseï Doïa" | Teddy Lasry | 11:46 |
| 2. | "Ki Ïahl Ö Lïahk" | François Cahen | 8:23 |
| Total length: | | | 20:09 (41:54) |

== Personnel ==
=== Magma ===
- Christian Vander – vocals, drums, percussion
- Klaus Blasquiz – vocals, percussion
- Teddy Lasry – clarinet, saxophone, flute, voice
- Yochk'o Seffer – saxophone, bass clarinet
- Louis Toesca – trumpet
- François Cahen – acoustic & electric pianos
- Francis Moze – bass

=== Production ===
- Roland Hilda - producer
- Dominique Blanc-Francard - engineer
- Louis Sarkissian - manager

== Literature ==
- Gonin, Philippe (2010), "1.001° Centigrades", Kobaïa la naissance d'un mythe (in French), Marseille: Le Mot et le Reste, pp. 135–142, ISBN 978-2-36054-000-6
