= Theusz Hamtaahk =

Theusz Hamtaahk - Trilogie au Trianon

Live album by Magma
- Released: 2001
- Recorded: 13 and 14 May 2000
- Length: 132:27
- Label: Seventh Records

Magma chronology
Theusz Hamtaahk - Trilogie au Trianon (2001)	Mythes et Légendes Epok 1 (2004)

Professional ratings
Review scores
Source	Rating
Allmusic	4.5/5 stars

Theusz Hamtaahk is a live album by the French rock band Magma, released in 2001. The album was recorded in 2000 over the course of two days during Magma's 30th anniversary shows at the Trianon theater, Paris, France and released both as a 3 audio CD box with a 16-page color booklet and libretti containing all the lyrics, and as a DVD. It is the first record to contain all three movements of the trilogy Theusz Hamtaahk:

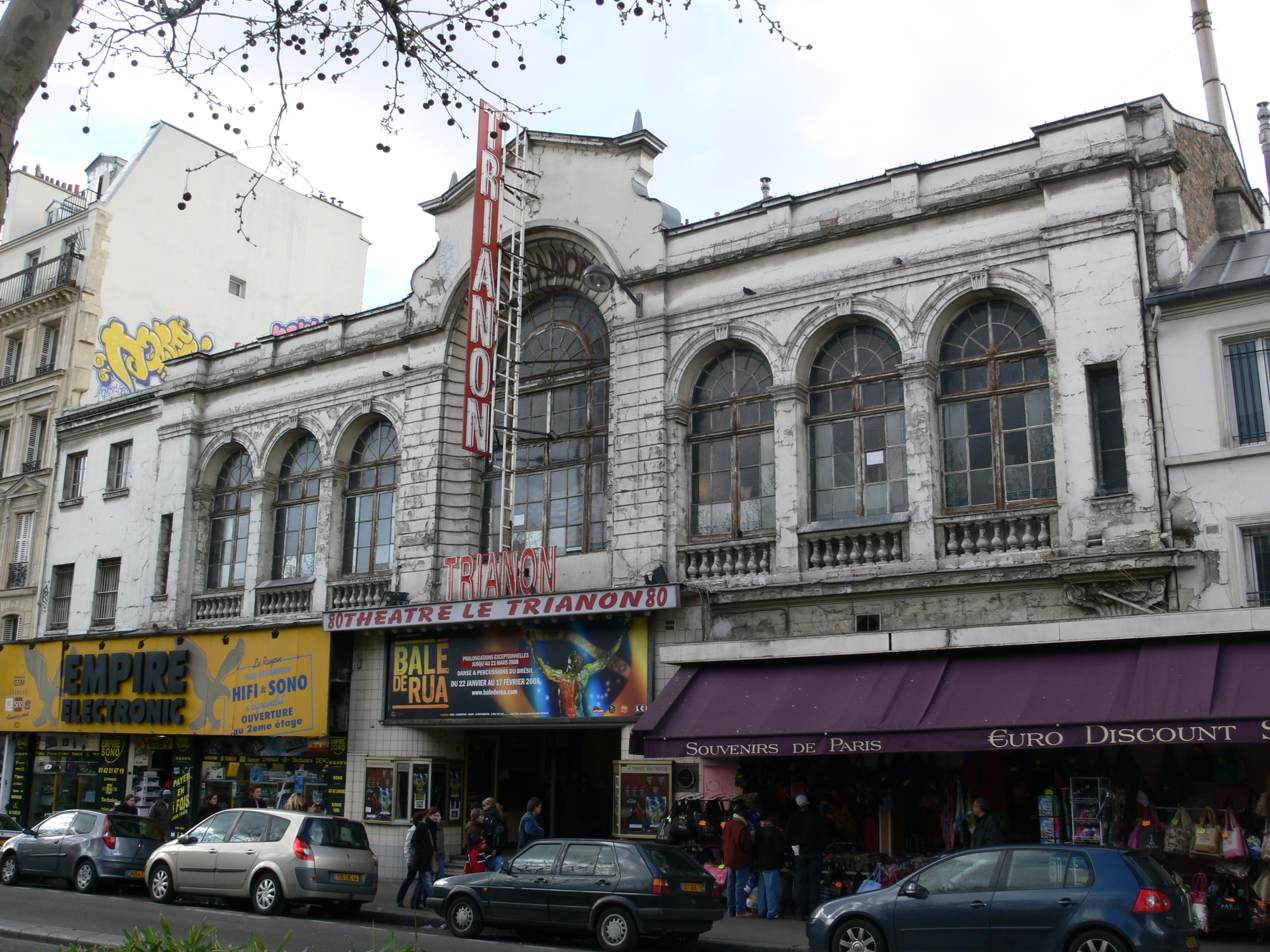
Location of the concert, Le Trianon, Paris, in 2008

- The first movement, "Theusz Hamtaahk" ("Time of Hatred"), had already been part of Magma's live repertoire since the mid-1970s and was first recorded "live" in a London BBC studio session in 1974, but was not released on record until the 1981 live album Retrospektïẁ, recorded in 1980.
- The second movement, Ẁurdah Ïtah ("Dead Earth"), was released before by a core quartet of then Magma members in 1974 under the name of bandleader Christian Vander as a soundtrack studio album for Yvan Lagrange's 1972 avant-garde film Tristan et Iseult. Re-released on Magma's label Seventh in 1989, it is mostly regarded as a Magma album, though.
- The third movement, "Mëkanïk Dëstruktïẁ Kömmandöh", was first released as a Magma album in 1973, probably their most famous work.

The words to the music are sung completely in Magma's constructed language Kobaïan.

== Track listing ==
All tracks composed by Christian Vander.

=== CD 1 ===
First Movement: Theusz Hamtaahk

1. "Malaẁëlëkaahm" − 6:28
2. "Sëẁolahẁëhn öhn Zaïn" − 6:42
3. "Dëümb ʌëwëlëss dölëhn" − 3:52
4. "Zeuhl Ẁortz" − 2:28
5. "Ğorutz ẁaahrn" − 3:15
6. "Tü lü lï ʌë üi dü wiï" − 1:08
7. "Sé Lah Maahrï Donsaï" − 2:31
8. "Slibenli dëh Theusz" − 5:21
9. "Zortsüng" − 3:09

=== CD 2 ===
Second Movement: Ẁurdah Ïtah

1. "Malaẁëlëkaahm (Incantation)" − 4:21
2. "Bradïa da zïmehn iëgah (L'initié a parlé)" − 2:35
3. "Manëh fur da Zëss (Ensemble pour le Maître)" − 1:42
4. "Fur dï Hël Kobaïa (Pour la vie eternelle)" − 5:38
5. "Blüm tendiwa (L'âme du peuple)" − 5:49
6. "Ẁohldünt mᴧëm dëwëlëss (Message dans l'étendue)" − 3:08
7. "Ẁaïnsaht !!! (En avant !!!)" − 3:11
8. "Ẁlasïk steuhn Kobaïa (Ascension vers l'éternel)" − 2:44
9. "Sëhnntëht dros ẁurdah süms (La mort n'est rien)" − 6:00
10. "C'est la vie qui les a menés là!" − 4:32
11. "Ëk sün da Zëss (Qui est le maître)" − 2:37
12. "De Zeuhl ündazïr (Vision de la musique céleste)" − 6:11

=== CD 3 ===
Third Movement: Mëkanïk Dëstruktïw Kömmandöh

1. "Hortz fur dëhn Štekëhn Ẁešt" − 10:16
2. "Ïma sürï Dondaï" − 4:13
3. "Kobaïa iss dëh hündïn" − 2:07
4. "Da Zeuhl Ẁortz Mëkanïk" − 7:20
5. "Nebëhr Gudahtt" − 7:39
6. "Mëkanïk Kömmandöh" − 8:05
7. "Kreühn Köhrmahn iss dëh Hündïn" − 1:30
8. "Da Zeuhl Ẁortz ẁaïnsaht (Hymne de la Zeuhl Ẁortz)" − 1:53
9. "Untitled (Joyeux Anniversaire)" − 5:41

== Personnel ==
- Stella Vander − vocals (all), Fender electric piano (CD 1), percussion (CD 2–3)
- Isabelle Feuillebois − vocals (all), percussion (CD 2)
- Jean-Christophe Gamet − vocals (all)
- Antoine Paganotti − vocals (all), Fender electric piano (CD 1, CD 3)
- Emmanuel Borghi − Fender electric piano (all)
- James Mac Gaw − guitar (CD 1, CD 3), Fender electric piano (CD 2), vocals (CD 2)
- Philippe Bussonnet − bass (all)
- Christian Vander − drums (all)
- Claude Lamamy − vocals (CD 2–3)
- Julie Vander − vocals (CD 2–3)
- Benoît Gaudiche − trumpet (CD 3)
- Yannick Neveu − trumpet (CD 3)
- Fred Burgazzi − trombone (CD 3)
- Ronan Simon − trombone (CD 3)

== Literature ==
- Gonin, Philippe (2010), "Theusz Hamtaahk", Magma - Décryptage d'un mythe et d'une musique (in French), Marseille: Le Mot et le Reste, pp. 265–266, ISBN 978-2-36054-000-6
