= Holiday Airlines =

Turkish charter airline

IATA	ICAO	Call sign
HW	HLD	-
- Founded: 1994
- Ceased operations: 1996

Holiday Airlines was a Turkish charter company that operated between 1994 and 1996.

== History ==
Holiday Airlines in Turkey began operations in the summer of 1994 using Airbus A320 aircraft serving mostly the German tourist market. Holiday Airlines also leased some Airbus A300s for short periods of time. By the end of 1994, Holiday Airlines had to temporarily cease operations when two of the A320s were repossessed, but their services were recommenced in 1995 using two Airbus A300B4.

Holiday Airlines was in such need of aircraft to meet the demand that they used the Boeing 727-200, the Tupolev Tu-154 and the Yakovlev Yak-42. The Birgenair crash off the Dominican Republic affected Holiday Airlines along with most Turkish charter airlines negatively and by September 1996, Holiday Airlines was refused rights to fly to Germany. By November 1996, it ceased all operations. They became the last airline in Turkey, to operate Yakolev Yak-42.

== Fleet ==
- Airbus A320
- Airbus A300
- Airbus A310
- Boeing 727-200/Adv.
- Yakovlev Yak-42
- Tupolev Tu-154M
- Boeing 737-200
- Lockheed L-1011 Tristar

== Gallery ==
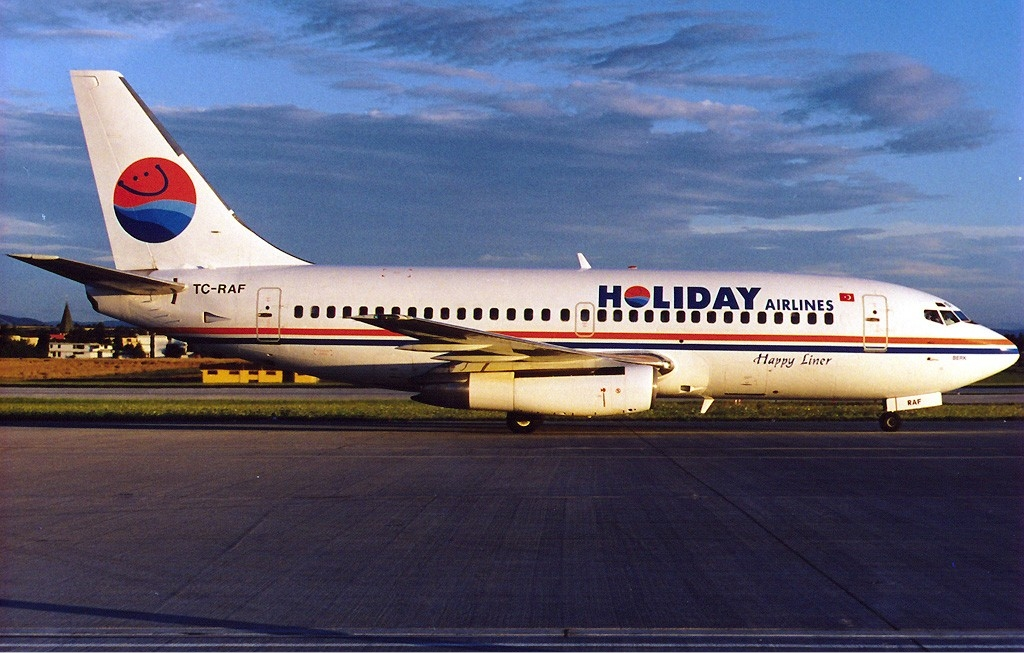
Holiday Airlines Boeing 737-200, Stuttgart, 1996

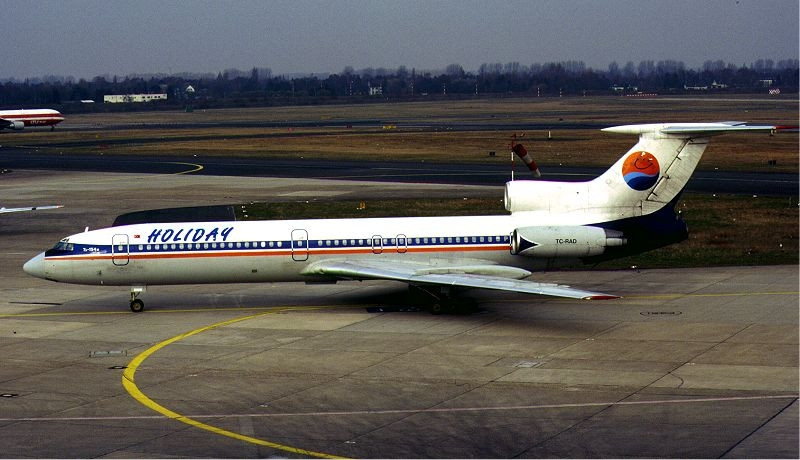
Holiday Airlines Tupolev Tu-154M

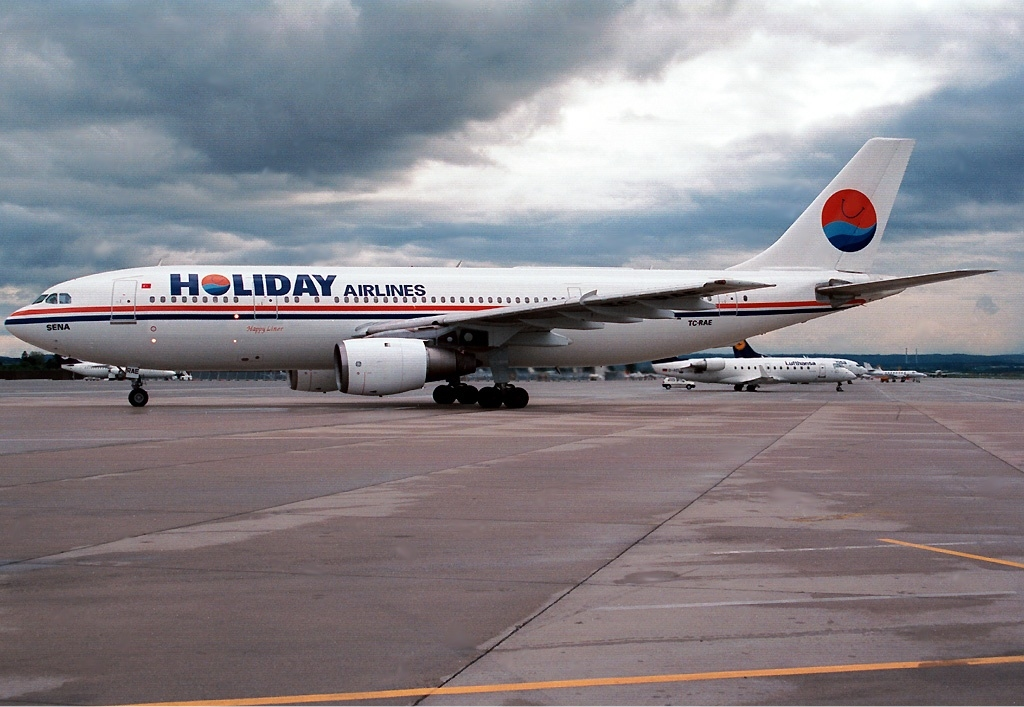
Holiday Airlines Airbus A300

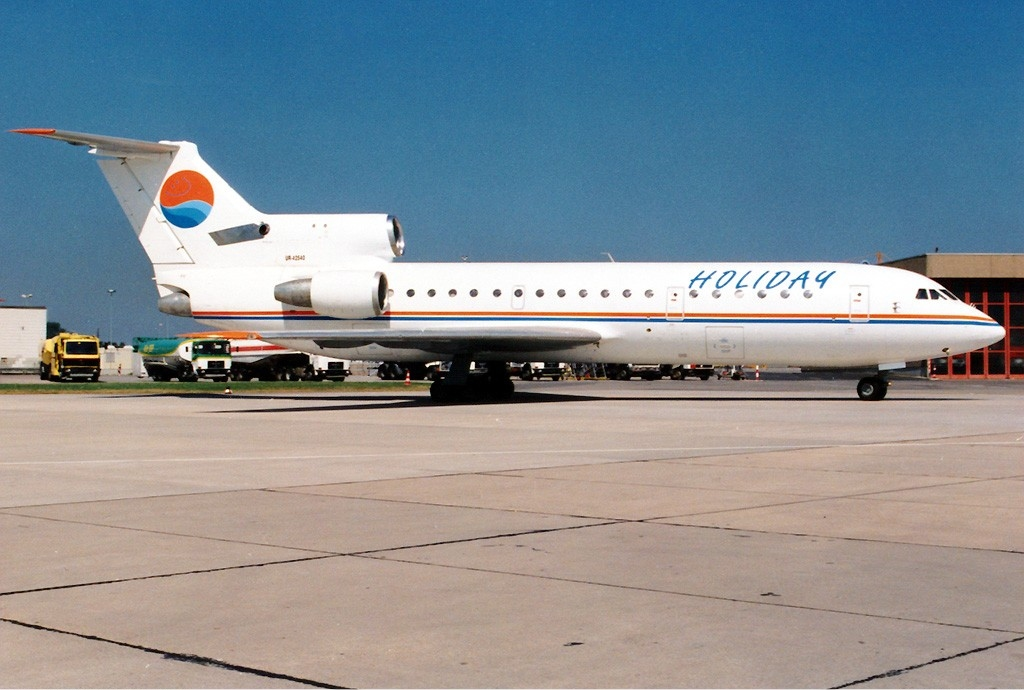
Holiday Airlines Yakovlev Yak-42D
