= Simon Halliday (Suffolk cricketer) =

English cricketer

Personal information
- Full name: Simon John Halliday
- Born: 23 October 1958 (age 68); Ipswich, Suffolk, England
- Batting: Right-handed
- Role: Wicket-keeper

Domestic team information
- Years: Team
- 1986–1997: Suffolk

Career statistics
| Competition | List A |
|---|---|
| Matches | 5 |
| Runs scored | 18 |
| Batting average | 3.60 |
| 100s/50s | –/– |
| Top score | 13 |
| Catches/stumpings | 1/1 |
- Source: Cricinfo, 11 July 2019

Simon John Halliday (born 23 October 1958) is an English former cricketer.

Halliday made his debut in List A one-day cricket for Suffolk against Nottinghamshire at Trent Bridge in the 1987 NatWest Trophy. He made four further List A appearances for Suffolk, the last coming against Gloucestershire in the 1995 NatWest Trophy. He scored just 18 runs in these five matches. He also played minor counties cricket for Suffolk from 1986–1997, making 73 appearances in the Minor Counties Championship and nine appearances in the MCCA Knockout Trophy. He scored 2,939 runs in the Minor Counties Championship, at an average of 25.11 and a high score of 113. He later became the master in charge of cricket at Harrow School. He was touring Sri Lanka in December 2004 with a team from Harrow, when he survived the Boxing Day Tsunami by climbing the pavilion at the Galle International Stadium along with fifteen boys from the touring party.
