= Holliday, Pennsylvania =

Unincorporated community in Pennsylvania, US

- Unincorporated community
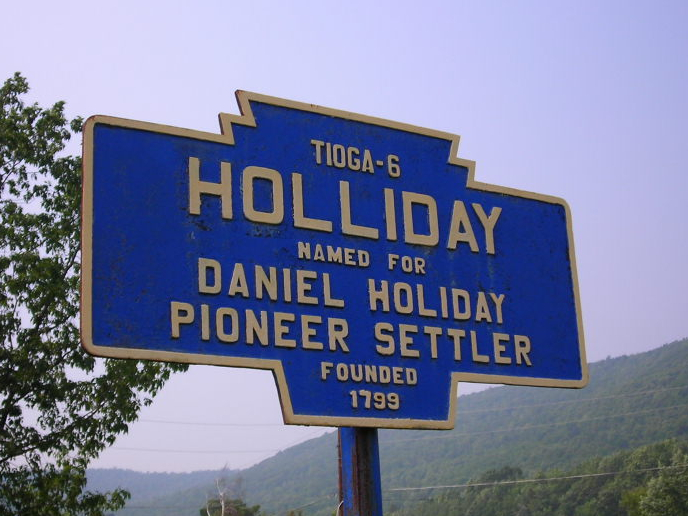
- Keystone marker
- Interactive map of Holliday, Pennsylvania
- Coordinates: 40°11′38.33″N 76°58′26.91″W
- Country: United States
- State: Pennsylvania
- County: Cumberland
- Elevation: 518 ft (158 m)
- Time zone: UTC-5 (Eastern (EST))
  - Summer (DST): UTC-4 (EDT)
- GNIS Feature ID: 1202025

Holliday is an unincorporated community in Cumberland County, Pennsylvania, United States.
