= Rebecca Parris =

American singer (1951–2018)

- Born: Ruth Blair MacCloskey; December 28, 1951; Newton, Massachusetts, U.S.
- Died: June 17, 2018 (aged 66) South Yarmouth, Massachusetts
- Genres: Jazz
- Occupation: Singer
- Years active: 1985–2018
- Website: rebeccaparris.com

Rebecca Parris (born Ruth Blair MacCloskey; December 28, 1951 – June 17, 2018) was an American jazz singer. During her career she appeared with Count Basie, Buddy Rich, Wynton Marsalis, Gary Burton, and Dizzy Gillespie. She performed at the Monterey Jazz Festival, North Sea Jazz Festival, Oslo Jazz Festival, and the International Floating Jazz Festival. She won the Boston Music Awards nine times.

== Early life ==
Born Ruth Blair MacCloskey in Newton, Massachusetts, Parris was the youngest of three daughters born to musicians Edmund M. MacCloskey and Shirley Robinson, and the niece of vocal coach Blair McCloskey (Note: Parris makes a point of explaining to the interviewer that her father and uncle disagreed on the correct spelling of their family name.). She derived her stage names, respectively, from her own nickname, Becky (acquired early in life owing to her perceived resemblance to the title character of Rebecca of Sunnybrook Farm), and from the Cole Porter song "I Love Paris".

== Critical reception ==
"I hear a little Carmen McRae when I listen to Rebecca", said Ron DellaChiesa, the jazz disk jockey at WGBH in Boston. "And a little Sarah Vaughan. I think she's on that level".

"Sarah Vaughan and Carmen McRae were my friends while they were alive, and it was a huge blessing to know them," said Parris. "And being accepted as one of them was huge".

== Death ==
On June 17, 2018, Parris died at the age of 66.

== Discography ==
Year	Title	Label
1984	A Passionate Fling	Shira
1990	Love Comes and Goes	Entertainment Exclusives
1993	Spring	Musicmasters
1994	A Beautiful Friendship	Altenburgh
1994	It's Another Day with Gary Burton	GRP
1998	Live at Chan's	Shira
1999	Double Rainbow	Shira
2001	My Foolish Heart	Koch
2002	The Secret of Christmas	Shira
2007	You Don't Know Me	Saying It with Jazz
