= Michael Frederick Halliday =

English painter

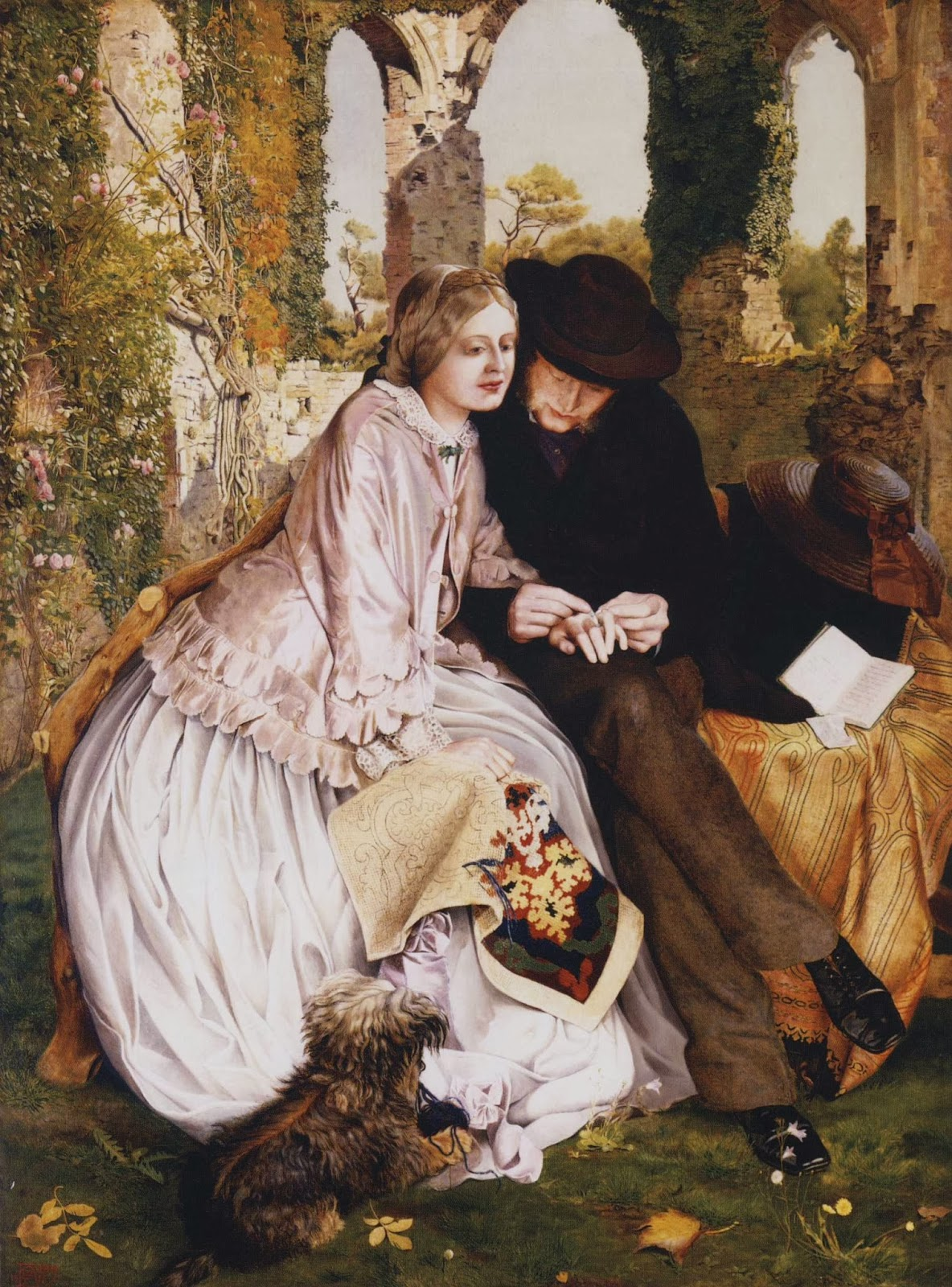
The Measure of the Wedding (1855)

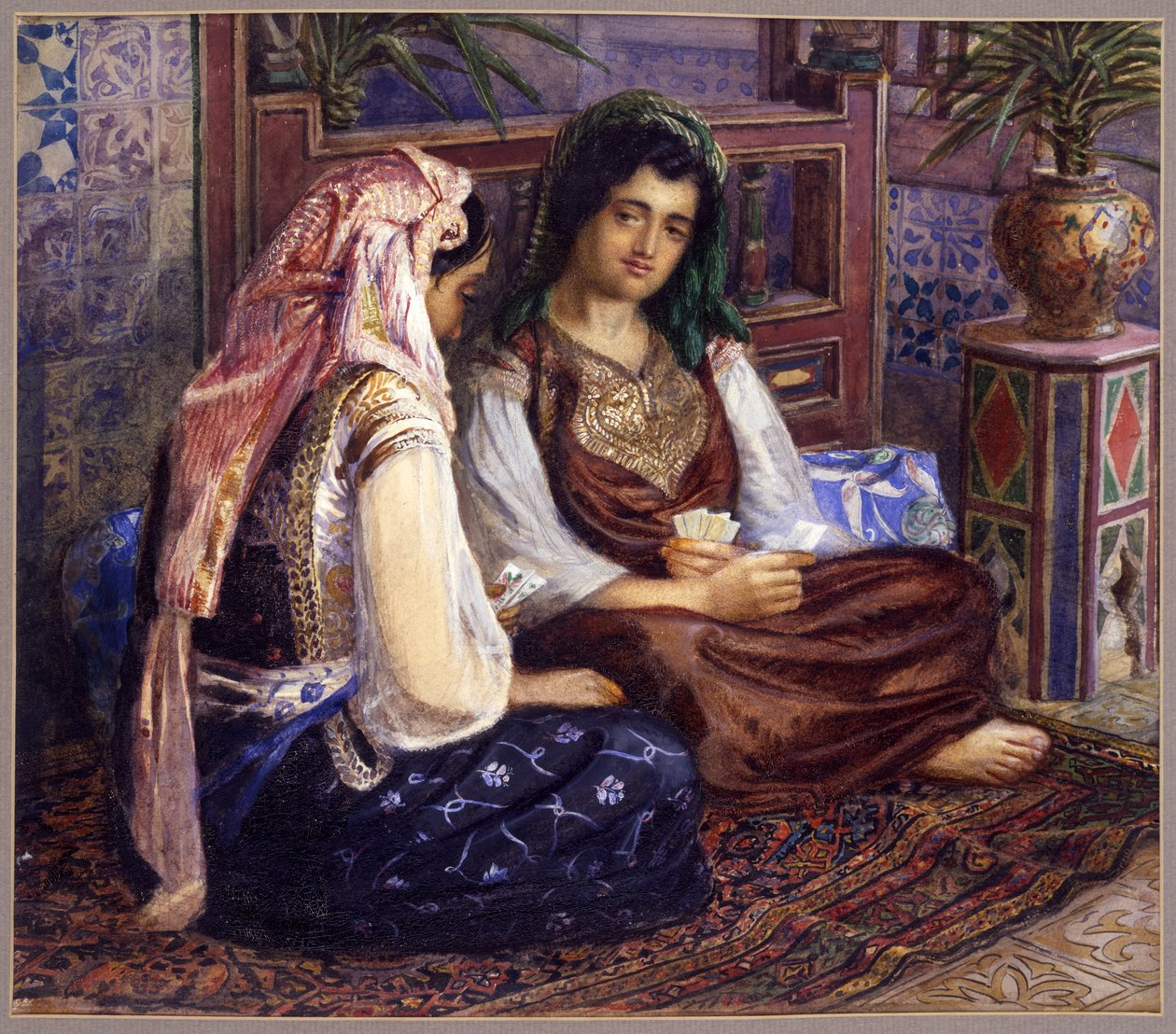
Algiers (1864)

Michael Frederick Halliday (c. 1822–1869) was an English amateur artist.

== Life ==
Michael Halliday, son of a captain in the navy, from 1839 until his death was a clerk in the parliament office, House of Lords. He cultivated a taste for painting in later years with much energy and fair success.

He exhibited at the Royal Academy in 1853 a view of Moel Shabod from the Capel Curig Road. In 1856 he exhibited The Measure for the Wedding Ring, and two scenes from the Crimean War; the former attracted much notice and was engraved. He exhibited in 1857 The Sale of a Heart, in 1858 The Blind Basket-maker with his First Child, in 1864 A Bird in the Hand, and in 1866 Roma vivente e Roma morta. He contributed an etching of The Plea of the Midsummer Fairies to the edition of Hood's Poems published by the Junior Etching Club in 1858.

Halliday was one of the earliest members of the Pre-Raphaelite school of painting. He was also an enthusiastic volunteer, a first-rate rifle-shot, and one of the first English Eight who competed for the Elcho Shield at Wimbledon in 1862.

He died after a short illness at Thurloe Place, South Kensington, on 1 June 1869, and was buried at Brompton Cemetery.
