= Margaret Halliday =

New Zealand-Australian motorsport racer (born 1956)

Margaret Halliday (born 1956) is a New Zealand-born Australian motorsport racer. She was the first woman to win an Australian national motor sport Grand Prix.

== Biography ==
Halliday was born in 1956 in New Zealand. She worked as a secretary in Sydney, New South Wales, Australia.

Halliday partnered with her then boyfriend Doug Chivas in road races throughout the 1970s and 1980s. The couple had met in Pukekohe, Auckland Region, New Zealand. In 1984, Halliday became the first woman to win an Australian national motorsport Grand Prix, while partnered with Chivas in the 1000cc motorcycle side-car Grand Prix at the Mount Panorama Circuit in Bathurst, New South Wales, Australia.

In 2025, Halliday was the featured story on an episode of the Aussie Sidecar Stories podcast.
