= William Holliday =

William Holliday may refer to:

- William Holliday (merchant) (c. 1565–1624), London merchant and chairman of the East India Company
- William Holliday (rugby league) (born 1939), English rugby league player
- William H. Holliday (1843–1925), American politician in the Wyoming Legislature

== See also ==
- William Halliday (disambiguation)
