= Captain Will Hollyday =

Will Hollyday (died 22 December 1697) was Captain of the Ragged Regiment of the Black Guards. He eventually resigned his commission and became a highwayman, for which he was executed on 22 December 1697.
