= Halladay Farmhouse =

Historic house in New York, United States

- U.S. National Register of Historic Places
- Location within New York Location within the United States
- Location: US 20, Duanesburg, New York
- Coordinates: 42°45′59″N 74°12′49″W
- Area: 92 acres (37 ha)
- Built: 1786
- Architectural style: Greek Revival, Vernacular Greek Revival
- MPS: Duanesburg MRA
- NRHP reference No.: 84003213
- Added to NRHP: October 11, 1984

Halladay Farmhouse is a historic home located at Duanesburg in Schenectady County, New York. It was built about 1786 and remodeled in the 1830s in a vernacular Greek Revival style. It is a 1 1/2-story, five-bay frame building with a small 1-story gable-roofed wing. It features a wide frieze pierced by rectangular eyebrow windows with ornate iron grillwork. Also on the property are two contributing barns, a carriage house, two sheds, and a machine shop building.

The property was covered in a 1984 study of Duanesburg historical resources. It was listed on the National Register of Historic Places in 1984.
