= John Halliday =

John Halliday may refer to:

- John Halliday (actor) (1880–1947), American actor
- John Halliday (ophthalmologist) (1871–1946), Australian doctor
- John Halliday (footballer) (born 1880), English professional footballer
- John Halliday (died 1805) (c. 1737–1805), British politician who sat in the House of Commons from 1775 to 1784
- John Halliday (died 1754) (c. 1709–1754), British politician who sat in the House of Commons in 1754
- John Halliday (cricketer) (1915–1945), English cricketer

== See also ==
- Jon Halliday (born 1939), British historian
- Johnny Hallyday (1943–2017), stage name of French singer and actor Jean-Philippe Smet
- Johnny Holiday
