= Martin Halliday =

British physician

Anthony Martin Halliday (19 August 1926 – 18 March 2008) was a British physician and consultant in clinical neurophysiology. He worked most of his career at the National Hospital for Neurology and Neurosurgery in London.

== Career ==
Halliday was born on 19 August 1926 in Liverpool to William Reginald Halliday and Edith Hilda (née Macneile Dixon). His family history included numerous ancestors working in the field of medicine. Halliday was schooled at Dauntsey's School, he studied medicine at the University of Glasgow where he graduated in 1949. In 1950 he did his national service where he worked for the British Army physiological section. Halliday worked on finger tremor physiology, which seemed to be linked to sleepiness. His research was valuable as British pilots at times fell asleep while flying round the clock for the Berlin airlift. As such, it was noticed by Arnold Carmichael, the director of the neurophysiology unit of the National Hospital. Carmichael persuaded Halliday to come work at the National when he finished his national service in 1953. At first Halliday joined a research team, in 1961 he became a consultant in clinical neurophysiology and became the head of his own Medical Research Council.

Halliday became interested in changes in brainwave patterns, caused by stimulation of the senses. He became best known for his work on pattern-reversal visual evoked potential. With Ian McDonald he developed a technique which led to laboratory tests for the diagnosis of multiple sclerosis.

In 1989 he became a Fellow of the Royal College of Physicians. He became a foreign member of the Royal Netherlands Academy of Arts and Sciences in 1991.

Halliday died on 28 March 2008, aged 81, after having suffered from pulmonary fibrosis.
