= John Holliday (pioneer) =

John Holliday was an early American pioneer who was the first white settler to build a cabin along a cove on Harmon Creek in what was once Brooke County, West Virginia (formerly western Virginia) but today is Hancock County, West Virginia. The town of Hollidays Cove was named after John Holliday and was officially founded in 1793.

== See also ==
- Hollidays Cove
- Hancock County, West Virginia
- Weirton, West Virginia
