= Thomas Halliday (cricketer) =

English cricketer

Thomas Maxwell Halliday (1 July 1904 – 28 February 1977) was an English cricketer active from 1924 to 1929 who played for Lancashire. He was born and died in Leyland, Lancashire. He appeared in 41 first-class matches as a righthanded batsman, scoring 996 runs with a highest score of 109* and held twelve catches.
