= Lee Halliday =

American singer and producer (1927–2023)

- Born: Lemoine Gardner Ketcham; December 25, 1927; Sapulpa, Oklahoma, U.S.
- Died: September 5, 2023 (aged 95); Marseille, France
- Occupations: Singer, producer

Lemoine Gardner Ketcham (December 25, 1927 – September 5, 2023), better known as Lee Halliday, was an American singer, dancer, and record producer.

== Biography ==
Born in Sapulpa, Oklahoma on December 25, 1927, Ketcham became a singer and dancer in music hall productions under the name "Lee Halliday". He met the Menen and Desta Mar sisters, who were dancers and paternal cousins of Johnny Hallyday, during a tour in London, with whom he formed an acrobatic dance trio called "The Hallydays". He married Desta, but later divorced her in the 1970s. The couple had two children: daughter Carol-Makéda Ketcham, and son Michael Ketcham Halliday.

Ketcham met Johnny Hallyday while on tour with the Mar sisters. The two formed a "father and son" bond for life. Hallyday chose his stage name after choosing a rock career inspired by Elvis Presley and Ketcham's stage name. Ketcham became Hallyday's agent after the latter signed with Philips Records in 1961. He produced almost all of Hallyday's songs from 1961 to 1975. His name last appeared on a Johnny Hallyday album in 1979, Pavillon de Paris : Porte de Pantin.

Aside from Johnny Hallyday, Ketcham also worked as an artistic producer for the likes of Les Lionceaux, Herbert Léonard, Nanette Workman, Lucky Blondo, and William Sheller.

Lee Halliday lived in London with his wife until her death in 2018. He then joined his daughter in Marseille, where he died on September 5, 2023, at the age of 95.

== Publications ==
- Lee Hallyday raconte Johnny (1964)
- Johnny Hallyday, l'enfance d'une star (2000)
