= Best (music magazine) =

Prominent French popular music magazine

- March 1973 issue
- Editor-in-Chief: David S. Kane
- Categories: Music magazine
- Frequency: Monthly
- First issue: 1968
- Final issue: 1999
- Country: France
- Based in: Paris
- Language: French

Best (music magazine) was a prominent French popular music magazine founded in 1968 by Jacques Morlain and Gérard Bernar. It was published in Paris and their building was located rue d’Antin (road Antin). Editor in chief were Jacques Morlain, Gérard Bernar, Sacha Reins, Christian Lebrun, Francis Dordor, Jean Pierre Sabouret and Christophe Geoffette.

In the 1970s, the magazine became highly successful with more than 100,000 issues sold a month. Christian Lebrun was then the editor-in-Chief. When the magazine embraced the New Wave music with acts such as The Clash, Motörhead, AC/DC, Sex Pistols, The Stray Cats, The Pretenders, Police, Devo in the late 1970s, they managed to sell 185,000 issues a month.
