= Tom Holliday =

Tom or Thomas Holliday may refer to:

- Tom Holliday (baseball) (born 1953), American college baseball coach
- Tom Holliday (rugby) (1898–1969), English rugby union and rugby league footballer
- Thomas C. Holliday (1890–1940), American football player and coach
