= William Reginald Halliday =

British historian and archaeologist (1886–1966)

Sir William Reginald Halliday

Sir William Reginald Halliday (26 September 1886 – 25 November 1966) was a historian and archaeologist who served as Principal of King's College London from 1928 to 1952.

Born in British Honduras in 1886, Halliday was educated at Winchester College and New College, Oxford graduating with a first in Literae Humaniores. He also spent time studying at the Berlin University and at the British School at Athens. He lectured in Greek History and Archaeology and the University of Glasgow (1911–1914) before becoming Rathbone Professor of Ancient History at the University of Liverpool (1914–1928). He was then made Principal of King's College London in 1928, and remained in the post until 1952. He was knighted in 1946. His son Martin Halliday (1926–2008) became a neurophysiologist at the National Hospital for Neurology and Neurosurgery. He is buried in the churchyard of St Mary at Oare, Somerset.

Academic offices
Preceded by Sir Ernest Barker	Principal of King's College London; 1928–1952	Succeeded by Sir Peter Noble
