= Johnny Holiday (actor) =

American actor

- Born: John Taube; October 28, 1912; San Francisco, California, US
- Died: February 28, 2009 (aged 96); Los Angeles, California, US

Johnny Holiday (October 28, 1912 – February 28, 2009) was an American actor who entered the field of acting at the age of 87.

== Biography ==
A former barkeep, Holiday (born John Taube) came out of a 25-year retirement, first appearing in print ads; later starting an acting career when he was nearly 90 years old. Taube was reportedly inspired by a photographer who told him that he would be great in film.
