= James Bagwell =

American conductor (born 1966)

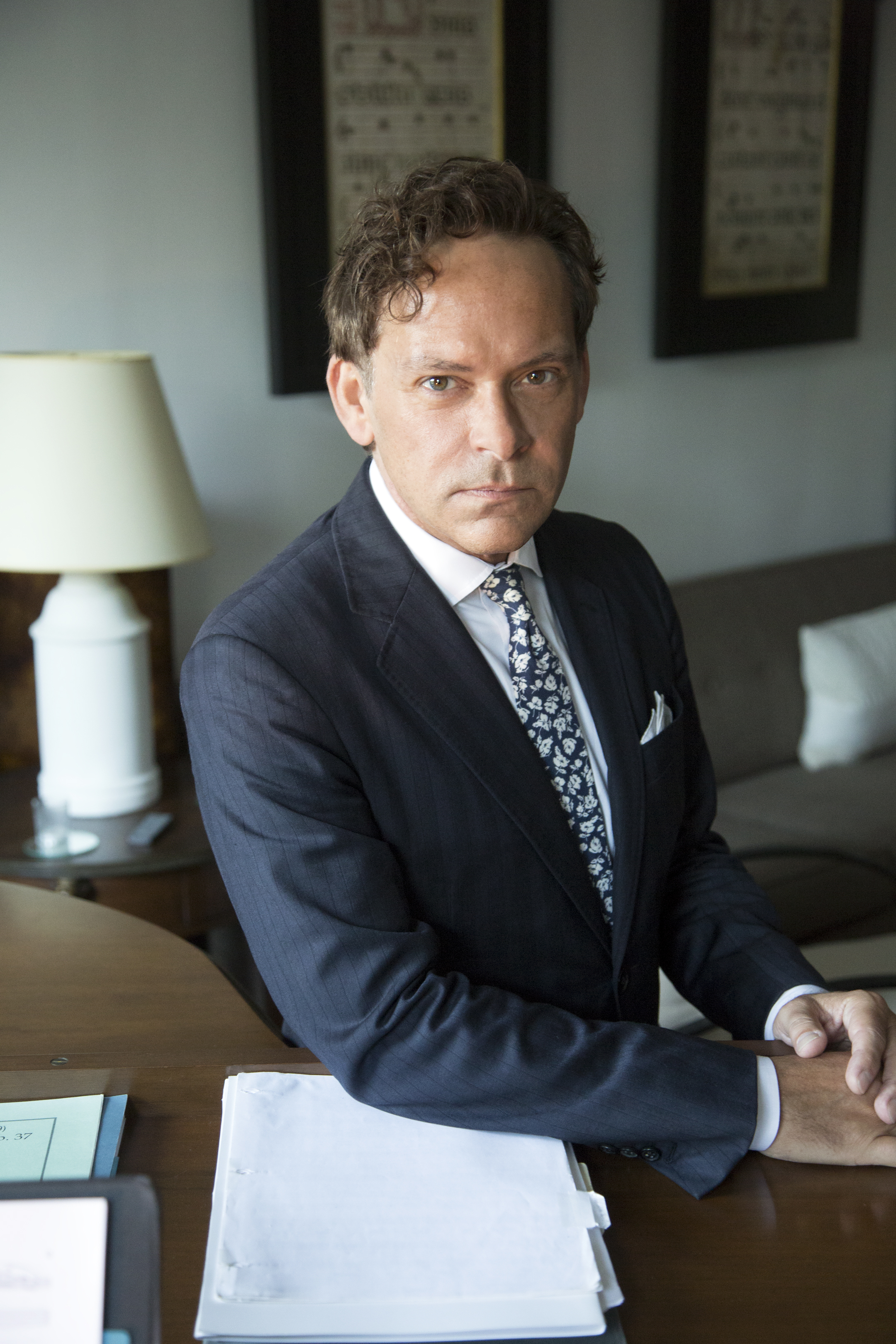
- Born: James Bagwell; January 4, 1966
- Education: Birmingham-Southern College; Florida State University; Indiana University
- Occupations: academic; composer; conductor; arranger
- Organizations: Asheville School; Asheville Symphony Orchestra; Indianapolis Chamber Orchestra; Cincinnati Symphony Orchestra; Cincinnati Pops Orchestra; Light Opera Oklahoma; Dessoff Choirs; Bard College Conservatory of Music; Tulsa Symphony

James Bagwell (born January 4, 1966) is an American conductor and academic, serving as professor of music at Bard College in Annandale-on-Hudson, New York. At Bard, he also holds roles as director of the music program and director of performance studies at the Bard College Conservatory of Music, and co-director of the graduate program in conducting. He has been director of choruses for the Bard Music Festival since 2003.

== Education ==
Bagwell received a Bachelor of Music Education in Piano from Birmingham-Southern College. He earned a Master of Music in Musicology and a Master of Music Education in Choral Conducting from Florida State University. He later completed a Doctor of Music in Choral Conducting at Indiana University in 1999, with minor fields in music literature, music history, and twentieth-century cultural studies.

== Career ==
Bagwell held early positions in music education and choral conducting, including director of music at the Asheville School, where he oversaw the school's music program and taught courses in music and applied performance. He also served as assistant conductor of the Asheville Symphony Chorus.

He founded and directed the Indianapolis Chamber Singers and held leadership roles with the Indianapolis Symphonic Choir, including artistic director and principal guest conductor. He additionally was the music director of the May Festival Summer Chorus in Cincinnati, performing with ensembles associated with the Cincinnati Symphony Orchestra and Cincinnati Pops Orchestra.

He was the long-time conductor of the May Festival Youth Chorus in Cincinnati since 1997.

From 2000 to 2008, Bagwell was music director of Light Opera Oklahoma, where he conducted a range of operatic and musical theatre productions presented in repertory.

He later was the music director of the Dessoff Choirs from 2005 to 2010 and music director of the Collegiate Chorale (2009–2015). In these roles, he conducted performances at venues including Carnegie Hall and prepared ensembles for performances of both standard and less frequently performed works. His repertoire in these positions included operas and large-scale choral works by composers such as Bellini, Rossini, Boito, Philip Glass, and Osvaldo Golijov.

For example, in November 2011 he conducted a concert performance of Rossini's opera Moïse et Pharaon with the American Symphony Orchestra and the Collegiate Chorale at Carnegie Hall in New York. The cast included James Morris, Marina Rebeka, Angela Meade, Eric Cutler, and Kyle Ketelsen.

Bagwell has been affiliated with Bard College since 2000. He is professor of music and director of the music program at Bard College, director of performance studies at the Bard College Conservatory of Music, and co-director of the Graduate Program in Conducting. He has was the director of choruses for the Bard Music Festival since 2003.

In 2026, Bagwell was appointed principal conductor of the Tulsa Symphony and principal conductor of the Berkshire Bach Orchestra and Chorus. He has also was associate conductor of The Orchestra Now (TŌN) and principal guest conductor of the American Symphony Orchestra. He has conducted both ensembles in performances at major venues including Carnegie Hall and Lincoln Center in New York City.

Bagwell has appeared as a guest conductor with orchestras in the United States and internationally, including the Indianapolis Chamber Orchestra and the Jerusalem Symphony. He has maintained ongoing engagements with the Berkshire Bach Orchestra and Chorus.

Since 2011, he has collaborated regularly with singer-songwriter Natalie Merchant, conducting performances with orchestras across North America, including the Atlanta Symphony Orchestra, San Francisco Symphony, Seattle Symphony, Nashville Symphony, National Symphony Orchestra, and Orchestra of St. Luke's.

Bagwell conducted a reduced Cincinnati Symphony Orchestra and the May Festival Chorus in a performance of Messiah that was noted for its energy and interpretive clarity, contributing to a compelling and well-received presentation.

=== Opera and orchestral repertoire ===
Bagwell's repertoire includes operatic and symphonic works performed in concert and staged settings. Productions he has conducted include works by Richard Strauss, Sondheim, Lehár, Janáček, Bernstein, Offenbach, Puccini, and Mascagni.

He has also conducted large-scale choral-orchestral works including Beethoven's Missa solemnis, Brahms's Ein deutsches Requiem, Mahler symphonies, Britten's War Requiem, and Handel's Messiah.

=== Choral preparation ===
He has prepared choruses for ensembles including the New York Philharmonic, Boston Symphony Orchestra, San Francisco Symphony, NHK Symphony Orchestra, Saint Petersburg Symphony Orchestra, Budapest Festival Orchestra, Cincinnati Pops Orchestra, and Indianapolis Symphony Orchestra.

He has collaborated with conductors such as Gustavo Dudamel, Riccardo Muti, Michael Tilson Thomas, Esa-Pekka Salonen, Zubin Mehta, Yannick Nézet-Séguin, Andris Nelsons, Valery Gergiev, and others.

His preparation work has included choral-orchestral repertoire such as Ligeti's Requiem, Schoenberg's Gurre-Lieder, Mahler symphonies, and works by Brahms, Mozart, and Bernstein.

== Academic work ==
Bagwell's academic research includes a doctoral dissertation titled Innovation and Synthesis: The Psalm Settings of Charles Ives (Indiana University, 1999). His earlier academic training included studies in American music and sacred harp traditions.
