= Robert Bass (conductor) =

American conductor (1953–2008)

Robert Bass

Robert H Bass (4 August 1953 – 25 August 2008) was an American conductor who notably served as the music director of the Collegiate Chorale in New York City for almost three decades. Bass studied conducting at Mannes College The New School for Music under Richard Westenburg, who was the Collegiate Chorale's director at that time. In 1979, at the age of 26, he succeeded Westenburg in the position, making his conducting debut at Carnegie Hall with the choir that year.

Bass continued leading the Collegiate Chorale up until his death. During his tenure he conducted the ensemble in several noteworthy performances at Carnegie Hall, including the New York premiere of Richard Strauss's Friedenstag with the Orchestra of St. Luke's in 1997, the United States premiere of Dvořák's Dimitrij, and the American premiere of Handel's Giove in Argo. Other notable works he presented to New York audiences with the Collegiate Chorale included Respighi's La fiamma and Puccini's Turandot with the new ending by Luciano Berio. He also recorded and performed two of Beethoven's cantatas, Der Glorreiche Augenblick and Auf die Erhebung Leopold des Zwieten zur Kaiserwürde with sopranos Deborah Voigt and Elizabeth Futral. Other notable singers to sing under Bass's baton included Vinson Cole, David Daniels, Lauren Flanigan, Maria Guleghina, Hei-Kyung Hong, Salvatore Licitra, and Alessandra Marc, all of them in their debuts at Carnegie Hall.

Bass also worked frequently as a guest conductor. He conducted performances with the New York City Opera, the Columbus Symphony Orchestra, the Nebraska Chamber Orchestra, and the Concert Association of Greater Miami. He also conducted numerous large choral works at Carnegie Hall, including Requiems by Brahms, Verdi, Mozart and Fauré, Beethoven's Missa Solemnis, Rossini's Stabat Mater, Bach's Mass in B Minor, Bernstein's Mass, Handel's Messiah and Mendelssohn's Elijah.
