= Dessoff Choirs =

American independent chorus

The Dessoff Choirs
- Origin: New York City, New York, United States
- Genres: Choral music
- Years active: 1924-present
- Members: Malcolm J. Merriweather; Steven W. Ryan (accompanist)
- Website: www.dessoff.org

The Dessoff Choirs is an independent chorus based in New York City. Margarete Dessoff established the organization in 1930 as the union of two choirs she directed, the Adesdi chorus and the A Cappella Singers, whence the plural Choirs. Today, the plural connotes Dessoff's various ensembles, which range from the large Dessoff Symphonic Choir, which appears with major orchestras, to the Dessoff Chamber Choir, which performs in more intimate settings.

The performance of new, unusual, or rarely heard works is a central facet of Dessoff's mission. Under Dessoff's baton, the Dessoff Choirs gave many premieres, including the American premiere of Arnold Schoenberg's Friede auf Erden, the first American performance of Orazio Vecchi's L'Amfiparnaso, and the New York premiere of Bach's cantata Christ lag in Todes Banden. Dessoff's second conductor, Paul Boepple, continued to champion early music, and when he retired after 32 years as musical director, early music had seen its modern renaissance in which Dessoff had played a significant role. In 1951, the Dessoff Choirs performed with the New York Wind Ensemble at a special Peabody Mason Concert series commemorating the Bi-Millennial year in Paris. During Boepple's tenure, the Choirs released 13 recordings, and his editions were published by Theodore Presser as the Dessoff Choir Series.

== Recent history ==
From 2005 through 2010, James Bagwell served as the musical director of Dessoff. Under his direction, Dessoff performed several large works not often heard, including Kurt Weill's Berliner Requiem, Paul Hindemith's Apparebit repentina dies, and William Bolcom's The Mask. In addition, Bagwell expanded Dessoff's repertoire with regard to American music, including in the choir's concerts Sacred Harp music and American music from the 18th and 21st centuries. Dessoff's May 2009 concert, which included works by Charles Ives and his teacher Horatio Parker, was recorded live and released on CD and by mp3 download in December 2009. In September 2009, Bagwell was named musical director of the Collegiate Chorale.

In June 2009, the Dessoff Symphonic Choir joined the New York Philharmonic and the New York Choral Artists for seven performances of two programs, Britten's War Requiem and Mahler's Symphony No. 8), marking Lorin Maazel's final concerts as music director of the Philharmonic, with Kent Tritle, the philharmonic's organist.

In November 2009, the Dessoff Chamber Choir performed songs from The Kinks Choral Collection with Ray Davies on the Late Show with David Letterman and at two Town Hall performances.

In May 2010, Christopher Shepard became the seventh music director of the Choirs, succeeded by Malcolm J. Merriweather in 2016. In its 2024–2025 season the Choirs marked its centennial with performances of Brahms' Ein deutsches Requiem and Florence Price's cantata Abraham Lincoln Walks at Midnight.

== 2010–2011 concert season ==
October 8–9, 2010, (Dessoff Symphonic Choir) Radio City Music Hall, Howard Shore's score to The Lord of the Rings: The Two Towers, performed during a live projection of the film. With the Brooklyn Youth Chorus and the 21st Century Symphony Orchestra, Ludwig Wicki conductor
November 21–22, 2010, St. James Church (Madison Ave. at 71st St.), French Masters from Josquin to Duruflé, Chris Shepard, conductor
November 24–28, 2010, (Dessoff Chamber Choir) East Coast tour with Ray Davies, The Kinks Choral Collection

November 24, 2010, The Beacon Theatre, New York
November 26, 2010, The Wellmont Theatre, Montclair, New Jersey
November 27, 2010, Verizon Hall, Philadelphia
November 28, 2010, Wilbur Theatre, Boston

December 13, 2010, (Dessoff Symphonic Choir) Avery Fisher Hall, Maurice Ravel's Daphnis et Chloé, with the Juilliard Orchestra, Yannick Nézet-Séguin, conductor
February 25, 2011, Church of St. Mary the Virgin, Arvo Pärt's Passio, Chris Shepard, conductor
May 14, 2011, St. George's Episcopal Church, Dance On! Music for Choirs, Pianos, and Percussion, Chris Shepard, conductor

== 2009–2010 concert season ==
November 12, 2009, Congregation Rodeph Sholom, Ernest Bloch's Sacred Service. Paolo Bordignon (organ), Charles Perry Sprawls (bass-baritone), James Bagwell, conductor
March 6, 2010, Merkin Concert Hall, Kyle Gann's Transcendental Sonnets (New York premiere), Harold Farberman's Talk (world premiere), and Lukas Foss's Psalms. James Bagwell (conductor)
March 28, 2010, Avery Fisher Hall, Beethoven's Symphony No. 9. Budapest Festival Orchestra, Iván Fischer, conductor
May 8, 2010, St. George's Episcopal Church, The Roots of Bach and Beyond. Patrick Dupré Quigley, guest conductor

== Dessoff Symphonic Choir performances ==
(2010) 21st Century Symphony Orchestra, Howard Shore's score to The Lord of the Rings: The Two Towers, Radio City Music Hall, Ludwig Wicki conductor (Official event web site)
(2010) Budapest Festival Orchestra, Beethoven's Ninth Symphony, Avery Fisher Hall, Iván Fischer, conductor (New York Times review)
(2009) New York Philharmonic, Mahler's Symphony No. 8, Avery Fisher Hall, Lorin Maazel, conductor
(2009) New York Philharmonic, Britten's War Requiem, Avery Fisher Hall, Lorin Maazel, conductor
(2009) Mahler's Symphony No. 3, Mahler for the children of AIDS benefit concert, Carnegie Hall, George Mathew, conductor
(2008) American Symphony Orchestra, Rued Langgaard's Music of the Spheres, Avery Fisher Hall, Leon Botstein, conductor
(2006) NHK Symphony Orchestra, Maurice Ravel's Daphnis et Chloé, Carnegie Hall, Vladimir Ashkenazy, conductor
(2006) American Symphony Orchestra, Rimsky-Korsakov's Mozart and Salieri, Avery Fisher Hall, Leon Botstein, conductor
(2006) San Francisco Symphony, Charles Ives's Holidays Symphony, Carnegie Hall, Michael Tilson Thomas, conductor
(2005) Tan Dun's Water Passion after St. Matthew, South Street Seaport, Tan Dun, conductor
(2004) Kronos Quartet, Terry Riley's Sun Rings, Brooklyn Academy of Music, Aaron Smith, conductor
(2004) John Tavener's The Veil of the Temple, Avery Fisher Hall, Stephen Layton, conductor
(2004) New York Philharmonic, Charles Ives's Symphony No. 4 and General William Booth Enters into Heaven, Avery Fisher Hall, Alan Gilbert, conductor

== Discography ==
Reflections: Four Contemporary American Composers Look Back (1997), The Dessoff Choirs, Kent Tritle, conductor

Paul Moravec: Songs of Love and War (first recording), David Arnold, baritone
Robert Convery: To the One of Fictive Music (first recording), Steven Ryan, Piano
Ned Rorem: From an Unknown Past
John Corigliano: Fern Hill (first recording of revised orchestration), Mary Ann Hart, mezzo-soprano

Glories on Glories (2009), The Dessoff Choirs, James Bagwell, conductor.

William Billings, Modern Music, Jordan, Chester (1781)
Horatio Parker, Urbs Syon unica (from Hora Novissima) - (1893)
Charles Ives, Psalm 67 (1897), Glories on Glories (1902), Psalm 90 (1924)
Randall Thompson, The Last Words of David (1949)
Henry Clay Work Marching Through Georgia/Battle Cry of Freedom (1865)/George F. Root (1862)
Tenting on the Old Camp Ground - Walter Kittredge (1864)
Oliver Holden, Ode on Music (1792)
Andrew Law, 'Bunker Hill' (1786)
J. H. Moss, Singing School (1865)
Miss M. Durham, Promised Land (1854)
Robert Lowry, Beautiful River (1864)
William Walker, Saints Bound for Heaven (1884)
John McCurry, Weeping Mary (1855)
Anonymous, Hallelujah (Original Sacred Harp, 1844)
A. Marcus Cagle, Soar Away (Original Sacred Harp, 1971)
