= Giove in Argo =

Opera by George Frideric Handel

- Opera by George Frideric Handel
- George Frideric Handel, portrayed by Balthasar Denner, 1729
- Translation: Jupiter in Argos
- Librettist: Antonio Maria Lucchini
- Language: Italian
- Premiere: 1 May 1739; King's Theatre, Haymarket, London

Giove in Argo (Jupiter in Argos, HWV A14) is an Italian opera by George Frideric Handel. It is one of Handel's three pasticcio works made up of music and arias from his previous operas. The libretto was written by Antonio Maria Lucchini. The opera was first performed at the King's Theatre, Haymarket, London, on 1 May 1739.

== History ==
The libretto by the Venetian poet Lucchini had been written for a setting by Antonio Lotti in Dresden in 1717. Handel might have heard Lotti's opera on his visit to Dresden in 1719, where the famous Senesino sang the part of Jupiter. Probably Handel took a copy of the text to England and remembered it in 1739 when he was looking for a libretto for a short pasticcio opera with three female characters in it.

Handel brought several pasticci to the London stage. In most cases he adapted successful works of Italian composers for London, but he wrote three pasticci in which he re-used music from his own earlier works. They are the well known Oreste, the little-known Alessandro Severo and the completely unknown Giove in Argo. In the last-named opera he used, apart from music from his earlier works, some original compositions as well as two arias (sung by Iside) written by the Italian composer Francesco Araja.

The opera failed in London and was abandoned after only two performances.

== Performance history ==
For many years most of Giove in Argo was thought to have been lost until some old manuscripts were discovered containing a considerable number of the missing arias. However, most of the recitatives from the original work remain missing. This discovery enabled musicologist and composer John H. Roberts to assemble a performable opera out of the material that was supplemented partly with his own music composed in the style of Handel. A published edition of this score is due soon by the Complete Works Edition,.

This is an opera seria that does not have a castrato role, which was very rare at that time.

The first modern performance of Giove in Argo occurred on 15 September 2006 in Bayreuth in the 18th century Margravial Opera House in a complete and staged production by Concert Royal, Cologne and Collegium Cantorum Cologne, directed by Igor Folwill and conducted by Thomas Gebhardt. The United States premiere of the work took place on April 29, 2008, in a concert format presented at Carnegie Hall with conductor Robert Bass, the Orchestra of St. Luke's, and the Collegiate Chorale. Rufus Müller sang Giove and Elizabeth Futral portrayed Calisto. The first UK performance since 1739 took place at the Royal College of Music, London, as part of the Handel Festival, on 23 March 2015, conducted by Laurence Cummings.

== Roles ==
Roles, voice types, and premiere cast
Role	Voice type	Premiere cast, 1 May 1739
Aretes, a shepherd, later discovered as Jupiter	tenor	
Isis, daughter of Inachus, betrothed to the King of Egypt, Osiris	mezzo-soprano	Costanza Posterla
Erastus, a shepherd, later discovered as Osiris, King of Egypt	bass	Gustavus Waltz
Diana	soprano	Chiara Posterla
Calisto, daughter of Lycaon	soprano	
Lycaon, disguised as a shepherd, tyrant of Arcadia	bass	
Chorus of huntsmen, shepherds and nymphs

== Recordings ==
- Giove in Argo (Tanya Aspelmeier, Theresa Nelles, Lisa Tjalve, Markus Auerbach, Benoit Haller; Concert Royal Köln, Kammerchor Würzburg; conductor Thomas Gebhardt) CD 2007. Label: Musicaphon
- Giove in Argo (Ann Hallenberg, Karina Gauvin, Anicio Zorzi Giustiniani, Vito Priante, Theodora Baka, Johannes Weisser; Il Complesso Barocco; conductor Alan Curtis) CD 2013. Label: Virgin Classics.
