= MasterVoices =

Choir founded by Robert Shaw

- Choir
- Origin: New York City
- Founded: 1941
- Artistic Director: Ted Sperling
- Website: www.mastervoices.org

MasterVoices (formerly the Collegiate Chorale) is a symphonic choir based in New York City, USA. It was founded in 1941 by Robert Shaw, who was later to found the professional Robert Shaw Chorale. MasterVoices continues to give several performances annually in Carnegie Hall, New York City Center, Lincoln Center and other venues. The group performed at the opening of the United Nations and has sung and recorded with such conductors as Serge Koussevitzky, Arturo Toscanini and Leonard Bernstein. The organization's artistic director is Ted Sperling.

The group was originally named for its first home, Manhattan's Marble Collegiate Church, and was notable for Robert Shaw's insistence, from its inception, that the group be racially integrated. The choir and the church soon parted ways due to the church's concerns about the choir's ethnic and religious makeup. The chorale was led by Abraham Kaplan in the 1960s, and by conductor Richard Westenburg from 1973 to 1979, and by music director and conductor Robert Bass from 1979 until his death in 2008. Among the chorale's achievements during the Bass years were such performances at Carnegie Hall as the New York premiere of Richard Strauss's Friedenstag with the Orchestra of St. Luke's in 1997, the United States premiere of Dvořák's Dimitrij, the American premiere of Handel's Giove in Argo, Respighi's La fiamma and Puccini's Turandot with the new ending by Luciano Berio. Bass and the chorale also recorded and performed two of Beethoven's cantatas, Der Glorreiche Augenblick and Auf die Erhebung Leopold des Zwieten zur Kaiserwürde with sopranos Deborah Voigt and Elizabeth Futral. Notable singers who performed with the choir during these years, included Kathleen Battle, Stephanie Blythe, Vinson Cole, David Daniels, Lauren Flanigan, Maria Guleghina, Hei-Kyung Hong, Salvatore Licitra, Alessandra Marc and Bryn Terfel.

Roger Rees was the chorale's artistic associate from 2003 to 2015, and James Bagwell was music director from 2009 to 2015. In July 2007 the choir was invited to perform Brahms' Ein Deutsches Requiem at Switzerland's Verbier Festival.

The group changed its name to MasterVoices on August 3, 2015, the same year that Ted Sperling became its artistic director. He has directed their staged concerts of musicals and operettas such as Song of Norway, Knickerbocker Holiday, The Pirates of Penzance, My Fair Lady, Anyone Can Whistle, The Mikado and Iolanthe, and operas such as The Grapes of Wrath and Carmen. In 2021 MasterVoices received nominations for a Drama League Award and a New York Emmy Award for its digital concert production, Myths and Hymns.

== Partial discography ==
- A Salute to American Music (Richard Tucker Music Foundation Gala XVI, 1991)
