= Carmine Caruso =

American music educator

Carmine John Caruso
- Born: November 6, 1904; New York, New York, United States
- Died: May 26, 1987 (aged 82); New York, New York, United States
- Known for: educator, musician

Carmine Caruso (November 6, 1904, in New York, New York – April 21, 1987, in New York, New York), was a saxophonist and well-known brass instrument teacher, famous for his trumpet lessons in particular.

== Early life ==
Carmine John Caruso was born in New York in 1904 of Italian immigrant parents. By 1940, he and his wife Frances lived at 241 East 112th Street in East Harlem. This address was to become Caruso's home and office and the site of his early private lessons. The house was demolished in 1957 to make way for a housing project.

== Musical career ==
Caruso played violin as a child, then took up the saxophone, eventually becoming a working saxophonist. He was employed regularly in big bands until in 1941 he decided to begin teaching and playing as a freelance musician. In 1942, he took his first trumpet student, and by the next year he had 40 students.

For a woodwind player such as Caruso to become known almost exclusively for brass instrument instruction was atypical. This circumstance lead to some unusual situations, including that Caruso sometimes brought players with him to musical conventions to play brass exercises, which, though written by him, he could not play himself.

Caruso was known for helping brass players address their physical issues with producing sound rather than aesthetic musical instruction. Sometimes his teaching involved working with injured players. Noted trumpeter and music producer Herb Alpert was among these musicians.

Some musicians, including former students of Caruso, have warned musicians against undertaking Caruso's concepts by themselves, suggesting that musicians could physically harm themselves without proper supervision.

== Notable students ==
Among Caruso's prominent students were: Randy Brecker, Herb Alpert, John D’Earth, Dave Douglas, Jon Faddis, Art Farmer, Chuck Findley, Laurie Frink, Jerry Hyman, Roger Ingram, Julie Landsman, Dmitri Matheny, John McNeil, Jimmy Owens, Franck Pulcini, Enrico Rava, Marvin Stamm, Markus Stockhausen, and Peter Zummo.

Carmine Caruso died on April 21, 1987 in New York City.

== Published works ==
- Caruso on Breath Control: Dynamic Interval Exercises, 6 Note Publishing Company, 1971
- Caruso, the Long Setting Method for Beginners: Trumpet, with Hal Graham, 6 Note Publishing Company, 1971
- Musical Calisthenics for Brass, Almo Publications, 1979

== Legacy ==
The International Trumpet Guild launched the Carmine Caruso International Jazz Trumpet Solo Competition in 1993. The competition is held every two years, in October, at a different college or university. The competition was hosted in Europe for the first time in 2023, in Namur, Belgium. The 2025 competition is set to take place at University of North Texas.
