= Lyric Symphony =

Zemlinsky's work for soloists and large orchestra

The Lyric Symphony (German: Lyrische Symphonie), Op. 18, is a musical work for soprano and baritone soloists and large orchestra composed between 1922 and 1923 by Austrian composer Alexander Zemlinsky.

== Composition and performance history ==
The work was begun in April 1922. In a letter to his publishers of 19 September 1922, Zemlinsky described the work-in-progress as "...something along the lines of [Mahler's] Das Lied von der Erde". The orchestration was completed in August 1923. The sung texts are taken from The Gardener by Rabindranath Tagore in a German translation by Hans Effenberger.

The work received its premiere in Prague at the New German Theatre on June 4, 1924, under the composer's direction. The vocal solos were sung by Tilly de Garmo and Joseph Schwarz.

== Structure ==
The work is in seven connected movements, sung alternately by the two soloists:

- Ich bin friedlos, ich bin durstig nach fernen Dingen ("I am restless. I am athirst for far-away things")
- O Mutter, der junge Prinz ("O mother, the young Prince")
- Du bist die Abendwolke ("You are the evening cloud")
- Sprich zu mir Geliebter ("Speak to me, my love")
- Befrei mich von den Banden deiner Süße, Lieb ("Release me from the bonds of your sweetness, Love")
- Vollende denn das letzte Lied ("Then finish the last song")
- Friede, mein Herz ("Peace, my heart")

The performance duration is approximately 45 minutes.

Alban Berg quoted the third movement in his Lyric Suite for string quartet.

== Instrumentation ==
Woodwinds
4 flutes (3rd and 4th doubling piccolos)
3 oboes (3rd doubling cor anglais)
3 clarinets in A/B♭ (3rd doubling E♭ clarinet)
bass clarinet
3 bassoons (3rd doubling contrabassoon)

Brass
4 horns
3 trumpets in C
3 trombones
bass tuba

Percussion
timpani
bass drum
side drum
tam-tam
cymbals
tambourine
triangle
xylophone

Keyboards
harmonium
celesta

Voices
soprano solo
baritone solo

Strings
harp

1st violins
2nd violins
violas
cellos
double basses

== Discography ==
- Dorothy Dorow, Siegmund Nimsgern, BBC Symphony Orchestra, Gabriele Ferro - Fonit Cetra 1978
- Julia Varady, Dietrich Fischer-Dieskau, Berliner Philharmoniker, Lorin Maazel - Deutsche Grammophon 1982
- Karan Armstrong, Roland Hermann, ORF Vienna Radio Symphony Orchestra, Michael Gielen - Orfeo 2021 (live recording, 1989)
- Karan Armstrong, Ivan Kusnjer, Czech Philharmonic Orchestra, Bohumil Gregor - Supraphon 1990
- Alessandra Marc, Håkan Hagegård, Royal Concertgebouw Orchestra, Riccardo Chailly - Decca 1994
- Deborah Voigt, Bryn Terfel, Wiener Philharmoniker, Giuseppe Sinopoli - Deutsche Grammophon 1996
- Soile Isokoski, Bo Skovhus, Gürzenich-Orchester Kölner Philharmoniker, James Conlon - EMI Classics 2002
- Christine Schäfer, Matthias Goerne, Orchestre de Paris, Christoph Eschenbach - Capriccio 2006
