= Marina Rebeka =

Latvian soprano

- Born: 10 September 1980 (age 46); Riga, Latvia
- Occupation: Soprano singer
- Years active: 2007–present
- Awards: Order of the Three Stars
- Website: www.marinarebeka.com

Marina Rebeka (born 10 September 1980) is a Latvian soprano, active on both opera and concert stages. Associated with Violetta in Verdi's La traviata, she performs primarily in the 19th-century Italian and French repertoire, most notably works by Gioachino Rossini, in addition to Donna Anna in Mozart's Don Giovanni, another frequent role.

Educated in Latvia and Italy, she made her professional debut in 2007. After her international breakthrough in Rossini's Moïse et Pharaon at the Salzburg Festival in 2009, she has been performing leading roles with many opera companies, such as the Vienna State Opera, Metropolitan Opera, and Latvian National Opera.

Rebeka has been recording under her own label "Prima Classic" since 2018. She had previously recorded for Warner Classics and BK-Klassik.

== Early life and background ==
Rebeka was born in Riga, to Belarusian father and Siberian-born Latvian mother. The family name used to be Rebeko but was changed to Rebeka during the Soviet era; the name was first adopted by her paternal grandfather. Rebeka's maternal grandfather, Juris Jankovičs (1924–2019), was deported to Siberia with his family on 14 June 1941 and only returned more than twenty years later. He detailed his camp experience in two books: Skorpiona slazdā ('Scorpio trap', 2009) and Spīta krustceles ('Despite the crossroads', 2012), both published under the auspices of the Museum of the Occupation of Latvia.

She studied at the Grammar School of Nordic Languages. At the age of 13 she was inspired to become a singer after attending a performance of Bellini's Norma at the Dailes Theatre with her parents. Having no prior knowledge, she then began her initial musical studies at the music school "Rīdze" in the evening, concurrent to her Gymnasium studies. At the age of 17, after rejected by the Latvian Academy of Music, she entered the Jāzeps Mediņš Riga Music High School (Jāzepa Mediņa Rīgas mūzikas vidusskola), studying under Natālija Kozlova. She subsequently went to Italy, studying at the Conservatorio Arrigo Boito in Parma, during which she had her first stage experience playing Rosina in The Barber of Seville for a children audience, and then graduated at the Accademia Internazionale delle Arti in Rome (2006), and Conservatorio Santa Cecilia (2007). She had also attended Grace Bumbry's masterclass at the International Summer Academy at the Mozarteum University Salzburg.

== Career ==
Rebeka made her professional debut in 2007 at the Theater Erfurt as Violetta in La traviata, a role in which she would later sing at the Latvian National Opera, Vienna Volksoper and Finnish National Opera. Also in 2007, she participated Alberto Zedda's Accademia Rossiniana, portraying Folleville and Madama Cortese in Il viaggio a Reims at the Rossini Opera Festival, where she returned for Maometto II (2008), Stabat Mater (2010). Other engagements include Agilea in Teseo (Komische Oper Berlin), Britten's War Requiem (Liverpool Philharmonic), Tatyana in Eugene Onegin (Teatro Lirico di Cagliari), Brahms' Ein deutsches Requiem (Latvian National Symphony Orchestra). In 2009, she sang Adina in L'elisir d'amore in Riga, and made her La Scala debut in Il viaggio a Reims, before portraying Elettra in Mozart's Idomeneo at the Opéra national de Lorraine.

Her international breakthrough came when she made her Salzburg Festival debut in 2009 in Rossini's Moïse et Pharaon conducted by Riccardo Muti. She sang in War Requiem with the Royal Scottish National Orchestra, at the Usher Hall on 30 April 2010. In May and June, she performed Micaëla in Carmen in Baden-Baden (dir. Teodor Currentzis), and Valencia (dir. Zubin Mehta). In July 2010, she made her Royal Opera, London debut by replacing Angela Gheorghiu in La traviata; she only returned to replace Sonya Yoncheva in the same production in 2015. Later in the year, she sang her first Donna Anna in Don Giovanni in Deutsche Oper Berlin's new production, and was featured in a new staging of Moïse et Pharaon at the Teatro dell'Opera di Roma conducted by Muti.

Rebeka performed in Rossini's Stabat Mater with the NDR Sinfonieorchester in April 2011. In October 2011, she made her Metropolitan Opera debut in Michael Grandage's new production of Don Giovanni, and subsequently performed in another Moïse et Pharaon, presented by the American Symphony Orchestra and the Collegiate Chorale, conducted by James Bagwell at Carnegie Hall. The year 2012 saw her performances in Riga: two solo concerts on 15 January and 28 September, and role debut as Lucia in Lucia di Lammermoor. She returned to Berlin for Violetta, and then repeated the role in Florence. Later in the year, she made her Vienna State Opera debut with Donna Anna, and returned in consecutive seasons for Don Giovanni, La traviata, The Tales of Hoffmann (Antonia), and Roméo et Juliette (Juliette).

She sang in two William Tell premiere productions in 2013: Pierre Audi's at De Nederlandse Opera, and Graham Vick's at the Rossini Opera Festival, which was followed by her first Juliette (Verona Arena). She made her Lyric Opera of Chicago debut in La traviata, and returned for Robert Falls' new Don Giovanni, which opened the 2014/15 season. In May 2013, she made her Zürich Opera House debut in Donna Anna, returning in the 2013/14 season for Donna Anna, Leïla (Les pêcheurs de perles), and Fiordiligi (Così fan tutte), in the 2015/16 season for Violetta and Vitellia (La clemenza di Tito). In 2014, she performed in Maometto II in Rome, and a new William Tell production at the Bavarian State Opera, where she would sing Così fan tutte and Don Giovanni in the next two seasons. Later in the year, she returned to the Metropolitan Opera for Violetta and the following Musetta (La bohème).

In 2015, Rebeka sang Liù in a concert performance of Turandot in Riga, and Rossini's Stabat Mater at the Rheingau Musik Festival. She later joined the Radio Filharmonisch Orkest in concerts at the TivoliVredenburg and Concertgebouw. She returned to Latvia for a concert program on 14 November 2015 as part of the opening of the Great Amber Concert Hall. The year 2016 saw her debut in various roles: Mimì in La bohème (Mannheim National Theatre), title role in Norma (Teatro Lirico Giuseppe Verdi in Trieste), Ginevra in Ariodante (Lausanne Opera). In summer, she performed in Mozart's Idomeneo in Audi Sommerkonzerte, La traviata in NDR Klassik Open Air, and replaced Sonya Yoncheva in concert performances of Thaïs at the Salzburg Festival, debuting in the title role against Plácido Domingo. In October 2016, she returned to the Met for Pierre Audi's production of William Tell, and sang her first Donna Elvira (Don Giovanni) in the same season.

In 2017, she debuted in Maria Stuarda, first in three concert performances in Latvia, then a staged production in Rome. She was rejoined by Domingo in performances of La traviata, at the Palau de les Arts Reina Sofía, Plácido Domingo Classics in Pécs (festival dedicated to the singer), and Astana Opera.

In the 2017/18 season she was named the first-ever artist-in-residence by the Münchner Rundfunkorchester. They collaborated in three concerts: Luisa Miller in concert version, New Year's Eve Gala, and "Vive l'opera" concert.

== Marriage ==
Rebeka met Ukrainian tenor Dmytro Popov during L'elisir d'amore in Riga in 2009. They married in 2010 and their daughter, Katrīna, was born on 12 March 2011. Their marriage had ended by the time they performed jointly in La traviata in Vienna in May 2016.

Rebeka married Argentine sound engineer Edgardo Vertanessian in 2018, and together they founded their own record label, Prima Classic.

== Awards and honors ==
Rebeka has won prizes in the multiple competitions.

- 1st Prize at 4th Concorso Internazionale di Canto Lirico Premio Capriole in Franciacorta
- 1st Prize and Public Prize at 5th Concorso Lirico Internazionale Ottavio Ziino in Rome
- 3rd Prize at Viñas International Singing Contest in Barcelona
- 1st Prize at 20th Neue Stimmen of the Bertelsmann Stiftung in October 2007

In 2009, she was awarded the "Outstanding Artistic Achievements" award in the annual Latvijas Gāze Awards from the Latvian National Opera. She was appointed Commander of the Order of the Three Stars for her cultural achievements; the investiture was performed by president Raimonds Vējonis on 6 December 2016. In December 2017, she won a silver medal in Global Music Awards for her Rossini album "Amor fatale". In 2020, she was named "Artist of the Year" by the International Classical Music Awards.

== Recordings ==
Her first solo CD, "Mozart Arias" with Speranza Scappucci and the Royal Liverpool Philharmonic Orchestra, was released by EMI (Warner Classics) in November 2013. Her next album, "Amor fatale" – Rossini arias with Marco Armiliato and the Münchner Rundfunkorchester – was released in the summer of 2017 by BR-Klassik. Since 2018, she has been focusing her recording career on Prima Classic.

- 2013: Rossini: Petite messe solennelle, Antonio Pappano (conductor), Orchestra e Coro della Accademia Nazionale di Santa Cecilia (EMI)
- 2013: Mozart: Opera arias, Speranza Scappucci (conductor), Royal Liverpool Philharmonic Orchestra (Warner Music)
- 2015: Puccini: La bohème Live at the Met (The Metropolitan Opera New York)
- 2015: Rossini: Guillaume Tell, Michele Mariotti (conductor), Orchestra e Coro del Teatro Comunale di Bologna (DECCA, DVD)
- 2016: Featured in "Romance at the Met" (Met Opera on Demand)
- 2017: Rossini: Amor fatale, Marco Armiliato (conductor), Munich Radio Orchestra (BR-Klassik)
- 2018: Verdi: Luisa Miller (Live), Ivan Repušić (conductor), Munich Radio Orchestra (BR-Klassik)
- 2018: Mozart: La clemenza di Tito (Live), Yannick Nézet-Séguin (conductor), Chamber Orchestra of Europe, RIAS Kammerchor (Deutsche Grammophon)
- 2018: Spirito, Jader Bignamini (conductor), Orchestra & Chorus of the Teatro Massimo di Palermo (Prima Classic)
- 2019: Verdi: La traviata, Charles Castronovo, George Petean, Michael Balke (conductor), Latvian Festival Orchestra, State Choir Latvija (Prima Classic)
- 2020: Elle – French Opera Arias, Michael Balke (conductor), Sinfonieorchester St. Gallen (Prima Classic)
- 2021: Credo, Modestas Pitrėnas (conductor), Sinfonietta Rīga, Latvian Radio Choir (Prima Classic)

== Opera roles ==
- Violetta Valéry, La traviata (Verdi)
- Contessa di Folleville, Il viaggio a Reims (Rossini)
- Madama Cortese, Il viaggio a Reims (Rossini)
- Agilea, Teseo (Handel)
- Anna Erisso, Maometto II (Rossini)
- Tatiana, Eugene Onegin (Tchaikovsky)
- Adina, L'elisir d'amore (Donizetti)
- Elettra, Idomeneo (Mozart)
- Anai, Moïse et Pharaon (Rossini)
- Micaëla, Carmen (Bizet)
- Donna Anna, Don Giovanni (Mozart)
- Lucia, Lucia di Lammermoor (Donizetti)
- Mathilde, Guillaume Tell (Rossini)
- Juliette, Roméo et Juliette (Gounod)
- Leïla, Les pêcheurs de perles (Bizet)
- Fiordiligi, Così fan tutte (Mozart)
- Antonia, Les contes d'Hoffmann (Offenbach)
- Musetta, La bohème (Puccini)
- Liù, Turandot (Puccini)
- Mimì, La bohème (Puccini)
- Norma, Norma (Bellini)
- Ginevra, Ariodante (Handel)
- Vitellia, La clemenza di Tito (Mozart)
- Thaïs, Thaïs (Massenet)
- Maria Stuarda, Maria Stuarda (Donizetti)
- Donna Elvira, Don Giovanni (Mozart)
- Marguerite, Faust (Gounod)
- Luisa, Luisa Miller (Verdi)
- Amelia Grimaldi, Simon Boccanegra (Verdi)
- Giovanna, Giovanna d'Arco (Verdi)
- Anna Bolena, Anna Bolena (Donizetti)
- Nedda, Pagliacci (Leoncavallo)
- Desdemona, Otello (Verdi)

== Documentary ==
- Talanta un gribas svētītā (Blessed by Talent and Will). director: Zita Kaminska. aired on LTV1 on 7 September 2017.
