= Joseph Gregor =

Austrian writer and librettist (1888–1960)

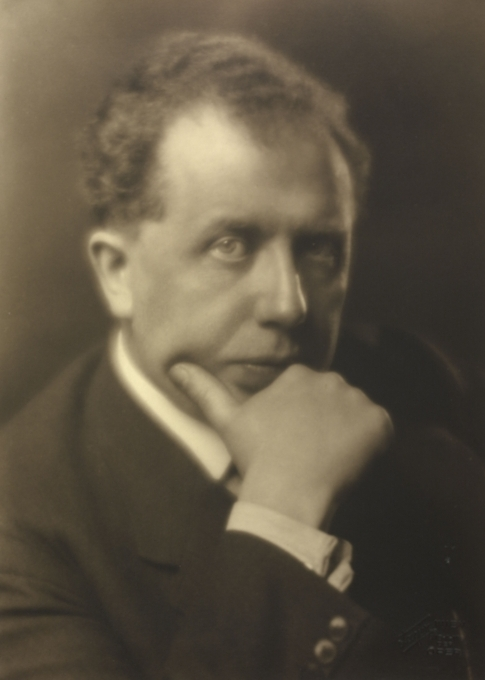
Joseph Gregor by Georg Fayer

Joseph Gregor (26 October 1888 – 12 October 1960) was an Austrian writer, theater historian and librettist. He served as director of the Austrian National Library.

== Life and career ==
Joseph Gregor was born in Czernowitz (now Chernivtsi, Ukraine). He studied musicology and philosophy at Vienna University, graduating in 1911. He worked under Max Reinhardt as assistant director and from 1912 to 1914 as a lecturer in music at the Franz-Josephs-University of Chernivtsi. He was employed at the Austrian National Library in Vienna in 1918. There he founded the Theater Collection in 1922, in which he included film after 1929. He also taught in 1932–1938 and 1943–1945 at the Max-Reinhardt-Seminar for actors, being granted the title "Professor" in 1933. Gregor wrote several illustrated pamphlets like the one published in 1930 and titled: Wiens letzte große Theaterzeit ("Vienna's Last Great Theater Epoch"). It was volume 12 in the series Denkmäler des Theaters ("Theater Monuments") which depicted famous set designs, theater artists, and costumes. He retired from his position at the National Library in 1953.

Gregor's role in the era of National Socialism has been disputed controversially: Gregor incorporated many libraries of politically persecuted intellectuals into the Austrian National Library. Some say he did so in order to save these libraries, others asserted that Gregor profited from the political persecution. A typical example is Gregor's acquisition of Stefan Zweig's autograph collection in 1937; Gregor corresponded frequently with Zweig. Oskar Pausch argues that Gregor was trying to protect Zweig's collection after the regime change in 1938, whereas others assess the librarian's role more critically.

Gregor died in Vienna on 12 October 1960. He was cremated at Feuerhalle Simmering, Vienna, where his ashes are located in the arcade court. His son Čestmír Gregor became a noted composer.

== Collaboration with Richard Strauss ==
A year after the seizure of power by the National Socialists in Germany, Jewish librettist Stefan Zweig fled to London, leaving Richard Strauss to look for a new librettist. Originally recommended by Zweig, Joseph Gregor wrote three librettos for Richard Strauss: Friedenstag (1938), Daphne (1938) and Die Liebe der Danae (1944), as well as contributing to the texts of Capriccio (1942) and the posthumous school opera Des Esels Schatten. Never completely convinced of Gregor's talent as a librettist, Strauss rejected his drafts for three other works: Celestina, Semiramis, and Aphrodite's Revenge.

Strauss was planning in 1940, at the suggestion of Heinz Drewes and Hans Joachim Moser, to collaborate with Gregor on a reworked libretto for the opera Jessonda. When Gregor offered to rewrite the text of the opera Die schweigsame Frau to replace Stefan Zweig's libretto, Strauss refused and also withdrew from the Jessonda project.

== Contributions to National Socialist propaganda ==
Gregor became one of the main theater scholars in the service of the Third Reich, even though Fascist authorities were reserved about him due to his editorial performance at the magazine Die Theater der Welt ("Theaters of the World") in 1936–1937; he had presented some Jews in a favorable manner. On the other hand, his non-fiction works and also the libretto to the Strauss opera Friedenstag were popular among ranking Nazis. Simply the fact that he published as much as he did in the period between 1940 and 1944 makes it clear that he enjoyed favor among high-ranking officials. His 1943 book on the Theater of the "Volk" of the "Ostmark" made ostentatious use of ideologically laden terms. In 1944 alone, six publications by Gregor appeared on the book and music market, which was otherwise severely restricted by paper shortages and fascist censors. His contributions to Third Reich propaganda remain ambiguous, however, because he was long considered to be Jewish. Gregor himself staunchly denied his semitic roots.

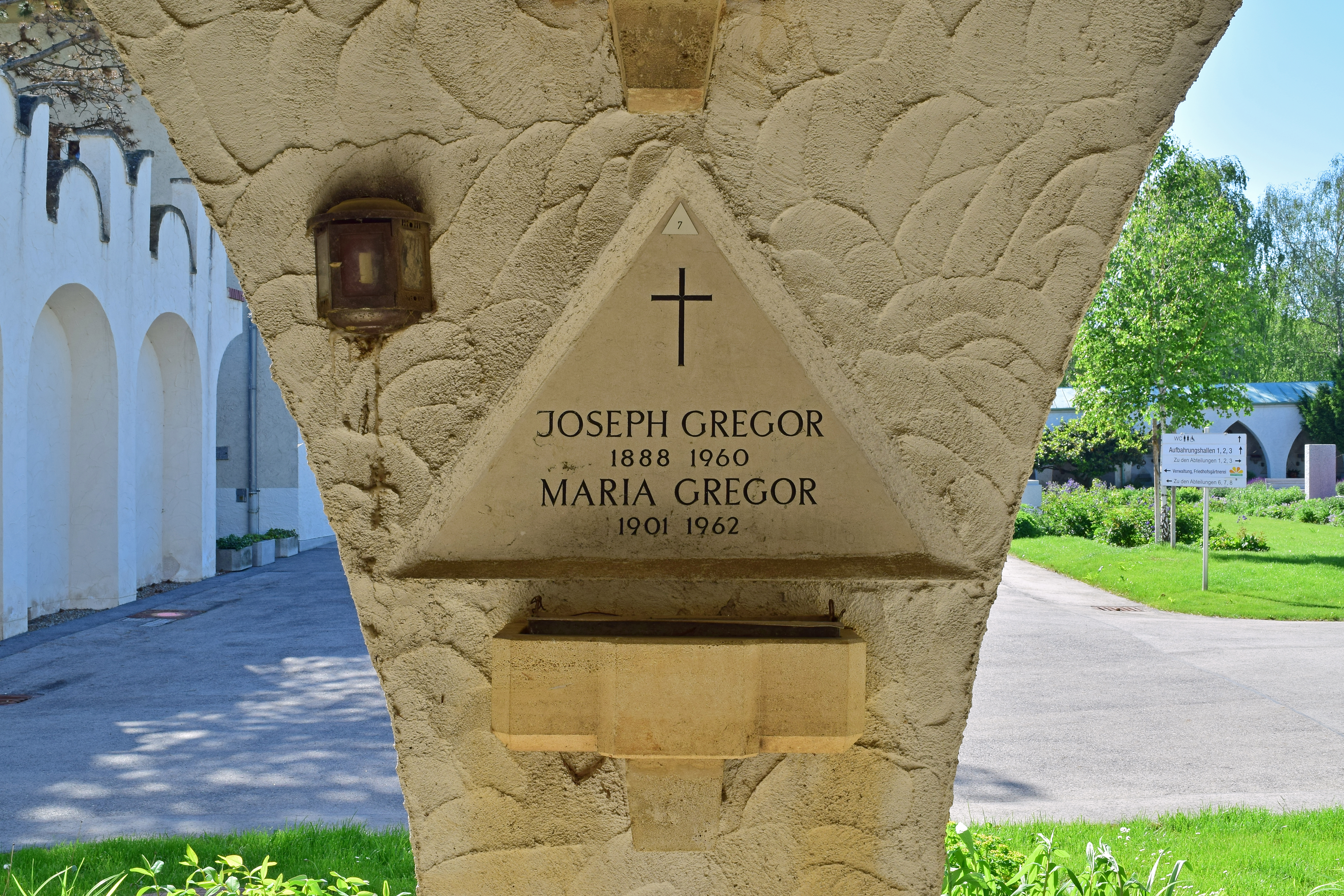
Feuerhalle Simmering, grave of Joseph Gregor

== Works (all in German) ==
Gregor was one of the leading theater scholars of his time. He wrote several standard works, including the periodical titled Schauspielführer with Margret Dietrich and Wolfgang Greisenegger, both of whom went on to prestigious careers as theater scholars at the University of Vienna. In addition, Gregor wrote biographies of Alexander the Great, William Shakespeare, and Richard Strauss.

=== Selection of non-fiction publications ===
- Das amerikanische Theater und Kino. Zwei kulturgeschichtliche Abhandlungen, Amalthea-Verlag, Leipzig, 1931 (together with René Fülöp-Miller)
- Weltgeschichte des Theaters, Phaidon Press, 1933 Zurich (a global history of the theater)
- Shakespeare, Phaidon Press, Vienna 1935
- Perikles: Griechenlands Größe und Tragik, Munich 1938 and ^{2}1944
- Richard Strauss, der Meister der Oper. Mit Briefen des Komponisten und 28 Bildern, Piper, Munich 1939 (on Strauss as an Opera composer, including a selection of letters and illustrations)
- Alexander der Grosse: Die Weltherrschaft einer Idee, Piper, Munich 1940 (in the sense of domination and the influence of "greats", Gregor describes Alexander the Great)
- Kulturgeschichte der Oper. Ihre Verbindung mit dem Leben, den Werken des Geistes und der Politik, Vienna 1941 and ^{2}1950 (a history of the opera)
- Das Theater des Volkes in der Ostmark. Vienna 1943 (expressly using the fascist name for Austria in the title, this work is devoted to the völkisch aspects of Austrian theater)
- Kulturgeschichte des Balletts: seine Gestaltung und Wirksamkeit in der Geschichte und unter den Künsten, Gallus Verlag, Vienna 1944 (a history of ballet)
- Weltgeschichte des Theaters 1: Von den Ursprüngen bis zum Ausgang des Barocktheaters, Piper, 1944 (a global history of theater from its origins until the baroque era)
- Die Akademie der bildenden Künste in Wien: ein Abriß ihrer Geschichte aus Anlaß des 250jährigen Bestehens (1692-1942), Vienna 1944 (a jubilee volume devoted to the Viennese Academy of Sciences)
- Geschichte des österreichischen Theaters von seinen Ursprüngen bis zum Ende der Ersten Republik, Donau-Verlag, Vienna, 1948 (a history of Austrian theater, this time without the term Ostmark)
- Der Schauspielführer: Lexikon der deutschsprachigen und internationalen Dramatik, founded in 1953 (a series of guidebooks to contemporary theaters, artists, and plays)

=== Libretti ===
- Friedenstag, Opera (together with Stefan Zweig in 1934/35). Music (1934–36): Richard Strauss. Premiere in Munich, 24 July 1938 (National Theatre)
- Daphne (1935/36) Bucolic Tragedy (Opera). Music (1936/37): Richard Strauss. Premiere 15 October 1938 in Dresden (Semper-Oper)
- Die Liebe der Danae (1936–40). Cheerful mythology (opera). Music (1938–40): Richard Strauss. Premiere 14 August 1952 in Salzburg (Grosses Festspielhaus)
- Capriccio (1935–39). Conversation piece for music (opera, together with Stefan Zweig, Richard Strauss, Clemens Krauss and Hans Swarovsky). Music (1939–42): Richard Strauss. Premiere in Munich, 28 October 1942 (National Theatre)
- An den Baum Daphne ("Beloved tree! From afar you wave ..."). Motet. Music (1943): Richard Strauss (TrV 272a, AV 137)
- Florian Geyer, Opera. Music: Hans Ebert (1889-1952)
