= Franck Pulcini =

French classical trumpeter

Franck Pulcini is a French classical trumpeter.

== Life ==
Born in Limoges, Pulcini started studying music at the Limoges Conservatory in Gérard Dubarry's class, where he won a gold medal and a city award. For several years, he went to perfect his skills with many trumpeters who were references such as Marcel Lagorce, Bernard Jeannoutot, Bo Nilsson, Roger Delmotte, Carmine Caruso and Antoine Curé.

In 1983, he entered the Conservatoire de Paris in Pierre Thibaud's class. He perfected his skills for 3 years before obtaining a first prize unanimously in 1986.

He will then play with the most prestigious orchestras both nationally and internationally such as the Orchestre philharmonique de Radio France, the Orchestre national de France, the Ensemble intercontemporain, the Orchestre de l'Opéra national de Paris, the Orchestre National Bordeaux Aquitaine, the Orchestre national du Capitole de Toulouse etc. He will thus have the opportunity to play under the direction of Pierre Boulez, Lorin Maazel, Emmanuel Krivine, Georges Prêtre, Carlo Maria Giulini, Michael Gielen, Sylvain Cambreling, Marek Janowski, and Seiji Ozawa.

In 1994, he won first prize in the Tokyo International Competition. He is also a laureate of several international trumpet competitions as a soloist: the Prague International Music Competition, the International Trumpet Guild of Tallahassee in Florida.

In 1995, he was appointed principal trumpet of the Southwest German Radio Symphony Orchestra of Baden-Baden and Fribourg-en-Brisgau.

As for chamber music, he founded the Epsilon brass ensemble with Jean-Pierre Cénédèse, Bruno Flahou and Thierry Thibault. This brass quartet is the winner of the International Narbonne Competition and the Osaka Chamber Music Competition in Japan. In addition to performing numerous concerts, the Epsilon ensemble participates in numerous musical workshops around the world.

Pulcini is the artistic director, with his three accomplices of Epsilon, of the "Cuivres en Fête" festival (formerly named Epsival) in Limoges, which mingles both concert and master classes every year in August.

He regularly performs on tours throughout the world, whether in chamber music with the Epsilon Ensemble, in recital or as a soloist accompanied by the world's leading orchestras.
