= Julie Landsman =

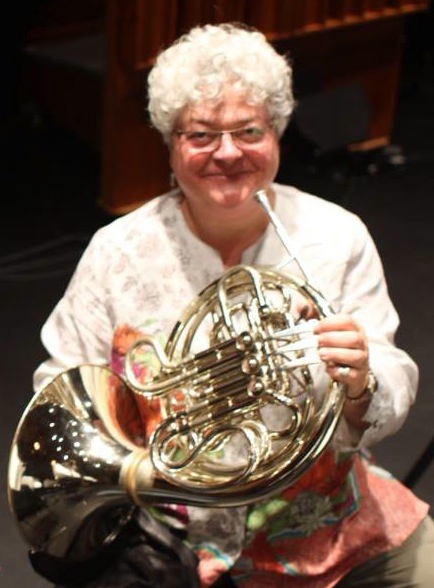

Background information
- Born: April 3, 1953 (age 73); New York City, New York
- Instrument: French horn

Julie Landsman (born April 3, 1953) is an American-born French horn player and teacher. Landsman was principal horn of the Metropolitan Opera from 1985 to 2010. Prior to her appointment with the Metropolitan Opera Orchestra, Landsman served as co-principal horn with the Houston Symphony, and has toured internationally with the New York Philharmonic and Orpheus Chamber Orchestra. Julie Landsman is on the faculties of The Juilliard School, the USC Thornton School of Music, and the Music Academy of the West. She formerly taught at the Bard College Conservatory of Music.

Her students hold prominent positions in orchestras throughout the world. A graduate of Juilliard, her teachers have included James Chambers, Howard Howard and Carmine Caruso. Landsman is featured horn soloist on the recording of Wagner's Ring Cycle with the Metropolitan Opera conducted by James Levine, and has appeared on numerous other recordings. Music festival appearances have included the Marlboro Music Festival, Sarasota Music Festival, Chamber Music Northwest, Santa Fe Chamber Music Festival, Aspen Music Festival and School, Mainly Mozart Orchestra, and La Jolla SummerFest. Landsman grew up in Brooklyn.
