= Speranza Scappucci =

Italian conductor and pianist

- Born: April 9, 1973 (age 53); Rome, Italy
- Education: Conservatorio di Musica Santa Cecilia; Juilliard School of Music
- Occupations: Conductor and pianist

Speranza Scappucci (born 9 April 1973) is an Italian conductor and pianist.

== Biography ==
One of four children in her family, Scappucci's father is a retired Vatican Radio journalist, and her mother is a retired English teacher from the Liceo ginnasio statale Terenzio Mamiani. Scappucci began to learn the piano at age 5. She entered the Conservatorio di Musica Santa Cecilia in Rome at age 10, concentrating on piano and chamber music. She graduated with a diploma from the conservatory in 1993. She continued her music studies in the US at the Juilliard School of Music, in Juilliard's Accompanying Program. At Juilliard, fellow students asked her for assistance in Italian pronunciation, which directed her interest toward opera coaching. From Juilliard, she earned a certificate in piano in 1995, and a Master of Music (M.M.) degree in performance in 1997.

== Career ==
Scappucci worked as a répétiteur and rehearsal pianist for such opera companies as New York City Opera, Lyric Opera of Chicago and Santa Fe Opera, the Music Academy of the West, Glyndebourne Festival Opera (six summer seasons), the Metropolitan Opera, and the Vienna State Opera. She also was an assistant to Riccardo Muti over the course of 8 years at the Salzburg Festival, including work as a harpsichord player, in addition to coaching singers and rehearsing choruses from the piano. Scappucci counts Muti as one of her principal influences and mentors. Her career transitioned into conducting over the course of her work as a répétiteur, without formal academic instruction in conducting.

In 2012, Scappucci made her public opera conducting debut with Yale Opera at the Yale School of Music, with Così fan tutte, her first ever public engagement as an opera conductor, and the first female conductor ever to conduct a Yale Opera production. She returned to Juilliard for her New York City debut as an opera conductor in November 2014. Her conducting debut with Santa Fe Opera was in July 2015.

Outside of the USA, Scappucci made her UK debut as an opera conductor with Scottish Opera in October 2013. At the Vienna State Opera, Scappucci was the fourth-ever female conductor, and the first female Italian conductor, to conduct a production at the Vienna State Opera, for her house debut as conductor in November 2016. In February 2017, she was the first female conductor to direct the orchestra in the annual Vienna Opera Ball, as an emergency substitute for an indisposed Semyon Bychkov.

In March 2017, Scappucci made her first appearance with the Opéra Royal de Wallonie. Based on her work in this production, in April 2017, the Opéra Royal de Wallonie named her its new principal conductor and music director, effective with the 2017-2018 season. This appointment marks her first principal conductorship, and she is the first female conductor to hold this post. Scappucci concluded her music directorship of the Opéra Royal de Wallonie at the close of the 2021-2022 season.

On 18 January 2022, Scappucci conducted the first night of the new La Scala production of Bellini's I Capuleti e i Montecchi, the first female Italian conductor ever to conduct a production at La Scala. In the UK, Scappucci first guest-conducted at the Royal Opera House (ROH), Covent Garden in 2022. In June 2023, the ROH announced the appointment of Scappucci as its next principal guest conductor, effective with the 2025-2026 season, the first conductor to hold the post since 1997 and the first female conductor to be named to the post.

Scappucci made her first commercial recording for Warner Classics, of Mozart arias with soprano Marina Rebeka.

Cultural offices
Preceded by Paolo Arrivabeni	Music Director, Opéra Royal de Wallonie; 2017–2022	Succeeded by Giampaolo Bisanti
