= George Tsontakis =

American composer and conductor (born 1951)

- Born: October 24, 1951 (age 74); Astoria, Queens, New York City
- Occupations: Composer, conductor

George Tsontakis (born Astoria, Queens, New York City, October 24, 1951) is an American composer and conductor.

== Early life and education ==
Tsontakis was born in New York City, and is of Greek descent. He studied composition with Hugo Weisgall and Roger Sessions at the Juilliard School from 1974 to 1978, and later with Franco Donatoni at the Accademia Nazionale di Santa Cecilia in Rome.

== Career ==
His music has been performed and broadcast by major orchestras, chamber ensembles, and festivals throughout North and South America, Europe, and Japan.

Tsontakis was honored with the "Academy Award" in 1995 from the American Academy of Arts and Letters and was the fourth recipient of the Ives Living Fellowship, in 2007. Pianist Stephen Hough's recording of Tsontakis's "Ghost Variations" on Hyperion Records was nominated for a Grammy Award for Best Contemporary Classical Composition, and was the only classical recording among Time magazine's 1998 Top Ten Recordings. Tsontakis received the Berlin Prize from the American Academy in Berlin in 2002, and the University of Louisville Grawemeyer Award for Music Composition for his Violin Concerto No. 2 in 2005.

A proficient conductor of orchestral and choral music, Tsontakis has been a composer-in-residence with the Aspen Music Festival and conductor and the founding director of the Aspen Contemporary Ensemble at the Aspen Music School, where he teaches composition. He was an assistant professor at the Brooklyn College Conservatory of Music, and has served on the faculty of Sarah Lawrence College. He is Distinguished Faculty, Composer-in-Residence of the Bard College Conservatory of Music in Annandale-on-Hudson, New York. He was a Weil fellow at Auburn University Montgomery.

Tsontakis's music has been recorded by Hyperion, Koch, Innova, and Naxos.

In 2008, his Violin Concerto No. 2, recorded by violinist Steven Copes and the SPCO, was nominated for a Grammy in the category of Best Classical Contemporary Composition, but lost to John Corigliano's Mr. Tambourine Man: Seven Poems of Bob Dylan. He is Distinguished Composer-in-Residence at the Bard College Conservatory.
