= Deborah Voigt =

American operatic soprano

Deborah Joy Voigt (born August 4, 1960) is an American dramatic soprano who has sung roles in operas by Wagner and Richard Strauss.

== Biography and career ==
=== Early life and education ===
Deborah Joy Voigt was born into a religious Southern Baptist family in 1960 and raised in Wheeling, Illinois, just outside Chicago. At age five, she joined the choir at a Baptist church and began learning the piano. Her mother sang and played piano at church while her two younger brothers sang in rock music bands. Those early experiences in church inspired her interest in music. When she was 14, her family moved to Placentia in Orange County, California. It was traumatic for Voigt, then in her teens, to adjust to Southern California, "land of endless sunshine and impossibly perfect bodies."

She attended El Dorado High School, where she was a member of El Dorado's Vocal Music and Theater programs, starring in musicals including Fiddler on the Roof, The Music Man and Mame. At that time, Voigt recalled in an interview, she did not seriously consider becoming an opera singer and was unaware of the existence of the Metropolitan Opera. Upon graduation in 1978, she won a vocal scholarship funded by the Crystal Cathedral in Garden Grove, California, so that she could enroll in the voice program at California State University, Fullerton, where she met the voice teacher Jane Paul Hummel, under whom she trained for about eight years. Voigt was the finalist of the Met National Council Auditions for Young Singers in 1985. She won awards at many prestigious singing competitions and made her Carnegie Hall debut in 1988. Named an Adler Fellow, she apprenticed at San Francisco Opera's Merola Program for two years, studying seven major roles. There, she also took a class from Leontyne Price.

=== 1990s to mid-2000s ===
Voigt slowly established her career, entering the professional opera world after winning several first prizes at competitions. Her breakthrough role was Ariadne in Richard Strauss's Ariadne auf Naxos at Boston Lyric Opera in January 1991. The performance was praised by noted arts critic John Rockwell in The New York Times, who called Voigt "one truly remarkable singer" and predicted that she would soon become an important Wagnerian soprano comparable to American soprano Eileen Farrell. Ariadne first brought her to public notice and international success and remains one of her greatest achievements. Later she often refers to her operatic career jokingly as Ariadne Inc.

When Voigt made her debut at the Metropolitan Opera on October 17, 1991, in the lead role of Amelia in Verdi's Un ballo in maschera, critic Allan Kozinn wrote that she had come with a big reputation. He noted that "Voigt's deep, mezzolike darkness brought impressive range of color to Amelia's music". He also commented on how well she conveyed Amelia's feeling of urgency and despair in the second act soliloquy, sung with a warm and golden tone. Kozinn criticized her acting for not matching her singing, but emphasized that she lost no clarity or smoothness in her big voice. In March 1992, Voigt returned to the Met to sing as Chrysothemis in Strauss's Elektra.

In the same month, she won the coveted Richard Tucker Award from the Richard Tucker Music Foundation. The prize was to participate in the annual gala of the foundation held on November 22, 1992, at Avery Fisher Hall. Critic Bernard Holland noted that her "Ozean, du Ungeheuer", a long sequence from Weber's Oberon, brightened the mood and elevated the gala. He complimented her performance as "the Tucker gala's most satisfying". Two months later Holland, reviewing her substitution for Aprile Millo at the Met, said that her attractive singing in the opening sequence as Leonora in Verdi's Il trovatore "reached out and settled comfortably in every corner of this big hall", but said she did not fully immerse herself in the passion of the heroine.

In May 2003, Voigt sang and recorded (for DG) the role of Isolde at the Vienna State Opera. Since then she has regularly appeared at the Met and other major opera houses, such as the San Francisco Opera, Lyric Opera of Chicago, Deutsche Oper Berlin and the Opéra Bastille.

=== 2004: The "little black dress" ===
In 2004, Voigt was removed from the role of Ariadne at the Royal Opera House when she could not fit into one of the costumes, a "little black dress." The casting director, Peter Mario Katona, wanted her to wear it instead of the typical period costume used in such operas, letting out the dress with tailoring, or replacing it with another costume. She was replaced by Anne Schwanewilms, a German singer of slimmer appearance. She was "very angry" about the incident, but kept silent about it for several months. When the decision became public, the Royal Opera House received substantial criticism. It was pointed out that many notable sopranos, such as the Italian Luisa Tetrazzini, American Jessye Norman and English Jane Eaglen, had been "large-boned, zaftig, even enormous", and Voigt had merely "followed in their heavy footsteps."

The decision was also criticized because of the popular stereotype that female opera singers have to be heavy in order to sing well. There is the old expression that "in opera, great voices often come in large packages" and the well-worn saying "It ain't over till the fat lady sings". Voigt was headlined in the British tabloid press as "The show ain't over till the fat lady slims." There was also an outcry because, it seemed at the time that high culture performing arts, such as opera, should not emulate low culture Hollywood images of thin female stars.

It has been suggested that the incident may have helped Voigt in the long run. She had tried many diets, such as Jenny Craig and Weight Watchers, unsuccessfully over the years. Maestro Georg Solti, "who never minced words", had once expressed concern about her weight. She underwent three-hour gastric bypass surgery in June 2004, which she has discussed publicly. It is highly risky for any person, but especially for a singer, who depends on a strong thoracic diaphragm "to support the column of sound". The operation, performed at Lenox Hill Hospital in New York City, was successful. She lost over 100 pounds (7 stone), and went from a size 30 to size 14; but has kept her exact weight, both before and after the operation, private.

Voigt has said she had the surgery not only because of the Royal Opera House but also because of her concern about health problems caused by the weight. In other interviews with The New York Times in 2005 and 2008, she said the fees the Royal Opera House owed her paid in part for the surgery. Her concern was that the firing was done so cruelly. In several interviews, she expressed relief and delight in the weight loss.

Since her dramatic weight loss, Voigt was rehired by the Royal Opera House for the role she was fired from. The public reaction was positive. Voigt said in 2005 that she felt "good will from fans and the public." She said in 2008 that she had "assumed" the "rapprochement" would not happen until they had new management.

=== 2006 to 2008 ===
In April 2006, she performed her first Tosca at the Vienna State Opera and the Metropolitan Opera; her first fully staged Salome at Lyric Opera of Chicago premiered in October of the same year. She performed Ariadne in Richard Strauss's Ariadne auf Naxos for the theatre during the 2007/08 season, to rave reviews.

In January 2006, she sang Broadway tunes and other popular songs at UCLA's Royce Hall. She performed a similar concert from "the American songbook" in January 2008 at Lincoln Center. This included tributes to Broadway sopranos Barbara Cook and Julie Andrews.

Although Voigt's Fach is that of the dramatischer soprano, she made the transition into singing the hochdramatische soprano repertoire with her interpretation of Isolde from Wagner's Tristan und Isolde. She sang the role in the 2007/08 season at the Metropolitan Opera and in the 2008/09 season at the Lyric Opera of Chicago. During one of the performances at the Met, Voigt took ill and had to leave the stage. She returned at the next performance of Tristan und Isolde and finished the run to acclaim by most reviewers, including The New York Times, though some critics, including The New York Sun, panned her performance.

On September 28, 2008, Voigt joined American soprano Patricia Racette and American mezzo-soprano Susan Graham in singing a comedic tribute to Spanish tenor Plácido Domingo. The three

dressed in tuxedos and—once these had been ripped off to a flash of lightning—matching gowns, who performed a humorous medley of favorite soprano showpieces. The opening trio, "Three Little Maids from School Are We" from The Mikado, drew waves of laughter from the audience, as did excerpts from La bohème, The Merry Widow (sung in Spanish), and Die Walküre. The medley ended with a rousing rendition of The Three Tenors' signature aria, "Nessun dorma" from Turandot.

=== 2009 to 2010 ===
In May 2009, Voigt began mentoring a younger soprano, Christina Borgioli, in a new program that she has set up. Borgioli has "been selected as the first participant in the Deborah Voigt/Vero Beach Opera Foundation's Protegee Mentoring Program." This will involve both voice and acting training, and a shadowing experience.

Voigt sang Strauss at the Aspen Music Festival's 60th anniversary concert on August 6, 2009, with David Zinman conducting. Her next formal opera engagement was in the title role of Tosca in September and October 2009at the Lyric Opera in Chicago. Christina Borgioli, her mentee, accompanied Voigt in this production.

In February and March 2010, she sang Ariadne in Ariadne auf Naxos at the Zürich Opera House.

Voigt sang again with the Metropolitan Opera during the 2009/10 Season. She sang Chrysothemis in Richard Strauss's Elektra in December 2009, and Senta in The Flying Dutchman in April 2010, an "iconic Wagnerian role...for the first time on the Met stage." The New York Times wrote that she "brought steely power and lyrical elegance to her first Met Senta".

==== Alceste ====
In May 2009, Voigt starred in the rarely heard 1776 opera Alceste by Christoph Willibald Gluck, in concert at Lincoln Center's Rose Theatre. She performed with the Collegiate Chorale and American tenor Vinson Cole, as King Admète, and the New York City Opera Orchestra." According to a New York Times preview, "The chance to hear Deborah Voigt in her first performance of the title role in Gluck's Alceste is clearly driving the ticket sales for the Collegiate Chorale's concert performance of this remarkable opera". Time Out wrote that Voigt "already proved her affinity for similar material a few years back when she sang Cassandre in Berlioz's Les Troyens at the Met." The France-Amérique noted that Voigt and the chorus received French diction training for the performance from Thomas Grubb, a teacher at the Juilliard School.

Unfortunately, Voigt caught the flu when she was to perform, yet went on with the show; the photograph caption for the New York Times review was, "Deborah Voigt, even with the flu, led a Collegiate Chorale concert performance on Tuesday." The reviewer wrote, "she did some impressive work, singing with power, gleaming sound and sensitive phrasing, though she clearly struggled. Often her voice sounded congested and her top range tight...her voice nearly gave out, and she had to drop down an octave to get through a phrase." The review reserved judgment but noted that some fans were "disappointed." Another reviewer wrote, "One would like very much to hear Voigt undertake this dramatic role again when she is in peak form."

=== 2010 to 2012 ===
In December 2010, Voigt returned to the Met as Minnie in the 100th anniversary production of the world premiere of Puccini's La fanciulla del West. She reprised this rôle at the Lyric Opera of Chicago in January 2011 and at the Opéra Royal de Wallonie in Liège in February 2013.

In April 2011, Voigt sang her first Brünnhilde at the Metropolitan Opera in Canadian stage director Robert Lepage's new production of Die Walküre, the second installment of the Met's highly publicized new production of Wagner's Ring Cycle directed by Lepage. She sang the role again as the cycle was presented in its entirety during the 2011-12 season, adding to her repertoire the final two operas of the cycle, Siegfried and Götterdämmerung. She also appeared in a 2012 documentary film, Wagner's Dream, about the production.

In the summer of 2011, she sang the lead of Annie Oakley in the Irving Berlin musical Annie Get Your Gun at the Glimmerglass Festival. For that festival, Terrence McNally, Francesca Zambello, and Voigt collaborated to produce the stage show Voigt Lessons. Voigt revived the show in 2015 at the Art House in Provincetown, Massachusetts.

=== 2013 to 2015 ===
In September 2013, Voigt dropped out of a production of Tristan und Isolde and removed Isolde from her repertoire due to having found "the long, punishing role beyond her current vocal capacities". Her stage performances have dwindled since. Voigt's last performance at the Metropolitan Opera was as Marie in Alban Berg's Wozzeck on March 22, 2014

In 2015, HarperCollins published her autobiography, Call Me Debbie: True Confessions of a Down-to-Earth Diva co-written with former People Magazine writer, Natasha Stoynoff.

== Personal life ==
As of March 2009, Voigt had been living in New York for about five years. Voigt married her high school sweetheart, John Leitch, in 1988, divorcing him seven years later. She said she relied on him and he worked for her career. As she was getting more famous, she traveled around the world with him, but her crowded schedule and the accompanying stress eventually led to their divorce.

== Awards ==
Voigt has received various awards since her debut as a singer. She won Philadelphia's Luciano Pavarotti Vocal Competition in 1988, the Verdi Competition in 1989, and the gold prize for best female singer at the 1990 International Tchaikovsky Competition.

In March 1992, she won the Richard Tucker Award, the top award presented by the Richard Tucker Music Foundation, including a $30,000 cash award.

Voigt has been nominated for a Grammy Award several times and shared the 1996 "Best Opera Recording" award for the recording of Berlioz's Les Troyens directed by Charles Dutoit with Montreal Symphony Orchestra. She was also co-nominated in 2002 for "Best Choral Performance" on a Columbia Records recording. In 2013, she shared the "Best Opera Recording" award for the Metropolitan Opera's recording of Richard Wagner's Der Ring des Nibelungen.

Voigt garnered Musical America's Vocalist of the Year in 2003, and an Opera News award for distinguished achievement in 2007. She was honored as a Chevalier of Ordre des Arts et des Lettres at the Opéra Bastille on 27 March 2002.

She was inducted into the Placentia-Yorba Linda Unified School District Hall of Fame in 1997.

== Recordings ==
Voigt has made a number of recordings, including two solo compact discs. She is on the live recording of the Vienna State Opera's 2003 production of Wagner's Tristan und Isolde for Deutsche Grammophon. In a 2001 interview with Associated Press, she said she had been unlucky with recording because of unexpected cancellations and postponements. The opportunities to cooperate with high-profile musicians could have made her a major prima donna more quickly. She had a chance to work with Luciano Pavarotti in a televised production of Verdi's La forza del destino in 1997, but the performance did not take place since Pavarotti had not learned the role of Alvaro and another opera was substituted. Later the same year, Voigt was to sing on a new recording of Tristan und Isolde under the direction of Sir Georg Solti. Before it proceeded, Solti suddenly died of a heart attack.

In April 2001, The Metropolitan Opera intended to broadcast a taping of Strauss's Ariadne auf Naxos in which Voigt sang the title role, but it was put off until 2003 for co-star Natalie Dessay. Voigt felt frustrated that every recording plan for Ariadne had been delayed or stopped for five years until late 2001. Finally, she sang Ariadne in a 2001 recording released by Deutsche Grammophon in which Dessay, Anne Sofie von Otter and Ben Heppner co-starred, and Giuseppe Sinopoli conducted. Voigt said that if he had not participated in the project, she doubts she could have ever recorded Ariadne. The album was mentioned as one of the "Top Classical Recordings of 2001" according to the New York Times.

== Selected discography ==
- Berlioz. Les Troyens, conducted by Charles Dutoit with Montreal Symphony Orchestra and Chorus, Decca, 1993
- Rossini, The Rossini Bicentennial Birthday Gala, conducted by Roger Norrington with the Orchestra of St. Luke's, EMI Records 0777-7-54643-2-0, 1994
- Beethoven: Fidelio, conducted by Colin Davis with Bavarian State Opera Chorus & Radio Symphony, BMG, 1996
- Schoenberg: Gurre-Lieder, Teldec, 1996
- Beethoven: Cantates, Koch International Classics, 1997
- Mahler: Symphony No. 8, Telarc, 1997
- Robert Shaw: Absolute Heaven, Telarc, 1997
- Richard Strauss: Elektra, Deutsche Grammophon, 1997
- The American Opera Singer, BMG/RCA Victor, 1997
- Operatically Incorrect!, BMG/RCA Victor, 1997
- Wagner: Der fliegende Holländer, Sony/Columbia, 1997
- Richard Strauss: Friedenstag, Deutsche Grammophon, 1999
- Zemlinsky: Sämtliche Chorwerke, EMI Classics, 1999
- Richard Strauss: Ariadne auf Naxos, UNI/Deutsche Grammophon, 2000
- Wagner: Love Duets, EMI Classics, 2000
- Zemlinsky: Cymbeline Suite, EMI Classics, 2001
- Obsessions, EMI Classics, 2004
- James Levine's 25th Anniversary Metropolitan Opera Gala, Deutsche Grammophon DVD B0004602-09, 2005
- All My Heart, EMI Classics, 2005
- Let The Season In, Mormon Tabernacle Choir, 2014
