= Bard College Conservatory of Music =

Music conservatory in New York, U.S.

Coordinates: 42°1′10″N 73°54′27.5″W

The Bard College Conservatory of Music is part of Bard College in Annandale-on-Hudson, New York. Founded in 2005, the program is unique among music conservatories in the United States in that all undergraduate students are required to participate in a five-year dual-degree program, in which both a B.M. in music and a B.A. in a subject other than music are obtained. Many of the Conservatory's faculty also teach at other conservatories such as the Juilliard School and the Curtis Institute.

Undergraduate faculty teach the standard orchestral/chamber music instruments and composition. The Conservatory also offers two graduate programs: the Graduate Vocal Arts Program and the Graduate Conducting Program, and a Post-graduate Collaborative Piano Fellowship in addition to a Preparatory Division.

== Facilities ==
The László Z. Bitó Conservatory Building

The construction of the László Z. Bitó Conservatory Building began in October 2011 and was completed in January 2012. Made possible by a $9.2 million gift from Bard alumnus László Z. Bitó, class of 1960, this teaching and performance facility was designed by Deborah Berke & Partners Architects.

== Conservatory Programs ==
The Bard College Conservatory of Music offers a five-year undergraduate program in which each student pursues two degrees concurrently: a Bachelor of Music degree and a Bachelor of Arts degree in a field other than music. At the graduate level, the Conservatory offers two two-year programs in conducting and voice leading to a Master of Music. In addition, the conservatory offers a certificate-granting Advanced Performance Studies Program for instrumentalists who have already received a Bachelor's degree.

=== The Undergraduate Double Degree Program ===
All Conservatory undergraduates pursue a five-year program leading to two degrees: the bachelor of music and the bachelor of arts in a field other than music. The pursuit of these two degrees at Bard is thoroughly integrated. Conservatory students live, eat, and attend most classes with non-Conservatory students, and are fully part of the academic and social life of the College. Each Conservatory student has two academic advisers, one from the Conservatory and one from a field that the student is considering as a major for the B.A. degree. In the bachelor of music program all performance majors study composition, and the Conservatory Seminar integrates music theory and music history with special emphasis on their relation to performance.

=== The Graduate Vocal Arts Program ===
The vocal arts curriculum is divided into three main components: Core Seminars, private instruction, and workshops.

The program's curriculum centers on the Core Seminar, which meets for three hours each week. Each semester the seminar focuses on a topic that addresses different aspects of the singing life: poetry and text, international musical influences, building and sustaining a musical career, and opera.

- Core Seminar I: Dickinson, Goethe, and Verlaine
- Core Seminar II: First Songs
- Core Seminar III: Creating Unique Performance Opportunities
- Core Seminar IV: The Singer and the Stage

Private instruction includes voice lessons, vocal coachings, and Alexander Technique. In addition to the Core Seminars and private instruction, students participate in Acting Explorations, Diction and Phonetics, Language Translation for Singers, Movement Improvisation, Opera, Professional Development, Recital Class, Singer's Form, Vocal Chamber Music, and Vocal Ensembles Workshops.

=== The Graduate Conducting Program ===
Co-directed by Leon Botstein, James Bagwell, The Graduate Conducting Program of The Bard College Conservatory of Music is two-year graduate curriculum that culminates in the Master of Music (M.M.) degree. The Graduate Conducting Program offers both choral and orchestral conducting tracks.

=== The Post-Graduate Collaborative Piano Fellowship ===
The Postgraduate Collaborative Piano Fellowship is a two-year fellowship designed to give professional experience to pianists who have a strong interest in becoming collaborative artists, with the ultimate aim of easing the transition between school and the working world of a collaborative pianist. The fellowship is open to both students who have already completed a degree in collaborative piano and those students who have completed a bachelor's degree in piano performance and have a strong interest in further study in collaborative piano.

=== Advanced Performance Studies Program ===
The Advanced Performance Studies Program is a nondegree-granting, four semester program for exceptionally gifted performers who wish to continue their study of music through concentrated study. Applicants must have completed at least the bachelor of music degree or its equivalent and must demonstrate a high level of ability and potential through the admission process.

== Notable faculty ==
Tan Dun (Dean of the Conservatory)

- Piano
  - Jeremy Denk (master classes)
  - Richard Goode (master classes)
  - Peter Serkin
  - Benjamin Hochman
- Violin
  - Shmuel Ashkenasi
  - Gil Shaham
  - Yiwen Jiang
  - Ani Kavafian (master classes)
  - Weigang Li
  - Daniel Phillips
  - Todd Phillips
  - Arnold Steinhardt (master classes)
- Percussion
  - Eric Beach
  - Jason Haaheim
  - Jason Treuting
- Cello
  - Peter Wiley
- Flute
  - Tara Helen O'Connor
- Oboe
  - Elaine Douvas
  - Alexandra Knoll
  - Ryan Roberts
- Clarinet
  - David Krakauer
  - Anthony McGill
- Bassoon
  - Marc Goldberg
- Horn
  - Julie Landsman (master classes)
  - Barbara Jostlein Currie
  - Jeffrey Lang
  - Julia Pilant

- Composition
  - Joan Tower
  - George Tsontakis
  - Da Capo Chamber Players (Artists in residence)
- Performance Studies
  - Luis Garcia-Renart
- Vocal Arts
  - Stephanie Blythe (Artistic Director)
  - Kayo Iwama (Associate Director)
- Conducting
  - James Bagwell (Co-director)
  - Leon Botstein (Co-director)

== See also ==
- Richard B. Fisher Center for the Performing Arts
- Vinkensport, or The Finch Opera
- Shanghai Quartet
- Orion String Quartet
- Kneisel Hall
- Bard Prison Initiative
- Longy School of Music of Bard College
- Tan Dun
