= The Rossini Bicentennial Birthday Gala =

- Virgin Classics CD: 7243 5 62078 2 0

Live album by Roger Norrington
- Released: 1993 (video) and 2002 (CD)
- Venues: Avery Fisher Hall, Lincoln Center, New York City
- Genres: Opera and sacred music
- Length: 119:00
- Languages: French, Italian and Latin

The Rossini Bicentennial Birthday Gala
- EMI Records Laserdisc: LDB491007-1

The Rossini Bicentennial Birthday Gala is a live album of operatic and sacred music by Gioachino Rossini, performed by Rockwell Blake, Craig Estep, Maria Fortuna, Thomas Hampson, George Hogan, Marilyn Horne, Kathleen Kuhlmann, Mimi Lerner, Chris Merritt, Jan Opalach, Samuel Ramey, Henry Runey, Frederica von Stade, Deborah Voigt, the Concert Chorale of New York and the Orchestra of St. Luke's under the direction of Sir Roger Norrington. It was released in 1993 as a 119-minute video album and in 2002 as a 119-minute double CD. A 78-minute CD of excerpts from the concert was released in 1994.

== Background ==
In 1992, New York City's Lincoln Center for the Performing Arts hosted two gala concerts commemorating the two hundredth anniversary of Rossini's birth. The concerts were filmed for EMI Records, who edited the best of their footage into a video album that they released in 1993 on both VHS tape and twelve-inch Laserdisc. The following year, EMI issued most of the contents of their video album (arranged in a different running order) on CD: the items left out were the Overture to La gazza ladra, the quartet "Cielo il mio labbro inspira" from Bianca e Falliero, the trio "Pappataci! Che mai sento" from L'italiana in Algeri and the duet "Perché mi guardi" from Zelmira. Virgin Classics restored these omissions in a double CD of the concert that they issued in 2002.

== Recording ==
The album was compiled from recordings of concerts that took place on 29 February and 2 March 1992 in the Avery Fisher Hall at the Lincoln Center, New York City. The audio was recorded digitally.

== Packaging ==
The covers of video versions of the album and EMI's excerpts CD feature photographs taken during the concerts at which the recording was made.

== Critical reception ==
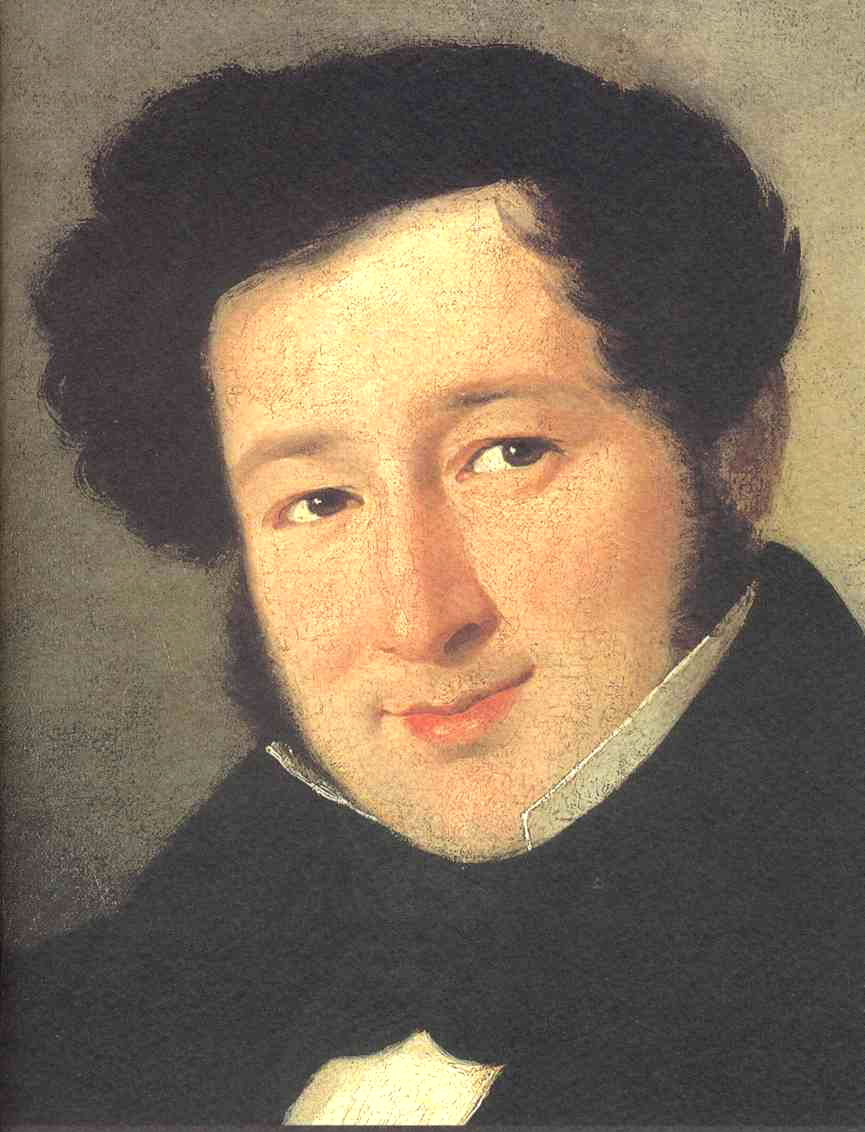
Gioacchino Rossini, painted in the first half of the nineteenth century by an unknown artist

Barrymore Laurence Scherer reviewed one of the concerts from which the album was derived in Gramophone in May 1992. The singer whose contribution he enjoyed most was Marilyn Horne, who performed not only "Mura felici" from La donna del lago but also a "Di tanti palpiti" that was to have been sung by an indisposed June Anderson. She was not as miraculous as in her prime. but "if steel [had] replaced the former velvet of Horne's tone, her passagework [remained] undiminished in splendour." The runners-up for the palm of the evening were Thomas Hampson with his "delectable" if somewhat over-familiar "Largo al factotum" from Il barbiere di Siviglia, Deborah Voigt in the "Inflammatus" from the Stabat mater and Kathleen Kuhlmann in the "Agnus Dei" from the Petite messe solennelle. His view of some of the gala's other artists was harsher. Chris Merritt sang "Asile hérédetaire" from Guillaume Tell with "insensitivity to phrase and colour, merely treating the music as a build-up for a series of high notes that sounded like blood squeezed from a stone." As for Rockwell Blake, "his grotesque rendition of 'Terra amica, ove respire' from Zelmira provided a series of bleats and squawks that were a travesty of bel canto." The concert's opening number, the overture to La gazza ladra, was disappointing too, omitting its customary cymbals in order to achieve a "bloodless correctitude in the eyes of modern scholarship". It seemed to Scherer that Rossini's music had become an industry, in thrall to academia, in which all that mattered was that more and more of his scores should be performed. Whether his music was sung beautifully or wretchedly had ceased to be important.

J. B. Steane reviewed the video version of the album in Gramophone in June 1993. The "happy event" began, he wrote, with the overture to La gazza ladra (The thieving magpie), "the only gazza recognized by the judicial bench", conducted by a man who appeared to be Jacques Offenbach but was in fact Roger Norrington. Marilyn Horne, still blessed with a royal, marvellously unwearied voice despite her advancing years, sang one of Malcom's arias from La donna del lago with rock-solid control and the precision of a pianist. Deborah Voigt was not quite so impressive in her "Inflammatus", singing with "some grandeur if little variety", but things looked up when Frederica von Stade presented an aria from La Cenerentola "with generous spirit and a winning smile". Rockwell Blake sang "runs prestissimo and high Cs galore, just as we knew he would", and his confrère, the "amazing" Chris Merritt, followed suit. Another high C came from the "hyperactive" barber of Seville, "more irrepressible than ever in the person of Thomas Hampson". Three less showy pieces were a reminder that there was more to Rossini's music than just an invitation to great singers to parade their scintillating technique. "As Kathleen Kuhlmann [sang] the 'Agnus Dei' and the chorus quietly [reiterated] 'Dona nobis pacem', there [was] a moment of something like depth." A men's chorus joined Samuel Ramey in a "fine example of Rossinian mastery" from Le siège de Corinthe. And some "serious-minded dramatic tension" was introduced with a quartet from Bianca e Falliero. Finally a fourteen-voiced ensemble from Il viaggio a Reims gave all the concert's soloists the chance to bring the house down in an extravaganza of a finale.

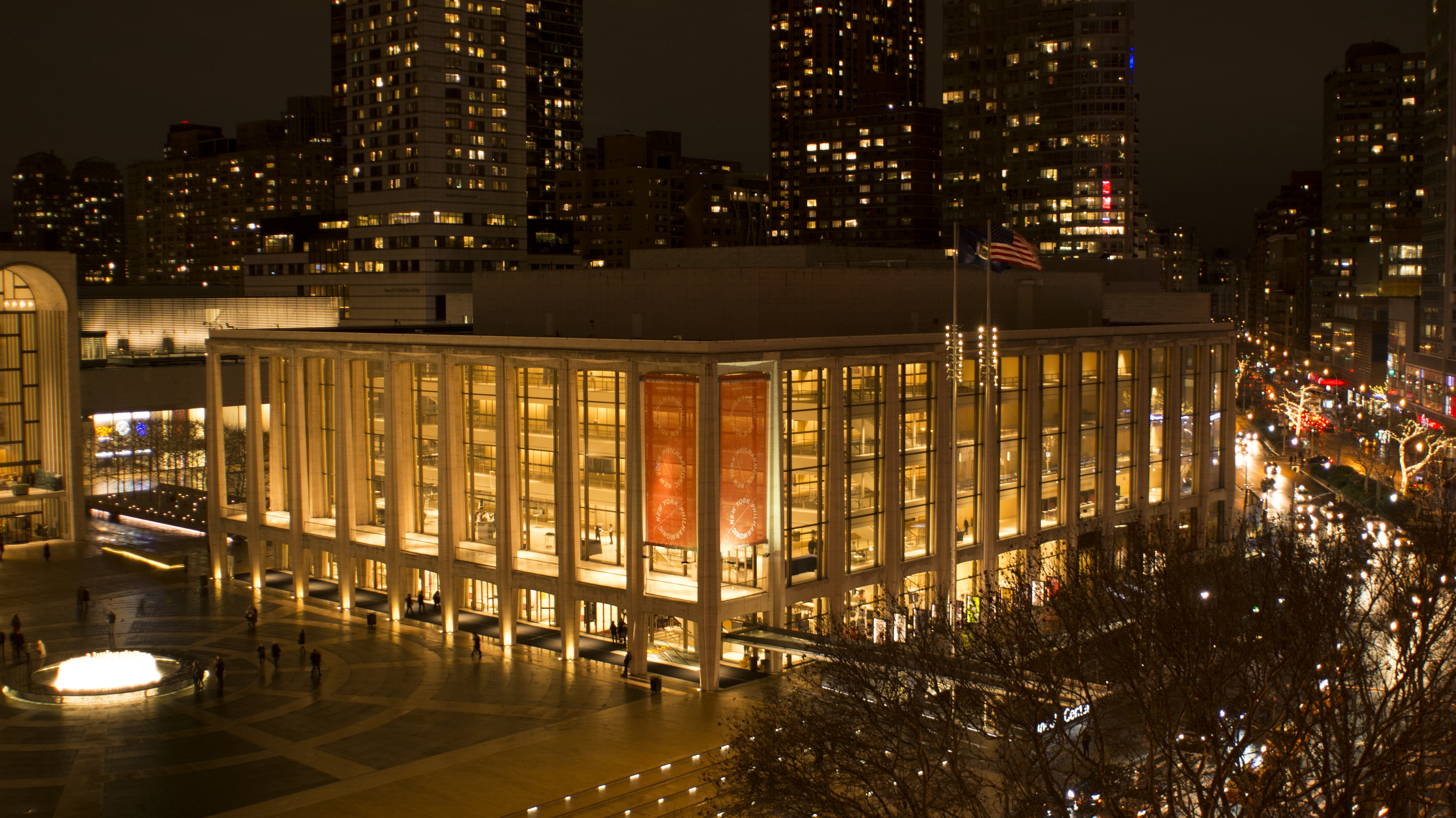
Avery Fisher Hall in 2014

Richard Osborne reviewed the CD version of the album in Gramophone in December 1994. Like Scherer and Steane, he singled out Marilyn Horne for special praise, lauding her contribution as the only "classically fine" one on the disc. He also mentioned Thomas Hampson's "over the top" aria from Il barbiere di Siviglia and the "Agnus Dei" from the Petite messe solennelle, the latter of particular interest because it was performed with Rossini's "reluctantly and tardily supplied orchestration". About the album as a whole, he was equivocal. On the one hand, he called it "spectacular", with "plenty that was fiery and eloquent", "set ablaze" by Roger Norrington's conducting. On the other hand, it had only a few items that he imagined himself wanting to hear again. He concluded by advising his readers that it was a concert best enjoyed when seen as well as heard. He had been amused, on returning from an evening out with his wife, to find his babysitter and her husband both engrossed in watching its video version on his television.

== Laserdisc and CD chapter listing ==
Gioachino Rossini (1792-1868)

La gazza ladra (Milan, 1817)

- 1 Sinfonia

La donna del lago (Naples, 1819), libretto by Andrea Leone Tottola after Walter Scott

- 2 Cavatina, Act 1: "Mura felici"
  - Marilyn Horne, Malcom, a rebel chieftain

Stabat Mater (Madrid, 1832; Bologna, 1841), text by Jacopone da Todi

- 3 "Inflammatus"
  - Deborah Voigt
  - Concert Chorale of New York

La Cenerentola (Rome, 1817), libretto by Jacopo Ferretti

- 4 Coro, scena e rondò, Act 2: "Della Fortuna... Nacqui all'affanno... Non più mesta"
  - Frederica von Stade, Angelina (Cinderella)
  - Jan Opalach, Don Magnifico, Baron of Montefiascone, Angelina's stepfather
  - Craig Estep, Don Ramiro, Prince of Salerno
  - Maria Fortuna, Clorinda, elder daughter of Magnifico
  - Mimi Lerner, Tisbe, younger daughter of Magnifico
  - Henry Runey, Dandini, valet to the Prince

Zelmira (Naples, 1822), libretto by Andrea Leone Tottola

- 5 Coro e cavatina, Act 1: "Terra amica"
  - Rockwell Blake, Ilo, Prince of Troy
  - Concert Chorale of New York

Bianca e Falliero (Milan, 1819), libretto by Felice Romani

- 6 Quartetto: "Cielo, il mio labbro ispira"
  - Maria Fortuna, Bianca, daughter of Contareno
  - Marilyn Horne, Falliero, a Venetian General
  - Chris Merritt, Contareno, a Venetian Senator
  - Henry Runey, Capellio, a Venetian Senator
  - Concert Chorale of New York

Guillaume Tell (Paris, 1829), libretto by Victor-Joseph Étienne de Jouy and L. F. Bis

- 7 Aria, Act 4: "Ne m'abandonne point... Asile hérédetaire"
  - Chris Merritt, Arnold Melchtal
  - Concert Chorale of New York

Il barbiere di Siviglia (Rome, 1816), libretto by Cesare Sterbini after Pierre Beaumarchais

- 8 Cavatina, Act 1: "La lan la lera... Largo al factotum"
  - Thomas Hampson, a barber

Petite messe solennelle (Paris, 1863; orchestration: Paris, 1867)

- 9 "Agnus Dei"
  - Kathleen Kuhlmann
  - Concert Chorale of New York

L'italiana in Algeri (Venice, 1813), libretto by Angelo Anelli

- 10 Terzetto: "Pappataci! Che mai sento"
  - Rockwell Blake, Lindoro, in love with Isabella
  - Thomas Hampson, Taddeo, an elderly Italian
  - Jan Opalach, Mustafà, the Bey of Algiers

Zelmira

- 11 Duettino: "Perché mi guardi, e piangi"
  - Deborah Voigt, Zelmira, daughter of Polidoro, King of Lesbos
  - Kathleen Kuhlmann, Emma, her confidant

Le siège de Corinthe (Paris, 1826), libretto by Luigi Balocchi and Alexandre Soumet

- 12 Coro e cavatina, Act 1: "La flamme rapide... La gloire et la fortune"
  - Samuel Ramey, Mahomet II
  - Concert Chorale of New York

Il viaggio a Reims (Paris, 1825), libretto by Luigi Balocchi

- 13 Gran pezzo concertato a 14 voci, Act 2: "A tal colpo aspettato"
  - Deborah Voigt, Madame Cortese, the Tyrolean hostess of a spa hotel
  - Maria Fortuna, the Contessa di Folleville, a fashionable young woman
  - Frederica von Stade, Corinna, a famous Roman poet
  - Marilyn Horne, the Marchesa Melibea, the Polish widow of an Italian general killed on his wedding night
  - Mimi Lerner, Della, a young Greek girl, Corinna's travelling companion
  - Kathleen Kuhlmann, Modestine, the Contessa di Folleville's chamber-maid
  - Chris Merritt, the Conte di Libenskof, a Russian general in love with the Marchesa Melibea
  - Rockwell Blake, the Cavaliere Belfiore, a handsome young French officer and amateur painter
  - Craig Estep, Zeffirino, a courier
  - Jan Opalach, the Barone di Trombonok, a German major and music lover
  - Thomas Hampson, Don Alvaro, a Spanish admiral in love with the Marchesa Melibea
  - Samuel Ramey, Lord Sidney, an English colonel secretly in love with Corinna
  - Henry Runey, Don Profondo, a scholar and antiquarian, a friend of Corinna
  - George Hogan, Don Prudenzio, a physician at the spa

== Personnel ==
=== Performers ===
- Rockwell Blake, tenor
- Craig Estep, tenor
- Maria Fortuna, soprano
- Thomas Hampson, baritone
- George Hogan, bass
- Marilyn Horne, mezzo-soprano
- Kathleen Kuhlmann. mezzo-soprano
- Mimi Lerner (1945-2007), mezzo-soprano
- Chris Merritt, tenor
- Jan Opalach, bass-baritone
- Samuel Ramey, bass
- Henry Runey, bass
- Frederica von Stade, mezzo-soprano
- Deborah Voigt. soprano
- Melanie Feld, cor anglais (in Zelmira duettino)
- Deborah Hoffman, harp (in Zelmira duettino)
- Concert Chorale of New York
- Orchestra of St Luke's
- Sir Roger Norrington, conductor

=== Other ===
- Matthew A. Epstein, artistic consultant
- Philip Gossett, musical adviser
- John Goberman, video producer
- Kirk Browning, video director

== Release history ==
In 1993, EMI Records released a 119-minute, thirteen-item version of the album on VHS (UK catalogue number MVD491007-3) and Laserdisc (UK catalogue number LDB491007-1, US catalogue number 0777 7 40300-1 4). Both issues provided 4:3 NTSC colour video and stereo sound. As of September 2019, the album had not been issued on DVD or Blu-ray.

In 1994, EMI Records issued a 78-minute, nine-item version of the album on CD (catalogue number 0777 7 54653 2 0 or CDC 7 54643 2). The CD was accompanied by a 32-page insert booklet featuring an essay by the Rossini scholar Philip Gossett in English, French and German, texts in French, Italian and Latin and translations of those texts into English, French and German.

In 2002, Virgin Classics issued a 119-minute version of the album on CD (catalogue number 0946 349953 2 0 or 7243 5 62078 2 0).
