= Mimi Lerner =

American opera singer

Mimi Lerner (May 20, 1945 – March 29, 2007) was a Polish-American mezzo-soprano, and later head of the voice department at Carnegie Mellon University.

== Life and career ==
Lerner was born Emilia Lipczer in 1945 in Sambir, Ukraine to Jewish parents. At the time of her birth, her family had been hiding for several years in the woods to avoid Nazi persecution, and Lerner's first year of life was spent living in secret in the forest. Her grandparents died in Nazi concentration camps in Poland. After the end of World War II, the family moved to Paris where they resided for seven years.

Lerner and her immediate family moved to the United States and settled in the Bronx in 1953. She attended the High School of Music & Art in Manhattan before pursuing studies in music at Queens College (QC). There she earned a Bachelor of Music Education in the late 1960s. While a student at Queens College she attended a performance by the Pittsburgh Symphony Orchestra at Carnegie Hall in 1967 where she met her future husband, the flautist Martin Lerner. After completing her degree at QC, she moved to Pittsburgh and married Martin in 1969.

She was teaching in Pittsburgh, Pennsylvania while earning a master's degree at Carnegie Mellon. What started as a singing hobby led to her debut at the New York City Opera in 1979, singing Sextus in La clemenza di Tito. Later NYCO assignments included Adalgisa in Norma, Bradamante in Alcina, Smeton in Anna Bolena, and leading roles in the Central Park trilogy (which consists of Deborah Drattell and Wendy Wasserstein's The Festival of Regrets, Michael Torke and A. R. Gurney's Strawberry Fields, and Robert Beaser and Terrence McNally's The Food of Love).

Since the early 1980s, she was a regular guest artist with opera companies throughout the United States, including the Dallas Opera, Glimmerglass Opera, the Houston Grand Opera, the John F. Kennedy Center for the Performing Arts, the Metropolitan Opera, the Opera Theater of Pittsburgh, Pittsburgh Opera, the Santa Fe Opera, Seattle Opera, and the Washington National Opera. She appeared on the international stage at La Scala, the Théâtre du Châtelet, and the Glyndebourne Festival.

== Death ==
She died in the Pittsburgh neighborhood of Oakland from complications of a heart tumor, which had been diagnosed a dozen years earlier. She was 61 years old.

== See also ==
- The Rossini Bicentennial Birthday Gala
