= Pasticcio =

Opera or other musical work composed by many people

In music, a pasticcio or pastiche is an opera or other musical work composed of works by different composers who may or may not have been working together, or an adaptation or localization of an existing work that is loose, unauthorized, or inauthentic.

== Etymology ==
The term is first attested in the 16th century referring both to a kind of pie containing meat and pasta (see pastitsio) and to a literary mixture; for music, the earliest attestation is 1795 in Italian and 1742 in English. It derives from the post-classical Latin pasticium (13th century), a pie or pasty.

== In opera ==
In the 18th century, opera pasticcios were frequently made by composers such as Handel, for example Oreste (1734), Alessandro Severo (1738) and Giove in Argo (1739), as well as Gluck, and Johann Christian Bach. These composite works would consist mainly of portions of other composers' work, although they could also include original composition. The portions borrowed from other composers would be more or less freely adapted, especially in the case of arias in pasticcio operas by substituting a new text for the original one. In late 18th-century English pasticcios, for instance by Samuel Arnold or William Shield, the "borrowed" music could be Irish or British folksongs.

== In instrumental music ==
Instrumental works would also sometimes be assembled from pre-existing compositions, a notable instance of this being the first four piano concertos of Wolfgang Amadeus Mozart. These concertos (K. 37, 39–41) were assembled almost entirely from keyboard sonata movements by contemporary composers, to which the boy Mozart added orchestral parts supporting the keyboard soloist.

== See also ==
- Pastiche
- The Enchanted Island (opera)

== Bibliography ==
- "Pasticcio" in Don Michael Randel, ed., The New Harvard Dictionary of Music. Cambridge, MA: Belknap Press of Harvard University Press, 1986 (ISBN 0-674-61525-5), p. 614.
- Warrack, John and West, Ewan (1992), The Oxford Dictionary of Opera, 782 pages. ISBN 0-19-869164-5.
- Rice, John A., "Montezuma at Eszterház: A Pasticcio on a New World Theme".
