= Limoges Conservatory =

Coordinates: 45°49′57″N 1°15′32″E

Limoges Conservatory or Conservatoire à rayonnement régional de Limoges is a musical conservatory in Limoges, France. As of 2012 it had an enrollment of 2000 students and 79 teachers.
