= Alessandra Marc =

American opera singer

Alessandra Marc, born Judith Borden (born July 29, 1957) is an American dramatic soprano who has appeared at many of the world's opera houses and orchestras. Marc is particularly known for her interpretations of the works of Richard Strauss, Richard Wagner, Giuseppe Verdi, music of the Second Viennese School, and the title role in Puccini's Turandot.

== Early life and education ==
Alessandra Marc was born Judith Borden in Berlin, Germany to a German mother and an American father who worked for the United States Army. Marc spent much of her childhood traveling around the world as an "army brat". Her parents ultimately divorced, and she spent her high school years in the Baltimore area. Marc first became interested in becoming an opera singer while attending Glen Burnie High School, where she began taking voice lessons. Marc studied at the University of Maryland and privately with soprano Marilyn Cotlow, who originated the role of Lucy in Menotti's The Telephone. Under Cotlow's mentorship, Marc began entering voice competitions winning several honors including two Richard Tucker Music Foundation Career Grants, one in 1986 and the other in 1987, and the Metropolitan Opera Auditions in 1983.

== Career ==
Marc began her career singing in the chorus and in smaller roles with the Washington National Opera in the early 1980s. Her professional solo debut with the company was as Giannetta in Donizetti's L'elisir d'amore. In 1983, she sang the role of Mariana in Wagner's Das Liebesverbot at the Waterloo Festival. In 1984, she made her New York City debut at the 92nd Street Y, singing Shostakovich's Fourteenth Symphony with Gerard Schwarz and the Y Chamber Symphony. Shortly thereafter, Marc made several notable appearances at different music festivals such as the role of Iphigenia in Wagner's resetting of Gluck's Iphigénie en Tauride at the Waterloo Festival and the role of Ismene/ Elettra, in Richard Strauss's resetting of Mozart's Idomeneo at the Mostly Mozart Festival among others.

Marc first came to broader public attention at the Wexford Festival in 1987 as Lisabetta in Giordano's La cena delle beffe. That same year, she made her Carnegie Hall debut as Silvana in Ottorino Respighi's La Fiamma with Robert Bass and the Collegiate Chorale. In 1988 she made her debut with Santa Fe Opera as Maria in Richard Strauss' Friedenstag, a role which she later reprised at Carnegie Hall with Robert Bass. She also made her debut with Lyric Opera of Chicago in the title role of Verdi's Aida and her debut with Connecticut Grand Opera in the title role of Puccini's Tosca. In 1989 she made debuts at the Metropolitan Opera and the San Francisco Opera both in the title role of Verdi's Aida. She also performed and recorded the role of Maria in Richard Strauss' Friedenstag with Robert Bass and the Collegiate Choral and Orchestra at Carnegie Hall. That same year, she performed the title role of Ariadne in Ariadne auf Naxos at the Washington Concert Opera.

In 1992, she resumed the title role of Richard Strauss' Ariadne auf Naxos in her debut at the Vienna State Opera and her debut at the Rome Opera in the title role of Verdi's Aida. She also made her debut with Grand Théâtre de Bordeaux as Elisabeth in Verdi's Don Carlo and sang Turandot with the Opera Company of Philadelphia. In 1993, Marc opened up the Ravinia Festival with the Chicago Symphony Orchestra. In 1994, Marc made her debut at the Royal Opera House, Covent Garden in the title role of Puccini's Turandot. She also sang Beethoven's Ninth Symphony with Christoph Eschenbach and the Boston Symphony Orchestra at the Tanglewood Music Festival. In 1995 Marc gave a critically acclaimed recital of Handel, Mozart and Bellini arias at the Mostly Mozart Festival, gave a concert of the works of Verdi and Ravel with the New Jersey Symphony Orchestra, and sang the role of Chrysothemis in Strauss' Elektra with the Chicago Symphony. In 1996, she sang Turandot with Opera Pacific. In 1998 she sang Turandot with the Milwaukee Symphony and with Michigan Opera Theatre. She also gave a concert of arias with the Dallas Symphony and sang the role of Brünnhilde in Wagner's Die Walküre with Rome Opera.

In the 2005–2006 season, Marc performed the title role in Puccini's Turandot with Zubin Mehta and the Maggio Musicale Fiorentino, and reprised the role with the same company in the 2006–2007 season at the New National Theatre Tokyo. In 2007, she also performed the title role in Richard Strauss' Salome with Orquestra Nacional do Porto.

In the 2007–2008 season, Marc made appearances at the Washington National Opera with Plácido Domingo conducting and at the Kennedy Center with the Choral Arts Society of Washington. She also gave several recitals throughout the United States. Among other appearances in the 2008–2009 season, she sang with the National Gallery Orchestra and the Alexandria Symphony Orchestra.

Marc returned to the New York stage in the 2009–2010 season, in concert at Carnegie Hall's Weill Recital Hall on February 6, 2010.

In addition, Marc has sung her signature role, Turandot, at Opéra Bastille in Paris, the Teatro alla Scala in Milan, the Washington National Opera, and the Metropolitan Opera, among others.

== Personal life ==
Alessandra Marc has been married twice, first to Remy David (the son of her mentor, Marilyn Cotlow) and then to former stockbroker Bart Brakel. Marc and Brakel have one daughter together, Olivia, and they live in Chantilly, Virginia.

== Opera roles ==
- Aïda, Aïda (Verdi)
- Anita, Jonny spielt auf (Ernst Krenek)
- Bianca, Eine florentinische Tragödie (Alexander von Zemlinsky)
- Brünnhilde, Die Walküre (Wagner)
- Ariadne, Ariadne auf Naxos (Richard Strauss)
- Chrysothemis, Elektra (Richard Strauss)
- Elektra, Elektra (Richard Strauss)
- Elisabeth, Don Carlo (Verdi)
- Giannetta L'elisir d'amore (Donizetti)
- Ismene (Elettra), Idomeneo (Mozart) (reset by Richard Strauss)

- Iphigenia, Iphigénie en Tauride (Gluck) (reset by Wagner)
- Lady Cifford, Henry Cifford (Isaac Albéniz)
- Lisabetta, La cena delle beffe (Giordano)
- Maria, Friedenstag (Richard Strauss)
- Mariana, Das Liebesverbot (Wagner)
- Salome, Salome (Richard Strauss)
- Sieglinde, Die Walküre (Wagner)
- Silvana La Fiamma (Ottorino Respighi)
- Tosca, Tosca (Puccini)
- Turandot, Turandot (Puccini)

== Discography ==
=== Concert recordings ===
- Beethoven's Symphony No. 9 with Daniel Barenboim and the Chicago Symphony Orchestra, Erato label 1994, ASIN: B000005EBQ.
- Alban Berg's Lyric Suite and Lulu Suite with Giuseppe Sinopoli and the Sächsische Staatskapelle Dresden, Erato (Warner) 2003 ASIN: B00006L9SO (from Amazon.de).
- Alban Berg's Orchesterlieder (Altenberg-Lieder Op. 4) with Giuseppe Sinopoli and the Sächsische Staatskapelle Dresden, Teldec (Warner) 2000 ASIN: B00003INIA (from Amazon.de).
- Arthur Honegger's Le Roi David with Jean-Claude Casadesus and the Orchestre National de Lille, EMI label 1993, ASIN: B00000DNSH.
- Mahler's Symphony No. 8 with Sir Colin Davis and the Berlin Radio Symphony Orchestra, RCA label 2004, ASIN: B0002GAAFC.
- Mahler's Symphony No. 8 and Schoenberg's Die Jakobsleiter with Michael Gielen and the SWR Sinfonieorchester, Hanssler Classics label, ASIN: B00006JKQY.
- Mahler's Symphony No. 8 with Edo de Waart and the Netherlands Radio Philharmonic Orchestra, RCA label 1994, ASIN: B0011ZLGW4.
- Schoenberg's Orchesterlieder Op.8 (Nr. 1-6) with Giuseppe Sinopoli and the Sächsische Staatskapelle Dresden, Erato (Warner) 2004, ASIN: B00013UTD4 (from Amazon.de).
- Schoenberg's Pierrot lunaire and Erwartung with Giuseppe Sinopoli and the Sächsische Staatskapelle Dresden, Teldec label 1999, ASIN: B00000JLLN.
- Richard Strauss's Ein Heldenleben and the final scene from Salome with Donald Runnicles and the NDR Sinfonieorchester Hamburg, Wea Apex Classics label 2006, ASIN: B00005QHTD.
- Verdi's Requiem with Daniel Barenboim and the Chicago Symphony Orchestra, Teldec label 2000, ASIN: B00004SCXS.
- Alexander von Zemlinsky's Lyrische Symphonie and Symphonische Gesänge with Riccardo Chailly with the Royal Concertgebouw Orchestra, Polygram Records 1995, ASIN: B00000424B .
- Alexander von Zemlinsky's Lyrische Symphonie, Bianca in Eine florentinische Tragödie, and Three Psalms with Riccardo Chailly and the Berlin Radio Symphony Orchestra, Polygram Records 2003, ASIN: B00008MLU3.
- Wagner 3: Siegfried; Lohengrin; Tristan und Isolde; Die Walküre (also titled The Wagner Collection and Wagner from Seattle) with Gerard Schwarz and the Seattle Symphony Orchestra, Delos Records 1994, ASIN: B0000006Y6.

=== Opera recordings ===
- Anita in Ernst Krenek's Jonny spielt auf with Lothar Zagrosek and the Gewandhausorchester Leipzig, Polygram Records 2002, ASIN: B00000E551.
- Chrysothemis in Richard Strauss' Elektra with Daniel Barenboim and the Berlin State Opera, TELDEC label 1996, ASIN: B000000SRU.
- Elektra in Richard Strauss' Elektra with Giuseppe Sinopoli and the Vienna Philharmonic Orchestra, Deutsche Grammophon 1997, ASIN: B0018O809A.
- Lady Cifford in Isaac Albéniz's Henry Cifford with José De Eusebio and the Orquesta Sinfónicia de Madrid, Decca label 2003, ASIN: B0018NETFU.
- Maria in Richard Strauss' Friedenstag with Robert Bass and the Collegiate Choral and Orchestra, Koch label 1995, ASIN: B000001SET.
- Sieglinde in Wagner's Die Walküre with Christoph von Dohnányi and the Cleveland Orchestra, Polygram Records 1997, ASIN: B0000041JY.
- Turandot in Puccini's Turandot with Jose Collado and the Bilbao Symphony Orchestra, Rtve Classics label 2006, ASIN: B000EBDA0M.

=== Solo recordings ===
- American Diva: Arias by Verdi, Puccini, Cilea, Charpentier, Wagner, Catalani with Heinz Wallberg and the New Zealand Symphony Orchestra, Delos Records 1992, ASIN: B0000006XU.
- Opera Gala with Andrew Litton and the Dallas Symphony Orchestra, Delos Records 2000, ASIN: B00004TKHD.

== Watch and listen ==
Listen to Alessandra Marc sing on YouTube the role of Elisabeth in Verdi's Don Carlo.
