= LOOK Musical Theatre =

American musical theater company

LOOK Musical Theatre (LOOK) was a professional musical theatre company based in Tulsa, Oklahoma. The organization, governed by an elected board of directors, followed a repertory model in presenting a summer festival program of musicals and comic opera. LOOK's annual summer season of performances at the Tulsa Performing Arts Center was known as "The LOOK Festival."

The company was founded by John and Jane Everett in 1983 as a non-profit community theater called The Gilbert and Sullivan Society of Tulsa. It changed its name to Light Opera Oklahoma in 1997 in conjunction with its transformation into a professional repertory company and expanded its repertoire to works outside the corpus of Gilbert and Sullivan's comic operas. Eric Gibson was named the artistic director in 2002. The company rebranded itself again in 2012 under its present name.

LOOK drew its orchestral forces from the Tulsa Symphony Orchestra and often recruited its dancers from the Tulsa Ballet and Tulsa Youth Ballet. The company occasionally traveled to other cities in Oklahoma, but most productions took place at the Williams Theatre of the Tulsa Performing Arts Center in downtown Tulsa. LOOK also held evening cabarets for Valentine's Day and during the fall season.

Reviewing My Fair Lady in 2009, Urban Tulsa Weekly wrote, "LOOK consistently delivers fantastic performances, year after year, during the Tulsa Performing Arts Center's SummerStage Festival.... The company draws talented professional singers from all over the U.S."

The company shut down operations in 2015 after accumulating debts.

== Performance history ==
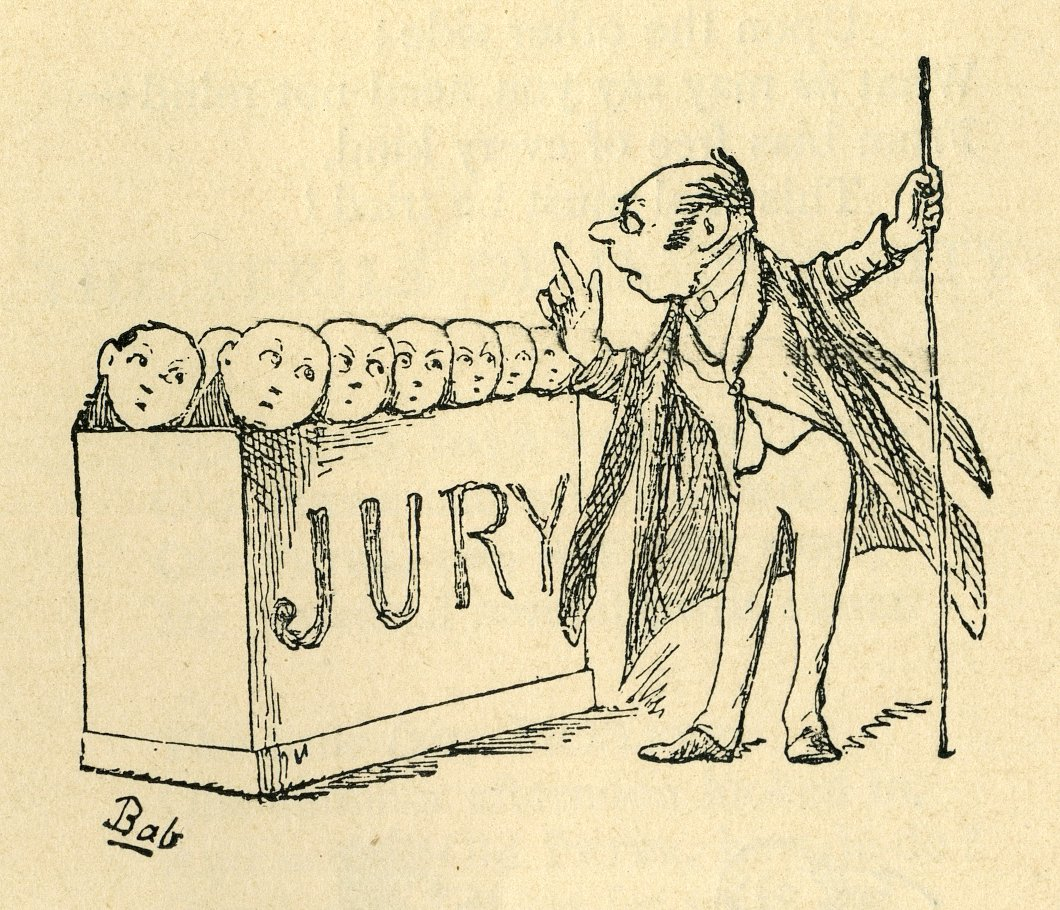
Trial by Jury was the company's first production

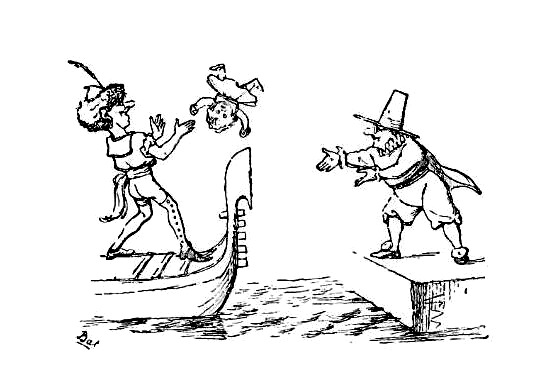
The Gondoliers was its last production

From its founding in 1983, when its first production was Trial by Jury, to 1996, the company produced a single Gilbert and Sullivan opera each year, except in 1987, when it instead presented two musicals: Man of La Mancha and Side by Side by Sondheim. Some of the early productions were directed by John Reed, a former principal comedian with the D'Oyly Carte Opera Company. In 1997, it began to expand its repertory, presenting Little Mary Sunshine as well as Princess Ida. After this, each season included a Savoy opera together with a mix of operettas and musicals, generally totaling three productions, presented in repertory, except that from 2011 to 2013, the company did not present any Gilbert and Sullivan pieces. Its seasons, after 1998, included the following shows:

- 1998 The Mikado, The New Moon, Pineapple Poll, Trial by Jury
- 1999 The Student Prince, The Pirates of Penzance, Ernest in Love, Pineapple Poll, & Cox & Box
- 2000 The Desert Song, H.M.S. Pinafore, The Yeomen of the Guard
- 2001 The Mikado, My Fair Lady, Naughty Marietta
- 2002 Iolanthe, The Merry Widow, I Do! I Do!, Master Class
- 2003 The Pirates of Penzance, Die Fledermaus (as Revenge of the Bat), A Funny Thing Happened on the Way to the Forum
- 2004 H.M.S. Pinafore, The Threepenny Opera, Guys & Dolls, Jazz concert
- 2005 The Mikado, Too Many Sopranos, Fiddler on the Roof, La Périchole
- 2006 South Pacific, The Sorcerer, El barberillo de Lavapiés (The Little Barber of Lavapies)
- 2007 The Music Man, Sweeney Todd, Naughty Marietta, Trial by Jury
- 2008 Into the Woods, The Pirates of Penzance, Candide, Oh, Coward!
- 2009 My Fair Lady, The Gondoliers, A Little Night Music
- 2010 Kiss Me, Kate, The Boy Friend, Patience
- 2011 Evita, Trouble in Tahiti, The Light in the Piazza
- 2012 Gypsy, Avenue Q, A Funny Thing Happened on the Way to the Forum
- 2013 Hello, Dolly!, Side by Side by Sondheim, The Drowsy Chaperone
- 2014 Sweeney Todd, The Gondoliers
