= Alessandro Severo =

Opera by Georg Friedrich Händel

- Opera by George Frideric Handel
- George Frideric Handel, portrayed by Balthasar Denner, 1729
- Librettist: Apostolo Zeno
- Language: Italian
- Premiere: 25 February 1738; King's Theatre, Haymarket, London

Alessandro Severo (Alexander Severus, HWV A13) is an opera by George Frideric Handel composed in 1738. It is one of Handel's three surviving pasticcio works, made up of the music and arias of his previous operas Giustino, Berenice and Arminio. Only the overture and recitatives (as well as the words) were new. The impresario Johann Jacob Heidegger probably selected the 1717 libretto by Apostolo Zeno, originally written for Antonio Lotti and re-used by many composers thereafter.

== Performance history ==
Alessandro Severo was not a success at its premiere under the direction of the composer on 25 February 1738 at the King's Theatre, London.

== Roles ==
Roles, voice types, and premiere cast
Role	Voice type	Premiere Cast, 25 February 1738
Sallustia	soprano	Elisabeth Duparc ("La Francesina")
Claudio	soprano	Margherita Chimenti ("La Droghierina")
Giulia	contralto	Antonia Merighi
Eurilla	mezzo-soprano	Maria Antonia Marchesini ("La Lucchesina")
Alessandro	mezzo-soprano castrato	Caffarelli
Marziano	bass	Antonio Montagnana

== Synopsis ==
The opera is based upon the story of the Roman Emperor Alexander Severus.

== Recording ==
The world premiere recording was produced by MDG - Musikproduktion Dabringhaus und Grimm and performed by Armonia Atenea on period instruments under the baton of George Petrou, with Mary-Ellen Nesi as Alessandro, Kristina Hammarström as Giulia, Marita Solberg as Salustia, Irini Karaianni as Albina, Gemma Bertagnoli as Claudio and Petros Magoulas as Marziano and dedicated to Anthony Hicks. www.mdg.de
