= Tulsa Symphony =

- Founded: 2005
- Location: Tulsa, Oklahoma
- Website: www.tulsasymphony.org

The Tulsa Symphony is a professional orchestra based in Tulsa, Oklahoma. It was formed in 2005 by musicians from the Tulsa Philharmonic, which ended in 2002. Tulsa Symphony began performing with other cultural organizations in early 2006, and presented its first concert in November 2006. Its members also perform with the LOOK Musical Theatre (formerly Light Opera Oklahoma).

The Tulsa Symphony follows a different structure, a model of orchestral governance that incorporates the musicians into all levels of the organization. Musicians serve as performing artists, and hold executive roles on the orchestra's staff, serve on the board of directors, and participate in 12 committees that make decisions for the organization. Rather than operating via collective bargaining agreements with Tulsa Symphony, in which musicians negotiate every few years for a new contract, orchestra members are self-governed, an approach supported by the American Federation of Musicians Local 94, a union for professional musicians. Musicians, board and staff members are integrated at all levels of decision- and policymaking.
