= 21st Century Symphony =

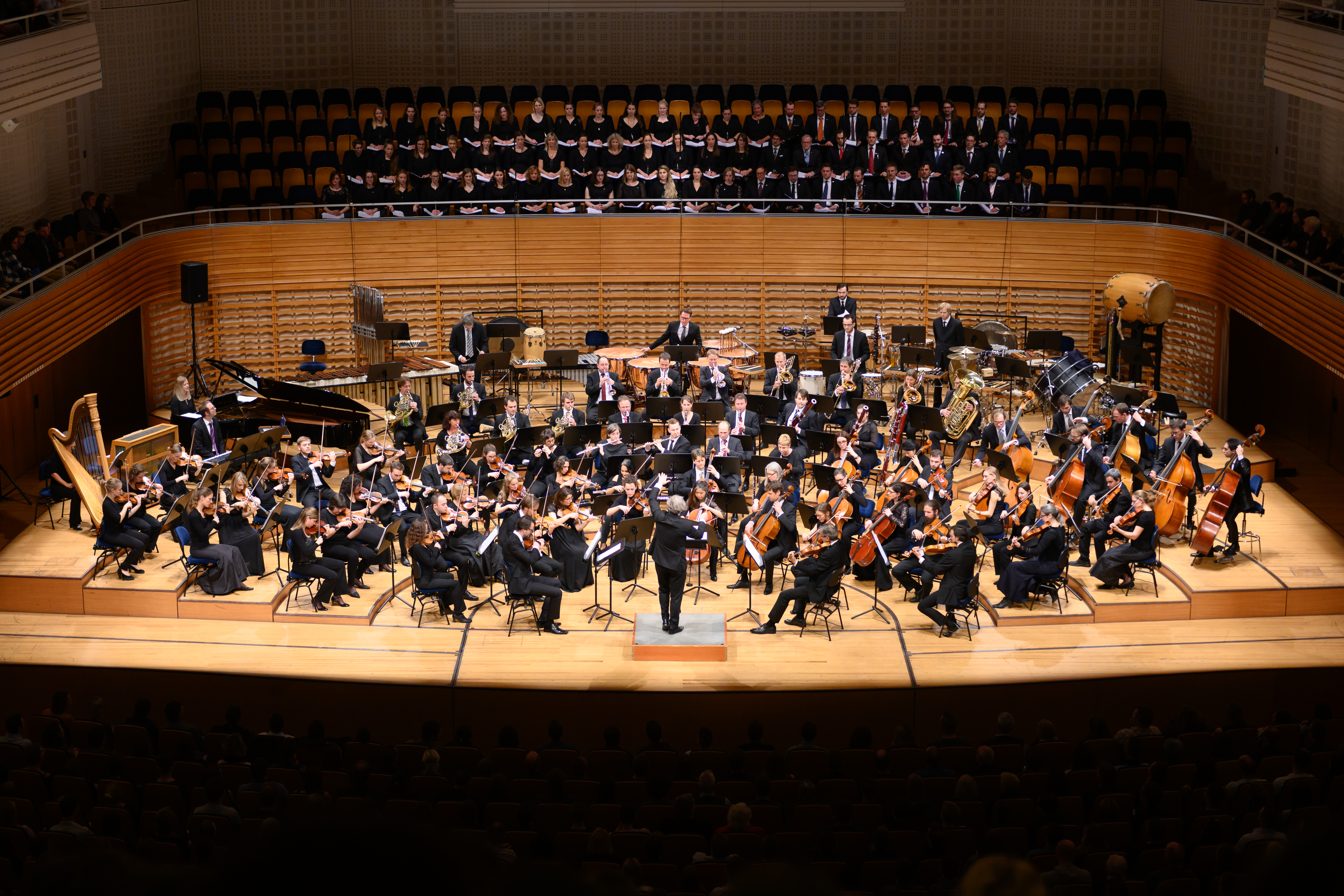
21st Century Symphony Orchestra in concert (2018).

The 21st Century Symphony Orchestra is a European orchestra. It was founded in 1999 by conductor Ludwig Wicki. The orchestra performs live concerts featuring soundtracks written by notable composers for major motion picture productions. The orchestra performs in various cities throughout Europe, although most performances take place at the Lucerne Culture and Congress Centre in Lucerne, Switzerland.

Soundtracks featured in recent concerts have included songs from Lord of the Rings, Star Trek, and the James Bond film series.

The 21st Century Orchestra helped record a live orchestral version of the compilation album Fairytales – Best of 2006–2014 with Finnish rock band Sunrise Avenue.

In May 2017, Foreigner performed two sold-out shows in Lucerne, together with the 21st Century Symphony Orchestra & Chorus, conducted by Ernst van Tiel. Recordings of these concerts were released as "FOREIGNER with the 21st Century Symphony Orchestra & Chorus", available in CD, DVD, and double vinyl.
