= Friedenstag =

Opera by Richard Strauss

- Opera by Richard Strauss
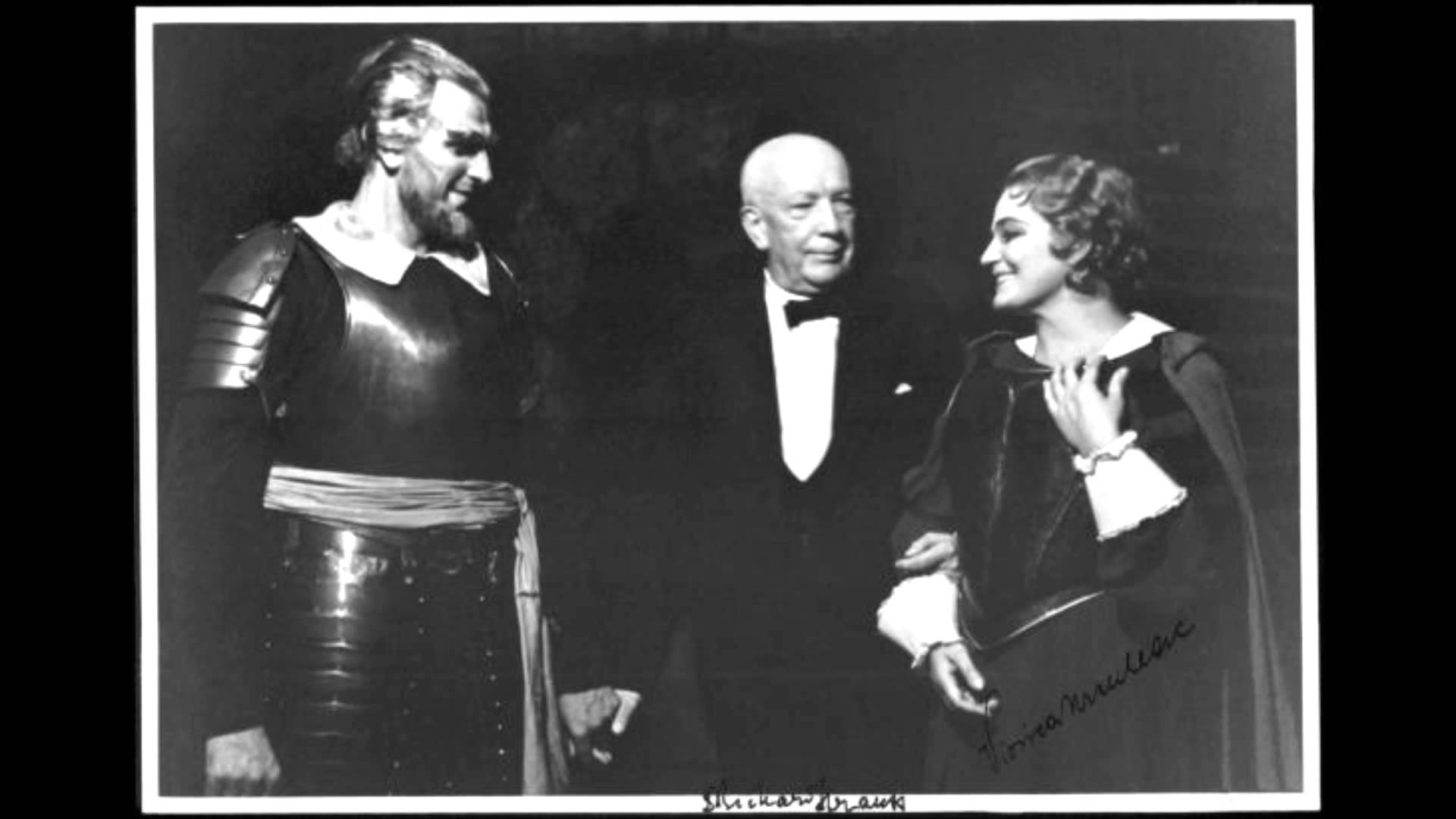
- The composer with Hotter and Ursuleac, singers of leading parts, in 1939
- Librettist: Joseph Gregor
- Language: German
- Premiere: 24 July 1938; National Theatre Munich

Friedenstag (Peace Day) is an opera in one act by Richard Strauss, his Opus 81 and TrV 271, to a German libretto by Joseph Gregor. The opera was premiered at the National Theatre Munich on 24 July 1938 and dedicated to the leading singer Viorica Ursuleac and her husband, conductor Clemens Krauss. Strauss had intended Friedenstag as part of a double-bill, to be conducted by Karl Böhm in Dresden, that would include as the second part his next collaboration with Gregor, Daphne. The opera thematically expresses anti-war sentiments, which William Mann has described as "a determined counter to the militaristic policies of Nazi Germany". These caused the work to be shelved after the outbreak of World War II.

== Composition history ==
Stefan Zweig came up with the idea of the opera, which he outlined in a letter to Strauss following up a meeting between the two at the Salzburg Festival in 1934. Both Zweig and Strauss were united in their common opposition to the growing militarism and anti-Semitism of the Nazis. Strauss had hoped to work again with Stefan Zweig on a new project. However, since their previous collaboration of Die schweigsame Frau had ended in the work being banned, Strauss could not work openly with the Jewish Zweig. While the idea for the story was from Zweig, he then suggested Gregor as a "safe" collaborator for the actual writing of the libretto. Strauss reluctantly agreed. Zweig's influence on the work nonetheless remained in its "form and dramatic substance". The libretto and draft of the opera were completed quickly, by 24 January 1936 and the orchestration six months later on 16 June.

The work is scores for 3 flutes (3rd doubling piccolo), 2 oboes, English horn, clarinet in C, 2 clarinets, bass clarinet, 3 bassoons, contrabassoon 6 horns, 4 trumpets, 4 trombones, bass tuba, timpani, percussion: (Bass drum, snare drum, tenor drum, tam-tam) and, strings (16,16,12,10,8). The onstage band contains Trumpet, glockenspiel, and organ.

== Performance history ==
The opera was premiered at the National Theatre Munich on 24 July 1938 with Clemens Krauss conducting. The opera was performed often around Germany, with Adolf Hitler and other top Nazis attending a performance in Vienna on 10 June 1939, which formed part of the celebrations of Strauss' 75th birthday. Performances were halted soon after the start of the second world war. In May 1949, to celebrate his 85th birthday, there were simultaneous performances of the opera in Paris and Brussels, broadcast by French radio. In Germany, Friedenstag was revived in Munich in 1960 and in Dresden in 1995. Pamela Potter has performed a scholarly analysis of the pacifist and anti-war subtext of the opera. The work was given its United States premiere under the direction of Walter Ducloux at the University of Southern California in 1967. The first professional production in the US took place at the Santa Fe Opera on 28 July 1988 with a cast that included Richard Lewis, Alessandra Marc, and Mark Lundberg.

== Roles ==
Roles, voice types, premiere cast
Role	Voice type	Premiere cast, 24 July 1938 Conductor: Clemens Krauss
Commandant of the beleaguered town	baritone	Hans Hotter
Maria, his wife	soprano	Viorica Ursuleac
A sergeant (Wachtmeister)	bass	Georg Hann
A corporal (Schütze)	tenor	Julius Patzak
A private soldier (Konstabel)	tenor	Georg Wieter
A musketeer	bass	Karl Schmidt
A bugler	bass	Willi Merkert
An officer	baritone	Emil Graf
A front-line officer	baritone	Josef Knapp
A Piedmontese	tenor	Peter Anders
The Holsteiner, commanding the besieging army	bass	Ludwig Weber
The burgomaster	tenor	Karl Ostertag
The bishop	baritone	Theo Reuter
A woman of the people	soprano	Else Schürhoff
Soldiers of the garrison and of the besieging army, elders of the town and women of the deputation to the commandant, townspeople

== Synopsis ==
Place: The citadel of a beleaguered Catholic town in Germany under siege by Protestant troops from Holstein

Time: 24 October 1648, the last day of the Thirty Years' War

The Sergeant of the Guard receives a report from a private that the enemy has just set fire to a farm. A young Italian messenger from Piedmont arrives with a letter from the Emperor to the town Commandant, and then sings of his homeland. The munitions officer, a musketeer and other soldiers mockingly comment on the youth as one who has never known war, just as they have never known peace. The soldiers then hear distant noises, thinking at first that these are the enemy, but then realizing it is the townspeople approaching the fortress, the Commandant appears to address the townspeople. The Mayor and a prelate appeal to the Commandant to surrender the town, claiming that both their side and the enemy are suffering needlessly. The Commandant, however, wants only total victory and dismisses the sentiments. An officer from the front appears and informs the Commandant that the town will fall unless the ammunition under the fortress is used. The Commandant refuses to release the ammunition for combat.

The Commandant reads the letter from the Emperor to the townsfolk. The Emperor has declared that the town must hold, with no surrender. The people protest strongly, at 30 years of continuous war. The Commandant is shaken by the reaction, and orders the crowd to disperse and wait a further signal from him. He then orders his soldiers to collect the gunpowder underneath the fortress and to give him the fuse. The Commandant recalls how the Sergeant saved his life at the battle of Magdeburg, and now in turn offers the Sergeant a chance to leave the fortress. The Sergeant declines, along with the munitions officer and private. After thanking the Italian messenger, the Commandant orders his troops to work.

Maria, the Commandant's wife, enters the citadel, and remarks on the crowd and her husband. Her husband enters, noting that she has disobeyed his order to her not to enter the citadel. Their voices contrast in their duet, she tired of war, he exulting in it and saying how he plans to explode the fortress, taking all its occupants with it. Even so, the Commandant offers her the chance to flee, for her safety. Maria vows to stay at her husband's side.

A cannon shot sounds, apparently signaling an enemy attack. The sergeant hands the Commandant the fuse, but he will not use it, preferring combat. The next sound, however, is of distant bells, and other bells from the town join in. The sergeant then reports that the Holstein troops are approaching, but not to attack, rather decked with streamers, flowers and white flags. The Commandant thinks that this is a ruse. The Mayor and prelate, however, are overjoyed to see this procession, mistaking it for the Commandant's promised signal.

The Holstein commander then enters to seek the Commandant, and offers the news that the Thirty Years' War is over that very day, as an armistice has been signed. The Commandant is harsh in his acknowledgement of the Holstein commander, and insults him to the point where he draws his sword. The Holstein commander reaches for his own sword, but does not draw it. Maria then throws herself between the two military commanders, pleading for peace between them. Suddenly, the Commandant and the Holstein commander embrace. The opera concludes with a chorus of reconciliation.

== The politics of Friedenstag ==
A work extolling the union of peoples.
This work in which I put the best of myself.
Richard Strauss in letters to friends.

Strauss rarely got involved in political matters: in 1914 he had refused to join the war-hysteria and did not sign up to the Manifesto of German Artists in support of the war effort, declaring that "Declarations about war and politics are not fitting for an artist, who must give his attention to his creations and his works". However, with Friedenstag, he made an exception, perhaps out of loyalty to Zweig, or perhaps due to his growing dislike of the Nazi regime. Both Zweig and Strauss shared a common opposition to the militarism and anti-Semitism of the Nazis. Musicologist Pamela Potter argues that Zweig and Strauss constructed an opera whose surface aesthetic was acceptable to the Nazis, but had within it a clear pacifist and humanist message. It was an opera dealing with German history (the end of the thirty years war in 1648), with the central character of a commandant who appealed to the Nazi ideal of the loyal and dedicated soldier. "The message of peace thus shone through the masquerade of a National Socialist work." Foreign reviewers were able to see more clearly the essentially pacifist and humanitarian nature of the work.

The pacifist perspective is put into the mouths of the Mayor and townspeople who come to beg the commander to surrender. The townspeople express the hopelessness and desolation of war:

Tell him what war is,
The murderer of my children!
And my children are dead,
And the old folk whimper for food.
In the wreck of our houses
We must go hunting Foul rats to feed us.

The Mayor likewise:

Whom do you hope to defeat?
I've seen the enemy, they're men like us
they're suffering out there in their
trenches, just as we are.
When they tread they groan like us –
and when they pray, they pray like us to God!

Zweig's skill as a librettist is shown by his having the soldiers describe the approaching "rabble" of townspeople using the Nazi terminology used to denigrate Jews such as "rats" and "enemy within":

There's a few grey rats swarming.
Two thousand, three thousand, storming the gate!
From the town!
The enemy? Trouble.
The enemy within. Arm yourselves!
Who wastes powder on rats?

The opera was performed many times in Germany, Austria and Italy and its popularity stemmed from the fact that it allowed people to openly express the preference for peace over war in a politically acceptable and safe way. Performances were only halted after war was well under way. Strauss himself was surprised at the acceptance of the opera by the Nazis. He wrote "I fear that this work in which I put the best of myself will not be performed much longer. Will the cataclysm which we all fear soon break out?" Part of the reason the Nazis were willing to allow its performance was no doubt to reinforce the image their propaganda was seeking to promote that Germany did not want war. The premier was just after the Anschluss when Austria was annexed by Germany and a few weeks before the signing of the Munich Agreement between Germany, Britain, France and Italy, hailed as "peace in our time" by the British Prime Minister Neville Chamberlain. Adolf Hitler and many leading Nazi figures attended the opera in June 1939 in Vienna, when plans for the invasion of Poland a few months later would have been well under way.

Friedenstag was premiered a few months before the Kristallnacht atrocities on 9–10 November 1938. On November 15, Strauss rushed back from Italy to Garmisch because his wife Pauline had telegraphed him to return because his Jewish daughter-in-law Alice was under house arrest. Strauss managed to obtain her release, but from then on the position of Alice and grandchildren Christian and Richard became perilous. In December 1941, Strauss moved to Vienna, where the Nazi governor Baldur von Schirach was an admirer of Strauss and offered some protection. Strauss was to experience at close quarters what was happening to Alice's family. In 1942, Strauss became involved in the attempts of his son Franz to get Jewish relatives out to Switzerland, including an ill-fated visit to the concentration camp at Theresienstadt. Many of Alice's relatives were murdered in the holocaust. Son Franz and Alice were put under house arrest in Vienna in 1943. The position of Alice and her children was never without fear. Zweig's books had been banned and burned soon after the Nazis came to power and he spent most of his time in London. On the verge of becoming a permanent resident, with the outbreak of war he suddenly became an enemy alien and had to give up his dream of living in Britain. He moved to the US and then Brazil. Depressed by the growth of intolerance, authoritarianism, and Nazism, feeling hopeless for the future for humanity, he committed suicide with his wife on 23 February 1942.

== Recordings ==
Year	Cast: Kommandant, Maria, Wachtmeister, Konstabel	Conductor, Opera house and orchestra	Label
1939	Hans Hotter, Viorica Ursuleac, Herbert Alsen, Hermann Wiedemann	Clemens Krauss, Vienna State Opera Orchestra and Chorus ( Recording of a performance at the Vienna State Opera, 10 June)	CD: Koch-Schwann; Cat: 3-1465-2
1988	Bernd Weikl, Sabine Hass, Jaako Ryhänen, Jan-Hendrik Rootering	Wolfgang Sawallisch, Bavarian Radio Symphony Orchestra, Chorus of the Bavarian State Opera and the Bavarian Radio Choir	CD: EMI; Cat: CDC 5 56850-2
1989	Roger Roloff, Alessandra Marc, William Wilderman, Max Wittges	Robert Bass, Collegiate Chorale and Orchestra; New York City Gay Men's Chorus (Recording of a concert performance in Carnegie Hall,19 November)	CD: Koch International Classics; Cat: 37111-2
1999	Albert Dohmen, Deborah Voigt, Alfred Reiter, Tom Martinsen	Giuseppe Sinopoli, Staatskapelle Dresden and the Dresden State Opera Chorus	CD: DG; Cat: 463 494-2
