= Vinson Cole =

American tenor (born 1950)

Vinson Cole (born November 21, 1950) is an American operatic tenor.

== Early life ==
A native of Kansas City, the tenor studied at the Conservatory of Music and Dance at the University of Missouri-Kansas City; the Philadelphia Musical Academy; and at the Curtis Institute of Music with Margaret Harshaw.

== Singing career ==
He made his European debut in Angers, France in Handel's Acis and Galatea and followed that with the role of Belmonte in Mozart's Abduction from the Seraglio with the Welsh National Opera. In 1977, his youthful promise was recognized when he won the Metropolitan Opera Auditions, the WGN Competition, and was awarded both Rockefeller Foundation and National Opera Institute grants.

As his career unfolded, he went on to sing leading roles in many major opera houses including the Metropolitan Opera, San Francisco Opera, Opéra National de Paris and Paris Opera-Bastille, Teatro alla Scala, and the theatres in Berlin, Vienna, and Hamburg. For nine years, he sang at the Salzburg Festival. In the United States, he has sung with the New York City, Seattle, Houston, Santa Fe, and St. Louis opera companies.

In 1997, he returned to open the season at La Scala as Renaud in Gluck's Armide with Riccardo Muti conducting. He made his Chicago Lyric Opera debut in the title role of Mozart's Idomeneo in 1998 and his debut with the Royal Opera at Covent Garden in 1999 in another Mozart title role, La Clemenza di Tito. In the 2001 season, he returned to the Met as Alfredo in La traviata opposite the Violetta of June Anderson.

Cole is closely identified with the French repertory. He began moving in that direction in 1984, after he sang in the Manon centennial performances at Paris's Opéra Comique. Not long afterward, he sang the tenor version of Gluck's Orphée in Seattle, after which many other French works came his way: Lakmé, Werther, Carmen, Don Carlos, Faust, and La damnation de Faust.

Cole has sung extensively with orchestras throughout his career and has worked with many of the world's leading conductors including Herbert von Karajan, Sir Georg Solti (with whom he recorded the Mozart Requiem on the 200th anniversary of the composer's death), Seiji Ozawa, Sir Simon Rattle, Kurt Masur, James Levine, Edo de Waart, Charles Dutoit, Michael Tilson Thomas, Gerard Schwarz, Andrew Davis, Zubin Mehta, Riccardo Muti, Carlo Maria Giulini, Vladimir Ashkenazy, Claudio Abbado, and Daniel Barenboim.

== Teaching ==
Cole has taught at the University of Washington School of Music, the New England Conservatory of Music and at the Aspen Music Festival and School. He has also conducted masterclasses for the San Francisco Opera's Merola Program and the Canadian Opera Company. He is currently a faculty member at the Curtis Institute of Music, Conservatory of Music and Dance at UMKC and the Cleveland Institute of Music. Mr. Cole resides in Mission, Kansas, a suburb of Kansas City.
