= List of compositions by Alexander von Zemlinsky =

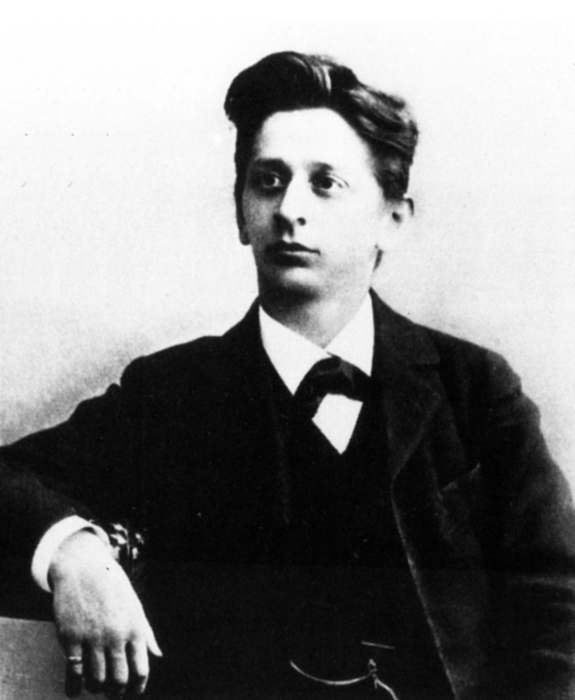
Alexander Zemlinsky

The following is a complete list of compositions by Alexander von Zemlinsky.

== Works sorted by opus number ==
=== Works with opus number ===
- Op. 1, Ländliche Tänze (c. 1891)
- Op. 2, Lieder für Singstimme und Klavier (1895–96)
- Op. 3, Trio for clarinet (or violin), violoncello and piano in D minor (1896)
- Op. 4, String Quartet No.1 in A major (1896)
- Op. 5, Gesänge für Singstimme und Klavier (1896–97)
- Op. 6, Walzer-Gesänge nach toskanischen Volksliedern (1898)
- Op. 7, Irmelin Rose und andere Gesänge (c. 1898–99)
- Op. 8, Turmwächterlied und andere Gesänge (1898–99)
- Op. 9, Fantasien über Gedichte von Richard Dehmel (1898)
- Op. 10, Ehetanzlied und andere Gesänge (1899–1901)
- Op. 11, Der Traumgörge (1904–06)
- Op. 12, Kleider machen Leute (1907–09)
- Op. 13, Six Songs to texts by Maurice Maeterlinck (1910/13)
- Op. 14, Psalm 23 (1910)
- Op. 15, String Quartet No.2 (1913–15)
- Op. 16, Eine florentinische Tragödie (1915–16)
- Op. 17, Der Zwerg (1919–21)
- Op. 18, Lyric Symphony (1922–23)
- Op. 19, String Quartet No.3 (1924)
- Op. 20, Symphonische Gesänge for baritone or alto and orchestra (1929)
- Op. 21, Der Kreidekreis (1930–31)
- Op. 22, Sechs Lieder für Singstimme und Klavier (1934)
- Op. 23, Sinfonietta (1934)
- Op. 24, Psalm 13 (1935)
- Op. 25, String Quartet No. 4 (Suite) (1936)
- Op. 26, Der König Kandaules (1935–36)
- Op. 27, 12 Lieder für Singstimme und Klavier (1937)

=== Works without opus number ===
Those works marked with an asterisk (*) are currently unavailable

- Seven Songs (1889–90)
- * Piano Sonata in C minor (1890)
- Drei Stücke für Violoncello und Klavier (1891)
- * Symphony in E minor (1891) — two surviving movements only
- * Drei leichte Stücke für Klavier (1891)
- * Terzet in A major for two violins and viola (1892)
- Symphony No. 1 in D minor (1892)
- 4 Ballads for piano (1892–93)
- * Piano Quartet in D major (1893) — partially lost
- String Quartet in E minor (c.1893)
- Cello Sonata (1894)
- Two Movements for String Quintet (1894–96) — surviving movements of the String Quintet in D minor
- Lustspielouvertüre (1894–95)
- Sarema (1893–95)
- Orchestersuite (1895)
- Albumblatt (Erinnerung aus Wien) for piano (1895)
- Minnelied for male chorus and chamber ensemble (c.1895)
- Waldgespräch for soprano, two horns, harp and strings (1895)
- Five Songs (1895–96)
- Skizze for piano (1896)
- Hochzeitgesang for tenor solo, chorus and organ (1896)
- Frühlingsglaube for mixed chorus and string orchestra (1896)
- Geheimnis for mixed chorus and string orchestra (1896)
- Serenade (Suite) for violin and piano (1896)
- Frühlingsbegräbnis for soprano, baritone, mixed chorus and orchestra (1896/97, rev. c.1903)
- Symphony No. 2 in B♭ major (1897)
- Es war einmal (1897–99)
- Aurikelchen for female chorus (1898)
- Maiblumen blühten überall for soprano and string sextet (1899)
- * Fridl, singspiel for solo voices and piano (c.1900) — partially lost
- Psalm 83 (1900)
- Erdeinsamkeit (1900–01)
- Der alte Garten (1900–01)
- Der Triumph der Zeit, ballet in three acts (1900–04)
  - Menuett (from Das gläserne Herz) for piano (1901)
  - Drei Ballettstücke (1902)
  - Ein Tanzpoem (1904)
- Two Brettl-Lieder (1901)
- Ein Lichtstrahl, mimedrama for piano (1901)
- Die Seejungfrau (The Little Mermaid), after Hans Christian Andersen (1902–03)
- Four Songs (1903–5)
- Arrangement of Mahler's Symphonie No. 6 for piano four-hands (1906)
- Two Ballads for baritone and piano (1907)
- Five Songs to texts by Richard Dehmel for voice and piano (1907)
- Malwa (1912) — unfinished; fragment realised and orchestrated by Antony Beaumont (2021)
- Incidental music for Shakespeare's Cymbeline (1913–15) — originally op. 14
- Four Songs for voice and piano (1916)
- Two Movements for string quartet (1927) — completed movements of abandoned quartet, originally intended as No.4
- Und einmal gehst du (1933)
- Das bucklichte Männlein (1934)
- Ahnung Beatricens (1935)
- Quartet for clarinet, violin, viola and cello (1938/39) — unfinished
- Three Songs (1939–40)
- Humoreske (Rondo) for wind quintet (1939)
- Hunting Piece (Jagdstück) for two horns and piano (1939)

== Works sorted by type of composition ==
=== Operas ===
| Opus | Title | Genre | Subdivisions | Libretto | Composition | Première date | Place, theatre |
|---|---|---|---|---|---|---|---|
| | Sarema | | 3 parts | the composer, Adolf von Zemlinsky and Arnold Schoenberg | 1893–95 | 10 October 1897 | Munich, Hofoper |
| | Es war einmal | | prologue and 3 acts | Maximilian Singer after Holger Drachmann | 1897–99, rev.1912 | 22 January 1900 | Vienna, Hofoper |
| 11 | Der Traumgörge | | 2 acts and a postlude | Leo Feld | 1904–06 | 11 October 1980 | Nuremberg, Opernhaus |
| 12 | Kleider machen Leute | musikalische Komödie | prologue and 3 acts | Leo Feld, after Gottfried Keller | 1907–1909, revised in 1910 and 1922 | 2 December 1910 | Vienna, Volksoper |
| 16 | Eine florentinische Tragödie | | 1 act | Oscar Wilde's A Florentine Tragedy, translated by Max Meyerfeld | 1915–16 | 30 January 1917 | Stuttgart, Hoftheater |
| 17 | Der Zwerg | | 1 act | Georg C. Klaren based on Oscar Wilde's The Birthday of the Infanta | 1919–21 | 28 May 1922 | Cologne, Neues Theater |
| 21 | Der Kreidekreis | | 3 acts | the composer after Klabund | 1930–31 | 14 October 1933 | Zurich, Stadttheater |
| 26 | Der König Kandaules | | 3 acts | the composer after André Gide's Le roi Candaule in the German translation by Franz Blei | 1935–36, orchestration completed by Antony Beaumont (1992–96) | 6 October 1996 | Hamburg, State Opera |

=== Other stage works ===
- Ein Lichtstrahl (A Ray of Light). Mime drama for piano (scenario by Oskar Geller, 1901, rev. 1902)
- Ein Tanzpoem. A Dance Poem in one act for orchestra (Hugo von Hofmannsthal (1901–04, final version of the ballet Der Triumph der Zeit)
- Incidental music for Shakespeare's Cymbeline for tenor, reciters and orchestra (1913–15)

=== Choral works ===
- Minnelied (T: Heinrich Heine) for men's choir and chamber ensemble (c.1895)
- Frühlingsglaube for mixed chorus and string orchestra (T: Ludwig Uhland) (1896)
- Geheimnis for mixed chorus and string orchestra (1896)
- Hochzeitsgesang (T: Jewish liturgy) for Cantor (Tenor), chorus, and organ (1896) Text: Baruch Haba, Mi Adir
- Frühlingsbegräbnis (Text: Paul Heyse). Cantata for soprano, baritone, mixed chorus and orchestra (1896/97, rev. c.1903)
- Aurikelchen (T: Richard Dehmel) for women's choir (1898)
- Psalm 83 for mixed chorus and orchestra (1900)
- Psalm 23 for chorus and orchestra, Op. 14 (1910, first performance, Vienna 1910)
- Psalm 13 for chorus and orchestra, Op. 24 (1935)

=== Voice and orchestra ===
- Waldgespräch (T: Joseph von Eichendorff) for soprano, two horns, harp and strings (1896)
- Maiblumen blühten überall (T: Richard Dehmel) for soprano and string sextet (1899)
- Erdeinsamkeit (1900–01) (T: unknown) – orchestrated by Antony Beaumont (1999)
- Der alte Garten (1900–01) (T: Eichendorff) – orchestrated by Antony Beaumont (1999)
- Sechs Gesänge after poems by Maurice Maeterlinck, Op. 13 (1910/13, orchestrated 1913/21)
- Lyric Symphony for soprano, baritone and orchestra, Op. 18 (after poems by Rabindranath Tagore) (1922–23)
- Symphonische Gesänge Op. 20 for baritone or alto and orchestra (T: from Afrika singt. Eine Auslese neuer afro-amerikanischer Lyrik) (1929)

=== Songs for voice and piano ===
- Seven Songs (1889–90)
- Five Songs (1895–96)
- Lieder, Op. 2 (2 volumes, 1895–96)
- Gesänge, Op. 5 (2 volumes, 1896–97)
- Walzer-Gesänge nach toskanischen Liedern von Ferdinand Gregorovius, Op. 6 (1898)
- Irmelin Rose und andere Gesänge, Op. 7 (1898/99)
- Turmwächterlied und andere Gesänge, Op. 8 (1898/99)
- Ehetanzlied und andere Gesänge, Op. 10 (1899–1901)
- Two Brettl-Lieder (1901)
- Four Songs (1903–5)
- Two Ballads (1907)
- Five Songs to texts by Richard Dehmel (1907)
- Sechs Gesänge after poems by Maurice Maeterlinck, Op. 13 (1910/13)
- Four Songs (1916)
- Und einmal gehst du (1933)
- Sechs Lieder, Op. 22 (1934; first performance, Prague 1934)
- Das bucklichte Männlein (1934)
- Ahnung Beatricens (1935)
- Zwölf Lieder, Op. 27 (1937)
- Three Songs (T: Irma Stein-Firner) (1939)

=== Orchestral works ===
- Symphony in E minor (1891) – two surviving movements only
- Symphony No. 1 in D minor (1892–93)
- Eine Lustspielouvertüre (1894–95)
- Symphony No. 2 in B♭ major (1897)
- Drei Ballettstücke. Suite from Der Triumph der Zeit (1902)
- Die Seejungfrau (The Mermaid), fantasy after Hans Christian Andersen's "The Little Mermaid" (1902–03, premiered in Vienna in 1905)
- Sinfonietta, Op. 23 (1934, first performance, Prague 1935)

=== Chamber music ===
- Three Pieces for cello and piano (1891)
- String Quartet in E minor (c.1893)
- Sonata in A minor for cello and piano (1894)
- Two Movements for string quintet (1894/1896) – surviving movements of the String Quintet in D minor
- Serenade (Suite) for violin and piano (1895)
- Trio for clarinet (or violin), cello and piano in D minor, Op. 3 (1896)
- String Quartet No. 1 in A major, Op. 4 (1896)
- String Quartet No. 2, Op. 15 (1913–15, first performance, Vienna 1918)
- String Quartet No. 3, Op. 19 (1924)
- Two Movements for string quartet (1927) – completed movements of abandoned quartet, originally intended as No.4
- String Quartet No. 4 (Suite), Op. 25 (1936)
- Quartet for clarinet, violin, viola and cello (1938/39) – unfinished, fragments only
- Humoreske (Rondo) for wind quintet (1939)
- Jagdstück (Hunting Piece) for two horns and piano (1939)

=== Works for piano ===
- Ländliche Tanze, Op. 1 (1892)
- Vier Balladen (1892–93)
- Albumblatt (Erinnerung aus Wien) (1895)
- Skizze (1896)
- Fantasien über Gedichte von Richard Dehmel, Op. 9 (1898)
- Menuett (from Das gläserne Herz) (1901)

Principal publishers: Universal Edition, Ricordi Berlin, Simrock/Boosey & Hawkes

== See also ==
- Alexander von Zemlinsky.
