= Maiblumen blühten überall =

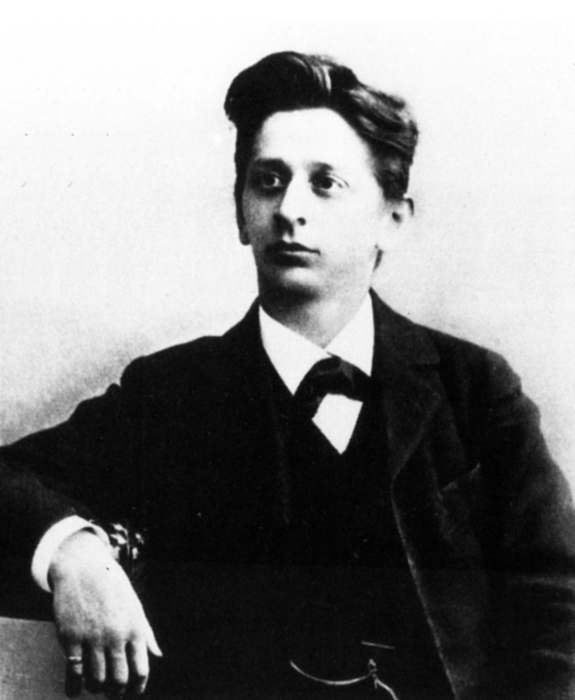
Alexander Zemlinsky c. 1900

Maiblumen blüten überall (Eng: Mayflowers blossomed everywhere) is a musical work for soprano voice and string sextet by Austrian composer Alexander Zemlinsky.

== Composition ==
The work sets the first two stanzas of Richard Dehmel’s poem Die Magd (The Maid). The autograph manuscript carries no date but the work has been dated by Zemlinsky scholar Antony Beaumont to 1899 since a sketch for it appears among the material for the Prelude to Es war einmal, also composed at this time. The title by which the work is now known was given on publication in 1997.

== Structure ==
The manuscript score suggests that Zemlinsky was originally planning to set the whole of Dehmel’s five-verse poem but, for reasons unknown, broke off and never returned to it. However, the works’ two main sections comprise what Beaumont calls “a thematically integrated unit” and form a satisfying whole in performance.

The performance duration is approximately 9 minutes.

== Scoring ==
Soprano voice, two violins, two violas and two cellos.
