= Psalm 83 =

Biblical Psalm

- "Keep not thou silence, O God"
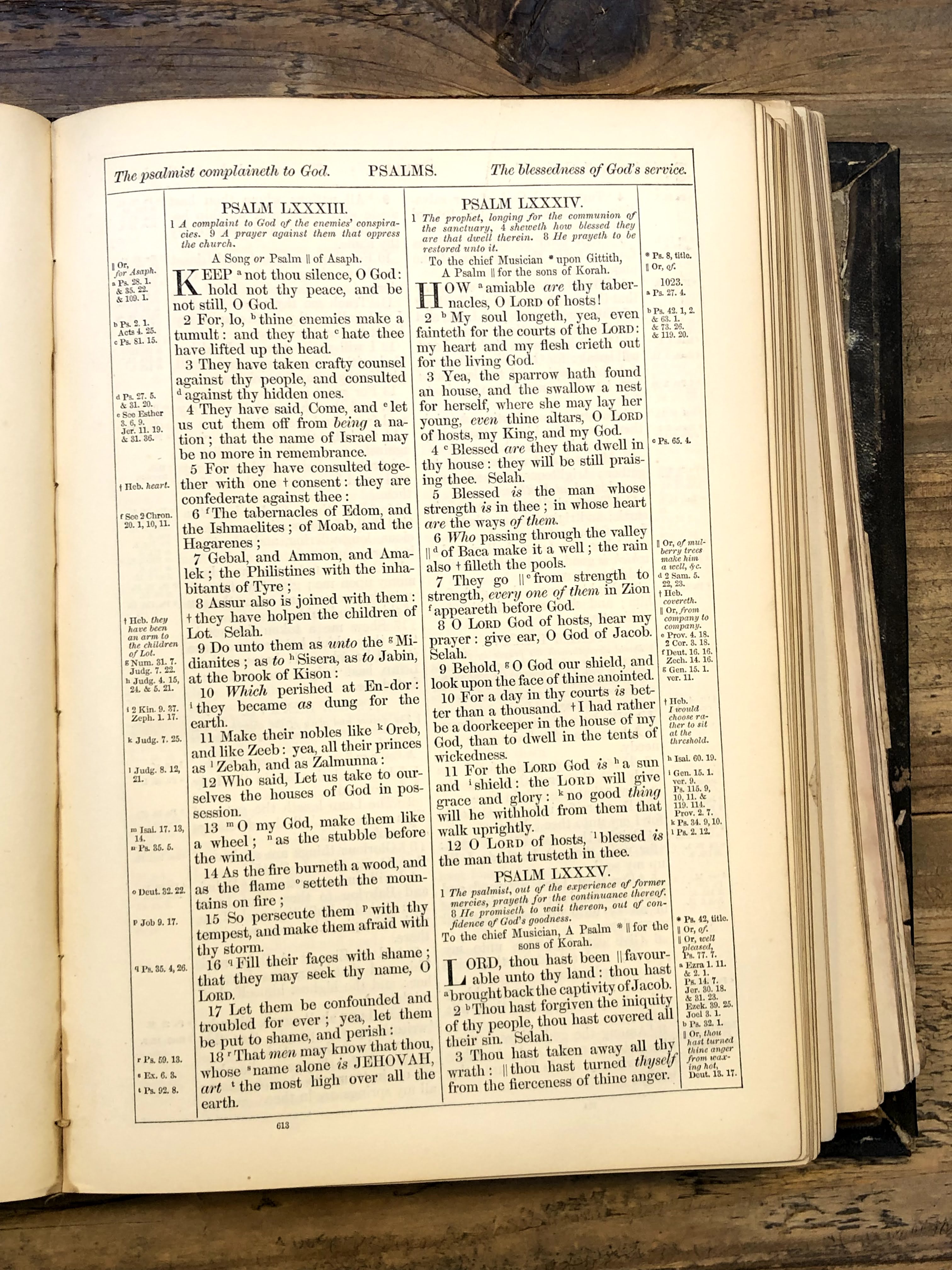
- Psalm 83 in the King James Bible
- Other name: Psalm 82; "Deus quis similis erit tibi ne taceas"
- Text: by Asaph
- Language: Hebrew (original)

Psalm 83
- ← Psalm 82 Psalm 84 →
- Book: Book of Psalms
- Hebrew Bible part: Ketuvim
- Order in the Hebrew part: 1
- Category: Sifrei Emet
- Christian Bible part: Old Testament
- Order in the Christian part: 19

Psalm 83 is the 83rd psalm of the Book of Psalms, beginning in English in the King James Version: "Keep not thou silence, O God". In the slightly different numbering system used in the Greek Septuagint and Latin Vulgate translations of the Bible, this psalm is Psalm 82. In Latin, it is known as "Deus quis similis erit tibi ne taceas". It is one of the 12 Psalms of Asaph. This psalm is the last of the Psalms of Asaph, which include Psalms 50 and 73 to 83. It is also the last of the "Elohist" collection, Psalms 42–83, in which the one of God's titles, Elohim, is mainly used. It is generally seen as a national lament provoked by the threat of an invasion of Israel by its neighbors.

The psalm forms a regular part of Jewish, Catholic, Lutheran, Anglican and other Protestant liturgies. It has been set to music, including works by Heinrich Schütz and Alexander von Zemlinsky.

== Analysis ==
Some have indicated that the specific naming of particular nations indicates that it does refer to a specific historical period, even though the prayer itself would be offered in the Temple in Jerusalem. The dating of its composition is debated, but the reference in verse 9 to Assyria is seen by many commentators as an indication that the Psalm was written during the time of Assyrian ascendancy, the 9th to 7th centuries BC. Others have placed the composition of the psalm from the time of Saul onwards, up to the age of the Maccabees, suggested by Theodore of Mopsuestia.

== Book of Common Prayer ==
In the Church of England's Book of Common Prayer, this psalm is appointed to be read in the evening of the 16th day of the month.

== Musical settings ==
Heinrich Schütz set Psalm 83 in a metred version in German, "Gott, schweig du nicht so ganz und gar", SWV 180, as part of the Becker Psalter, first published in 1628.

Alexander von Zemlinsky composed a setting for choir and orchestra, using selected verses in German, Psalm 83, in 1900.

== Text ==
The following table shows the Hebrew text of the Psalm with vowels, alongside the Koine Greek text in the Septuagint and the English translation from the King James Version. Note that the meaning can slightly differ between these versions, as the Septuagint and the Masoretic Text come from different textual traditions. (Note: A 1917 translation directly from Hebrew to English by the Jewish Publication Society can be found here or here, and an 1844 translation directly from the Septuagint by L. C. L. Brenton can be found here. Both translations are in the public domain.) In the Septuagint, this psalm is numbered Psalm 82.

#	Hebrew	English	Greek
(Note: In the Jewish verse numbering, the ascription of this psalm is verse 1, and the rest of the psalm begins from verse 2. However, the Christian verse numbering does not count the ascription.)	שִׁ֖יר מִזְמ֣וֹר לְאָסָֽף׃	(A Song or Psalm of Asaph.)	᾿ῼδὴ ψαλμοῦ τῷ ᾿Ασάφ. -
1	אֱלֹהִ֥ים אַל־דֳּמִי־לָ֑ךְ אַל־תֶּחֱרַ֖שׁ וְאַל־תִּשְׁקֹ֣ט אֵֽל׃	Keep not thou silence, O God: hold not thy peace, and be not still, O God.	Ο ΘΕΟΣ, τίς ὁμοιωθήσεταί σοι; μὴ σιγήσῃς μηδὲ καταπραΰνῃς, ὁ Θεός·
2	כִּֽי־הִנֵּ֣ה א֭וֹיְבֶיךָ יֶהֱמָי֑וּן וּ֝מְשַׂנְאֶ֗יךָ נָ֣שְׂאוּ רֹֽאשׁ׃	For, lo, thine enemies make a tumult: and they that hate thee have lifted up the head.	ὅτι ἰδοὺ οἱ ἐχθροί σου ἤχησαν, καὶ οἱ μισοῦντές σε ᾖραν κεφαλήν,
3	עַֽל־עַ֭מְּךָ יַעֲרִ֣ימוּ ס֑וֹד וְ֝יִתְיָעֲצ֗וּ עַל־צְפוּנֶֽיךָ׃	They have taken crafty counsel against thy people, and consulted against thy hidden ones.	ἐπὶ τὸν λαόν σου κατεπανουργεύσαντο γνώμην καὶ ἐβουλεύσαντο κατὰ τῶν ἁγίων σου·
4	אָמְר֗וּ לְ֭כוּ וְנַכְחִידֵ֣ם מִגּ֑וֹי וְלֹֽא־יִזָּכֵ֖ר שֵֽׁם־יִשְׂרָאֵ֣ל עֽוֹד׃	They have said, Come, and let us cut them off from being a nation; that the name of Israel may be no more in remembrance.	εἶπαν· δεῦτε καὶ ἐξολοθρεύσωμεν αὐτοὺς ἐξ ἔθνους, καὶ οὐ μὴ μνησθῇ τὸ ὄνομα ᾿Ισραὴλ ἔτι.
5	כִּ֤י נוֹעֲצ֣וּ לֵ֣ב יַחְדָּ֑ו עָ֝לֶ֗יךָ בְּרִ֣ית יִכְרֹֽתוּ׃	For they have consulted together with one consent: they are confederate against thee:	ὅτι ἐβουλεύσαντο ἐν ὁμονοίᾳ ἐπὶ τὸ αὐτό, κατὰ σοῦ διαθήκην διέθεντο
6	אׇהֳלֵ֣י אֱ֭דוֹם וְיִשְׁמְעֵאלִ֗ים מוֹאָ֥ב וְהַגְרִֽים׃	The tabernacles of Edom, and the Ishmaelites; of Moab, and the Hagarenes;	τὰ σκηνώματα τῶν ᾿Ιδουμαίων καὶ οἱ ᾿Ισμαηλῖται, Μωὰβ καὶ οἱ ᾿Αγαρηνοί,
7	גְּבָ֣ל וְ֭עַמּוֹן וַעֲמָלֵ֑ק פְּ֝לֶ֗שֶׁת עִם־יֹ֥שְׁבֵי צֽוֹר׃	Gebal, and Ammon, and Amalek; the Philistines with the inhabitants of Tyre;	Γεβὰλ καὶ ᾿Αμμὼν καὶ ᾿Αμαλὴκ καὶ ἀλλόφυλοι μετὰ τῶν κατοικούντων Τύρον.
8	גַּם־אַ֭שּׁוּר נִלְוָ֣ה עִמָּ֑ם הָ֤יֽוּ זְר֖וֹעַ לִבְנֵי־ל֣וֹט סֶֽלָה׃	Assur also is joined with them: they have holpen the children of Lot. Selah.	καὶ γὰρ καὶ ᾿Ασσοὺρ συμπαρεγένετο μετ᾿ αὐτῶν, ἐγενήθησαν εἰς ἀντίληψιν τοῖς υἱοῖς Λώτ. (διάψαλμα).
9	עֲשֵֽׂה־לָהֶ֥ם כְּמִדְיָ֑ן כְּֽסִיסְרָ֥א כְ֝יָבִ֗ין בְּנַ֣חַל קִישֽׁוֹן׃	Do unto them as unto the Midianites; as to Sisera, as to Jabin, at the brook of Kison:	ποίησον αὐτοῖς ὡς τῇ Μαδιὰμ καὶ τῷ Σισάρᾳ, ὡς τῷ ᾿Ιαβεὶμ ἐν τῷ χειμάρρῳ Κεισών·
10	נִשְׁמְד֥וּ בְֽעֵין־דֹּ֑אר הָ֥יוּ דֹ֝֗מֶן לָאֲדָמָֽה׃	Which perished at En-dor: they became as dung for the earth.	ἐξωλοθρεύθησαν ἐν ᾿Αενδώρ, ἐγενήθησαν ὡσεὶ κόπρος τῇ γῇ.
11	שִׁיתֵ֣מוֹ נְ֭דִיבֵימוֹ כְּעֹרֵ֣ב וְכִזְאֵ֑ב וּֽכְזֶ֥בַח וּ֝כְצַלְמֻנָּ֗ע כׇּל־נְסִיכֵֽימוֹ׃	Make their nobles like Oreb, and like Zeeb: yea, all their princes as Zebah, and as Zalmunna:	θοῦ τοὺς ἄρχοντας αὐτῶν ὡς τὸν ᾿Ωρὴβ καὶ Ζὴβ καὶ Ζεβεὲ καὶ Σαλμανὰ πάντας τοὺς ἄρχοντας αὐτῶν,
12	אֲשֶׁ֣ר אָ֭מְרוּ נִ֣ירְשָׁה לָּ֑נוּ אֵ֝֗ת נְא֣וֹת אֱלֹהִֽים׃	Who said, Let us take to ourselves the houses of God in possession.	οἵτινες εἶπαν· Κληρονομήσωμεν ἑαυτοῖς τὸ ἁγιαστήριον τοῦ Θεοῦ.
13	אֱֽלֹהַ֗י שִׁיתֵ֥מוֹ כַגַּלְגַּ֑ל כְּ֝קַ֗שׁ לִפְנֵי־רֽוּחַ׃	O my God, make them like a wheel; as the stubble before the wind.	ὁ Θεός μου, θοῦ αὐτοὺς ὡς τροχόν, ὡς καλάμην κατὰ πρόσωπον ἀνέμου·
14	כְּאֵ֥שׁ תִּבְעַר־יָ֑עַר וּ֝כְלֶהָבָ֗ה תְּלַהֵ֥ט הָרִֽים׃	As the fire burneth a wood, and as the flame setteth the mountains on fire;	ὡσεὶ πῦρ, ὃ διαφλέξει δρυμόν, ὡσεὶ φλόξ, ἣ κατακαύσει ὄρη,
15	כֵּ֭ן תִּרְדְּפֵ֣ם בְּסַעֲרֶ֑ךָ וּבְסוּפָתְךָ֥ תְבַהֲלֵֽם׃	So persecute them with thy tempest, and make them afraid with thy storm.	οὕτως καταδιώξεις αὐτοὺς ἐν τῇ καταιγίδι σου, καὶ ἐν τῇ ὀργῇ σου συνταράξεις αὐτούς.
16	מַלֵּ֣א פְנֵיהֶ֣ם קָל֑וֹן וִיבַקְשׁ֖וּ שִׁמְךָ֣ יְהֹוָֽה׃	Fill their faces with shame; that they may seek thy name, O LORD.	πλήρωσον τὰ πρόσωπα αὐτῶν ἀτιμίας, καὶ ζητήσουσι τὸ ὄνομά σου, Κύριε.
17	יֵבֹ֖שׁוּ וְיִבָּהֲל֥וּ עֲדֵי־עַ֗ד וְֽיַחְפְּר֥וּ וְיֹאבֵֽדוּ׃	Let them be confounded and troubled for ever; yea, let them be put to shame, and perish:	αἰσχυνθήτωσαν καὶ ταραχθήτωσαν εἰς τὸν αἰῶνα τοῦ αἰῶνος καὶ ἐντραπήτωσαν καὶ ἀπολέσθωσαν
18	וְֽיֵדְע֗וּ כִּֽי־אַתָּ֬ה שִׁמְךָ֣ יְהֹוָ֣ה לְבַדֶּ֑ךָ עֶ֝לְי֗וֹן עַל־כׇּל־הָאָֽרֶץ׃	That men may know that thou, whose name alone is JEHOVAH, art the most high over all the earth.	καὶ γνώτωσαν ὅτι ὄνομά σοι Κύριος· σὺ μόνος ῞Υψιστος ἐπὶ πᾶσαν τὴν γῆν.

=== Verse 1 ===
Do not keep silent, O God!
Do not hold Your peace,
And do not be still, O God!

The specific meaning of this verse is disputed. The verb can be translated to refer to either speech ("be not silent") or motion ("be not inactive"). The fact that the verse requests the assistance of God three times emphasizes the urgency of the situation and of the people's prayer.

=== Verses 2–5 ===
In the text of the psalm, specifically verses 2 through 5, the speaker says that individuals who plot against the nation of Israel are inherently the enemies of God. He also ascribes to them the intention of the complete extinction of the people of Israel.

=== Verses 6–8 ===
These verses provide the names of the ten nations which have evidently formed a coalition against Israel, the Edomites, the Ishmaelites, Moab, the Hagrites, Gebal, Ammon, Amalek, the Philistines, Tyre, and Assyria.

=== Verses 9–12 ===
The narrator goes on to assume that God himself will fight on Israel's side in the upcoming battle, based on the stories contained in the 4th through 8th chapters of the Book of Judges, citing individual actions attributed to God in that book.

=== Verses 13–17 ===
In these verses, the narrator specifically requests that God make the opponents of Israel suffer and experience shame and die in disgrace for opposing Israel, and, by extension, God himself. The specifics mentioned, including chaff, fire and storm, are references to the Sirocco.

=== Verse 18 ===
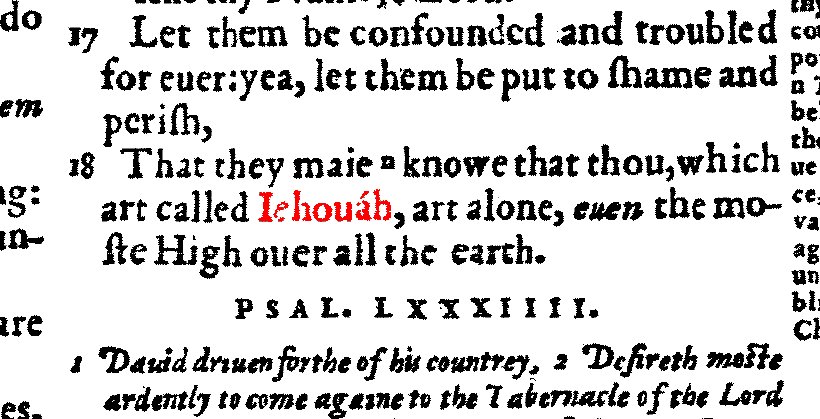
Psalm 83:18 – The Geneva Bible (1560): God's name Iehouah (in older Latin transcription form), that is Jehovah.

In this verse, the narrator states that he wishes God perform these various acts so that all might know that God is the most powerful entity and has sway over all the Earth. This verse, with verse 16, indicates that, although the bulk of the psalm is a prayer for the destruction of the enemies of Israel, there is some positive hope that the enemies of Israel might come to acknowledge the god of Israel. While the King James Version most often translates the tetragrammaton-YHWH (which occurs in the Hebrew scriptures 6,828 times) as "LORD", this verse has one of the several occurrences in which it is translated as "JEHOVAH". This translation renders those four letters, known as the Tetragrammaton, "Jehovah". That name is by far the most frequently occurring name in the Bible. It is one of the few verses where the phrases "whose name is" or "that is my name" are used (Isa 42:8, Jer 33:2, etc.) in the whole Bible. Notably, for these reasons this particular verse in the King James Bible is widely quoted, particularly by Jehovah's Witnesses, as evidence that "Jehovah" is the personal name of God.

Different translations interpret the verse as follows:

Translation	Psalm 83:18
ASV	"That they may know that thou alone, whose name is JEHOVAH, Art the Most High over all the earth."
KJV	"That men may know that thou, whose name alone is JEHOVAH, art the most high over all the earth."
NKJV	"That they may know that You, whose name alone is the Lord, Are the Most High over all the earth."
NAB	"Show them you alone are the LORD, the Most High over all the earth." (as verse 19)
NWT	"May people know that you, whose name is Jehovah, You alone are the Most High over all the earth."
REB	"So let it be known that you, whose name is the LORD, are alone Most High over all the earth."
RSV	"Let them know that thou alone, whose name is the LORD, art the Most High over all the earth."
WEB	"that they may know that you alone, whose name is YAHWEH, are the Most High over all the earth."
YLT	"And they know that Thou – (Thy name [is] JEHOVAH – by Thyself,) [Art] the Most High over all the earth!"

== See also ==
- Ezekiel 38 and 39, a passage that describes a similar war
- List of bible names beginning with "Jeho"
