= Turandot Suite =

- Orchestral suite by Ferruccio Busoni
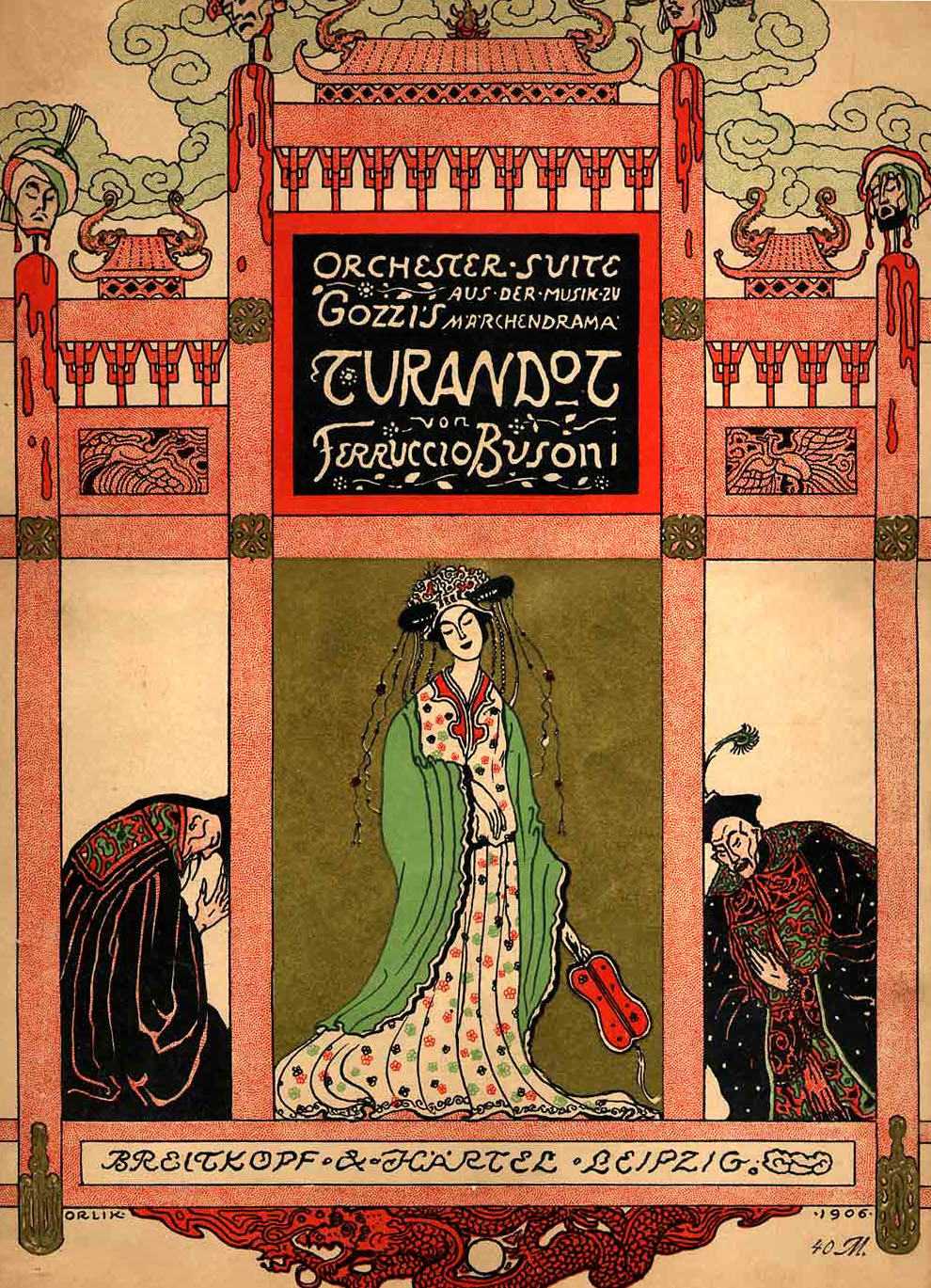
- Cover to the score, designed by Emil Orlík, and first published in 1906
- Catalogue: BV 248
- Opus: 41
- Composed: 1904–05
- Performed: October 21, 1905, Berlin
- Published: 1906
- Scoring: orchestra

The Turandot Suite, Op. 41 (BV 248) is an orchestral work by Ferruccio Busoni written in 1904–5, based on Count Carlo Gozzi's play Turandot. The music – in one form or another – occupied Busoni at various times between the years 1904–17. Busoni arranged the suite from incidental music which he was composing to accompany a production of Gozzi's play. The suite was first performed on 21 October 1905, while the play with his incidental music was not produced until 1911. In August 1916 Busoni had finished composing the one-act opera Arlecchino, but it needed a companion work to provide a full evening's entertainment. He suddenly decided to transform the Turandot music into a two-act opera with spoken dialog. The two works were premiered together as a double-bill in May 1917.

== Original titles of the suite and its movements ==
The original German title [with its English translation] is:

Orchestersuite aus der Musik zu Gozzis Märchendrama "Turandot"
[Orchestral Suite from the Music to Gozzi's Fairy Tale Drama "Turandot"]

The titles of the eight movements as published in 1906 are:

1. Die Hinrichtung, das Stadttor, der Abschied aus der Musik zum ersten Akt.
  (The Execution, the City Gate and the Departure from the music for the first act.)
2. Truffaldino. (Introduzione e marcia grotesca.)
  (Truffaldino. [Introduction and Grotesque March.])
3. Altoum. Marsch.
  (Altoum's March)
4. "Turandot" Marsch.
  (Turandot's March.)
5. Das Frauengemach. Einleitung zum III. Akt.
  (Zenana. Introduction to the third act.)
6. Tanz und Gesang.
  (Dance and Song.)
7. "Nächtlicher Walzer" aus der Musik zum vierten Akt.
  (Night Waltz from the music for the fourth act.)
8. "In modo di Marcia funebre" e "Finale alla Turca" aus der Musik zum fünften Akt.
  ("In the Manner of a Funeral March" and "Turkish Finale" from the music for the fifth act.)

In 1911 Busoni composed Verzweiflung und Ergebung ("Despair and Resignation", BV 248a) as an additional movement to be played between nos. VII and VIII. Even later, after completing the opera Turandot in 1917, he replaced the Funeral March of No. VIII with Altoums Warnung ("Altoum's Warning", BV 248b). The musicologist and Busoni scholar Antony Beaumont has stated that the final version of the suite, including both of these later additions, is the "definitive" version.

== Instrumentation ==
3 flutes (3rd doubling piccolo), 3 oboes (3rd doubling English horn), 3 clarinets (3rd doubling bass clarinet), 3 bassoons (3rd doubling contrabassoon); 4 horns, 4 trumpets, 3 trombones, 1 tuba; timpani, percussion (glockenspiel, triangle, tambourine, covered drum, bass drum, tam-tam); 2 harps; chorus: female (unison) ad lib.; strings. BV 248a and b instrumentation: as for BV 248 except without chorus.

== Choice of Gozzi's Turandot ==
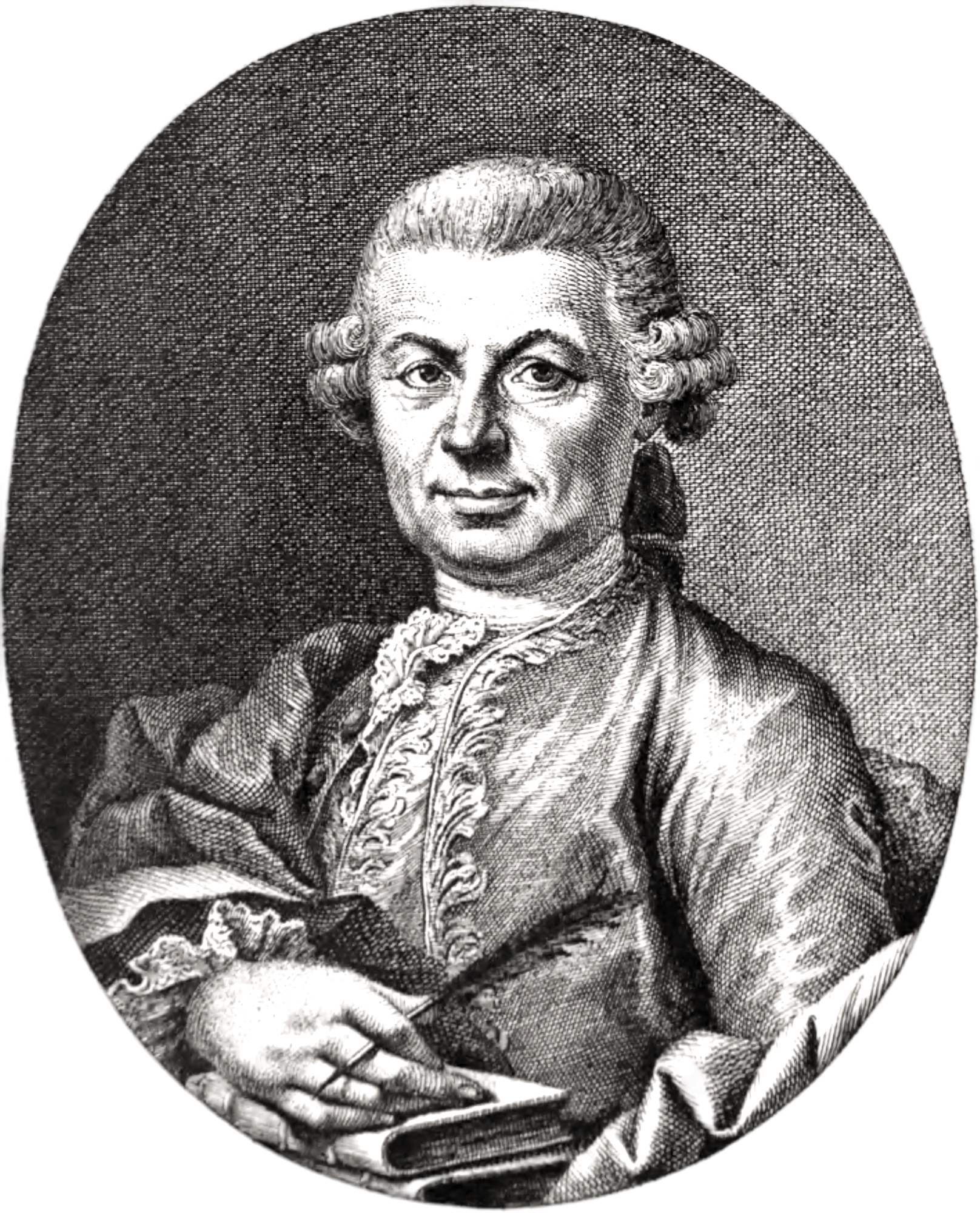
Carlo Gozzi (1720–1806)

Antony Beaumont has suggested that Busoni's decision to compose incidental music for Carlo Gozzi's play may have been prompted by the impending centennial (in 1906) of the playwright's death. Gozzi's Turandot, which first appeared in 1762, is the most well-known of his ten fiabe (fairy tales) written between 1761 and 1765. The action takes place outside a city gate of Peking and inside the Emperor's palace. Turandot, is a proud, cruel Chinese princess who refuses to marry any suitors unless they can answer three impossible riddles. When they fail, she has them executed. But Calaf, Prince of Astrakhan, manages to woo her ("Turandot or death!"), answers the riddles, and wins her hand in marriage. The play was originally written to be performed in the small theatre of San Samuele in Venice, and was deliberately written in the commedia dell'arte style as a reaction to the more modern, realistic plays of his rival Goldoni.

Busoni was very fond of fantastical and magical tales: his immediately preceding work was the Piano Concerto Op. 39 BV 247, which included music from an unfinished adaptation of Adam Oehlenschläger's Aladdin.

== Composition of the Turandot music ==
Busoni prepared some sketches of incidental music for Gozzi's Chinese fable as early as 1904, but did not apply himself exclusively to the task until the summer of 1905, when he remained alone in Berlin, while his wife Gerda and the children were away in Godinne, Belgium. During this period of concentrated work, from June to the middle of August, he went more or less chronologically through the play, composing music for those places where Gozzi explicitly called for it and also wherever his theatrical instincts suggested it could enhance the drama.

The themes and melodies Busoni chose for the Turandot music were based solely on oriental motifs of Chinese, but also Persian, Turkish, and Indian origin. He used as his source a book by the distinguished music critic and historian August Ambros, who had championed Busoni as a child prodigy. Beaumont shows how almost all the thematic material in the Turandot music is drawn from Volume I of Ambros' Geschichte der Musik.

In all, there are 34 manuscript sheets of sketches and orchestrations for the Turandot music in the Busoni Archive. He sketched out thirteen numbers for the play and orchestrated them almost immediately. Realising that a production of the play with his music was going to be difficult, time-consuming, and expensive to mount, he also arranged the music into a concert suite of eight movements, the Turandot Suite. Some of the music in the manuscripts is also designed for melodramas to be used with the play: each of the three riddles is preceded by enigmatic brass chords; initially Kalaf's replies were meant to be sung, although Busoni eventually dropped this idea.

In a letter to his mother dated 21 August 1905, Busoni wrote:

I have remained in Berlin all the time and have, as always, been very busy. On this occasion with a new score which I completed the day before yesterday. Babbo [Daddy] will be pleased to hear that I have made a new attempt at a theatre work, but in an unconventional way; not with an opera but with descriptive music for a spoken drama.

The play I have chosen for this purpose is an old dramatized fairy tale, a tragicomedy by our own Carlo Gozzi. Nothing would be more natural than to attempt to put on a play by an Italian writer which has by now become a classic (and yet, because it has been forgotten, remains a novelty), but unfortunately the state of affairs in our country gives no cause for hope.

For the production one would require not only an élite theatrical company but also great opulence and excellent taste in the design of costumes and scenery and, furthermore, a first rate orchestra. Gozzi is the author of fairy tales which mamma's grandmother used to tell her. L'amore delle tre melarance [The Love of Three Oranges], L'augellin Belverde [The Green Bird] and others were greatly in vogue in rococo times, but then they vanished without trace. I have chosen the tale of the cruel, seductive Chinese princess (or Persian, who knows) Turandot, who demands of her suitors the solutions of three riddles, at the risk of their losing their heads if they fail. As well as the heroic and oriental characters, the old Venetion masks also appear in comic roles: Pantalone, Brighella and Truffaldino.

The task absorbed me completely for two and a half months, during which I was unable to concentrate on anything else. Now it is finished and I must attend to other interests and endeavours.

== Performance history of the suite ==
Before he had even finished composing the Turandot music, Busoni was arranging for a concert performance of the suite. On 10 July 1905 he wrote to Egon Petri about a concert he was to conduct in Amsterdam which was to include not only the Piano Concerto with Petri as soloist, but also a performance of the Turandot Suite:

Mengelberg has been here [Berlin] and a plan has been drawn up for me to conduct my 'Concerto' (everyone stubbornly retains the final o) in Amsterdam, and for you to play it. I had been engaged as piano-player for the concert – when M. suddenly received an invitation to America.

The programme would be
1) Concerto
Interval
2) [Liszt's] Concerto pathétique for 2 pianos
(you and I)
3) Suite from the music to 'Turandot'

This twice on succeeding days, probably at the end of October.
Before I finalize, scribble your assent.

The financial outlook is poor – they only want to pay for a head-waiter – who is then supposed to tip the kitchen boy out of his own pocket.
Should the idea appeal to you, I can offer you one third, which amounts to 200 fl.

In the event, the first performance of the completed Turandot Suite took place at the Beethovensaal, Berlin on 21 October 1905, with Busoni conducting the Berlin Philharmonic Orchestra. The concert also included the German premiere of Hector Berlioz's Les nuits d'été.

Gustav Mahler conducted Busoni's Turandot Suite with the New York Philharmonic in two concerts at Carnegie Hall on 10 and 11 March 1910.

Busoni also conducted the Suite in Berlin on 13 Jan 1921, at one of a series of concerts of his own music organised by the musical periodical Der Anbruch.

== Turandot as incidental music ==
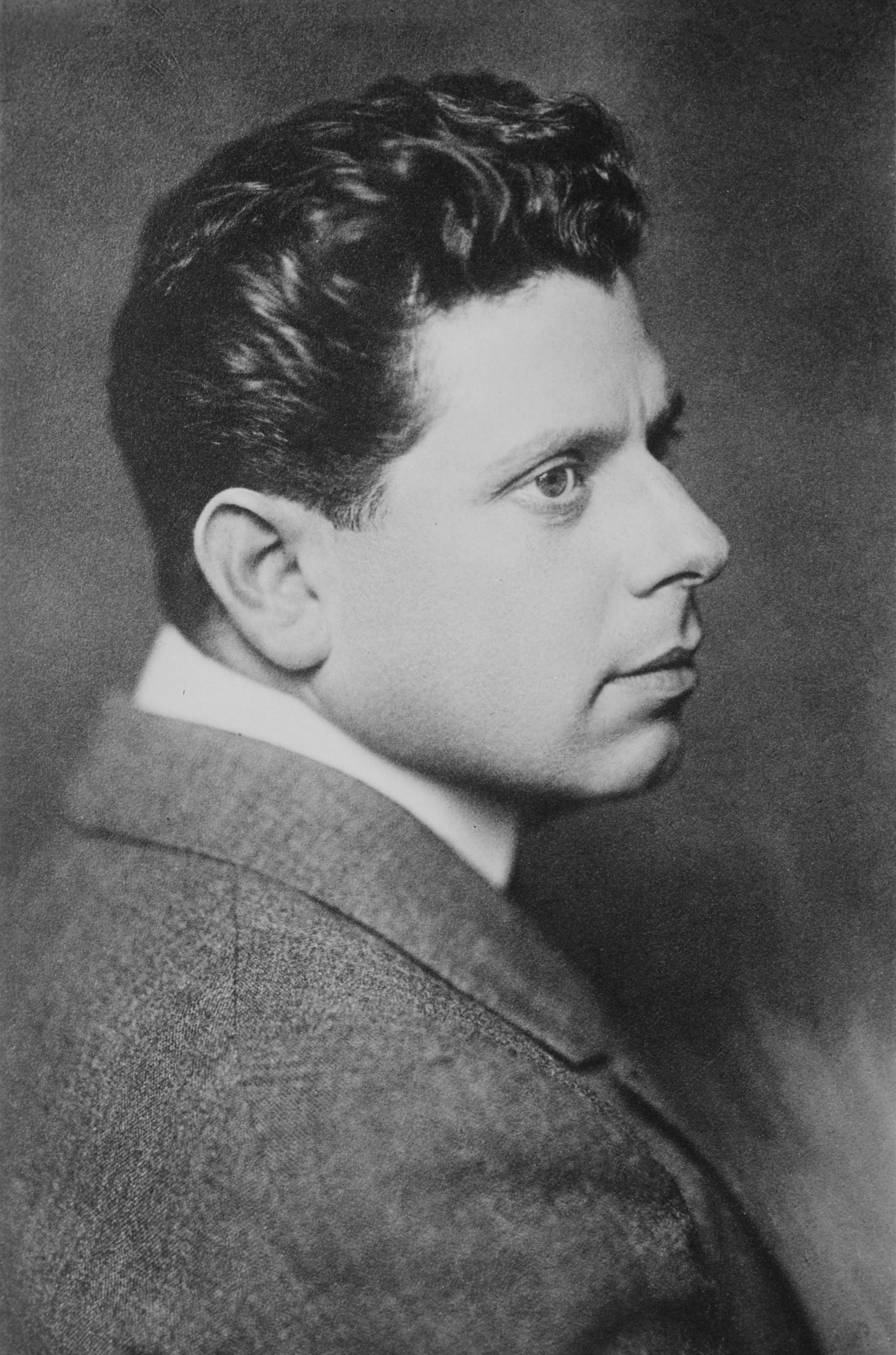
Max Reinhardt in 1911

=== Berlin production ===
Busoni was keen to have the incidental music performed along with Gozzi's play as he had originally conceived, and by early October 1906 at the latest had approached the actor-director Max Reinhardt about a production. Reinhardt accepted, and a performance was scheduled for 1907. Busoni also tried to get a production started in London, but was initially unsuccessful. He wrote to Egon Petri about these results on 6 October 1906: "The Deutsches Theater [Reinhardt's theater] wants to perform Turandot in the spring. An attempt at this Chinoiserie in London has been abortive. The abortion of my heavy load."

As is often the case in such a complex undertaking, the German production encountered various delays and difficulties. Busoni refused to allow changes to the score: the required 60-piece orchestra, unusually large for a play, inflated the prospective budget enormously and immediately became a major problem. Furthermore, Reinhardt's career had soared from 1905 onwards, and he was creating, lighting and acting in new productions in two theatres at an astounding rate. He was an incredibly busy man, and everything would have to be completely ready for a speedy production.

Another significant problem was the lack of a suitable German version of Gozzi's Italian play. The dynamic young writer Karl Vollmöller who was to do the translation was also extremely busy on other less literary projects. From February to April 1908 he was attached as a reporter to the Zust automobile race team in the 1908 New York-Paris Great Race, from New York through Siberia and Russia, Poland, Germany and France to Paris. His race reports were published in the NY Times, which gave front-page coverage to the event. He had also been jointly developing an aeroplane with his brother Hans from late 1904 onwards, and in 1910 Vollmöller flew their No.4 prototype a record 150 km non-stop from Canstatt (now Stuttgart) to Lake Constance. He did eventually make an adapted translation of Turandot in 1911, which he dedicated to Busoni.

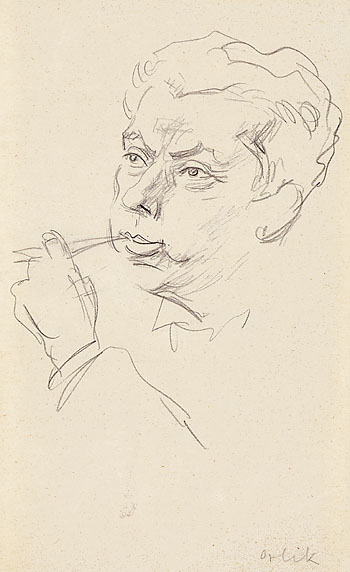
Max Reinhardt by Emil Orlik

The artist Emil Orlik who had been working with Reinhardt since 1905, was to design the sets and costumes. He had recently returned from a two-year journey to the Far East and was considered the leading German expert on chinoiserie. In the end Orlik was unable to participate in the production, and the sets and costumes were done by Ernst Stern. Orlík did, however, provide the cover for Breitkopf & Härtel's 1906 score of the Turandot Suite (see above).

In addition to these obstacles, Busoni himself had been undergoing a personal change. In 1906 he focused much of his attention on what was to become a highly influential essay: the Outline of a New Aesthetic of Music (completed in November 1906 and published in 1907). And from September to December 1907 he was composing the Elegies, BV 249, which marked a major turning-point in his musical development. From February 1906 to October 1911 he composed his first opera, Die Brautwahl ("The Bridal Quest", BV 258), an enormously lengthy and ambitious "musical-fantastic comedy" based on a tale by E. T. A. Hoffmann. The music of the opera is an eclectic mix, with quotations from other composers, such as Rossini and Mozart, and others more obscure. Its composition spans the years when Busoni's style was evolving rapidly, and the music of the opera incorporates it all.

Although Busoni had refused to cut the score of his music for Turandot or reduce the size of the orchestra, he did agree to a Reinhardt request for more music. In 1911 he composed Verzweiflung und Ergebung ("Despair and Resignation", BV 248a) to be played between acts IV and V; he also added it between nos. 7 and 8 of the already lengthy Turandot Suite. His compositional growth during the intervening years is revealed in the new piece: Antony Beaumont describes the opening half as "one of the finest passages in all of the Turandot music."

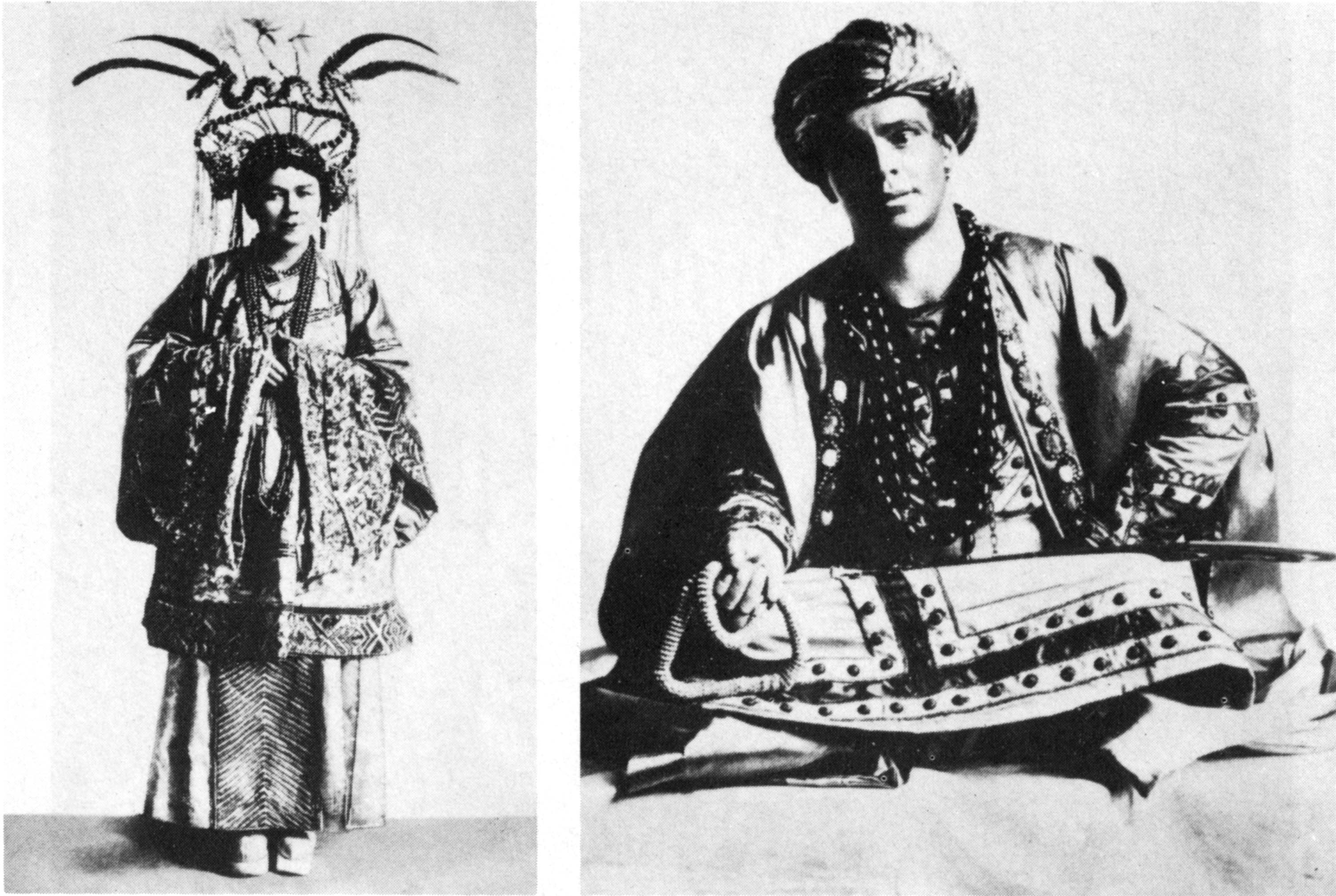
Gertrud Eysoldt as Turandot. Alessandro Moissi as Calaf. Max Reinhardt's production of Turandot, Berlin, 1911.

Vollmöller's Turandot with Busoni's music was finally first performed at the Deutsches Theater, Berlin, on 27 October 1911, with a very expensive orchestra conducted by Oskar Fried. Reinhardt was a hugely innovative director with the Deutsches Theater at his disposal, and Turandot was given plenty of publicity. An entire issue of the house magazine, (Blätter des Deutschen Theaters) was given over to the production. There were contributions from Busoni, Orlik, and Stefan Zweig among others.

Theatrical reviews of the production were mixed, one (justifiable) criticism being that the music from a 60-piece orchestra did not so much highlight as paint over the action. The music was thought not to be in the service of the play, but at times in service of itself (like Beethoven's Egmont or Mendelssohn's Midsummer Night's Dream).

A brief second-hand account of Reinhardt's production appears in a letter from Puccini of 18 March 1920 to his librettist Simoni:

Yesterday I talked to a foreign lady who told me about a production of this work in Germany with a mise-en-scene by Max Reinhardt, executed in a very curious and novel way [...] In Reinhardt's production Turandot was a tiny woman, surrounded by tall men, specifically chosen for their height; huge chairs, huge furnishings, and this viper of a woman with the strange heart of an hysteric.

=== London production ===
Vollmöller and Reinhardt's next venture together was the hugely successful production of Vollmöller's religious mime play The Miracle, which in opened in London on 23 December 1911 at the Olympia exhibition hall. It was made into a full-colour feature film with the same name by Joseph Menchen and Michel Carré with some of the original named cast, which premièred at Covent Garden with a continuous symphonic score by Engelbert Humperdinck on 21 December 1912.

The English theatre director Sir George Alexander was a man similar to Reinhardt. He was an equally active actor-manager who ran the St James' Theatre, London and played hundreds of roles in his career. Alexander was at the first performance of Turandot in Berlin, acquired the rights to it and brought Reinhardt's entire production to London in 1913. Jethro Bithell made an authorised English translation of the Gozzi-Vollmöller play.

Turandot (with Stern's scenery and costumes, and Fried conducting) opened on 8 January 1913 at the St James's Theatre, London. However, Busoni had not been to any rehearsals, and when he attended the first performance he was appalled. Johan Wijsman (the dedicatee of the Berceuse, BV 252), had made an unauthorised reduced version of Busoni's score for a 20-piece theatre orchestra. The producer had inserted music by other composers alongside Busoni's own, and the orchestra was out of tune. Busoni left in a rage after the second act and went to listen to Saint-Saëns' symphonic poem Le Rouet d'Omphale at another concert.

Carter, who had also seen the Berlin production, was very complimentary about the music. "quote" He also commented that the inferior lighting arrangements in the St. James' Theatre affected the production most. ref Carter book

After a fortnight Busoni had calmed down: in a letter to H.W. Draber, 21 Jan 1913, he wrote:

St. Saëns (and Rimsky K.) also contributed to the Turandot music (because mine was insufficient) - which was played in Varieté style by a 20-piece orchestra. The success was great!! The newspapers are captivated. Fascinating! How should one defend oneself?

In a letter on the same day in 1913 to his wife Gerda, Busoni said he had considered going to court over the affair, but realised the season would have been over before the case was finished. He also wonders what Gerda thinks about an opera in Italian based on Gozzi's play.

== Recordings ==
Note: Select the catalog number link for additional recording details.

Turandot Suite, BV 248 (1905)

- Cincinnati Symphony Orchestra; Michael Gielen, conductor; MMG MCD 10019; (1911 version with BV248a between nos. 7 & 8).
- Hong Kong Philharmonic; Samuel Wong, conductor; Naxos 8.555373; (1905 version).
- Philharmonic Orchestra of La Scala; Riccardo Muti, conductor; Sony Classical SK 53280; (1905 version; nos. 4 & 6 omitted).
- Royal Philharmonic Orchestra; Jascha Horenstein, conductor; Rococo RR 2036; (Nos. 4, 6, BV 248b, & 8b; LP not generally available as of 28 September 2009).

Verzweiflung und Ergebung, BV 248a (1911)

- Cincinnati Symphony Orchestra; Michael Gielen, conductor; MMG MCD 10019; (included as part of the entire suite).
- Berlin Radio Symphony Orchestra; Gerd Albrecht, conductor; Capriccio 10 479.

Altoums Warnung, BV 248b (1917)

- Royal Philharmonic Orchestra; Jascha Horenstein, conductor; Rococo RR 2036; (see also above; LP not generally available as of 28 September 2009).

== Downloadable scores ==
Scores are available for download from the International Music Score Library Project.

== Manuscript and publication details ==
Note: This section needs additional work.

BV 248 original title: Orchesteruite aus der Musik zu Gozzi's Märchendrama Turandot [Suite from the Music to Gozzi's Fairy Tale Drama Turandot] (Beaumont, 1985, p. 76)

pub. B&H, 1906 PB 1976

== Sources ==
- Ambros, August Wilhelm (1862). Geschichte der Musik, Vol. 1. Breslau: F.E.C. Leuckhart. Google Books: Full Preview. Accessed 24 September 2009.
- Ashbrook, William; Powers, Harold (1991). Puccini's Turandot: The End of the Great Tradition. Princeton: Princeton University Press. ISBN 0-691-02712-9.
- Beaumont, Antony (1985). Busoni the Composer. London: Faber and Faber. ISBN 0-571-13149-2.
- Beaumont, Antony, ed. (1987). Busoni: Selected Letters. New York: Columbia University Press. ISBN 0-231-06460-8.
- Betteridge, Harold T. (1958). The New Cassell's German Dictionary. New York: Funk & Wagnalls Co.
- Busoni, Ferruccio (1906). Orchestersuite aus der Musik zu Gozzi's Märchendrama "Turandot". Study Score, cat. no. Part.-Biibl. 3837 (reissue of the original 1906 score). Wiesbaden: Breitkopf & Härtel. See this work page of the International Music Score Library Project. Accessed 28 September 2009.
- Carter, Huntly (1914). The Theatre of Max Reinhardt. New York: Mitchell Kennerley. Archive.org OCR text. Accessed 24 September 2009.
- Couling, Della (2005). Ferruccio Busoni: A musical Ishmael. Lanham, Maryland: Scarecrow Press. ISBN 0-8108-5142-3.
- Dent, Edward J. (1933). Ferruccio Busoni: A Biography. London: Oxford University Press. (Reprint: London: Ernst Eulenberg, 1974. ISBN 0-903873-02-8.)
- Kindermann, Jürgen (1980). Thematisch-chronologisches Verzeichnis der Werke von Ferruccio B. Busoni. Studien zur Musikgeschichte des 19. Jahrhunderts, vol. 19. Regensburg: Gustav Bosse Verlag. ISBN 3-7649-2033-5.
- La Grange, Henry-Louis de, (2008). Gustav Mahler, volume 4: A New Life Cut Short (1907-1911). New York: Oxford University Press. ISBN 978-0-19-816387-9.
- Ley, Rosamond, translator (1938). Ferruccio Busoni: Letters to His Wife. London: Edward Arnold & Co.
- Vollmöller, Karl (1911). Turandot chinesisches Märchenspiel von Carlo Gozzi; Deutsch von Karl Vollmoeller. Berlin: S. Fischer.
- Vollmöller, Karl (1913). Turandot, Princess of China. A Chinoiserie in Three Acts. Authorized English version by Jethro Bithell. London: T. Fisher Unwin. Project Gutenberg. Accessed 15 September 2009.
