= Walter de Gruyter (person) =

German businessman and publisher (1862–1923)

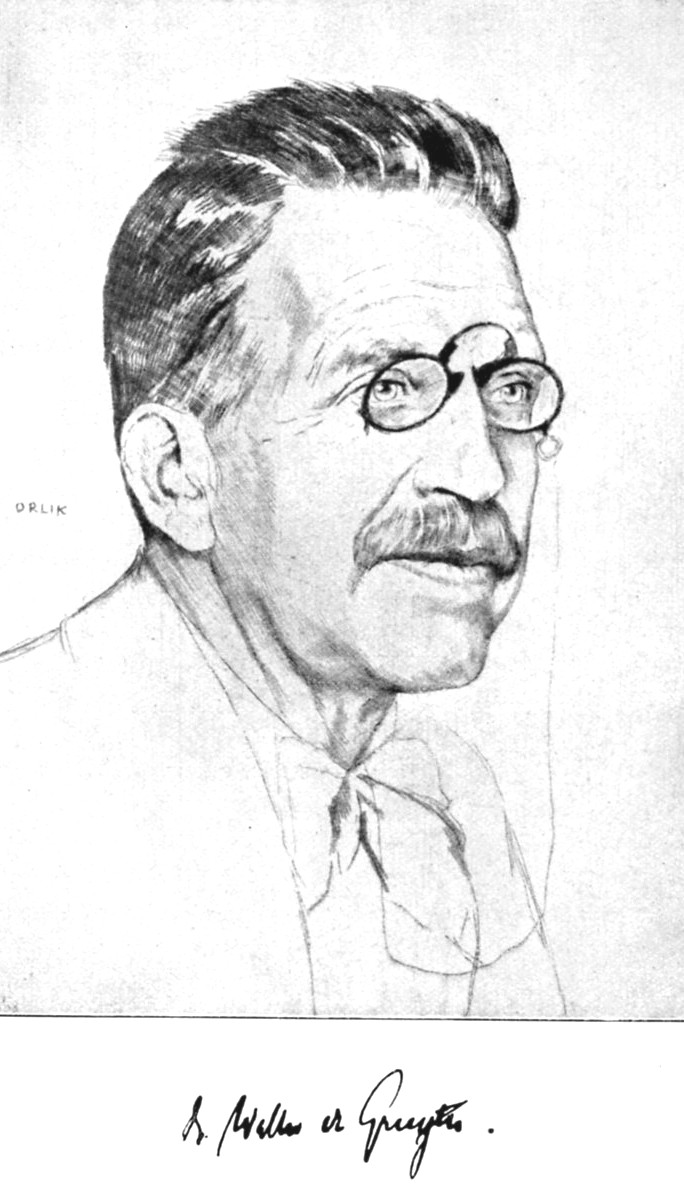
Walter de Gruyter, by Emil Orlik

Walter de Gruyter (1862–1923) was a German publisher and bookseller.

== Biography ==
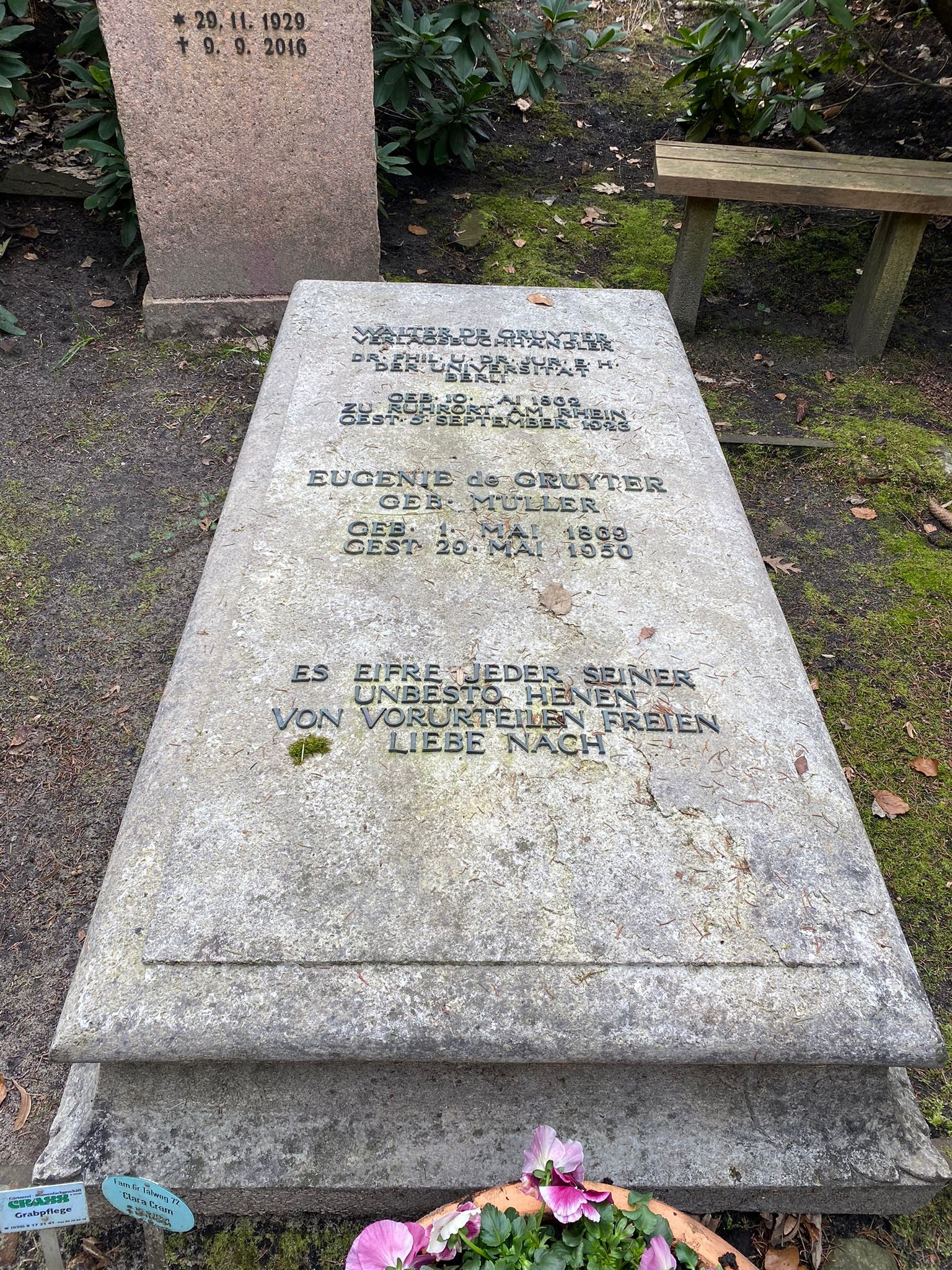
Graveyard of Walter de Gruyter

Born in Ruhrort in 1862, Walter de Gruyter took a position with Reimer Verlag in 1894 in Berlin. By 1897, at the age of 35, he had become sole proprietor of the hundred-year-old company then known for publishing the works of German romantics such as Johann Gottlieb Fichte, Friedrich Schleiermacher, and Heinrich von Kleist. De Gruyter later acquired four other publishing houses – Göschen, Guttentag, Trübner, and Veit – and, in 1919, merged them into one: Vereinigung wissenschaftlicher Verleger Walter de Gruyter & Co., located in Genthiner Straße in Berlin. The four publishers specialized in philosophy, theology, German literature, medicine, mathematics, engineering, law, political science, and natural science. By the time of his death in 1923, Walter de Gruyter had created one of the largest modern publishing houses in Europe.

== Personal life ==
De Gruyter was married to Eugenie Müller. Both of his sons, Hans and Georg, died in World War I. De Gruyter's son-in-law, Herbert Cram, who married Clara de Gruyter, succeeded him in the management of the company and it continues to be family-owned. His daughter Elle de Gruyter married German lawyer Karl-August Crisolli and later German publisher Burkhard Meier.
