= Psalm 83 (Zemlinsky) =

1900 composition by Austrian composer Alexander von Zemlinsky

- by Alexander von Zemlinsky
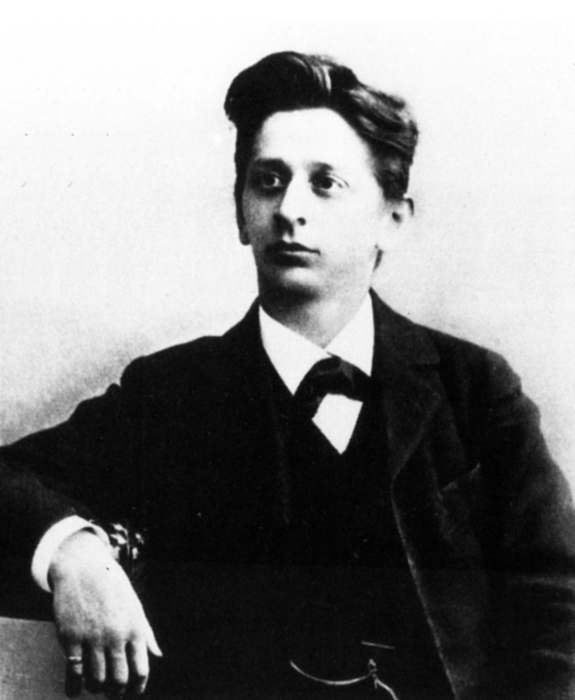
- Alexander von Zemlinsky, in 1900
- Native name: Der 83. Psalm
- Form: Sacred work
- Text: Psalm 83
- Language: German
- Composed: 10 September 1900
- Scoring: Chorus and orchestra

Psalm 83 (German: Der 83. Psalm), sometimes also stylized as Psalm LXXXIII and least commonly subtitled A Prayer for Help against Enemies of the People, is a 1900 composition for mixed chorus and orchestra by Austrian composer Alexander von Zemlinsky.

== Composition ==
This composition was created during a very turbulent period of Zemlinsky's life. At this time he struggled for the love of his own student Alma Schindler and suffered the loss of his father, Adolf von Zemlinsky, ill with kidney stones, on June 29, 1900. The agonizing circumstances of his father's death tormented him for months. It was during this summer, as he had time to relax and recover for the upcoming season as a conductor in Vienna's Carltheater, that he decided to focus solely on his personal problems. Following the setting used for a work for Brahms's death several years earlier, Zemlinsky thought of a composition for mixed chorus and orchestra for grieving the death of his father.

Even though no letters of his intentions of dedicating this composition to his father exist, the character and text of the composition were meant to have a certain requiem-like atmosphere. Zemlinsky completed the work before starting the new season as a conductor, on September 10, 1900. The time that he was able to spend composing the Psalm proved useful, as he had had time to come with terms with the loss of his father and to ready himself for the coming challenges he would face in his professional life. The composition was later published by Zemlinsky's exclusive publishing house, Universal Edition, in an edition by Antony Beaumont.

== Structure ==
The composition is in one movement and its structure is similar to that of a symphonic poem. A regular performance of the work should take around 14 minutes to perform. The text used in the song is in German language. However, Zemlinsky omitted several sections of the original text of the Psalm 83 in order to make it reflect his own thoughts and experiences at that time. The composition is scored for a mixed chorus with soprano, alto, tenor and bass sections, and an orchestra with three flutes (third doubling piccolo), two oboes, cor anglais, two clarinets in A and B♭, bass clarinet in B♭, three bassoons, four horns in F, three trumpets in F, three trombones, bass tuba, timpani, cymbals, harp and a complete string section.
