= Symphony No. 2 (Zemlinsky) =

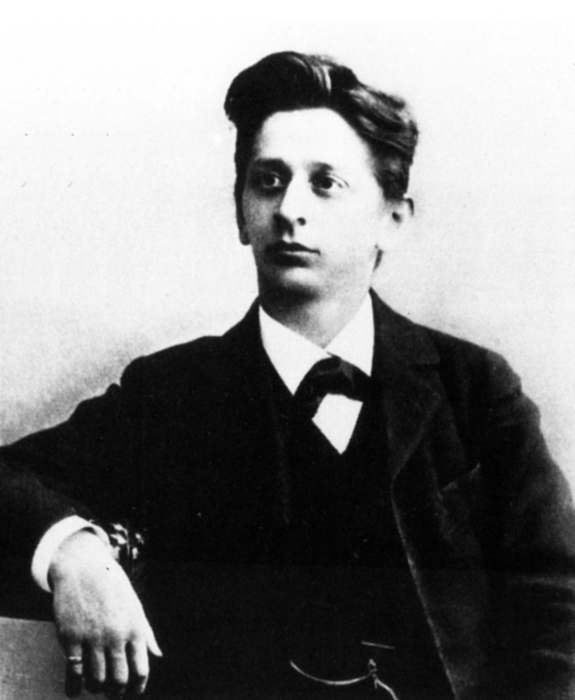
Alexander Zemlinsky c. 1900

Symphony No. 2 in B♭ major is an orchestral work by Austrian composer Alexander Zemlinsky. Although often referred to as ‘No. 2’, this designation is not the composer's own. It was actually his third essay in symphonic form following the symphonies in E minor of 1891 (of which only two movements are extant) and D minor (1892).

== Composition and performance ==
The work was composed in 1897 for submission to the Beethoven Prize, a competition initiated and partially funded by Johannes Brahms. Zemlinsky was awarded joint first place along with the Symphony in G major by Robert Gound. Both works were given their first performance on 5 March 1899 with the respective composers conducting the Vienna Philharmonic Orchestra. Despite its success, Zemlinsky made no effort thereafter to revive the work which remained unpublished until 1977.

== Structure ==
The work follows the customary four-movement shape of a traditional symphony, with the scherzo placed second and the slow movement third (as in Beethoven's Ninth Symphony). The movements are headed as follows:

1. Sostenuto – Allegro (Schnell, mit Feuer und Kraft)
2. Nicht zu schnell (Scherzando)
3. Adagio
4. Moderato

The final movement is a passacaglia modelled on the finale of Brahms's Symphony No. 4. Zemlinsky scholar Antony Beaumont has drawn attention to the use of a falling fifth as a unifying motif throughout the work.

Beaumont has also noted the stylistic influences of Brahms and Dvořák in particular.

The work has a performance duration of approximately 45 minutes.

== Instrumentation ==
The work is scored for an orchestra of: two flutes, two oboes, two clarinets, two bassoons, four horns, two trumpets, three trombones, tuba, timpani, and strings.
