= Emil Orlik =

Czech-German painter, etcher and lithographer (1870–1932)

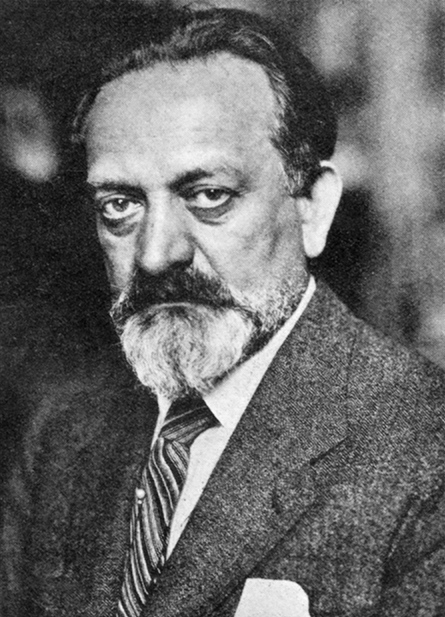
Orlik in 1932

Emil Orlik (21 July 1870 – 28 September 1932) was a Czech-German painter, etcher and lithographer. He lived and worked in Prague, Austria and Germany.

== Biography ==
Orlik was born on 21 July 1870 in Prague, Bohemia, Austria-Hungary. He was the son of a Jewish tailor. He first studied art at the private art school of Heinrich Knirr, where one of his fellow pupils was Paul Klee. From 1891, he studied at the Munich Academy under Wilhelm Lindenschmit. Later he learned engraving from Johann Leonhard Raab and proceeded to experiment with various printmaking processes. His oldest portraits date from the years 1891–1893.

After completing his military service in Prague, he returned to Munich, where he worked for the magazine Jugend. He spent most of 1898, travelling through Europe, visiting the Netherlands, Great Britain, Belgium, and Paris. During this time he became aware of Japanese art, and the impact it was having in Europe, and decided to visit Japan to learn woodcut techniques. He left for Asia in March 1900, stopping off in Hong Kong, before reaching Japan, where he stayed until February 1901.

In 1905 Orlik moved to Berlin and took a post at the "School for Graphic and Book Art" of the Museum of Decorative Arts (Kunstgewerbemuseum), now part of the Berlin State Museums. He taught at the Berlin College of Arts and Crafts, where one of his students was George Grosz.

Orlik's work is held in the permanent collections of several museums worldwide, including the Princeton University Art Museum, the British Museum, the Museum of Modern Art, the University of Michigan Museum of Art, the Worcester Art Museum, the Harvard Art Museums, the Clark Art Institute, the Chazen Museum of Art, the Brooklyn Museum, the National Museum of Western Art, the Cleveland Museum of Art, the Artizon Museum, the Fine Arts Museum of San Francisco, the Portland Art Museum, the Fairfield University Museum, and the Metropolitan Museum of Art.

Orlik died in Berlin on 28 September 1932.

== Gallery ==
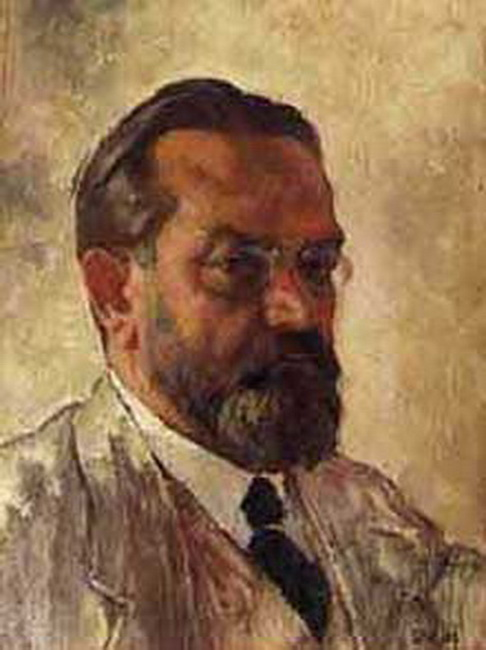
Self portrait

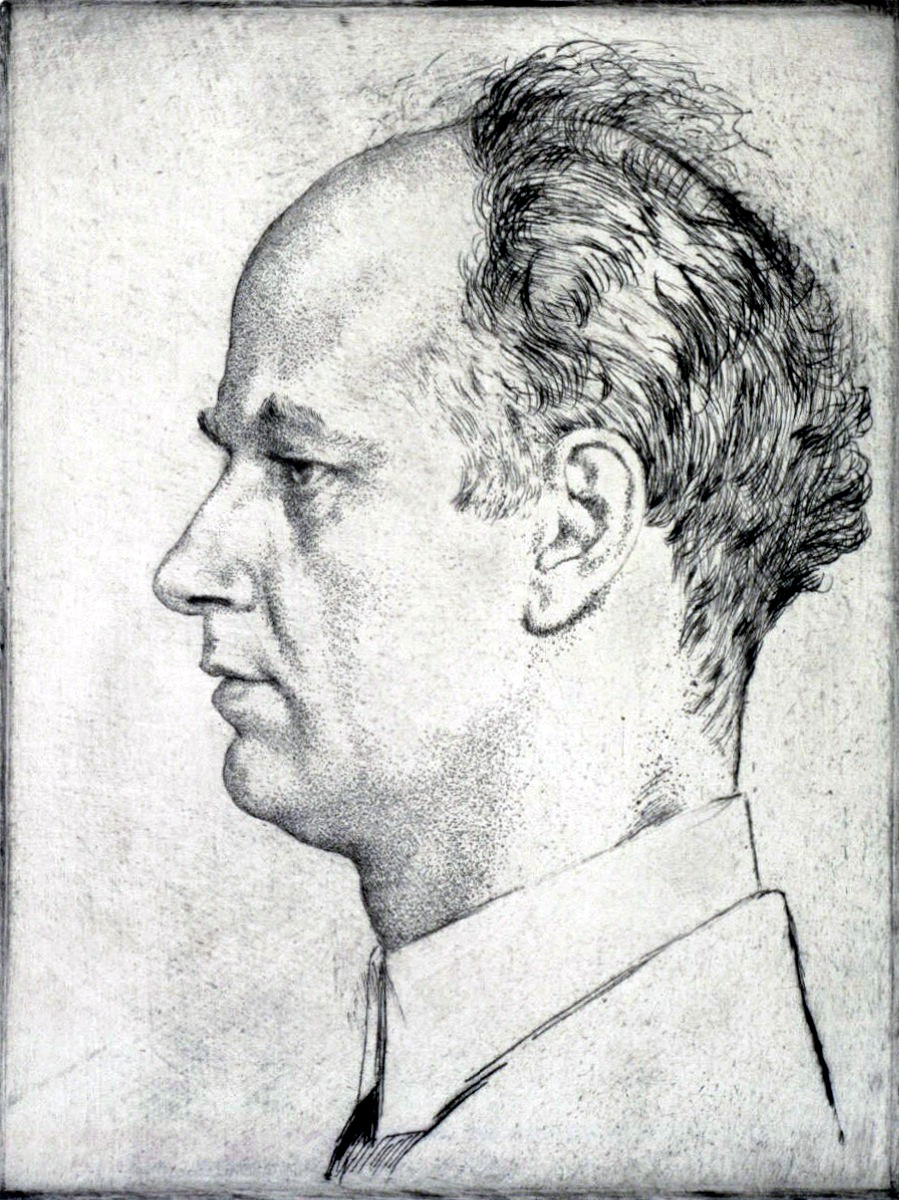
Wilhelm Furtwängler, conductor (1928)
(etching with drypoint, printed with tone)

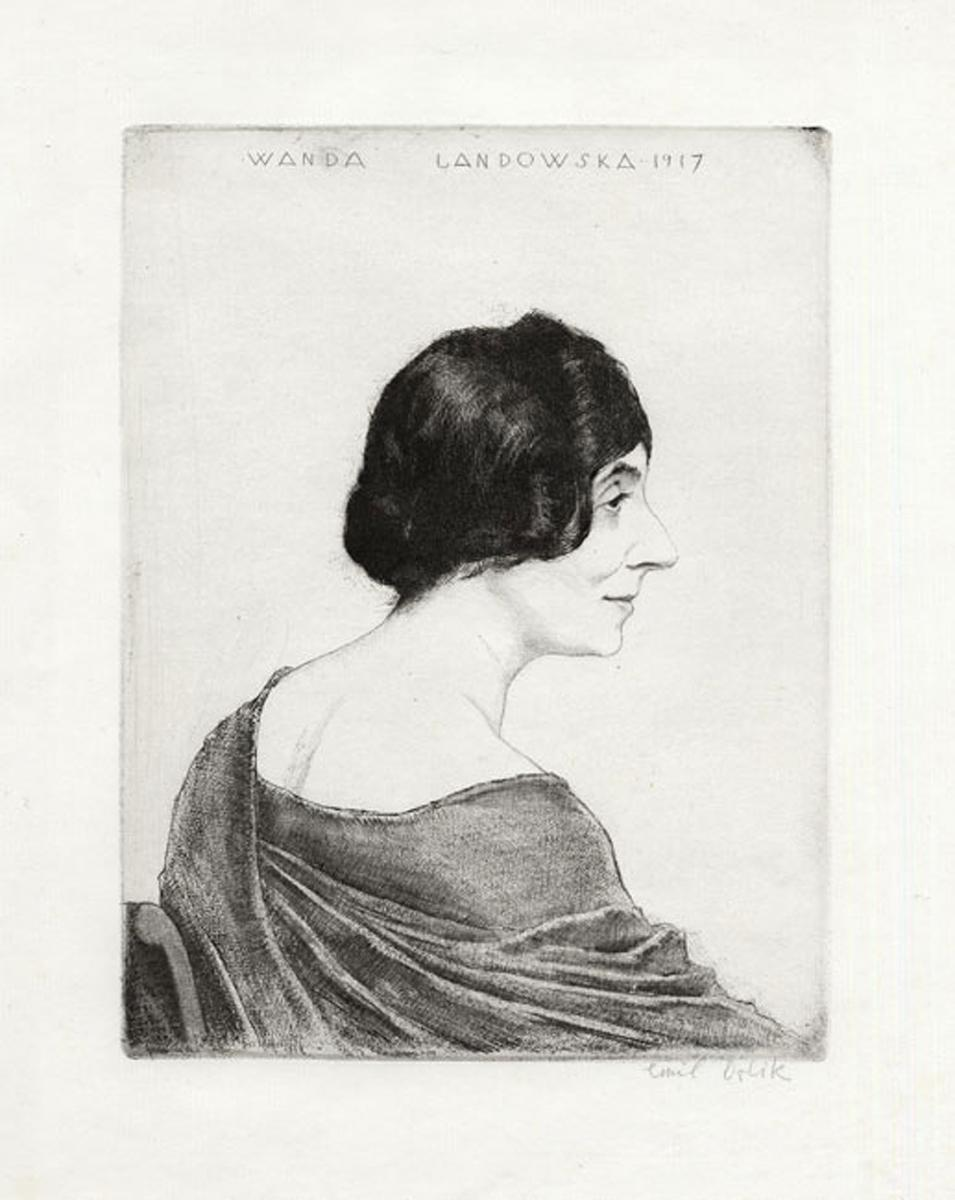
Wanda Landowska, harpsichordist (1917)

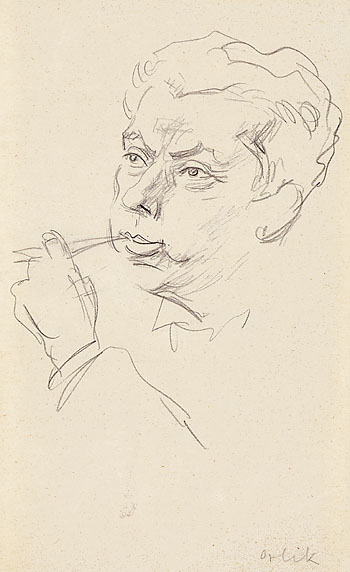
Max Reinhardt, theatre and film director and actor

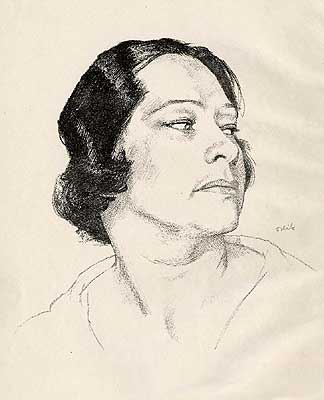
Tilla Durieux, Austrian actress (1922)

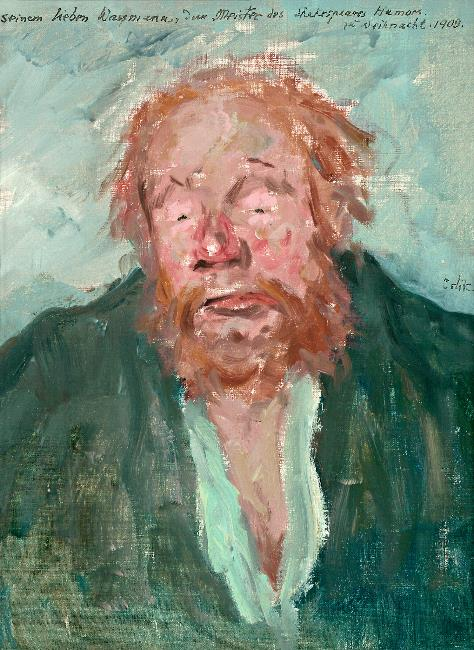
Hans Wassmann as Nick Bottom (1909)

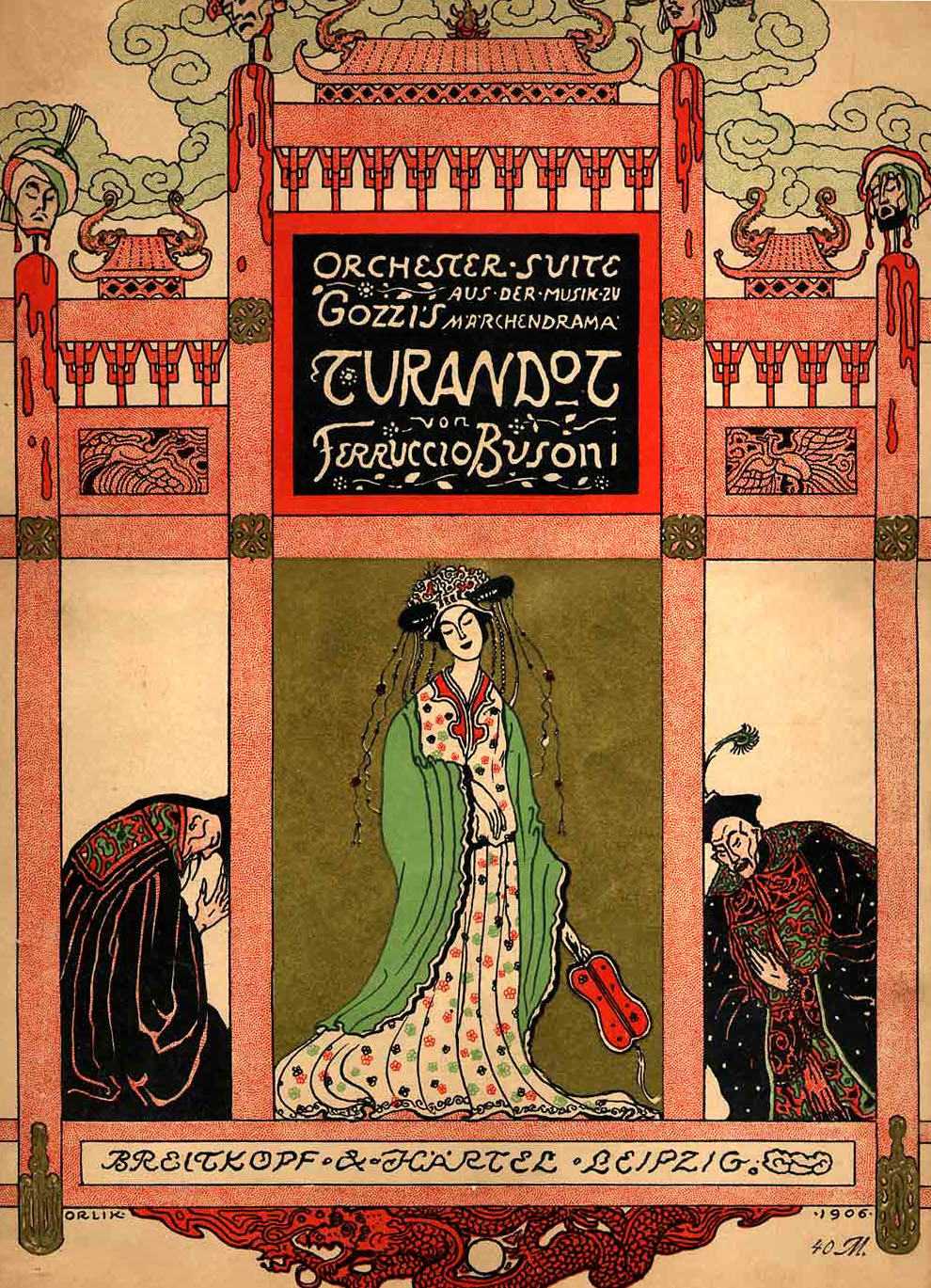
Cover for the score of the Turandot Suite
by Ferruccio Busoni (1906)

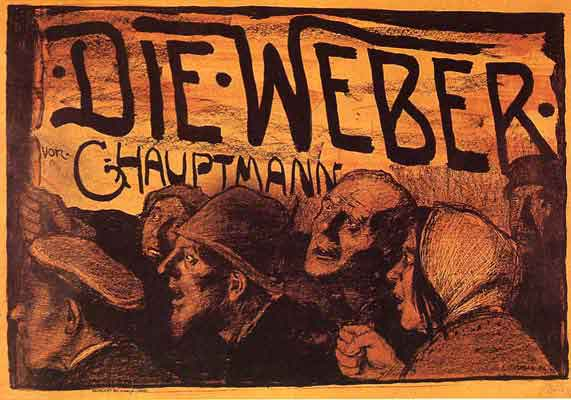
Poster for the play Die Weber
by Gerhart Hauptmann (1897)

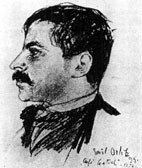
Jakob Wassermann, novelist (1899)

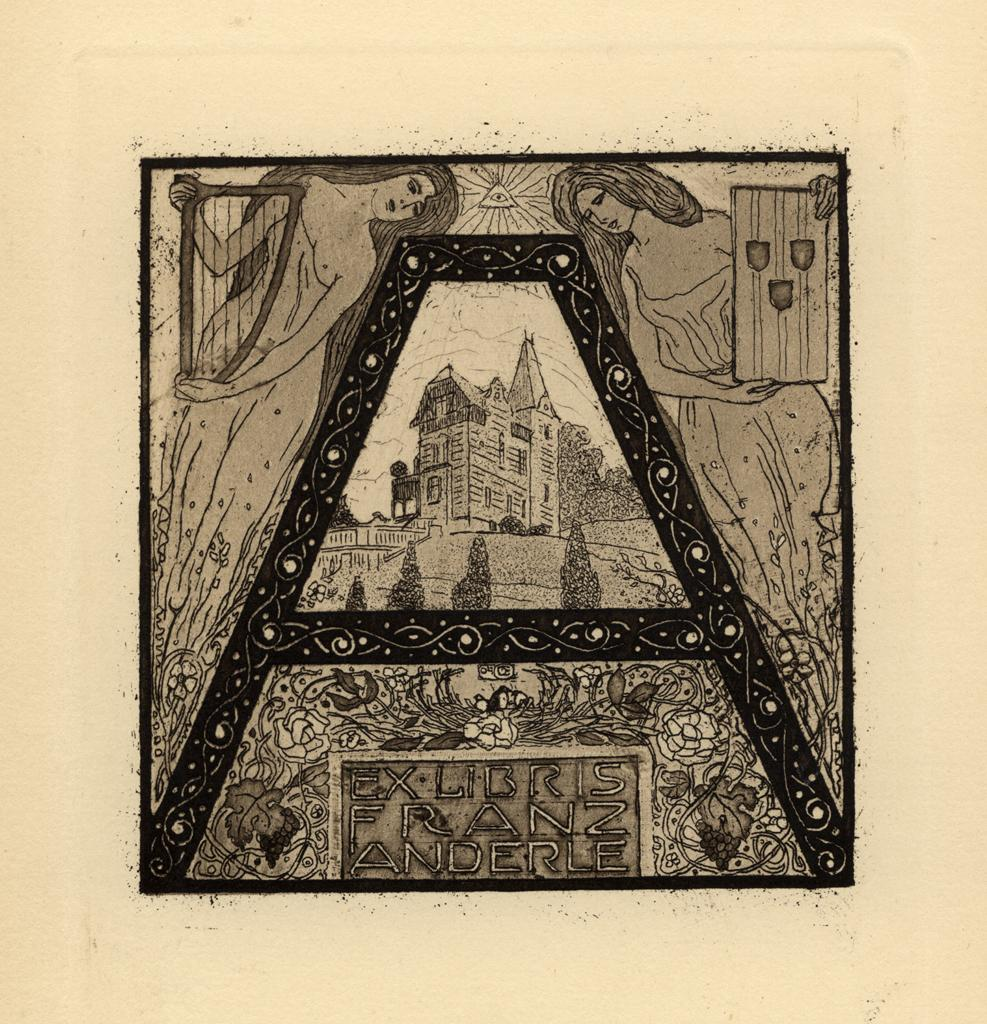
Bookplate for the books of Franz Anderle

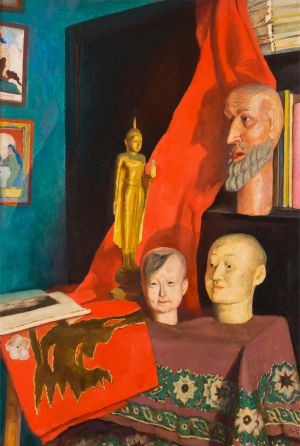
Kout v mém ateliéru (Corner of My Studio), in the Czech National Gallery in Prague

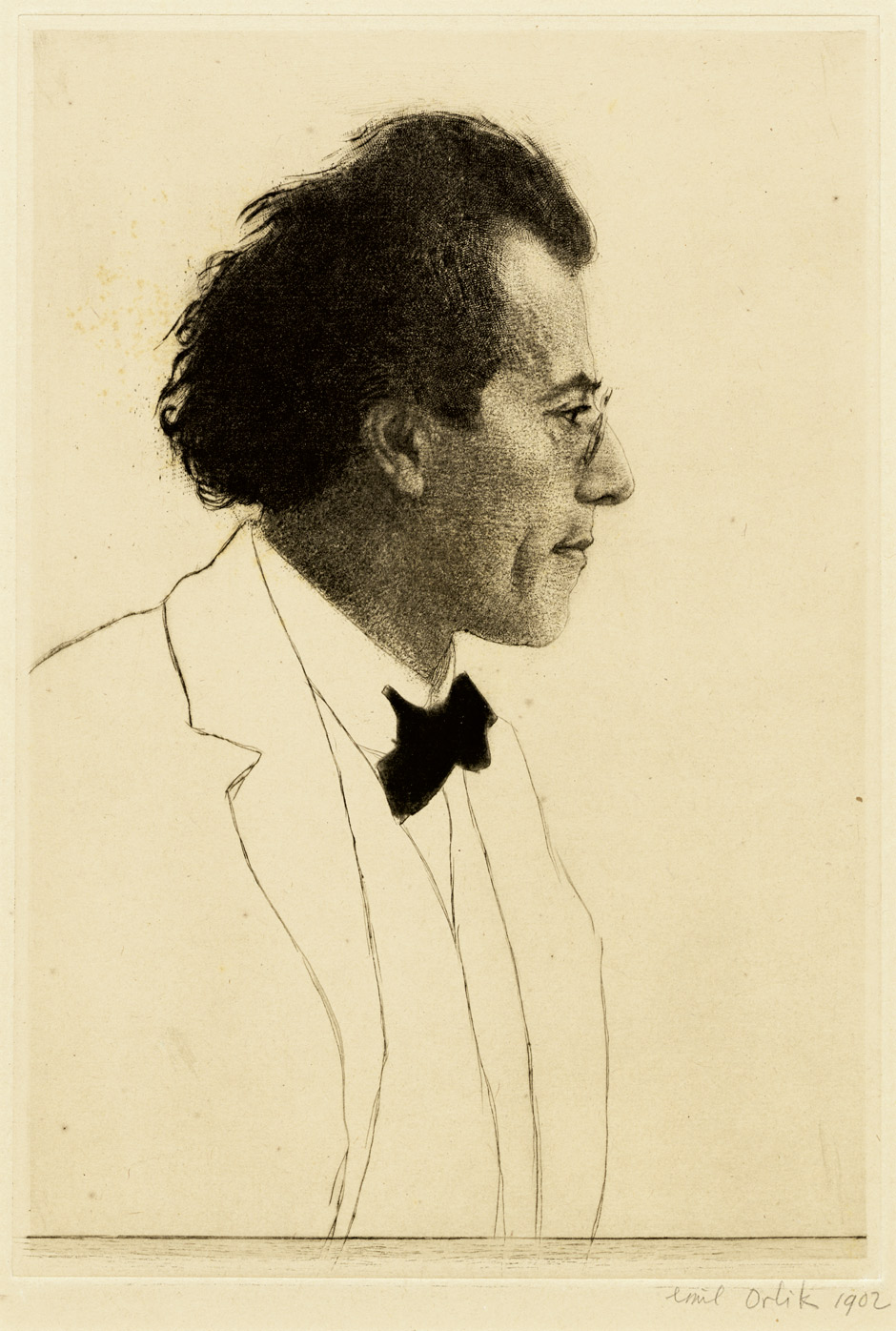
Gustav Mahler, composer, (1902)

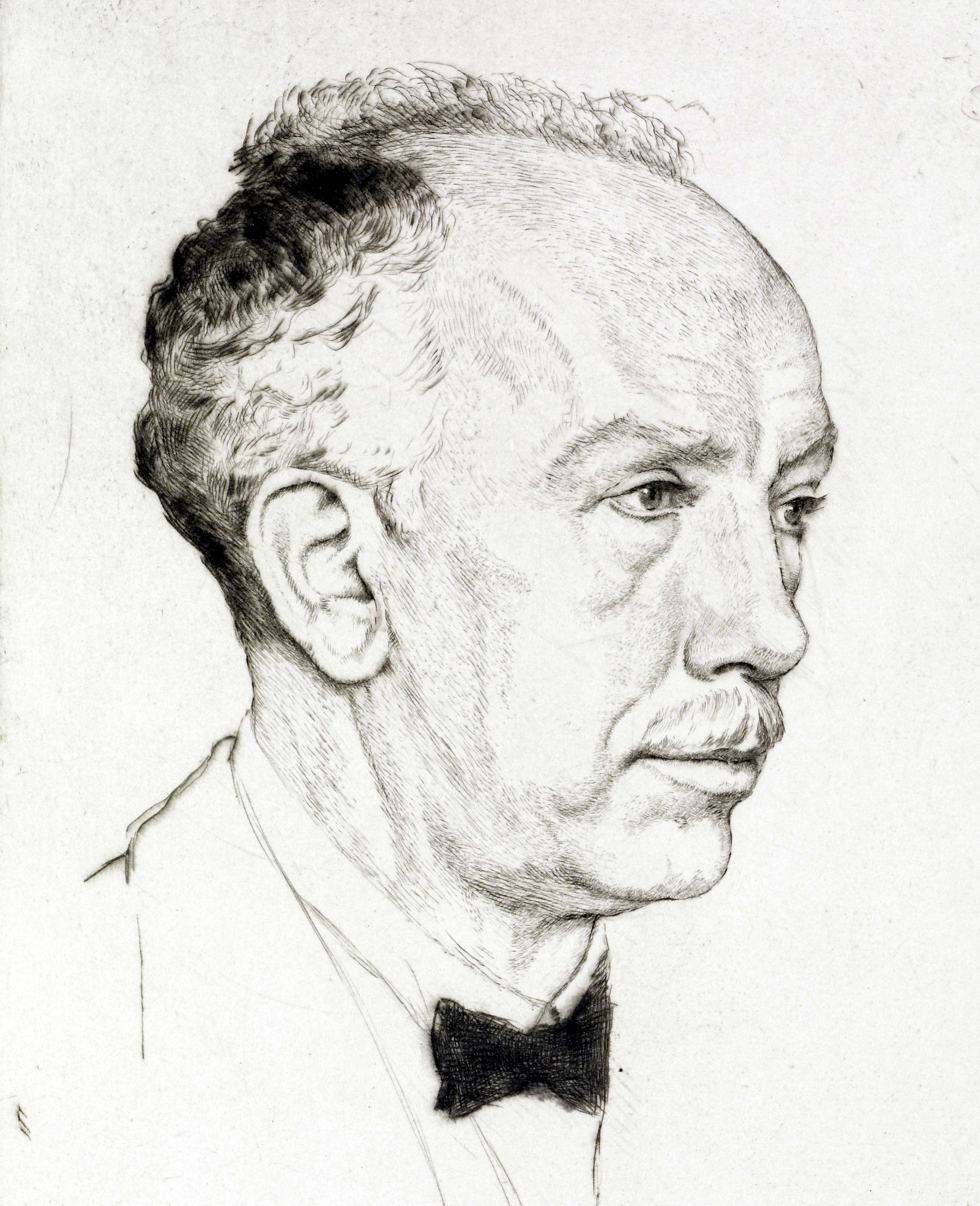
Richard Strauss, composer (1917)

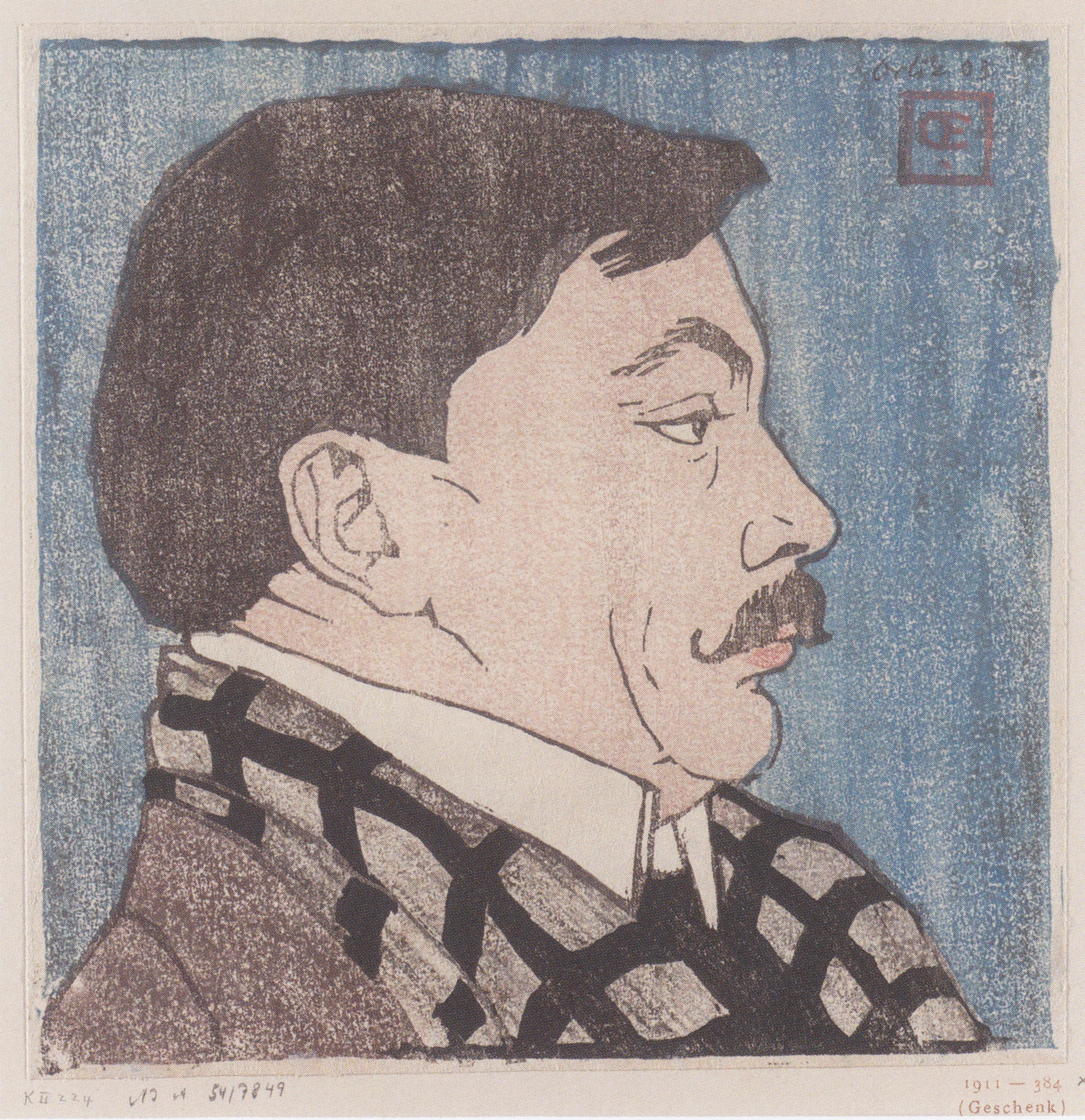
Kolo Moser, color woodcut, 18.2 × 18.5 cm, 1903

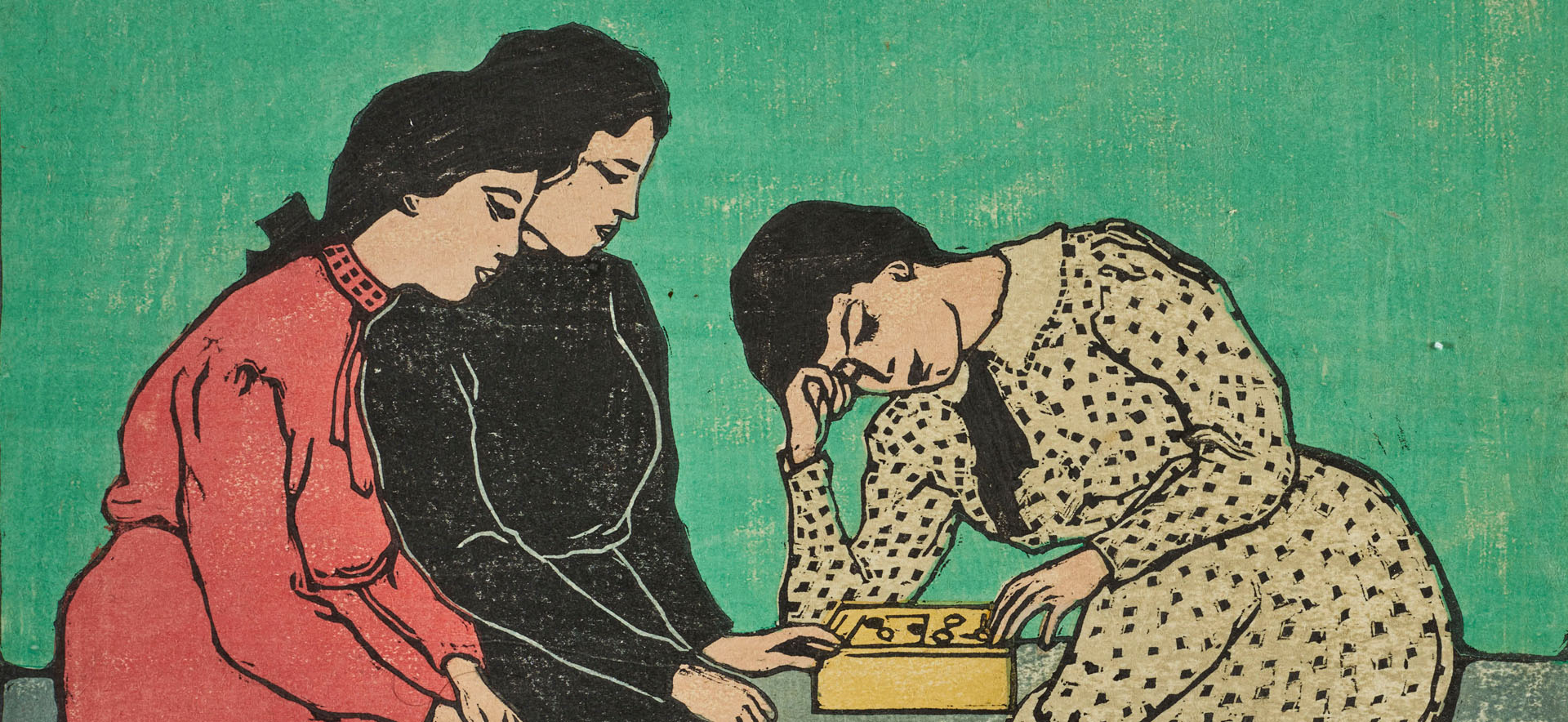
Drei Mädchen beim Brettspiel, c. 1907, Farbholzschnitt

== See also ==
- Vienna Secession
- Shin-hanga
