= Es war einmal =

- Fairy-tale opera by Alexander von Zemlinsky
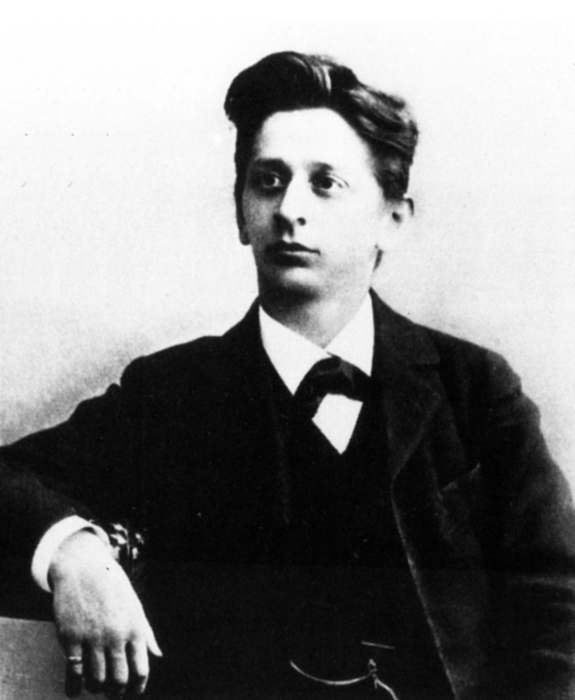
- The composer in 1908
- Librettist: Maximilian Singer
- Language: German
- Based on: Der var engang by Holger Drachmann
- Premiere: 22 January 1900; Vienna State Opera

Es war einmal (Once upon a time) is a fairy-tale opera in a prologue and three acts by the Austrian composer Alexander von Zemlinsky, composed during 1897-99. The libretto, an adaptation of Marie von Borch's German translation of the fairy-tale play Der var engang by the Danish author Holger Drachmann, was written by Maximilian Singer.

== Performance history ==
The opera was first performed on 22 January 1900 at the Vienna State Opera conducted by Gustav Mahler with Selma Kurz and Erik Schmedes in the principal roles. Mahler insisted on numerous changes during rehearsals: the closing portion of Act One was reworked and several cuts implemented, including the central section of the Prelude. The successful premiere resulted in a run of twelve performances. Zemlinsky made further revisions in 1912. Revivals followed in Mannheim in May of that year (with Zemlinsky's former pupil Artur Bodanzky conducting), and in October at the Neues Deutsches Theater in Prague, under the composer's direction.

== Roles ==
Role	Voice type	Premiere Cast 22 January 1900 (Conductor: Gustav Mahler)
Princess	soprano	Selma Kurz
Prince	tenor	Erik Schmedes
Kaspar	baritone	Wilhelm Hesch
King	bass	Franz von Reichenberg
A suitor	tenor	Franz Pacal
A commissionaire	baritone	Arthur Preuß
Commander	bass	Ferdinand Marian
Herald	bass	Benedikt Felix
First lady in waiting	soprano	Jenny Pohlner

== Instrumentation ==
- 3 flutes (2nd and 3rd doubling piccolo), 3 oboes (3rd doubling cor anglais), 2 clarinets in B-flat/A, bass clarinet, 3 bassoons (3rd ad lib);
- 4 horns, 3 trumpets, 3 trombones, bass tuba;
- timpani, percussion (cymbals, bass drum, side drum, triangle, glockenspiel), 2 harps;
- strings

offstage: 2 piccolos, 2 horns, 4 trumpets, trombone, tambourine, side drums, solo violin

== Recordings ==
In 1990 the German record label Capriccio released the world premiere recording: a June 1987 recording from Danish Radio with Hans Graf conducting the Danish National Radio Symphony Orchestra and Chorus. The principal roles were sung by Eva Johansson (Princess), Kurt Westi (Prince), Per-Arne Wahlgren (Kaspar) and Aage Haugland (King). This performance was the first since the Prague staging of 1912.

The original version of the Prelude, reinstating the 30-bar central section omitted in Mahler's performances, was recorded by the Czech Phiharmonic Orchestra conducted by Antony Beaumont in 2001.
