= Symphonische Gesänge =

Composition by Alexander von Zemlinsky

- by Alexander von Zemlinsky
- Opus: 20
- Composed: 1929
- Dedication: To the memory of Ida
- Performed: 8 April 1935 — Brno
- Published: 1977
- Duration: 18 minutes
- Movements: 7
- Scoring: Baritone (or alto) and orchestra

Symphonische Gesänge, Op. 20 (English: Symphonic Songs) is a set of songs for baritone (or alto) and orchestra composed in 1929 by Austrian composer Alexander von Zemlinsky.

== Composition ==
Zemlinsky composed the songs in the early part of 1929 and orchestrated them in the summer of that year while holidaying in Juan-les-Pins. The composer used texts extracted from a Viennese anthology of poems from the Harlem Renaissance entitled Afrika Singt (English: Africa Sings), edited by Anna Nussbaum and published in Vienna and Leipzig (F. G. Speidel) in early 1929. The set was dedicated to the memory of Zemlinsky's wife Ida who had died in January 1929. Some of the poems from the Nussbaum anthology were also used by Wilhelm Grosz in his score Afrika Songs, with translation assistance by the composer's granddaughter Jean Forman.

Zemlinsky's direct experience of African societies and music was limited. However, he identified with the plight of black Americans as it reflected the post-World War I experience of many Jews in both Germany and Austria

The work was premiered in a studio broadcast in Brno on 8 April 1935, conducted by Heinrich Jalowetz. It was not performed again until 1964 in Baltimore. The score was published in 1977 by Universal Edition.

== Structure and style ==
The set features a total of seven songs and has a performance duration of approximately 18 minutes. The titles of the songs are as follows:

1. Lied aus Dixieland (text by Langston Hughes)
2. Lied der Baumwollpacker (text by Jean Toomer)
3. Totes braunes Mädel (text by Countee Cullen)
4. Übler Bursche (text by Langston Hughes)
5. Erkenntnis (text by Langston Hughes)
6. Afrikanischer Tanz (text by Langston Hughes)
7. Arabeske (text by Frank Horne)

In common with other works from the same period such as his String Quartet No. 3 and his opera Der Kreidekreis, Zemlinsky relies on tight motivic cells, static ostinato patterns and restraint characteristic of Neue Sachlichkeit. The austere, Berg-like, pared-down style is far from the jazzy, rhythmic "swing" he used in some other compositions from this period, developed after having conducted Ernst Krenek's Jonny spielt auf and Kurt Weill's Aufstieg und Fall der Stadt Mahagonny, two operas that incorporate jazz elements into their musical idiom.

== Instrumentation ==
The orchestra consists of: piccolo, two flutes, three oboes (3rd doubling cor anglais), two clarinets in B♭, bass clarinet (doubling E♭ clarinet), three bassoons (3rd doubling contrabassoon), two horns in F, three trumpets in C, three trombones, bass tuba, timpani, percussion (3-4 players), mandolin and strings.

== Recordings ==
The following is a list of some of the most notable recordings of this work:

Conductor	Orchestra	Baritone (or alto)	Label	Year of Recording
Riccardo Chailly	Royal Concertgebouw Orchestra	Willard White	Decca Records	1993
