= Alexander von Zemlinsky =

Austrian composer, conductor, and teacher (1871–1942)

Alexander Zemlinsky
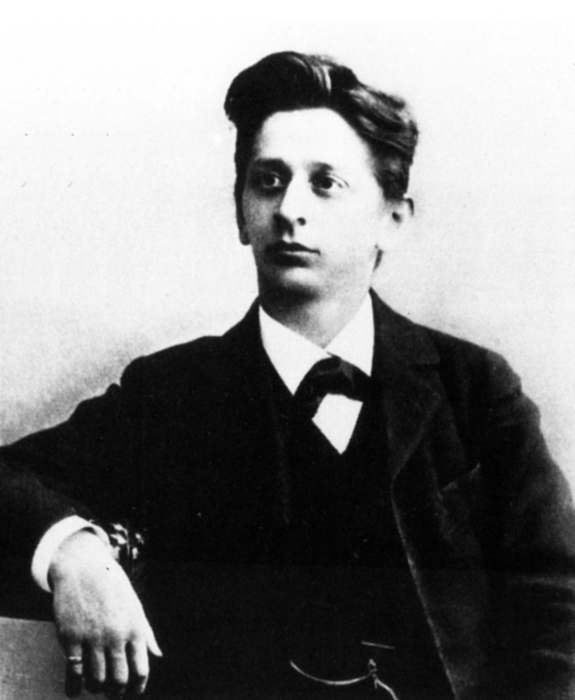
- Zemlinsky c. 1900
- Born: 14 October 1871; Vienna, Austria-Hungary
- Died: 15 March 1942 (aged 70); Larchmont, New York, US
- Education: Vienna Conservatory
- Occupations: Conductor; Composer; Academic
- Organizations: Vienna Volksoper; Deutsches Landestheater, Prague; Kroll Opera, Berlin

Alexander Zemlinsky or Alexander von Zemlinsky (14 October 1871 – 15 March 1942) was an Austrian composer, conductor, and teacher.

== Biography ==
=== Early life ===
Zemlinsky was born in Vienna to a highly diverse family. Zemlinsky's grandfather, Anton Semlinski, emigrated from Žilina, Hungary (now in Slovakia) to Austria and married an Austrian woman. Both were from staunchly Roman Catholic families, and Alexander's father, Adolf von Zemlinszky, was raised as a Catholic. Alexander's mother, Clara Semo, was born in Sarajevo to a Sephardic Jewish father and a Bosniak mother. Alexander's entire family converted to the religion of his maternal grandfather, Judaism, and Zemlinsky was born and raised Jewish. His father added an aristocratic "von" to his name, though neither he nor his forebears were ennobled. He also began spelling his surname in Hungarian "Zemlinszky". He was also a freemason.

Alexander studied the piano from a young age. He played the organ in his synagogue on holidays, and was admitted to the Vienna Conservatory in 1884. He studied piano with Wilhelm Rauch and Anton Door, winning the school's piano prize in 1890. He continued his studies until 1892, studying theory with Robert Fuchs and composition with Johann Nepomuk Fuchs and Anton Bruckner. At this time he began writing music.

In Johannes Brahms, Zemlinsky had a valuable supporter. In July 1892, on the invitation of Zemlinsky's teacher Johann Nepomuk Fuchs, Brahms attended a performance of the first movement of Zemlinsky's Symphony in D minor at the Conservatoire. In March 1896, Brahms attended a performance of Zemlinsky's String Quintet in D minor by the Hellmesberger Quartet. Impressed with Zemlinsky's music, Brahms recommended the younger composer's Clarinet Trio (1896) to the N. Simrock company for publication.

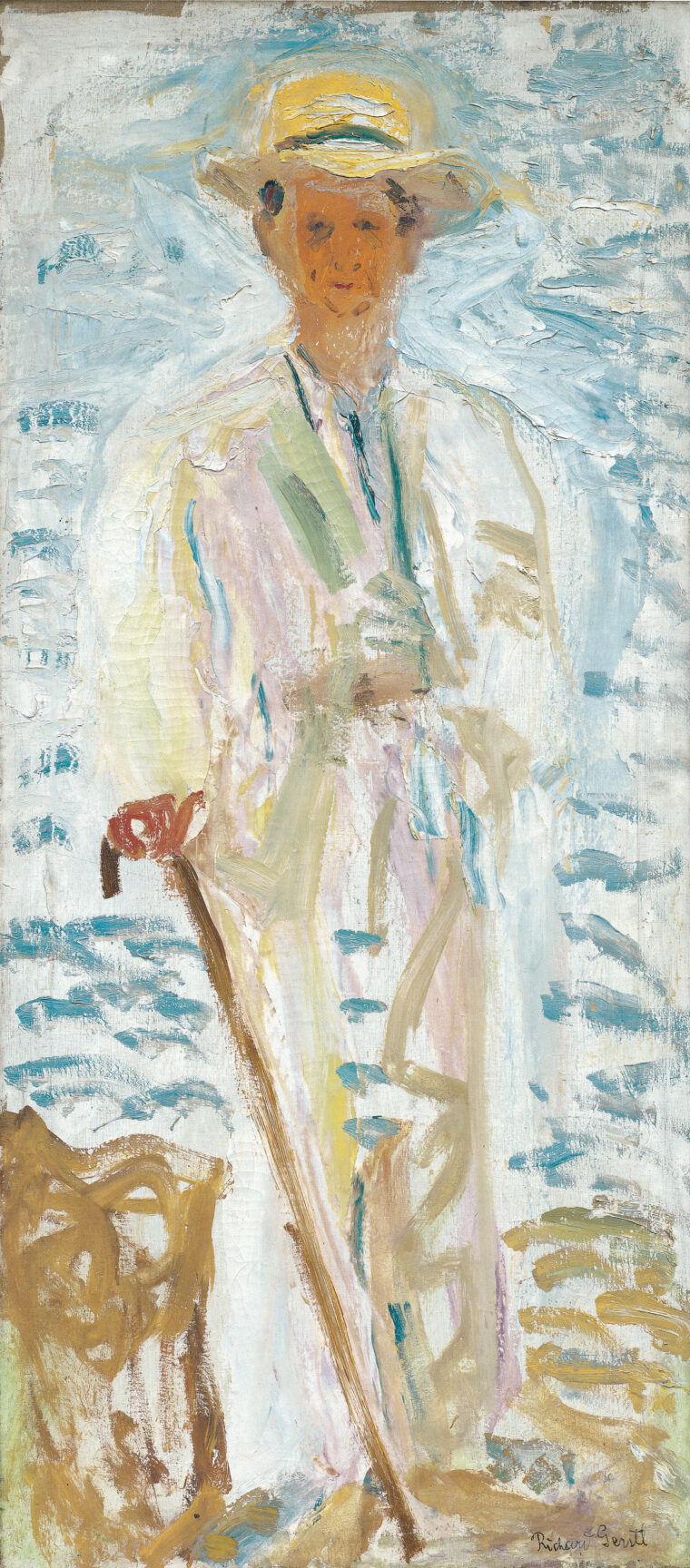
Portrait of Alexander von Zemlinsky by Richard Gerstl, July 1908.

Zemlinsky also met Arnold Schoenberg when the latter joined the amateur orchestra Polyhymnia as a cellist; Zemlinsky had founded this group in 1895. The two became close friends and later mutual admirers and brothers-in-law when Schoenberg married Zemlinsky's sister, Mathilde. Zemlinsky gave Schoenberg lessons in counterpoint, thus becoming the only formal music teacher Schoenberg would have.

In 1897, Zemlinsky composed his Symphony No. 2 (chronologically the third he had written, and sometimes numbered as such) for submission to the Beethoven Prize, a competition inaugurated and sponsored by Brahms. Zemlinsky won joint first prize, sharing the honours with Robert Gound. His reputation as a composer was further helped when Gustav Mahler conducted the premiere of his opera Es war einmal (Once Upon a Time) at the Hofoper in 1900. In 1899 Zemlinsky secured the post of Kapellmeister at Vienna's Carltheater.

In 1899, Zemlinsky converted to Protestantism. He alluded to the Christian cross and to Jesus in the text of Turmwächterlied, and included verses from Psalms in several of his compositions.

=== Middle years ===
In 1900, Zemlinsky met and fell in love with Alma Schindler, one of his composition students. She reciprocated his feelings initially; however, Alma felt a great deal of pressure from close friends and family to end the relationship. They were primarily concerned with Zemlinsky's lack of an international reputation and by an unappealing physical appearance. She broke off the relationship with Zemlinsky and subsequently married composer Gustav Mahler in 1902. The episode inspired Zemlinsky's orchestral fantasy Die Seejungfrau, completed in 1903 and first performed in 1905. Zemlinsky married Ida Guttmann in 1907, but the marriage was an unhappy one. Following Ida's death in 1929, Zemlinsky married Luise Sachsel in 1930, a woman twenty-nine years his junior, and to whom he had given singing lessons since 1914. This was a much happier relationship, lasting until Zemlinsky's death.

=== Last years ===
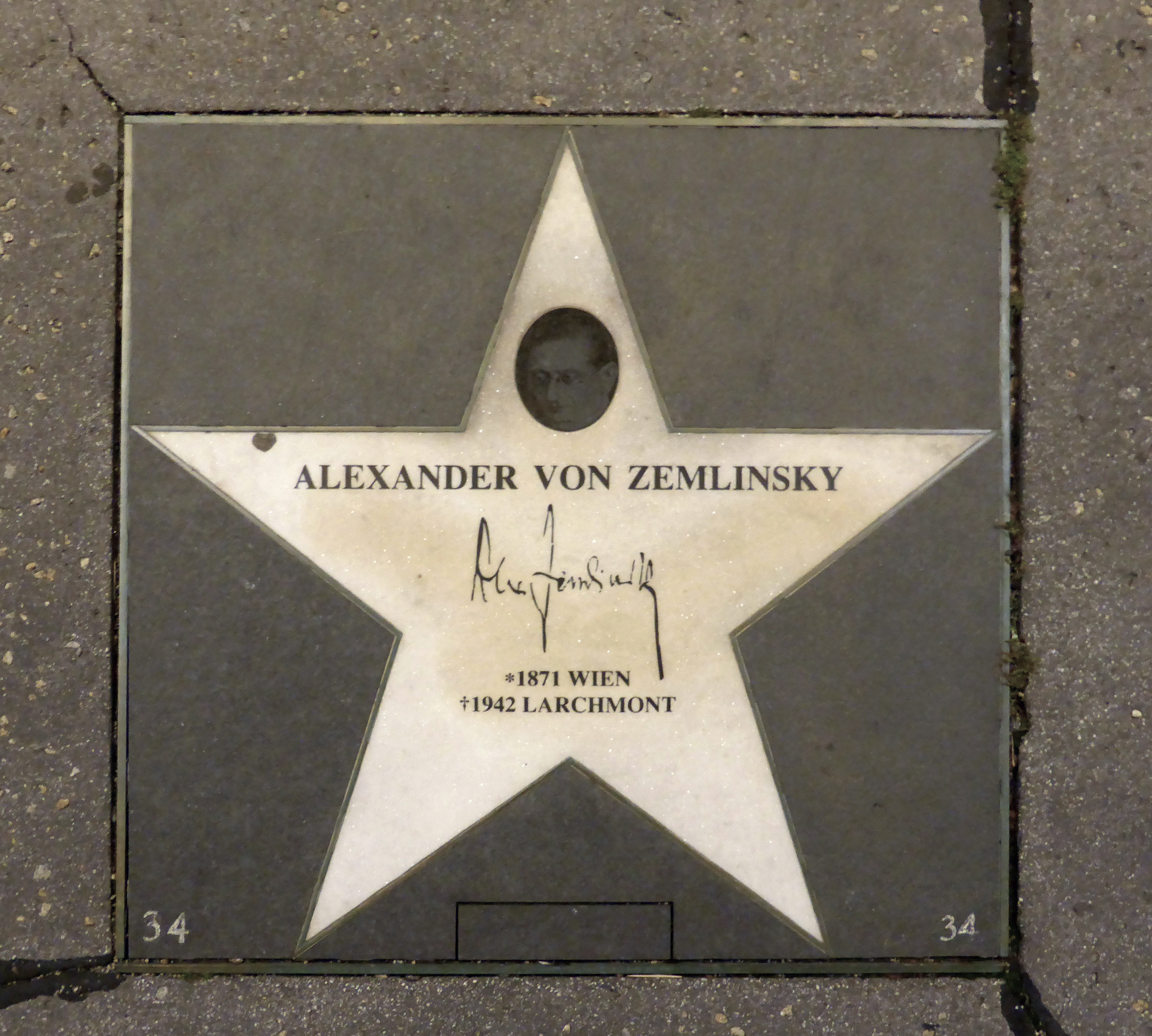
Walk of Fame Vienna

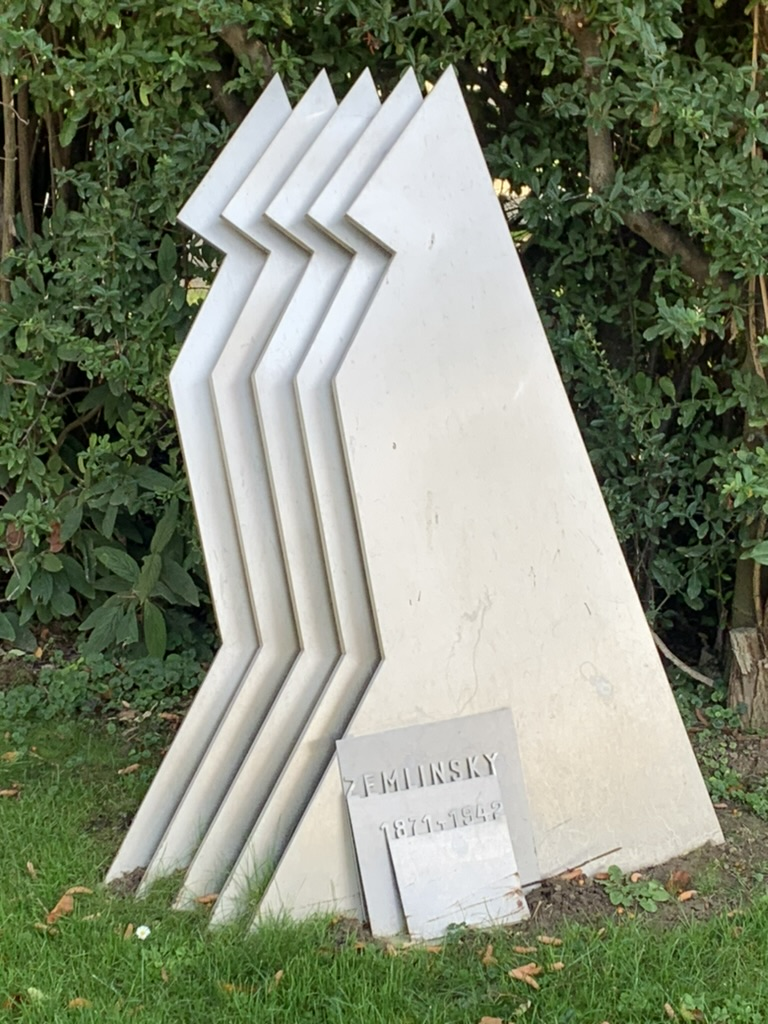
Zemlinsky's grave in the Zentralfriedhof, Vienna.

In 1906 Zemlinsky was appointed first Kapellmeister of the new Vienna Volksoper, from 1907/1908 at the Hofoper in Vienna. From 1911 to 1927, he was conductor at the Deutsches Landestheater in Prague, premiering Schoenberg's Erwartung in 1924. Zemlinsky then moved to Berlin, where he taught and worked under Otto Klemperer as a conductor at the Kroll Opera.

=== Nazi era ===
With the rise of the Nazi Party, he fled to Vienna in 1933, where he held no official post, instead concentrating on composing and making the occasional appearance as guest conductor. In 1938, the Zemlinsky couple managed to escape via Prague to New York. Their property was confiscated to pay for the "Reich Flight Tax" imposed on Jews. Their collection, which included "a work by Schiele, various engravings, carpets" was, according to the German Lost Art Foundation, "released and presumably exported to the USA."

Although fellow émigré Schoenberg was celebrated and feted in the Los Angeles of the 1930s and 40s – teaching at the University of California, Los Angeles and the University of Southern California and gaining a new generation of acolytes – Zemlinsky was neglected and virtually unknown in his adopted country. He fell ill, suffering a series of strokes, and ceased composing. Zemlinsky died in Larchmont, New York, of pneumonia in 1942.

== Compositions ==
Zemlinsky's best-known work is the Lyric Symphony (1923), a seven-movement piece for soprano, baritone and orchestra, set to poems by the Bengali poet Rabindranath Tagore (in German translation), which Zemlinsky compared in a letter to his publisher to Mahler's Das Lied von der Erde. The work in turn influenced Alban Berg's Lyric Suite, which quotes from it and is dedicated to Zemlinsky. Other orchestral works include the large-scale fantasy, Die Seejungfrau (The Mermaid), based on the tale of the same name by Hans Christian Andersen. It premiered in 1905 at the same concert as Schoenberg's Pelleas und Melisande. Zemlinsky withdrew the work, which was thought lost until two separated portions of the score were found to belong together in the 1980s. It was performed again in 1984 in Vienna and has become one of Zemlinsky's most frequently performed works. A three-movement Sinfonietta written in 1934, admired by Schoenberg and Berg, is written in a style comparable to contemporary works by Paul Hindemith and Kurt Weill.

Zemlinsky composed eight operas, including Eine florentinische Tragödie (1915–16) and the semi-autobiographical Der Zwerg (The Dwarf, 1919–21), both based on works by Oscar Wilde; chamber music, including four string quartets, and an unfinished ballet Der Triumph der Zeit (1901). He also composed works for chorus and orchestra including three psalm settings as well as numerous song cycles, both with piano and with orchestra, of which the Sechs Gesänge, Op. 13, to texts by Maurice Maeterlinck is the best-known.

While the influence of Brahms is evoked in Zemlinsky's early works (prompting encouragement from Brahms himself), an original voice is present from the first works on, handling dissonances in a much freer manner than Brahms. Later works adopt the kind of extended harmonies that Wagner had introduced and also reflect the influence of Mahler. In contrast to his friend Schoenberg, he never wrote atonal music, and never used the twelve-tone technique. However, some of his late works such as the Symphonische Gesänge, Sinfonietta and the third and fourth string quartets move away from post-Romanticism towards a leaner, harder-edged idiom that incorporates elements of Neue Sachlichkeit, Neoclassicism, and even jazz.

As a conductor, Zemlinsky was admired by, among others, Kurt Weill and Stravinsky, not only for his notable interpretations of Mozart, but also for his advocacy of Mahler, Schoenberg and much other contemporary music. As a teacher, his pupils included Erich Wolfgang Korngold, Hans Krása and Karl Weigl.

== See also ==
- List of compositions by Alexander von Zemlinsky
