= Antony Beaumont =

English and German musicologist, writer, conductor and violinist

- Born: 27 January 1949 (age 77); London, England
- Citizenship: Germany
- Education: University of Cambridge
- Occupations: Musicologist; writer; conductor; violinist
- Known for: Scholarship on Busoni, Zemlinsky, and Mahler; completions of Doktor Faust and Der König Kandaules

Antony Beaumont (born 27 January 1949 in London) is an English and German musicologist, writer, conductor and violinist. As a conductor, he has specialized in German music from the first half of the 20th century, including works by Zemlinsky, Weill, and Gurlitt. As a musicologist, he has published books on Busoni, Zemlinsky, and Mahler.

== Biography ==
Beaumont was born in London of Anglo-German and Greek-Romanian parentage. He studied at Cambridge, worked as a disc jockey for the BBC, wrote reviews for The Daily Telegraph, and played violin and piano as a freelance artist. At various times he played under conductors Otto Klemperer, Leopold Stokowski, and Georg Solti. After graduation he moved to Germany and became a German citizen. Beaumont has held conducting posts with orchestras in Bremen, Cologne, and Saarbrücken, and has guest conducted opera productions in England and Italy.

== Musicology ==
=== Doktor Faust ===
Beaumont has prepared new versions of the final two scenes of Busoni's unfinished opera Doktor Faust, based on newly discovered sketches. This version serves as an alternative to the completion made by Busoni's pupil, Philipp Jarnach, which was based on less detailed information. The changes in Scene 2 occur during the vision of Helen of Troy and include slightly altered text and additional music for the character of Faust such that the scene plays for approximately 39 instead of 37 minutes. In the Jarnach version of Scene 3, the final scene, Faust suffers a conventional kind of doom, dying to the accompaniment of E-flat minor chords; in the Busoni/Beaumont version Faust achieves a self-actualized resurrection: "In the freedom I have won, God and the Devil succumb." Perhaps Jarnach was uncomfortable with the morality, or perceived lack thereof, of Busoni's original intentions. The changes in Scene 3 also include additional action for Mephistopheles (he lifts the body of Faust onto his shoulders and slowly leaves the stage), and a final choral passage not found in the Jarnach version. These changes extend the scene from approximately 25 to 29 minutes. The full score of the Beaumont completion exists as a manuscript; the vocal score was published by Breitkopf and Härtel, Wiesbaden, in 1982.

The Beaumont version has not been used often in staged productions of the opera. It was premiered in Bologna in April 1985. A co-production between the English National Opera, Deutsche Oper Berlin, and the Opéra de Paris was mounted in the late 1980s. The English performances (beginning 25 April 1986) were conducted by Mark Elder and Antony Beaumont, starred Thomas Allen (Faust) and Graham Clark, and were given in the English translation by Edward J. Dent, as revised by Beaumont. This was the first staged production of the opera in Great Britain. The Zurich Opera DVD from 2006, with Thomas Hampson as Faust and conducted by Philippe Jordan, used the Jarnach version and has been severely criticized for doing so. The production at the Metropolitan Opera in 2001, with Hampson as Faust and conducted by Philippe Auguin, also used the less authentic Jarnach version.

=== Zemlinsky ===
In the late 1990s Beaumont began studying the life and music of Zemlinsky, conducting and recording several lesser known pieces (see below), and preparing a completion of Zemlinsky's unfinished opera Der König Kandaules. In addition, he wrote and published a biography of Zemlinsky in 2000, which has been widely praised.

=== Alma Mahler ===
While researching Zemlinsky's affair with Alma Schindler at the library of the American University, Beaumont found her early diaries dating from that period of her life. Beaumont edited and translated the diaries and published them in 1999. About this volume, Kirkus Reviews UK wrote:

Desolate at the end of a romance with Gustav Klimt, Alma Mahler-Werfel falls briefly in love with her piano teacher, Zemlinsky: 'so immeasurably great!' she writes dramatically. Hers was a life filled with such drama for soon she was attracted to Gustav Mahler. Mahler-Werfel was a wildly dramatic character and a charismatic beauty. Her diaries, scribbled in old exercise books, record her development from adolescence to womanhood, up to her marriage to Mahler. They provide a vivid picture of Vienna in the 1900s, with accounts of the Secession exhibitions, performances of Mahler and Bruckner symphonies, the social scene and fashions.

Further research led to Beaumont's translation and publication in 2004 of letters written by Gustav Mahler to Alma, during the period when she was Mahler's wife. Alma had published many of these letters in 1940, but they were heavily edited to present herself in the best way possible (see Alma Problem). The edition which Beaumont has translated includes these letters in unedited form and includes an additional 188 letters and other unpublished documents. "The texts, supplemented by detailed commentaries, depict an explosive relationship between two people of widely differing character and temperament. The Mahler that emerges from these authentic, unabridged sources is warm, genuine and touchingly human."

== Audio recordings (as conductor) ==
Gurlitt: Goya Symphony; 4 Dramatic Songs. Berlin Radio Symphony Orchestra. Phoenix Edition 114 (2008). OCLC 256499310.
Weill: Symphonies Nos. 1 & 2; Quodlibet, Op. 9. Deutsche Kammerphilharmonie. Chandos CHSA 5046 (2006) OCLC 70967127.
Zemlinsky: Lyric Symphony; Complete incidental music to Shakespeare's Cymbeline. Czech Philharmonic. Chandos CHAN 10069 (2003) OCLC 52524302.
Zemlinsky: Die Seejungfrau, Fantasy for Orchestra (1902-3); Symphony in D minor. Czech Philharmonic. Chandos CHAN 10138 (2003) (includes [www.theclassicalshop.net/download_booklet.aspx?file=CHAN%205022.pdf downloadable CD booklet with an essay by Antony Beaumont], accessed on 14 August 2010) OCLC 54432393.
Zemlinsky: Symphony in B flat; Prelude to Es war einmal... (Original version, 1899); Sinfonietta, Op. 23 (1934); Prelude to Act II of Der König Kandaules (1936). Czech Philharmonic. Chandos CHAN 10204 (2004) OCLC 56360770; previously issued on Nimbus (2001) OCLC 50442560.

== Publications ==
Note: This list of publications is not comprehensive.

- Beaumont, Antony, Busoni the Composer, Faber and Faber, London, 1985. ISBN 0-571-13149-2
- Beaumont, Antony, ed., Busoni: Selected Letters, Columbia University Press, New York, 1987. ISBN 0-231-06460-8
- Beaumont, Antony & Susanne Rode-Breymann, eds. & trans., Alma Mahler-Werfel, Diaries 1898-1902, Faber and Faber, London, 1999. ISBN 0-571-19340-4
- Beaumont, Antony, Zemlinsky, Faber and Faber, London, 2000. ISBN 0-571-16983-X
- La Grange, Henry-Louis de, Günther Weiss, & Knud Martner, eds., Gustav Mahler, Letters to his Wife [1901-11] (First complete edition, rev. & trans. by Antony Beaumont) Faber and Faber, London, 2004. ISBN 0-8014-4340-7. Accessed on 3 February 2009.
