= Chalk Circle (disambiguation) =

Chalk Circle may refer to:

- The Chalk Circle, a Chinese play
- The Augsburg Chalk Circle, a German short story
- The Caucasian Chalk Circle, a German play
- Der Kreidekreis (The Chalk Circle), a German play by Klabund
  - Der Kreidekreis (opera), an opera by Alexander von Zemlinsky after the play by Klabund
- Chalk Circle (Canadian band), a Canadian alternative rock band
- Chalk Circle (American band), an American punk rock band
