= Fehringer =

Fehringer is a surname of South German origin. Notable people with the surname include:

- Franz Fehringer (1910–1988), German operatic tenor
- Hermann Fehringer (born 1962), Austrian pole vaulter
