= The Augsburg Chalk Circle =

"The Augsburg Chalk Circle" (German: Der Augsburger Kreidekreis) is a short story written in 1940 by Bertolt Brecht. The story derives from The Chalk Circle, a 14th-century play by Li Xingdao, and can be seen as a "first draft" for Brecht's subsequent play, The Caucasian Chalk Circle.

== Plot ==
=== Summary ===
The story is set during the Thirty Years War. Zingli, a Protestant of means, delays leaving his home in Augsburg until the Catholic forces are plundering the city. His wife spends too much time packing her clothes, and so is forced to flee emptyhanded, leaving the child behind. Their maid, Anna, a simple girl, rescues the child and flees to her brother's farm in the country.

To avoid humiliation as an unwed mother, Anna claims that she is waiting for her husband to return for her. Given the nature of the war, the ruse is plausible for a time, but eventually, to avoid suspicion and possible eviction, she feels compelled to produce a husband. She marries a man who is on his deathbed, expecting to be a widow soon; however, he recovers and she must live with him for a few years.

When the war ends, Frau Zingli returns to reclaim her son. Ignatz Dollinger, a wise judge, cannot determine who is the real mother, so enacts a version of the Judgment of Solomon. The child is placed inside a chalk circle with two ropes tied around him: one in the hands of each claimant. Anna is unwilling to risk harm to the child, so pulls only lightly, while Frau Zingli pulls with force that could have "ripped the child in two." Although Anna appears to have lost the contest, the wise judge rules that, having shown the greater love, Anna is the fit and rightful mother.

=== Differences from the original ===
While the essential form of the story and its resolution remain the same as in the original play, there are several important differences. Most obviously, the setting is changed from Imperial China to Germany, but the period chosen (the greatest civil war in the turbulent history of that country) has important consequences for the story.

Notably:

- The cause of the conflict is not personal (jealousy), but political (the division between Catholics and Protestants).
- The heroine must engage in a deception to preserve her status in the community.
- The nature of the heroine's claim on the child is changed from biological mother to de facto adoption.
- The just reason to deny the wife's claim is changed from lack of biological status to neglect: she loses control of the child because she is more concerned with her clothes than with her maternal duty.
- The Imperial intervention at the end of the story becomes unnecessary and out of place, and is therefore dropped.
