= Judgement of Solomon (Mantegna) =

1495 painting by workshop of Andrea Mantegna

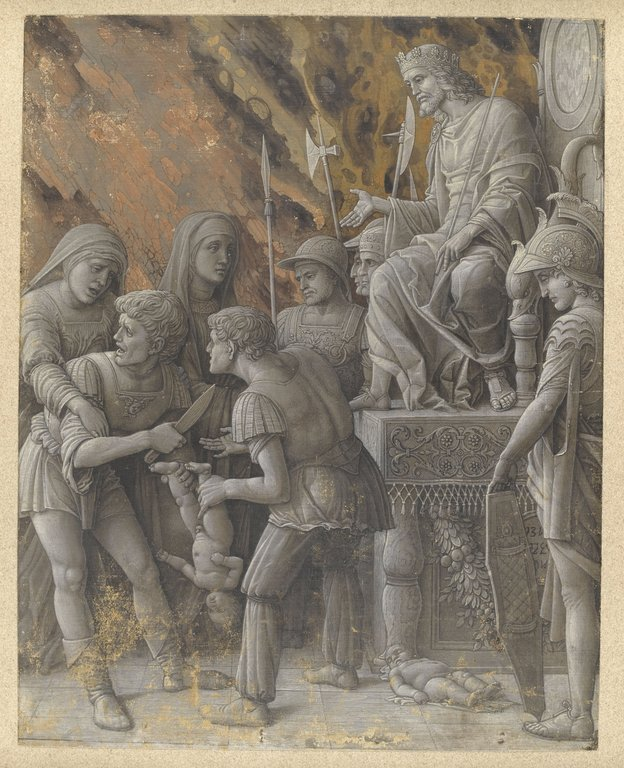
- Artist: workshop of Andrea Mantegna
- Year: 1460
- Medium: tempera on canvas
- Dimensions: 46.5 cm × 37 cm (18.3 in × 15 in)
- Location: Louvre, Paris

Judgement of Solomon is a tempera on canvas painting of the Judgement of Solomon attributed to Andrea Mantegna and his collaborators. Dating to around c. 1500, the painting is now in the Louvre,

Judgement is in the grisaille style imitating a marble bas-relief. The only surviving preparatory drawing may be in Mantegna's own hand.

== Bibliography ==
- (in Italian) Mauro Lucco (ed), Mantegna a Mantova 1460-1506, catalogo della mostra, Skira Milano, 2006.
