= Der Kreidekreis (opera) =

Opera in three acts by Alexander von Zemlinsky

- Opera by Alexander von Zemlinsky
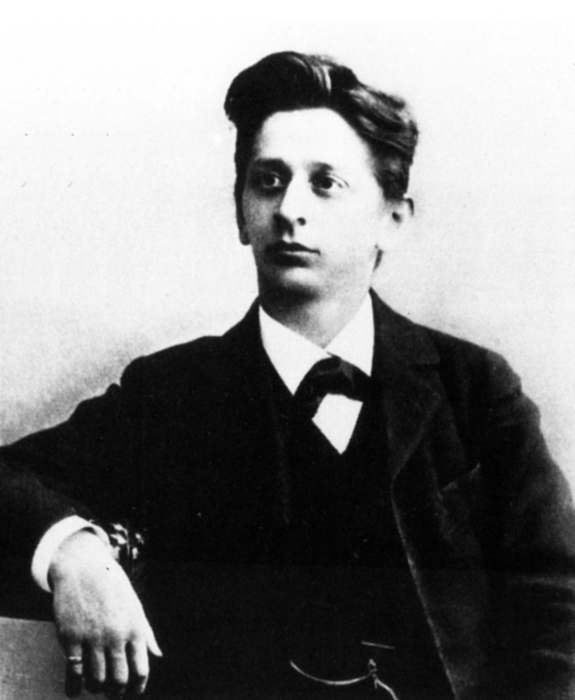
- The composer in 1908
- Translation: The Chalk Circle
- Librettist: Zemlinsky
- Language: German
- Based on: Der Kreidekreis by Klabund
- Premiere: 14 October 1933; Zürich Opera House

Der Kreidekreis (Op. 21), is an opera in three acts by Alexander von Zemlinsky to a libretto by the composer after the play Der Kreidekreis by Klabund – a telling of the Chalk Circle story. The opera was written during 1930-31 and premiered on 14 October 1933 in the Zürich Opera House. Among the singers were Artūrs Cavara, Maria Madlen Madsen Maria Bernhard-Ulbrich; Fred Destal, Georg Oeggl and Peter Klein; it was directed by Karl Schmid-Bloß and the stage design was by Roman Clemens.

It was planned to premiere the work simultaneously on four German stages: Frankfurt, Berlin, Cologne, and Nuremberg. Because of Zemlinsky's Jewish ancestry, this became impossible when the Nazis came to power early in 1933. Nevertheless, the work was performed in January 1934 in Stettin, Coburg, Berlin and Nuremberg, and in Graz in February due to the temporary lifting of certain restrictions. The work was also performed in Prague and Bratislava.

Zürich Opera revived the opera in 2003. A new production was staged at the Opera de Lyon in January 2018 directed by Richard Brunel and conducted by Lothar Koenigs.

== Roles ==
Role	Voice type	Premiere cast, 14 October 1933 Conductor: Robert Kolisko
Tchang-Haitang, a tea house girl, second wife of Ma	soprano	Maria Madlen Madsen
Yü-Pei, First Wife of Ma	mezzo-soprano	Maria Bernhard-Ulbrich
Ma, the tax collector	bass	Fred Destal
Prince Pao, honest official	tenor	Artūrs Cavara
Tschu-tschu, a dishonest judge	bass	
Tschao, law court official	bass-baritone	
Tong, marriage broker	tenor	
Tschang-Ling, brother	baritone	Georg Oeggl
Mrs Tschang	contralto	
Hebamme (midwife)	mezzo-soprano	
Ein Mädchen (a girl)	soprano	
2 Kulis, court clerks, police, soldiers, flower girls, a master of ceremonies

== Synopsis ==
=== Act 1 ===
Tong, a former executioner, is the proprietor of a house of ill repute. He is visited by Mrs Chang and her daughter Haitang: Mrs Chang must sell her daughter into prostitution following the death of her husband, who, a victim of extortion by the evil and unscrupulous tax collector Ma, has committed suicide leaving the family penniless. Her son, Chang-Ling, a political revolutionary, objects, but after some haggling over the price, Haitang is admitted to the brothel. A customer, Prince Pao, is entranced by Haitang. She draws a chalk circle on the paper wall, symbolic of the wheel of fate. Ma's head unexpectedly bursts through the paper circle: he desires Haitang for himself and purchases her from Tong for a price with which Pao is unable to compete.

=== Act 2 ===
Ma’s first wife, Yü-Pei, is furious and humiliated over Haitang’s appearance in the household. Haitang has borne Ma a son while Yü-Pei has remained childless which legally entitles Haitang to Ma’s inheritance. Yü-Pei conspires with her lover, Chow, to murder Ma. The destitute Chang-Ling reappears at the garden gate: he has joined a revolutionary group which has decreed that the villainous Ma must die. Haitang explains that she has borne Ma’s child and her husband has become a changed person as a result. After consulting the chalk circle, Chang-Ling agrees to defer the execution. Haitang gives Chang-Ling her coat, observed by Yü-Pei who promptly informs Ma, accusing Haiting of consorting with beggars. Yü-Pei slips poison into Ma’s tea and he collapses on the spot. Haitang is arrested for the murder and Yü-Pei claims the child as hers.

=== Act 3 ===
The corrupt judge, Chu-Chu, has been bribed by Chow while Yü-Pei has bribed the midwife, Mrs Lien, and two fake witnesses to testify against Haitang. Haitang is duly sentenced for the murder of Ma. News arrives that Prince Pao has been crowned Emperor and, as an act of goodwill, has declared an amnesty for all condemned prisoners. Chang-Ling shouts from the gallery that the new Emperor will be no different to the old one and he is also sentenced. Haitang and Chang-Ling are escorted by two unsympathetic soldiers in a snow-storm to Peking where they must appear before the new Emperor. Pao sympathises with the views of Chang-Ling and reprieves him. He orders the child to be placed in the middle of a chalk circle and the two women are told to pull the child out: the child will be handed to whoever pulls the hardest. Unable to harm her son, Haitang reveals herself to be the true mother. Yü-Pei, Chow and Chu are led off for sentencing. As she is about to leave, Haitang reveals to Pao that she had a dream in which he had had sex with her while she slept during her first night in Ma’s house. Pao tells her that it was no dream and Haitang tells him the child must therefore be his. Pao proclaims Haitang his wife and she is crowned empress.

== Instrumentation ==
- 2 flutes, piccolo (doubling flute 3), 2 oboes, English horn, 2 clarinets in B♭/A (2nd doubling E♭ clarinet), bass clarinet, alto saxophone (doubling tenor saxophone), 2 bassoons (2nd doubling contrabassoon)
- 4 horns, 3 trumpets, 3 trombones, bass tuba
- timpani, percussion, harp, celesta, banjo (doubling guitar and mandoline)
- strings

Onstage music: flute, harp, tambourine

== Recording ==
- 1991 (re-issued 2013): Renate Behle (soprano), Gabriele Schreckenbach (alto), Bengt-Ola Morgny (tenor), Roland Hermann (baritone), Gidon Saks (baritone), Reiner Goldberg (tenor), Warren Mok (tenor), Hans Helm (baritone), Celina Lindsley (soprano), Siegfried Lorenz (baritone), Gertrud Ottenthal (soprano), Kaja Borris (alto), Peter Matić (narrator), Uwe Peter (tenor); Radio-Sinfonie-Orchester Berlin, Stefan Soltesz. Capriccio C5190
