= Carola Neher =

German actress and singer (1900–1942)

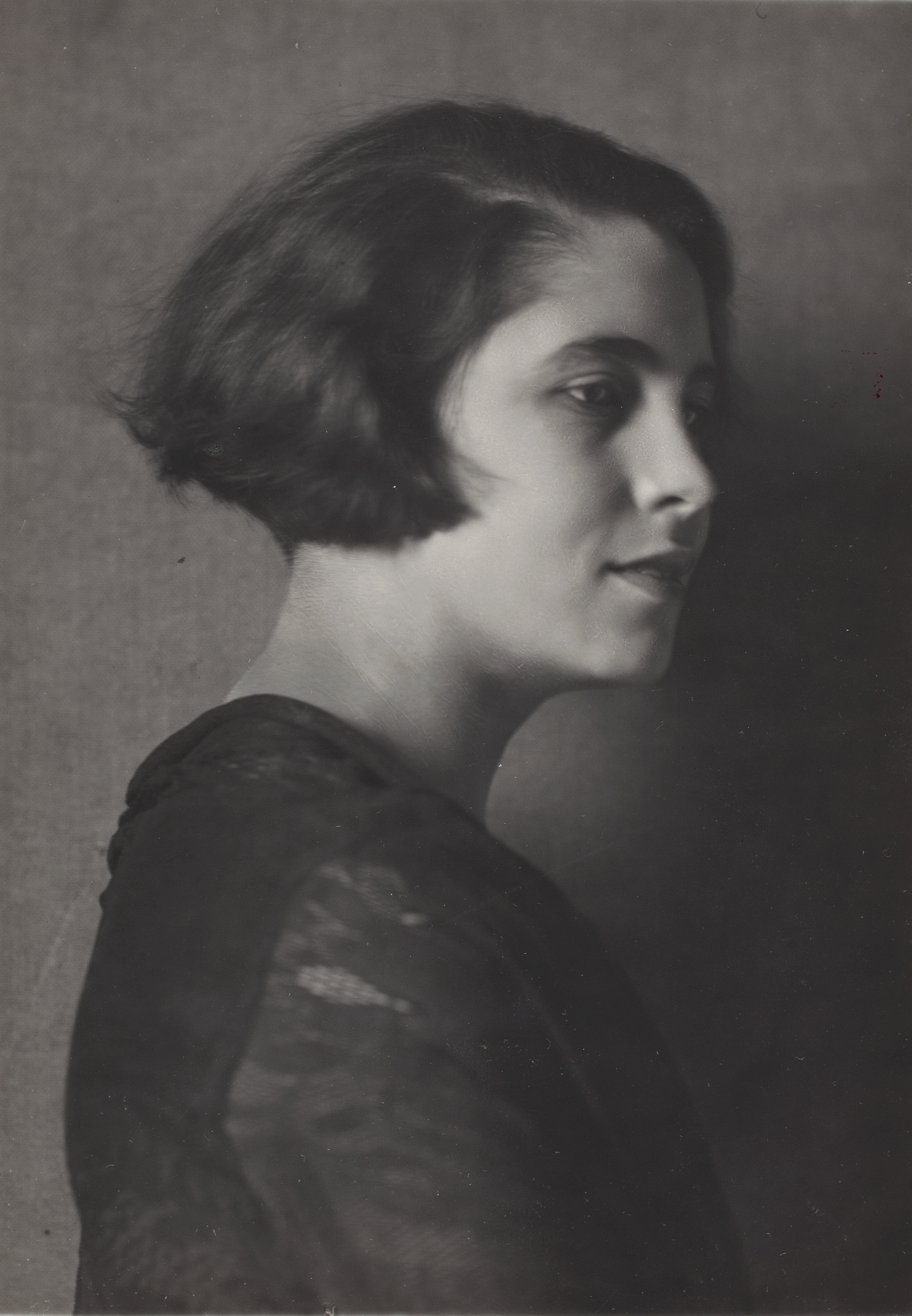
- Born: 2 November 1900; Munich, Bavaria, Germany
- Died: 26 June 1942 (aged 41); NKVD Prison No. 2, Sol-Iletsk, Russian SFSR, Soviet Union
- Other name: Karola Neher
- Occupations: Actress, singer
- Years active: 1920–1931
- Spouses: Alfred Henschke (m. 1925; died 1928); Anatol Becker (m. 1932; executed 1937)
- Children: Georg

Carola Neher (born Karoline Neher; 2 November 1900 – 26 June 1942) was a German actress and singer.

== Biography ==
Neher was born in Munich in 1900. She worked as a bank clerk at the Munich branch of the Deutsche Bank from 11 June 1917 to 15 October 1919. In the summer of 1920, she made her debut performance at the Baden-Baden theater without a specific stage education, later also working at the theaters of Darmstadt, Nuremberg and at the Munich Kammerspiele. In 1920 and 1921, she worked with Therese Giehse and Peter Lorre. In 1924, Neher started to work at the Lobe-Theater Breslau.

On 7 May 1925 she married Alfred Henschke (the poet Klabund), who had followed her from Munich to Breslau, at that time already a well known and successful poet. The first performance of his Circle of Chalk ("Der Kreidekreis") turned into her first great success.

In 1926, Neher went to Berlin to work with Bertolt Brecht. He wrote the role of Polly Peachum in The Threepenny Opera for her, but late in rehearsals her husband died at Davos on 14 August 1928. She was therefore unable to appear at the premiere, but acted the role of Polly in the later performances. Brecht wrote several roles for her, such as Lilian Holiday in Happy End and the title role in his Saint Joan of the Stockyards. She enjoyed success as Marianne in Ödön von Horváth's Tales from the Vienna Woods (play), and embodied and immortalized Polly in G.W. Pabst's 1931 film version of The Threepenny Opera. At this time, Brecht wrote a poem about Neher, admiring her skill and beauty while advising her on how to rehearse.

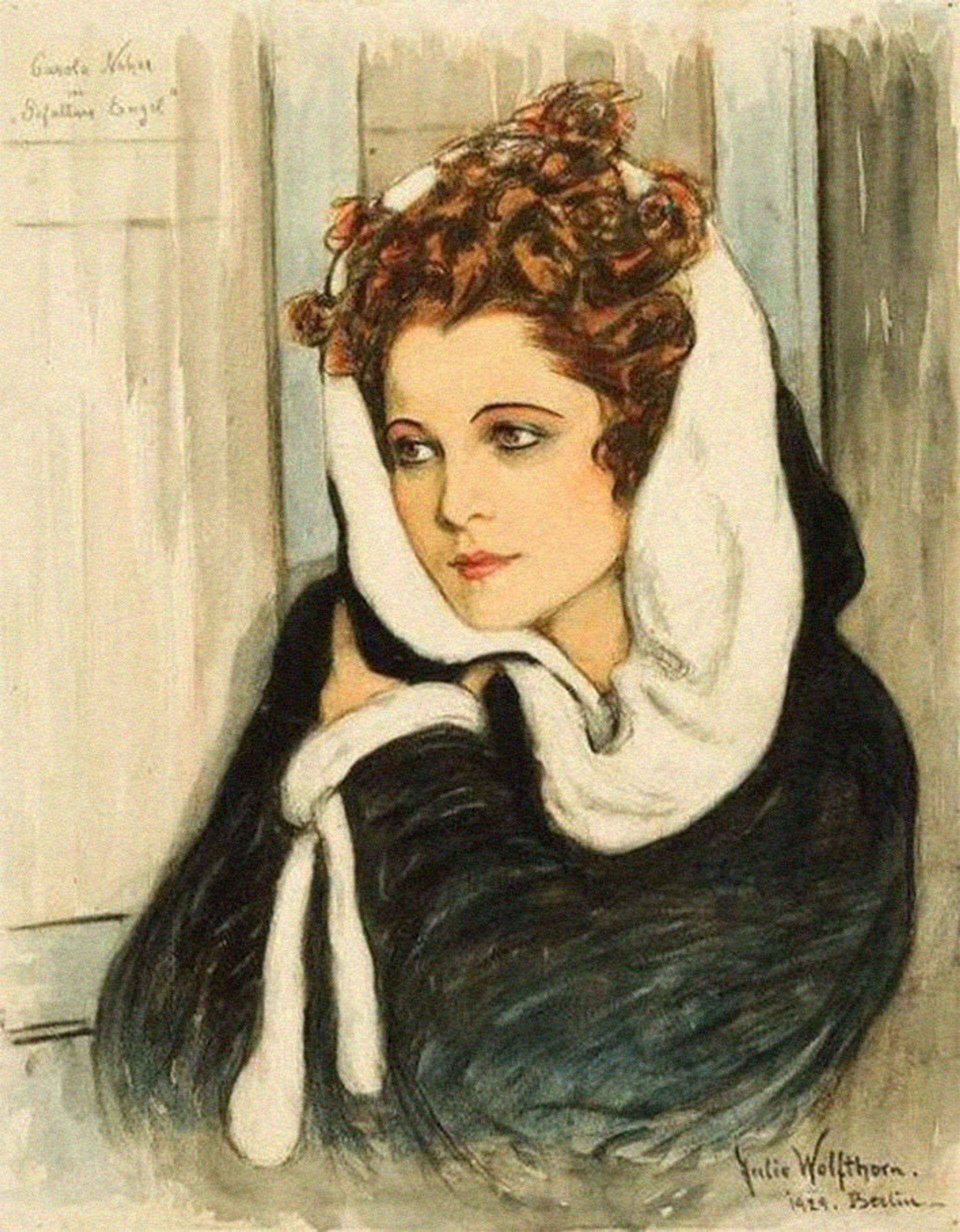
Portrait of Neher, by Julie Wolfthorn (1929)

While in Berlin, she practiced boxing with Turkish trainer and prizefighter Sabri Mahir at his studio, which opened to women (including Vicki Baum and Marlene Dietrich) in the 1920s. Posing for a photograph opposite Mahir and equipped with boxing gloves and a maillot, she asserted herself as a "New Woman", challenging traditional gender categories.

In 1932 she married Anatol Becker, a German-speaking engineer and Communist from Bessarabia (now part of Romania). The couple left Germany in spring 1933 after Adolf Hitler's ascension to power in January, and emigrated to Prague, where Neher worked at the New German Theater, but went on to the Soviet Union in 1934. In Moscow, she met other German leftist exiles such as Gustav von Wangenheim with whom she worked at his cabaret Kolonne Links and Erwin Piscator, with whom she worked training German exiles for theatre roles. She also associated with other German exiles, such as the doctor-playwright Friedrich Wolf, and arranged a reading of Brecht's work when he visited Moscow in 1935.

In 1936, during the Great Purge, Wangenheim denounced Neher and Becker as Trotskyites. Neher was arrested after Becker on 25 July 1936. When Brecht found out that Neher had been arrested, he wrote letters to German leftists whom he hoped were close enough to Moscow to intervene on her behalf, such as Lion Feuchtwanger, who would later publish an enthusiastic account of his meeting with Stalin. There is however no record that Feuchtwanger was able to confirm her fate. Brecht's response was to revise the poem that he had written in Neher's honor in 1930 to add another verse that begins, in English translation, "Now I hear you are in prison/The letters that I wrote on your behalf/ Remain unanswered." Becker was executed in 1937, while Neher was sentenced to ten years in prison and sent to the Prison for political convicts in Oryol.

She is mentioned in the memoirs both of Yevgenia Ginzburg (as Carola Henschke) and Margarete Buber-Neumann. Buber-Neumann, whom the Soviets included in a prisoner exchange with the Nazis, as part of the NKVD-Gestapo cooperation initiated by Ribbentrop-Molotov Pact, sent to Moscow on her transit to Germany where she met Neher in Butyrka prison. Buber was transferred to Germany and spent the rest of the war in Ravensbrück Concentration Camp, but Neher, who had been in Soviet custody since 1936, was returned to the Oryol prison.

As the German army approached Oryol in October 1941, she was transferred to NKVD Prison No. 2 near Orenburg, where she died of typhus on 26 June 1942, aged 41. Neher (prisoner number 59783) was buried in an unmarked mass grave. Her son, Georg (born in December 1934), became a music teacher and only found out about his parents' identity in 1975, after the Soviet Union exonerated them.

== Legacy ==
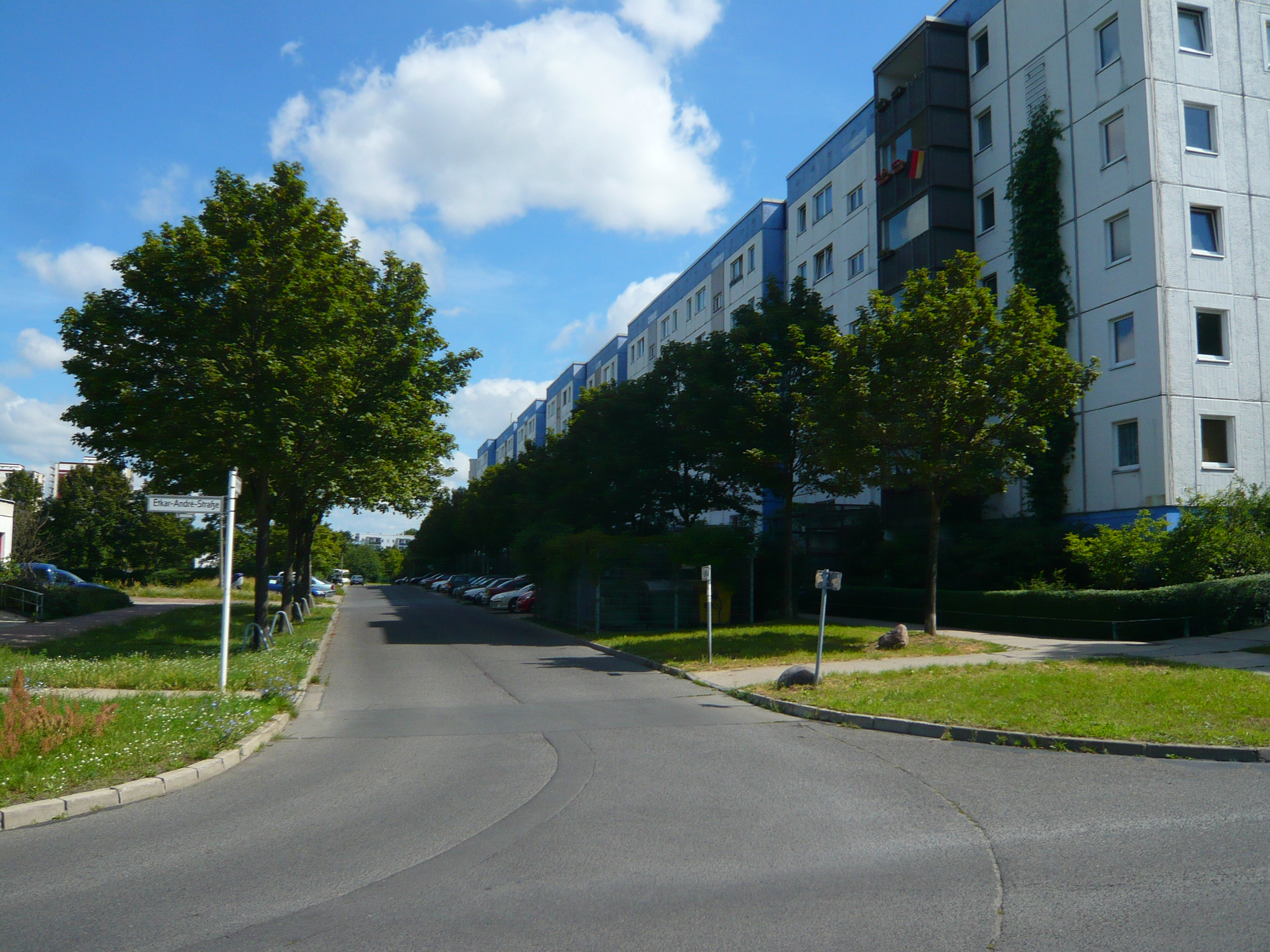
Carola Neher Str Hellersdorf

- Bertolt Brecht wrote three versions of a poem "Advice to an actress C.N," in 1930, 1937, and 1956. The longest, from 1937, has two verses: the first salutes Neher and her skill as an actress; the second laments that she "is in prison" and that his letters on her behalf went "unanswered."
- The Carola-Neher-Street in Berlin Hellersdorf, in former East Berlin, was renamed to honor Neher in 1992. While many major Berlin thoroughfares reverted after unification to names dating from the 19th century Second Reich, this change notably honored a dissident communist actress.
- In 1995, the Spanish-French writer Jorge Semprún, who spent nearly two years at the Buchenwald Concentration Camp, responded to a commission by director Klaus Michael Grüber to write a play commemorating the liberation of Buchenwald in April 1945. The result was a play that Semprún wrote in French about Carola Neher called Le Retour de Carola Neher. Grüber staged it at the Soviet war cemetery at Ettersburg under the German title Bleiche Mutter, Zarte Schwester, a title that alludes second to Brecht's poem about Neher, after the better-known poem "Germany, Pale Mother".
- On 5 February 2017, a Last Address commemorative plaque to Carola Neher was affixed to 36 Krasnoprudnaya Street, Moscow.

== Literature ==
- Matthias Wegner: Klabund und Carola Neher: Eine Geschichte von Liebe und Tod. Rowohlt, Reinbek bei Hamburg 1996. ISBN 3-87134-266-1
- Tita Gaehme: Dem Traum folgen. Das Leben der Schauspielerin Carola Neher und ihre Liebe zu Klabund.. Dittrich, Köln 1996. ISBN 3-920862-11-2.
- Guido von Kaulla: Und verbrenn in seinem Herzen: Die Schauspielerin Carola Neher und Klabund. Herder, Freiburg/Br. 1984
- Michaela Karl: "Carola Neher: Die Silberfüchsin". In Bayerische Amazonen – 12 Porträts. Pustet, Regensburg 2004. ISBN 3-7917-1868-1. S. 168–189
