= The Judgement of Solomon =

Painting by Frans Floris

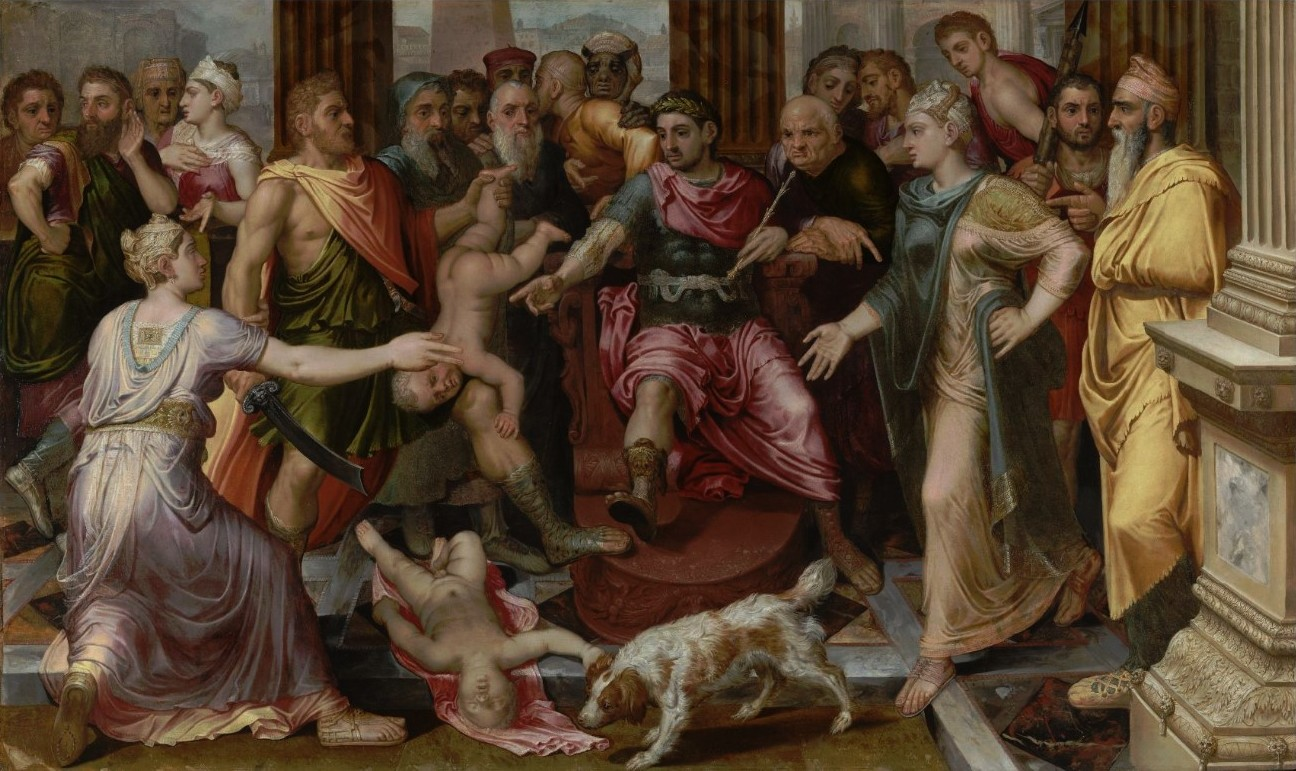
- Artist: Frans Floris
- Year: ca. 1547
- Catalogue: 663
- Medium: Oil on panel
- Dimensions: 123 cm × 208 cm (48.4 in × 81.9 in)
- Location: Royal Museum of Fine Arts Antwerp, Antwerp

The Judgement of Solomon is an oil on panel painting by Flemish painter Frans Floris. Painted right after Floris' return from his trip to Italy, the painting depicts a biblical scene, the Judgement of Solomon. In that story, King Solomon of Israel ruled between two women who both claimed to be the mother of a child. Solomon revealed their true feelings and relationship to the child by suggesting that the baby be cut in two, with each woman to receive half. With this strategy, Solomon was able to determine the non-mother as the woman who backed this proposal (saying "It shall be neither mine nor thine; divide it"), while the actual mother begged that the sword be sheathed and the child committed to the care of her rival ("O my lord, give her the living child, and by no means kill him!").

== Painting ==
In Antwerp there was a similar work by Jan Massijs, but it was destroyed during one of the Spanish Furies, which devastated the city of Antwerp in 1576. Afterwards, Jan van Asseliers donated The Judgment of Solomon by Frans Floris as a replacement to Antwerp's City Hall (whose design is generally attributed to Floris' brother, Cornelis Floris).

The painting is one of the earliest works by Floris after his return from Italy. This is reflected in the attention to details and clothing. The story, from the Old Testament, is moved to ancient Rome. Typical of Floris' early work is the overcrowded composition with figures that are rather stiffly next to each other in the foreground without any openings to the depth. They have an unmoved facial expression with no individual characteristics.

Solomon's palace is in the form of a colonnaded hall overlooking ancient ruins. The figures were inspired by Raphael, with whom Frans Floris became acquainted in Rome. The painter tried to reproduce the ancient architecture and clothing as accurately as possible on the basis of his studies from Italian albums of drawings. From thence the dating of the painting to 1545–1550 (ca. 1547), when the artist had just returned from Rome.

The painting is currently housed at the Royal Museum of Fine Arts in Antwerp.
