= Maria Madlen Madsen =

German opera singer

Maria Madlen Madsen (23 March 1905 – 23 March 1990), temporarily also under the stage name Gerda Hansi, was a German operatic soprano, theatre, film and television actress.

== Life ==
=== Training period ===
Born in Krefeld, Madsen grew up in Hamburg, went to school there and studied classical singing with Robert Dähmke for four years. Under the stage name Gerda Hansi she first worked between 1926 and 1929 as a program employee (singer) for the Süddeutscher Rundfunk and became known there as the "Schwäbische Nachtigall" (Swabian Nightingale). She also took part in a new form of broadcasting which was popular among the listeners at the time, the Stadt-Portraits presented as a radio play. Parallel to this she was taught in Stuttgart by the pedagogue Daimler.

=== Career ===
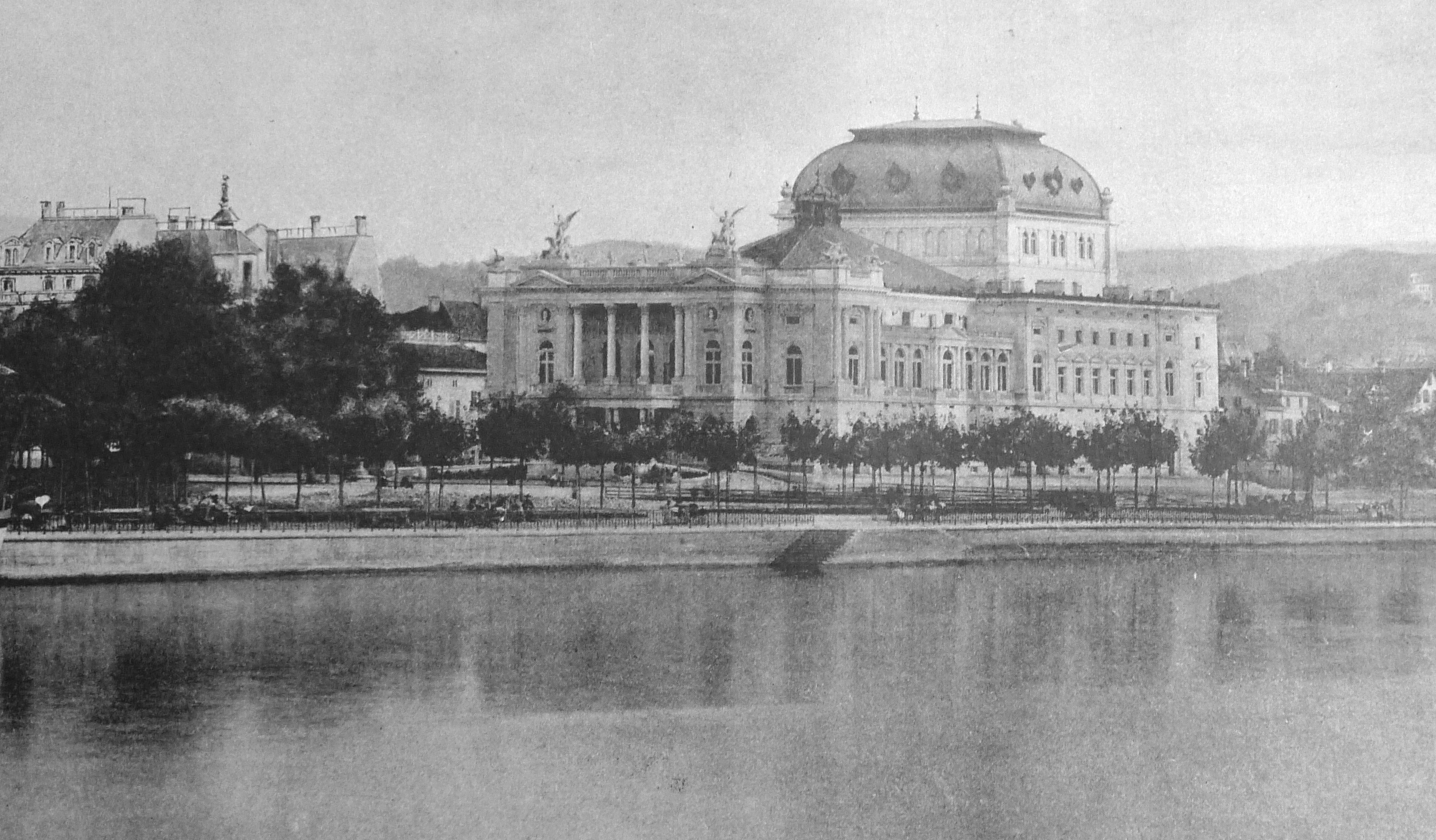
Maria Madlen Madsen was engaged at the Stadttheater Zurich between 1929 and 1934.

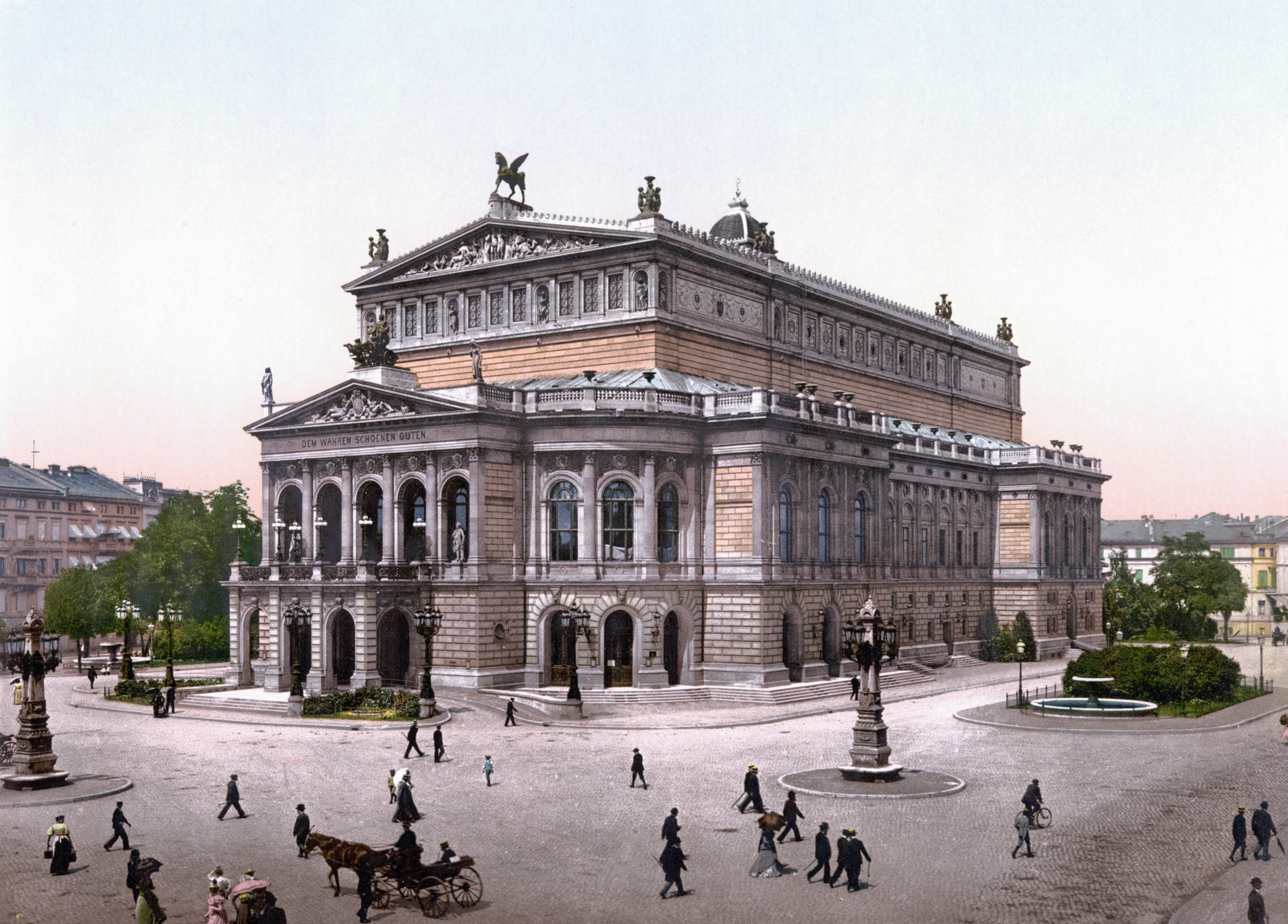
The Frankfurt Opera was the stage for Maria Madlen Madsen's singing career from 1934 onwards.

From 1929 to 1934, she was engaged by the Opernhaus Zürich in Switzerland, where she took part in the premiere of Zemlinsky's Der Kreidekreis in 1933. From 1934, she was engaged by the Oper Frankfurt. For Madsen began a twelve-year lasting great career in the Third Reich as coloratura-soubrette. She participated in the premiere of Werner Egk's Die Zaubergeige on 22 May 1935 as Gretl and in the premiere of Carl Orff's Carmina Burana on 8 June 1937 as a soloist.

Guest performances led Madsen to the Berlin State Opera, Breslau, Semperoper Dresden, Hamburg State Opera, Bavarian State Opera Munich and Staatstheater Stuttgart, abroad in the Gran Teatre del Liceu Barcelona, Belgrade, Bologna and Paris Opera.

After the Second World War Madsen was engaged by Radio Frankfurt (later Hessischer Rundfunk) for archive and studio productions. During this time, she worked with Trude Eipperle, Franz Fehringer, Ferdinand Frantz, Karl Friedrich, Otto von Rohr, Helge Rosvaenge, Heinrich Schlusnus, Erik Schumann, Georg Stern and Günther Treptow, among others.

She was preferably cast for comic stage roles such as Despina in Mozart's Così fan tutte, Zerline in Don Giovanni, Blondchen in Die Entführung aus dem Serail, Marzelline in Beethoven's Fidelio, Ännchen in Weber's Der Freischütz, Marie in Lortzing's Zar und Zimmermann, Frau Fluth in Adam's Der Postillon von Lonjumeau, Musetta in Puccini's La Bohème, Adele in Strauss II's Die Fledermaus and as Christel in Zeller's Der Vogelhändler.

She became known and highly esteemed as a concert and lieder singer. In the early 1950s she also sang popular songs on Hessischer Rundfunk radio.

=== Plays ===
From the second half of the 1950s, she was cast as an actress for mainly comic roles, e.g. in the Frankfurt Kleinen Theater im Zoo (today: Fritz Rémond Theater), but also in German Television. After the end of her singing career she gave lessons in voice training to young singers in Frankfurt am Main from 1963.

=== Radio ===
After her activity as a singing program assistant for the Süddeutscher Rundfunk between 1926 and 1929, Madsen was active as a radio announcer in the 1960s and took on roles in radio dramas.

Madsen died in Frankfurt on her 85th birthday.

== Filmography ==
- 1956: Herr Hesselbach und die Firma
- 1956: Der Verräter
- 1958: Der Dank der Unterwelt
- 1959: Kopfgeld
- 1959: Ein unbeschriebenes Blatt
- 1960: Die Friedhöfe
- 1967: Die Namenstagfeier (1967)
