= The Test of Fire of Moses (Giorgione) =

Painting by Giorgione

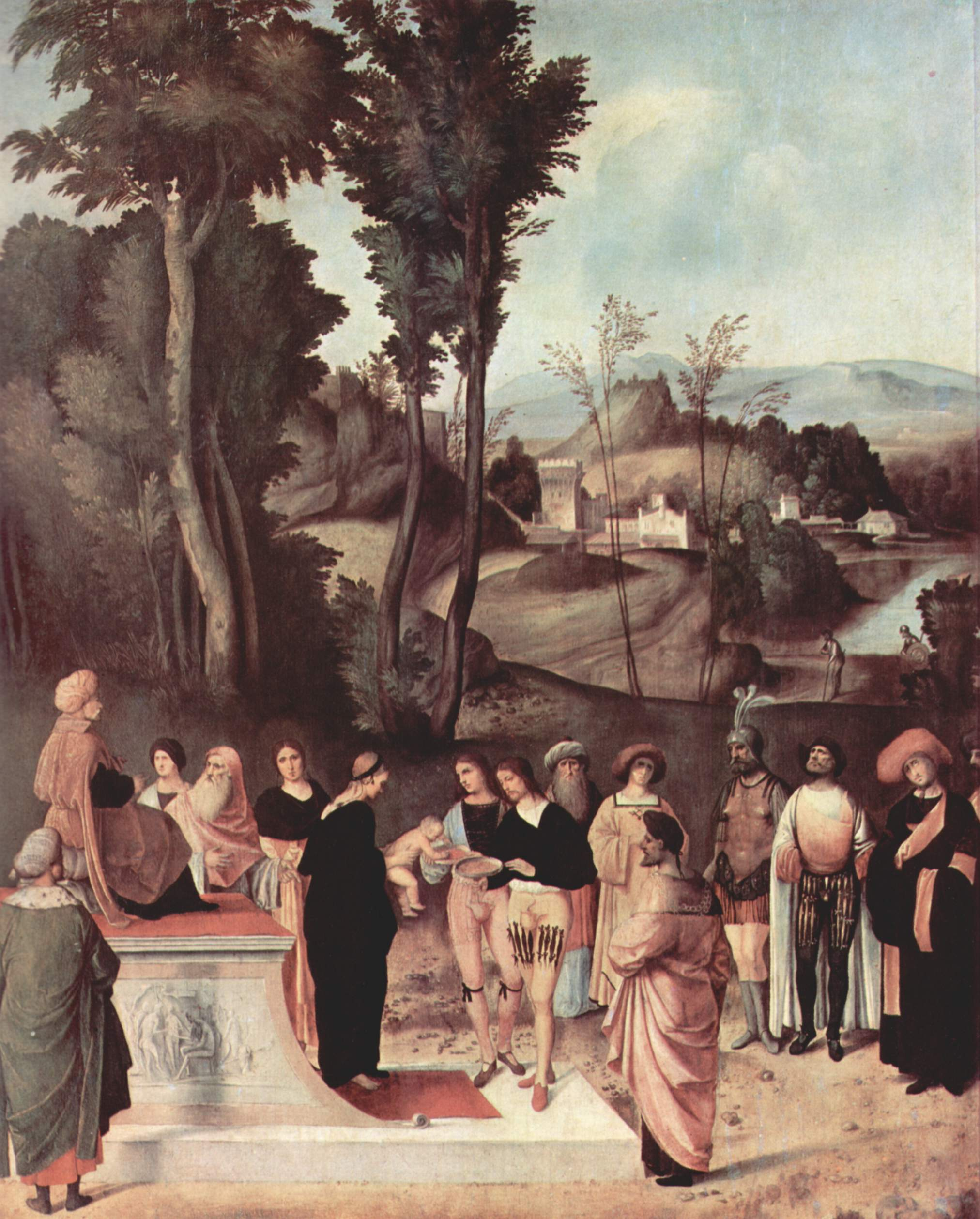
- Artist: Giorgione
- Year: c. 1502-1505
- Medium: Oil on panel
- Dimensions: 89 cm × 72 cm (35 in × 28 in)
- Location: Uffizi, Florence

The Test of Fire of Moses is a painting by the Italian Renaissance master Giorgione created c. 1502–1505. It is housed in the Galleria degli Uffizi of Florence.

The work is dimensionally and thematically similar to its Pendant painting The Judgement of Solomon, also in the Uffizi, and is dated to the years immediately after Giorgione's moving to Venice.

The episode is taken from the Talmud, and was probably commissioned by an acculturated person who was not entirely following to the official Roman Catholic positions.

The horizontal setting is similar to that in Giovanni Bellini's Holy Allegory, also in the Uffizi, and allows the painter to give importance to the landscape. In the latter's care for detail are evident influences from Northern Europe painting.
