= The Judgement of Solomon (Giorgione) =

Painting by Giorgione

The Judgment of Solomon
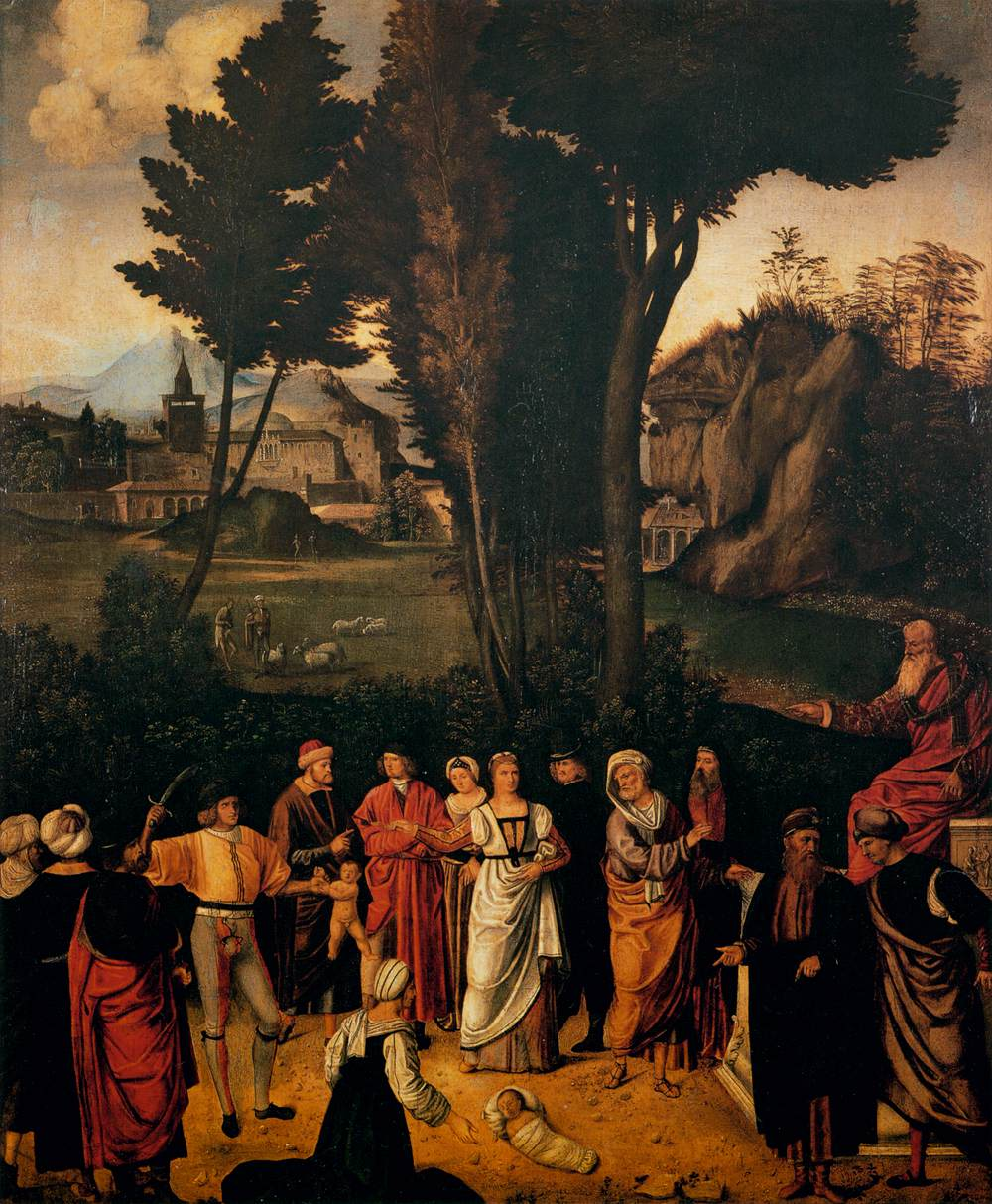
- Artist: Giorgione
- Year: c. 1502-1505
- Medium: Oil on panel
- Dimensions: 89 cm × 72 cm (35 in × 28 in)
- Location: Uffizi, Florence

The Judgment of Solomon is a painting by the Italian Renaissance master Giorgione of the Judgement of Solomon created c. 1502–1505. It is housed in the Galleria degli Uffizi of Florence.

The work is dimensionally and thematically similar to its Pendant painting Test of Fire of Moses, also in the Uffizi. It shows Solomon, King of the Jews, on the throne, with the court dignitaries and two women at his feet. The two women were both claiming the same child and had appealed to the King. Solomon's choice unmasked the faking one. Behind them are two large oaks which divide the landscape into two parts.

A Ferrarese assistant collaborated with Giorgione in the realization of the figures.

== See also ==
- Judgment of Solomon
