= Judgement of Solomon =

Story from the Old Testament

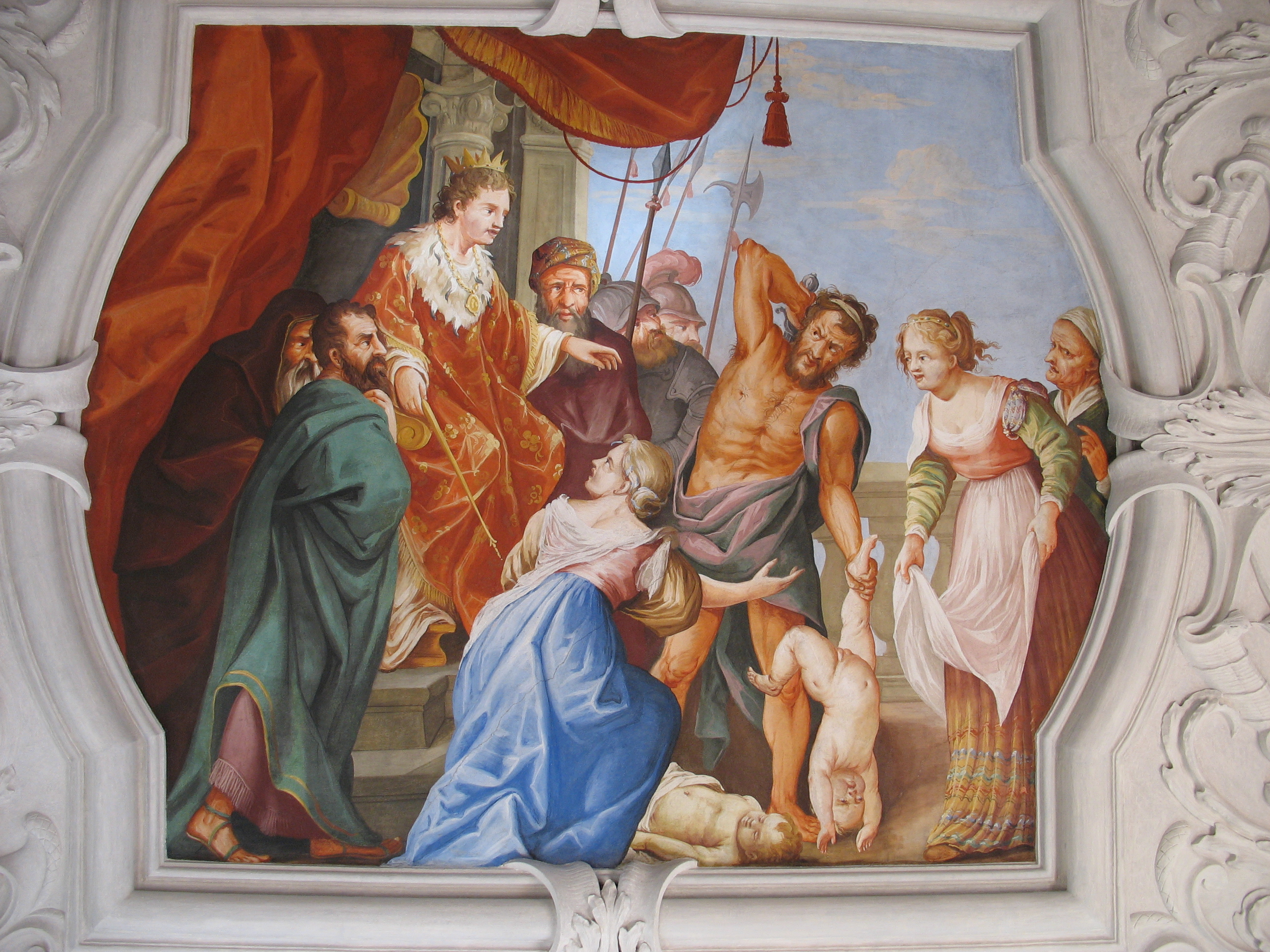
Fresco of the Judgment of Solomon, Frauenberg, Styria

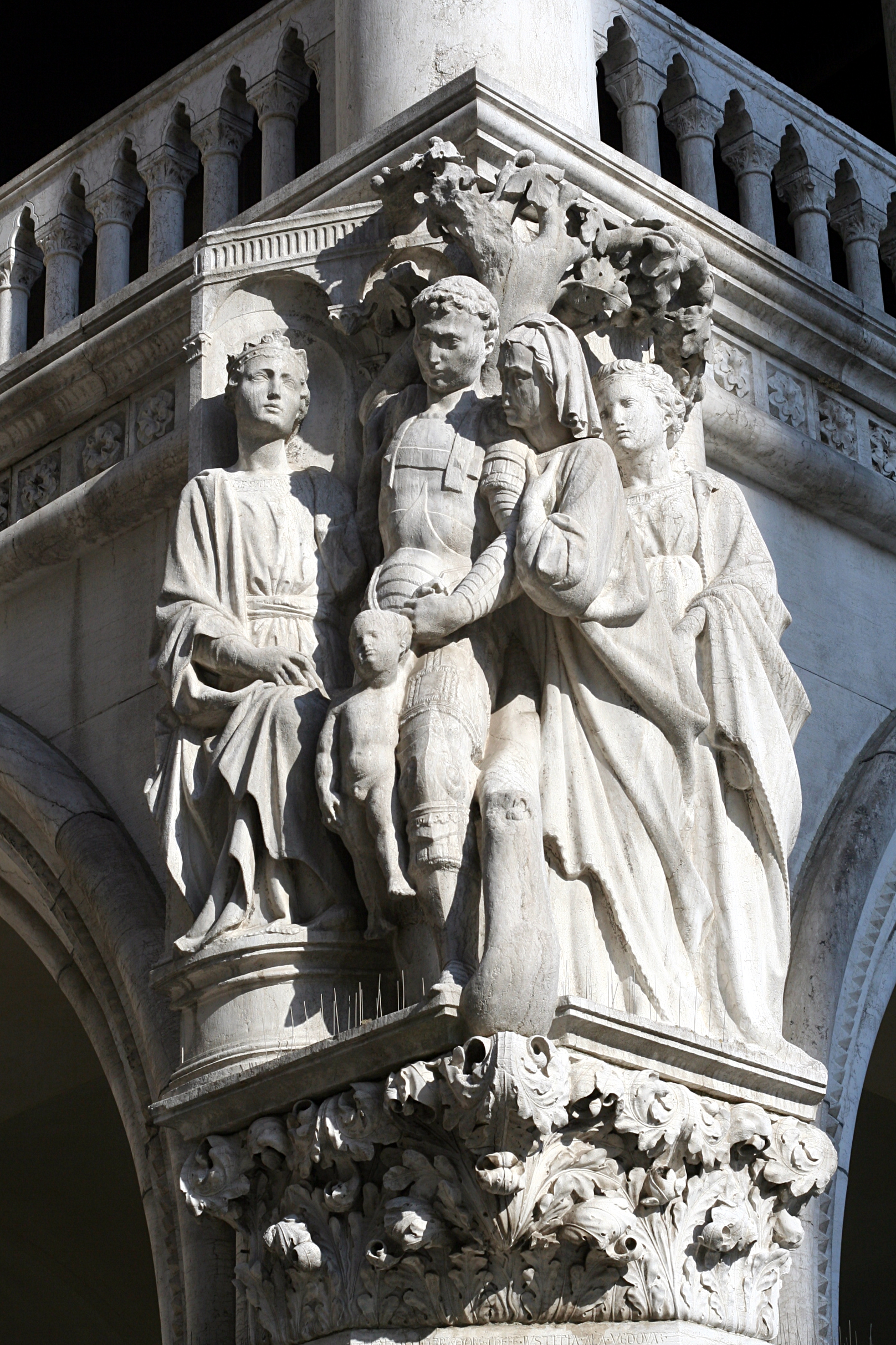
Sculpture given either to Pietro Lamberti or to Nanni di Bartolo. It stands at the corner of the Doge's Palace in Venice (Italy), next to Porta della Carta

The Judgement of Solomon is a story from the Book of Kings in which Solomon ruled between two women who both claimed to be the mother of a child. Solomon ordered the baby be cut in half, with each woman to receive one half. The first woman accepted the compromise as fair, but the second begged Solomon to give the baby to her rival, preferring the baby to live, even without her. Solomon ordered the baby given to the second woman, as her love was selfless, as opposed to the first woman's selfish disregard for the baby's actual well-being. Some consider this approach to justice an archetypal example of an impartial judge displaying wisdom in making a ruling.

== Biblical narrative ==
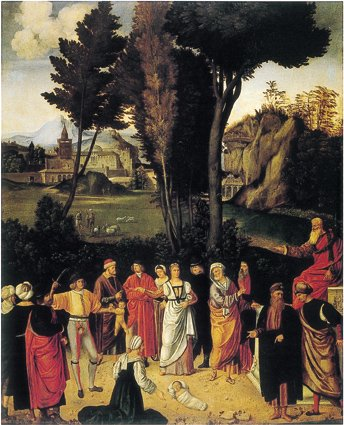
The Judgement of Solomon (School of Giorgione, 1500)

1 Kings 3:16–28 recounts that two mothers living in the same house, each the mother of an infant son, came to Solomon. One of the babies had been smothered, and each claimed the remaining boy as her own. Calling for a sword, Solomon declared his judgment: the baby would be cut in two, each woman to receive half. One mother did not contest the ruling, declaring that if she could not have the baby then neither of them could, but the other begged Solomon, "Give the baby to her, just don't kill him!"

The king declared the second woman the true mother, as a mother would even give up her baby if that was necessary to save its life, and awarded her custody. This judgment became known throughout all of Israel and was considered an example of profound wisdom.

== Classification and parallels ==
The story is commonly viewed in scholarship as an instance or a reworking of a folktale. Its folkloristic nature is apparent, among other things, in the dominance of direct speech which moves the plot on and contributes to the characterization. The story is classified as Aarne-Thompson tale type 926, and many parallel stories have been found in world folklore. In Uther's edition of the Aarne-Thompson index, this tale type is classified as a folk novella, and belongs to a subgroup designated "Clever Acts and Words". Eli Yassif defines the folk novella as "a realistic story whose time and place are determined ... The novella emphasizes such human traits as cleverness, eroticism, loyalty, and wiliness, that drive the plot forward more than any other element".

Hugo Gressmann has found several similar stories in world folklore and literature, especially in India and the far east. One Indian version is a Jataka story dealing with Buddha in one of his previous incarnations as the sage Mahosadha, who arbitrates between a mother and a Yakshini who is in the shape of a woman, who kidnapped the mother's baby and claimed he was hers. The sage announced a tug of war, drawing a line on the ground and asking the two to stand on opposite sides of it, one holding the baby's feet, the other his hands – the one who pulled the baby's whole body beyond the line would get to keep him. The mother, seeing how the baby suffered, released him and, weeping, let the Yakshini take him. When the sage saw that, he returned the baby to the hands of the true mother, exposed the identity of the Yakshini and expelled her. In other Indian versions, the two women are widows of one husband. Another version appears in Li Qianfu's Chinese drama The Chalk Circle (in which the judge draws a circle on the ground), which has spread worldwide, many versions and reworkings being made, such as Bertolt Brecht's 1940s play The Caucasian Chalk Circle.

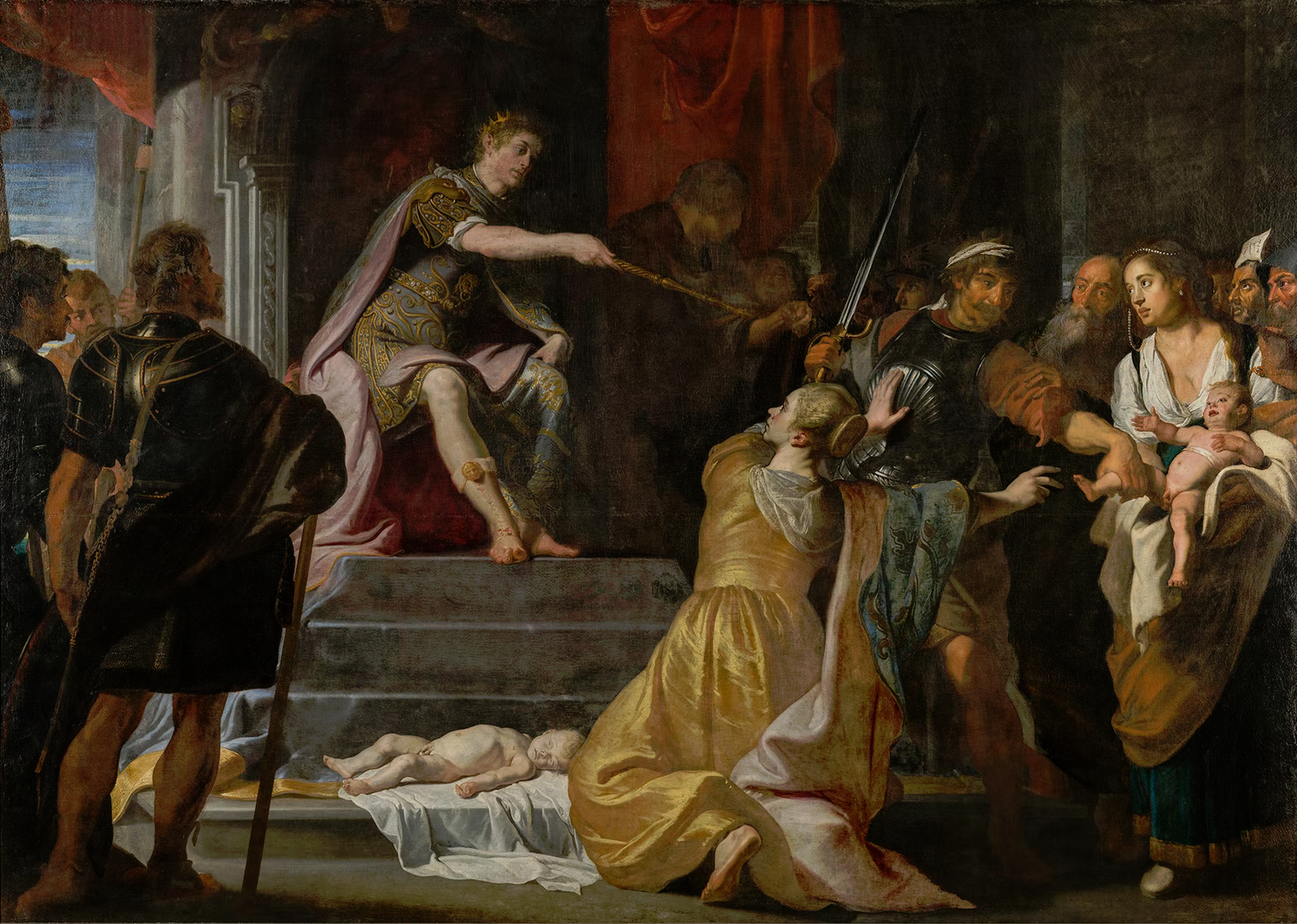
The Judgement of Solomon by Gaspar de Crayer, c. 1620

The common motif in those parallel versions is that the wise judge announces an absurd procedure, which is reasonable in some perverse way: splitting the baby, according to the principle of compromise; or a tug of war, in which one can possibly presume that the true mother will be motivated to pull harder. But the procedure is actually a concealed emotional test, designed to force each woman to decide between her compassion for the baby and her will to win.

There is indirect evidence that the story was also widespread in ancient times in the western world. A Greek papyrus fragment, dating from the beginning of the second century AD, includes a fragmented reference to an ancient legal case which is similar to the judgment of Solomon. The writer ascribes the story to Phliliskos of Miletos, living in the fourth century BC. A fresco found in the "House of the Physician" in Pompeii depicts pygmies introducing a scene similar to the biblical story. Some think that the fresco relates directly to the biblical story, while according to others it represents a parallel tradition.

Several suggestions for the genre of the biblical story have been raised beyond its characterization as a folktale of a known type. Edward Lipinski suggests that the story is an example of "king's bench tales", a subgenre of the wisdom literature to which he finds parallels in Sumerian literature.

Scholars have pointed out that the story resembles the modern detective story genre. Both king Solomon and the reader are confronted with some kind of a juridical-detective riddle. Meir Sternberg notes that two genres merge in the story: A riddle and a test; the juridical dilemma, which is the riddle, also constitutes a test for the young king: if he can solve it, he will be acknowledged as possessing divine wisdom. Stuart Lasine classifies the story as a law-court riddle.

According to Raymond Westbrook, the story is essentially a hypothetical problem, introduced to the recipient as a pure intellectual challenge and not as a concrete juridical case. In such problems, any unnecessary detail is usually omitted and this is why the characters in the story have no distinctive characteristics. The description of the case eliminates the possibility of obtaining circumstantial evidence, thereby forcing the recipient to confront the dilemma directly and not seek indirect ways to solve it.

Some scholars think that the original folk story underwent significant literary reworking so that in its biblical crystallization it can no longer be defined as a folktale. Jacob Liver notes the absence of any "local coloring" in the story, and concludes that the story is "not an actual folk tale but a scholarly reworking of a folk tale (apparently from a non-Israelite source) which in some way reached the court circles of Jerusalem in the times of Solomon". Similarly, Ze'ev Weisman notes that the story seems "more of a paradigmatic anecdote created in the milieu of courtly wisdom than a folktale".

== Origin ==
The story has a number of parallels in folktales from various cultures. All of the known parallels, among them several from India, have been recorded in later periods than the biblical story; nevertheless, it is unclear whether they reflect earlier or later traditions. Hermann Gunkel rules out the possibility that such a sophisticated motif had developed independently in different places. Some scholars are of the opinion that the source of the story is untraceable.

In the biblical version, the two women are identified as prostitutes, but in some Indian versions they are widows of one husband. Some scholars have inferred the origin of the story from this difference. Following Gressmann, Gunkel speculates a possible Indian origin, on the basis that "[s]uch stories of wise judgments are the real life stuff of the Indian people", and that, in his view, "a prostitute has no reason to value a child which was not born to her"; he acknowledges, however, that the Indian versions "belong to a later period". On the other hand, Lasine opines that the Hebrew story is better motivated than the Indian one, for it alone attributes the motivation for the behavior of both women to typical motherly feelings: compassion for the true mother and jealousy for the impostor. Other scholars point out that such a travelling folktale might become, in its various forms, more or less coherent. The assertion that one version is more coherent than the other does not compel the conclusion that the first is more original, making the argument about which version's women had more compelling reasons to fight over the child irrelevant.

== Composition and editorial framing ==
The story is considered to be literarily unified, without significant editorial intervention. The ending of the story, noting the wisdom of Solomon, is considered to be a Deuteronomistic addition to the text.

Some scholars consider the story an originally independent unit, integrated into its present context by an editor. Solomon's name is not mentioned in the story and he is simply called "the king". Considered out of context, the story leaves the king anonymous just like the other characters. Some scholars think that the original tale was not necessarily about Solomon, and perhaps dealt with a typical unnamed king. A different opinion is held by Eli Yassif, who thinks the author of the Book of Kings did not attribute the story to Solomon on his own behalf, but the attribution to Solomon had already developed in preliterary tradition.

Scholars point out that the story is linked to the preceding account of Solomon's dream in Gibeon, by the common pattern of prophetic dream and its subsequent fulfillment. Some think this proximity of the stories results from the work of a redactor. Others, such as Saul Zalewski, consider the two accounts to be inseparable and to form a literarily unified unit.

In its broader context, the Judgment of Solomon forms part of the account of Solomon's reign, generally conceived as a distinct segment in the Book of Kings, encompassing chapters 3–11 in 1 Kings; some include in it also chapters 1–2, while others think that these chapters originally ended the account of David's reign in 2 Samuel. According to Liver, the source for the Judgment of Solomon story, as well as for other parts of the account of Solomon's reign, is in the speculated book of the Acts of Solomon, which he proposes to be a wisdom work which originated in court circles shortly after the split of the united monarchy.

== Analysis ==
=== General description ===
The story may be divided into two parts, similar in length, matching the trial's sequence. In the first part (verses 16–22) the case is described: The two women introduce their arguments and, at this point, no response from the king is recorded. In the second part (23–28) the decision is described: the king is the major speaker and the one who directs the plot. Apart from this clear twofold division, suggestions have been raised as to the plot structure and the literary structure of the story and its internal relations.

As stated before, most of the story is reported by direct speech of the women and Solomon, with a few sentences and utterance verbs by the narrator. The dialogues move the plot forward. The women's contradictory testimonies create the initial conflict necessary to build up the dramatic tension. The king's request to bring him a sword enhances the tension, as the reader wonders why it is needed. The story comes to its climax with the shocking royal order to cut the boy, which for a moment casts doubt on the king's judgment. But what seems to be the verdict turns out to be a clever trick which achieves its goal, and results in the recognition of the true mother, and the resolution.

=== Purpose ===
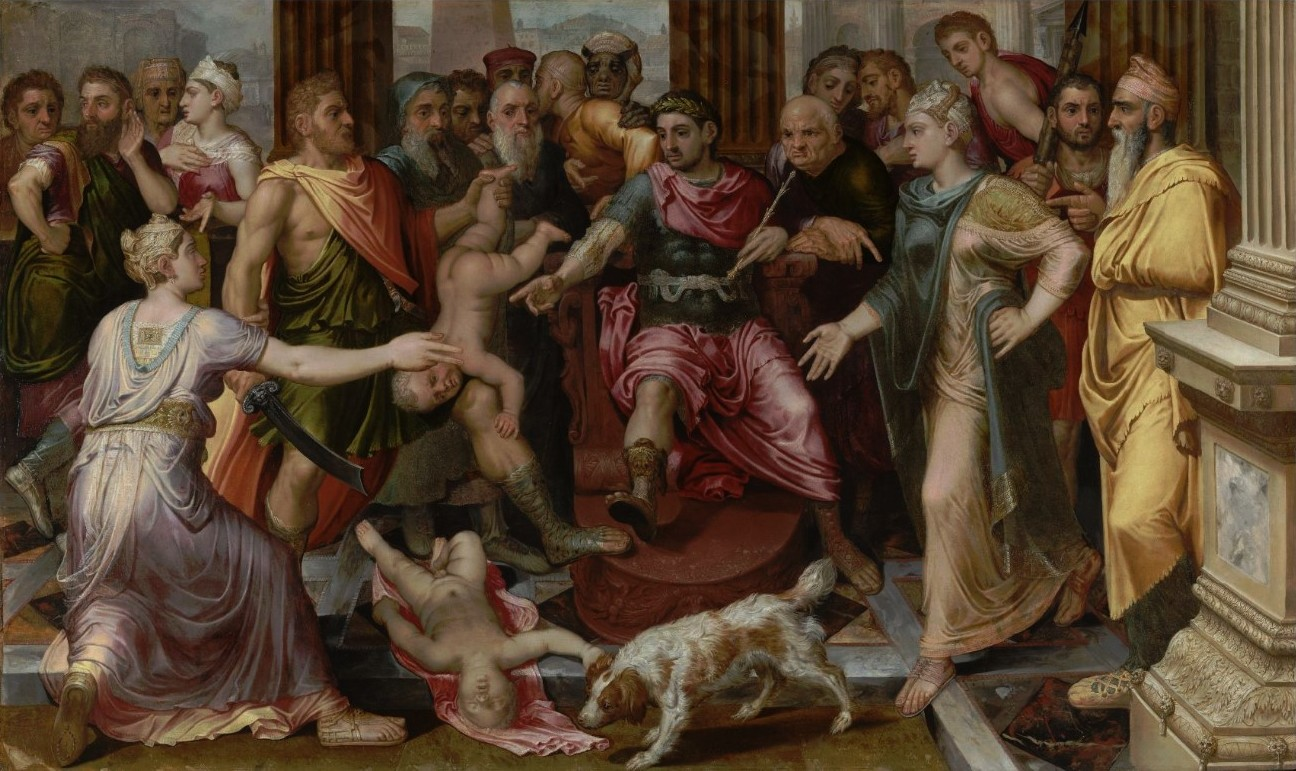
The Judgement of Solomon by Frans Floris, c. 1647

The major overt purpose of the account of Solomon's reign, to which the Judgment of Solomon belongs as stated above, is to glorify King Solomon, and his wisdom is one of the account's dominant themes. The exceptions are: The first two chapters (1 Kings 1–2) which, according to many scholars portray a dubious image of Solomon, and as stated above, are sometimes ascribed to a separate work; and the last chapter in the account (11), which describes Solomon's sins in his old age. Nevertheless, many scholars point out elements in the account that criticize Solomon, anticipating his downfall in chapter 11.

In its immediate context, the story follows the account of Solomon's dream at Gibeon, in which he was promised by God he would be given unprecedented wisdom. Most scholars read the story at face value and conclude that its major purpose is to demonstrate the fulfilment of the divine promise and to illustrate Solomon's wisdom expressed in juridical form. Other scholars also recognize in this story, as in other parts of the account of Solomon's reign, ironic elements which are not consistent with the story's overt purpose to glorify Solomon.

Some scholars assume, as already mentioned, that the story existed independently before it was integrated into its current context. Willem Beuken thinks that the original tale was not about the king's wisdom – the concluding note about Solomon's wisdom is considered secondary – but about a woman who, by listening to her motherly instinct, helped the king to break through the legal impasse. Beuken notes additional biblical stories which share the motif of the woman who influenced the king: Bathsheba, the woman of Tekoa, and Solomon's foreign wives who seduced him into idolatry. Beuken concludes that the true mother exemplifies the biblical character type of the wise woman. He proposes an analysis of the literary structure of the story, according to which the section that notes the compassion of the true mother (verse 26b) constitutes one of the two climaxes of the story, along with the section that announces Solomon's divine wisdom (verse 28b). According to this analysis, the story in its current context gives equal weight to the compassion of the true mother and to the godly wisdom that guided Solomon in the trial.

According to Marvin Sweeney, in its original context, as part of the Deuteronomistic history, the story exalted Solomon as a wise ruler and presented him as a model to Hezekiah. Later, the narrative context of the story underwent another Deuteronomistic redaction that undermined Solomon's figure in comparison to Josiah. In its current context, the story implicitly criticizes Solomon for violating the biblical law that sets the priests and Levites at the top of the judicial hierarchy (Deuteronomy 17:8–13).

=== Intra-biblical allusions ===
Several stories in the Hebrew Bible bear similarity to the Judgment of Solomon and scholars think they allude to it.

The most similar story is that of the two cannibal mothers in 2 Kings 6:24–33, which forms part of the Elisha cycle. The background is a famine in Samaria, caused by a siege on the city. As the king passes through the city, a woman calls him and asks him to decide in a quarrel between her and another woman. The women had agreed to cook and eat the son of one woman, and on the other day to do the same with the son of the other woman; but after they had eaten the first woman's son, the other woman hid her own son. The king, shocked from the description of the case, tore up his royal cloth and revealed that he was wearing sackcloth beneath it. He blamed Elisha for the circumstances and went on to chase him.

There are some striking similarities between this story and the Judgment of Solomon. Both deal with nameless women who gave birth to a son. One of the sons dies, and a quarrel erupts as to the fate of the other one. The case is brought before the king to decide. According to Lasine, the comparison between the stories emphasizes the absurdity of the situation in the story of the cannibal mothers: While in the Judgment of Solomon, the king depends on his knowledge of maternal nature to decide the case, the story of the cannibal women describes a "topsy-turvy" world in which maternal nature does not work as expected, thus leaving the king helpless.

=== The women's characters ===
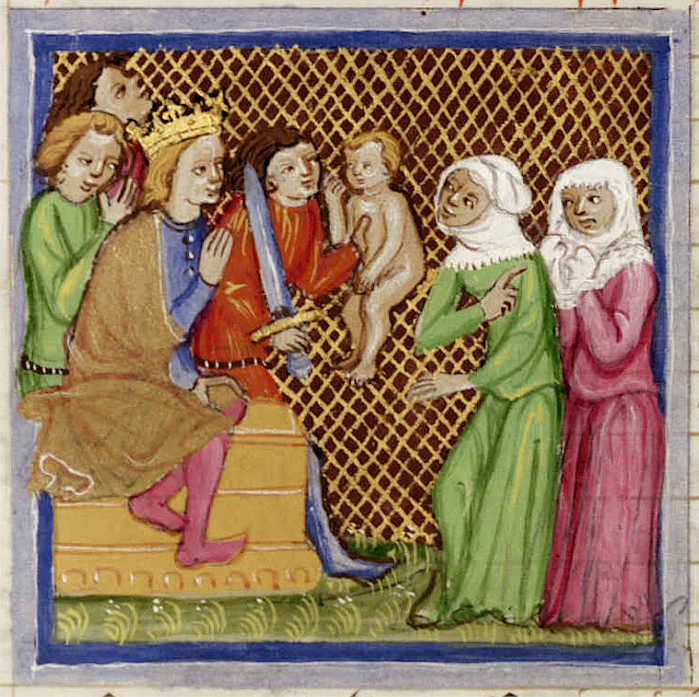
1417 A.D., Olomouc, Moravia. Miniature from the Olomouc Bible: King Solomon delivers judgment in a dispute between two women over a child. (Bible olomoucká, I. díl, I. 1417, folio 148v)

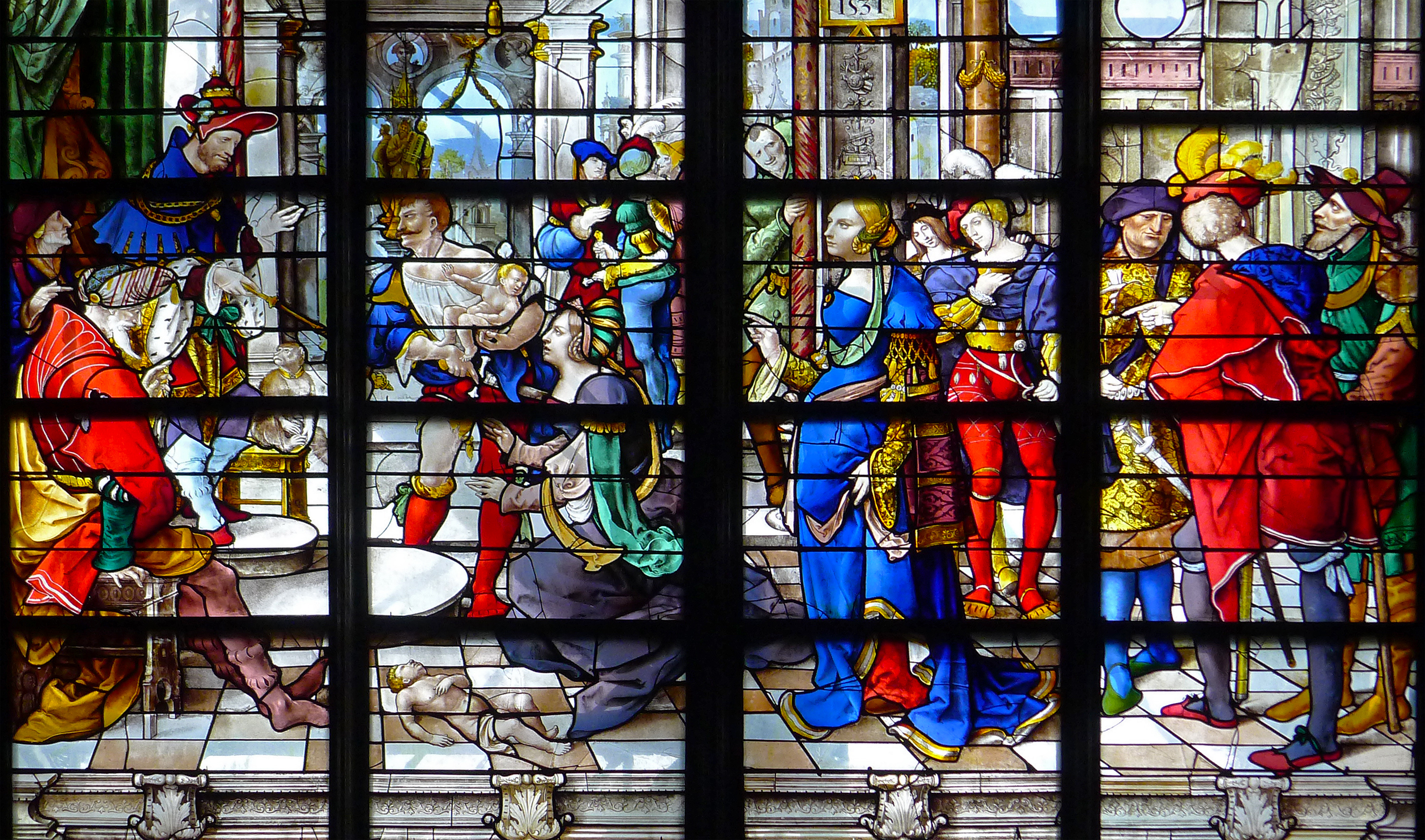
Église Saint-Gervais-Saint-Protais (shade "jugement de Salomon", detail) - Paris 5e.

Like many other women in the Hebrew Bible, the two women in this story are anonymous. It is speculated their names have not been mentioned so that they would not overshadow Solomon's wisdom, which is the main theme of the story. The women seem to be poor. They live alone in a shared residence, without servants. The women have been determined to be prostitutes. As prostitutes, they lack male patronage and have to take care of themselves in a patriarchal society.

The women's designation as prostitutes is necessary as background to the plot. It clarifies why the women live alone, gave birth alone and were alone during the alleged switch of the babies. The lack of witnesses seems to create a legal impasse that only the wise king can solve. It also clarifies why the women are not represented by their husbands, as is customary in biblical society. Solomon is depicted as a king accessible to all of his subjects, even those in the margins of society. The women's designation as prostitutes links the story to the common biblical theme of God as the protector of the weak, "A father to the fatherless, a defender of widows" (Psalms 68:5). Prostitutes in biblical society are considered functional widows, for they have no male patron to represent them in court and their sons are considered fatherless. They also bear similarity to the proselyte who is sometimes mentioned in the Hebrew Bible with the widow and the fatherless, in that they are socially marginalized and deprived of the right to advocacy. They can seek justice from only one source: God, embodied in the story as the source of Solomon's wisdom.

The women are not explicitly condemned for their occupation, and some think that the narrator does not intend to discredit them for being prostitutes, and their conduct should be judged against universal human standards. On the other hand, Phyllis Bird thinks that the story presupposes the stereotypical biblical image of the prostitute as a selfish liar. The true mother is revealed when her motherly essence – which is also stereotypical – surpasses her selfish essence. Athalya Brenner notes that both women's maternal instinct is intact: For the true mother it is manifested, as mentioned, in the compassion and devotion that she shows for her son; and for the impostor it is manifested in her desire for a son, which makes her steal the other mother's son when her own son dies. According to Brenner, one of the lessons of the story is that "true maternal feelings ... may exist even in the bosom of the lowliest woman".

The women are designated in the Hebrew text as zōnōṯ (זוֹנוֹת), which is the plural form of the adjective zōnâ (זוֹנָה), prostitute. However, some propose a different meaning for this word in the context of the story, such as "tavern owner" or "innkeeper". These proposals are usually dismissed as apologetic. Jerome T. Walsh combines the two meanings, and suggests that in ancient Near East, some prostitutes also provided lodging services (cf. the story of Rahab).

=== Comparison to detective literature ===
As mentioned before, many scholars have compared the story to the modern genre of detective story. A striking feature in the biblical story, untypical to its parallels, is that it does not begin with a credible report of the omniscient narrator about the events that took place before the trial; it immediately opens with the women's testimonies. Thus, the reader is unable to determine whether the account given by the plaintiff is true or false, and he confronts, along with Solomon, a juridical-detective riddle. According to Sternberg, the basic convention shared by the Judgment of Solomon and the detective story genre is the "fair-play rule", which states that both the reader and the detective figure are exposed to the same relevant data.

Lasine, dealing with the story from a sociological perspective, points out that, like the detective story, the Judgment of Solomon story deals with human "epistemological anxiety" deriving from the fact that man, as opposed to God, is generally unable to know what is in the mind of other men. The detective story, as well as this biblical story, provides a comfort to this anxiety with the figure of the detective, or Solomon in this case: A master of human nature, a man who can see into the depths of one's soul and extract the truth from within it. This capability is conceived as a superhuman quality, inasmuch as Solomon's wisdom in judgment is described as a gift from God. There is an ambiguity concerning whether such a capability may serve as a model for others, or is unavailable to ordinary men.

By the end of the story, Solomon reveals the identity of the true mother. But according to the Hebrew text, while the king solves the riddle, the reader is not exposed to the solution; literally translated from the Hebrew text, Solomon command reads: "Give her the living child...". One cannot infer whether the word "her" refers to the plaintiff or to the defendant, as the narrator remains silent on the matter.

== Jewish interpretation ==
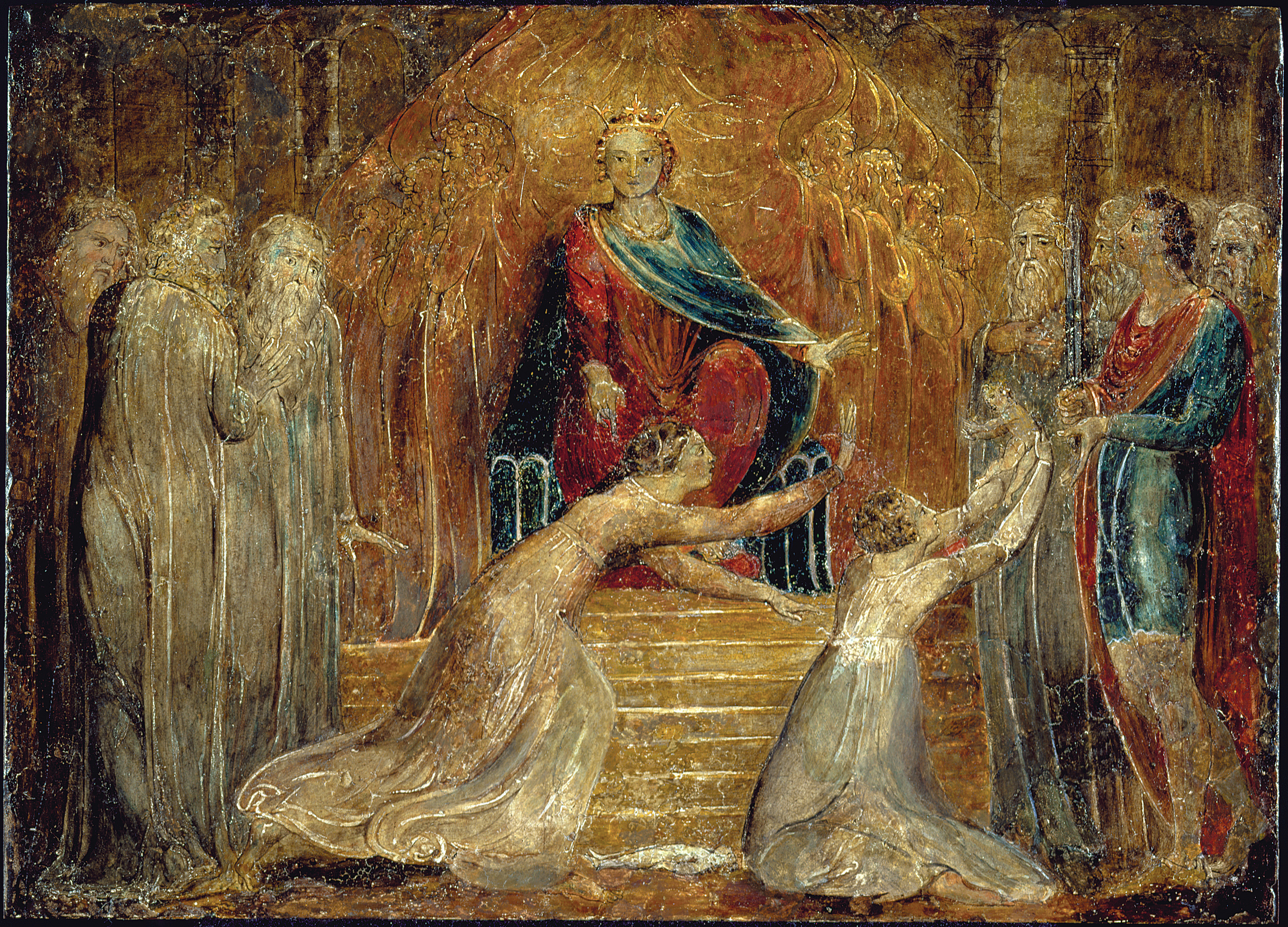
The Judgment of Solomon by William Blake in Tempera. Currently, the object is held at the Fitzwilliam Museum.

According to the Midrash, the two women were mother- and daughter-in-law, both of whom had borne sons and whose husbands had died. The lying daughter-in-law was obliged by the laws of Yibbum to marry her brother-in-law unless released from the arrangement through a formal ceremony. As her brother-in-law was the living child, she was required to marry him when he came of age, or wait the same amount of time to be released and remarry. When Solomon suggested splitting the infant in half, the lying woman, wishing to escape the constraints of Yibbum in the eyes of God, agreed. Thus was Solomon able to know who the real mother was.

== Representations in art ==
If the above-mentioned Pompean fresco indeed depicts the Judgment of Solomon, it is the first known painting of a biblical story (presently moved to the Museo Nazionale in Naples).

This theme has long been a popular subject for artists and is often chosen for the decoration of courthouses. In the Netherlands, many 17th century courthouses (Vierschaar rooms) contain a painting or relief of this scene. Elsewhere in Europe, celebrated examples include:

- Fresco by Raphael
- The Judgement of Solomon by William Blake
- Etching by Gustave Doré
- Woodcut by the school of Michael Wolgemut in the Nuremberg Chronicle
- Paintings by Andrea Mantegna, Poussin and Franz Caucig
- Relief sculpture on the Doge's Palace in Venice by an unknown artist (near the exit into St. Mark's Square)
- Stained glass window by Jean Chastellain in St-Gervais-et-St-Protais church of Paris

=== Music ===
- Giacomo Carissimi: Judicium Salomonis, Oratorio for 3 chorus, 2 violins and organ.
- Marc-Antoine Charpentier: Judicium Salomonis H. 422, Oratorio for soloists, chorus, woodwinds, strings, and continuo. (1702)
- Handel: Solomon, HWV.67, for soloists, chorus and orchestra. Oratorio 1749

== Idiomatic use ==
=== "Splitting the baby" ===
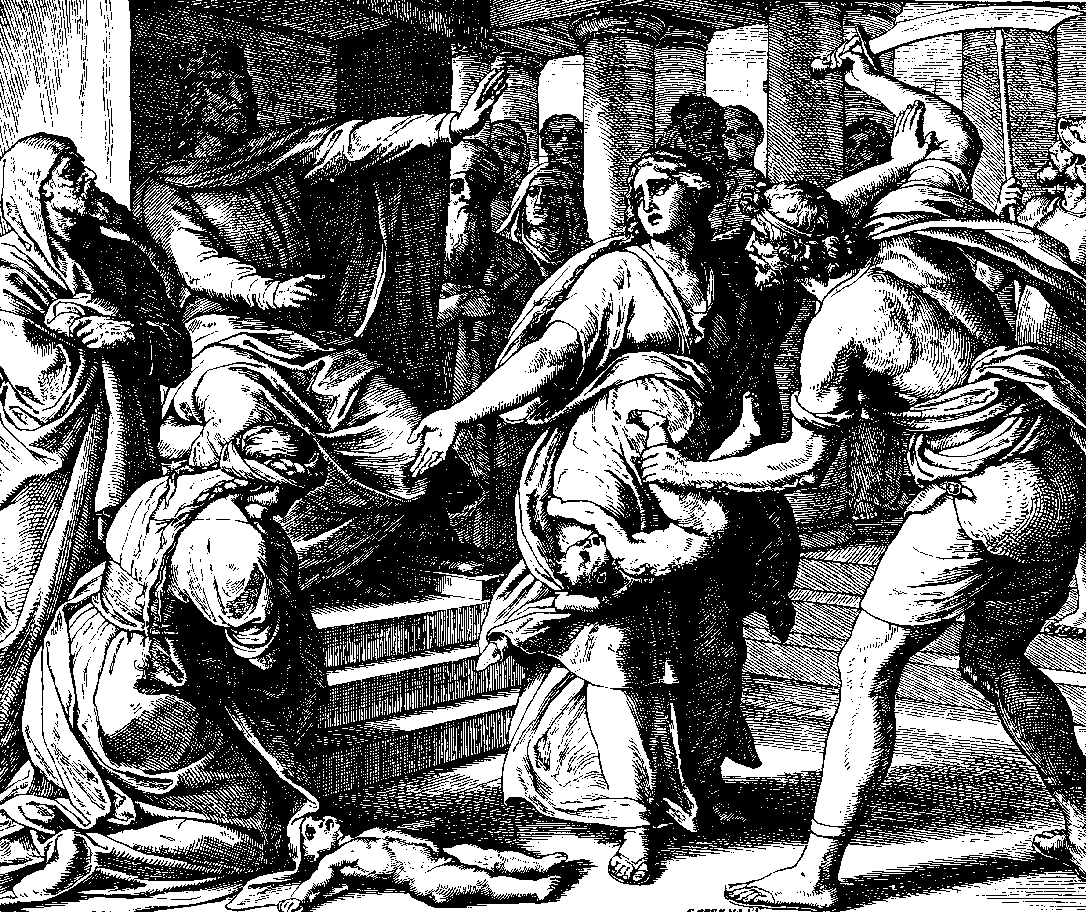
Solomon's Wisdom, 1860 woodcut by Julius Schnorr von Karolsfeld

The expressions "splitting the baby" or "cutting the baby in half" can be used to describe a split award (usually accompanied by a split costs award) in the most for a heavy-handed, costs-insensitive suit (such as entailing multiple hearings and disproportionate spending on both sides) for a relatively simple compromise. The analogy reminds litigants to keep their costs down in cases where a judge might well divide fault, i.e. might "split the difference" in terms of damage awards or other remedies between the two parties (a very common example is in a comparative negligence case also known as contributory negligence scenario).

In other instances, lawyers and legal commentators may use "split the baby" to refer to any compromise or ruling in which both sides can claim partial victory. Some commentators have noted, however, that this usage is inconsistent with the Biblical narrative, in which Solomon's solution did not involve actually splitting the baby or finding a compromise but, rather, provided evidence that led to a total victory for one of the claimants.

== See also ==
- Books of Kings
- The Dog in the Manger
