= Klabund =

Pen name of Alfred Henschke, German writer

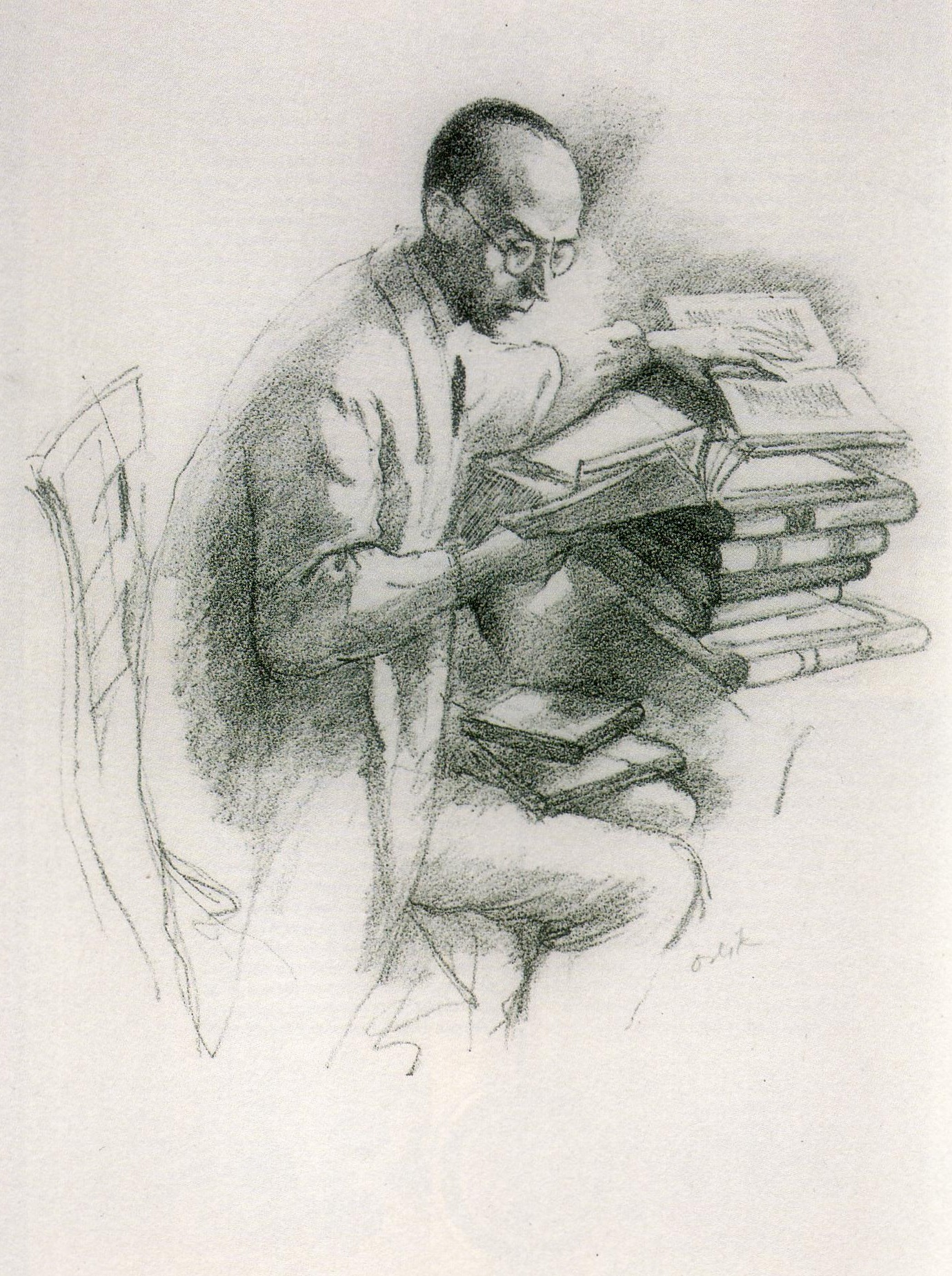
Emil Orlik: The poet Klabund, Lithography from 1915

Alfred Henschke (4 November 1890 – 14 August 1928), better known by his pseudonym Klabund, was a German writer.

== Life ==
Klabund, born Alfred Henschke in 1890 in Crossen, was the son of an apothecary. At the age of 16 he came down with tuberculosis, which the doctors initially misdiagnosed as pneumonia. The illness stayed with him for the rest of his short life.

After completing his Abitur (upper secondary school leaving certificate) with the highest marks in 1909 in Frankfurt (Oder), he studied chemistry and pharmacology in Munich. He soon changed his plans, however, and studied philosophy, philology, and theater in Munich, Berlin, and Lausanne. He had already encountered Bohemianism in Munich through the theater scholar Artur Kutscher, and through others he was introduced to Frank Wedekind. In 1912 he quit his studies and took on the pseudonym Klabund, styling himself after Peter Hille as a vagabond poet. A first volume of poetry was published under the title Morgenrot! Klabund! Die Tage dämmern! (Dawn! Klabund! The Days Break!) The name Klabund goes back to a north and northeast German name and was devised by him and others as a combination of Klabautermann (a devious hobgoblin of German folklore) and Vagabund (vagabond).

In 1913 Klabund came into contact with Alfred Kerr's Magazine PAN, though he continued to publish in the magazines Jugend and Simplicissimus. Beginning in 1914 he contributed to Die Schaubühne, which later changed its name to Die Weltbühne (The World Stage). When World War I broke out, he greeted it with enthusiasm, like many other writers of the time, wrote various patriotic poems. He was not drafted into the military due to his tuberculosis, and in fact during the war years he often spent time in Swiss sanatoria. During this time he began to develop an interest in far eastern literature, which he began to translate and adapt. Over the course of the war, Klabund's outlook changed and he became an opponent of it. In 1917 he published an open letter to Kaiser Wilhelm II in the newspaper Neue Zürcher Zeitung calling for his abdication, and was charged with treason and lèse-majesté as a result.

In 1918 he married Brunhilde Herberle, whom he had met in a sanatorium for lung patients. She died later that year after complications from a premature birth. 1918 also saw the publication of Klabund's most popular prose piece, the novel Bracke.

in 1920 Klabund dedicated the short romantic novel Marietta to his girlfriend and muse Marietta di Monaco.

In 1923 he married the actress Carola Neher. Then in 1925, his play Der Kreidekreis (The Chalk Circle), based on a Chinese story, was first produced in Meissen. The Berlin performances of the play later that year achieved great success; (Bertolt Brecht later adapted the play in his Kaukasischer Kreidekreis (The Caucasian Chalk Circle)). In the years that followed, Klabund wrote regularly for cabarets, including Schall und Rauch. His folksy poems and songs achieved great popularity.

In May 1928, during a stay in Italy, he fell ill with pneumonia, which, together with his latent tuberculosis, was life-threatening. He was brought to Davos for treatment, but he died shortly thereafter. He was buried in his native Crossen (now Krosno Odrzańskie) and was eulogized by his friend and fellow writer Gottfried Benn. A star on the Walk of Fame of Cabaret in Mainz is dedicated to him.

== Works ==
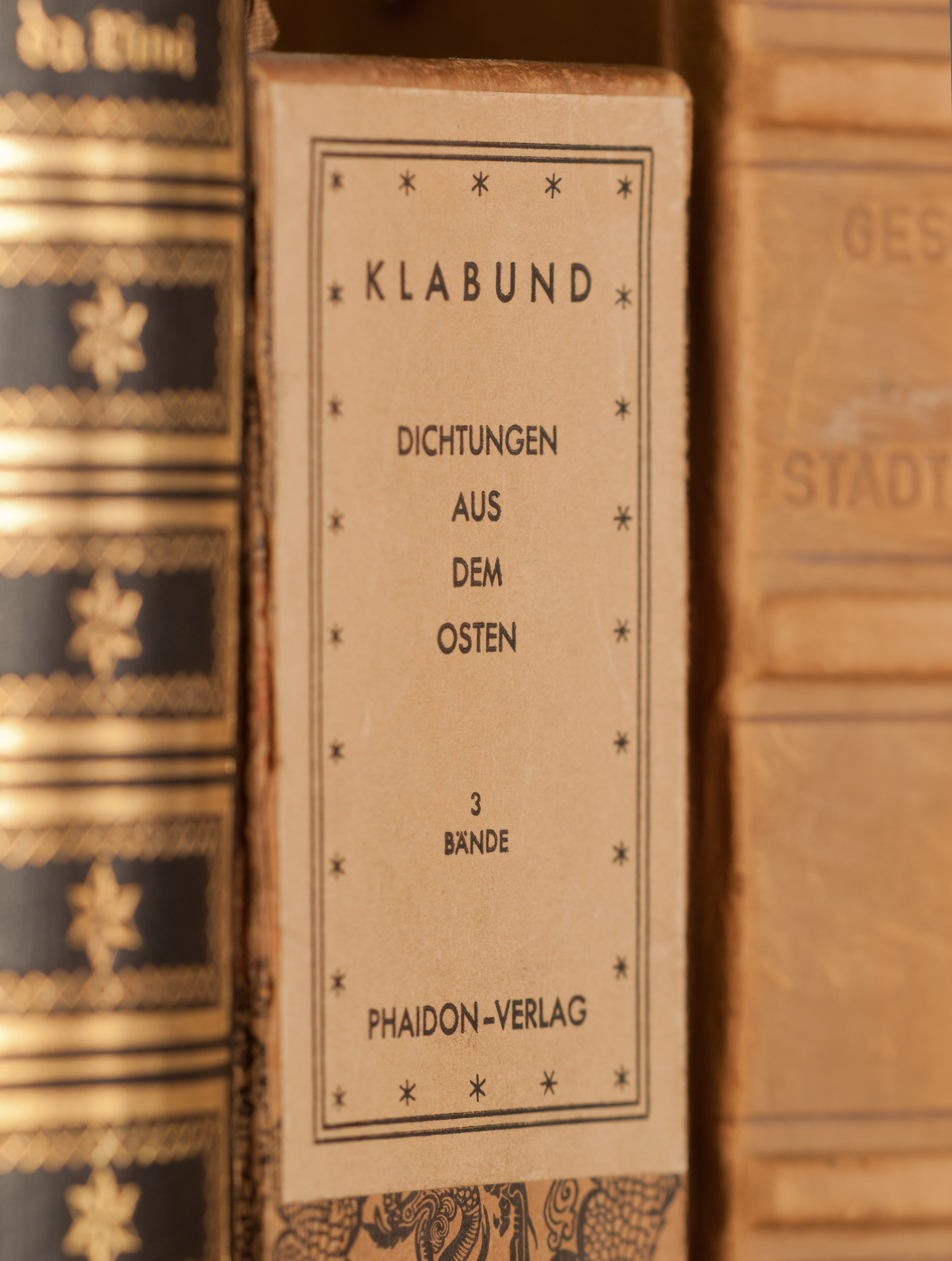
The posthumous collection Dichtungen aus dem Osten (German, 1929)

Klabund completed 25 plays and 14 novels—several of which were published only after his death—numerous short stories, many adaptations, and several works on the history of literature. Between 1998 and 2003, a collection of his works appeared in eight volumes.

== Selected filmography ==
- Wood Love (1925)
