= Franz Fehringer =

German opera singer

Franz Fehringer (7 September 1910 – 15 March 1988) was a German operatic tenor, particularly associated with light lyric roles in the German, Italian, and French repertories.

Fehringer was born in Nussloch. He studied in Karlsruhe with Jan van Gorkom and Dr. Zimmermann, and made his debut there in 1934, in the tenor part of Beethoven's Ninth Symphony, the following year he appeared in Handel's Serse, and later in Rodelinda. He remained in Karlsruhe until 1938, and during the war, he sang mostly in Wiesbaden and on German radio.

After the war, he appeared in Cologne, Frankfurt, Hamburg, while continuing singing on radio. He made a few guest appearances abroad, notably in Hilversum and Paris. Notables roles included Don Ottavio, Almaviva, Tonio, Hoffmann, Hans, Narraboth, etc.

Fehringer was also very popular in operetta (many recordings were made with conductor Franz Marszalek), and was an admired recitalist of lieder. Beginning in 1960, he taught at the Musikhochschule Mainz, and later at the Heidelberg Musikhochschule. He died in 1988 in Heidelberg.

== Selected recordings ==
- 1948 - Rossini - Der Barbier von Sevilla - Gunther Ambrosius, Sari Barabas, Franz Fehringer, Kurt Schneider, Xavier Waibel - Frankfurt Radio Chorus and Orchestra, Kurt Schroder - Cantus Classic
- 1953 - Adam - Wenn ich Konig war - Olga Moll, Maria Madlen Madsen, Franz Fehringer, Kurt Gester, Willy Hofmann - Frankfurt Radio Chorus and Orchestra, Wolfgang Sawallisch - Relief

== Sources ==
- Operissimo.com
