= Artūrs Cavara =

Latvian opera singer

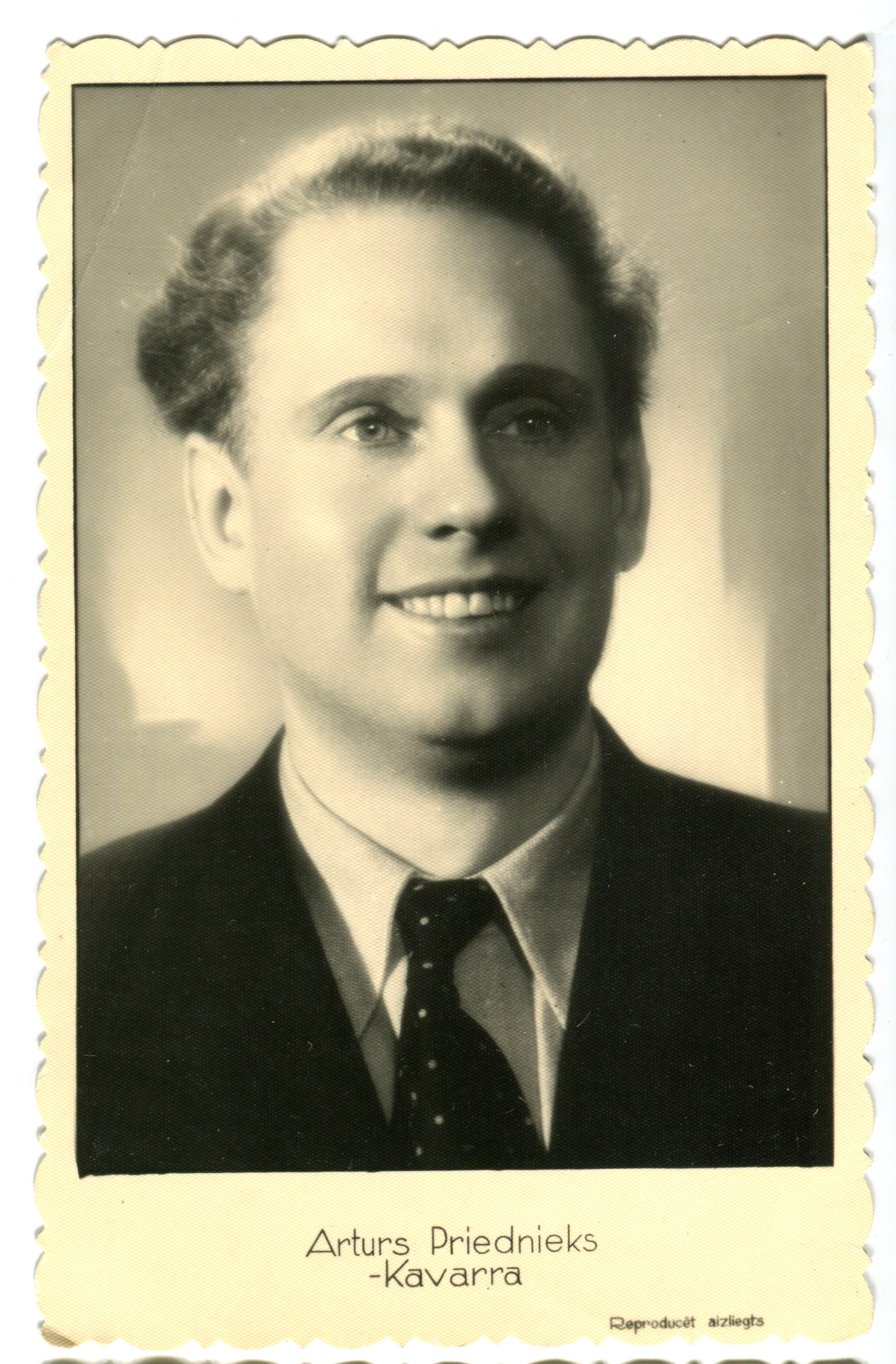

Artūrs Priednieks-Cavara (born Artūrs Vilhelms Priednieks; 29 June 1901 – 9 April 1979) was a Latvian operatic tenor during the late 1920s through the early 1940s. Cavara had performing contracts with the State Opera Houses of Vienna, Berlin, the Latvian National Opera in Riga, the City Opera Houses in Liepāja, Zurich, Wiesbaden, Barmen-Elberfel, and the Buenos Aires Teatro Colón in Argentina.

Cavara was born in Liepāja to Sīmaņas and Līze Priedniekas (née Krūms). He began his vocal training in 1924 at the Liepāja Conservatory. While performing outside of Latvia, he used the stage name Artūrs Cavara, in honor of his favorite role of Mario Cavaradosi from Giacomo Puccini's 1900 opera Tosca. While performing In Latvia, however, he generally used his birthname, Artūrs Priednieks. He was occasionally billed under the alternate spellings Kavara, or Kavarra. Cavara's success and stardom peaked in the 1930s, but due to World War II and Joseph Stalin's invasion of Latvia in the early 1940s, his singing and recording career was cut short prematurely; subsequently, many of his recordings have been lost or lie in obscurity. In 1941, he was arrested and briefly imprisoned in the Riga Central Prison. After his release, he continued to work at the Riga Opera, as well as to give concerts in various Latvian cities.

In 1947, he and his family fled Latvia to the United States via Ellis Island, settling in St. Peter, Minnesota, where he taught vocal instruction and opera production at Gustavus Adolphus College. He died on 9 April 1979, in Florida. His ashes are interred at the Latvian Memorial Park in the Catskills, Elka Park, New York.

== Selected filmography ==
- The White Devil (1930)
- The Immortal Vagabond (1930)
