= The Chalk Circle =

Chinese play

- Original language: Classical Chinese
- Written by: Li Qianfu
- Characters: Zhang Haitang; Ma Junqing; Lady Liu; Zhang Lin; Bao Zheng
- Subject: Judge Bao fiction
- Genre: zaju

The Chalk Circle
- Traditional Chinese: 灰闌記
- Simplified Chinese: 灰阑记
- Literal meaning: story of the boundary of lime
Transcriptions
Standard Mandarin
- Hanyu Pinyin: huī lán jì

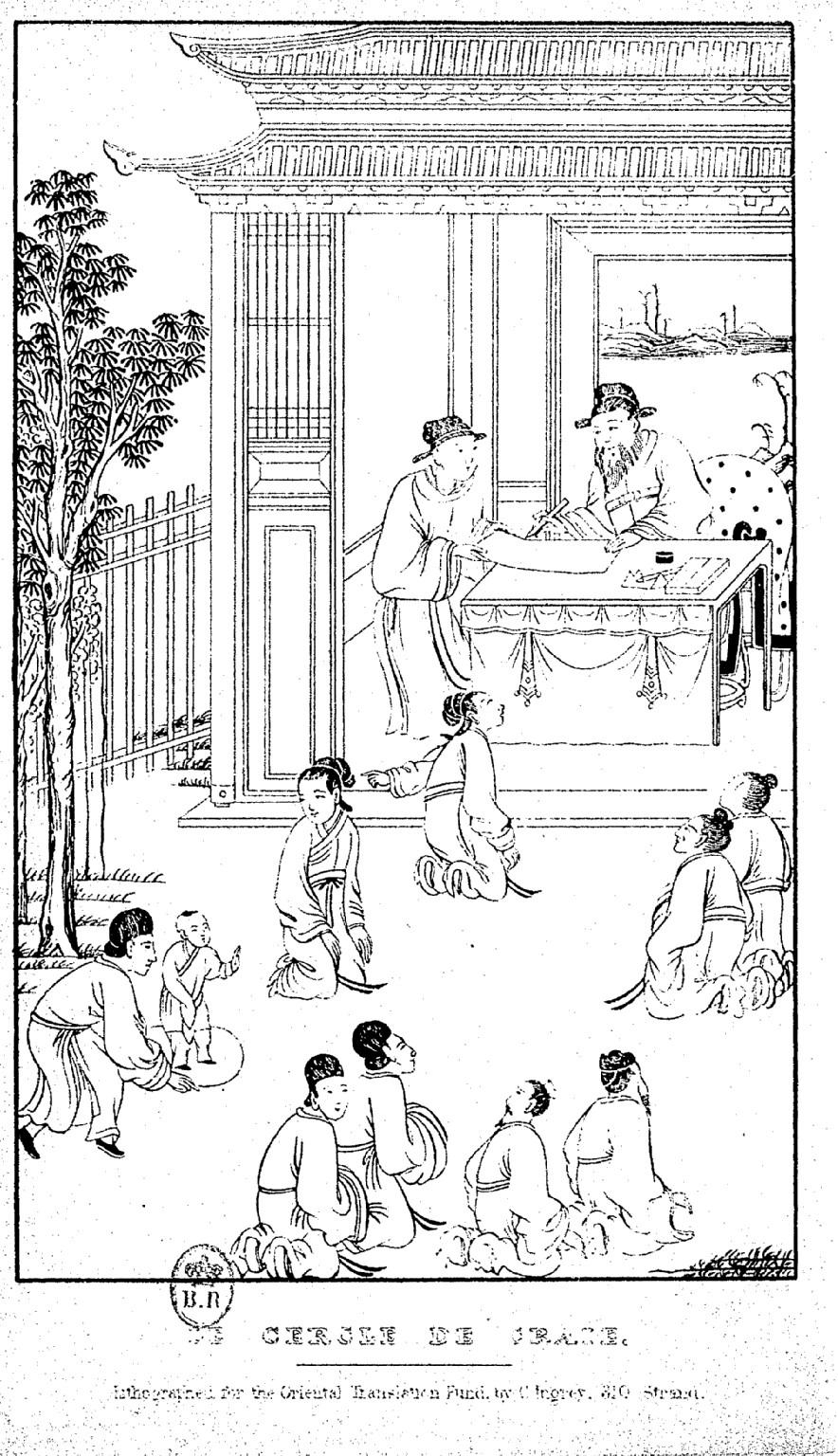
An illustration of a scene from The Chalk Circle

The Chalk Circle (sometimes translated The Circle of Chalk), by Li Qianfu, is a Yuan dynasty (1259–1368) Chinese classical zaju verse play and gong'an crime drama, in four acts with a prologue. It was preserved in a collection entitled Yuan-chu-po-cheng, or The Hundred Pieces. The Chinese language original is known for the beauty of its lyrical verse, and considered a Yuan masterpiece; a series of translations and revisions inspired several popular modern plays.

== Plot ==
A beautiful sixteen-year-old girl, Hai-tang (also transliterated Hai-t'ang, Hi-tang, or Chang-hi-tang), is sold into a house of prostitution by her impoverished family, after her father's death. There she is befriended by Ma Chun-shing, a wealthy and childless tax collector, who takes her into his house as his second wife. She bears him a son, Shoulang, but earns the jealousy of his first wife, Ah-Siu. Ah-Siu accuses Hai-tang of adultery, poisons Ma, blaming Hai-tang for the crime, and claims to a court that Shoulang is her own child, so that she can inherit Ma's fortune. Hai-tang is arrested, and beaten until she confesses. As Hai-tang is about to be hanged, she is rescued by Bao Zheng in a scene similar to the Judgment of Solomon: Shoulang is placed in a circle of chalk between the two women, and each is ordered to pull the child toward her; as Hai-tang cannot bear to hurt her child, she gives up the attempt —and so is judged his true mother.

== Adaptations ==
The play became first known in the Western world in a French language translation by Stanislas Julien, published in London in 1832 as Le Cercle de Craie. This was liberally re-translated into German by Klabund as Der Kreidekreis in 1924, which was very popular. In Klabund's version, the Emperor marries the heroine at the end of the play, while in the original she returns to live with her brother, who is now a court official. Based on Klabund's play, the Austrian composer Alexander von Zemlinsky adapted a libretto for his Der Kreidekreis, performed in Zurich in 1933.

Klabund's version was translated into English by James Laver as The Circle of Chalk, in five acts, published in London by William Heinemann in 1929. It was put on stage in March of that year, produced by Basil Dean, starring the American actress Anna May Wong, Australian actress Rose Quong, and British actor Laurence Olivier. As of 2008, this version is still being produced by various theatre groups.

In 1940, Bertolt Brecht wrote Der Augsburger Kreidekreis, a short story based on Der Kreidekreis, which reworks the story by omitting any Imperial intervention and making the first wife the biological mother, but having her abandon the child. The heroine is a serving girl who rescues and raises him, becoming the "real" mother. In 1944, he further reworked the story as the play, The Caucasian Chalk Circle, moving the events to medieval Georgia, adding a prologue set in Soviet Georgia, and greatly elaborating the narrative. In 2000, The Caucasian Chalk Circle in turn was rewritten as Full Circle, or The Berlin Circle, by Charles L. Mee, set in 1989 East Germany after the fall of Communism.

The famous Kyrgyz author and novelist Chinghiz Aitmatov was also indirectly inspired from the Chalk Circle, while writing his 1960 book, The Red Scarf. He used some indirect elements from the tale very loosely. The plot of the 1977 Turkish film "Selvi Boylum Al Yazmalım" was based on The Red Scarf. The movie is one of the best known films in Turkish cinema.

In 2018, Claire Conceison wrote and directed a play called The Chalk Cycle based on the original Yuan drama The Chalk Circle, the Brecht adaptation The Caucasian Chalk Circle, and the Custody battle for Anna Mae He.
