= The Caucasian Chalk Circle =

Theatre play by Bertolt Brecht

- Original language: German (premiered in English)
- Written by: Bertolt Brecht
- Subject: Parenthood, property, war
- Genre: Epic theatre
- Setting: Georgia

Premiere
- Date: 1948
- Place: Carleton College, Northfield, Minnesota, U.S.

The Caucasian Chalk Circle (German: Der kaukasische Kreidekreis) is a play by the German modernist playwright Bertolt Brecht. An example of Brecht's epic theatre, the play is a parable about a peasant girl who rescues a baby and becomes a better mother than the baby's wealthy biological parents.

The play was written in 1944 while Brecht was living in the United States. It was translated into English by Brecht's friend and admirer Eric Bentley. After Bentley failed to have it programmed at the University of Minnesota, where he taught, it was premiered by his student, Henry Goodman, in a student production at Carleton College, Northfield, Minnesota, in 1948. Its first professional production was at the Hedgerow Theatre, Philadelphia, directed by Bentley. Its German premiere by the Berliner Ensemble was on October 7, 1954, at the Theater am Schiffbauerdamm in Berlin.

The Caucasian Chalk Circle is one of Brecht's most celebrated works and one of the most regularly performed 'German' plays. It reworks Brecht's earlier short story "Der Augsburger Kreidekreis." Both derive from the 14th-century Chinese play The Chalk Circle by Li Xingdao.

== Plot summary ==
=== Prologue ===
Brecht, in his typical anti-realist style, uses the device of a "play within a play". The "frame" play is set in the Soviet Union around the end of the Second World War. It shows a dispute between two koljós (communes), the "Rosa Luxemburg" fruit growing commune and the collective goat farmers "Galinsk", over who is to own and manage an area of farm land after the Germans have retreated from a village and left it abandoned. A parable has been organised by one group, an old folk tale, to be played out to cast light on the dispute. The Singer, Arkadi Tcheidse, arrives with his band of musicians, then tells the peasants the parable, which forms the main narrative, and intertwines throughout much of the play. The Singer often takes on the thoughts of characters, enhances the more dramatic scenes with stronger narration than simple dialogue, and is responsible for most scene and time changes. Often the role is accompanied by several "musicians" (which incorporate music into the play itself) that help the Singer keep the play running smoothly. At the end he states that the land should go to those who will use it most productively, the fruit growers, and not those who had previous ownership.

=== Scene one: The Noble Child ===
The Singer's story begins with Governor Georgi Abashwili and his wife Natella blatantly ignoring the citizens on the way to Easter Mass. The Singer shows us the show's antagonist, Arsen Kazbeki, the Fat Prince. He sucks up to the pair and remarks how their new child Michael is "a governor from head to toe." They enter the church, leaving the peasants behind. Next to be introduced is the heroine Grusha Vashnadze, a maid to the governor's wife. Grusha, while carrying a goose for the Easter meal, meets a soldier, Simon Shashava, who reveals he has watched her bathe in the rivers. She storms off enraged.

The Singer continues the story: as the soldier contacts two architects for the Governor's new mansion, the Ironshirts, gestapo-esque guards, turn on him. The Fat Prince has orchestrated a coup and is now in control. The Governor is quickly beheaded. Simon finds Grusha and proposes, giving her his silver cross. Grusha accepts. Simon runs off to fulfill his duty to the Governor's wife, who has been foolishly packing clothing for the "trip", caring nothing for the loss of her husband. She is carried off, away from the flaming city of Nuhka and inadvertently leaves her son, Michael, behind. Grusha is left with the boy and, after seeing the Governor's head nailed to the church door, takes him with her to the mountains. Music is often incorporated throughout much of this scene with the aid of the Singer, musicians, and possibly Grusha, as Brecht includes actual "songs" within the text.

=== Scenes two and three: Flight into the Northern Mountains/In the Northern Mountains ===
The Singer opens the scene with an air of escape. At the beginning of this act Grusha is seen trying to escape but has to stop to get milk for the baby, Michael, and is forced to buy milk expensively from an old man who claims his goats have been taken away by the soldiers. This encounter slows her and she is followed shortly by the Ironshirts. Grusha then finds a home for Michael to stay in. Abandoning him on the doorstep, he is adopted by a peasant woman. Grusha has mixed emotions about this, which change when she meets a perverted Corporal and Ironshirts who are looking for the child. He suspects something about her, and Grusha is forced to knock him out to save Michael. She wearily retreats to her brother's mountain farm. Lavrenti, Grusha's brother, fabricates a story to his jealous wife Aniko, claiming that Michael Abashwili is Grusha's child and she is on her way to find the father's farm.

Grusha catches scarlet fever and lives there for quite some time. Rumours spread in the village, and Lavrenti convinces Grusha to marry a dying peasant, Jussup, in order to quell them. She reluctantly agrees. Guests arrive at the wedding–funeral, including the Singer and musicians, which act as the hired musicians for the event, and gossip endlessly. It is revealed that the Grand Duke is overthrowing the princes and the civil war has finally ended, and no one can be drafted anymore. At this, the supposedly dead villager Jussup returns to "life", and it becomes clear he was only "ill" when the possibility of being drafted was present. Grusha finds herself married. For months, Grusha's new husband tries to make her a 'real wife' by consummating the marriage, but she refuses.

Years pass, and Simon finds Grusha while washing clothes in the river. They have a sweet exchange before Simon jokingly asks if she has found another man. Grusha struggles to tell him she has unwillingly married, then Simon spots Michael. The following scene between the two is told predominantly by the Singer, who speaks for each of the two characters. However, Ironshirts arrive carrying Michael in, and ask Grusha if she is his mother, she says that she is, and Simon leaves distraught. The Governor's Wife wants the child back and Grusha must go to court back in Nukha. The Singer ends the act with questions about Grusha's future, and reveals that there is another story we must learn: the story of Azdak. If an intermission is used, this is generally where it is placed.

=== Scene four: The Story of the Judge ===
The scene opens as if a different play entirely, yet set within the same war setting, is beginning. The Singer introduces another hero named Azdak. Azdak shelters a "peasant" and protects him from authorities by a demonstration of convoluted logic. He later realises that he sheltered the Grand Duke himself; since he thinks the rebellion is an uprising against the government itself, he turns himself in for his "class treason". But the rebellion isn't a populist one – in fact, the princes are trying to suppress a populist rebellion occurring as a result of their own – and Azdak renounces his revolutionary ideas to keep the Ironshirts from killing him as a radical.

The Fat Prince enters, looking to secure the Ironshirt's support in making his nephew a new judge. Azdak suggests they hold a mock trial to test him; the Fat Prince agrees. Azdak plays the accused in the trial – the Grand Duke. He makes several very successful jabs against the Prince's corruption, and amuses the Ironshirts enough that they appoint him instead of the Fat Prince's nephew: "The judge was always a chancer; now let a chancer be the judge!"

Azdak remains himself on the bench. He uses a large law book as a pillow to sit on. What follows is a series of short scenes, interspersed by the "song" of the Singer, in which he judges in favor of the poor, the oppressed, and good-hearted bandits; in one set of cases in which all the plaintiffs and the accused are corrupt, he passes a completely nonsensical set of judgments. But it doesn't last forever; the Grand Duke returns to power, the Fat Prince is beheaded, and Azdak is about to be hanged by the Grand Duke's Ironshirts when a pardon arrives appointing "a certain Azdak of Nuka" as a judge in gratitude for "saving a life essential to the realm", i.e. the Grand Duke's own. "His Honour Azdak is now His Honour Azdak;" the wife of the beheaded governor instantly dislikes him, but decides he'll be needed for the trial in which she'll recover her son from Grusha. The act closes with Azdak obsequious and afraid for his life, promising to restore Michael to the Governor's Wife, behead Grusha, and do whatever else the Governor's Wife wants: "It will all be arranged as you order, your Excellency. As you order."

=== Scene five: The Chalk Circle ===
We have returned to Grusha's story. We meet Grusha in court, supported by a former cook of the Governor and Simon Shashava, who will swear he is the father of the boy. Natella Abashvili comes in with two lawyers, who each reassure her things will be taken care of. Azdak is beaten by Ironshirts, who is told he is an enemy of the state. A rider comes in with a proclamation, stating the Grand Duke has reappointed Azdak as a judge. Azdak is cleaned up and the trial begins. The trial, however, does not begin with Grusha and the Governor's wife, but with a very elderly married couple who wishes to divorce. Azdak is unable to make a decision on this case, so he sets it aside to hear the next case on the docket.

The prosecution comes forth and liberally bribes Azdak in hopes of swinging the verdict. It is revealed that Natella only wants the child because all the estate and finances of the Governor are tied to her heir and cannot be accessed without him. Grusha's defense does not go over well, as it develops into her and Simon insulting Azdak for taking bribes. Azdak fines them for this but, after consideration, claims he can't find the true mother. He decides that he will have to devise a test. A circle of chalk is drawn, and Michael is placed in the center. The true mother, Azdak states, will be able to pull the child from the center. If they both pull, they will tear the child in half and get half each. The test begins but (akin to the Judgment of Solomon) Grusha refuses to pull as she cannot bear to hurt Michael. Azdak gives her one more chance, but again she cannot pull Michael. During this dilemma, a poignant song is sung by the Singer as a reflection of Grusha's thoughts toward Michael. The others on stage cannot hear this, but they feel the overwhelming emotion through Grusha. Azdak declares that Grusha is the true mother, as she loves Michael too much to be able to hurt him. The Governor's wife is told that the estates shall fall to the city and be made into a garden for children called "Azdak's Garden". Simon pays Azdak his fine. Azdak tells the old couple he shall divorce them, but "accidentally" divorces Grusha and the peasant man, leaving her free to marry Simon. Everyone dances off happily as Azdak disappears. The Singer remarks upon Azdak's wisdom and notes that in the ending, everyone got what they deserved.

=== Variants ===
The play is sometimes played without the prologue, and it was always played that way in the US during the McCarthy era. (The first US production to include the prologue was in 1965.) There is some dispute about how integral the prologue is to Brecht's conception of the play. Some claim that he regarded it as an integral part of his play, and it was present in the earliest drafts. Others claim that it was only included in later drafts. However, there is agreement that he originally intended to set it in the 1930s, but later updated it.

=== Music ===
Brecht wrote a number of 'songs' as part of the piece, and one of its main characters is called the Singer. The music for the premiere at Carleton College in 1948 was composed by Carleton student Katherine Griffith, who composed pieces with harp, cello, oboe, bells, and drums. No complete original score exists and the 1948 premiere was not recorded, but there is a disc recording made in 1956 of Griffith's revision of the score for clarinet, cello, and vibraharp intended for a performance at Earlham College in Richmond, Indiana. The tape recording with Griffith's incomplete transcription of the score is at Carleton College and at the Bertolt Brecht Archiv in Berlin. The show is generally played with original music and songs performed by the cast. Many composers have created unique original scores for The Caucasian Chalk Circle. One score performed regularly is by American composer Mark Nichols, who based his music on traditional Georgian folk harmonies in polyphony. Georgian composer Giya Kancheli made an iconic score for the production of Rustaveli Theatre in Tbilisi.

== Setting ==
The setting of the play is clearly Georgia in the Caucasus, although it is described as "Grusinia" (one of the Russian names for the country) in the main play. Most of the characters have Georgian names, and Tiflis and the poet Mayakovsky, who was born and raised in Georgia, are mentioned in the prologue. However the city where much of the action takes place, Nuka, is in modern Azerbaijan, although it was under Georgian rule for a time in the Middle Ages.

Brecht did not necessarily intend his play to be a realistic portrayal of either contemporary or medieval Georgia. Even in the Soviet Union, some people found it more German than Russian or Georgian, and pointed out that it did not accurately portray the decision-making procedures in Soviet agriculture.

== Professional productions ==
- In 2015, a translation of the play into English by Alistair Beaton was staged by the Royal Lyceum Theatre Company, Edinburgh, directed by Mark Thomson.
- In 2022, a production opened Off-West End at the Rose Theatre in Kingston starring Carrie Hope Fletcher in the leading role of Grusha.
- From December 2025, a translation of the play into Hebrew by Noam Shmuel is being staged at the Habima Theater in Tel Aviv in Israel, starring Joy Rieger and Tomer Machloof.
