= Li Qianfu =

Chinese playwright

Li Qianfu (Chinese: 李潛夫), courtesy name Xingdao (行道), was a 14th-century Chinese playwright of the Yuan dynasty. His works include The Chalk Circle (灰闌記) which was used as the basis for Bertolt Brecht's play The Caucasian Chalk Circle (1948). He notably kept much to himself, choosing living a life of seclusion in the countryside. He is said to have died around 1350 AD.
