= Wendy White (mezzo-soprano) =

American mezzo-soprano (born 1953)

Wendy White (born 1953) is an American mezzo-soprano who has had an active international singing career in operas and concerts since the late 1970s. She has performed annually with the Metropolitan Opera since her debut with the company in 1989, and as of April 2011 has appeared in a total of 505 performances at the Met.

== Career ==
Born in Chicago, White is a graduate of Wheaton College (1975, Bachelor of Music) and the Jacobs School of Music of Indiana University (1978, Master of Music). She won the Metropolitan Opera National Council Auditions in 1978. In 1979 she made her debut at the Lyric Opera of Chicago as Smeraldina in Sergei Prokofiev's The Love for Three Oranges. She appeared in two more roles with the company that year: the Countess di Coigny in Umberto Giordano's Andrea Chénier and Giovanna in Giuseppe Verdi's Rigoletto. She later returned to the Lyric Opera as the 3rd Lady in Wolfgang Amadeus Mozart's The Magic Flute (1986), Siébel in Charles Gounod's Faust (1987), Charmian in Samuel Barber's Antony and Cleopatra (1991), Susanna in John Corigliano's The Ghosts of Versailles (1995), and Suzuki in Giacomo Puccini's Madama Butterfly (1997/1998).

In 1982 White portrayed the role of Colombina in Ferruccio Busoni's Harlequin at the Houston Grand Opera. In 1984 she performed the role of Valencienne in The Merry Widow with the Washington National Opera. In 1986 she made her debut at the New York City Opera as Charlotte in Jules Massenet's Werther with Jerry Hadley in the title role. That same year she performed the role of Cherubino in Mozart's The Marriage of Figaro with the Fort Worth Opera. In 1987 she sang the title role in Georges Bizet's Carmen in Orange County, California under conductor Victor Borge. In 1990 she performed the role of Rosina in Gioachino Rossini's The Barber of Seville at the Cincinnati Opera. In 1999 she made her debut at the San Francisco Opera as Suzuki to Sylvie Valayre's Cio-Cio San.

On October 16, 1989, White made her debut at the Metropolitan Opera as Flora in a new staging of Verdi's La traviata with Edita Gruberová as Violetta, Neil Shicoff as Alfredo, Wolfgang Brendel as Germont, and Carlos Kleiber conducting. She has continued to perform annually with the company since, portraying more than 40 roles for the Met. She has appeared on numerous Live from the Metropolitan Opera broadcasts on PBS, including portraying the roles of Bersi in Andrea Chénier, Fenena in Nabucco, Marcellina in The Marriage of Figaro, Margret in Wozzeck, Suzuki, and Tisbe in La Cenerentola for televised performances. Some of her other roles at the Met include Anna in Les Troyens, Annina in Der Rosenkavalier, Baba the Turk in The Rake's Progress, Berta in The Barber of Seville, Brangäne in Tristan und Isolde, Carmen, Cherubino in The Ghosts of Versailles, Death in The Nightingale, Emilia in Otello, Erda and Flosshilde in The Ring Cycle, Federica in Luisa Miller, Giovanna in Ernani, Giulietta in The Tales of Hoffmann, the Innkeeper in Boris Godunov, Isabella in L'italiana in Algeri, the Kitchen Boy in Rusalka, La Cieca in La Gioconda, Larina in Eugene Onegin, Lola in Cavalleria rusticana, Maddalena, Magdalene in Die Meistersinger von Nürnberg, Mary in The Flying Dutchman, the Monitor in Suor Angelica, the Mother in L'enfant et les sortilèges, and Mistress Quickly in Falstaff among others.

On the international stage, White has appeared with several major opera houses in Europe. In 1986 she sang the role of Dinah in Leonard Bernstein's A Quiet Place at the Vienna State Opera; a performance which was recorded for CD release by Deutsche Grammophon. She has also performed roles with the Hamburg State Opera, Opéra de Nice, and the Théâtre du Capitole.

White has also had an active career within the concert repertoire. In August 1987 she was the soloist in Bernstein's Jeremiah Symphony with the Boston Symphony Orchestra at the Tanglewood Music Festival under the baton of the composer. In November 1990 she was the mezzo-soprano soloist in the world premiere of Ned Rorem's oratorio Goodbye, My Fancy with the Chicago Symphony Orchestra and conductor Margaret Hillis. She has also sung in concerts with the Cleveland Orchestra, the Munich Symphony Orchestra, the National Symphony Orchestra, the Netherlands Radio Symphony, the New York Philharmonic, the St. Louis Symphony, and the San Francisco Symphony among others. In 2003 her recording of Michael Linton's Second Cantata, conducted by Jerry Blackstone was released on the Refinersfireus label

On December 17, 2011, during a performance of Gounod's Faust at the Metropolitan Opera in New York, a stage platform collapsed as White was walking onto it. She fell about eight feet and was injured. Ten months later the New York Times reported that she had not recovered from her injuries and felt abandoned by a company she considered family after the company canceled her contract. In August 2013 she sued the company for damages as a result of the accident. According to her lawyer, "She has capitulated to the reality that she's permanently injured and won't get better." In October 2024, after a lengthy legal process which involved the New York State Supreme Court and state legislature, White and the Met reached an undisclosed settlement.

== Videography ==
- James Levine's 25th Anniversary Metropolitan Opera Gala (1996), Deutsche Grammophon DVD, B0004602-09
