= Diego Godoy (tenor) =

Chilean opera tenor (born 1991)

- Born: 29 December 1991 (age 34); Antofagasta, Chile
- Occupation: Opera singer (tenor)
- Years active: 2013–present
- Spouse: Emy Gazeilles (2024–present)

Diego Godoy (born Diego Gonzalo Godoy Gutiérrez, 29 December 1991) is a Chilean operatic tenor, particularly known for his roles in Puccini operas Regarded as the finest Chilean tenor of this decade, he has built a remarkable twelve-year international career, with a repertoire encompassing more than thirty leading roles.. On 20 July 2024, he received the award Révélation Musicale de l'année by the festival Les Escapades musicales.

== Biography ==
Godoy was born in Villa Florida district of Antofagasta, Chile in 1991.

Diego Godoy began his musical career at the age of 14 in Chile. He initially studied with Maestro Rodrigo Tapia and later with mezzo-soprano Graciela Araya at the Ramón Vinay Opera Study Center. At the age of 20, he won the Young Artist Prize at the International Festival of Lyric Singing in Trujillo, Peru. and made his debut as Benvolio in Gounod's Roméo et Juliette at the National Opera of Chile.

Three years later, he performed the role of Azaël in Debussy's L'enfant prodigue at the Sakrale Oper in Berlin and Ferrando in Mozart's Così fan tutte at the Queen's Hall Trinidad and Tobago in Trinidad and Tobago.

That same year, he joined the Opera Studio of the Opéra national du Rhin in Strasbourg, France where he debuted several roles under the guidance of Sylvie Valayre, Umberto Finazzi, and Lionel Sarrazin. He later, in 2017, won the 'International Competition of French Opera of U.P.M.C.F.' in Paris, France.

Today, Godoy continues to perform leading roles in operas ranging from Donizetti to Verdi, as well as in French romantic operas such as Bizet (Don José) and Gounod (Romeo). He has sung in internationally renowned theatres and venues including the Bolshoi Theatre in Moscow; Salle Gaveau, Théâtre des Champs-Élysées, and La Seine Musicale in France; Teatro di San Carlo in Naples, Teatro dell'Opera in Florence, Teatro Donizetti in Bergamo, Teatro Massimo Bellini in Catania, and Teatro Verdi in Pisa in Italy; Konzerthaus, Vienna, and the Tyrolean State Theatre of Innsbruck in Austria; and the Royal Opera House Muscat in Oman.

In 2022, he performed in Verdi's I due Foscari alongside Plácido Domingo, and was a guest soloist at soprano Nadine Sierra's concert at Salle Gaveau in Paris. The year 2023 marked a milestone in his career, portraying the role of the Duke of Mantua in Verdi's Rigoletto at the Cairo Opera House in Egypt, followed by Don José in Bizet's Carmen at La Seine Musicale (France), and making his debut as Manrico in Verdi's Il trovatore at the Japan Opera Festival.

He also participated in the world premiere of the opera La vida es sueño based on Pedro Calderón de la Barca 1636 play in Alcalá de Henares the hometown of Miguel de Cervantes, for the Iberian Festival of Performing Arts. Additionally, he made his debut at the festival Chorégies d'Orange in France as a guest soloist at the 'Musiques en fête' gala and was part of the tribute for the 100th anniversary of the Italian tenor Enrico Caruso.

Godoy continued an extraordinary year with two more productions of Il trovatore in Italy (Teatro Marrucino in Chieti and Teatro Comunale Modena), where he achieved the first encores of his career with "Di quella pira"; Carmen by Bizet at Teatro delle Muse in Ancona; and Maria Stuarda by Donizetti at the Slovak National Theatre.

In 2024, he portrayed Don José in a new production of Bizet's Carmen at the Štátna opera in Banská Bystrica, receiving remarkable success from both the audience and specialized critics. He then made his debut as Ruggero in Puccini's La rondine at the Gattières Festival of the Nice Opera; and performed Manrico in Il trovatore at the Staatstheater Braunschweig, Germany, while also returning to 'Musiques en fête' in 2024.

His international career has taken him to prestigious stages including the Bolshoi Theatre in Moscow, the Théâtre des Champs-Élysées in Paris, the Teatro di San Carlo in Naples, the Teatro del Maggio Musicale Fiorentino in Florence, the Wiener Konzerthaus, the Royal Opera House Muscat, the Chorégies d'Orange, the Cairo Opera House, and the Japan Opera Festival.

During the 2024–2025 season, Godoy performed Manrico in Verdi's Il trovatore alongside Anna Netrebko at the Chorégies d'Orange, as well as at the Staatstheater Braunschweig. He appeared as Don José in Carmen at the Staatstheater Kassel and as Mario Cavaradossi in Tosca at the National Theatre in Bratislava. He also portrayed Ferdinand in Thomas Adès' The Tempest and returned to Kassel as Don José, a role he has performed more than thirty times across Europe.

In June 2025, he participated for the third consecutive year in Musiques en Fête, the internationally televised opening gala of the Chorégies d'Orange. In September, he returned to Slovakia as Don José. The following month, he made his highly anticipated role debut as Calaf in Puccini's Turandot at the National Opera and Ballet Theatre of Moldova in Chișinău, where he was also invited as a special guest to the gala celebrating the 90th anniversary of the legendary soprano Maria Bieșu. Following these appearances, he returned to the same theatre in November to perform Mario Cavaradossi in Puccini's Tosca.

In 2026, Godoy made his debut at the Staatsoper Stuttgart as Calaf in a new production of Puccini's Turandot, conducted by Valerio Galli and directed by Anna-Sophie Mahler. His performance received outstanding acclaim from the German, French, and international press, marking a significant milestone in his artistic career and further establishing his reputation in the dramatic tenor repertoire.

He received the award for 'Musical Revelation of the Year in France', awarded by the Escapades Musicales Festival of Arcachon and the ENGIE Foundation. In 2025, he is scheduled to perform as Rodolfo in Puccini's La bohème at the Grand Avignon Opera House.
