= Juan Pons =

Spanish baritone (born 1946)

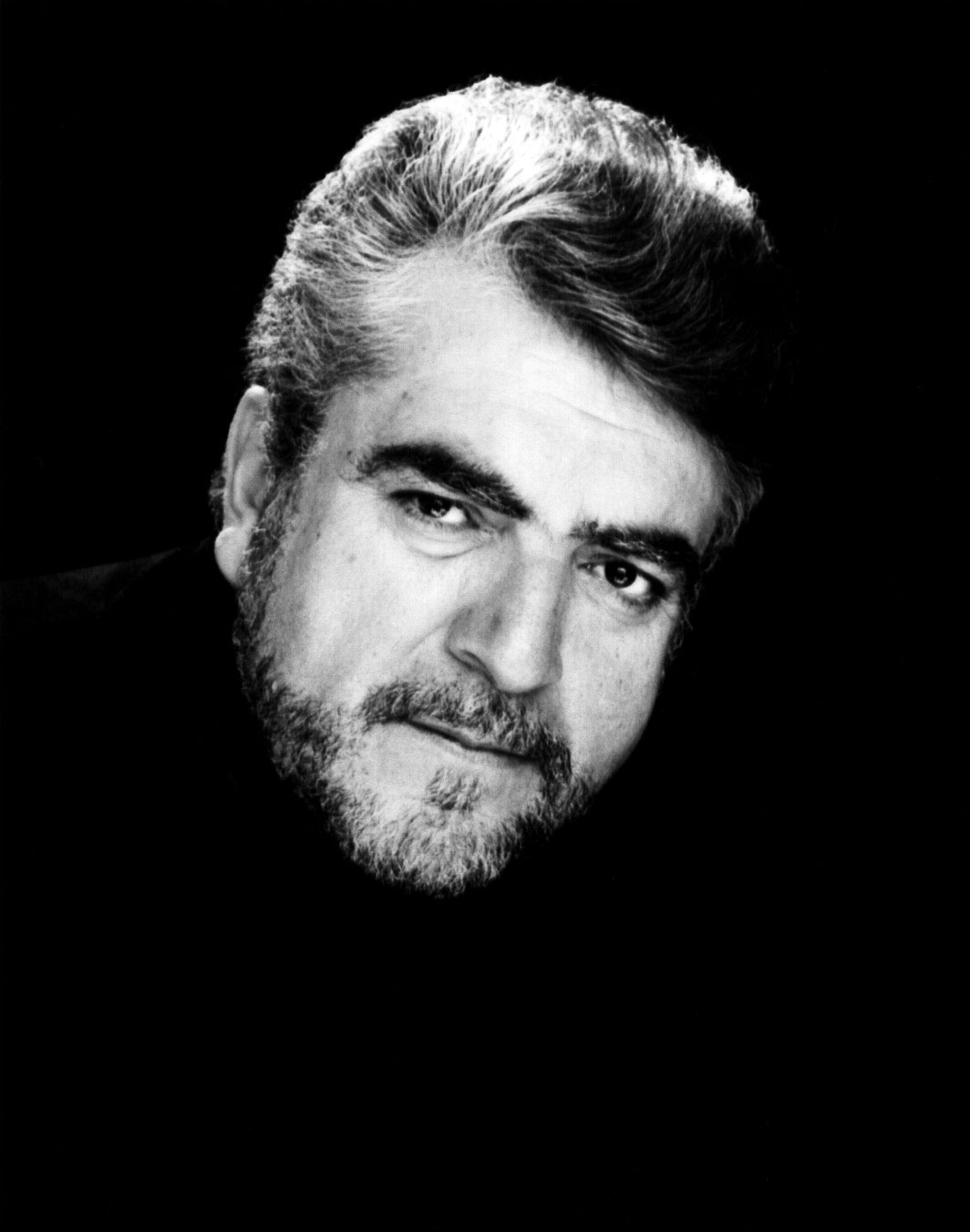

Joan Pons Álvarez (Ciutadella, Spain, 8 August 1946) is a Spanish operatic baritone, known internationally as Juan Pons. He is most famous for his Verdi roles.

== Career ==
Pons made his international début in 1980 at the Teatro alla Scala of Milan with Falstaff, staged by Giorgio Strehler and conducted by Lorin Maazel. Since then, he has been a guest of the most important theatres all over the world, including the Metropolitan Opera House of New York, the Vienna Staatsoper, Covent Garden in London, the Opéra of Paris, Zürich, the Liceo in Barcelona and the Arena of Verona.

His repertoire includes all the main baritone roles. Besides Falstaff, a role he played in 1993 at the La Scala under Riccardo Muti on the occasion of the centennial anniversary of its first performance, he has interpreted many of Verdi's most important baritone roles in Il trovatore, Aida, Ernani, Un ballo in maschera, Rigoletto, La forza del destino, La traviata, Simon Boccanegra, Nabucco and Macbeth. He has performed in Leoncavallo's Pagliacci, Mascagni's Cavalleria rusticana and Puccini's Tosca, Gianni Schicchi, Il tabarro, La fanciulla del West and Madama Butterfly.

Besides the mainstream repertoire, Juan Pons has also sung less well-known works such as Aroldo, Hérodiade, Roberto Devereux and Respighi's La fiamma.

As of 2011, Juan Pons has sung 337 performances at the Metropolitan Opera House in New York City.

In the 1997–98 season he was in a production of Sly by Wolf-Ferrari alongside José Carreras, as well as in Giordano's La Cena delle Beffe, both productions presented at the Zurich Opera. Furthermore, he sang Aida at the Teatro Real of Madrid. In the summer of 1998 he sang in a production of Pagliacci staged by Liliana Cavani and conducted by Riccardo Muti alongside Plácido Domingo at the Ravenna Festival, to which he later returned in 2001 as Falstaff, once again under the baton of Muti.

In 2002 he appeared in Sly and Rigoletto at the Metropolitan Opera House, in Madama Butterfly in Tokyo under the baton of Myung-whun Chung and in Simon Boccanegra at the Opéra Bastille of Paris. His commitments for 2003 included: Madama Butterfly at the Teatro Comunale in Florence, Andrea Chénier and Simon Boccanegra at the Teatro Regio di Torino, La Gioconda and Don Carlos at the Zurich Opera, Otello at the New National Theatre Tokyo, Aida at the Liceo of Barcelona.

During 2004 he sang Aida, Rigoletto, Cavalleria rusticana and Pagliacci at the Metropolitan Opera, Macbeth at the Liceo of Barcelona, Madama Butterfly at the Arena of Verona, at the Torre del Lago Puccini Festival and on a tour in Japan with the same festival, La fanciulla del West and La traviata at the Zurich Opera and Aida, Nabucco, and Tosca at the Vienna Staatsoper.

In 2005 he recorded Puccini's Edgar with Plácido Domingo with Deutsche Grammophon.

== Videography ==
- James Levine's 25th Anniversary Metropolitan Opera Gala (1996), Deutsche Grammophon DVD, B0004602-09

== Bibliography ==
- Antoni Pizà, Bartomeu Amengual, Luciano Pavarotti: Bravo Joan Pons (Palma de Mallorca: Documenta Balear, 2001) ISBN 84-95694-23-9
