= James Morris (bass-baritone) =

American opera singer

James Peppler Morris (born 10 January 1947) is an American bass-baritone opera singer. He is known for his interpretation of the role of Wotan in Richard Wagner's operatic cycle, Der Ring des Nibelungen. The Metropolitan Opera video recording of the complete cycle with Morris as Wotan has been described as an "exceptional issue on every count." It was broadcast on PBS in 1990, to the largest viewing audience of the Ring Cycle in human history.

== Life and career ==
James Morris was born in Baltimore, Maryland on January 10, 1947. There he studied voice privately with Rosa Ponselle and at the Peabody Conservatory. After graduating from Peabody he entered the Academy of Vocal Arts in Philadelphia, Pennsylvania where he was a student of Nicola Moscano. He also attended the University of Maryland. He made his debut with the Baltimore Opera in 1967, as Crespel in Jacques Offenbach's The Tales of Hoffmann, which starred Beverly Sills and Norman Treigle.

He first appeared in New York City at the Metropolitan Opera, in January 1971, as The King in Verdi's Aïda. He went on to perform a repertoire ranging from Mozart through Verdi and Wagner to Benjamin Britten.

In January 2008, he reprised the role of Wotan in a production of Die Walküre at the Metropolitan Opera, the theater with which he is most closely associated. In 2009, alongside Deborah Voigt, he also returned there to sing the role of Scarpia in Puccini's Tosca.

His interpretations can be heard on a number of recordings. He lives in Warren Township, New Jersey with his wife, mezzo-soprano Susan Quittmeyer, and their twins, Jennifer and Daniel. He also has a daughter, Heather.

As of August 2015, Morris is a faculty member at the Manhattan School of Music.

== Awards and notable recordings ==
- 1990 Grammy Award for Best Opera Recording: Richard Wagner's Die Walküre, with the Metropolitan Opera Orchestra.
- 1991 Grammy Award for Best Opera Recording: Richard Wagner's Das Rheingold, with the Metropolitan Opera Orchestra.
- Available on DVD, Die Meistersinger von Nürnberg by Richard Wagner, with the Metropolitan Opera Orchestra, conducted by James Levine. Sung by James Morris, Karita Mattila and Ben Heppner, etc. Produced by Deutsche Grammophon.
- Available on DVD, Otello by Giuseppe Verdi, with the Metropolitan Opera Orchestra, conducted by James Levine. Sung by Plácido Domingo, Renée Fleming and James Morris, etc. Produced by Deutsche Grammophon.
- Available on DVD, Luisa Miller by Giuseppe Verdi, with the Metropolitan Opera Orchestra, conducted by James Levine. Sung by Bonaldo Giaiotti, Plácido Domingo, Jean Kraft, Sherrill Milnes, James Morris and Renata Scotto, etc. Produced by Deutsche Grammophon.
- Available on DVD, James Levine's 25th Anniversary Metropolitan Opera Gala, with the Metropolitan Opera Orchestra, conducted by James Levine. Produced by Deutsche Grammophon.
