= Hong Hei-kyung =

South Korean soprano (born 1959)

- Hangul: 홍혜경
- Hanja: 洪惠卿
- RR: Hong Hyegyeong
- MR: Hong Hyegyŏng

Hong Hei-Kyung (born July 4, 1959), often known in the west as Hei-Kyung Hong, is a South Korean operatic lyric soprano.

== Early life ==
Hong was born in Gangwon, South Korea, and studied at Yea Won Music School in Seoul. Through scholarships she went to the United States alone at age 15 to study at the Juilliard School of Music in New York and its American Opera Center. While at Juilliard, she appeared in a number of productions with the American Opera Center. At the Juilliard School of Music she also participated in the master classes of Tito Gobbi, Elisabeth Schwarzkopf, Walter Legge, and Gérard Souzay. She later studied voice privately with Shirlee Emmons. She was one of four young singers invited to attend Herbert von Karajan's opera classes at the 1983 Salzburg Festival.

== Career ==
In 1981, she sang professionally for the first time when composer Gian Carlo Menotti invited her to perform at the Spoleto Festival in Italy and Charleston, South Carolina, United States. At first, she used the stage name "Suzanne Hong" because Kurt Adler of Juilliard suggested she use a name that could easily be pronounced by English speakers. However, Hong quickly reverted to her given Korean name after the Spoleto Festival; she said that all her friends in the Juilliard School of Music persuaded her to use "her own beautiful Korean name".

As a winner of the 1982 Metropolitan Opera National Council Auditions, she made her Metropolitan Opera debut as Servilia in Mozart's opera La clemenza di Tito on November 17, 1984. Beginning with minor roles such as the Celestial Voice in Don Carlo, Virgin in Samson and Barbarina in Le nozze di Figaro, she got to sing a major role for the first time at the Met – Mimì in La bohème on January 7, 1987. Since then, she has gradually moved into main roles such as Susanna in Le nozze di Figaro, Adina in L'elisir d'amore, and Gilda in Rigoletto. Since the mid-1990s she has specialized in more lyric roles including Liù in Turandot and Countess Almaviva in Le nozze di Figaro.

Like many non-Italian and non-German singers, she has not been tied to operas of specific languages; her repertoire includes Italian (Verdi, Puccini, Donizetti), German (Handel, Mozart, Beethoven, Wagner) and French (Bizet, Gounod, Offenbach). But Mozart occupies the most important place in her repertoire; beside three roles in Le nozze di Figaro – Countess Almaviva (30 performances), Susanna (10 performances) and Barbarina (8 performances), she has sung Zerlina in Don Giovanni (29 performances), Despina in Così fan tutte (14 performances), Servilia in La clemenza di Tito (11 performances), Pamina in Die Zauberflöte (9 performances), and Ilia in Idomeneo (9 performances). Among the roles she has sung (but not at the Met), are the title role in Massenet's Manon, Musetta in La bohème, Tatyana in Eugene Onegin and Leila in Les pêcheurs de perles.

Although the Met has been her main stage since her debut, after giving birth to her third child she began to sing in Europe as well. She has sung at various opera houses including the Royal Opera House in London (as Mimì and Liù), Vienna State Opera (as Mimì), Bavarian State Opera in Munich (as Mimì), Opéra Bastille in Paris (as Liù, Countess Almaviva, Micaëla in Carmen), Verona Arena (as Micaëla), Rome Opera House (as Liù). On January 28, 2003, she made her debut at La Scala in Milan as Musetta in La bohème. She returned to La Scala as Liù in Turandot (January 2004) and Mimì in La bohème (June 2005).

On June 4, 2006, she sang Violetta in La traviata at the Met, becoming the first Asian soprano to sing the role at the Met. And on March 1, 2007, she sang Eva in Die Meistersinger von Nürnberg at the Met for the first time. According to the Metropolitan Opera homepage, through September 2015, her most frequently sung role at the Met has been Mimì in La bohème (64 performances), followed by Micaëla in Carmen (35 performances), Liù in Turandot (33 performances) and Countess Almaviva in Le nozze di Figaro (30 performances).

Hong also has wide experience in orchestral repertoire. She has sung Bach with Trevor Pinnock and the Montreal Symphony, and the conductor and composer Giuseppe Sinopoli wrote his Lou Salome Suite for her, which they premiered together with the New York Philharmonic. She has appeared with the Boston Symphony, the Cleveland Orchestra, the Chicago Symphony, the Philadelphia Orchestra, and many others under conductors such as Charles Dutoit, Mariss Jansons, Seiji Ozawa, André Previn, and Lorin Maazel, with whom she sang the final scene from Strauss' Daphne for the Bayerische Rundfunk.

== Personal life ==
Hong is a Christian whose grandparents were elders at a Presbyterian church in Gwangju.

Hong was featured on the June 2007 cover of Opera News magazine.

Hong's husband was diagnosed with cancer in December 2007 and died in July 2008. Having cancelled her whole schedule at the time of his diagnosis to care for him, she was away from the stage for two years in mourning. She returned to the stage of the Met as Violetta in La traviata on April 13, 2010. She currently lives in Queens, New York, United States with her three children.

== Awards ==
- Ho-Am Prize in the Arts (2014)

== Repertoire at the Met ==
Hei-kyung Hong's career at the Met (updated through December 31, 2015):

Wolfgang Amadeus Mozart

- Le nozze di Figaro: Countess Almaviva (30 performances), Susanna (10 performances), Barbarina (8 performances)
- Don Giovanni: Zerlina (29 performances)
- Così fan tutte: Despina (14 performances)
- La clemenza di Tito: Servilia (11 performances)
- Die Zauberflöte : Pamina (9 performances)
- Idomeneo: Ilia (9 performances)

Giacomo Puccini

- La bohème: Mimì (64 performances)
- Turandot: Liù (33 performances)
- Gianni Schicchi: Lauretta (5 performances)

Giuseppe Verdi

- Don Carlo: Celestial Voice (26 performances)
- La traviata: Violetta (13 performances) / Beside the 13 performances, she sang in 1 performance for Acts 2 and 3 only on April 21, 2012.
- Rigoletto: Gilda (7 performances) / Besides the 7 performances, she sang in 1 performance for Act 1 only on January 4, 1991.

Georges Bizet

- Carmen: Micaëla (35 performances)

Richard Wagner

- Das Rheingold: Freia (10 performances)
- Die Meistersinger von Nürnberg: Eva (4 performances)

Ludwig van Beethoven

- Fidelio: Marzelline (12 performances)

George Frideric Handel

- Samson: Virgin (8 performances)
- Giulio Cesare : Cleopatra (1 performance)

John Corigliano

- The Ghosts of Versailles: Rosina (6 performances)

Jacques Offenbach

- Les contes d'Hoffmann: Antonia/Stella (4 performances)

Gaetano Donizetti

- L'elisir d'amore: Adina (3 performances)

Charles Gounod

- Roméo et Juliette: Juliette (9 performances)

She has also appeared at the Met in four concerts and two gala performances.

== Videography ==
- James Levine's 25th Anniversary Metropolitan Opera Gala (1996), Deutsche Grammophon DVD, B0004602-09
