= Shirlee Emmons =

American opera singer

Shirlee Emmons

Shirlee Emmons (August 5, 1923 – April 16, 2010) was an American classical soprano, voice teacher, and author on vocal pedagogy. She began her career in the early 1940s as a concert soprano, eventually becoming one of the original singers in the Robert Shaw Chorale in 1948. She branched out into opera in the 1950s; performing mainly with regional companies in the United States. She achieved several honours as a performer, including winning the Marian Anderson Award in 1953 and an Obie Award in 1956.

In 1964 Emmons abandoned her career as a singer to begin a second career as a voice teacher which lasted until her death 46 years later. She taught on the faculties of several universities, including Boston University and Princeton University, and gave masterclasses and guest lectures at schools like the University of California and Westminster Choir College. Several of her students have had successful singing careers, including Metropolitan Opera stars Harolyn Blackwell and Hei-Kyung Hong. She co-authored 4 books on the art of singing, penned a biography on tenor Lauritz Melchior, and also contributed articles to numerous music publications.

== Early life and education ==
Born in Stevens Point, Wisconsin, Emmons was the daughter of Myron Emmons and Irene Emmons (née Kortendick). She attended P.J. Jacobs High School in her native town from which she graduated in 1940. She then entered Lawrence University in Appleton, Wisconsin where she earned a Bachelor of Music degree in 1944 and was later awarded an honorary doctorate from the university in 2000. She pursued further studies at the Curtis Institute of Music under Elisabeth Schumann and studied in New York City with William Herman. In 1950 she was awarded a Fulbright Scholarship which enabled her to study opera in Italy at the University for Foreigners Perugia and with conductor Mario Cordone at the Music Conservatoire "Giuseppe Verdi", Milan. She later studied with Berton Coffin and at the University of Mary Washington.

== Singing career ==
Emmons began her career as a concert soprano in cities in Wisconsin, Minnesota, and in Chicago in the early 1940s. In 1947 she gave her first performance in New York City as the soprano soloist in Ludwig van Beethoven's Mass in C major with the Collegiate Chorale under conductor Robert Shaw at Town Hall. She performed with that choir and Shaw again at Town Hall in the world premiere of Peter Mennin's Symphony No. 4 in 1949. In 1948 she joined Shaw's newly formed Robert Shaw Chorale with whom she performed both as an ensemble member and as a soloist into the early 1950s. She made several recordings with the group on the RCA Victor label. She also appeared as a soloist on a number of occasions with the Dessoff Choirs under conductor Paul Boepple in the 1950s; including appearing with the choir at Carnegie Hall as the soprano soloist in Wolfgang Amadeus Mozart's Mass in C minor (1954, with tenor John McCollum) and George Frideric Handel's Israel in Egypt (1957).

In 1953 Emmons won the Marian Anderson Award and that same year was featured on the very first program of the Lauritz Melchior Show. She also toured Brazil in recital that year under the auspices of the National Music League. In 1955 she sang the title role in Giacomo Puccini's Tosca with the Baltimore Symphony Orchestra. In 1956 she portrayed Guadalena in the American Opera Society's production of Jacques Offenbach's La Périchole at Town Hall with Jennie Tourel in the title role. That same year she portrayed Susan B. Anthony in Virgil Thomson's The Mother of Us All Off-Broadway in New York, a performance for which she won an Obie Award. In 1957 she created the role of Sister Rose Ora Easter in the world premiere of Jack Beeson's opera The Sweet Bye and Bye at the Juilliard School. That same year she sang Fiordiligi in Mozart's Così fan tutte and the title role in Richard Strauss's Ariadne auf Naxos at the Santa Fe Opera. She also sang at the Festival dei Due Mondi in Spoleto, Italy and performed in leading roles with the NBC Opera Theatre.

== Voice teacher and author ==
Emmons abandoned her performance career in favor of teaching in the mid-1960s. She served on the voice faculties of numerous institutions during her lifetime, including Columbia University (1964–1967), Princeton University (1967–1981), Boston University (1982–1989), the American Institute of Musical Studies in Graz (1983, 1985), Rutgers University (1990–1993), the State University of New York at Purchase (1990–1996), and the Queens College and Hunter College of the City University of New York (1990–1997). She was also a visiting professor at Daegu University (1998) and Myongji University (2002), and operated a private voice studio in New York City from 1964 until her death in 2010. Three of her notable pupils were operatic sopranos Harolyn Blackwell, Hei-Kyung Hong, and Patrice Michaels.

In 1994 Emmons became the first female chair of the American Academy of Teachers of Singing, a position she held for several years. She co-authored four books on the art of singing: The Art of the Song Recital, Power Performance for Singers, Researching the Song, and Prescriptions for Choral Excellence. She also wrote a biography on legendary tenor Lauritz Melchior, Tristanissimo, and contributed articles to a variety of music publications; including American Music Teacher, The Classical Singer, The Journal of Voice, The NATS Journal, and The Singer's Foundation Magazine.
