= James Levine's 25th Anniversary Metropolitan Opera Gala =

Concert

- Deutsche Grammophon DVD, B0004602-09
- Genre: Opera
- Directed by: Brian Large
- Starring: James Levine
- Country of origin: United States
- Original languages: Czech, English, French, German, Italian and Russian

Production
- Producer: Louisa Briccetti
- Running time: 293 minutes

Original release
- Network: PBS
- Release: April 27, 1996

James Levine's 25th Anniversary Metropolitan Opera Gala was a concert lasting (including intermissions) approximately eight hours, that the Metropolitan Opera staged in 1996 in honour of its then principal conductor and artistic director. Excerpts from the gala were released by Deutsche Grammophon on a 72-minute CD, a 161-minute VHS videocassette and a 161-minute double Laserdisc in 1996, and on a 293-minute double DVD in 2005.

== Background ==
James Levine made his début at the Metropolitan Opera at the age of twenty-seven. On 5 June 1971, he conducted a matinée performance of Tosca with Grace Bumbry in the title role, Franco Corelli as Cavaradossi and Peter Glossop – also making his Met début – as Scarpia. Levine was the longest serving conductor in the Met's history, becoming its principal conductor in 1973, its music director in 1976 and its inaugural artistic director in 1986. At the time of his gala, he had led the Met in 1,646 performances of sixty-eight operas, twenty-one of which he had introduced into the company's repertoire. He had also notably initiated the Met's series of television broadcasts with a production of La Bohème starring Luciano Pavarotti and Renata Scotto in 1977.

The Met celebrated the silver anniversary of Levine's arrival there with a concert on 27 April 1996. Fifty-eight soloists contributed to a gala that lasted from 6 p.m. until 2 a.m. on the following morning. They performed on three sets: an Ezio Frigerio design for Act 1 of Francesca da Rimini, a gift of Mrs Donald D. Harrington; a Günther Schneider-Siemssen design for Act 2 of Arabella, a gift in part of Mrs Michael Falk; and a Schneider-Siemssen design for Act 2 of Tannhäuser, a gift of the Fan Fox and Leslie R. Samuels Foundation and of the Metropolitan Opera Guild. The gala as a whole was sponsored by Mrs Emily Fisher Landau. Its television broadcast was sponsored by Mrs Harrington, the Texaco Philanthropic Foundation, Inc., and the National Endowment For the Arts, in association with Deutsche Grammophon, the United Kingdom's BBC Worldwide Television, Japan's NHK, Holland's Nederlandse Programma Stichting, Denmark's Danmarks Radio, the Australian Broadcasting Corporation and Sweden's Sveriges Television.

== Performances ==
Performances
Performer(s)	Piece	Opera	Composer	CD?	VHS/Laserdisc?	DVD?
Metropolitan Opera Orchestra	Overture	Rienzi, der letzte der Tribunen ("Rienzi, the last of the tribunes", WWV 49, Dresden, 1842)	Richard Wagner (1813–1883), with a libretto by Wagner after Rienzi, the last of the Roman tribunes (1835) by Edward Bulwer-Lytton (1803–1873)	X mark	check	check
Deborah Voigt (Elisabeth)	"Dich, teure Halle"	Tannhäuser und der Sängerkrieg auf Wartburg ("Tannhäuser and the Wartburg song contest", WWV 70, Dresden, 1845)	Richard Wagner, with a libretto by Wagner after the German legends of Tannhäuser and the Wartburg Sängerkrieg (minstrels' contest)	check	check	check
Vladimir Chernov (Figaro)	"Largo al factotum"	Il Barbiere di Siviglia	Gioacchino Rossini	X mark	X mark	X mark
Frederica von Stade (Cherubino)	Voi che sapete	Le Nozze di Figaro	Wolfgang Amadeus Mozart (1756–1791)	X mark	X mark	X mark
Thomas Hampson (Rodrigo) and Roberto Scandiuzzi (Filippo II)	"Restate!... O Signor, di Fiandra arrivo"	Don Carlo (Paris, 1867)	Giuseppe Verdi (1813–1901), with an Italian libretto by Achille de Lauzieres and Angelo Zanardini, translated from the French of Joseph Méry (1797–1866) and Camille du Locle (1832–1903), after the play Don Carlos, Infant von Spanien ("Don Carlos, Infante of Spain", Hamburg, 1787) by Friedrich Schiller (1759–1805)	X mark	check	check
Renée Fleming (Louise)	"Depuis le jour où je me suis donnée"	Louise (Paris, 1900)	Gustave Charpentier (1860–1956), with a libretto by Charpentier and Saint-Pol-Roux (1861–1940)	check	check	check
Richard Leech (Frederico)	È la solita storia	L'Arlesiana (1897)	Francesco Cilea (1866-1950)	X mark	X mark	X mark
Hei-Kyung Hong (Rosina), Wendy White (Cherubino), Christine Goerke (Marie Antoinette) and Håkan Hagegård (Pierre Beaumarchais)	"Cherubino...", "Now we go back in time"	The ghosts of Versailles (New York, 1991)	John Corigliano (born 1938), with a libretto by William M. Hoffman (1939–2017) after L'autre Tartuffe, ou La mère coupable ("The other Tartuffe, or The guilty mother", Paris, 1792) by Pierre Beaumarchais	X mark	X mark	check
Ghena Dimitrova (Amelia), Franco Farina (Riccardo) and Juan Pons (Renato)	"Ahimè! S'appressa alcun!"	Un ballo in maschera (Rome, 1859)	Giuseppe Verdi, with a libretto by Antonio Somma (1809–1864) after that written by Eugène Scribe (1791–1861) for Gustave III, ou Le bal masqué by Daniel Auber (1782–1871)	X mark	X mark	check
Gabriela Beňačková (Rusalka)	Song to the Moon: "Měsíčku na nebi hlubokém"	Rusalka ("The water spirit", Prague, 1901)	Antonín Dvořák (1841–1904), ), with a libretto by Jaroslav Kvapil (1868–1950) after Undine (1811) by Friedrich de la Motte Fouqué (1777–1843), Den lille havfreu ("The little mermaid", 1837) by Hans Christian Andersen (1805–1875) and the north-west European folk tradition of Melusine	X mark	X mark	check
Angela Gheorghiu (Suzel) and Roberto Alagna (Fritz)	"Suzel, buon di" (Cherry Duet)	L'amico Fritz ("Friend Fritz", Rome, 1891)	Pietro Mascagni (1863–1945), with a libretto by Nicola Daspuro (1853–1941, writing as P. Suardon) and Giovanni Targioni-Tozzetti (1863–1934) after L'ami Fritz by Émile Erckmann (1822–1899) and Pierre-Alexandre Chatrian	X mark	check	check
Ileana Cotrubas (Giuditta)	"Ich weiß es selber nicht... Meine Lippen, sie küssen so heiß"	Giuditta (Vienna, 1934)	Franz Lehár (1870–1948), with a libretto by Paul Knepler (1879–1967) and Fritz Löhner-Beda (1883–1942)	check	check	check
Dolora Zajick (Eboli)	"Ah, più non vedrò... O don fatale"	Don Carlo	Giuseppe Verdi	check	check	check
James Morris (Wotan)	"Leb wohl, du kühnes, herrliches Kind!” (Wotan’s Farewell)	Die Walküre ("The Valkyrie", WWV 86B, Munich, 1870)	Richard Wagner	X mark	check	check
Deborah Voigt (Elvira), Plácido Domingo (Ernani) and Roberto Scandiuzzi (Silva)	"Cessaro i suoni"	Ernani (Venice, 1844)	Giuseppe Verdi, with a libretto by Francesco Maria Piave (1810–1876) after Hernani (1830) by Victor Hugo (1802–1885)	X mark	X mark	check
Roberto Alagna (Nadir) and Bryn Terfel (Zurga)	"Au fond du temple saint"	Les pêcheurs de perles ("The pearl fishers", Paris, 1867)	Georges Bizet (1838–1875), with a libretto by Eugène Cormon (1810–1903) and Michel Carré (1821–1872)	check	check	check
Ruth Ann Swenson (Juliette)	"Je veux vivre dans ce rêve"	Roméo et Juliette (Paris, 1867)	Charles Gounod (1818–1893), with a libretto by Jules Barbier (1825–1901) and Michel Carré after Romeo and Juliet (circa 1593) by William Shakespeare (1564–1616)	check	check	check
Alfredo Kraus (Werther)	"Pourquoi me réveiller"	Werther (Geneva, 1892)	Jules Massenet (1842–1912), with a libretto by Édouard Blau (1836–1906), Paul Milliet (1848–1924) and Georges Hartmann (1843–1900, writing as Henri Grémont) after Die Leiden des jungen Werthers ("The sorrows of young Werther", 1774) by Johann Wolfgang von Goethe	check	X mark	X mark
Jessye Norman (Marguerite)	"D'amour l'ardente flamme"	La Damnation de Faust	Hector Berlioz (1803-1869)	X mark	X mark	X mark
Dawn Upshaw (Susanna)	"Giunse alfin il momento... Deh! Vieni, non tardar"	Le nozze di Figaro ("The marriage of Figaro", K. 492, Vienna, 1786)	Wolfgang Amadeus Mozart, with a libretto by Lorenzo da Ponte after La folle journée, ou Le Mariage de Figaro ("The mad day, or The marriage of Figaro", 1784) by Pierre Beaumarchais (1732–1799)	X mark	X mark	check
Jerry Hadley (Sou-Chong)	"Dein ist mein ganzes Herz"	The Land of Smiles	Franz Lehar	X mark	X mark	X mark
Karita Mattila (Rosalinde) and Håkan Hagegård (Eisenstein)	"Dieser Anstand, so manierlich"	Die Fledermaus ("The Bat", Vienna, 1874)	Johann Strauss II (1825–1899), with a libretto by Karl Haffner (1804–1876) and Richard Genée (1823–1895) after Le réveillon ("The supper party", Paris, 1872) by Henri Meilhac (1830–1897) and Ludovic Halévy (1834–1908), after Das Gefängnis ("The prison", Berlin, 1851) by Julius Roderich Benedix (1811–1873)	check	check	check
Sherrill Milnes (Gerard)	"Nemico della patria"	Andrea Chénier (Milan, 1896)	Umberto Giordano (1867–1948), with a libretto by Luigi Illica (1857–1919) based on the life of the poet André Chénier (1762–1794)	X mark	X mark	check
Waltraud Meier (Isolde)	"Wie lachend sie mir Lieder singen" (Isolde’s Narrative and Curse)	Tristan und Isolde (WWV 90, Munich, 1865)	Richard Wagner, with a libretto by Wagner after Tristan by Gottfried von Strassburg (d. circa 1210)	X mark	check	check
Mark Oswald (Malatesta) and Paul Plishka (Don Pasquale)	"Don Pasquale?... Cheti, cheti, immantinente"	Don Pasquale (Paris, 1843)	Gaetano Donizetti (1797–1848), with a libretto by Donizetti and Giovanni Ruffini (1807–1881) after that written by Angelo Anelli (1761–1820) for Ser Marcantonio (Milan, 1810) by Stefano Pavesi (1779–1850)	X mark	X mark	check
Carlo Bergonzi (Rodolfo)	"Oh! Fede negar potessi agl'occhi miei!... Quando le sere al placido"	Luisa Miller (Naples, 1849)	Giuseppe Verdi, with a libretto by Salvadore Cammarano (1801–1852) after Kabale und Liebe ("Intrigue and love", Frankfurt am Main, 1784) by Friedrich Schiller	X mark	X mark	check
Florence Quivar (Giulietta), Rosalind Elias (Niklausse), Alfredo Kraus (Hoffmann), Charles Anthony (Pitichinaccio), James Courtney (Schlémil), Paul Plishka (Dapertutto) and the Metropolitan Opera Chorus	"Hélas, mon cœur s'égare encore" (Sextet)	Les contes d'Hoffmann ("The tales of Hoffmann", Paris, 1881)	Jacques Offenbach, with a libretto by Jules Barbier, after Les contes fantastiques d'Hoffmann ("The fantastic tales of Hofmann") by Jules Barbier and Michel Carré, after Der Sandmann ("The Sandman", 1816), Rath Krespel ("Councillor Krespel", 1818) and Das verlorene Spiegelbild ("The lost reflection", from Die Abenteuer der Sylvester-Nacht, ["The adventures of New Year's Eve", 1814]) by E. T. A. Hoffmann (1776–1822)	X mark	X mark	check
Sharon Sweet (Leonora) and the Metropolitan Opera Chorus	"Madre, pietosa Vergine"	La Forza del Destino	Giuseppe Verdi	X mark	X mark	X mark
Gwyneth Jones (Turandot) and the Metropolitan Opera Chorus	"In questa reggia"	Turandot	Giacomo Puccini (1858-1924)	X mark	X mark	X mark
Metropolitan Opera Chorus	"Va Pensiero"	Nabucco	Giuseppe Verdi	X mark	X mark	X mark
Samuel Ramey	"Del futuro nel buio discerno"	Nabucco	Giuseppe Verdi	X mark	X mark	X mark
June Anderson (Giselda), Carlo Bergonzi (Oronte), Ferruccio Furlanetto (Pagano) and Raymond Gniewek (violin solo)	"Qui posa il fianco... Qual voluttà trascorrere"	I Lombardi alla prima crociata ("The Lombards in the first crusade", Milan, 1843)	Giuseppe Verdi, with a libretto by Temistocle Solera (1815–1878) after I Lombardi alla prima crociata (1826) by Tommaso Grossi (1791–1853)	X mark	X mark	check
Catherine Malfitano (Tatyana) and Dwayne Croft (Eugene Onegin)	"O! Kak mnye tyazhelo"	Eugene Onegin (Op. 24, Moscow, 1879)	Pyotr Ilyich Tchaikovsky (1840–1893), with a libretto by Tchaikovsky and Konstantin Shilovsky after Eugene Onegin (published serially, 1825–1832) by Alexander Pushkin (1799–1837)	X mark	check	check
Carol Vaness (Fiordiligi) and Susanne Mentzer (Dorabella)	"Sorella, cosa dici?... Prenderò quel brunettino"	Così fan tutte, ossia La scuola degli amanti ("Thus do all women, or The school for lovers", K. 588, Vienna, 1790)	Wolfgang Amadeus Mozart, with a libretto by Lorenzo da Ponte	X mark	X mark	check
Grace Bumbry (Dalila)	"Mon cœur s'ouvre à ta voix"	Samson et Dalila (Op. 47, Weimar, 1877)	Camille Saint-Saëns (1835–1921), with a libretto by Ferdinand Lemaire (1832–1879) after the story of Samson and Delilah in Chapter 16 of the Book of Judges in the Old Testament	check	check	check
Aprile Millo (Amelia)	"Morrò, ma prima in grazia"	Un ballo in maschera (Rome, 1859)	Giuseppe Verdi, with a libretto by Antonio Somma (1809–1864) after that written by Eugène Scribe (1791–1861) for Gustave III, ou Le bal masqué by Daniel Auber (1782–1871)	X mark	X mark	check
Maria Ewing (Serena)	"My man's gone now"	Porgy and Bess	George Gershwin (1898-1937)	X mark	X mark	X mark
Jane Eaglen (Brünnhilde)	"Starke Scheite schichtet mir dort" (Immolation Scene)	Götterdämmerung ("Twilight of the gods", WWV 86D, Bayreuth, 1876)	Richard Wagner	X mark	X mark	check
Frederica von Stade (La Périchole)	"Ah! Quel dîner je viens de faire"	La Périchole ("The Peruvienne", Paris, 1868)	Jacques Offenbach (1819–1880), with a libretto by Henri Meilhac and Ludovic Halévy after Le carrosse de Saint-Sacrement ("The Saint-Sacrement coach") by Prosper Mérimée (1803–1871)	check	check	check
Kiri Te Kanawa (Donna Elvira)	"In quali eccessi, o numi... Mi tradì quell'alma ingrata"	Il dissoluto punito, ossia il Don Giovanni ("The rake punished, or Don Giovanni", K. 527, Prague, 1787)	Wolfgang Amadeus Mozart, with a libretto by Lorenzo da Ponte (1749–1838) after El burlador de Seville y convivado de piedra ("The trickster of Seville and the stone guest", ?1616) by Tirso de Molina (1579–1648)	X mark	X mark	check
Renée Fleming (Feldmarschallin), Anne Sofie von Otter (Octavian) and Heidi Grant Murphy (Sophie von Faninal)	"Hab mir's gelobt"	Der Rosenkavalier ("The knight of the rose", Op. 59, Dresden, 1911)	Richard Strauss (1864–1949), with a libretto by Hugo von Hofmannsthal (1874–1929) after Les amours du chevalier de Faubles by Jean-Baptiste Louvet de Couvrai (1760–1797) and Monsieur de Pourceaugnac (1669) by Molière (1622–1673)	check	check	check
Plácido Domingo (Faust) and Samuel Ramey (Méphistophélès)	"Mais ce Dieu, que peut-il pour moi?"	Faust (Paris, 1859)	Charles Gounod, with a libretto by Jules Barbier and Michel Carré from Carré's play Faust et Marguerite after Faust: Eine Tragödie ("Faust, a tragedy", 1808) by Johann Wolfgang von Goethe (1749–1832)	check	check	check
Renée Fleming (Donna Anna), Kiri Te Kanawa (Donne Elvira), Hei-Kyung Hong (Zerlina), Jerry Hadley (Don Ottavio), Bryn Terfel (Leporello) and Julien Robbins (Masetto)	"Di molte faci il lume... Sola, sola in buio loco" (Sextet)	Il dissoluto punito, ossia il Don Giovanni	Wolfgang Amadeus Mozart, with a libretto by Lorenzo da Ponte (1749–1838) after El burlador de Seville y convivado de piedra ("The trickster of Seville and the stone guest", ?1616) by Tirso de Molina (1579–1648)	check	check	check
Birgit Nilsson	Spoken tribute	N/A	N/A	check	check	check
Metropolitan Opera chorus with James King, Bernd Weikl, John Macurdy (solo recitatives cut from video)	"Wach auf, es nahet gen den Tag!",	Die Meistersinger von Nürnberg ("The mastersingers of Nuremberg", WWV 96, Munich, 1868)	Richard Wagner	X mark	check	check

== Production ==
The gala began at 6PM and ended shortly before 2AM. Around half of the pieces performed were by Mozart, Verdi and Wagner, which Tim Page in The Washington Post felt reflected the choice of operas doing Levine's time in the Opera House, although nineteen other composers were featured. The range of singers included veterans such as 71-year-old Carlo Bergonzi through to newcomers like 32-year-old Roberto Alagna. Renée Fleming was heard three times, the only singer with a solo number to be heard more than twice over the evening.

Neil Crory reviewing the gala on Laserdisc in the Fall 1997 issue of Opera Canada, stated that the programme booklet's cancellation list alone deserved a mention in the Guinness Book of Records. Singers who had to cancel their appearance included Ben Heppner and José Carreras due to scheduling clashes, and several due to health issues, including Cecilia Bartoli, Luciano Pavarotti, Montserrat Caballé, Marilyn Horne, Teresa Stratas, and Nicolai Ghiaurov. Hildegard Behrens also cancelled due to illness however James Jorden, writing in Parterre Box, reported rumours that Behrens had cancelled due to jealousy that Jane Eaglen had "usurped" her repertoire by being given the lengthy Immolation Scene from Götterdämmerung. Kathleen Battle, one of the Met's biggest stars of recent years, did not attend as she had been fired in 1994.

James Levine did not avail himself of the opportunity to make any speeches. Instead, Birgit Nilsson gave the closing speech, which Martin Bernheimer in The Los Angeles Times felt was the "most exhilarating tribute" of the night, ending with some unaccompanied Valkyrie war-cries from Die Walküre. Jorden criticised Levine's decision to take his curtain call in front of a specially designed, autographed drop curtain, advising that Levine's pride would lead to a fall - one of the few direct references in reviews of the gala to the sexual misconduct allegations that would end Levine's career two directions later.

The gala was the last appearance on the Met stage for Bergonzi, Ileana Cotrubas, Gwyneth Jones, Grace Bumbry, and James King.

== Critical reception ==
The gala was positively reviewed overall. Tim Page called it a “glorious, crazy, songful party”, while Martin Bernheimer described it as a "mega-monster concert", a "shameless, shapeless, formless smorgasbord of arias and ensembles", "a parade of disparate singers striking poses in competitive evening attire" in which "the assembled women blew a crescendo of kisses to their beaming boss out front". For Neil Crory it was “the gala-to-end-all-galas”. J.B. Steane, reviewing the CD release in Gramophone in December 1998, wrote: "[o]ut come the stars, one by one or two by two and then six of them in a galaxy. Some have been in the firmament a long time, others are almost new. But all are there ... to pay tribute".

Reviewing Levine’s performance at the podium, Mike Silverman, for ‘’The Associated Press’’, said he "conducted the Met's wonderful orchestra with love and enthusiasm". Bernheimer wrote that Levine’s guidance of the excellent orchestra was “sympathetic if sometimes loud and sometimes inflexible” but that the gala began with a somewhat lethargic treatment of the overture to Rienzi. Page believed that none of the soloists could outshine the orchestra and their conductor. Thanks to Levine, the Met's pit was home to "one of the most responsive and virtuosic ensembles in the world", and it was remarkable that he could "preside so effortlessly and so idiomatically over such a range of musical styles, over so many hours".

Of especial interest to reviewers were two prominent up and coming artists, Roberto Alagna and Angela Gheorghiu [appearing one day after their wedding. To Page, Alagna had "a light, sweet and supple voice of moderate size (some high notes that were both delicate and ringing) and a not inconsiderable dramatic ability", but it was far too soon to bracket him with Carreras, Domingo and Pavarotti. Gheorghiu was much more impressive, with "a voice of unusual and haunting timbre, a distinctive creative personality [and] attention to the sheer phonic sound of the words she sings". Silverman was also impressed by Alagna's "lovely" contribution while Bernheimer felt their duet was, in a positive manner, "refined and sugary".

Silverman praised Renée Fleming "whose soprano voice is as beautiful as any in memory". Crory called Fleming “stunning”, noting an “expressive, detailed” excerpt from Louise, which Page also felt was "luscious and immaculate", and Bernheimer credited Fleming with the most beautiful vocalism of the entire concert. Silverman praised Bryn Terfel’s "ebullient" Leporello and said, of his performance alongside Alagna in the duet from The Pearl Fishers, that Terfel's "booming, mellifluous baritone and utter ease and gracefulness as a performer [marked] him as one in a million". He was "sure to be one of the superstars of the next generation". Page praised Federica von Statde singing “Voi che sapete” from Le nozze di figaro: "Opera has recently offered little more wonderful than von Stade's interpretation of that famous ardent, hormone-crazed pubescent boy". . Crory also found her "hysterically funny" in the tipsy aria from La Périchole. Silverman felt that Jane Eaglen, in the Immolation Scene from Götterdämmerung, was worthy of sharing billing with Birgit Nilsson. Bernheimer made light of Eaglen's appearance, as "a Wagnerian diva straight from a New Yorker cartoon", by means of stressing that it did not much matter what Brünnhilde looked like if she had a voice as overwhelming as a tsunami.

Crory singled out for praise "radiant" Deborah Voigt, and "appropriately sun-filled" Ruth Ann Swenson, while noting Dolora Zajick "brought the house down" in her "O don fatale". Bernheimer concurred with the latter sentiment, saying Zajick sang with "full-throated bravura". Silverman praised Jerry Hadley, Richard Leech, Heidi Grant Murphy, and von Otter, while saying Dawn Upshaw was "typically simple, silvery and winning" in Mozart's "Deh! Vieni, non tardar". Jorden found Domingo still stylish and felt Bryn Terfel acquitted himself well. He highly praised Alfredo Kraus, adored the Karita Mattila and Håkan Hagegård duet, as well as that between Catherine Malfitano and Dwayne Croft. Ultimately, Jorden felt that Carlo Bergonzi stole the show, as the "gold standard" of the night.

Bernheimer gave praise to "strident" Sharon Sweet in La forza del destino and the seductive, flirtatious Watch Duet for Karita Mattila and Hakån Hagegård. He also argued that Plácido Domingo and Samuel Ramey were comfortingly stellar in "Faust", Ramey for once being allowed to perform without baring his chest. Bernheimer opined that Deborah Voigt, Bryn Terfel, Ruth Ann Swenson, Aprile Millo and Gabriela Beňačková were equally impressive in their celestial wattage, that Carlo Bergonzi was touching and elegant in Luisa Miller, and Alfredo Kraus amazed with his suavity and staying power as Werther and Hoffmann, while Raymond Gniewek played an exquisite violin solo in I Lombardi. Finally, he felt that Catherine Malfitano and Dwayne Croft provided one of the evening's most successful passages of authentic music drama in a "pyrexic" scene from Eugene Onegin.

Page reserved his highest praise for Plácido Domingo, combining "magnificent vocalizing and the most acute artistic intelligence" in Ernani and Faust. Also outstanding, he felt, were Carlo Bergonzi and Alfredo Kraus, skillfully making the most of resources depleted by old age; Ileana Cotrubas, "ripely and irresistibly nostalgic" in Giuditta; and Ruth Ann Swenson, compensating for her technical deficiencies in a coloratura showpiece from Roméo et Juliette with character and intelligence. One of the more divisive elements was Waltraud Meier's performance of Isolde's Narrative and Curse. Bernheimer felt Meier sang with "thrilling ferocity" while Jorden was derisive of Meier's vocal abilities and her inaccurate reading of the notes in the score. Silverman found Meier's performance "thrilling" but added that he felt she was a mezzo-soprano venturing into soprano territory, and the stress evident in her highest notes made one anxious as to whether she was pursuing a path that was right for her.

All reviewers had criticisms too. Jorden was unappy with Thomas Hampson's "tiny voice" and Richard Leech sounding tired in the Cilea piece. He felt that Fleming was a "mess", sounding "like a sloshed saloon singer" during "Depuis le jour" and that, while Roberto Alagna's uneven voice showed promise, Angela Gheorghiu's voice was "shot to hell". To Crory, the gala had not been consistent in quality. There were "a few blazing performances", but also "many that merely smouldered and others that simply failed to ignite". Silverman noted that there were very few younger singers although older singers such as Bergonzi, Kraus and Domingo were dominant. Jorden, generally, defended this, feeling the older singers were stronger.

To Silverman, one of the lowlights was "a mannered, diva-ish rendition by Jessye Norman, with high notes that consistently went flat, of an aria from Berlioz's Damnation of Faust". Page believed that the gala's programme was typical of the repertoire of the Levine era but lacked any unifying theme otherwise. It was "a sort of melodious circus – a celestial vaudeville". There were consequently many awkward transitions. For example, Jane Eaglen's noble rendition of the immolation scene from Götterdämmerung was followed by the broad comedy of Frederica von Stade in the tipsy aria from La Périchole; the effect was to "dissipate the solemn afterglow of the one and make the other seem goofy and tasteless". Page further argued that Håkan Hagegård and Karita Mattila were guilty of "campy snickering" in Die Fledermaus, Jerry Hadley perpetrated "vulgar Mario Lanza-isms" in The land of smiles, and that Ghena Dimitrova, Franco Farina and Juan Pons were "third-rate" in Un ballo in maschera. Most dismissively, Page argued that Sharon Sweet's mere appearance at the gala was "difficult to explain".

Bernheimer had numerous complaints. Jessye Norman perpetrated the evening's "most mannered" selection in a "crooned, roared and sighed" performance of "D'amour l'ardente flamme" that was so erratic in pitch as to present Berlioz as bitonal. Grace Bumbry was a wobbly old Dalila, and Gwyneth Jones an even wobblier Turandot. Dawn Upshaw's eloquent ornamentation in a "silver-bell" "Deh! Vieni, non tardar" was jarringly followed by Jerry Hadley slathering on the schmalz in "Dein ist mein ganzes Herz". Maria Ewing "yowled" Gershwin's "My man's gone now" with her hands rather oddly thrust into her pockets. Kiri Te Kanawa's honeyed performance of an aria from Don Giovanni was accompanied by "comic-vamp routines". Ghena Dimitrova, Franco Farina and Juan Pons sang a trio from Un ballo in maschera as though working in some theatre in the provinces. James Morris, on the other hand, raised concerns for the health of his voice by the way in which he delivered Wotan's Farewell in his "fraying basso".

Bernheimer also found time to make critiques of the clothing choices of the luminary performers at this special event. As far as clothing was concerned, the contributors most deserving of an award were Ileana Cotrubas for sporting a "gigantic Christmas bow", Mark Oswald for losing his tie and vest in Don Pasquale and "the various cleavage divas who lent new meaning to the concept of heaving bosoms".

== Broadcast and home media ==
The gala was televised in a live transmission on PBS, and was also broadcast in Australia, Denmark, Japan, the Netherlands, Sweden and the United Kingdom.

In 1996, Deutsche Grammophon released versions of the gala in three formats. Thirteen excerpts were released on a 72-minute CD (catalogue number 449-177-2), accompanied by a 24-page insert booklet with an essay by Cory Ellison in English, French, German and Italian, and with production photographs of Alagna, Terfel, Fleming, Domingo, Ramey, Cotrubas, Zajick, Te Kanawa, Hong, Hadley, Robbins, Swenson, Mattila, Hagegård, Kraus, Bumbry, Voigt, von Stade, von Otter, Murphy, Nilsson and Levine. Twenty excerpts were issued on a 161-minute pair of CLV (constant linear velocity) CX-encoded Laserdiscs (catalogue number 072-551-1) with 4:3 NTSC colour video and digital audio. The same excerpts were issued on a VHS videocassette (catalogue number 072-451-3) with 4:3 PAL colour video and digital audio. Crory felt that the video release made a strong choice in terms of the material chosen for preservation. J.B. Steane's view was mixed. He praised Fleming and Swenson, but the album's senior contributors sounded below their best, and even their younger colleagues never rose to real greatness. Steane speculated this was partly to do with the disc's audio quality. Fleming's and Bryn Terfel's voices did not sound as attractive on the CD as they did when heard in person. Indeed, the playing of the Met orchestra was more enjoyable to listen to than any of the singers.

In 2005, Deutsche Grammophon released thirty-three excerpts from the gala on a 293-minute pair of DVDs (catalogue number B0004602-09), with 4:3 NTSC colour video and audio in PCM stereo and an ersatz 5.1-channel surround sound upmix in both DTS and Dolby Digital. The DVDs include an interview with Levine, a picture gallery and trailers, and are accompanied by a 12-page insert booklet with an essay by Kenneth Chalmers in English only. Numerous contributions were not included on any of the home media releases, including those by Maria Ewing, Gwyneth Jones, Richard Leech, Jessye Norman and Sharon Sweet, while an excerpt from Werther sung by Alfredo Kraus was only on the CD.

== Personnel ==
=== Artists ===
- Roberto Alagna (born 1963), tenor
- June Anderson (born 1952), soprano
- Charles Anthony (1929–2012), tenor
- Gabriela Beňačková (born 1947), soprano
- Carlo Bergonzi (1924–2014), tenor
- Grace Bumbry (1937–2023), mezzo-soprano
- Ileana Cotrubas (born 1939), soprano
- James Courtney, bass-baritone
- Dwayne Croft, baritone
- Ghena Dimitrova (1941–2005), soprano
- Plácido Domingo (born 1941), tenor
- Jane Eaglen (born 1960), soprano
- Rosalind Elias (1930–2020), mezzo-soprano
- Franco Farina, tenor
- Renée Fleming (born 1959), soprano
- Ferruccio Furlanetto (born 1949), bass
- Angela Gheorghiu (born 1965), soprano
- Christine Goerke (born 1969), soprano
- Jerry Hadley (1952–2007), tenor
- Håkan Hagegård (born 1945), baritone
- Thomas Hampson (born 1955), baritone
- Hei-Kyung Hong (born 1959), soprano
- Kiri Te Kanawa (born 1944), soprano
- Alfredo Kraus (1927–1999), tenor
- Catherine Malfitano (born 1948), soprano
- Karita Mattila (born 1960), soprano
- Waltraud Meier (born 1956), soprano
- Susanne Mentzer (born 1957), mezzo-soprano
- Aprile Millo (born 1958), soprano
- Sherrill Milnes (born 1935), baritone
- James Morris (born 1947), bass-baritone
- Heidi Grant Murphy (born 1965), soprano
- Anne Sofie von Otter (born 1955), mezzo-soprano
- Mark Oswald, baritone
- Paul Plishka (born 1941), bass
- Juan Pons (born 1946), baritone
- Florence Quivar (born 1944), mezzo-soprano
- Julien Robbins, bass-baritone
- Roberto Scandiuzzi (born 1958), bass
- Frederica von Stade (born 1945), mezzo-soprano
- Ruth Ann Swenson (born 1959), soprano
- Bryn Terfel (born 1965), bass-baritone
- Dawn Upshaw (born 1960), soprano
- Carol Vaness (born 1952), soprano
- Deborah Voigt (born 1960), soprano
- Wendy White (born 1953), mezzo-soprano
- Dolora Zajick (born 1952), mezzo-soprano
- Raymond Gniewek (1931–2021), concertmaster
- Metropolitan Opera Orchestra
- Metropolitan Opera Chorus
- Raymond Hughes, chorus master
- James Levine (1943–2021), conductor

=== Metropolitan Opera personnel ===
- Gil Wechsler, lighting designer
- George Darden, musical preparation
- Joan Dornemann, musical preparation
- Dennis Giauque, musical preparation
- Kemal Khan, musical preparation
- Robert Morrison, musical preparation
- Kevin Murphy, musical preparation
- Richard Woitach, musical preparation
- Phebe Berkowitz, stage director
- David Kneuss, stage director
- Robin Guarino, assistant stage director
- Catherine Hazlehurst, assistant stage director
- Peter McClintock, assistant stage director
- Fabrizio Melano, assistant stage director
- Paul Mills, assistant stage director
- Stephen Pickover, assistant stage director
- Sharon Thomas, assistant stage director
- Jane Klaviter, prompter
- Donna Racik, prompter
- Susan Webb, prompter
- Thomas H. Connell III, stage manager
- Stephen A. Brown, stage manager
- Gary Dietrich, stage manager
- William McCourt, stage manager
- Raymond Menard, stage manager
- Scott Moon, stage manager
- Stephen Diaz, master carpenter
- George Green, master electrician
- Edward McConway, properties master
- Magda Szayer, wig and hair stylist
- Victor Callegari, make-up artist
- William Malloy, wardrobe supervisor
- Lesley Weston, costume shop head
- Ray Diffen, costume designer
- Sylvia Nolan, costume designer

=== Broadcast personnel ===
- Brian Large (born 1939), director
- Louise Briccetti, producer
- Susan Erben, associate producer
- Jay David Saks, audio producer
- Jay Millard, associate director
- Mark Schubin, engineer-in-charge
- Ron Washburn, technical supervisor and camera operator
- Greg Overton, technical director
- Bill King, audio supervisor
- Michael Shoskes, audio engineer
- Mel Becker, audio engineer
- Paul Cohen, audio engineer
- Jim Jordan, audio engineer
- Susan Noll, video engineer
- Matty Randazzo, video engineer
- Paul Ranieri, video engineer
- William Steinberg, video engineer
- Miguel Armstrong, camera operator
- Juan Barrera, camera operator
- Jim Covello, camera operator
- John Feher, camera operator
- Manny Gutierrez, camera operator
- Jake Ostroff, camera operator
- Manny Rodriguez, camera operator
- Jim Scurti, camera operator
- David Smith, camera operator
- Shaun Harkins, remote camera technician
- Alan Buchner, videotape engineer
- Deborah Cavanaugh, electronic graphics
- Terence Benson, television stage manager
- Rose Riggins, television stage manager
- Karen McLaughlin, score reader
- Victoria Warivonchik, production associate
- Joseph Sbarra, production secretary
- Frances Egler, production assistant
- Aileen Forbes, production assistant
- Brian McCotter, production assistant
- James Simpson, production assistant
- Kevin Wilkin, production assistant
- Laura Tolkow, title graphics
- Jim Naughton, production facilities
- Jim Will, production facilities
- Unitel Mobile Video, production facilities
- David Hewitt, remote recording services
- Phil Gitomer, remote recording services

=== DVD production personnel ===
- Roland Ott, project manager
- Burkhard Bartsch, project coordinator
- Johannes Müller, producer, msm-Studios GmbH, Munich
- Hermann Enkemeier, screen designer, msm-Studios
- Christian Müller, video encoding and authoring, msm-Studios
- Claudia Pohl, AMSI II mastering, Emil Berliner Studios
- Udo Potratz, AMSI II mastering, Emil Berliner Studios
- Sonya Friedman, subtitles
- Eva Reisinger, booklet editor
- Merle Kersten, booklet art director

== Gallery of artists ==
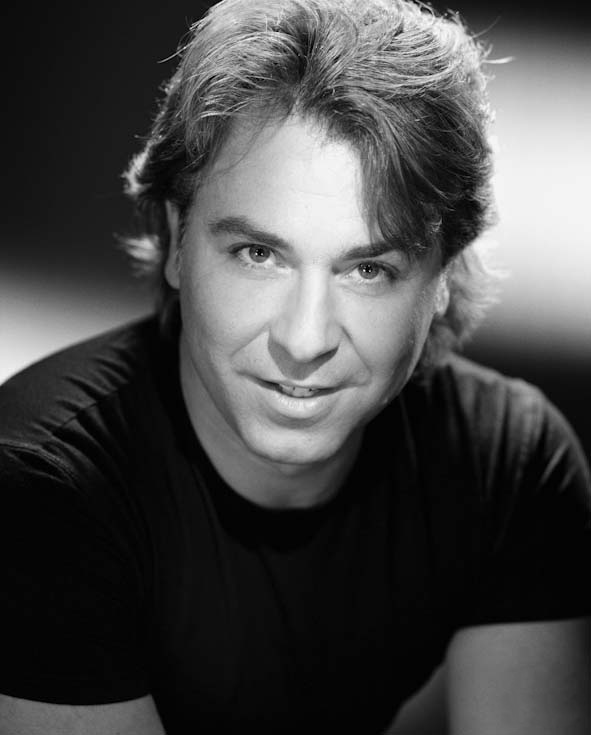
Roberto Alagna

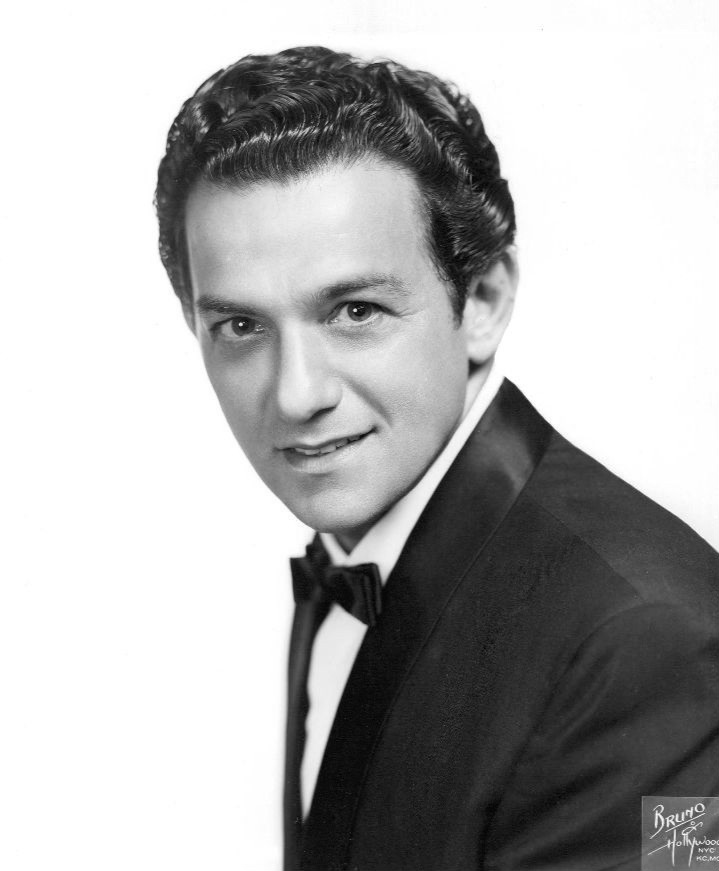
Charles Anthony

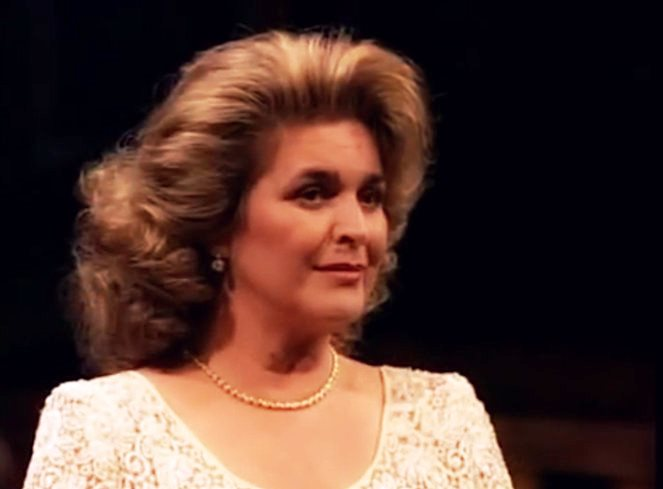
Gabriela Beňačková

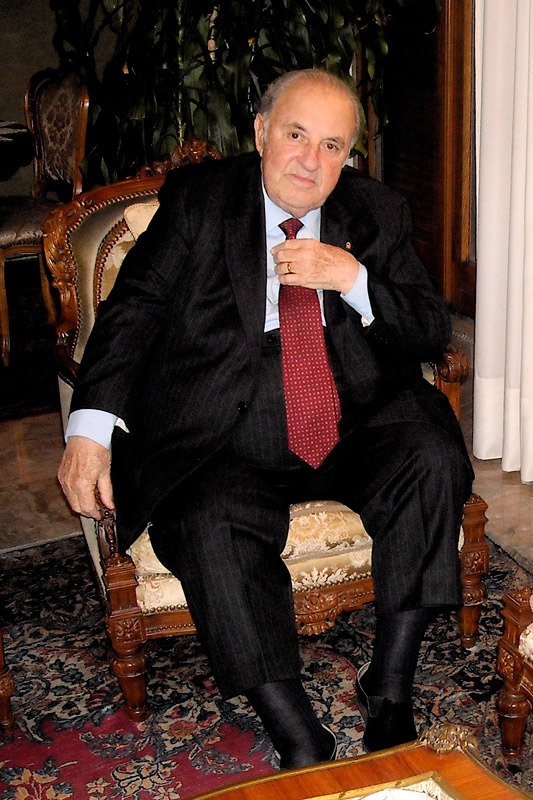
Carlo Bergonzi

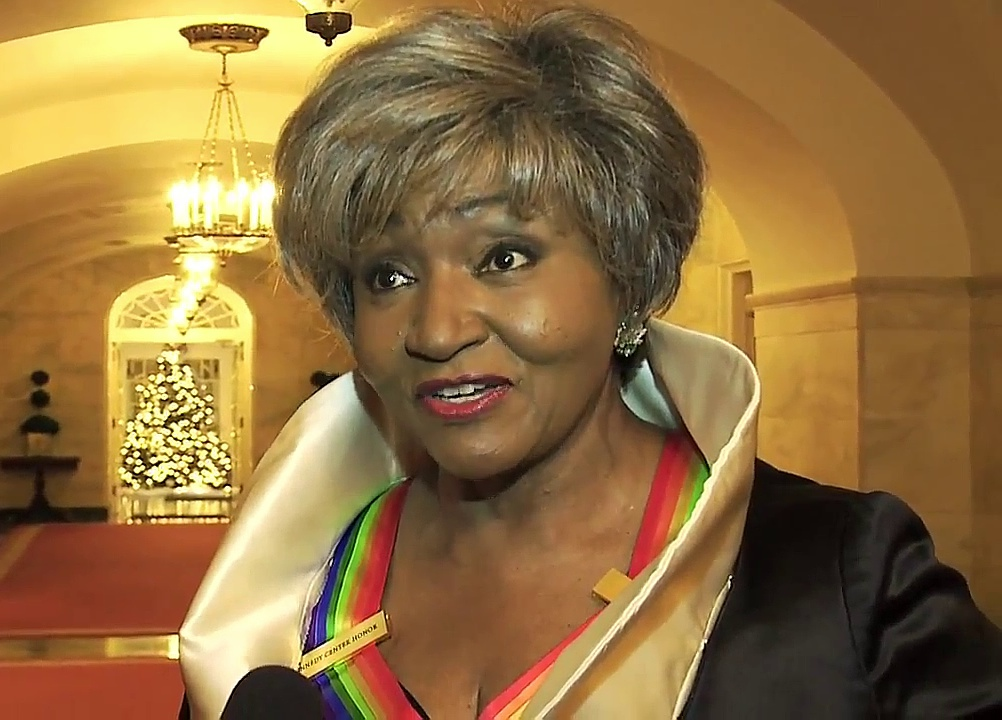
Grace Bumbry

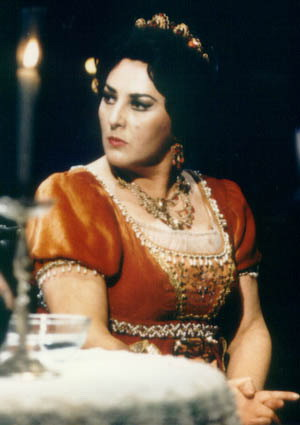
Ghena Dimitrova

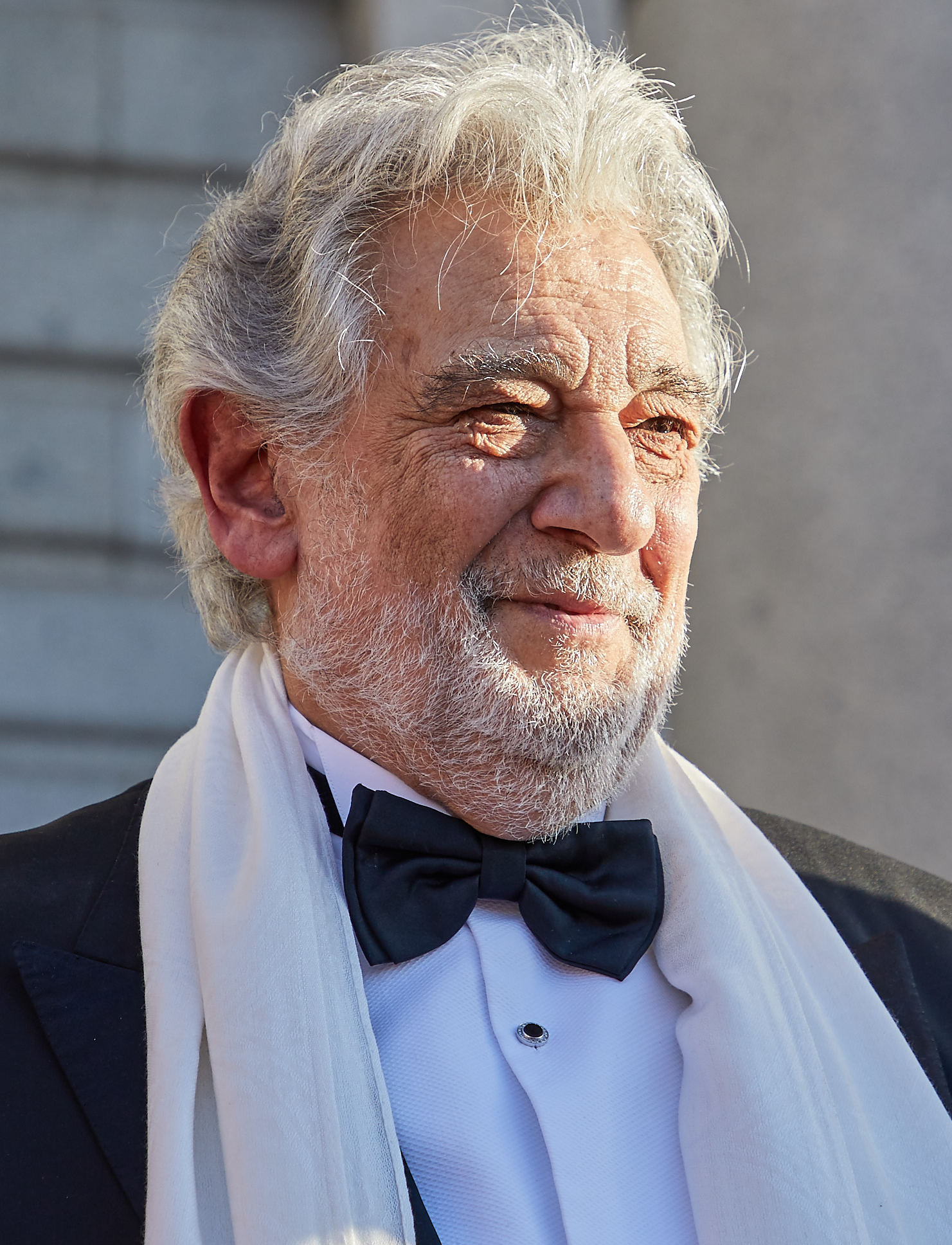
Plácido Domingo

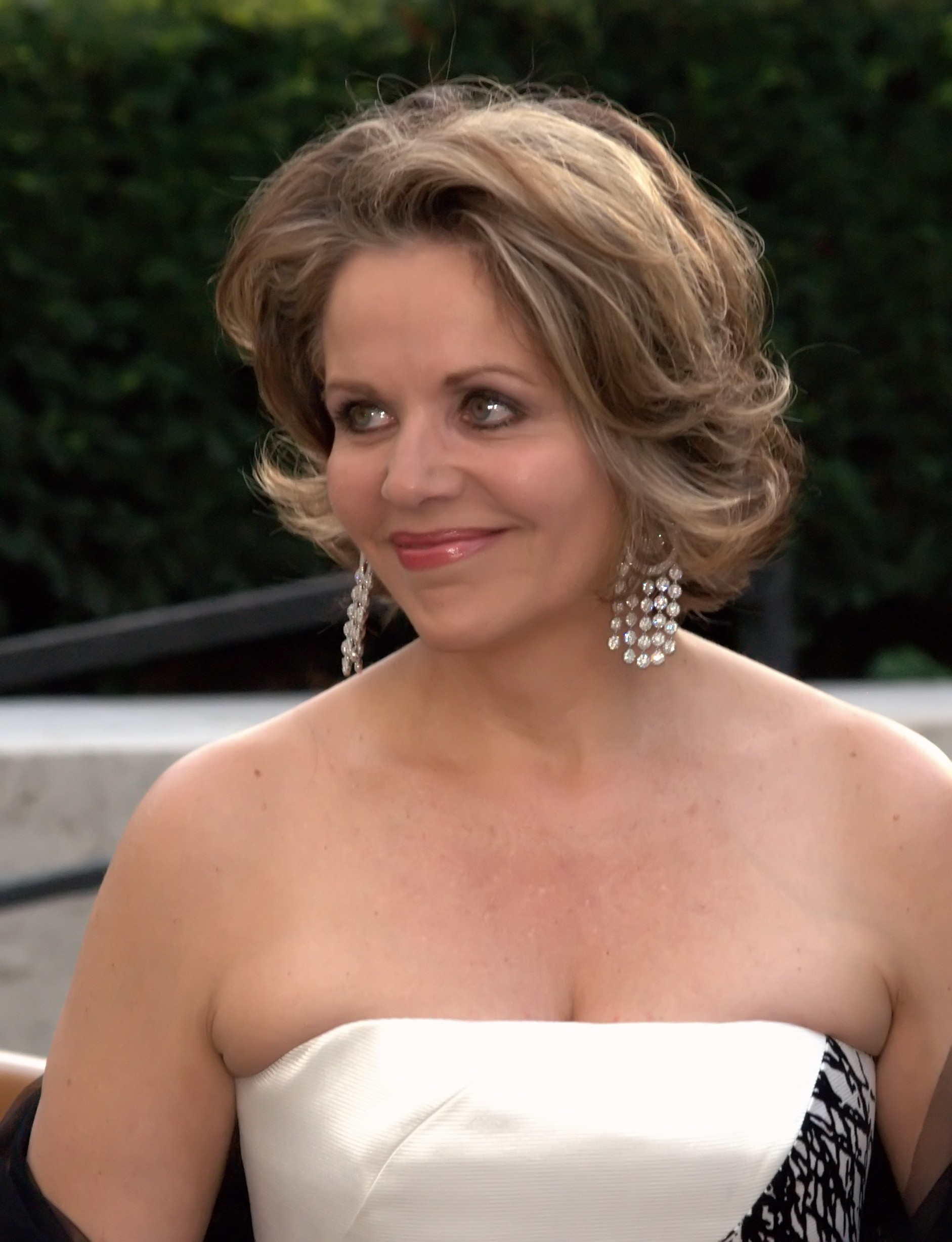
Renée Fleming

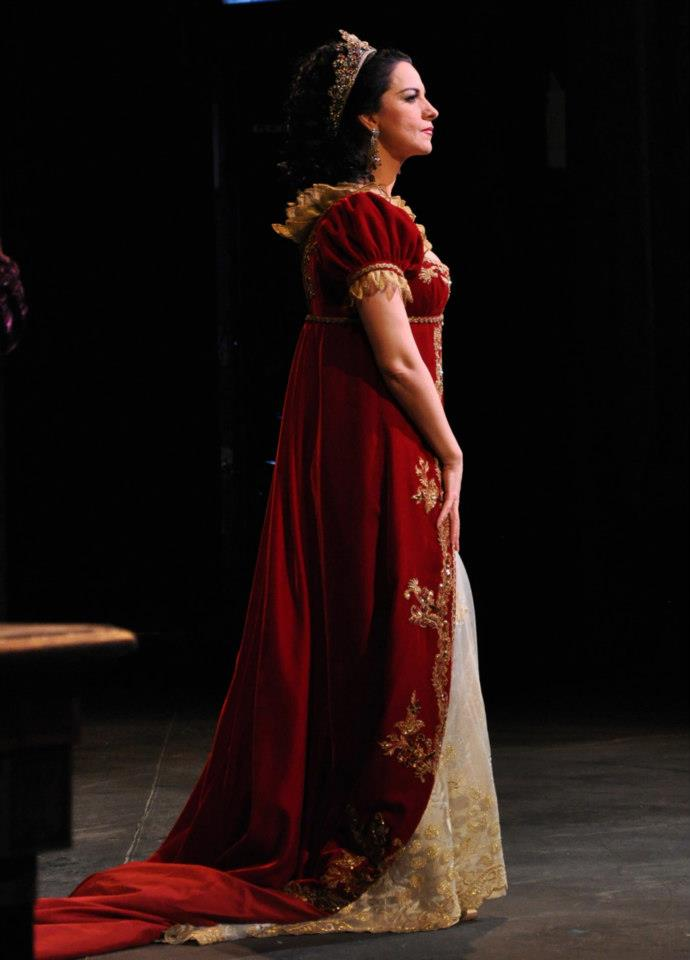
Angela Gheorghiu

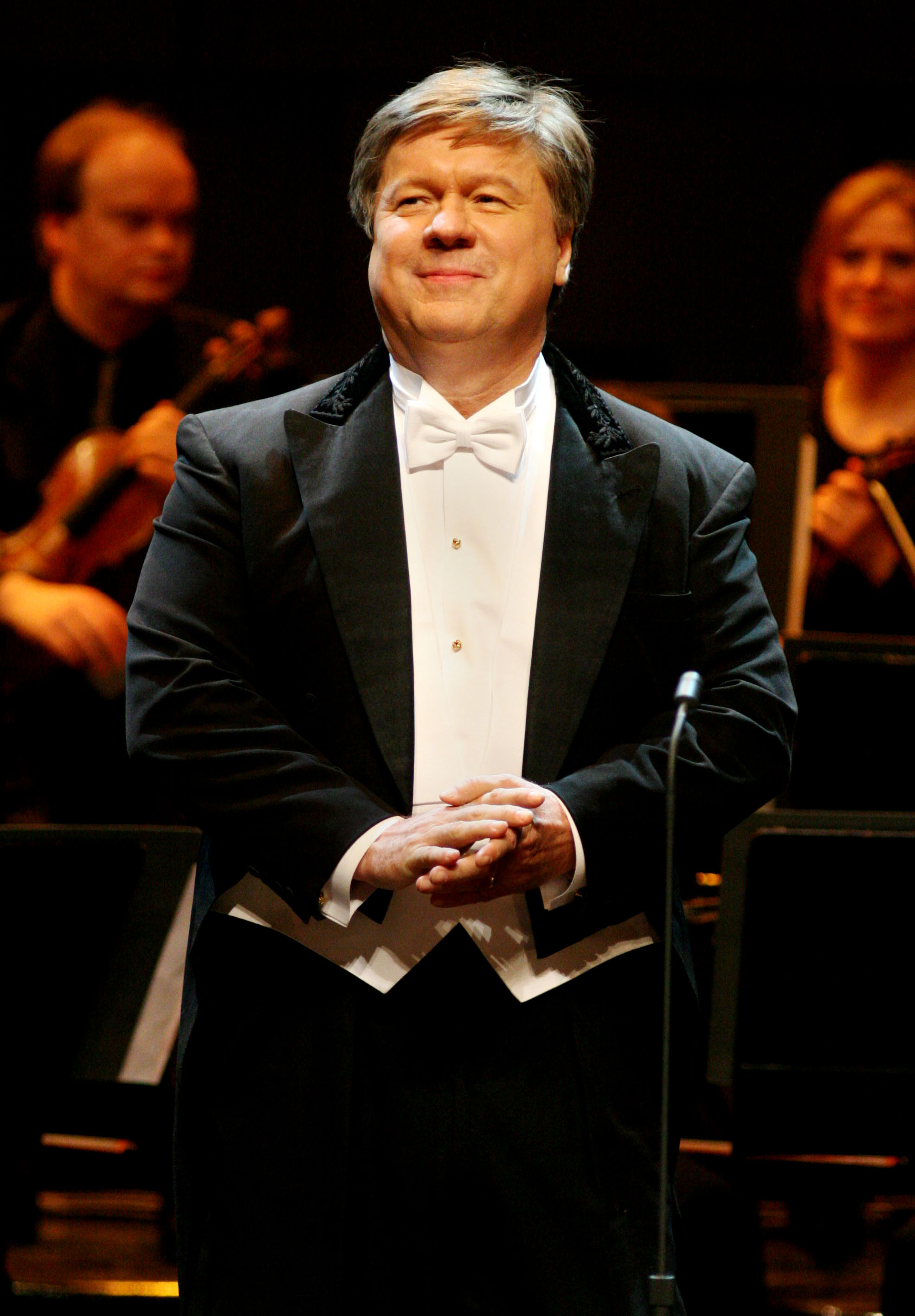
Håkan Hagegård

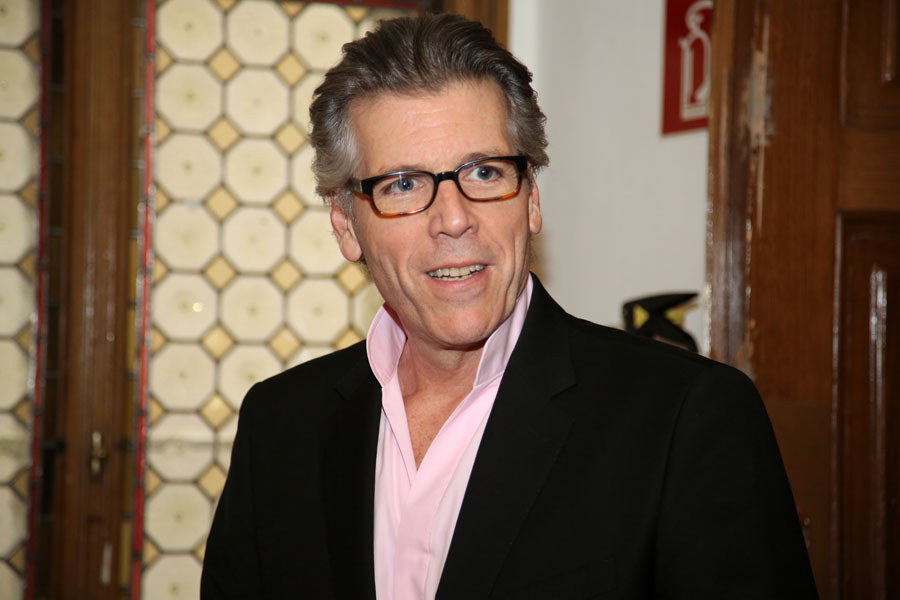
Thomas Hampson

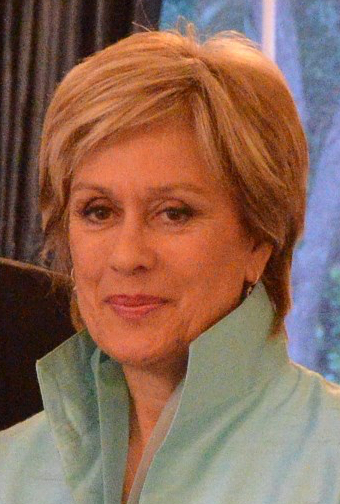
Kiri Te Kanawa

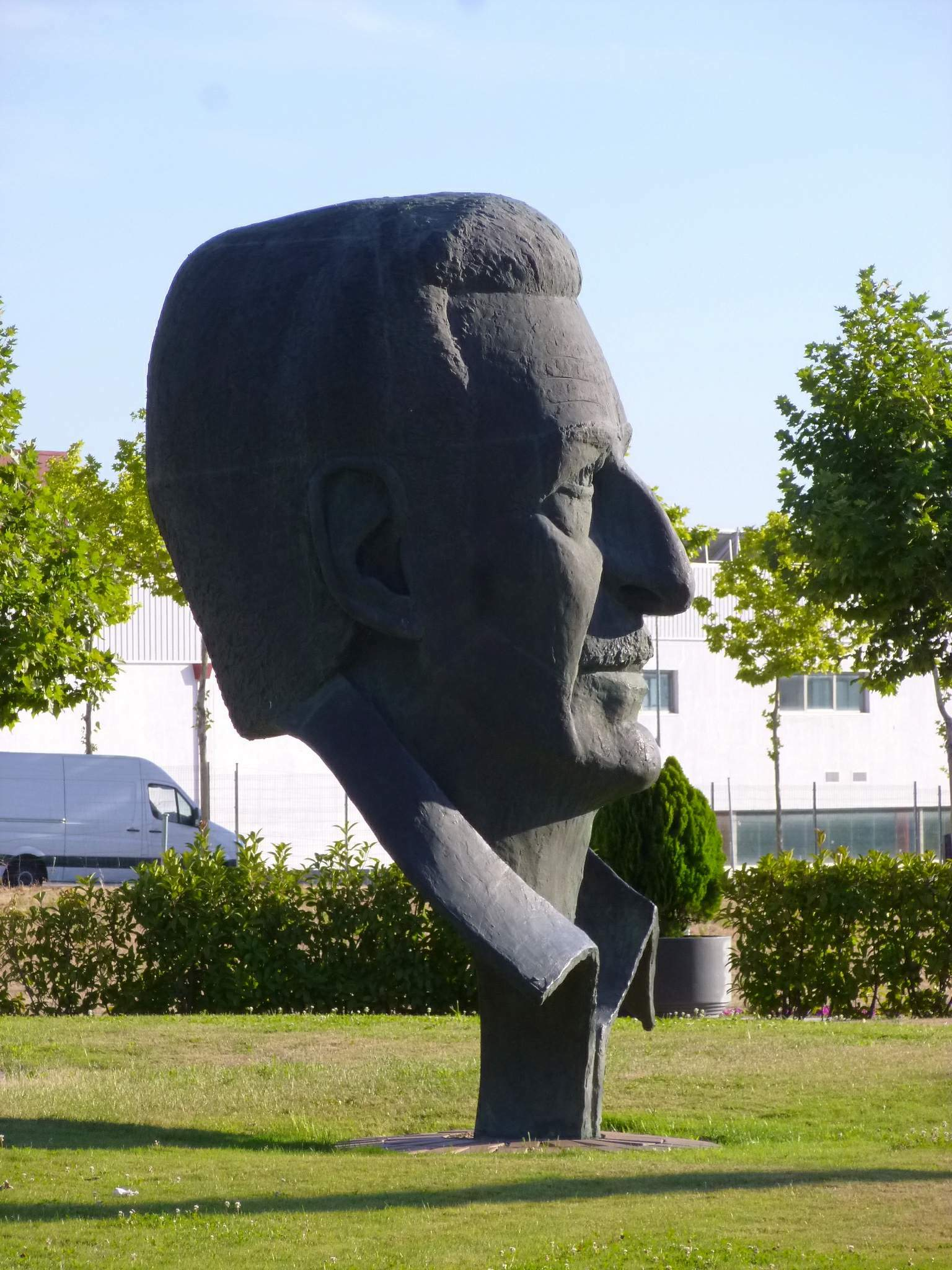
Alfredo Kraus

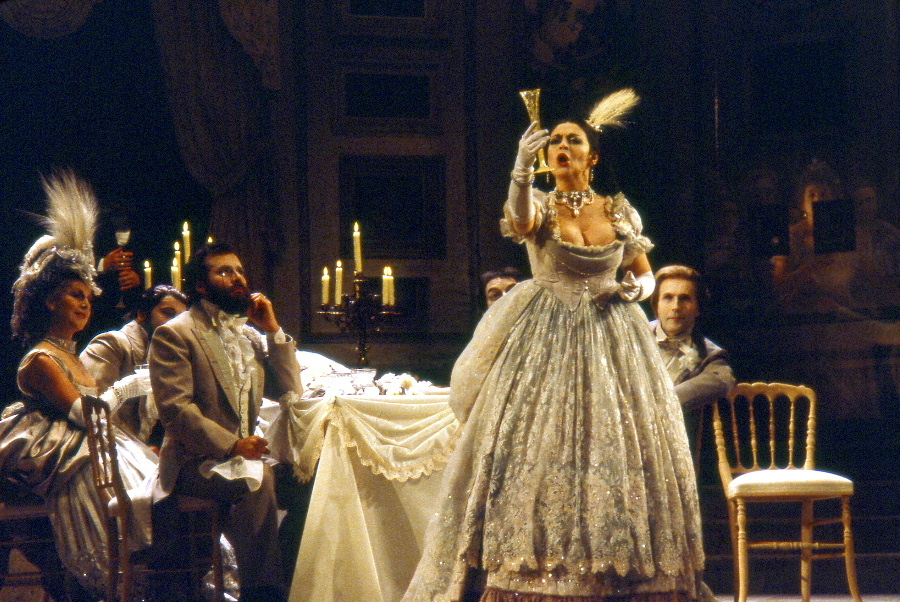
Catherine Malfitano

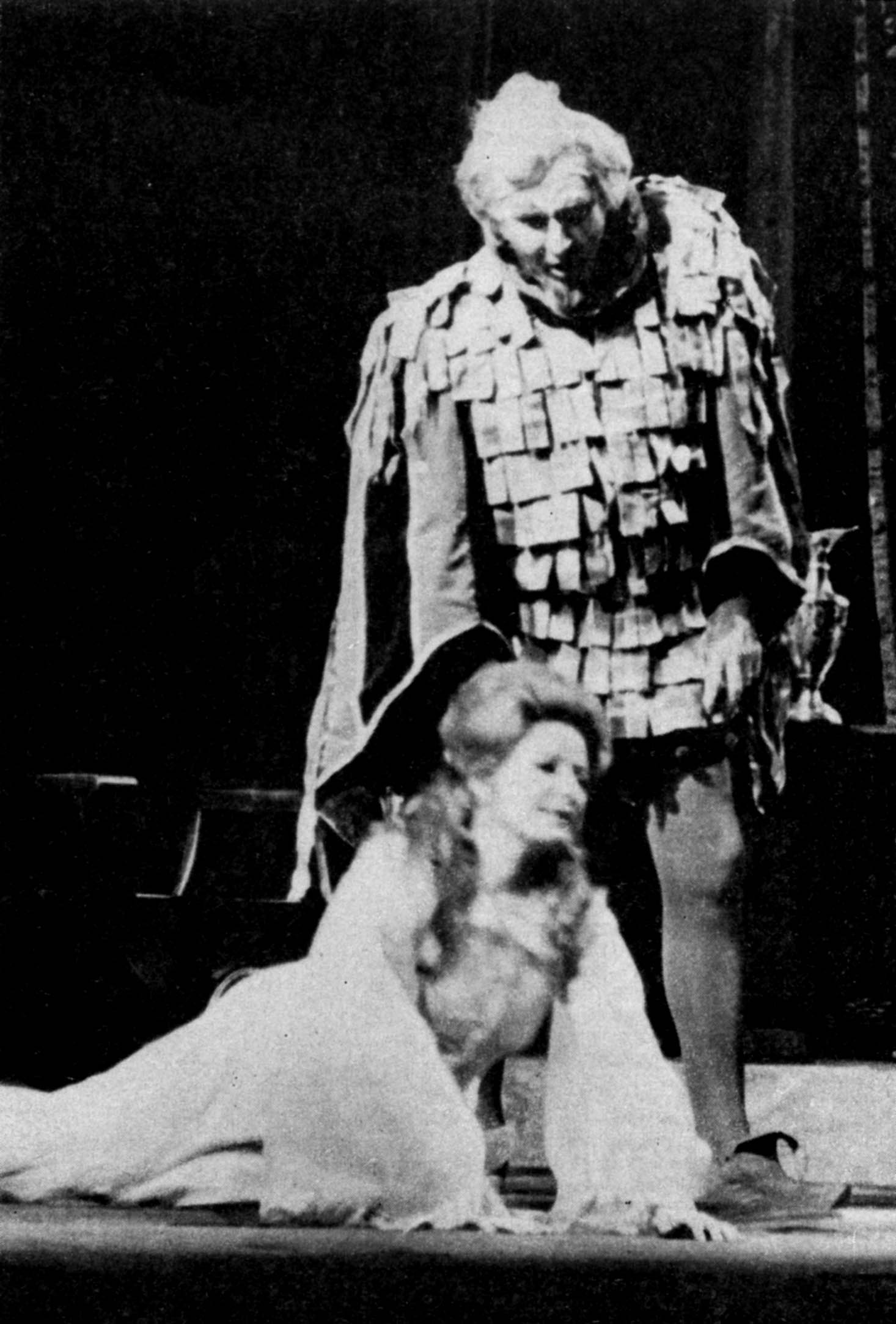
Sherrill Milnes

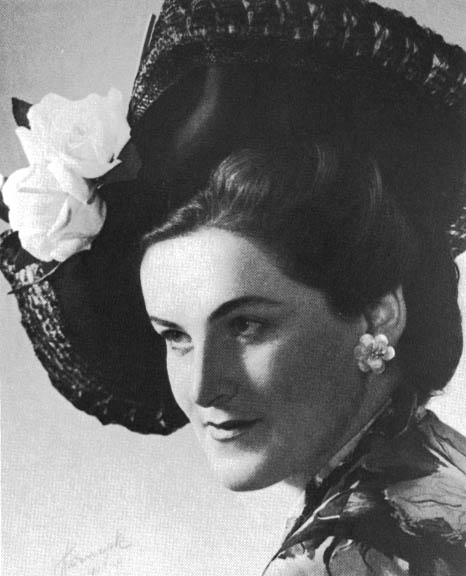
Birgit Nilsson

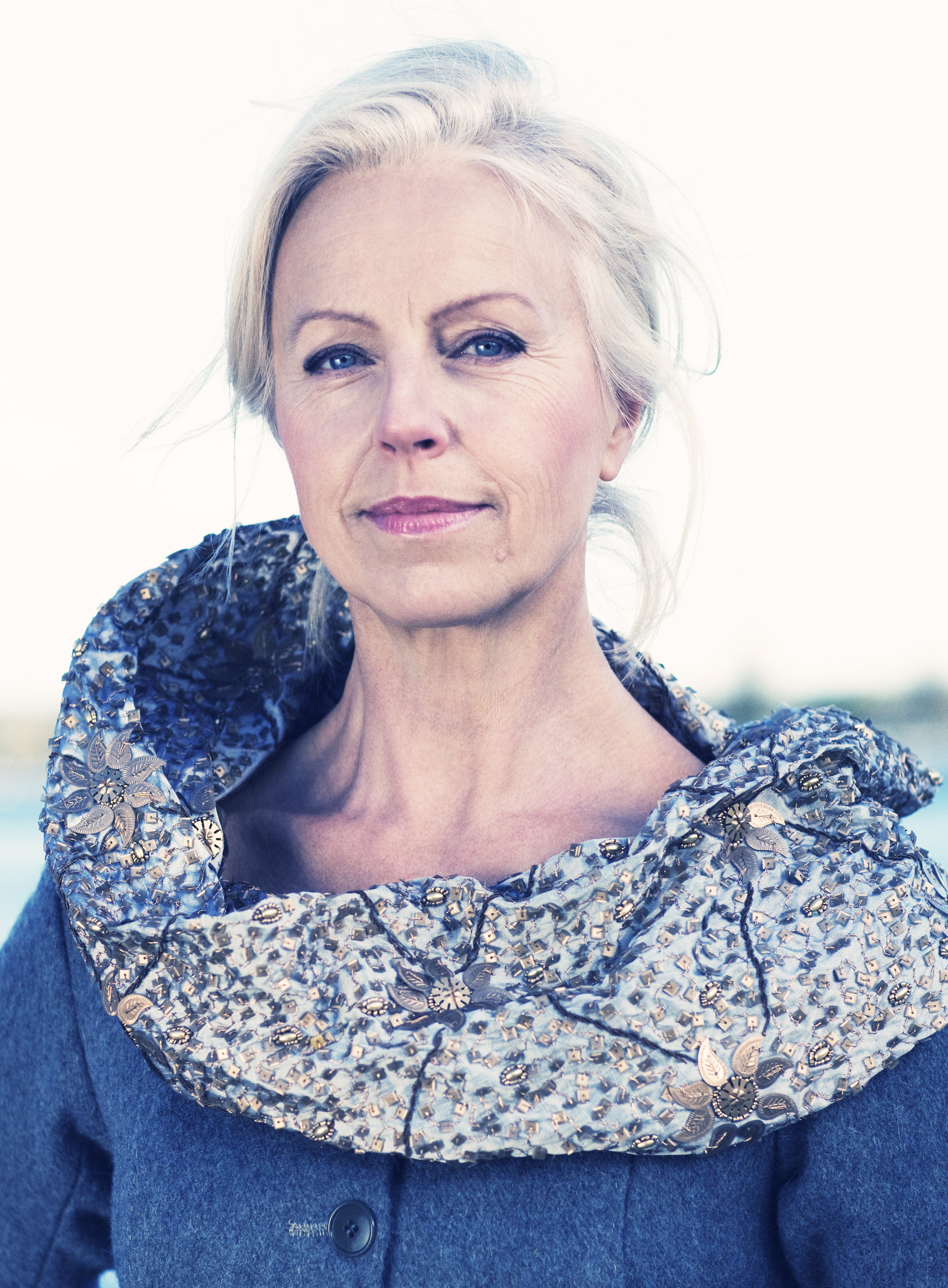
Anne Sofie von Otter

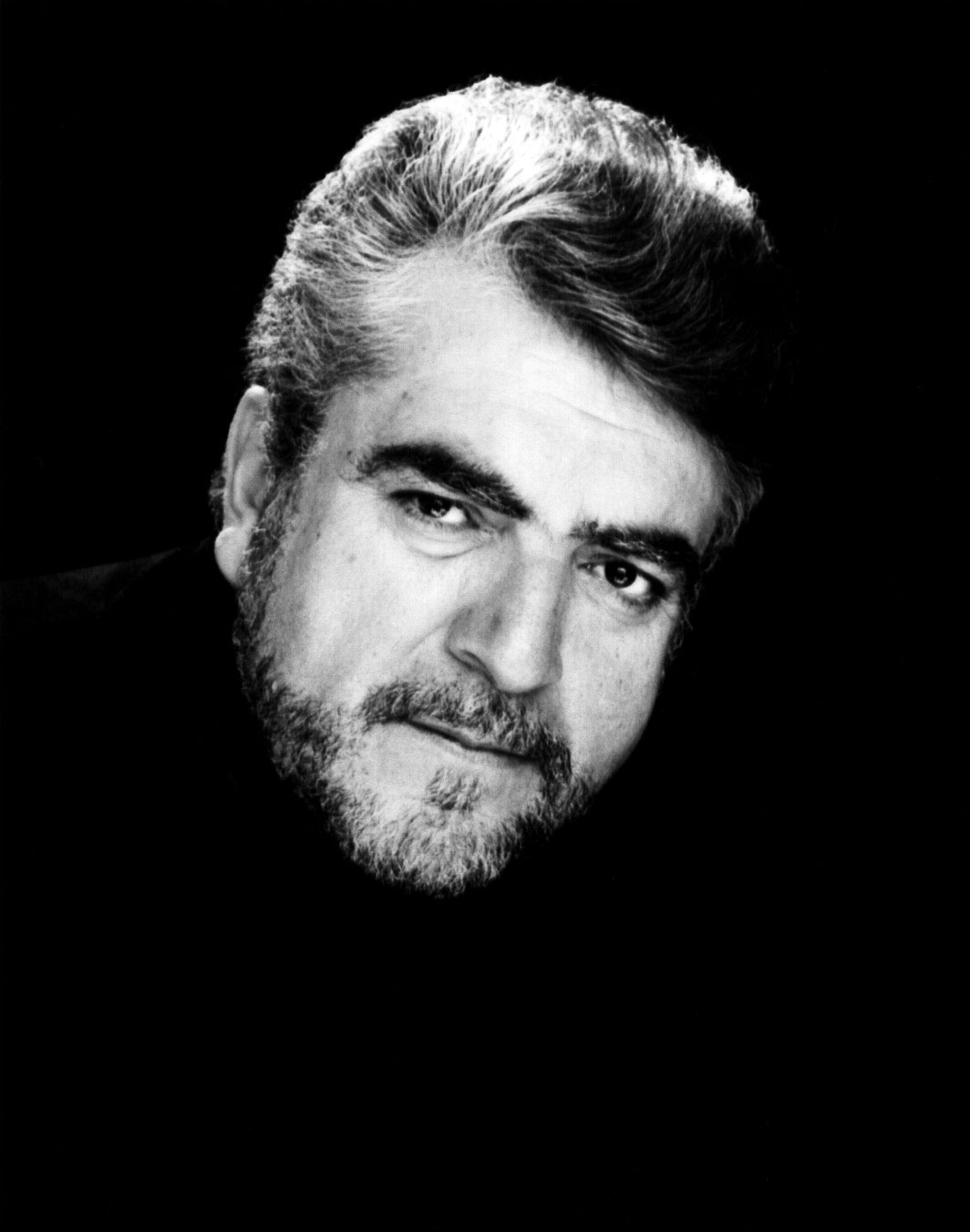
Juan Pons

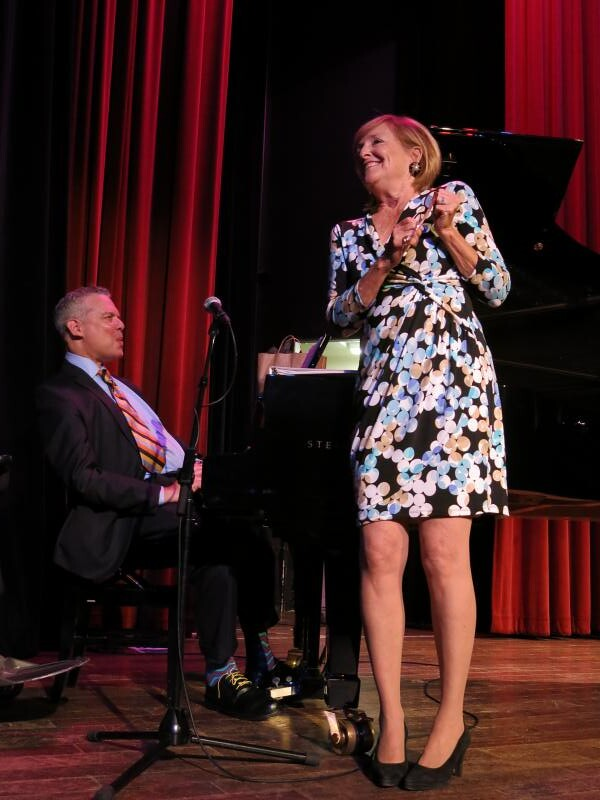
Frederica von Stade

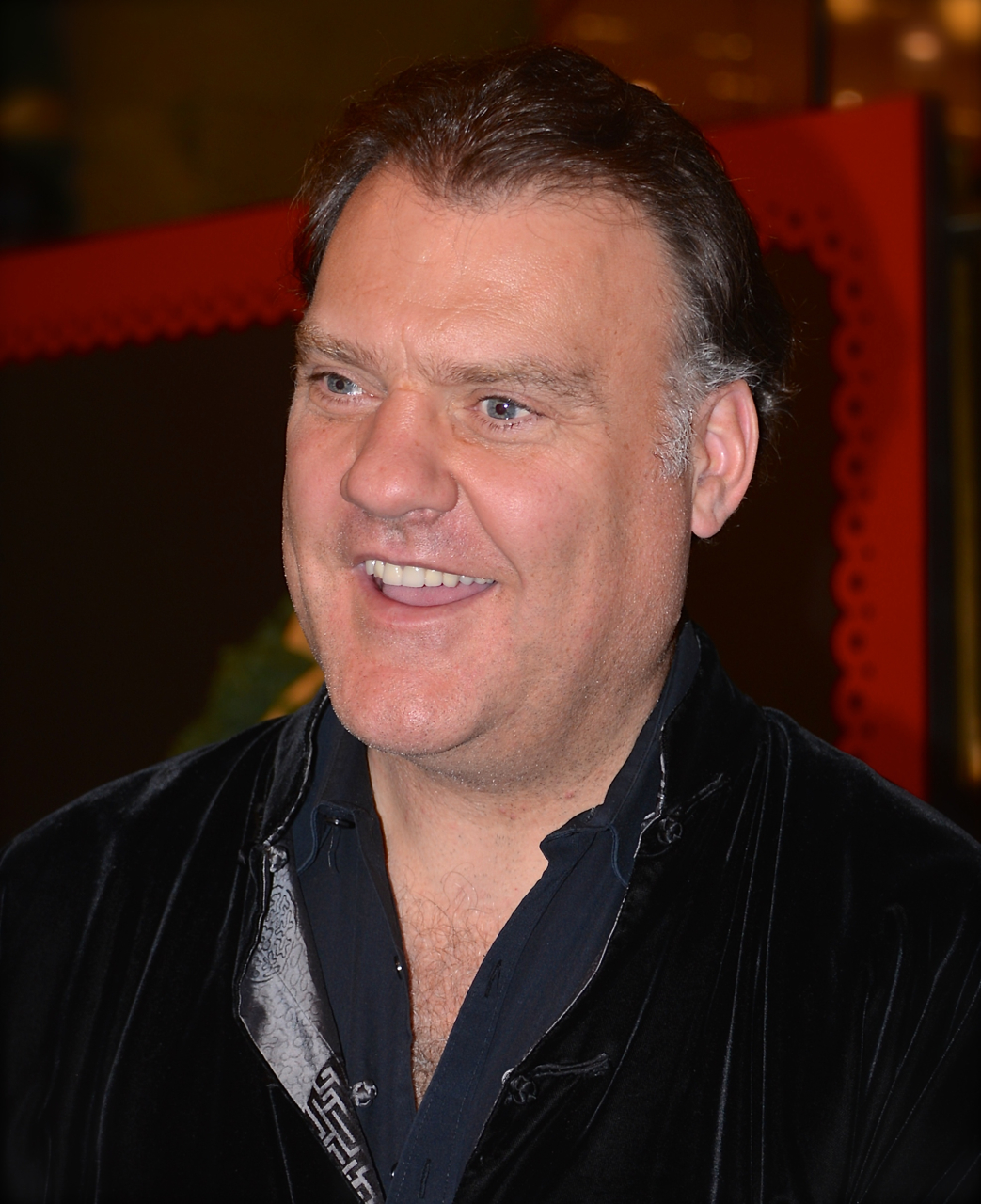
Bryn Terfel

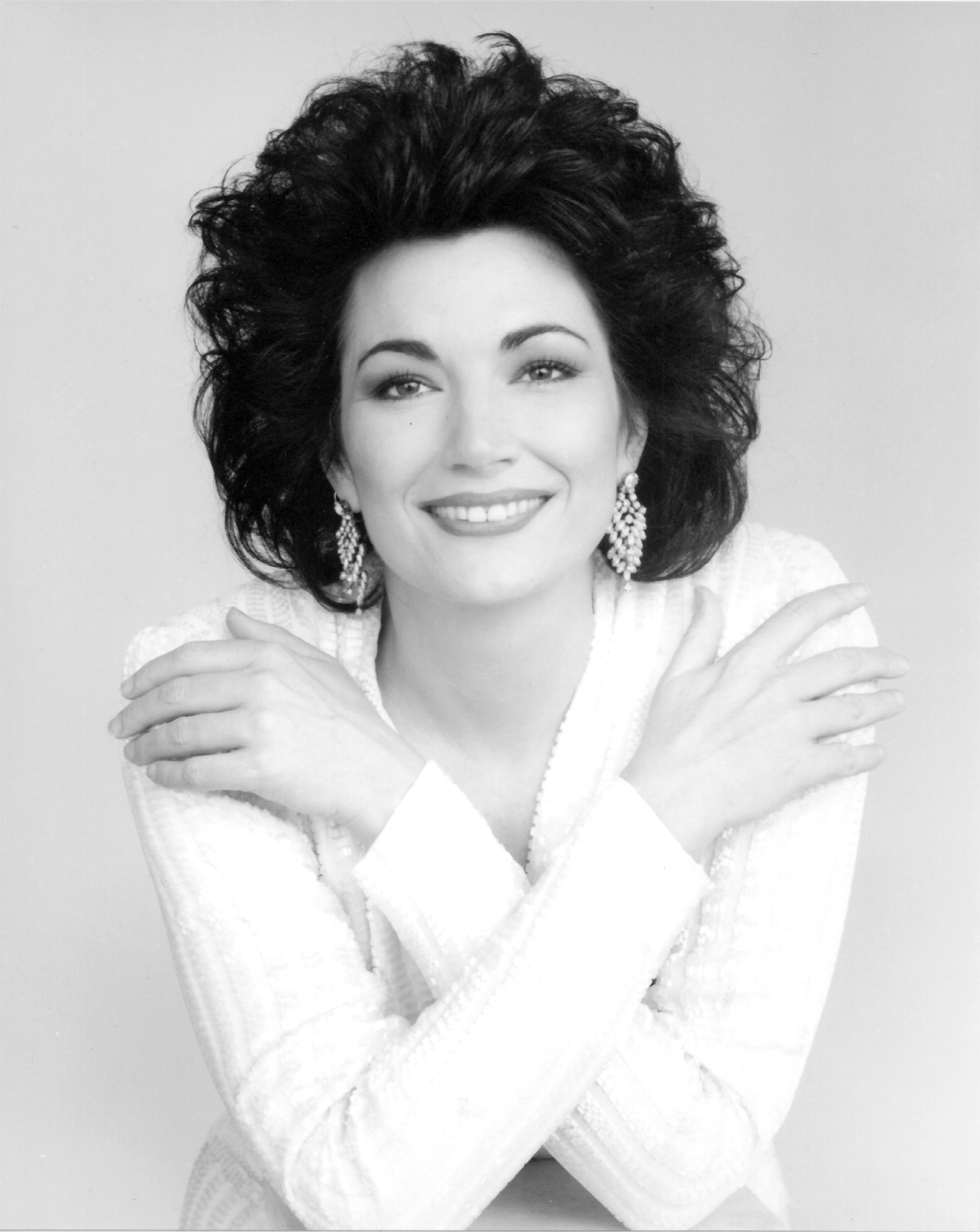
Carol Vaness

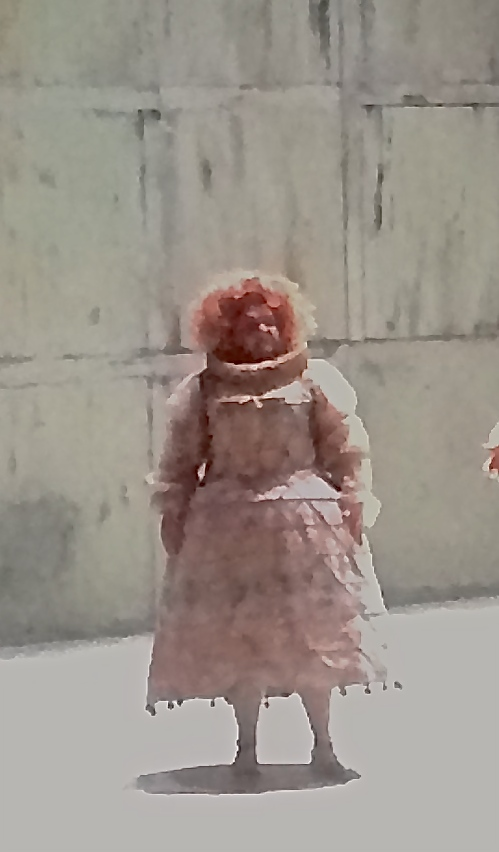
Dolora Zajick

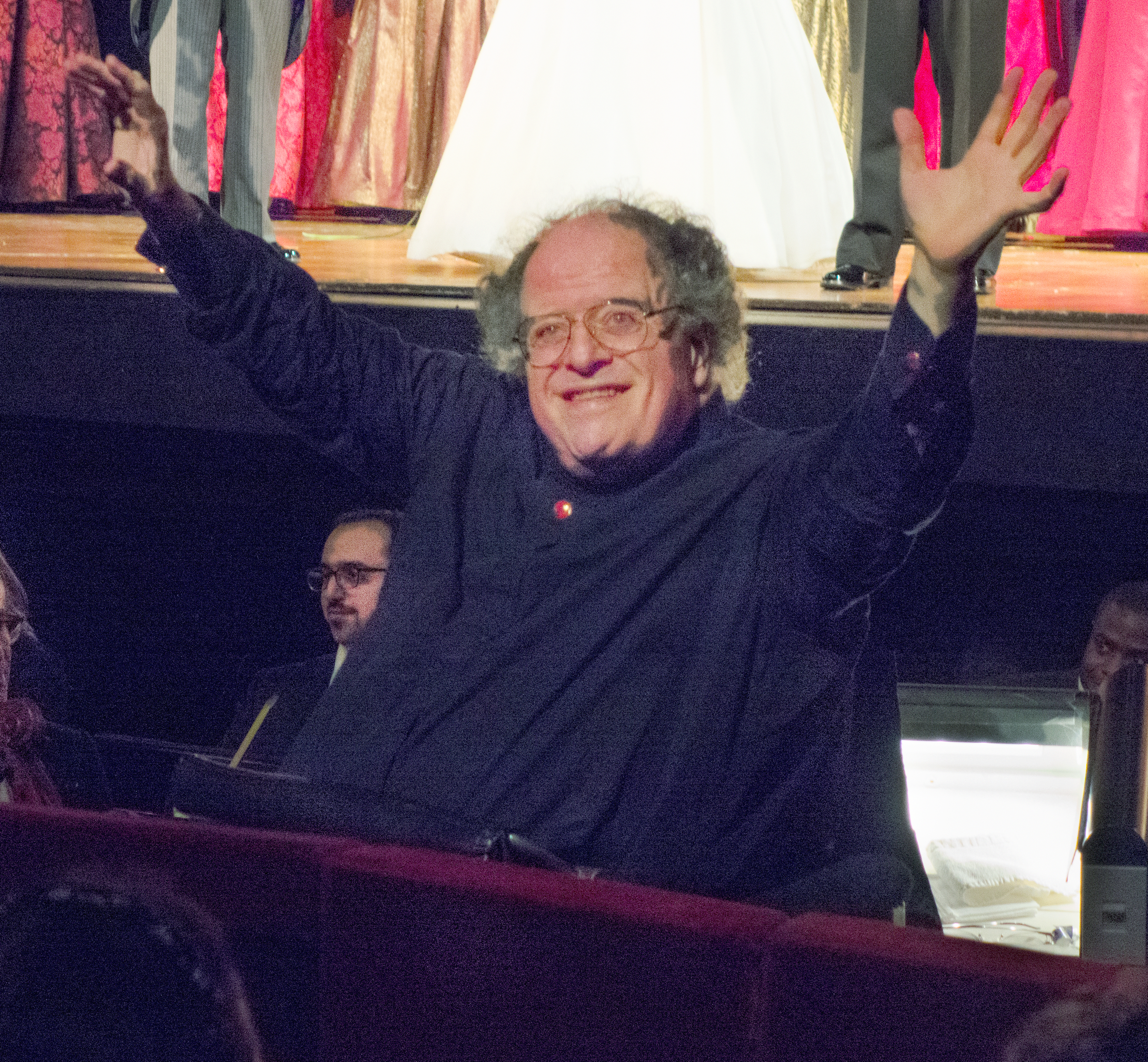
James Levine

== See also ==
- The Metropolitan Opera Centennial Gala
- The Metropolitan Opera Gala 1991
