= Sylvie Valayre =

French operatic soprano (born 1956)

Sylvie Valayre (born 10th october 1956, Paris) is a French operatic soprano known for her versatile interpretations of lyric, spinto, and dramatic coloratura soprano parts. She sings grueling roles like Abigaille, Lady Macbeth or Turandot as well as lighter pieces like Giordano's Maddalena, Cio-Cio San (Madama Butterfly), or Verdi's Desdemona at major opera houses around the world.

== Education ==
Born in Paris, she graduated at the Paris Conservatory under the guidance of Christiane Eda-Pierre and Régine Crespin. She attended master classes of Cathy Berberian, Galina Vishnevskaya, Gino Bechi, Paul von Schilawsky in Florence and Montpellier, Giuseppe Di Stefano, who later chose her to perform a concert with him at Théâtre du Châtelet. Later, she undertook advanced studies with tenor Sergio Tedesco and with mezzo-soprano Catherine Green.

== Early operatic career ==
She began her career in 1984 with a play about Maria Malibran at the Théâtre Marigny in Paris, performing excerpts from operas like Semiramide and Norma (also available as DVD). Soon after, Mstislav Rostropovich and Galina Vishnevskaya asked her to perform the title role in their production of Nikolai Rimsky-Korsakov's The Tsar's Bride at the Rome Opera.

In 1987, she sang her first Mozart opera, performing the role of Fiordiligi in Così fan tutte. Other roles during this stage of her career included Mimi in La Bohème, Tosca in Tosca, Magda in La rondine, Violetta in La traviata, Norma in Norma, Leonore in Fidelio, Manon in Manon Lescaut, Thaïs in Thaïs, Adina in L'elisir d'amore, Liù in Turandot, the Infante in Der Zwerg (or The Infante's Birthday) by Zemlinsky, La Voix humaine by Poulenc and more. In 1994, she was performing in major Italian houses in works like La Voix humaine (Trieste, Genova, Naples), Cavalleria rusticana (Trieste, Bologna), L'heure espagnole and Il segreto di Susanna (Opera of Trieste).

In 1995, in a production touring through the Netherlands, she debuted in the part of Lady Macbeth, later one of her signature parts.

== International breakthrough and career ==
In 1996, with the production of Venice's La Fenice, she made her debut in Warsaw in the part of Elisabetta in Don Carlo. A few months later followed her debuts in Nabucco at Covent Garden Opera, Madama Butterfly in Naples and Venice (La Fenice) and in Don Carlo at Royal Albert Hall in London.

In 1997, Milan invited her onto the famous stage of La Scala to perform Ponchielli's La Gioconda. Her debut in Milan was soon followed by other debuts at other famous opera houses: Madama Butterfly at San Francisco Opera, Verdi's Jerusalem at Carnegie Hall in New York, Nabucco in Zürich with Nello Santi as well as Nabucco, Aida and Tosca at the famous Arena di Verona, Macbeth in Paris and Tosca in Berlin. Aida in Munich followed and, in 2000, her first performances at the Metropolitan Opera in Madama Butterfly. Later in 2000 Manon Lescaut at Opera Pacific, Ernani at the Madrid Opera, Aida in Macerata, Tosca in Paris and Tokyo, La Gioconda at Carnegie Hall and Macbeth in Berlin.

The year 2001 brought her to the Lyric Opera of Chicago as Tosca, to Madrid with Verdi's Requiem, to Brussels (Théâtre de la Monnaie) with Antonio Pappano and Zürich with Macbeth, to Berlin in the title part of Aida and to Macerata with Norma.

In 2002 she sang her first Chrysothemis (Elektra) in Madrid under Daniel Barenboim, Madama Butterfly in Tokyo with Maestro Myung-whun Chung, Tosca at the Metropolitan Opera in New York with Daniel Oren, the title part of Salome at Kennedy Center in Washington, D.C., with Heinz Fricke and Verdi's Requiem in New York. In September and October, she returned to the Metropolitan Opera with Plácido Domingo and James Levine to give her first performances of Andrea Chénier's Maddalena.

The 2003-2004 season was characterized by some significant first performances, such as the title part of Turandot in Berlin with Kent Nagano; the part of the Empress in Strauss's Die Frau ohne Schatten, also in Berlin with Christian Thielemann; the part of Minnie in Puccini's La fanciulla del West in Zürich and the part of Amelia in Un ballo in maschera in Turin.

Other performances in 2003-04 were Tosca at the Metropolitan Opera and in Vienna, Madame Butterfly in Chicago and Naples, Macbeth in Berlin as well as Nabucco and La Gioconda in Zürich, again with Nello Santi. In August 2004 she joined Plácido Domingo for a Gala Concert La corona di pietra at the Arena di Verona (including a DVD production by Sony Classical).

The engagements of the 2004-05 season included, among others, Salome in Braunschweig and Athens with the Vienna Philharmonic Orchestra, as well as in Rome with the Orchestra dell'Accademia Nazionale di Santa Cecilia and in Tokyo; Nabucco and Fedora at the Vienna State Opera; Tosca in Zürich with Nello Santi, at the New York Metropolitan Opera with James Conlon, and in Washington, D.C.; Verdi's Aida at the Thermae of Caracalla in Rome, directed by Plácido Domingo, concluded the season.

In 2005-06, Domingo again invited her to Washington, D.C., to take part in the Gala performances Trilogy – Domingo and Guests in 3 Acts as Fedora. Salome, Macbeth and Turandot at the Berlin State Opera, Tosca and Nabucco in Zürich, Aida at the Vienna State Opera and in Munich followed. She also participated in important new productions like Macbeth as Lady at the Verdi Festival in Parma under the baton of Bruno Bartoletti (including a DVD production by the label TDK) and as Elvira in Verdi's Ernani at the Deutsche Oper Berlin, both in June 2006.

After the great successes gained with Puccini's La fanciulla del West and Giordano's Andrea Chénier at the Deutsche Oper Berlin in September and October 2006, Valayre's engagements in 2006-07 also included Nabucco at the Opera House of Zürich, Manon Lescaut at Miami's Florida Grand Opera, Macbeth at the Staatsoper Unter den Linden in Berlin and her role debut as Desdemona in Verdi's Otello at the Beethoven Festival in Warsaw. The 2006-07 season was concluded by a new production of Macbeth at Glyndebourne Festival Opera and the London Proms.

Her performances for 2007-08 included Tosca at the Opéra National de Paris, Manon Lescaut in Genova, Nabucco at Berlin's Deutsche Oper and Turandot in Tel Aviv. She also performed an extensive solo concert at the festival "Musiques au coeur" in Antibes in July 2008. In August 2008, she could be heard in Richard Strauss´ Four Last Songs and Ludwig van Beethoven's 9th Symphony at Šaľa São Paulo, in Brazil, as part of the Cultura Artística International Series.

In the 2008-09 season, Sylvie Valayre could be heard frequently throughout Germany, among others at Semperoper Dresden and Staatsoper Berlin in Macbeth and Turandot as well as at Oper Leipzig in Peter Konwitschny's new production of Giuseppe Verdi's Aida. In January 2009, she debuted at San Diego Opera as Tosca. In May and June 2009, Valayre was singing Turandot at Washington National Opera as well as in Budapest for two Gala performances.

In 2009–10, she returned to San Diego Opera for Nabucco, to Oper Leipzig for Aida, to Staatsoper Berlin for Tosca and gave her role debut as Odabella in Verdi's Attila in Marseille. In the title role of Puccini's Turandot, she gave her house debut at Monte-Carlo Opera and inaugurated the new opera house in Guangzhou (China) under the baton of Lorin Maazel in May 2010.

In the 2010–11 season, Sylvie Valayre returned to the Opéra Bastille in Paris as Giorgetta in Puccini's Il tabarro under the baton of Philippe Jordan, sang a gala performance of Madama Butterfly in Mannheim and gave her debuts at Beejing Opera as Turandot and at Royal Opera Copenhagen as Empress in Strauss' Die Frau ohne Schatten.

In November 2011, she sang her first Carmen at the Festival Ninon Vallin.

Performances in 2013 include a concert in London and her role debut as Senta in The Flying Dutchman at the Montepulciano Festival.

== Quotes ==
After her debut at the Metropolitan Opera New York in 2000 as Cio-Cio San, the New York Times described her portrayal as "lovely, vulnerable" and reported that "her singing had poignancy and beauty - standing ovation".

In 2005, the Washington Post considered her Tosca in Washington, D.C., to be "filled with sparkling, stratospheric moments", noted that "here was a pleasing artistry in her singing that merged accurate intonation with an ability to move her sound smoothly across a wide vocal range" and wrote that "the top of her soprano voice is nothing less than extraordinary".

Great Britain's The Daily Telegraph reported on Verdi's Macbeth at the London Proms 2007 that Valayre was "a real find of a Lady Macbeth" and that she would possess "the ideal voice for the role: a dramatic soprano with an incisive edge and the dark-tinged richness of a mezzo."

== Recordings ==
1984: "La Malibran"

Théâtre Marigny, Paris

DVD

1991: Raffaello de Banfield: "Una lettera d'amore di Lord Byron"

Gianfranco Masini; Orchestra Sinfonica dell'Emilia Romagna "Arturo Toscanini"

CD, Ermitage ERM 403

1991: Felice Lattuada: "Le preziose ridicole"

Gianfranco Masini; Orchestra Sinfonica dell'Emilia Romagna "Arturo Toscanini"

CD, Aura Classics

1992: Philippe Hersant: "Le Chateau des Carpathes"

David Robertson; Orchestre Philharmonique de Montpellier

CD, Accord

1995: "Easter Concert from Paris" (Jean-Louis Florentz: "Mary's prayer at Golgotha")

Jean-Jacques Kantorow; Paris Orchestral Ensemble

DVD, Goldline Classics

2004: "La corona di pietra - Gala concert Arena di Verona with Placido Domingo" (Bellini: finale of "Norma")

Orchestra Arena di Verona

DVD, Sony - BMG

2006: Giuseppe Verdi: "Macbeth"

Bruno Bartoletti; Orchestra del Teatro Regio di Parma

DVD, TDK Music

2007: Christmas Album (Sylvie Valayre sings the traditional "What Child is This?")

Camerata of London

CD, MSM-CD
