= McCandlish Phillips =

American journalist (1927–2013)

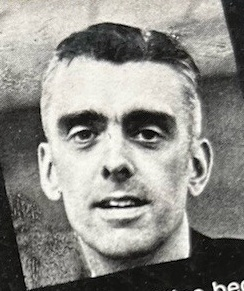
- Phillips in the 1970s
- Born: John McCandlish Phillips Jr. December 4, 1927; Glen Cove, New York, U.S.
- Died: April 9, 2013 (aged 85); Manhattan, New York, U.S.
- Education: Brookline High School
- Occupation: Journalist
- Employer: The New York Times

John McCandlish Phillips Jr. (December 4, 1927 – April 9, 2013) was an American journalist and author on religious subjects. He worked at The New York Times from 1952 to 1973. McCandlish was most well known for writing a story for the Times which revealed that senior Ku Klux Klan and former American Nazi Party official Dan Burros was ethnically Jewish, which resulted in Burros committing suicide.

Several years later Phillips stopped his work as a journalist to focus his career on evangelical Christianity. In 1962, he helped found the New Testament Missionary Fellowship in Manhattan.

== Early life ==
John McCandlish Phillips Jr. was born in Glen Cove, New York, on December 4, 1927. He had a sister. His parents separated when he was three. His father was a traveling salesman; as a result, Phillips attended at least 13 schools.

He graduated from Brookline High School in Massachusetts in 1947. In lieu of college, he became a reporter and editor for local papers in New England, before serving in the United States Army from 1950 to 1952 at Fort Holabird. Shortly before his discharge, there at Fort Holabird he attended Baptist church service and became a born-again Christian.

== Journalism career ==
After becoming a born-again Christian, he decided that he would "go anywhere in the world and do anything He wanted me to do". While initially expecting he was to become a missionary or a preacher, he came to believe that God told him it was his mission to become a reporter for The New York Times. In November 1952, he asked Richard D. Burritt for a job as a copy boy; despite not having attended college, which the Times required for their copy boys, Burritt was so impressed by his confidence that he gave him the job. He later became a clerk, and then was promoted to reporter in 1955 for the paper's Brooklyn office.

An early piece he wrote caught the attention of the others in the office, a satire piece where he wrote on life in Brooklyn like it was in a foreign country. He was promoted soon after. His reporting was known for its lyrical styling and features; Arthur Gelb later recalled him as "the most original stylist I’d ever edited". Gay Talese said Phillips was "the Ted Williams of the young reporters. He was a natural. There was only one guy I thought I was not the equal of, and that was McCandlish Phillips"; he was a favorite of A. M. Rosenthal. He was also known by other reporters for his physical demeanor; other editors compared him to Ichabod Crane and called him "the man of the awkward gait and the graceful phrase". His reporting often focused on the "forgotten people".

Phillips was seen as very talented but somewhat strange for his extreme religious devotion. He led prayer meetings for Christian New York Times writers and kept a Bible at his desk. He refused to participate in drinking or smoking, common pastimes in the offices. While not working, he preached, sometimes in churches and sometimes on the sidewalk, though he did not preach to his coworkers. He went through some issues in his personal life at the time; his father died, and he invited his mother to live with him due to her financial issues. This led to fights; on one occasion his mother called the police on him, leading to a week long psychiatric hold for examination, and his mother moving out. He dated once, but broke up with her due to a difference in religion.

=== Exposure of Dan Burros ===
Phillips was most well known for, in 1965, writing a story that revealed that senior Ku Klux Klan and former American Nazi Party official Dan Burros was ethnically Jewish. Rosenthal brought up the story to him, and Phillips was intrigued; he also believed it confirmed a "premonition" he believed he had received from God to not take a four day weekend he had been planning that week. In investigating, two younger reporters assisted him. Phillips interviewed Burros for the story. When Burros found out that the story was about his ancestry, he threatened to kill Phillips before the story was published. Phillips attempted to convert Burros to Christianity; Burros said Phillips was trying to "con" him. Phillips was given a security guard due to the threats. When the story was ultimately published, Burros shot himself to death the same day.

Phillips said he did not regret the piece and did not express any guilt, but said that the suicide saddened him; he told Gelb when he was informed of the suicide that it was "the God of Israel acting in judgment". This resulted in a large amount of media coverage, and McCandlish won the Page One Award from the Newspaper Guild of New York for the piece. Phillips declined involvement in Gelb and Rosenthal's book on Burros, One More Victim, citing scripture: "touch not the spoil". After the Burros piece, he wrote for the Times' Metropolitan column. In 1974, he wrote a collection on reporting in New York, City Notebook.

== Evangelical Christianity ==
Beginning in 1970, he wrote several books on evangelical Christian topics. He became frustrated with his job at the Times; he was fixated on a story that the others in the office ridiculed, that of Otto Griebling, a circus clown who he thought was a great artist, and was frustrated by a lack of recognition for Griebling. He was also frustrated by what he saw as the Times' indifference towards persecution of Christians. Other reporters saw his work as becoming increasingly religious. The paper also paid him little for features that took weeks. In December 1973, he resigned from the paper to focus on evangelical Christianity, preaching the gospel at Columbia University, though he worked occasionally as a freelancer for the paper. He intended to work for other outlets, but never approached any of them. Afterwards he fell out of contact with most of his former colleagues. He wrote the occasional article for Christian journals.

In 1962, he helped found the New Testament Missionary Fellowship in Manhattan with Hannah Lowe; the group believed all "pornography, drugs, abortion, and any form of fornication (including premarital sex and homosexuality) are sins", though did not advocate that the government should intervene. This group made news headlines in the 1970s when several of their congregants were kidnapped by their families after they claimed the group had brainwashed them. The group continues to exist and has otherwise incurred little controversy since. In 1996, Phillips was the primary speaker at the funeral of Nathaniel C. Nash, a fellow Times reporter and member of Phillips's congregation killed in a plane crash.

In the 1990s, he worked as general manager of a small publishing house that focused on religion that he had co-founded with Lowe, Thomas E. Lowe, Ltd.

== Death and legacy ==
Phillips died in Manhattan on April 9, 2013, from complications of pneumonia. The World Journalism Institute's John McCandlish Phillips Director of Mentoring is named in his honor.

== Bibliography ==
- The Bible, the Supernatural and the Jews (1970)
- The Spirit World (1970)
- City Notebook: A Reporter's Portrait of a Vanishing New York (1974)
- What Every Christian Should Know About the Supernatural (1987)
