= Dan Burros =

American Jewish neo-Nazi (1937–1965)

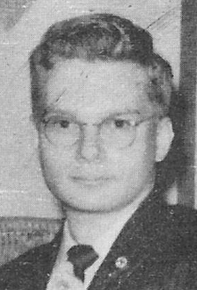
- Burros c. 1961
- Born: March 5, 1937; The Bronx, New York, U.S.
- Died: October 31, 1965 (aged 28); Reading, Pennsylvania, U.S.
- Cause of death: Suicide by gunshot
- Organizations: American Nazi Party (1960–1961); American National Party (1962); National Renaissance Party (1963–1964); Ku Klux Klan (1965)

Daniel Burros (March 5, 1937 – October 31, 1965) was an American neo-Nazi affiliated with several far-right organizations. Burros was once the third highest-ranking member of the American Nazi Party, and later a Grand Dragon of the Ku Klux Klan in New York. Within the far-right movement, Burros was known for the severity of his antisemitism. He edited several neo-Nazi periodicals and publications, including his newspaper The Free American, which became popular with fascists internationally. When The New York Times published an article revealing that he was Jewish, Burros killed himself.

Born to a Russian Jewish family in the Bronx, Burros was enrolled in Hebrew school in Richmond Hill, Queens, where his bar mitzvah was held. He became antisemitic as a teenager. After serving in the Army for several years, he was discharged under honorable conditions in 1958 and joined the American Nazi Party in 1960. Burros left the party the next year alongside his close friend John Patler. Patler and Burros founded a splinter group, the American National Party, along with their Kill! magazine, in New York. Soon after they had a falling-out, their group and magazine failed, and Patler returned to the American Nazi Party. Influenced by fascist ideologue Francis Parker Yockey's book Imperium, Burros joined James H. Madole's neo-Nazi National Renaissance Party in 1963. After a dispute with Madole, he left the group and became an Odinist.

In 1965, Burros was recruited into the Ku Klux Klan by Roy Frankhouser and quickly became the King Kleagle and the Grand Dragon of the New York chapter of the Ku Klux Klan's United Klans of America. On October 31, 1965, his Jewish heritage was exposed to the public by journalist McCandlish Phillips, who published an article about Burros in The New York Times. Some hours after the article was published, Burros fatally shot himself in Frankhouser's home. His suicide was widely publicized; The New York Times received both criticism and praise for running the story. A biography of Burros, One More Victim, was written by A. M. Rosenthal and Arthur Gelb in 1967, and his life was the basis for the 2001 film The Believer.

== Early life ==
Daniel Burros was born March 5, 1937, to George and Esther Burros (née Sunshine), both children of Russian Jewish immigrants, at Lebanon Hospital in the Bronx, New York. George Burros enlisted in the United States Navy and served during World War I, where he received a disabling wound. He could work only occasionally as a machinist and so relied largely on his pension. He did not regularly attend synagogue and, according to Esther, was not very interested in Judaism. Esther, who had immigrated from Russia aged two, worked occasionally as a saleswoman; unlike her husband, she was a devout Jew. They were married by a rabbi in the Bronx on May 31, 1936.

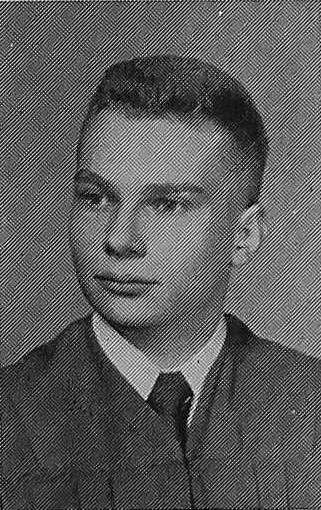
Burros's 1955 yearbook photo at John Adams High School

Burros was an only child, and shortly after his birth, his parents moved to Richmond Hill, Queens, to be closer to his paternal relatives. When his paternal grandparents died some years later, Burros and his parents withdrew from the wider family and family gatherings. His mother enrolled him in Hebrew school at the Orthodox synagogue Talmud Torah in Richmond Hill, where his bar mitzvah (the coming of age ritual in Judaism) was held. Unlike most of the other boys in his class, he continued to come to synagogue afterwards. Burros later said his family had pressured him into being religiously devoted. It did not last; when his rabbi accepted a larger congregation elsewhere in New York, Burros, hurt, cut back on attendance. He had high grades in junior high school but became rebellious and often sought out fights. Fascinated by soldiers, he aimed to get into the United States Military Academy at West Point. Some of his friends knew he was Jewish, but others assumed he was Christian. He began to claim he was actually German-American and not Jewish; in one incident in 8th grade, he bragged about how having blond hair made him look "Aryan".

Burros attended John Adams High School in Queens, where he did well academically; testing showed his IQ was in the 130s. He failed one course, Hebrew, telling the others in the class that he preferred German. A classmate recalled this class as easy and suspected Burros had failed it intentionally. Garnering a reputation as a hardline right-winger, he was reported for behavioral problems several times. A McCarthyite teacher politically influenced him. Burros became fascinated by and began to collect German war materials and paraphernalia, though in his first two years of high school this was initially not Nazi-related. By his junior year of high school, he displayed pictures of Nazi military officials in his room and argued Nazi Germany was misunderstood. In 1954, he called a Jewish friend of his a "Jew bastard", after which they never spoke again; this was, to his friends' knowledge, the first antisemitic thing he had said. Afterwards, his collection became increasingly Nazi-focused. He graduated in June 1955. Despite having good grades and having done several extra credit summer courses, he did not apply for admission to any college. He later told his friends that college was for Jews.

== Military career ==
Burros claimed that he tried to apply to West Point but was rejected due to poor eyesight; however, there is no evidence he ever tried to apply. Burros enlisted in the National Guard in his senior year of high school on August 12, 1954, joining the Company I, 165th Infantry Regiment. By May of the next year he qualified as a marksman. He was discharged from the Guard in August 1955 to join the United States Army, enlisting on August 18 for a six year term. He initially served in the 364th Infantry Regiment, then the 187th Airborne Infantry Regiment and finally the 327th Infantry Regiment, at, successively, Fort Dix, Fort Bragg, and Fort Campbell. Burros was one of the soldiers who forcibly integrated Little Rock Central High School in September 1957. At the time, he wrote in a letter describing this experience as "the first time [he] really [felt] like a soldier", but later sent letters saying he hated the incident.

His initial satisfaction with the army soon turned to disappointment. He was seen as a misfit, and did not receive the respect he desired. In what was probably an attempt to get out of the military, he ingested twenty aspirin (not a fatal dose) and shallowly cut his wrist. With it, he penned a suicide note, in which he said he wished for the revival of Nazism but considered the current situation "hopeless" and that with his death he "[goes] to my Führer Hitler, Der Grosse in the Third Reich that endures forever". The note ended "Heil Hitler". As a result, he was sent to a psychiatrist in the Army. Burros was declared emotionally immature, but not insane or legitimately suicidal. Several years later Burros claimed instead that he had undergone psychological treatment while serving for "sadistic tendencies and Nazi leanings", after he strangled an eagle. He was discharged under honorable conditions on March 14, 1958, less than an honorable discharge, which was ascribed to "reasons of unsuitability, character, and behavior disorder". Afterwards, he initially claimed that the army let him out after three years, and that he had decided to go due to personal factors. He later claimed he left the army in disgust after Little Rock.

== Political activity ==
Burros may have studied under a fake name at the Manhattan School of Printing in mid-1958. He began work July 10, 1958, for the Queens Public Library, operating office machines and printing cataloguing cards. He had a reputation as a good worker, but would talk about neo-Nazi topics to his coworkers at length. This lasted for a year and a half before he quit in January 1960 over a printing dispute; Burros refused to obey his boss's instructions for how to handle catalog cards. Soon after he found work operating a multigraph for the U.S. Navigation Company.

Burros began expressing an interest in neo-Nazi activism in December 1958 and contacted several neo-Nazi groups. He signed his letters with a red swastika and the name of the American National Socialist Party; he was the sole member of the supposed organization. He collected Nazi paraphernalia and often drew detailed art of Jews dying. By this time, the police had taken notice of his extremist views. Burros became a known figure among the letter-sending Nazi underground, and through correspondence came into contact with several German ex-military officers. He donated money to racist causes, including avowed racist John Kasper, who sent the money back as he considered Burros too pro-Nazi. He was briefly a member of the British National Party in early 1960, receiving a membership card.

=== American Nazi Party (1960–1961) ===
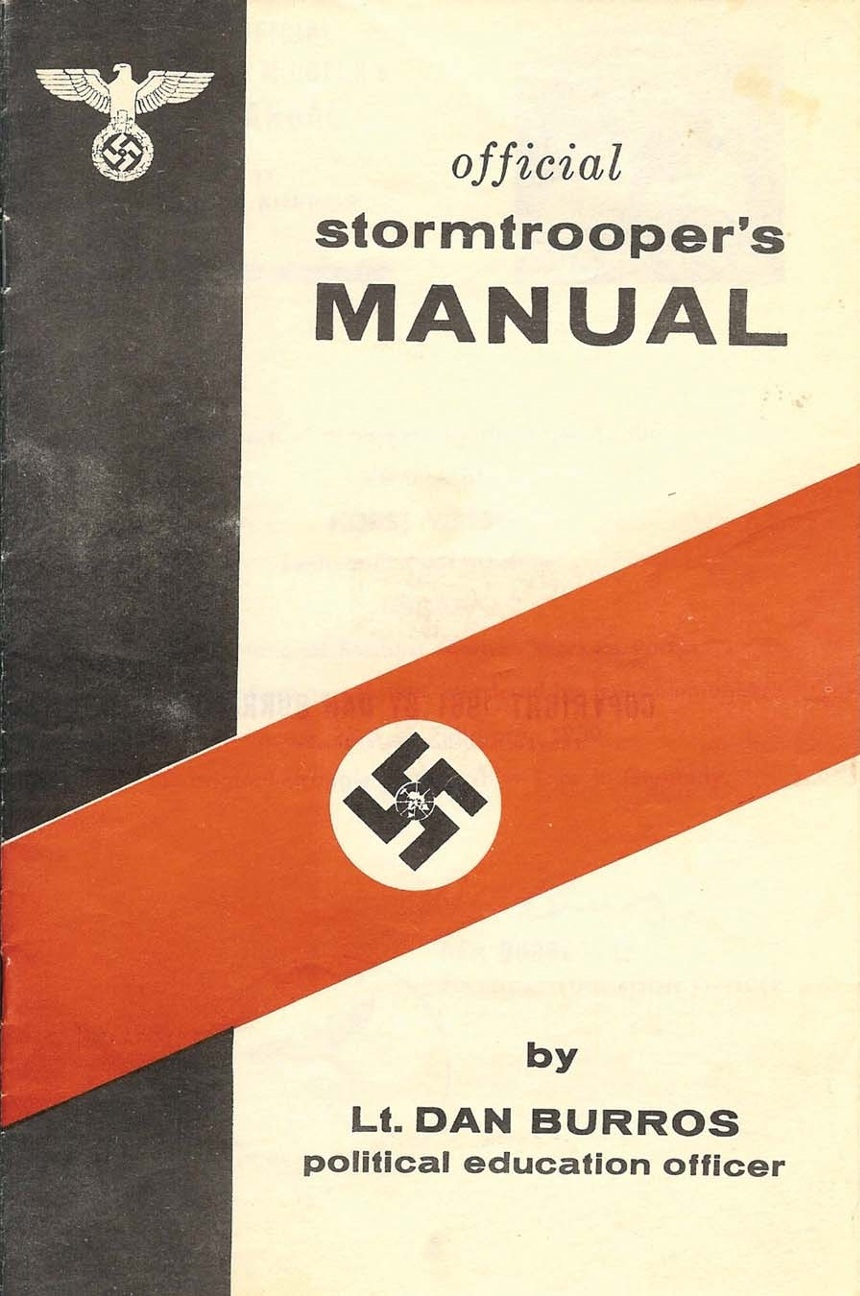
The Official Stormtrooper's Manual, written by Burros

In June 1960, Burros joined the American Nazi Party (ANP) and moved from New York City to their headquarters in Arlington County, Virginia. The party's leader, George Lincoln Rockwell, recalled that Burros had made contact with the party in 1960, first contacting James K. Warner. He was especially interested in the Nazi uniforms, and claimed on the application form that he was ethnically German. He was accepted and took the "Trooper's Oath". At the same time, he found work at the United States Chamber of Commerce operating a multilith, a kind of printing press. Burros was accepted quickly into the group, willing to donate large amounts of time and money to the party. He claimed he had learned Hebrew to better "investigate the enemy". His heritage was unknown in the ANP, but some members were suspicious of him, and he was occasionally teased for supposedly looking Jewish. Some members may have known the truth. ANP member Matt Koehl later said Burros had not looked Jewish and said Burros probably had some amount of "Aryan blood".

Rockwell appreciated Burros, impressed by his fervent Nazism and artistic and mechanical skills; he was seen by Rockwell as too fanatical, but unlike many prospective members, had valuable skills. Burros was active in the ANP's public demonstrations and picketings, being convicted several times for use of profane language and fights. Burros worked as the ANP's printer for their propaganda, including bumper stickers and antisemitic soap wrappers, largely sold through mail-order in the National Socialist Bulletin magazine. One of the items of merchandise printed by Burros was the "Jew Pass" (which was to be given to a Jew who would be last in line for the gas chamber). In one instance, a Jewish teenager from Arlington arrived at their headquarters and said he wanted to join the party. Several ANP members, including Rockwell, thought it would be a good publicity stunt to allow it, but Burros was staunchly opposed to any Jews joining the party.

Burros was known for his especially violent antisemitism, to a degree author Kevin Coogan called "almost psychotic". It sometimes embarrassed his compatriots, and at times disgusted other members of the group, particularly due to his torture fantasies. Burros carried a bar of soap labeled "Made from the finest Jewish fat", and often talked about creating torture devices to use on Jews. A specific, favorite fantasy of Burros involved the keys of a piano being modified to deliver electric shocks via wires attached to the Jewish victim of their choice, which the torturer would play to make the victim scream in different keys. He expressed contempt for Christianity as a "doctrine of weakness" and talked of a "Nordic religion". After several neo-Nazis complained the ANP members were worse fed than the party dog, Gas Chamber, Burros suggested that they eat him, which some members believed was a genuine threat.

When John Patler joined, his printing and fighting skills impressed Burros, and both men became close friends. They asked Rockwell to take control of the National Socialist Bulletin from Warner, which failed but incensed Warner. As revenge, Warner told Burros a photo of his would be removed from the Bulletin. This resulted in a fit of rage from Burros, who had to be calmed down by Rockwell telling Warner to wait for a replacement photo. In 1960, ANP security officer Roger Foss conducted background checks on all ANP members; Rockwell said that a refusal to comply with the background check meant being kicked out of the party. Burros told Foss he could give neither his background information nor home address, even if it was given confidentially. In response, party secretary James K. Warner suggested Burros be kicked out of the party. Warner and Foss went to Rockwell, who said he needed Burros as his printer, and directed them to make an exception for the background check. This led to lengthy arguments; Foss called it a security risk, and called Burros a "sadist" and a "nut" who was obviously Jewish. Rockwell nevertheless refused to remove Burros. It is unknown if Rockwell was unaware that he was Jewish, or knew that he was Jewish and did not care.

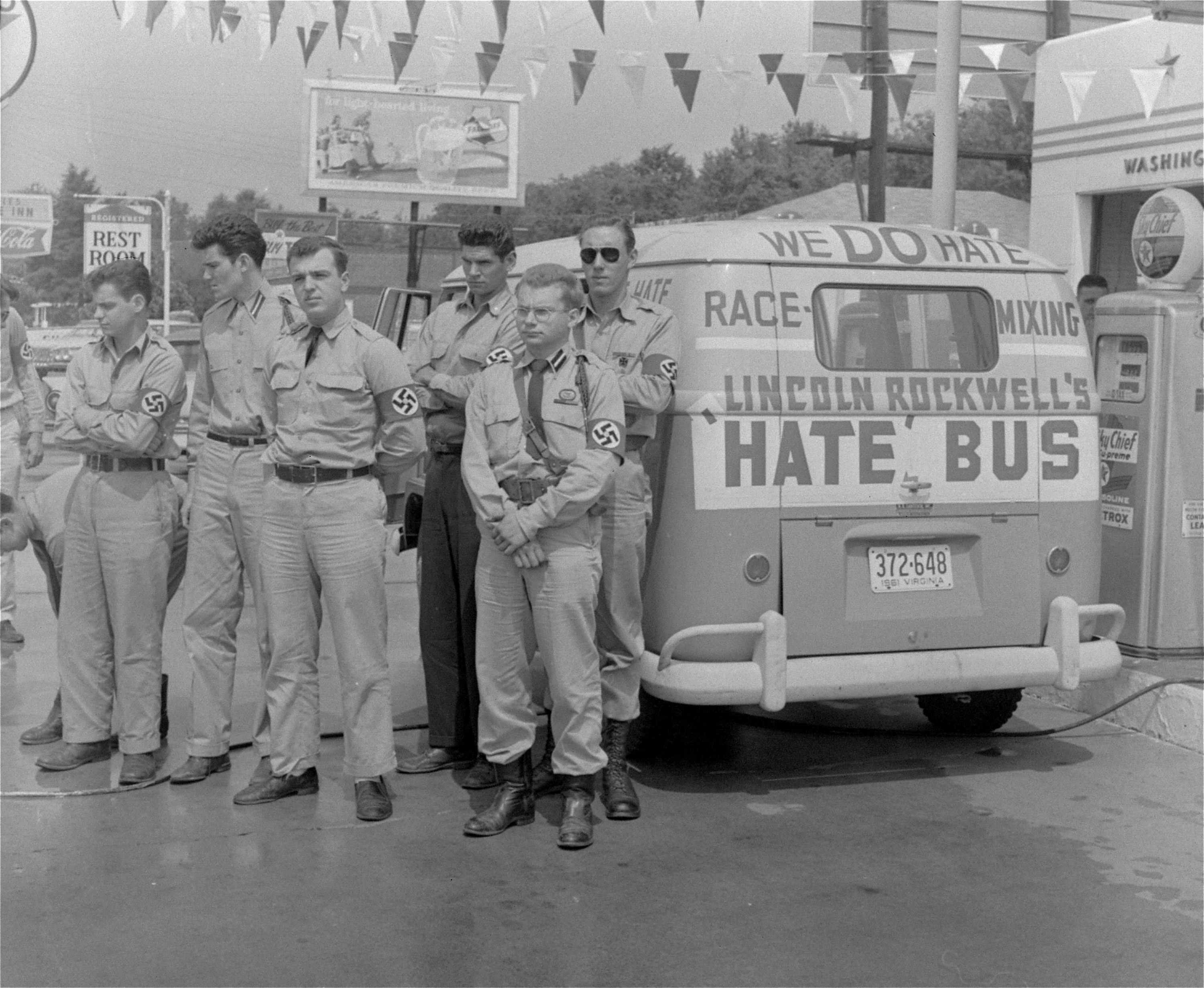
ANP members with the Hate Bus. Burros is fifth from left

On July 3, 1960, after a fight at a Rockwell speech, several ANP members, including Rockwell and Burros, and their opponents, were arrested for disorderly conduct. Due to the subsequent legal proceedings, Rockwell was involuntarily committed to a psychiatric hospital for observation for thirty days. The members worried that he would never be released. On July 26, 1960, the day before Rockwell was committed, Patler and Burros went to the Anti-Defamation League (ADL) headquarters, where they asked for copies of the ADL Bulletin, placed swastika stickers in the elevator and wrote the words "we are back". A member of the ADL called the police and a warrant was issued for their arrest for defacing the ADL's private property. The next day, Burros, Foss and Patler all picketed the White House advocating for Rockwell to be freed. After they had spent several hours picketing, Patler and Burros were arrested due to the warrant and were imprisoned. Patler's wife raised bail from a Jewish bondsman. Rockwell was released from the psychiatric hospital after only a few days. When he returned, he suspended both Patler and Burros until the outcome of their trial, but then reinstated them due to his belief in their innocence. At their trial on September 20, they were found guilty and sentenced by a jury to a $100 fine or a 10-day jail sentence and six months suspended. Both chose the fine.

The Chamber of Commerce fired Burros over his ANP membership in February 1961. In response, Burros got some of the other troopers to picket the building. In May of that year, Burros was one of the ANP members to tour in the party's Hate Bus protesting the Freedom Riders. When Jim Jones, the leader of the Peoples Temple, wrote to the American Nazi Party requesting a meeting over racial matters, it was Burros who wrote back for the party. Burros criticized Jones as an integrationist with "unnatural" beliefs and said their "natures are so divergent that we could never understand each other"; this letter was circulated in Jones's base of operations in Indianapolis. Burros was promoted to lieutenant and national secretary of the party in July 1961, making him the third highest-ranking person in the party, behind only Rockwell himself and J. V. Morgan. He authored the ANP's Official Stormtrooper's Manual. It was the ANP's official manual, distributed to all group recruits, dedicated to Horst Wessel, with design by Patler.

=== American National Party (1962) ===
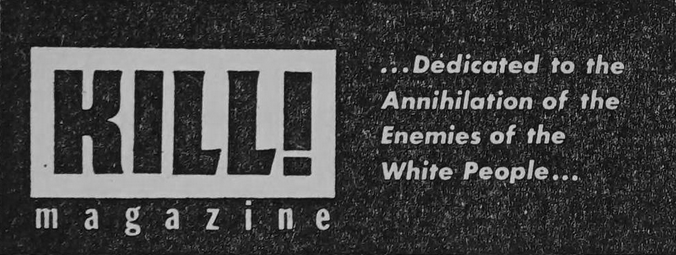
Masthead of Burros and Patler's Kill! Magazine

In late 1961, Burros and Patler began to question Rockwell's leadership. They, alongside fellow ANP member Ralph Grandinetti, were causing unity problems, due to what Rockwell biographer William H. Schmaltz described as their "continual scheming", constantly accusing other members of being spies for the Jews. As a result of their behavior, Roger Foss grew to dislike the trio. The three later got Foss demoted over a disciplinary infraction, leading to Foss leaving ANP headquarters. Burros and Patler had also edited the Official Stormtrooper's Manual in a manner Rockwell viewed as self-promotional. Burros and Patler left without notice November 5, 1961, and moved to New York.

In New York, they launched a magazine called Kill! which was "dedicated to the annihilation of the enemies of the White people". Its first issue was published in July 1962, edited by Burros. The magazine was an outlet for attacking other members of the movement and was described by Jeffrey Kaplan as "viciously racist and anti-Semitic". The first issue of Kill! displays on its back a noose and the words "Impeach the Traitor John F. Kennedy for Giving Aid and Comfort to the Enemies of the U.S.A."; the same issue also featured a Burros-written editorial entitled "The Importance of Killing". He attacked Rockwell in the magazine, saying that "without the swastika, Rockwell would be nothing" and calling him a "nigger loving liberal".

Alongside Kill!, the two men founded their own splinter group, the American National Party. Patler was the national chairman and Burros was their national vice chairman. Their party was functionally a duplicate of the American Nazi Party, and never had more than a few members. They were so poor that they could not afford Nazi uniforms, disappointing Burros, and although they picketed leftist meetings and movie theaters, they received little attention. At the time, Burros worked at a Jewish-owned printing company and did not discuss his views while at work. He spent his time collecting Nazi memorabilia. Burros informed on members of other extremist groups in New York to the police; his information was rarely helpful. Despite the risk of it outing him as Jewish, he often visited his parents in the neighborhood where he was recognized as Jewish.

The American National Party dissolved about a year later and the magazine ended after four issues, when Patler and Burros had a falling-out. When Patler was arrested and jailed for picketing a rally, he started a hunger strike in jail. He then became irate when Burros did not provide sufficient support. He was also annoyed when Burros decided to watch football instead of picketing Eleanor Roosevelt's funeral with him. Burros ultimately stayed in New York and Patler returned to the American Nazi Party. Patler murdered Rockwell in 1967.

=== National Renaissance Party (1963–1964) ===
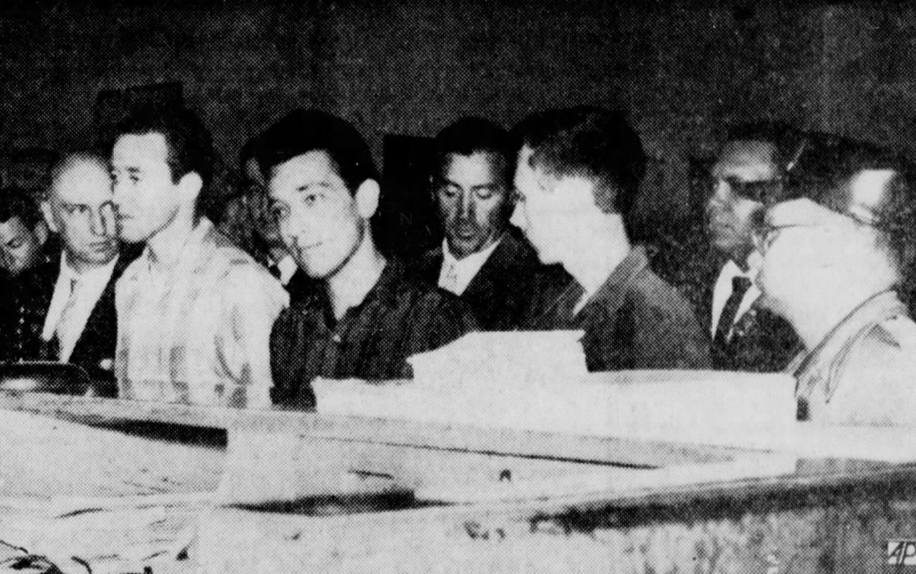
Their July 1963 booking. Madole is to the far-left, Burros is to the far-right

Now without a group, Burros spent his time giving speeches on street corners and reading literature. He was especially interested in Francis Parker Yockey's book Imperium which he read repeatedly and called "the Bible of the American right-wing". Imperium is virulently antisemitic, but advocates a non-biological view of Jewishness; Yockey argues that some ethnic Jews are of "Western race" by virtue of having acquired "Western feelings", while some "Western" men become Jewish by absorbing Jewish philosophy.

Burros joined the neo-Nazi National Renaissance Party in early 1963. The leader of the party, James H. Madole, was also interested in Yockey; while Madole hated Rockwell, he had many of the same views. Impressed by Burros's ideological fervor, Madole promoted him to the party's high-ranking Security Echelon. However, Madole did not trust Burros, worrying he was a spy for Rockwell. Burros wrote for the group's National Renaissance Bulletin, and also edited the Security Echelon's magazine, the SE Guard.

The NRP members saw themselves as more sophisticated racists than the American Nazi Party, and at times found Burros's extreme views embarrassing, but nevertheless found him useful. He was also the editor of a newsletter, The International Nazi Fascist, sometimes just the Nazi Fascist. The International Nazi Fascist was later replaced by The Free American, a newspaper based out of New York City. The Free American became popular with fascists internationally. The paper discussed Nazi and fascist topics, advertised other neo-Nazi movements, and dated its issues by years since Adolf Hitler's birth, YF, for "Year Führer".

During the investigation into the 1963 assassination of John F. Kennedy, it was found that Lee Harvey Oswald had Burros and Rockwell in his address book, which was printed in exhibit Volume XVI of the Warren Commission. They are the only far-right figures listed. Burros being listed is likely due to a communist publication incorrectly linking Burros's American National Party to Rockwell's, misinterpreting the news of its foundation as Rockwell relocating to Queens, leading Oswald to think Burros's group was Rockwell's. Following the assassination, Burros wore a button emblazoned "Lee Harvey Oswald Fan Club".

In July 1963, Burros and other NRP members were jailed after getting into a fight with Congress of Racial Equality (CORE) protestors at a diner. They were not arrested for the fight, but after they went to file a complaint against the CORE members, a police detective found a stash of weapons and racist literature in their car. Both Madole and Burros were arrested and indicted for conspiracy and several other crimes. All were released on bail, and the case took ten months to come to trial, during which time Burros continued to correspond with other racists, attend NRP meetings, and work as a printer. He spent most of his spare time writing antisemitic literature, and acquired some amount of notoriety with racists worldwide. His name was filed in the records of police in Germany and the United Kingdom, and he received letters from other neo-Nazis expressing their admiration. Several of his writings were distributed in German neo-Nazi meetings. Come the trial May 4, 1964, Burros was sentenced to one to two years at Sing Sing State Prison. The judge blamed Madole and Burros, the most "sophisticated" members of the party, for leading the rest astray. One of the other members of the NRP was outed as Jewish during the trial. All of the men were released in less than two weeks after an appeal and Burros was bailed out by his uncle.

Burros grew to dislike Madole and debated rejoining Rockwell's party, but never did. He perceived the NRP as being only talk. Madole and Burros ultimately had a falling-out. One telling says this resulted from Burros's wish to nuke communist China, contrary to Madole's growing appreciation of China and leftist figures. Madole claimed Burros left the party because he still liked Rockwell. Burros also found Madole's dislike of swastikas annoying. Burros left the NRP and became an Odinist, but was not very committed to the faith. He was a member of an Odinist group, which considered him one of their Skalds. Other neo-Nazis nicknamed him "Dan the Fink", and he acquired a reputation as a "floater", or someone who jumps from far-right group to far-right group.

=== Ku Klux Klan (1965) ===
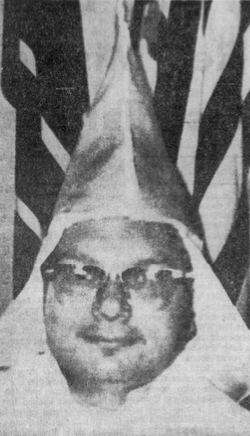
Burros in Klan robes

After leaving the NRP, Burros became frustrated, feeling that the racist movement was not reaching people or achieving its goals. He attributed this to a lack of leadership; he desired a group with many people and a leader. In 1965, at the Museum of Modern Art, Burros watched the 1915 film The Birth of a Nation, a propaganda film for the Ku Klux Klan; Burros became preoccupied with the film and the Klan, seeing it as similar to Nazism and the actual organization he desired. Initially Burros saw the Klan as a dead movement, which saddened him, but former American Nazi Party member and Klan organizer Roy Frankhouser, with whom he had reconnected after leaving the ANP, recruited him into the United Klans of America.

Frankhouser invited Burros to a Klan meeting in Bear, Delaware, on July 28. Burros was shocked by the number of attendees, which numbered in the thousands. He told Frankhouser that this was what they needed, but that he was saddened he could not join them because he was not Christian, as the Klan required. Frankhouser asked him if he "liked Christ and everything" and Burros agreed, which Frankhouser said was sufficient. Grand Wizard Robert Shelton had previously refused to admit members of the ANP, but since Burros was an ex-member and had Frankhouser to vouch for him, he was allowed to join. The Northern realms of the Klan (state level chapters) had fewer members, and especially devoted initiates into these chapters were promoted quickly. Burros became the Grand Dragon (state level leader) of the New York-area Ku Klux Klan almost immediately after he joined, since the Klan needed "intellectual" types and Burros was one of only a few KKK members in the North who were seriously devoted. He also became the King Kleagle (a KKK term for head organizer) of New York. At this time he worked as a printer for the University Club of New York.

Burros was very enthusiastic about the KKK. He agreed to stop using the swastika so as to not tie the KKK to the Nazis. Burros led two klaverns (local groups), one in Upper Manhattan and one in Lower Manhattan. They hated each other, and Burros tried to improve relations between the two. Burros and Frankhouser became close friends, and Burros continued to hide his Jewish background from him. On occasion Burros would make statements that made Frankhouser wonder if Burros was Jewish, but Frankhouser never seriously considered it due to how extreme Burros's antisemitism was. That year, he met and fell in love with a woman named Carol, also involved in white supremacy, whom he met at a Von Steuben Day parade. He claimed to her that he was German, and after they met she decided to join the Klan.

His new position brought him to the attention of authorities; his parents were visited by a federal agent, who then realized Burros was Jewish. After failing to hide that they were Jewish to the agent, his mother begged the agent to not include the information in the report. His parents knew of his involvement in racist politics, but said nothing. Partially out of sympathy for his parents, and partially due to the information on racist movements Burros provided them, the agent did not reveal this fact. More government agencies likely knew that Burros was Jewish, but for a time none revealed it.

== Reveal of Jewish heritage and suicide ==
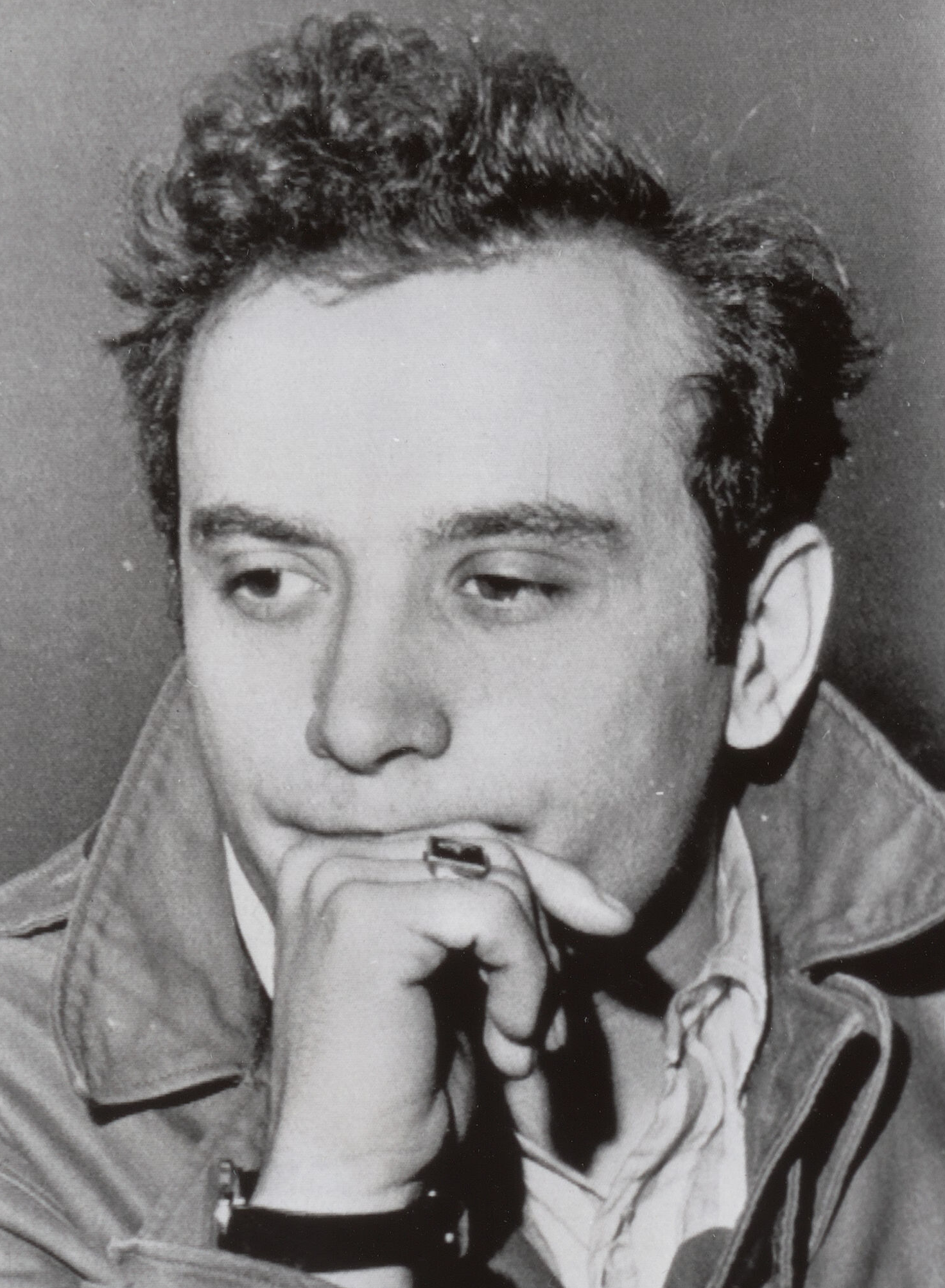
Roy Frankhouser in 1965, after he was questioned about Burros's death

On October 19, 1965, Burros was listed among prominent Klansmen in an article in the New York Journal-American. Burros correctly feared he would lose his job; he was fired the next day. Also on October 19, the House Un-American Activities Committee announced they were launching an investigation into the Klan. On October 22, several Klansmen, including Burros, went to Frankhouser's home in Reading, Pennsylvania, to hide out. Soon after the publication of the first story, The New York Times published an article including more information on Burros and his history. This was read by one of the government agents who knew that Burros was Jewish, but did not know he had joined the KKK. On October 22, this agent tipped off New York Times reporter A. M. Rosenthal that Burros was Jewish and had undergone a bar mitzvah. Initially in disbelief, Rosenthal enlisted fellow reporter McCandlish Phillips, a fundamentalist Christian, to investigate. On October 26, the House Committee served a subpoena on Burros, to be delivered by Marshall Raymond Sullivan; he went to Burros's house to serve it, but was unable to deliver it.

After discovering evidence of his bar mitzvah and Jewish schooling, Phillips tried and failed to contact Burros. Burros went back to New York on October 27 to pick up his new Klan robes and to visit Carol. On October 29, Phillips saw Burros outside his apartment and followed him into a barbershop. Burros agreed to an informal conversation rather than a formal interview. Phillips went through the details of his military and political career, impressing Burros, before revealing he knew that Burros was Jewish. Burros said that revealing this publicly would ruin his life and threatened to kill Phillips if he published the information. After the interview, Burros called the paper three times throughout the day threatening Phillips and begging him to not print the story. At one point he offered to trade the story of his ancestry for another, which Phillips rejected. In his last call, Burros said he accepted he could not prevent the story from being published, but that he would "go out in a blaze of glory", implying that he was going to shoot up The New York Times' headquarters. In response the police were called and Phillips was given a bodyguard.

Late in the day on October 29, Burros returned to Frankhouser's home. Burros said that he admired Phillips's research, but that the journalist had "found out something that I just can't live with"; he claimed that this was his Odinist beliefs, which would hurt the Christian-only Klan. Once there he paced throughout the house and threatened to blow up the House Committee and the Times, repeatedly saying he had to kill Phillips and himself. This terrified Frankhouser, who with other Klansmen present tried to calm him and locked up a gun he was carrying. Frankhouser told Burros that he would not care if he was Jewish; Burros had no response.

The Times held the story until more proof was provided. On October 31, they obtained records of his bar mitzvah. The article, entitled "State Klan Leader Hides Secret of Jewish Origin", ran on the front page that day. After reading the article, Burros said he would kill himself, and was confronted by the other members of the house. He destroyed several pieces of furniture while trying to locate a gun, before finding his own, which had been left on a dresser. Burros said "Long live the white race. I've got nothing more to live for", before he shot himself in the chest. Still standing, he shot himself again in the head. He was 28. Burros was cremated at the request of his parents, and his ashes were buried in Reading. After Burros's death, Frankhouser apologized to Burros's parents.

There were at least three eyewitnesses to the suicide, all of whom gave near identical testimonies, and the forensic evidence (e.g. Burros was the only person with powder marks on his hand) supported this, leading to suicide being the coroner's determination. Despite this, there are several conspiracy theories that Frankhouser was more involved in Burros's death than was confirmed. Burros dying from multiple gunshot wounds led to an initial suspicion from the FBI and others that Frankhouser had finished him off or that Burros had not killed himself. Burros is one of many right-wing figures mentioned in the Deguello Report, a pseudonymously-written, conspiratorial document distributed among some members of the far-right movement in the 1970s. The Report alleges various things about Burros, including that his last name was "Sonnstein", that Burros and Frankhouser were having a gay affair and Frankhouser murdered him, that James K. Warner had known he was a Jew the entire time, and that Warner and Burros "spent their time discussing hideous ways to torture and kill Christians". Thirty years after his death, the bloodstains and bullet holes were still visible in the house, Frankhouser having never removed them.

== Legacy ==
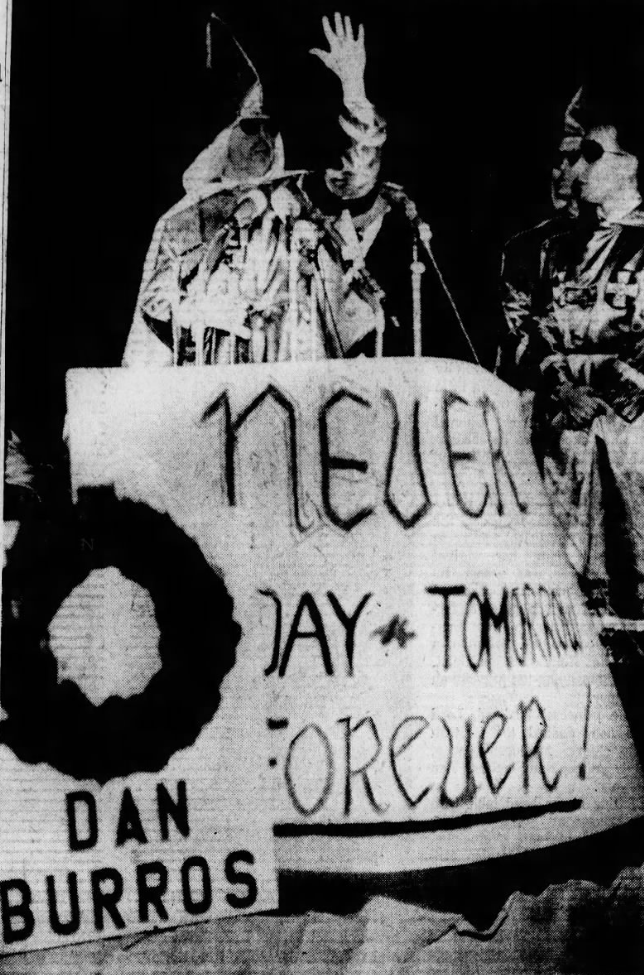
A klan leader in New York eulogizing Burros on November 6, 1965

Burros's suicide was a national news story for several weeks. The New York Times was criticized in the aftermath of the story by readers, its own staff, several Jewish groups, and neo-Nazis. Some of the Times' readers felt Burros had been mentally ill, or that the paper had invaded his privacy. Some Times staff believed the paper had gone too far with the story and that it was overly dramatic journalism, since Burros was not a major political figure. Others praised the paper for focusing on someone who could be a societal danger and argued Burros had given up his right to privacy when he became a political figure. Rosenthal was disturbed by both the criticism of the story and the suicide of Burros, but came to believe that something else would have triggered Burros eventually. Phillips was also upset over Burros's suicide, but did not regret writing the story. The increase in suicides after Burros's suicide has been studied as an example of the Werther effect, or the copycat suicide phenomenon.

Privately, Rockwell was saddened by Burros's death; he described him as a "righteous Jew" and "brilliant young man", and believed that had he lived he could have continued to work for them in some capacity anyway. He did wonder how Burros could have failed to predict that people would find out about his ethnic background. Rockwell eulogized Burros in his periodicals The Rockwell Report and The Stormtrooper. He praised Burros's dedication, saying that Burros had been "steeped in racist revolutionary causes" and through suicide had "ended his miserably sad life of lies". Rockwell took the opportunity to rail against Jews, whom he referred to as "a unique people with a distinct mass of mental disorders" and ascribed Burros's instability and suicide to the "unfortunate Jewish psychosis" which "cost him his life". In this eulogy, Rockwell wrote:

Burros hated himself and his Jewishness, and went a step further, planning to murder them all.
It killed him.

The reveal of Burros's background was bad publicity for Madole, as a former member of his party, and the NRP had issues for several years following his death. In response to Burros's suicide, Madole wrote an article for the National Renaissance Bulletin entitled "The Historical and Metaphysical Roots of the Conflict between Jew and Gentile", where he defended Burros as a genuine Nazi despite his ethnicity, and praised him for a willingness to "blast himself into oblivion as final proof of his loyalty." Following the suicide, another member of the NRP and Burros associate, Robert Burros (no relation), who had picked up editing The Free American, admitted to the party he was half Jewish through his father. Initially he was criticized, but he was allowed to stay, though was demoted, because he had "abandoned all mental and spiritual ties with the Jewish Community at the age of thirteen". The Klan eulogized Dan Burros as a "good Jew" for abandoning his Jewishness, and Klansmen burned a cross in his honor in Rising Sun, Maryland a week after his death. Frankhouser refused to disavow him.

Following Burros's death, Rosenthal and Arthur Gelb wrote the biography One More Victim in 1967, which follows his life from his family origins to his becoming a neo-Nazi. Burros's life and suicide inspired the 2001 film The Believer, which follows a Jewish neo-Nazi skinhead named Daniel. American publisher and neo-Nazi sympathizer Adam Parfrey had an interest in Burros; he republished Burros's Kill! magazine editorial "The Importance of Killing" in his 1987 anthology Apocalypse Culture. Parfrey, himself of Jewish descent, blamed Jews for Burros becoming a neo-Nazi. Political writer George Thayer, reflecting on the case, said that "his entire life was a chronicle of personal instability." Academic Jeffrey Kaplan described Burros as perhaps "one of the most tragic yet instructive cautionary tales to arise out of American National Socialism".
