= Chawadee Nualkhair =

Thai-American food writer and journalist

Chawadee Nualkhair (Thai: เชาวดี นวลแข; RTGS: Chaowadi Nuankhae) is a Thai-American food writer and journalist specializing in Thailand's street food culture, based in Bangkok, Thailand.

== Background ==
Born to Thai parents and raised in Pittsburgh, Nualkhair attended Bryn Mawr College, and moved to Bangkok in 1995. Previously a financial reporter for Reuters, Nualkhair covered the South Thailand insurgency, sustainable tourism, and regional cuisine. She publishes the Bangkok Glutton blog, is a contributor to the Michelin Guide Thailand, and is author of two Thai street food guidebooks and a Thai cookbook.

Nualkhair has commented extensively on the role informal street vendors play in the Thai economy. She criticized the 2017 Bangkok Metropolitan Administration (BMA) campaign to clear street food vendors from Bangkok's sidewalks, suggesting that more stringent zoning would diminish the creativity and innovation of the city's food culture. Citing the negative impact of COVID-19 on vendors, Nualkhair has predicted that reduced choices for consumers would diminish social cohesion and increase corporate consolidation of the food industry.

Nualkhair appeared as a guide in the Bangkok episodes of Street Food Volume 1: Asia and Somebody Feed Phil, and the "Sweet" episode of Confucius Was a Foodie, exploring desserts in Bangkok's Chinatown.

== Books ==
- Bangkok's Top 50 Street Food Stalls (2011)
- Thailand's Best Street Food: The Complete Guide to Streetside Dining in Bangkok, Phuket, Chiang Mai and Other Areas (2022)
- Real Thai Cooking: Recipes and Stories from a Thai Food Expert (2023)

== Filmography ==
Year	Title	Subject	Credit	Note
2011	Poh's Kitchen	Tastes of Thailand	Guest interviewee	
2017	Dateline	Goodbye Pad Thai	Food writer	
2018	Confucius Was a Foodie	Sweet	Guide	
2018	Somebody Feed Phil	Bangkok	Guest interviewee	Netflix series
2019	Street Food	Bangkok	Guest interviewee	Netflix series
