= Danielle Brown (dancer) =

American ballet dancer

Danielle Brown is an American ballet dancer. She joined Florida's Sarasota Ballet in 2007 where she is now a principal dancer.

== Biography ==
Born in Libertyville, Illinois, she began her ballet training at Dance Academy of Libertyville with summer courses at Milwaukee Ballet School and American Ballet Theatre. After completing her training at North Carolina School of the Arts, she joined Ballet Austin as an apprentice. After a year with the Nashville Ballet, she joined the Sarasota Ballet in 2007.

Brown's repertoire has included Frederick Ashton's Façade, The Two Pigeons, and Les Patineurs and George Balanchine's Allegro Brillante. She has also performed as a principal in works by Mikhail Fokine, John Cranko, Kenneth MacMillan and Peter Darrell. In 2013, she danced the demanding ten-minute-long Pas de Deux when she partnered Ricardo Graziano in Balanchines Diamonds at the Kennedy Center in Washington, D.C. In May 2014, she performed with "a confident richness of texture and detail" in Valses Nobles et Sentimentales and in Birthday Offering at Sarasota's Frederick Ashton Festival.
