= Danielle Brown (disambiguation) =

Danielle Brown (born 1988) is a British archer.

Danielle Brown may also refer to:

== Sports ==
- Danielle Brown (dancer) (born 1980s), American ballet dancer
- Danielle Brown (hurdler) in 2008 NACAC U23 Championships in Athletics
- Danielle Brown (tennis) in 2009 ITF Women's Circuit

== Others ==
- Danielle Brown on List of former Emmerdale characters
- Danielle Brown, pseudonym of Dan Brown
- Danielle Michelle Brown, American television personality better known as Diem Brown
