= Ricardo Graziano =

Ricardo Graziano (born in 1986) is a Brazilian ballet dancer and choreographer. After five years with the Tulsa Ballet, he joined Florida's Sarasota Ballet in 2010 where he is a principal dancer and choreographer.

== Early life ==
Born in Mogi das Cruzes, Brazil, he showed an early interest in dance, following his sister to her jazz classes from the age of eight. His mother then sent him to the Marcela Campos Escola de Bailados until he was 16. He completed his training at the Academy of Dance in Mannheim, Germany, where he spent two years.

== Career ==
Graziano began his professional career in 2003 with the Tulsa Ballet in Oklahoma where he spent five years, becoming a demi-soloist. He performed roles in Jewels, The Sleeping Beauty, Romeo and Juliet as well as in a variety of contemporary works.

In 2010, he joined Sarasota Ballet where he was quickly promoted to a principal dancer. There he has performed in Christopher Wheeldon's The American, George Balanchine's Divertimento No. 15 and The Prodigal Son, and Frederick Ashton's Les Rendezvous.

In early April 2014, artistic director Iain Webb announced that Graziano would become the company's resident choreographer in 2015. The announcement came at the end of a performance in which Graziano had excelled, both in Ashton's Birthday Offering and in Symphony of Sorrow which he choreographed himself.

== Awards ==
Graziano won first prize at the Festival de Joinville in 2002 and in the Festival de Ribeirão Preto in 2003. In 2007, he received the Lefkowitz Award for Artistic Achievement at the International Ballet Competition in New York.
