= Tessitura (disambiguation) =

Tessitura normally refers to the musical concept of an acceptable range of notes for a voice or instrument as required by a given composition.

Tessitura may also refer to:

- Tessitura (software), marketing and ticket sales software
- "Tessitura", a song by Animals as Leaders from their self-titled debut album, 2009
