= Sarasota Ballet =

American ballet company

The Sarasota Ballet
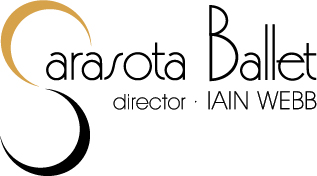
- insert a caption here

General information
- Name: The Sarasota Ballet
- Year founded: 1987
- Founder: Jean Weidner Goldstein
- Principal venue: FSU Center for the Performing Arts; Sarasota Opera House; Van Wezel Performing Arts Hall
- Website: www.sarasotaballet.org

Senior staff
- Executive Director: Joseph Volpe
- Director: Iain Webb
- Assistant Director: Margaret Barbieri

Artistic staff
- Resident Choreographers: Ricardo Graziano

Other
- Associated schools: The Margaret Barbieri Conservatory; The Sarasota Ballet School; Dance - The Next Generation

The Sarasota Ballet is an American ballet company based in Sarasota, Florida. It was founded in 1987 by former ballet dancer Jean Weidner Goldstein and is now acclaimed for its performances of Sir Frederick Ashton's ballets under its director Iain Webb and assistant director Margaret Barbieri.

== History ==
In 1987, Jean Weidner Goldstein founded The Sarasota Ballet as a presenting organization, establishing its status as a resident ballet company in 1990 with the appointment of Montreal choreographer Eddy Toussaint as its director. The first performance was presented on November 3, 1990, at the Sarasota Opera House. Robert de Warren, former director of ballet at Teatro alla Scala Milan, served as Artistic Director from 1994 - 2007. With the appointment of former Royal Ballet dancer Iain Webb as director in 2007, the company has achieved national and international recognition, especially for its many productions of the ballets of Sir Frederick Ashton. The Sarasota Ballet has been invited to perform at the Kennedy Center in Washington, D.C., with the Suzanne Farrell Ballet and Ballet Across America III, at Fall for Dance at the New York City Center, the Jacob's Pillow Dance Festival and the Joyce Theater.

At the Frederick Ashton Festival, staged at the Sarasota Opera House in May 2014, The Sarasota Ballet offered a wide selection of Ashton's works. These included Birthday Offering, Illuminations, Les Rendezvous, Sinfonietta, and Valses nobles et sentimentales. Under Webb's leadership, the company performed 135 ballets and divertissements through the 2015 - 2016 season, including 36 world premieres and 7 American premieres. For their 25th anniversary season (2015–2016), The Sarasota Ballet became the first American company to present Ashton's ballets Marguerite and Armand and Enigma Variations. During Iain Webb's directorship, ticket sales grew from $300,000 in 2007 to over $1.675 million in 2015.

In February 2016, Joseph Volpe, retired general manager of the Metropolitan Opera, was appointed executive director.

== Ballet company ==
The company includes thirty-seven professional dancers and eight apprentices (as of 2019) from around the world, many of them young Americans. Among the principals are Danielle Brown, Kate Honea, Victoria Hulland, Ricardo Graziano, Ricardo Rhodes and Luke Schaufuss. The Sarasota Ballet also maintains a Studio Company for supplementary performance support and cooperation with other local performing arts organizations.

In August 2012, Margaret Barbieri, former principal dancer of the Royal Ballet, was appointed assistant director of The Sarasota Ballet. Barbieri has staged 22 ballets for The Sarasota Ballet, including Sir Peter Wright's Giselle and Summertide; Sir Frederick Ashton's The Two Pigeons, Façade, Birthday Offering, Les Patineurs, Les Rendezvous, La fille mal gardée, Valses nobles et sentimentales and Jazz Calendar; Dame Ninette de Valois' Checkmate and The Rake's Progress; John Cranko's Pineapple Poll; Christopher Wheeldon's There Where She Loved and The American; Michel Fokine's Les Sylphides and Petrushka and Rudolf Nureyev's Raymonda Act III.
