= William Dougherty (composer) =

American composer

William Dougherty (born 1988) is an American composer. He is the recipient of the 2021 Luciano Berio Rome Prize in Music Composition from the American Academy in Rome, the Charles Ives Scholarship from the American Academy of Arts and Letters, a Marshall Scholarship from the Marshall Aid Commemoration Commission, and residencies at the Civitella Ranieri Foundation, Cité Internationale des Arts, the Copland House, and the Internationalen Gesellschaft für Neue Musik (IGNM) Valais Residency at Schloss Leuk.

== Education ==
Dougherty earned a BM degree from Temple University in 2010. He was awarded a Marshall Scholarship to pursue graduate studies at the Royal College of Music, where he earned an MMus in 2012 studying with Kenneth Hesketh and Mark-Anthony Turnage. From 2012 to 2014, Dougherty continued his studies with Georg Friedrich Haas as an Ergänzungsstudium student at the Hochschule für Musik Basel. In 2019, Dougherty completed the Cursus in computer music composition at IRCAM in Paris. He received his DMA degree from Columbia University in 2021 where he studied with Fred Lerdahl, George Lewis, and Georg Friedrich Haas.

== Music ==
Dougherty's compositions have been performed internationally by ensembles including Slagwerk den Haag, JACK Quartet, The London Chorus, Asko|Schönberg, oenm, TILT Brass, Ensemble for New Music Tallinn, UMS ´n JIP, and Talea Ensemble.

His music has been featured in festivals such as IRCAM's ManiFeste (2019), musikprotokoll (2018), Gaudeamus Muziekweek (2018), MATA Festival (2018), Donaueschingen Musiktage (2017), New Music Miami (2017), Tectonics Festival New York (2015), the New York City Electroacoustic Music Festival (2015), the 47th Internationale Ferienkurse für Neue Musik in Darmstadt (2014), the New York Philharmonic Biennale (2014), and broadcast on BBC Radio 3.

Jeffrey Arlo Brown wrote that Dougherty's "Three Formants for five trombones (2014) is like a more concentrated version of Stockhausen’s Stimmung, heavy on vocal sounds, haptic tremolos, stereophonic motion and gorgeous chords. hyper electric for two electric guitars and two double basses (2018) is fragile and pensive, shot through with feedback and noise."

== Writing ==
Dougherty has contributed articles, interviews, and reviews to VAN Magazine, Music & Literature, and Tempo. He specializes in the field of American experimental music and the music of composers Éliane Radigue and Horatiu Radulescu. He is currently the Editor-in-chief of openwork, a peer-reviewed interdisciplinary journal that publishes research into experimental music, art and scholarship.

== Discography ==
Stimmungen: mikrotonale Musik für Zither with Martin Mallaun, (Loewenhertz, 2020)

Music from SEAMUS, vol. 26 with Zone Experimental, Basel, (SEAMUS Records, 2017)

Oracle’s Blast with Wiktor Kociuban, Demetre Gamsachurdia, (DUX Recording Producers, 2015)

== Selected works ==
- Megadont (2013) for three baritone saxophones
- Into Focus (2014) for violin and orchestra
- Three Formants (2014) for five trombones
- Intersections (2015) for flute, saxophone, percussion, two pianos, accordion, and sine tones
- a stillness of zero sensation (2015) for flute, bass clarinet, violin, cello, and piano
- the new normal (2016) for large ensemble and fixed media
- Traum im traum (2017) for meantone tuned zither and sine tones
- hyper electric (2018) for two electric guitars and two double basses
- soft brown wax (2019) for three trumpets, three trombones, augmented piano, and fixed media

== Articles, interviews, and reviews ==
- Dougherty, William (2014). "On Horatiu Radulescu's Fifth String Quartet ('Before the Universe Was Born') Op. 89". Tempo. 68 (268): 34–45.
- Dougherty, William (2016). "La Monte Young Trio for Strings Original Full Length Version, Dia 15 VI 13 545 West 22 Street Dream House, New York City". Tempo. 70 (275): 99–100.
- Oliveros, Pauline (2016). "Listening, Not Hearing: An Interview with Pauline Oliveros." VAN Magazine. Interviewed by William Dougherty.
- Dougherty, William (2016). "Phill Niblock's 'Winter Solstice' at Roulette, Brooklyn, New York". Tempo. 70 (277): 97–98.
- Dougherty, William (2016). "Horatiu Radulescu's Piano Sonatas & String Quartets, Vol. 1". Music & Literature.
- Crumb, George (2016). "Unified Music: An Interview with George Crumb". VAN Magazine. Interview by William Dougherty.
- Johnston, Ben (2018). "I Did That: An Interview with Ben Johnston." VAN Magazine. Interview by William Dougherty.
- Dougherty, William (2019). "Imagined Music, the problem of deterritorialization". LINKs–series. 3–4: 18–19.
