= Iain Webb =

English ballet dancer and choreographer

Iain Webb (born 30 March 1959) is an English ballet dancer who formerly danced for the Royal Ballet in London. He is currently Director of Florida's Sarasota Ballet where he has staged many of Frederick Ashton's ballets.

== Biography ==
The son of a fireman and plumber, Webb grew up in Yorkshire in the north of England. From the age of 16, he trained at the Rambert School of Ballet and at the Royal Ballet School. By 1989, he was a soloist dancer at the Royal Ballet, performing leading roles in works such as Ashton's The Dream, Fokine's Les Sylphides and Balanchine's The Prodigal Son. In 1996, he retired as an active dancer, becoming a rehearsal director for Matthew Bourne's productions of Swan Lake and Cinderella.

In 1999, he joined Japan's newly established K-Ballet, first as ballet master then as assistant director. He has also co-directed Adam Cooper's ballet company and has produced international performances involving the Royal Danish Ballet, Paris Opera Ballet, New York City Ballet and Stuttgart Ballet.

In 2007, Webb became director of the Sarasota Ballet where he has staged over 100 productions including 16 world premieres. He attributes much of his success to the support of his wife Margaret Barbieri who while at the Royal Ballet worked closely with masters including Ashton, John Cranko, Kenneth MacMillan and Ninette de Valois. Webb's productions have also included classical works by George Balanchine, Antony Tudor and Agnes de Mille and more recent ballets by Twyla Tharp and Christopher Wheeldon. Sarasota Ballet was in a dreadful financial position at the beginning of his term but Webb has managed to increase ticket sales by a factor of four, restoring the company's viability.

In May 2014, Webb staged Sarasota Ballet's widely acclaimed Frederick Ashton Festival with a wide selection of Ashton's works, including Birthday Offering, Illuminations, Les Rendezvous, Sinfonietta, and Valses Nobles et Sentimentales.
