= Peter Gelb =

American arts administrator (born 1953)

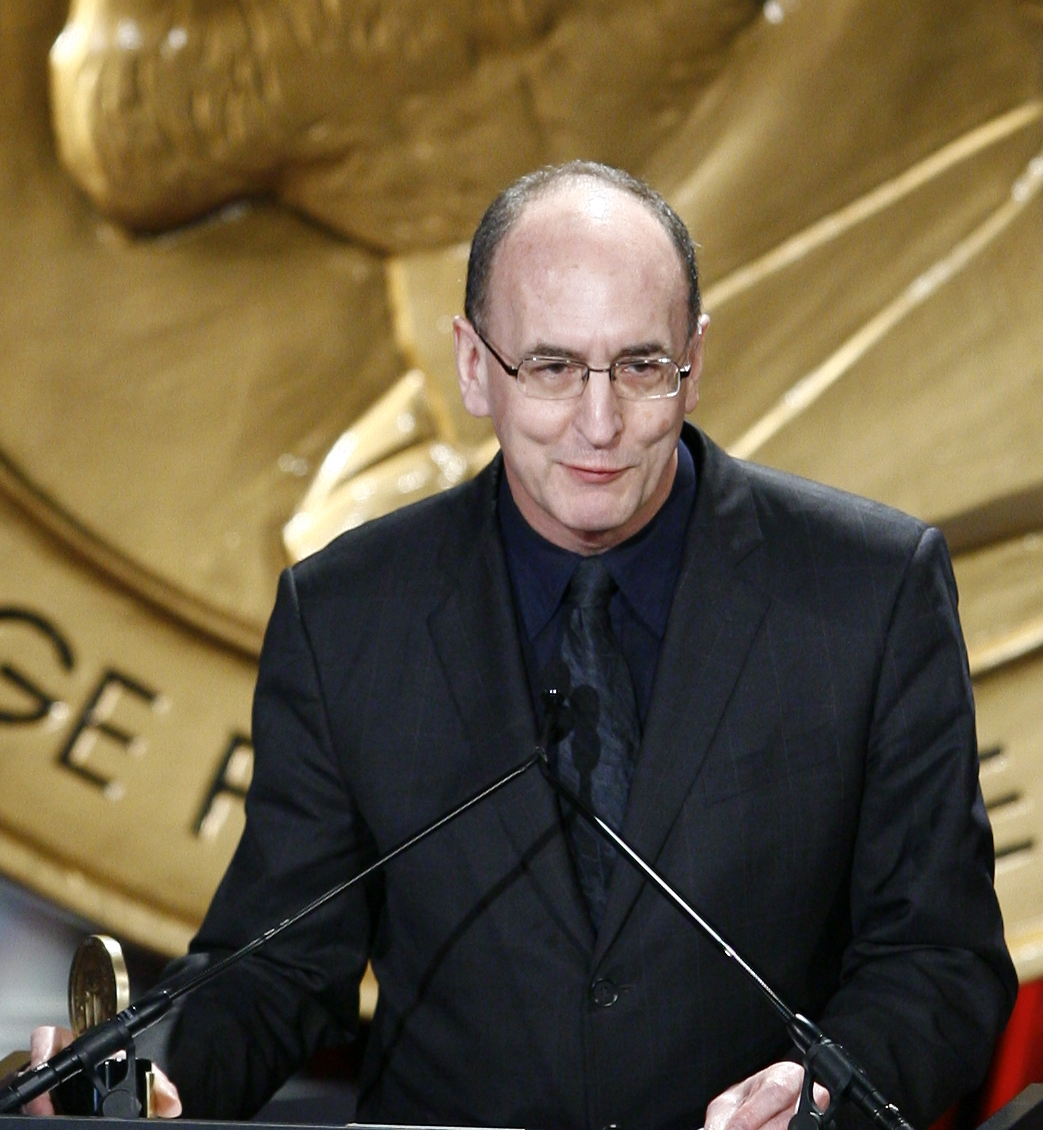
Peter Gelb at the 68th Annual Peabody Awards

Peter Gelb (born 1953) is an American arts administrator. Since August 2006, he has been general manager of the Metropolitan Opera in New York City.

== Career ==
=== Early career ===
While in high school, Gelb began his association with the Metropolitan Opera as an usher. At age 17, Gelb began his career in classical music as an office boy to impresario Sol Hurok.

Gelb managed the Boston Symphony Orchestra’s 1979 China tour. The following year Gelb became Vladimir Horowitz's manager. Gelb assisted the pianist in the revival of his performing career, and managed his return to Russia in 1986.

In 1982, Gelb founded, and was president of, CAMI Video, a division of Columbia Artists Management. In this capacity, for six years he was executive producer of "The Metropolitan Opera Presents", the Met's series of televised opera broadcasts. Gelb produced 25 televised productions for the Met.

=== Sony Classical ===
Gelb was president of Sony Classical Records from 1995 to 2006. Gelb pursued a strategy of emphasizing crossover music over mainstream classical repertoire. Examples include cellist Yo-Yo Ma, who was encouraged to record Americana, including an album with fiddler and composer Mark O'Connor and double-bassist and composer Edgar Meyer, Appalachia Waltz; electronic composer Vangelis, who recorded the choral symphony Mythodea; and Charlotte Church, a pop artist who started her career as a classical singer.

=== Metropolitan Opera ===
Gelb became the 16th general manager of the Metropolitan Opera, taking over from Joseph Volpe, on August 1, 2006. He launched his tenure with several new productions, including Madama Butterfly directed by Anthony Minghella; The Barber of Seville by Bartlett Sher; and Tan Dun's new opera The First Emperor directed by Zhang Yimou.

Gelb launched a number of new ventures for the Met, such as taking advantage of new media technology to distribute Met performances to a wider global audience. This became The Met: Live in HD series, the Met becoming the first performing arts company to offer live high-definition broadcasts of its operas to cinemas and other performing arts centers in many countries of the world. The series gained both a Peabody and an Emmy Award. Digitally recorded performances were later offered on public television stations and released on DVDs and for streaming via Met Opera on Demand.

During his tenure at the Met, Gelb has spearheaded the production of contemporary works, including the staging of two of John Adams's operas, Doctor Atomic and Nixon in China, with a third Adams opera, The Death of Klinghoffer, premiering in October 2014. His other ideas have included an annual "family-oriented" presentation at Christmas time, and collaborations with Lincoln Center Theater to develop new musical works with musicians such as Wynton Marsalis, Rachel Portman, and Rufus Wainwright. In January 2007 Gelb announced a commission for a new opera from Osvaldo Golijov, tentatively scheduled for the 2010–11 season. However, following the death in 2008 of Anthony Minghella who was to have written the libretto, the premiere was postponed to 2018.

Gelb, whose contract was extended in November 2019 until 2027, has taken measures to increase ticket sales, suspending performances in February when sales are slowest, extending the season until June, and adding Sunday matinees. The Met also instituted Fridays under 40, a program offering discounted tickets to younger audience members.

The Met also raised the number of new productions, including those of recent operas and works written for the Met. In 2021–22, in collaboration with Met Music Director Yannick Nezet-Seguin, he programmed three contemporary works and seven new productions in 2022–23.

Gelb has also diversified casts and staff at the Met. Fire Shut Up in My Bones, which opened the 2021–22 season, was the first work on the Met stage by a Black composer and featured the Met's first Black director, Camille A. Brown (who co-directed with James Robinson). X: The Life and Times of Malcolm X by Anthony Davis received a new production in the fall of 2023. Gelb also named three composers of color to its commissioning program: Valerie Coleman, Jessie Montgomery, and Joel Thomson. In 2021, he appointed Marcia Sells as the Met's first chief diversity officer. Five women conductors took the podium in 2021–22, the most ever in a Met season.

In 2025, Gelb negotiated an agreement with the Kingdom of Saudi Arabia under which the Met would receive more than $200 million over 8 years in exchange for an annual winter residency at the Royal Diriyah Opera House in Riyadh. This donation was in the wake of financial difficulties that had led the Met to withdraw more than a third of the money in its endowment fund.

In January 2026, Gelb stated that the contribution from the Saudis had been delayed and as a result, the Met would be reducing the number of productions in its next season, laying off 22 employees, and was considering selling the Chagall murals that had been commissioned for the opera house's lobby. In April, the Saudis officially withdrew their offer of funds.

=== Metropolitan Opera and the pandemic ===
In 2020, while live performances were on hiatus due to the pandemic, Gelb organized the start of Nightly Met Opera Streams, free online presentations of archival performances. The program lasted 16 months, with over 20 million views.

In July 2020, The Met launched the Met Stars Live in Concert initiative, a pay-per-view service.

=== Metropolitan Opera and Ukraine ===
Under Gelb's leadership, the Metropolitan Opera acted to express solidarity with Ukraine over the full-scale Russian invasion. Within days of the attack, the Met Opera and its chorus sang the Ukrainian national anthem ahead of a regularly-scheduled performance. Two weeks later, the Met organized a benefit concert on behalf of Ukraine.

Gelb, in cooperation with the Polish National Opera, helped organize the Ukrainian Freedom Orchestra, which was made up of Ukrainian musicians from inside and outside their home country. The orchestra, led by Gelb's wife, the conductor Keri-Lynn Wilson, toured during the summer of 2022, traveling to 12 cities in Europe and the United States to express support for Ukraine and to raise money for its people. The Met has continued to present Russian works and engage Russian singers, performing Tchaikovsky's “Eugene Onegin” in the spring of 2022 and Shostakovich's “Lady Macbeth of Mtsensk” in the fall of 2023.

== Awards and recognitions ==
In 2013, Gelb received the Sanford Prize from the Yale School of Music, and was named Chevalier de la Légion d’honneur by the French President. In 2019, he received the Gold Medal from the National Institute of Social Sciences. On May 28, 2020, Italian President Sergio Mattarella decorated Gelb as an Ufficiale nell’Ordine della Stella d’Italia. He was awarded Ukraine's Order of Merit by President Volodymyr Zelenskyy in August 2022.

In 2019, Gelb received an Honorary Doctorate from the Manhattan School of Music.

== Controversies ==
Gelb's history at Sony Classical prompted concern amongst opera critics that came to light upon his appointment as general manager. He responded to fears that he would dilute the Met's artistic standards as he seeks a wider audience for the company, saying “I think what I’m doing is exactly what the Met engaged me to do, which is build bridges to a broader public. This is not about dumbing down the Met, it’s just making it accessible."

Gelb's relationship with the press during his time at the Met has repeatedly become strained. In 2012, his new production of Der Ring des Nibelungen — and, by extension, his tenure as the company's general manager — received poor reviews. Radio station WQXR-FM rescinded a blog post by critic Olivia Giovetti, reportedly after Gelb complained to the station's chief executive. Giovetti's piece opined that the Met under Gelb "bears the mothball-like scent of an oligarchy." In a phone call to the station, Gelb called the piece "awful and nasty."

Weeks later, following an equally critical essay about the Met under Gelb by Brian Kellow and a negative review of the Met's new production of The Ring, the magazine Opera News — produced by the Met Opera Guild, a support organization — announced it would no longer review Metropolitan Opera productions. Gelb said the decision was made “in collaboration with the guild". However, due to negative public reaction, the decision was quickly reversed.

In 2014 Gelb and the Met were dogged by new controversy with a production of John Adams's opera The Death of Klinghoffer, due to criticism that the work was antisemitic. In response to the controversy Gelb canceled the scheduled worldwide HD video presentation of a performance, but refused demands to cancel the live performances scheduled for October and November 2014. Demonstrators held signs and chanted "Shame on Gelb" at those performances.

Gelb was contacted by a police detective in October 2016 about allegations of sexual abuse of a minor by Met conductor James Levine. Gelb had been aware of the accuser's abuse allegations since they were made in a 2016 police report, and of the attendant police investigation, but did not suspend Levine or launch an investigation until over a year later. Classical music blogger, former Village Voice music critic, and Juilliard School faculty member, Greg Sandow said at the time: "Everybody in the classical music business at least since the 1980s has talked about Levine as a sex abuser. The investigation should have been done decades ago." Pulitzer Prize-winning music critic Justin Davidson mused: "I’m not sure the Met can survive Levine’s disgrace." Similarly, The Wall Street Journal's drama critic Terry Teachout wrote an article entitled: “The Levine Cataclysm: How allegations against James Levine of sexual misconduct with teenagers could topple the entire Metropolitan Opera”.

== Personal life ==
Peter Gelb is the son of Arthur Gelb, a former managing editor of The New York Times, and writer Barbara Gelb.

Gelb is married to conductor Keri-Lynn Wilson. He has two children from a previous marriage. His elder son, David Gelb, is a film director and cinematographer, most known for his documentary Jiro Dreams of Sushi. His younger son, Matthew Gelb, is a film editor based in New York City.

== Videography ==
- The Metropolitan Opera Gala 1991, Deutsche Grammophon DVD, 00440–073–4582, 2010
- New Year's Eve Concert 1992: Richard Strauss Gala, Kultur Video DVD, D4209, 2007
- Dvořák in Prague: a Celebration (1993), Kultur Video DVD, D4211, 2007

| Preceded by Joseph Volpe | General manager of the Metropolitan Opera; 2006-present | Incumbent |
