= Olivia Giovetti =

American journalist

- Born: September 25, 1985 (age 40)
- Occupation: Writer
- Years active: 2007–present
- Spouse: Lawson Marlowe (m. 2010)

Olivia Giovetti (sometimes Olivia Marlowe-Giovetti) is an American author, journalist, music critic and radio personality of Italian and Syrian descent.

== Career ==
Giovetti is a former host of The New Canon, a weekly show as part of the programming for Q2 Music, an affiliate of WQXR-FM in New York. Giovetti has also appeared on-air for WQXR proper and writes for the station's website. Her work with The New Canon has made her a prominent figure within the contemporary classical scene in New York, bringing composers like David Lang, David T. Little, Steven Mackey, and John Luther Adams to wider audiences with interactive interviews. Her work with the station has been featured in notable media publications, including New York magazine, NPR, and Alex Ross's blog "The Rest is Noise."

In 2012, a blog post written by Giovetti that was critical of the Metropolitan Opera's new production of Der Ring des Nibelungen and the company's general manager, Peter Gelb, was rescinded from WQXR's opera blog after Gelb personally complained to the station. The incident was reported by The New York Times and later made the paper's front page when a similar story of Gelb's strained relationship to the press was reported.

In 2013, Giovetti premiered a scene from a new opera she wrote with composer Mohammed Fairouz, based on the life of Benazir Bhutto, at the Brooklyn Academy of Music. In 2018, she published an investigative report on the effects of the Me Too movement in classical music agencies for VAN Magazine, revealing that an artist had locked one of his former managers in his apartment in an attempt to force her into sex. For VAN, Giovetti has also covered her father's suicide via Richard Wagner's The Flying Dutchman, Schubert's Winterreise in the context of East German author Christa Wolf and the 2017 Unite the Right rally, and her relationship with Dmitri Hvorostovsky. Giovetti also wrote about her father's suicide and the journals of Spalding Gray for online literary magazine The Millions, where she also noted that she had written a novel.

Giovetti was previously known for her work as the classical and opera editor for Time Out New York, and has also written for The Washington Post, Gramophone, and Playbill. She was also a columnist for Classical Singer magazine. In her writings, Giovetti has noted that her classical connections extend on her Italian side to ancestors who worked with Giuseppe Verdi.

Giovetti's father committed suicide on September 11, 1992.

In 2010, Giovetti married Lawson Marlowe, the son of screenwriter-producers Andrew W. Marlowe and Terri Edda Miller.
