= Andrew Rosenthal =

American journalist

- Born: Andrew Mark Rosenthal; February 25, 1956 (age 70); New Delhi, India
- Education: University of Denver (BA)
- Occupation: Journalist
- Notable credit: The New York Times
- Spouse: Mary Beth Bierut (m. 1994)
- Father: A. M. Rosenthal

Andrew Mark Rosenthal (born February 25, 1956) is an American journalist and former editorial page editor of The New York Times. He is the son of A. M. Rosenthal, a longtime New York Times senior executive and executive editor.

While at The New York Times, he managed the paper's opinion pages, their editorial board, and the Letters and Op-Ed departments. As the paper maintained separation between editorial and journalistic operations, Rosenthal reported directly to paper's publisher.

== Early life and education ==
Rosenthal was born in New Delhi, India. He is the son of Ann Marie (née Burke), a secretary, and A.M. Rosenthal, the former New York Times executive editor. His father was Jewish, and his mother was of Irish Catholic descent.

Rosenthal graduated from the University of Denver with a B.A. in American history in 1978.

== Career ==
After graduating from college, Rosenthal worked at the Associated Press, where he served as Moscow bureau chief.

Rosenthal joined The New York Times in March 1987. In Washington, D.C., Rosenthal covered the Bush Administration, the 1988 and 1992 presidential elections, and the Gulf War. In 2000, he served as national editor, covering the 2000 United States presidential election.

He became editorial page editor on January 8, 2007, and he served in that role until April 2016, longer than any other editorial page editor in the modern history of The New York Times. Rosenthal's successor as editorial page editor was James Bennet. In March 2016, Rosenthal stepped down as editorial page editor after he had served in that role for over nine years. Rosenthal transitioned to become an online opinion columnist and podcast contributor for The New York Times.

In April 2021, Rosenthal was recruited as new editor-in-chief of Bulletin, a small, scandal-plagued online newspaper in Sweden. In February 2022, Bulletin was declared bankrupt by Stockholm District Court due to unpaid debts.

He is a member of the Council on Foreign Relations.
