= Brian McGinn =

American director and producer

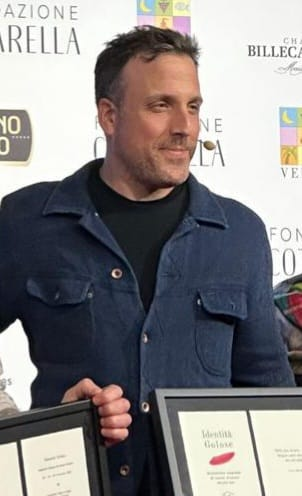
- Born: October 12, 1984 (age 41); Palo Alto, California
- Education: Palo Alto High School
- Alma mater: Duke University
- Occupations: television director; television producer; film producer; screenwriter; showrunner
- Years active: 2012–present

Brian McGinn (born December 10, 1984) is an American TV and film director, writer, producer and showrunner.

== Life and career ==
Brian McGinn was born in Palo Alto, California, on December 10, 1984. His mother was an art history librarian and his father an ethics and technology professor from Stanford. He attended Palo Alto High School and Duke University, where he got in 2007 a degree in English and a certificate in the Film/Video/Digital Program.

His first directing, producing and writing credits were on the short films Llamas for Ken (2007) and The Frozen City (2008) -which received an honorable mention at the 2009 Cleveland International Film Festival- and Carry (2009).

Between 2011 and 2014 he directed a series viral videos for the comedy video website and film and television production company Funny or Die starring high school classmate Dave Franco, Christopher Mintz-Plasse and Alison Brie as well as Funny or Die’s HBO 2015 special Ferrell Takes The Field starring Will Ferrell.

In 2011, he codirected with Vanessa Roth the documentary film American Teacher and in 2012 he wrote and directed The Record Breaker, a short film about Ashrita Furman, the man who has the most Guinness World Records of all time. The documentary won awards at the Big Sky Documentary Film Festival, the Full Frame Documentary Film Festival, the Palm Springs International ShortFest, the Cleveland International Film Festival and the New Orleans Film Festival.

Since 2015 he is one of the executive producers and directors of Netflix’s documentary series Chef’s Table, which gave him three nominations to the Emmy Awards. He got other two Emmy nominations for the Netflix documentary Amanda Knox, which he has produced, written and directed.

Along with David Gelb, his partner in the production company Supper Club with Jason Sterman, McGinn is one of the executive producers of the Netflix series Street Food.

In 2019 he produced the film Machine –a documentary about Artificial Intelligence– and in 2020 he produced the Netflix show Trial By Media, where he also directed a chapter.

As executive producer, he was behind several Disney+ original documentaries such as Marvel's 616, People & Places –a revival of a show originally aired in the ‘50s and ‘60s-, A Spark Story, More Than Robots and Earthkeepers.

He also was the producer of the Disney+ documentary films Obi-Wan Kenobi: A Jedi's Return, Olivia Rodrigo: Driving Home 2 U and Wolfgang. He is also the writer of the latter film about the chef Wolfgang Puck.

== Awards and nominations ==
Year	Award	Result	Category	Work
2012	Jury Award - Palm Springs International ShortFest	Winner	Best documentary	The Record Breaker
2012	SXSW Grand Jury Award - SXSW Film Festival	Nominee	Narrative Short	Would You
2013	Grand Jury Award - New Orleans Film Festival	Winner	Documentary Short	The Record Breaker
2013	The Spalding and Jackson Award: In Celebration of Joy - Cleveland International Film Festival	Winner	Honorable Mention	The Record Breaker
2013	Full Frame Documentary Film Festival	Winner	Audience Award	The Record Breaker
2014	Big Sky Documentary Film Festival	Winner	Best Short Documentary	The Record Breaker
2015	International Documentary Association	Winner	Best Episodic Series	Chef's Table
2016	International Documentary Association	Nominee	Best Episodic Series	Chef's Table
2016	Critics' Choice Documentary Award	Nominee	Best Director (TV/Streaming)	Amanda Knox
2016	Primetime Emmy Awards	Nominee	Outstanding Documentary or Nonfiction Series	Chef's Table
2017	International Documentary Association	Nominee	Best Episodic Series	Chef's Table
2017	Webby Awards and Webby People’s Voice Award	Winner	Best Food & Drink Video and the Webby Award for Best Documentary: Series (Film & Video)	Chef's Table
2017	Primetime Emmy Awards	Nominee	Outstanding Documentary or Nonfiction Special	Amanda Knox
2017	Primetime Emmy Awards	Nominee	Outstanding Writing for Nonfiction Programming	Amanda Knox
2017	Primetime Emmy Awards	Nominee	Outstanding Documentary or Nonfiction Series	Chef's Table
2017	Danish Film Academy (Robert Awards)	Nominee	Best Documentary	Amanda Knox
2019	Primetime Emmy Awards	Nominee	Outstanding Documentary or Nonfiction Series	Chef's Table
