= Barbara Gelb =

American journalist

- Born: Barbara Stone; February 6, 1926; Manhattan, New York, U.S.
- Died: February 9, 2017 (aged 91); Manhattan, New York, U.S.
- Occupations: Author; playwright; journalist
- Known for: Eugene O'Neill biographies
- Spouse: Arthur Gelb (m. 1946; died 2014)
- Children: Two (including Peter)
- Relatives: David Gelb (grandson)

Barbara Gelb (née Stone; February 6, 1926 – February 9, 2017) was an American author, playwright, and journalist. She, along with her husband Arthur, wrote three biographies of the Nobel laureate playwright Eugene O'Neill.

== Background ==
Barbara Stone was born in 1926 in Manhattan, New York. Her father was heir to a prosperous chain of five-and-dime stores; her mother was a Russian immigrant and sister of the violinist Jascha Heifetz. When she was nine, her parents divorced; her mother married S. N. Behrman, a journalist, screenwriter, and playwright. Stone was sent to boarding school, in order not to disturb Behrman's writing. At 16, she entered Swarthmore College but became preoccupied with theatrical and literary activities and dropped out to work as a copygirl for The New York Times's editorial board. It was there that she met a copyboy and future husband, whom she would marry in 1946.

== Writing career ==
Gelb became a freelance journalist, after losing the job at The Times to a returning World War II veteran. She wrote profiles on literary and entertainment figures, book reviews, and travel and lifestyle articles, mostly for The Times and its magazine.

Gelb also wrote books centered on the New York City Police Department: On the Track of Murder in 1975, and Varnished Brass: The Decade After Serpico in 1983.

== Eugene O'Neill biographies ==
Following Eugene O'Neill's death in 1953, public interest about him regenerated. Harper & Brothers Publications asked Brooks Atkinson, chief theater critic of The Times, to write a biography. Atkinson declined but suggested Arthur Gelb could write it, with Barbara's help. The book O'Neill, published in 1962 and detailing his boyhood and life as a seaman, became a best seller.

A second biography was commissioned, but Arthur declined due to his burgeoning journalism career. Instead, in 1973, Barbara wrote So Short a Time: A Biography of John Reed and Louise Bryant, which chronicled the love triangle involving O'Neill, Reed and Bryant. Warren Beatty asked her to be a consultant on Reds, a film he was developing about Reed. He later changed his mind on her counsel, but a contract had been drawn up. Following the film's release, she sued and received an out-of-court settlement.

In 1987, she also wrote a one-woman play about O'Neill's third wife Carlotta Monterey, titled My Gene.

In 2000, the Gelbs' second collaboration, O'Neill: Life With Monte Cristo, was published and detailed his formative years. A third biography, By Women Possessed: A Life of Eugene O'Neill, focusing on four women closest to him, was started. However, Arthur died in 2014. (Barbara wrote the novels; Arthur edited them.) She completed it for publishing in 2016.

== Personal life ==
The Gelbs married at the Behrman's apartment in June 1946 and lived with Arthur's parents for six months, due to a postwar housing shortage. They had two sons: Peter, who is General Manager of the Metropolitan Opera, and Michael.

== Death ==
Gelb died in Manhattan, on February 9, 2017, just days after her 91st birthday.
