= Joseph Volpe (opera manager) =

American opera manager and arts management consultant

Joseph Volpe (born July 2, 1940) is an American opera manager and arts management consultant. He is noted for his long association with the Metropolitan Opera, in which he served as general manager from 1990 to 2006. In all, he spent 42 years working at the Met in various capacities, rising rapidly to managerial positions. Since February 2016, he has been executive director of the Sarasota Ballet.

== Early life ==
Volpe was born in Brooklyn in New York City, to an Italian family. While living in Long Island, he opened his own auto mechanic business in high school. After a fire at the auto garage, he worked as a theatrical carpenter on Broadway. In lieu of college, Volpe joined the Metropolitan Opera in August 1964 as an apprentice carpenter.

== Career at the Metropolitan Opera ==
=== Rise from carpenter ===
Volpe became the Metropolitan Opera's master carpenter in 1966, having joined the company's carpentry division in 1964 as an apprentice. He became technical director of the Met in 1978. In 1981, he was appointed assistant manager of the Met, and retained that position for nine years. His accomplishments in that capacity included managing the company's re-entry into the commercial recording field.

Volpe became the opera's general manager in August 1990. He was the first head of the Metropolitan Opera to advance from within the ranks of the company's management.

=== Artistic management ===
As general manager, Volpe reduced the number of operas repeating from prior seasons and increased the overall length of the season. During his tenure, several world premieres were given, including commissions made under his aegis, such as Tan Dun's The First Emperor, presented in the 2006–07 season. The Met's repertory further expanded with 22 works given their Met premieres during Volpe's 16 seasons as general manager – more new works than under any general manager since Giulio Gatti-Casazza, who ran the company from 1908 to 1935.

Volpe expanded the Met's international touring activities. The company visited Spain's Expo '92, Germany in 1994, and Japan in 1993, 1997, 2001, and 2006. In addition, under Volpe, frequent tours and recordings of symphonic repertoire by the Met orchestra were inaugurated, as well as an annual series at Carnegie Hall. The orchestra made European concert tours in 1996 and 1999, and a tour of the United States in 1998. In August 2002, the orchestra gave concerts at the Salzburg Festival, the Lucerne Festival, the Baden-Baden Festival and the Rheingau Musik Festival.

In 1994, Volpe terminated the contract of star soprano Kathleen Battle, due to repeated disruptive behavior. Future engagements with Battle were canceled as well.

Volpe named Russian conductor Valery Gergiev as the company's Principal Guest Conductor in 1997.

In 1998, Volpe instituted an education project for young children in cooperation with the New York City Department of Education and endowed by the Texaco Foundation. The program emphasizes direct experience with music and opera for students in New York City schools. The children come to the Metropolitan Opera House for backstage tours, followed by attendance at dress rehearsals, and artists from the Metropolitan Opera are frequently sent to participating schools for educational presentations. Volpe also established a partnership with the University of Connecticut that provides students from the music and drama departments with behind-the-scenes access to the creative processes taking place in the opera house. The Met outreach under Volpe also included the "Cultural Passport" program with the City University of New York (CUNY), offering a special program for honors students and teachers-in-training to familiarize them with opera.

=== Technical innovations ===
Volpe conceived and developed "Met Titles", which were introduced during the 1995–96 season opening night performance of Otello. This system provides individual screens for surtitles screens on the backs of the seats for those members of the audience who wish to utilize them, but with little distraction for those who do not.

In 1998, Volpe initiated the development of a new management software program, called Tessitura. Tessitura uses a single database of information to record, track and manage all contacts with the Met's constituents, conduct targeted marketing and fund raising appeals, handle all ticketing and membership transactions, and provide detailed and flexible performance reports. Beginning in 2000, Tessitura was offered under license to other arts organizations, and it is now used by a network of more than 200 opera companies, symphony orchestras, ballet companies, theater companies, performing arts centers, and museums in the United States, Canada, the United Kingdom, Australia, New Zealand, and Ireland.

=== Fiscal management and marketing ===
Sound fiscal management and various marketing initiatives, permitting the Met to maintain high musical and production standards, characterized Volpe's tenure. In addition, Volpe's customer care initiative, begun in 1996, steadily improved the Met's responsiveness to its customers' needs. Volpe inaugurated consumer-friendly services like automated ticket sales, varied subscription packages, and a more liberal ticket exchange policy.

Volpe strengthened the Met's administration through a re-organization, naming assistant managers responsible to the general manager for specific areas of operations. Labor relations under Volpe's management were without significant contract disputes for over two decades, the longest period of labor peace in the company's history. In fact, Volpe's successor Peter Gelb hired him in February 2010 to represent the Met in its various negotiations with labor unions.

Volpe successfully opposed major aspects of Lincoln Center's 21st-century redevelopment plans: a proposal to build a glass dome over the entire plaza and plans to construct a new theater for the New York City Opera in Damrosch Park. In Volpe's view, Lincoln Center needed refurbishing, but not a drastic redesign costing hundreds of millions of dollars.

Although the Met suffered ill effects experienced by many arts organizations in New York City following the September 11 attacks, sound fiscal management, including marketing initiatives and continued strong fundraising, permitted the Met to maintain its musical and production standards. To ensure affordable access to Met performances for a broad range customers, Volpe maintained a wide variety of ticket prices and subscription packages.

=== Retirement ===
In February 2004, Volpe announced his intention to retire, citing a desire to spend time on the personal interests which he had neglected while at his "all-consuming" position at the Met. On August 1, 2006, Peter Gelb became his successor as general manager.

== Career outside the Met ==
Volpe has been a guest lecturer at Columbia University and the University of Pennsylvania's Wharton School of Business, as well as at the "Models of Leadership" course for New York University's Stern School of Business, where he teaches a course entitled "Managing in the Performing Arts".

After leaving the Met, Volpe joined Giuliani Partners, the firm founded by the former New York City mayor after he left office, as a senior vice president. His job was to bring in cultural clients, manage noncultural projects, and draw on the many contacts he made through opera. However, Volpe missed working in theatrical endeavors and left in January 2008. In 2008, he joined Theater Projects Consultants, a leading theater design firm, at its American headquarters in South Norwalk, Connecticut. Volpe was appointed executive director of the Sarasota Ballet in February 2016.

== Personal life ==
He is married to Jean Anderson Volpe, a former ballet dancer. Together, Joseph and Jean have a daughter. The Volpe family resides in Manhattan and Sarasota.

== Memoir ==
Volpe's 2006 memoir, The Toughest Show on Earth: My Rise and Reign at the Metropolitan Opera, published by Knopf, describes his 42 years at the Met. The memoir also includes an overview of the history of the Metropolitan Opera, beginning with its origins in 1880.

Preceded by Hugh Southern	General Manager of the Metropolitan Opera; 1990–2006	Succeeded by Peter Gelb
