= Wolfgang (2021 film) =

- Official poster
- Directed by: David Gelb
- Written by: Brian McGinn
- Produced by: David Gelb; Jason Sterman; Brian McGinn
- Starring: Wolfgang Puck
- Cinematography: Will Basanta
- Edited by: Arielle Zakowski; Brad Grossman
- Music by: Stenfert Charles
- Production company: Supper Club
- Distributed by: Disney+
- Release dates: June 12, 2021 (Tribeca); June 25, 2021 (United States)
- Running time: 78 minutes
- Country: United States
- Language: English

Wolfgang is a 2021 American documentary film, directed and produced by David Gelb. It follows the life and career of chef Wolfgang Puck.

It had its world premiere at the Tribeca Film Festival on June 12, 2021. It was released on June 25, 2021, by Disney+. The film was removed from Disney+ on May 26, 2023.

== Synopsis ==
The movie follows the life and career of chef Wolfgang Puck. Beginning with his childhood in Austria, his culinary training in France, and his move to the United States, where he became a prominent figure in the development of California cuisine.

The documentary traces the opening and success of his restaurant Spago, which helped establish his reputation in Los Angeles, and examines his expansion into a global restaurant and catering enterprise. It also covers his long-running role catering the Academy Awards Governors Ball.

Through archival footage and interviews with family members, colleagues, and industry figures he influenced including Mike Ovitz, Evan Funke, and Ruth Reichl, the film presents an overview of his career, personal history, and influence on the American dining scene.

== Production ==
In October 2019, it was announced David Gelb would direct and produce a documentary revolving around the life of chef Wolfgang Puck, with Disney+ set to distribute.

== Release ==
The film had its world premiere at the Tribeca Film Festival on June 12, 2021. It was released on June 25, 2021.

== Reception ==
=== Critical response ===
On Rotten Tomatoes, the documentary holds an approval rating of 86% based on 22 reviews, with an average rating of 6.3/10.

Jason Bailey of The New York Times found the film very interesting for depicting Wolfgang Puck's rise to fame and his impact on culinary arts, praised David Gelb's direction, claiming it gives an agreeable photography of the meals depicted across the documentary film, but declared that the movie focuses too much on Wolfgang's achievements and not enough on his personal life. John Serba of Decider found that the documentary manages to provide a genuine portrait of Wolfgang's life across his achievements and his regrets, claiming it gives a human touch on the businessman. Jennifer Green of Common Sense Media rated the film 3 out of 5 stars, complimented the educational value of the movie, stating it manages to depict some of the challenges encountered when being a chef and running a restaurant, and praised the positive messages and role models, claiming the film promotes self-assurance, integrity, and honesty. Odie Henderson of RogerEbert.com rated the film 2,5 out of 4 stars and praised Will Basanta's cinematography, stating it manages to provide a satisfying aesthetic through his shots, while claiming the film successfully depicts Wolfgang as a famous chef and self-made man, but found that the documentary film focuses too much on business and not enough on Wolfgang's personal life.
