= One More Victim =

1967 book by A. M. Rosenthal and Arthur Gelb

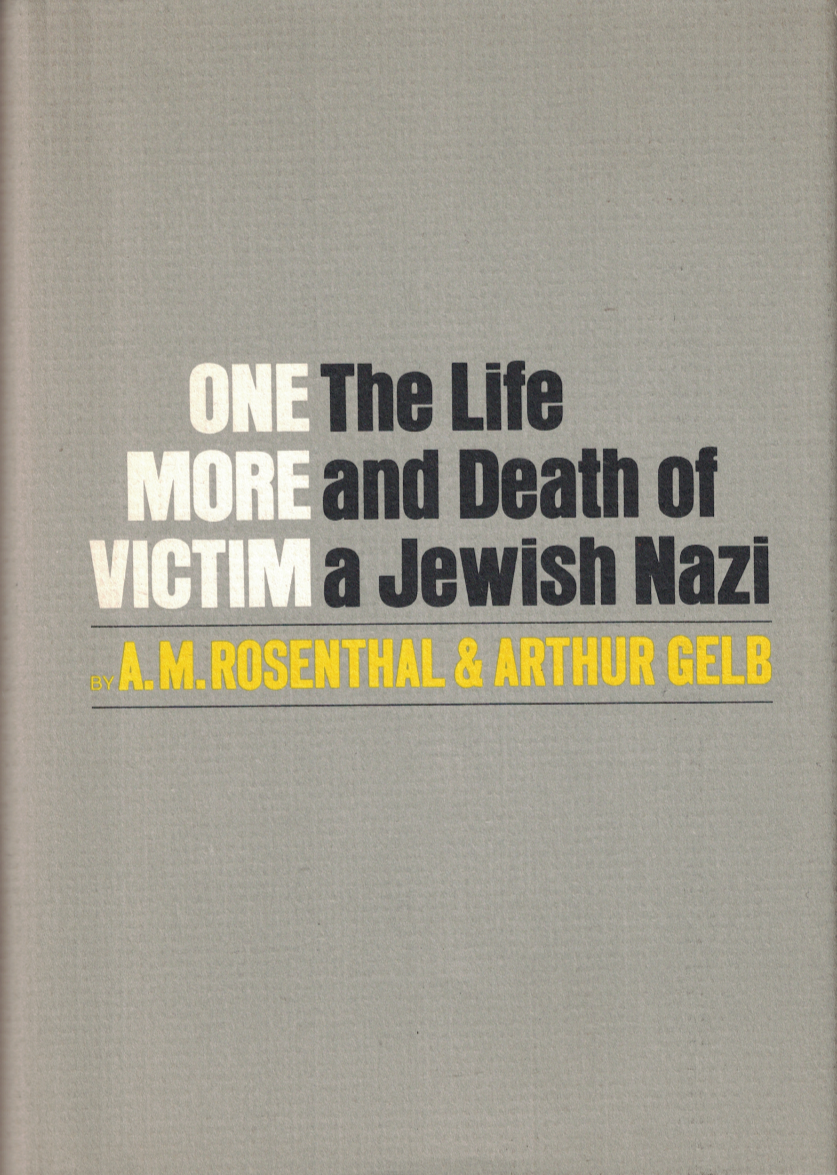
- Cover of the first hardcover edition
- Author: A. M. Rosenthal and Arthur Gelb
- Language: English
- Subject: Dan Burros
- Publisher: New American Library
- Publication date: 1967
- Publication place: United States
- Media type: Print (hardcover)
- Pages: 239
- OCLC: 1311571
- Dewey Decimal: 323.2
- LC Class: E743.5.B9 R6

One More Victim: The Life and Death of a Jewish Nazi (published in paperback with the subtitle The Life and Death of an American-Jewish Nazi) is a 1967 book by A. M. Rosenthal and Arthur Gelb. It is a biography of the neo-Nazi and Klansman Dan Burros, who killed himself when his Jewish heritage was revealed by The New York Times in October 1965. Both authors were journalists for the Times. In writing the book, they interviewed several of Burros's associates, including fellow Klansman Roy Frankhouser and Burros's girlfriend; Burros's parents refused all interviews.

It covers Burros's early life and family history and his involvement in hate groups, leading up to the revelation of his background and resulting suicide at the age of 28. It also covers and analyzes the American Nazi Party and its leader George Lincoln Rockwell to some extent, as well as the Jewish American experience. The authors argue that it is impossible to determine why exactly Burros had turned out the way he did, arguing that even Burros himself did not truly know.

One More Victim was published by New American Library in October 1967, and was reissued in paperback the next year through their Signet Books imprint. The book received mixed reviews, with praise for its journalism, research, and the amount of information provided, but a more polarized reception when it came to how well it answered the question of what led Burros to being a Jewish antisemite.

== Background and publication history ==
Dan Burros was an American neo-Nazi, a former member of the neo-Nazi American Nazi Party, and the New York City leader of the Ku Klux Klan. He rose to being one of the highest-ranking members of the American Nazi Party and a King Kleagle of the KKK. He was so extreme in his antisemitism that many other racists found the extremity of his views embarrassing.

Unbeknownst to his associates and the public, Burros was of Jewish descent and had been raised in a religiously Jewish family, even undergoing a bar mitzvah. On October 31, 1965, Burros's Jewish background was revealed in an article by New York Times journalist McCandlish Phillips. After Burros read the story, he killed himself the same day, at the age of 28. The story resulted in large amounts of media attention and great shock at the Times.

The authors of One More Victim, A. M. Rosenthal and Arthur Gelb, were both journalists for the Times; Rosenthal was the assistant managing editor of the paper while Gelb was the metropolitan editor. The authors were initially concerned that they were morally responsible for the suicide as editors of the paper. Phillips, an evangelical Christian, declined involvement in the book, citing scripture: "touch not the spoil".

The New American Library published the book in October 1967. Its first edition had 239 pages. It was published in paperback format the next year by their imprint Signet Books. The 1967 edition was subtitled The Life and Death of a Jewish Nazi, while the 1968 paperback edition was subtitled The Life and Death of an American-Jewish Nazi. For advertising, book received a major special promotion nationally, including through Jewish organizations.

== Contents ==
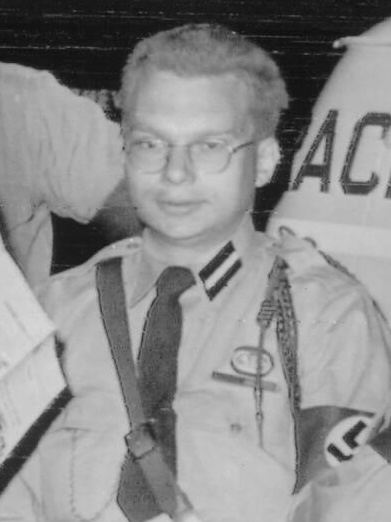
Dan Burros, pictured 1961

One More Victim begins with a summary of Burros's suicide and the immediate reaction to it; the shock of the apparent contradiction of a Jewish neo-Nazi resulted in large amounts of media attention. Rosenthal and Gelb then shift to a telling of his early life and upbringing in a Jewish family in Richmond Hill, Queens. As a child he was known for his religious devotion, but in his teenage years, he began to openly admire Nazi Germany and present himself as an ethnic German rather than a Jew.

In 1960, he joined George Lincoln Rockwell's American Nazi Party, where rose to being one of the highest-ranking members. The authors give a background on the American Nazi Party and Rockwell himself, arguing that both Rockwell and Burros are symptoms of the same political phenomena. After shifting through a variety of far-right associations, Burros joined the Ku Klux Klan in 1965 at the encouragement of his friend and fellow Klansman, Roy Frankhouser. The authors interviewed Frankhouser and Burros's girlfriend in the process of writing the book. Burros's parents refused all interviews.

Rosenthal and Gelb also discuss the Jewish American experience; the authors argue that "nothing can protect the Jew [...] from knowing that he was born into a tribe of victims". They use Jean-Paul Sartre's 1964 book Anti-Semite and Jew to analyze Burros and the profile of the antisemite, quoting him in his statement that "If a Jew is fascinated by Christians it is not because of their virtue, which he values little, but because they represent anonymity, humanity without race." The narrative culminates in the revelation that Burros was Jewish and the resulting suicide.

Rosenthal and Gelb argue that it is ultimately impossible to determine an answer for why Burros turned out the way he did, because "nobody knew it, including Daniel Burros himself". They argue that it provided him an opportunity to scapegoat his hatred: "Most of all, Dan attained the fortress of hatred for others those who had 'made him' what he did not want to be, the fortress from which men fight to deny the enemy within by laying about at the shadows without." They conclude that he had been destroyed even before he had killed himself, writing:

[...] Daniel Burros had ceased to live long before that Sunday in Reading. The fire of his hatred of himself and his origins had burned up his entire personality, without which no man can live. He had already chosen the slow suicide of self-denial and masquerade. Sunday in Reading simply relieved him of the agony.

== Reception ==
One More Victim received mixed reviews. It received praise for its research, documentation, and journalism, but the book's coverage of how Burros had come to be an antisemite received a more divided reception.

=== Research and writing style ===
Jeanne Lesem, writing for United Press International, praised it as a "perceptive and minutely detailed study" and "more than a biography of a misguided man—it is a thoughtful book that delves into the present meaning of Jewishness and anti-Semitism as reflected in the news day by day". Larry King said of the book that the "sordid, ironic, almost unbelievable story of this unusual individual is well documented" where "the facts become more unbelievable the more you read". A review in the Northwest Arkansas Times said the book "penetrates the masquerade" and praised it as a "compelling, carefully researched biography whose cumulative effect is blood-curdling" that was "vividly traced". Donald Stanley, for the San Francisco Examiner, called the story "bizarre" and noted the book's appeal as even beyond Burros, as a look at the "lunatic fringe" of the racist right.

Reviewer Eliot Fremont-Smith said it was a book of three focuses: the coverage of Burros himself, which he said was the least successful, and the American racist movement, which he called the portrayal of "vivid and fascinating" and "almost funny in its portrayal of the isolated, grubby, boyish ineffectualness of these men". The third theme he identified was the portrayal of the American Jewish experience, which he called the book's real heart. Kirkus Reviews complimented the author's "impressively thorough research job on Burros, his family, and the far-far-right organizations he belonged to"; they wrote that though there was "cheap psychologizing", there was "more virtue than might have been expected, given the sensational topic"; Lila Freilicher of Publishers Weekly said it was "straightforward and carefully researched".

Lois Town for The Bay City Times left a positive review, calling it "fascinating, frightening", and praised it for also giving "a penetrating insight into the bigotry and hate still encountered by Jewish Americans". Literary critic Robert Kirsch complimented the book as going beyond journalism and the original run of newspaper stories that had followed Burros, saying there were no "facile answers" and that it left many unanswered. Edward Grossman for the Chicago Tribune's Book World, more critical, wrote the book came at a time when, in his view, "too many books are being published in this troubled country"; he further criticized it as an example of the "Jewish exploitation industry" of books with Nazi themes. He also criticized the book for its tone and some factual statements about topics less related to Burros. Ultimately he said Burros "got the biographers he deserved". Jim Frankel for The Cleveland Press called it "slick and readable" as well as entertaining, though said some of its asides on Jewishness seemed pointless and found the lack of Phillips's involvement puzzling. Kirsch praised the writing style for not being outrageous, saying that if anything, they underplayed the narrative of Burros's life, with "lucid, direct, evocative" language no matter the content.

=== The question of what drove Burros ===
Reviews were divided about how well the book answered the question of why and how Burros had come to be an antisemite. The Northwest Arkansas Times argued the reader could find Burros's reason for joining the American Nazi Party in the book. Lesem believed the book's "inescapable conclusion" was that "Burros was a victim of anti-Semitism who sought protection by joining the enemy, only to destroy himself in the end", while Donald Stanley viewed it as indicating that Burros had developed "a complicated schizophrenic pattern in which Burros, trying to bury his identity in a masquerade of anti-semitism, came to hate this other self for its cowardice in fleeing from reality". Grossman said that despite all their information, the book did not really have any real idea of why Burros ended up the way he did except by alluding to antisemitism. Since Burros's parents refused to be interviewed, he acknowledged it was possible not much else could be written. While Rabbi Morris B. Margolies writing for The Kansas City Star praised its research, he argued it ultimately failed in answering this question, despite their efforts.

Kirkus wrote that it "[gave] no final answers to this sort of question", while Carol Eckberg of the Library Journal wrote that the authors had "attempted more than can be satisfactorily developed in this type of book", but recommended it as fascinating. Reviewer Nat Hentoff wrote an unfavorable review of the book for The New York Times Book Review. Hentoff had previously criticized Rosenthal's work and performance in The Village Voice, as well as the Times as a whole; Gelb and Rosenthal wondered if he had been given their book to review out of spite by an editor irritated with them. In his review, Hentoff acknowledged the work as a "competent piece of reporting", but said it lacked more direct insights from Burros himself, which were impossible. Hentoff praised the sections on the American Jewish experience and how they covered the American Nazi Party, and the ultimate lead up to his death. He concluded by arguing that he expected Burros to be "more complex, more confused, more riven, and perhaps more redeemable, than 'One More Victim' reveals".

Psychiatrist David Abrahamsen took issue with Hentoff's criticisms over the book lacking a proper explanation, saying it did have clear indications for what led him there. Abrahamsen theorized that the book's evidence indicated that Burros's antisemitism stemmed from feeling rejected by the Jewish community after his grandfather died and his Rabbi left him and possibly due to mental illness. Hentoff responded to Abrahamsen, saying that though there had been good biographical books written after the death of a subject, they were "based on much, much more information". Eight days later, reviewer Eliot Fremont-Smith wrote a positive review, also for the Times, though he too noted that it did not clearly answer the personal question of Burros's background. He argued the true story was perhaps unknowable.
