= Shirley Lord =

English-born American journalist (1932–2026)

- Born: Shirley Florence Stringer; August 28, 1932; London, England
- Died: June 10, 2026 (aged 93); New York City, U.S.
- Occupation: Journalist
- Spouse: A. M. Rosenthal (m. 1987; died. 2006)

Shirley Florence Stringer (August 28, 1932 – June 10, 2026) was an English-born American journalist. She served as beauty editor and director of the American monthly fashion magazine Vogue.

Lord died in Manhattan, New York on June 10, 2026, at the age of 93.
