= Bulletin (online newspaper) =

Swedish online newspaper

Bulletin is a Swedish online newspaper founded in 2020. The stated position of the editorial page is libertarian conservative, and the newspaper has frequently been characterized as politically right-wing. In 2021, Bulletin recruited Andrew Rosenthal, a former editor of The New York Times, as editor-in-chief, as well as Pelle Zachrisson from right-wing populist site Nyheter Idag as operative editor-in-chief.

Since its start in late 2020, the site has mainly drawn attention for its internal conflicts, which have been extensively covered in Swedish media. In the site's first three months, several of its founders, original financiers, and the first two editors-in-chief, the political editor, and the cultural editor all resigned in protest amid leaked emails and video conference calls, a charge of antisemitism, police reports, plagiarism, and legal confusion.

In October 2021, Bulletins CEO Jannik Svensson was criticized for employing convicted triple murderer Ricard Nilsson as a legal representative at the newspaper's annual meeting of shareholders.

In December 2021, owners Tino Sanandaji and Pontus Tholin each reported the other to the Swedish police for various types of fraud. Tholin stated that the paper should file for bankruptcy and that it was "a shadow of its former self".

In February 2022, Bulletin was declared bankrupt by Stockholm District Court due to unpaid debts.

== Editors-in-chef ==
- Paulina Neuding (December 2020 – February 2021)
- Ivar Arpi (February 2021 – March 2021)
- Andrew Rosenthal (April 2021 – )
