= David Gelb =

American filmmaker

- Born: October 16, 1983 (age 43); Manhattan, New York City, New York, U.S.
- Occupations: Film director, screenwriter
- Spouse: Christine D'Souza (m. 2016)
- Parent(s): Peter Gelb; Donna Daniels
- Relatives: Arthur Gelb (grandfather); Barbara Gelb (grandmother)

David Gelb (born October 16, 1983) is an American director of film and television.

He is most known for his documentary work on the subject of food and cuisine, including the 2011 film Jiro Dreams of Sushi, the Netflix series Chef's Table and Street Food, and the 2021 film Wolfgang.

== Life and career ==
Gelb was born in Manhattan, New York City. His father is Peter Gelb, the general manager of the Metropolitan Opera; his paternal grandfather was Arthur Gelb, a former managing editor of The New York Times.

Gelb attended the Columbia Grammar & Preparatory School and graduated from the University of Southern California.

In 2016, he married Christine D'Souza Gelb, the principal of the A24-backed production and talent management firm, 2AM.

David Gelb released Jiro Dreams of Sushi in 2012. He created a food documentary series for Netflix called Chef's Table, which he considers a follow-up to Jiro Dreams of Sushi.

Gelb's 2015 documentary, A Faster Horse, examines the development of the 2015 Ford Mustang, a film timed to coincide with the 50th anniversary of the first Mustang.

Gelb, Brian McGinn and Jason Sterman produced Marvel's 616, a documentary series about the impact of Marvel Comics on culture.

== Filmography ==
Short film

- Lethargy (2002)

Feature film

- The Lazarus Effect (2015)
- The Menu (2022, second unit)

Documentary film

- Jiro Dreams of Sushi (2011)
- A Faster Horse (2015)
- Wolfgang (2021)
- A Spark Story (2021)
- Poached (2022)

Documentary series

- Chef's Table (2015)
- Street Food (2019)
- Marvel's 616 (2020) (episode "Japanese Spider-Man")

== Awards ==
Year	Title	Award	Work
2015	Best Episodic Series	International Documentary Association	Chef's Table
