= VAN Magazine =

Classical music magazine

VAN
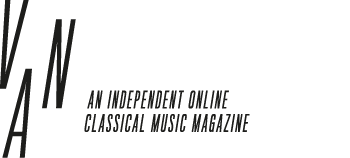
- VAN Magazine Logo
- Editor in Chief: Hartmut Welscher
- Categories: Classical music
- Frequency: Weekly
- Publisher: VAN Verlag GmbH
- Founder: Ingmar Bornholz; Hartmut Welscher
- First issue: 2016
- Country: Germany; United States
- Based in: Berlin
- Language: English; German
- Website: van-magazine.com; van-magazin.de

VAN is an online independent magazine devoted to classical music. Published weekly in German and English, it launched in January 2016, styling itself as "a fanzine for music lovers, music professionals and followers of the arts." Its name comes from the surname of Ludwig van Beethoven.

Unlike many other classical music publications, such as Gramophone, Opera News, and Das Opernglas, VAN caters to a younger audience of classical music fans and professionals. Its focus on news and stories that center on non-mainstream voices, perspectives, and stories within classical music has earned it comparisons to Pitchfork.

VAN first received international attention in February, 2016, when its interview with Austrian composer Georg Friedrich Haas was written about in The New York Times. It was the first time that Haas had, in his words, "come out" as the dominant in a BDSM relationship with his wife. The Haas interview was also referenced in a Quartz article on BDSM and creativity. Later that year, New Yorker music critic Alex Ross wrote that the magazine had "rapidly established itself as a venue for unfettered music writing."

Other VAN interviews and reported pieces have informed pieces in the New York Times, The Guardian, The Washington Post, Forbes, the New Yorker, the Los Angeles Times, the Boston Globe, Slate, and Pitchfork. Several pieces written for VAN are listed as sources in the textbook Classical Concert Studies: A Companion to Contemporary Research and Performance. The popular literary website Longreads cited two of the magazine's essays as explorations that allow readers to "hear the music, and think of [classical music's] culture, differently, too."

In 2018, VAN partnered with music publisher Ricordi for the Ricordilab program for emerging composers, a three-year mentorship and career program. In 2020, VAN announced the inaugural Berlin Prize for Young Artists, a competition for early-career musicians that judged based on both artistic vision/curation and performing talent and technique. The magazine would curate the prize in partnership with Swiss bank Julius Baer. A documentary featuring five of the six finalists, filmed at the Elbphilharmonie in Hamburg, was released in the summer of 2020.

== Notable stories and contributors ==
VAN has published breaking news around topics including alleged professional and sexual misconduct at the Juilliard School of Music, the San Francisco Conservatory of Music, Badisches Staatstheater in Karlsruhe, Germany and the University of Texas at Austin's Butler School of Music, as well as allegations of professional misconduct by conductor and music director Daniel Barenboim. It has also reported on the ongoing allegations of misconduct against James Levine both in the US and Germany. It has published interviews with Teju Cole, Laurie Anderson, Barbara Hannigan, Mahan Esfahani, András Schiff, Angela Gheorghiu, Davóne Tines, Claire Chase, Anna Thorvaldsdottir, Peter Eötvös, and Elina Garanca.

VAN has published essays and features written by Haas, cellist Matt Haimovitz, author and former Leonard Bernstein assistant Craig Urquhart, ABC News's Alexandra Svokos, The Paris Review's Helena de Groot, Kenji Fujishima, critic and librettist Olivia Giovetti, musicologist and Jeopardy! contestant Linda Shaver-Gleason, and Belarusian conductor Vitali Alekseenok.

=== Daniel Barenboim reporting ===
VAN's style of reporting is characterized by stories that go beyond the traditional purview of legacy classical music publications. In 2019, VAN broke news of conductor and music director Daniel Barenboim's alleged professional misconduct, characterized across interviews with past and current employees as "authoritarian, mercurial, and frightening" behavior. Allegations of his misconduct included two separate incidents where he purportedly "grabbed and [shook] members of his staff in anger." The Columbia Journalism Review called the report "groundbreaking," and linked VAN to a vanguard of classical music journalism that expanded focus from performance and technique to issues of representation, interpersonal and global politics, and workplace culture.

=== Mahan Esfahani controversy ===
In 2017, VAN published an interview with Iranian-American harpsichordist Mahan Esfahani wherein he said that he felt the harpsichord was becoming a tool of nationalism. Of one competition in Bruges, Esfahani said: "If you did not adhere to a certain strain of performance style associated with the historical performance movement, criticism was cast in specifically nationalistic terms." This prompted a rebuttal from fellow harpsichordist Andreas Staier (also published in VAN) that led to a public row covered particularly in the UK press. Writing for The Spectator, critic Damian Thompson called the behavior "potentially damaging [for Esfahani's] international career." Writer Norman Lebrecht responded in defense of Esfahani.

=== Daniel Hope incident ===
In the winter of 2017–2018, composer, curator, and VAN contributor Arno Lücker published a video (on his own blog) featuring violinist Daniel Hope set to a different track of a badly-played violin, an example of "shred" videos (a popular meme at the time that featured well-known musicians re-dubbed with deliberately bad performances). Hope's lawyers sent a cease-and-desist which resulted in the video being removed. Lücker reported additional legal threats from Hope, as well as professional repercussions that included his contract with the Berliner Konzerthaus (where he freelanced as a moderator and where Hope also worked as a curator) being terminated after Hope sent the video to the hall's artistic director. VAN's report of the situation was described by the New Yorker as "bizarre [and] chilling," and was additionally referenced in the incident's international coverage.
