= Street Food (TV series) =

American docu-series on Netflix

- Genre: Documentary
- Created by: David Gelb; Brian McGinn
- Directed by: Various
- Country of origin: United States
- Original language: English
- No. of seasons: 3
- No. of episodes: 21

Production
- Running time: 30–34 min.
- Production companies: Boardwalk Pictures; Supper Club

Original release
- Network: Netflix
- Release: April 26, 2019 – present

Street Food is an American documentary that premiered on Netflix on April 26, 2019, created by David Gelb and Brian McGinn, exploring street food around the world. Archival footage is combined with face-to-face interviews and follows street food chefs and their history, which is intertwined with the big picture of how influential street food is in their native country.

== Episodes ==
Volume	Episodes	Originally released
1	9	April 26, 2019
2	6	July 21, 2020
3	6	July 26, 2022

=== Volume 1: Asia (2019) ===
No. overall	No. in season	Title	Original release date
1	1	"Bangkok, Thailand"	April 26, 2019
Hear the inspirational story of street food chef Jay Fai, who puts a spin on tom yum soup and boasts a Michelin star for her crab omelets.
2	2	"Osaka, Japan"	April 26, 2019
Toyo is the humorous, fiery chef of a beloved izakaya in Osaka, the epicure's city known for popularizing street favorites from okonomiyaki to takoyaki.
3	3	"Delhi, India"	April 26, 2019
From the crispy savory chaat to the spiced chole bhature, these Delhi street flavors are deeply connected to family stories and political history.
4	4	"Yogyakarta, Indonesia"	April 26, 2019
Among the sidewalk delicacies from gudeg to cassava noodles, the jajan pasar is the oldest. And one woman's recipe offers a window into the past.
5	5	"Chiayi, Taiwan"	April 26, 2019
Tofu pudding. Fish head soup. Goat stew. The family-owned street stalls of Chiayi are bastions of Taiwan's culinary traditions.
6	6	"Seoul, South Korea"	April 26, 2019
The food stalls at Gwangjang Market showcase some of South Korea's beloved old favorites, from soy-marinated crabs to knife-cut noodles.
7	7	"Ho Chi Minh City, Vietnam"	April 26, 2019
Snail and broken rice are staples of Ho Chi Minh City's outdoorsy street food culture, which has been shaped by both history and family memory.
8	8	"Singapore"	April 26, 2019
Putu piring, wonton noodles, chili crab, chicken rice. Hawkers selling some of Singapore's favorite dishes offer a glimpse into their lives.
9	9	"Cebu, Philippines"	April 26, 2019
Benefitting from the rich biodiversity of the land and sea, Florencio Escabas makes a reef eel soup held dear by the island city's many residents.

=== Volume 2: Latin America (2020) ===
No. overall	No. in season	Title	Original release date
10	1	"Buenos Aires, Argentina"	July 21, 2020
Argentines are passionate about street food, be it choripáns or fugazzeta, but Pato Rodriguez's cheesy tortilla has even acclaimed chefs raving.
11	2	"Salvador, Brazil"	July 21, 2020
Hearty feijoada. Spicy moqueca. Beachside pirão. Bahia's food is awash with both African and Portuguese influences — and lots and lots of dendê oil.
12	3	"Oaxaca, Mexico"	July 21, 2020
Toasted tlayudas and vinegary piedrazos embody the rich biodiversity and profound flavors of Oaxaca. Meet Doña Vale, who makes peerless memelas.
13	4	"Lima, Peru"	July 21, 2020
Joyfully diverse yet singular in flavor, Lima's food culture lives for honeyed picarones, savory anticuchos and one chef's Nikkei-inspired ceviche.
14	5	"Bogota, Colombia"	July 21, 2020
Luz Dary and the women at La Perseverancia food market reinvent classic Colombian dishes such as arepas and ajiaco, reinvigorating local cuisine.
15	6	"La Paz, Bolivia"	July 21, 2020
Rellenos queen Doña Emi and other cholitas fight to be seen while upholding traditional bites like anise-flavored buñuelos and fiery chola sandwiches.

=== Volume 3: USA (2022) ===
No. overall	No. in season	Title	Original release date
16	1	"Los Angeles, California"	July 26, 2022
Carnitas simmered with love, skewers kissed by fire, hot dogs that make the score — some of the best eats in LA can be found in its many communities.
17	2	"Portland, Oregon"	July 26, 2022
Portland's freethinking food scene fosters barbecue brisket tacos, loaded mac and cheese — and Thuy Pham's heartfelt Vietnamese vegan pork belly.
18	3	"New York, New York"	July 26, 2022
Always on the go, the Big Apple fuels its hustle with soul-stirring shrimp and grits, crisp slices, spicy halal chicken and rice, and snappy dogs.
19	4	"New Orleans, Louisiana"	July 26, 2022
Amid a party city's mix of po'boys, snoballs and crawfish, Ms. Linda Green's beloved yakamein bubbles with inspiration, even in the face of tragedy.
20	5	"Oahu, Hawaii"	July 26, 2022
Sparkling fresh poke. Succulent kalua pig. Tempting, tender kalbi. For a real taste of Hawaii, take a bite at its lunch trucks and holes-in-the-wall.
21	6	"Miami, Florida"	July 26, 2022
Souse — that bold, vinegary broth boosted with meat and potatoes — saved Souseman Larry's life in a town built on fritas, pikliz and Cuban sandwiches.

== Release ==
The first season was released on April 26, 2019, on Netflix; the second season on July 21, 2020; the third season on July 26, 2022.

== Reception ==
Review aggregator Rotten Tomatoes reported an approval rating of 100% based on 8 reviews, with an average rating of 8/10 for the first volume. For the second volume, review aggregator Rotten Tomatoes reported an approval rating of 83% based on 6 reviews, with an average rating of 6.5/10.

== See also ==
- List of cuisines
- List of street foods
