= Tessitura (software) =

Ticketing and fundraising software for nonprofit organizations

- Original author: Metropolitan Opera
- Developer: Tessitura Network
- Initial release: 2000
- Stable release: 16.0.2 / August 1, 2022
- Written in: Microsoft SQL Server, .NET, PowerBuilder, Angular (web framework)
- Operating system: Windows
- Available in: English
- License: Proprietary
- Website: tessitura.com

Tessitura is a software package for nonprofit arts and culture organizations, marketed as "arts enterprise software." Tessitura was initially developed by the Metropolitan Opera for its internal use, and integrates ticketing, fundraising, and customer relationship management functions. Since 2001, Tessitura has been developed and maintained by the nonprofit company Tessitura Network, which was founded by 7 major arts organizations in the United States.

Tessitura's business model is unique, as it is developed by a nonprofit organization and marketed solely to the nonprofit sector. The software's integration of ticketing, marketing, fundraising, and CRM is unique among its competitors, which include major CRM and ticketing providers. Users of Tessitura include opera companies, orchestras, theatres, museums, aquariums, and zoos.

== Features ==
Tessitura integrates multiple functions undertaken by large nonprofit organizations in the field of arts and culture. Performing arts organizations were the first users of Tessitura, as it was developed by the Metropolitan Opera, and its feature set reflects the unique needs of nonprofit performing arts organizations. The unique funding model of these organizations combines donations from donors of all sizes, individual ticket sales, and subscription tickets. Tessitura supports these needs with a customer relationship management solution, which integrates ticketing, fundraising, and subscription ticket sales.

== Business model ==
Tessitura Network is a nonprofit organization, registered as a 501(c)(3) organization. Users of the Tessitura software, themselves nonprofits, are members of the organization and direct its activities. The "Tessitura" trademark is owned by a subsidiary of the Metropolitan Opera.

Tessitura's business model is also unique among ticketing service providers due to its pricing structure. Tessitura sells its software with a lifetime license, and does not charge yearly or per-ticket fees. Pricing information is not publicly available, but a 2008 survey of Tessitura users indicated that pricing is linked to an organization's annual revenue. The 2008 survey estimated that startup costs for the software ranged from US$50,000 to $500,000, or about 3-5% of the organization's annual operating budget.

== History ==
In the mid-1990s, the Metropolitan Opera sought a new solution for its marketing, fundraising, and ticket sales to replace its existing collection of disparate systems. The search for a new ticketing system was part of a broader program of reorganization and technical improvement, begun in 1990 by general manager Joseph Volpe. The Met researched existing CRM and ticketing systems, and investigated how to integrate them together to meet its needs, but concluded that no commercial product would be appropriate.

Development of the system took four years, and cost over $5 million, a significant sum for even an organization the size of the Met. The system launched in phases from 1998 to 1999, and quickly drew attention from other major arts organizations. By early 2000, the Met had licensed Tessitura to the Kennedy Center, the San Francisco Symphony, and the Santa Fe Opera.

The three initial licensees of Tessitura collaborated with four other major arts and culture organizations to launch the Tessitura Network in 2001. Tessitura Network, a nonprofit company, was formed to operate and further develop the Tessitura software and to ensure that it retained its focus on the nonprofit sector.

The Royal Opera House, a Tessitura customer since 2006, presented a major issue with the Tessitura software's architecture in 2011. With the growing popularity of web ticket sales, which represented 60-90% of the ROH's business in 2013, its infrastructure was under stress during peak periods. Demand increased by a factor of 30 during certain peak periods, and customers faced system crashes and hours-long waits to purchase tickets. This prompted the ROH to move its Tessitura instance into the cloud in 2012. The Royal Opera House used scalable services from Amazon Web Services to adapt to demand, which it found were more cost-effective than expanding its internal infrastructure. Tessitura began offering its own cloud-hosted version of its software in 2021, using services from Amazon Web Services in collaboration with Rackspace Technology.

== Users ==
The Metropolitan Opera developed Tessitura. Its initial licensees were the Kennedy Center, the San Francisco Symphony, the Santa Fe Opera, the Seattle Opera, the New York City Center, and the Lyric Opera of Chicago. Since the software's launch, Tessitura has targeted additional markets, including museums and zoos, which operate on a similar model of ticket sales and donations.

Tessitura had 150 licensees in 4 countries in 2007. As of 2024, it has over 750 licensees in 10 countries.
