= Arthur Gelb =

American journalist and editor

- Born: February 3, 1924; New York City, U.S.
- Died: May 20, 2014 (aged 90); New York City, U.S.
- Education: New York University
- Occupations: Author, editor
- Years active: 1944–1989
- Employer: The New York Times
- Spouse: Barbara Gelb (until his death 2014)
- Children: Peter
- Relatives: David Gelb (grandson)

Arthur Gelb (February 3, 1924 – May 20, 2014) was an American editor, author and executive and was the managing editor of The New York Times from 1986 to 1989.

== Early life and education ==
Gelb was born to two Jewish immigrants from what was then Czechoslovakia and now Ukraine, in the back of his parents dress shop in East Harlem. His family later moved to the Bronx where he attended DeWitt Clinton High School. He attempted to join the military during World War II but was rejected due to having poor vision.

Gelb attended City College of New York but dropped out during his junior year in 1944. In 1946, Gelb graduated from New York University.

== Career ==
Gelb began working the night shift at The Times as a copy boy in 1944. He ascended through the ranks, holding several titles in many different departments. His biggest impacts were while working in the drama department. He enjoyed the plays of Eugene O'Neill so much that he wrote a biography of the playwright (O'Neill: Life with Monte Cristo, 1974, ISBN 9780060114879) with his wife Barbara. He supported the creation of the New York Shakespeare Festival by editorializing Joseph Papp's productions. He edited a number of works such as Great Lives of the Twentieth Century (ISBN 978-0812916256). Gelb retired from The Times in 1989 as managing editor. City Room (ISBN 9780399150753), a memoir of his life and career at The Times, was published in 2003.

After retiring from The Times, Gelb became president of The New York Times Company Foundation, which operated until 2009, and director of The New York Times College Scholarship Program.

Gelb received an honorary Doctorate of Humane Letters from the City College of New York in 1997.

== Personal life ==
Gelb and his family lived in New York City. Arthur and Barbara Gelb were the parents of Peter Gelb, general manager of the Metropolitan Opera in New York City.

== Death ==
Gelb died on May 20, 2014, at his home in Manhattan, New York, of complications of a stroke. He was 90.

== Bibliography ==
- One More Victim: The Life and Death of a Jewish Nazi. New York: The New American Library, 1967. Rosenthal, A.M. & Gelb, Arthur.
- O'Neill: Life with Monte Cristo, 1974, ISBN 9780060114879
- Great Lives of the Twentieth Century, ISBN 978-0812916256, editor
