= A. M. Rosenthal =

American journalist (1922–2006)

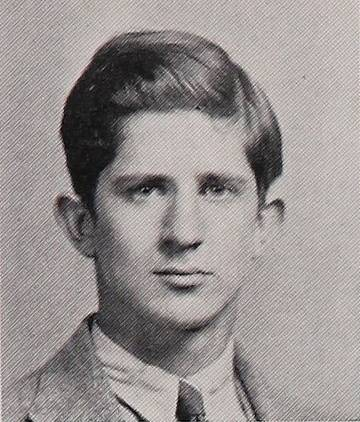
- Rosenthal in 1939
- Born: May 2, 1922; Sault Ste. Marie, Ontario, Canada
- Died: May 10, 2006 (aged 84); Manhattan, New York, U.S.
- Education: City College of New York; DeWitt Clinton High School
- Occupations: Journalist; editor
- Spouse: Ann Marie Burke (m. 1949; div. 1986) Shirley Lord (m. 1987)
- Children: 3, including Andrew
- Writing career
- Notable awards: Pulitzer Prize for International Reporting (1960); Presidential Medal of Freedom (2002)

Abraham Michael "Abe" Rosenthal (May 2, 1922 – May 10, 2006) was a Canadian-born American journalist who served as The New York Times executive editor from 1977 to 1986. Previously he was the newspaper's metropolitan editor and managing editor. Following his tenure as executive editor, he became a columnist (1987–1999). Later, he had a column for the New York Daily News (1999–2004).

He joined the newspaper in 1943 and remained at the Times for 56 years, to 1999. Rosenthal won a Pulitzer Prize in 1960 for international reporting. As an editor at the newspaper, Rosenthal oversaw the coverage of numerous major news stories including the escalation of the United States military's involvement in the Vietnam War (1961–1975), the New York Times scoop of the Pentagon Papers (1971), and events that were part of the Watergate scandal (1972–1974). Rosenthal was instrumental in the paper's coverage of the 1964 Kitty Genovese murder case, which established the concept of the "bystander effect", but later came to be regarded as flawed and not credible.

Together with Catherine A. Fitzpatrick, he was the first Westerner to visit a Soviet Gulag camp in 1988. His son, Andrew Rosenthal, was The New York Times editorial page editor from 2007 to 2016. His eldest son, Jonathan Rosenthal, is a retired physician who specialized in infectious diseases. His middle son, Daniel, is a retired financial executive who now owns a horse farm.

== Early years ==
Rosenthal was born on May 2, 1922, in Sault Ste. Marie, Ontario, Canada, to a Jewish family. His father, Harry Shipiatsky, was a farmer who immigrated to Canada from Poland in the 1890s and changed his name to Rosenthal. He also worked as a fur trapper and trader around Hudson Bay, where he met and married Sarah Dickstein.

The youngest of six children, he was still a child when his family moved to the Bronx, New York, where Rosenthal's father found work as a house painter. During the 1930s, though, tragedy hit the family when Rosenthal's father died in a job accident and four of his siblings died from various causes.

According to his son, Andrew, he was a member of the Communist Party youth league briefly as a teenager in the late 1930s.

Rosenthal developed the bone-marrow disease osteomyelitis, causing him extreme pain and forcing him to drop out of DeWitt Clinton High School. After several operations at the Mayo Clinic, Rosenthal recovered enough to finish public schools in New York City and attend the City College of New York. At City College, Rosenthal wrote for the student newspaper, The Campus, and in 1943, while still a student, became the campus correspondent for The New York Times. In February 1944, he became a staff reporter there.

== International reporting and Pulitzer Prize ==
Rosenthal was a foreign correspondent for The New York Times for much of the 1950s and early 1960s. In 1954, he was assigned to New Delhi and reported from across South Asia. His writings from there were honored by the Overseas Press Club and Columbia University. In 1958, The New York Times transferred him to Warsaw, where he reported on Poland and Eastern Europe. In 1959, Rosenthal was expelled from Poland after writing that the Polish leader, Władysław Gomułka, was "moody and irascible" and had been "let down—by intellectuals and economists he never had any sympathy for anyway, by workers he accuses of squeezing overtime out of a normal day's work, by suspicious peasants who turn their backs on the government's plans, orders and pleas."

Rosenthal's expulsion order stated that the reporter had "written very deeply and in detail about the internal situation, party and leadership matters. The Polish government cannot tolerate such probing reporting." For his reporting from Eastern Europe, Rosenthal won a Pulitzer Prize in 1960 for international reporting.

== Kitty Genovese murder case ==
As metropolitan editor of The New York Times, Rosenthal was instrumental in pushing an inaccurate account of the murder of Kitty Genovese on March 13, 1964. Rosenthal heard about the case over lunch with New York City Police Commissioner Michael J. Murphy. He assigned the story to reporter Martin Gansberg, who wrote an article published March 27, 1964, titled "37 Who Saw Murder Didn't Call the Police." (The article actually claimed there were 38 witnesses, but an error reduced the number by one in the headline.) The story was a sensation, prompting inquiries into what became known as the bystander effect or "Genovese syndrome." Rosenthal wrote a book on the subject, and the incident became a common case study in American and British introductory psychology textbooks.

Immediately after the story broke, WNBC police reporter Danny Meehan discovered many inconsistencies in the article. Meehan asked The New York Times reporter Martin Gansberg why his article failed to reveal that witnesses did not feel that a murder was happening. Gansberg replied, "It would have ruined the story." Not wishing to jeopardize his career by attacking powerful The New York Times editor Abe Rosenthal, Meehan kept his findings secret and passed his notes to fellow WNBC reporter Gabe Pressman. Later, Pressman taught a journalism course in which some of his students called Rosenthal and confronted him with the evidence. Rosenthal was irate that his editorial decisions were being questioned by journalism students and angrily berated Pressman in a phone call.

Decades later, researchers confirmed the serious flaws in The New York Times article. Only a dozen people saw or heard the attack, and none of them saw the entire incident. The newspaper admitted in 2016 that the witnesses did not know that a murder was taking place, assuming that two lovers or drunks were quarreling. Two people called the police, and one person went outside to Genovese and held her in her arms as she died.

== Editor ==
In 1969, Rosenthal became managing editor of The New York Times with overall command of the paper's news operations. During the 1970s, he directed coverage of a number of important news stories, including the Vietnam War and the Watergate scandal.

Rosenthal played a decisive role in the paper's decision to publish the Pentagon Papers in 1971. Because this secret government history of the Vietnam War was classified information, publication of the papers could have led to charges of treason, lawsuits, or even jail time for paper staff. Rosenthal pushed for publishing the papers (along with New York Times reporter Neil Sheehan and publisher Arthur Ochs Sulzberger). The Nixon administration sued to stop publication, resulting in a US Supreme Court decision, upholding the right of the press to publish items without "prior restraint" on the part of the government.

Columnist Wesley Pruden said about Rosenthal's editorial policy:

Like all good editors, Abe was both loved and loathed, the former by those who met his standards, the latter mostly by those who couldn't keep the pace he set as City Editor, Managing Editor and finally Executive Editor. He brooked no challenges to his authority. He once told a reporter who demanded to exercise his rights by marching in a street demonstration he was assigned to cover: "OK, the rule is, you can [make love to] an elephant if you want to, but if you do you can't cover the circus." We call that "the Rosenthal rule."

== Political views ==
Rosenthal supported the 2003 invasion of Iraq and suggested that the United States should give Afghanistan, Iraq, Iran, Libya, Syria, and Sudan an ultimatum and order the countries to deliver documents and information related to weapons of mass destruction and terrorist organizations. Otherwise, "in the three days the terrorists were considering the American ultimatum, the residents of the countries would be urged 24 hours a day by the U.S. to flee the capital and major cities, because they would be bombed to the ground beginning the fourth day."

Rosenthal was also criticized for being extremely homophobic, with his views affecting how the New York Times covered issues regarding gay people including the early years of the AIDS epidemic. According to former Times journalist Charles Kaiser, "Everyone below Rosenthal (at the New York Times) spent all of their time trying to figure out what to do to cater to his prejudices. One of these widely perceived prejudices was Abe’s homophobia. So editors throughout the paper would keep stories concerning gays out of the paper." One result of this is that the Times "initially 'ignored' the AIDS epidemic."

== Later career ==
Rosenthal had a weekly column at the New York Daily News following his run as a columnist at the Times until 2004.

== Death ==
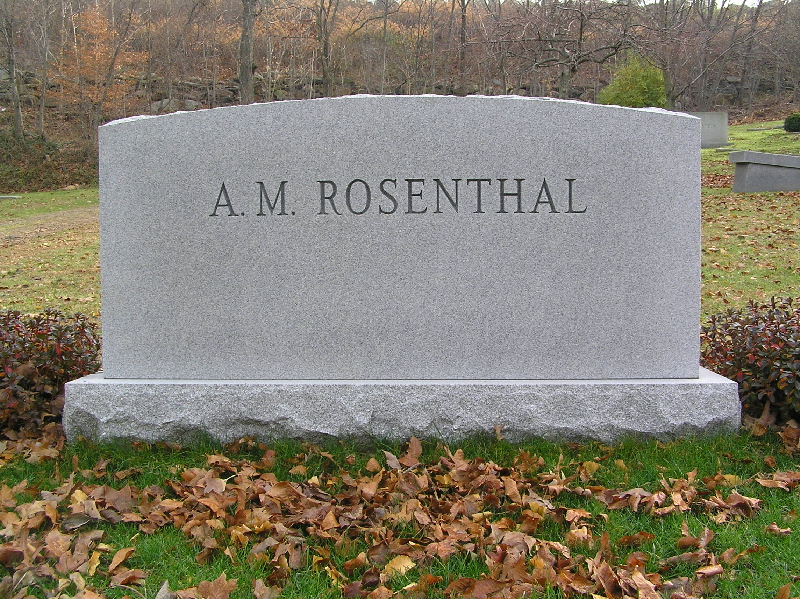
The headstone of A.M. Rosenthal in Westchester Hills Cemetery

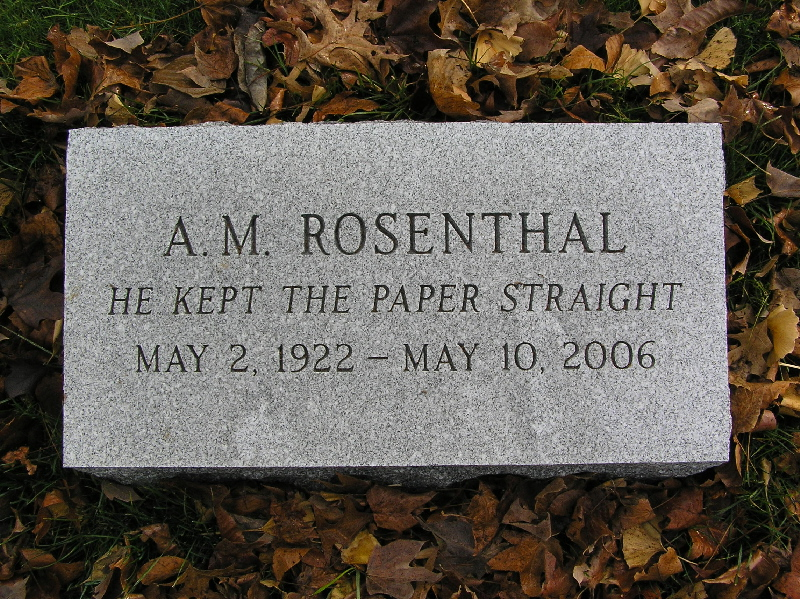
The epitaph of Rosenthal

Rosenthal died in Manhattan on May 10, 2006, eight days after his 84th birthday. He is interred in Westchester Hills Cemetery in Hastings-on-Hudson, New York. His epitaph inscribed on his grave marker ("He kept the paper straight") was chosen to memorialize his efforts at The New York Times to deliver unbiased news.

== Titles at The New York Times ==
- 1943-1945—General assignment reporter: New York.
- 1945-1954—Reporter: United Nations.
- 1954-1967—Foreign correspondent: India, Pakistan, Nepal, Afghanistan, Ceylon, New Guinea, Vietnam, Switzerland, Poland, Africa and Japan.
- 1963-1967—Metropolitan editor.
- 1967-1968—Assistant managing editor.
- 1968-1969—Associate managing editor.
- 1970-1977—Managing editor.
- 1977-January 1, 1988—Executive editor.
- 1988-1999—Columnist.

== Awards and honors ==
- Pulitzer Prize for International Reporting (1960)
- The Elijah Parish Lovejoy Award
- An honorary Doctor of Laws degree from Colby College
- The Light of Truth Award (1994)
- The Guardian of Zion Award (1999)
- The Presidential Medal of Freedom (2002)

== Bibliography ==
- One More Victim: The Life and Death of a Jewish Nazi. New York: The New American Library, 1967. Rosenthal, A.M. & Gelb, Arthur.
- Thirty-Eight Witnesses: The Kitty Genovese Case. University of California Press. ISBN 0-520-21527-3.
