= Birthday Offering =

- Choreographer: Frederick Ashton
- Music: Alexander Glazunov, arranged by Robert Irving
- Premiere: 5 May 1956; Royal Opera House, London
- Original ballet company: Sadler's Wells Ballet

Birthday Offering is a pièce d'occasion in one scene choreographed by Frederick Ashton to music by Alexander Glazunov, arranged by Robert Irving. The ballet was created in 1956, to celebrate the Royal Ballet's 25th anniversary. The first performance took place on 5 May 1956 at the Royal Opera House, London.

== Original cast ==
- Margot Fonteyn
- Beryl Grey
- Violetta Elvin
- Nadia Nerina
- Rowena Jackson
- Svetlana Beriosova
- Elaine Fifield
- Michael Somes
- Alexander Grant
- Brian Shaw
- Philip Chatfield
- David Blair
- Desmond Doyle
- Bryan Ashbridge

== Order of numbers ==
In a sumptuous setting, seven couples make a grand entrance, then the women perform a series of seven solo variations. The men dance a bravura mazurka, the principal couple performs an elegant pas de deux, and the ballet ends with a final waltz for the entire ensemble.

1. Overture: "L'Eté" from The Seasons, Op. 67
2. Valse de concert No. 1, Op. 47
3. Pas d'action from Scènes de ballet, Op. 52, and Coda from Ruses d'amour, Op. 61
4. 1st variation: "Marionettes" from Scènes de ballet
5. 2nd variation: "La Givre" from The Seasons
6. 3rd variation: "La Glace" from The Seasons
7. 4th variation: "La Grêle" from The Seasons
8. 5th variation: "La Neige" from The Seasons
9. 6th variation: "L'Eté" from The Seasons
10. 7th variation: from Ruses d'amour
11. Mazurka, Op. 25 No. 3, (orchestrated by Robert Irving)
12. Pas de deux; "Grand pas des fiancées" from Ruses d'amour
13. Finale: Valse de concert No. 1, reprise
