= Met Gala (disambiguation) =

Met Gala is the annual haute couture fundraising festival held for the benefit of the Metropolitan Museum of Art's Costume Institute in Manhattan.

Met Gala may also refer to:

- Met Gala (album), or the title track, by Sarah Toscano, 2025
- Met Gala (opera), a formal event hosted by the Metropolitan Opera
- "Met Gala", 2017 song by Gucci Mane from Droptopwop
- "Met Gala", 2020 song by Gunna from Wunna
