= Met Radio =

Met Radio may refer to:

- CJTM, a campus radio station based at Toronto Metropolitan University
- Met Radio, the online campus radio station of Metropolitan State University of Denver
- Metropolitan Opera Radio, radio operations associated with the New York opera company
