= Mary Heath =

Mary Heath may refer to:

- Mary, Lady Heath (1896–1939), Irish aviator
- Mary Heath (politician), member of the New Hampshire House of Representatives
- Mary Jo Heath (born 1954), American radio music host
