= William Berger =

William Berger may refer to:

- William Thomas Berger (1815–1899), English manufacturer and missionary director
- William Berger (actor) (1928–1993), Austrian-American actor
- William Berger (author) (born 1961), American writer on music and radio host
