= Metropolitan Opera Radio =

Metropolitan Opera Radio may refer to:

- Metropolitan Opera radio broadcasts, weekly Saturday live broadcasts from New York City's Metropolitan Opera
- Metropolitan Opera Radio (Sirius XM), a channel on Sirius XM satellite radio
