= Mary Jo Heath =

American radio announcer

Mary Jo Heath (born December 11, 1954) is an American radio music host, associated with the Metropolitan Opera since 2006.

Born in Iowa City, Heath graduated from Norman High School in Norman, Oklahoma, in 1972. She then studied music at the University of Oklahoma and completed a PhD in music theory at the Eastman School of Music in Rochester, New York. While at Eastman, she studied voice briefly with fellow student Renée Fleming, with whom she forged a lifelong friendship.

After working in the classical music world in various capacities, including a manager at Philips Classics Records, she became senior radio producer at the Metropolitan Opera in 2006. She became radio host in 2015 following the death of Margaret Juntwait. She is the fourth regular host of the broadcasts since they began in 1931.

During the Met opera season Heath was host for two to three live broadcasts per week on Metropolitan Opera Radio on Sirius with commentator William Berger, as well as the Saturday matinee international Metropolitan Opera radio broadcasts, where her commentator was Ira Siff. On May 8, 2021, she announced that the 2020–21 season would be her last, and she was set to retire in June 2021. Debra Lew Harder was announced as her replacement on September 21, 2021.

In May 2016, Heath was awarded the Distinguished Alumni Award of the Eastman School of Music and spoke at the commencement ceremony.

Mary Jo Heath is married to Ronald Heath, a history teacher.
