= Peter Allen (American broadcaster) =

American broadcaster and radio announcer (1920–2016)

- Born: Harold Levy; September 17, 1920; Toronto, Ontario, Canada
- Died: October 8, 2016 (aged 96); New York City, New York, U.S.
- Citizenship: American
- Education: Ohio State University
- Occupation: Broadcaster
- Years active: 1946–2004
- Known for: Hosting Metropolitan Opera radio broadcasts
- Spouse: Sylvia Lipson (died 2006)

Peter Allen (born Harold Levy; September 17, 1920 – October 8, 2016) was a Canadian-born American broadcaster and radio announcer, noted for hosting the Saturday afternoon radio broadcasts of the Metropolitan Opera for some 29 years.

== Early years ==
Allen was born Harold Levy in Toronto, Ontario, Canada He later moved with his parents to the United States, and grew up in Cleveland, Ohio. Allen was a Phi Beta Kappa graduate of Ohio State University. He served in the U.S. Navy during World War II.

== Radio and television ==
Allen began his radio career at the OSU station, WOSU, and also worked for a commercial station in Columbus. The couple then moved to New York City, where Allen began his long tenure as announcer at WQXR radio in 1947. His connection with the Metropolitan Opera began in 1973 when he served as the backup for Milton Cross who had been announcing the Met's Saturday afternoon broadcasts since their inception in 1931.

In 1975, after Cross's sudden death, Allen took over as announcer for the Met and continued in the job until 2004. The smooth, intelligent delivery and warmth of Allen's on-air persona endeared him to millions of opera listeners during his long tenure at the Met. Allen retired in May 2004 after 29 seasons and was succeeded by Margaret Juntwait.

Allen was also the announcer for Live from the Metropolitan Opera broadcasts on television.

Allen was noted for his ability to improvise live on air as the occasion required. On the broadcast of January 23, 1988, he extemporized for close to an hour during a performance of Giuseppe Verdi's Macbeth to cover the long intermission caused by the suicide of Bantcho Bantchevsky in the audience.

== Other professional activities ==
In addition to his live radio career, Allen recorded a popular series of spoken analyses and introductions to the four operas of Wagner's Der Ring des Nibelungen and other operas. Several popular books about opera published for the Metropolitan were also edited and introduced by Allen.

He also narrated more than 100 films. He has Narrated the 1962 Audio Fidelity vinyl LP record 'Stereo Spectacular Demonstration & Sound Effects'.

== Personal life ==
At Ohio State, Allen met his future wife, Sylvia, an artist and the sister of the Broadway actor Paul Lipson. Sylvia Lipson Allen died in 2006.

Allen lived in Stuyvesant Town–Peter Cooper Village in Manhattan, residing in the same apartment for over 70 years. He died there on October 8, 2016, aged 96.
