= Metropolitan Opera =

Opera company in New York City

Coordinates: 40°46′22″N 73°59′3″W

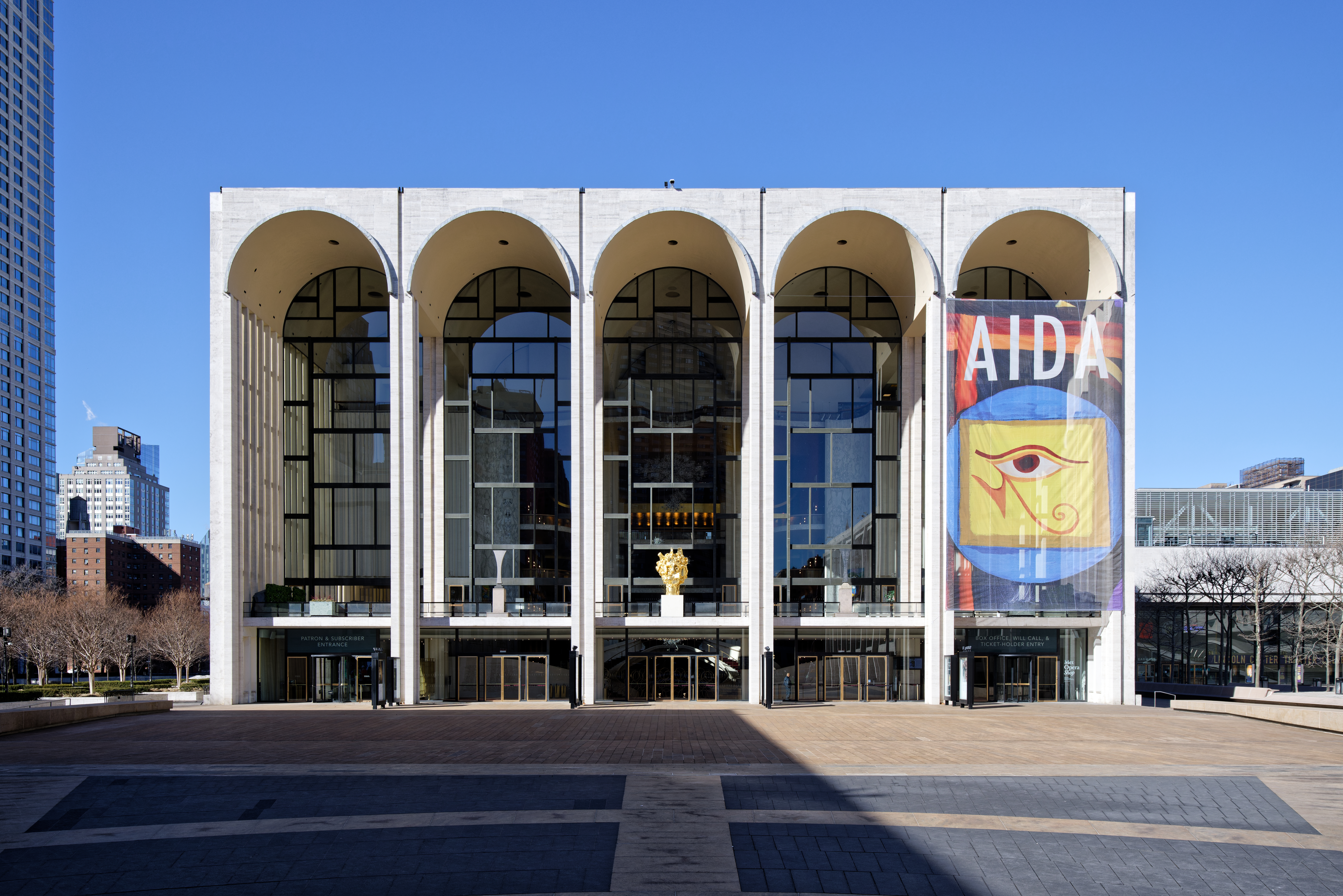
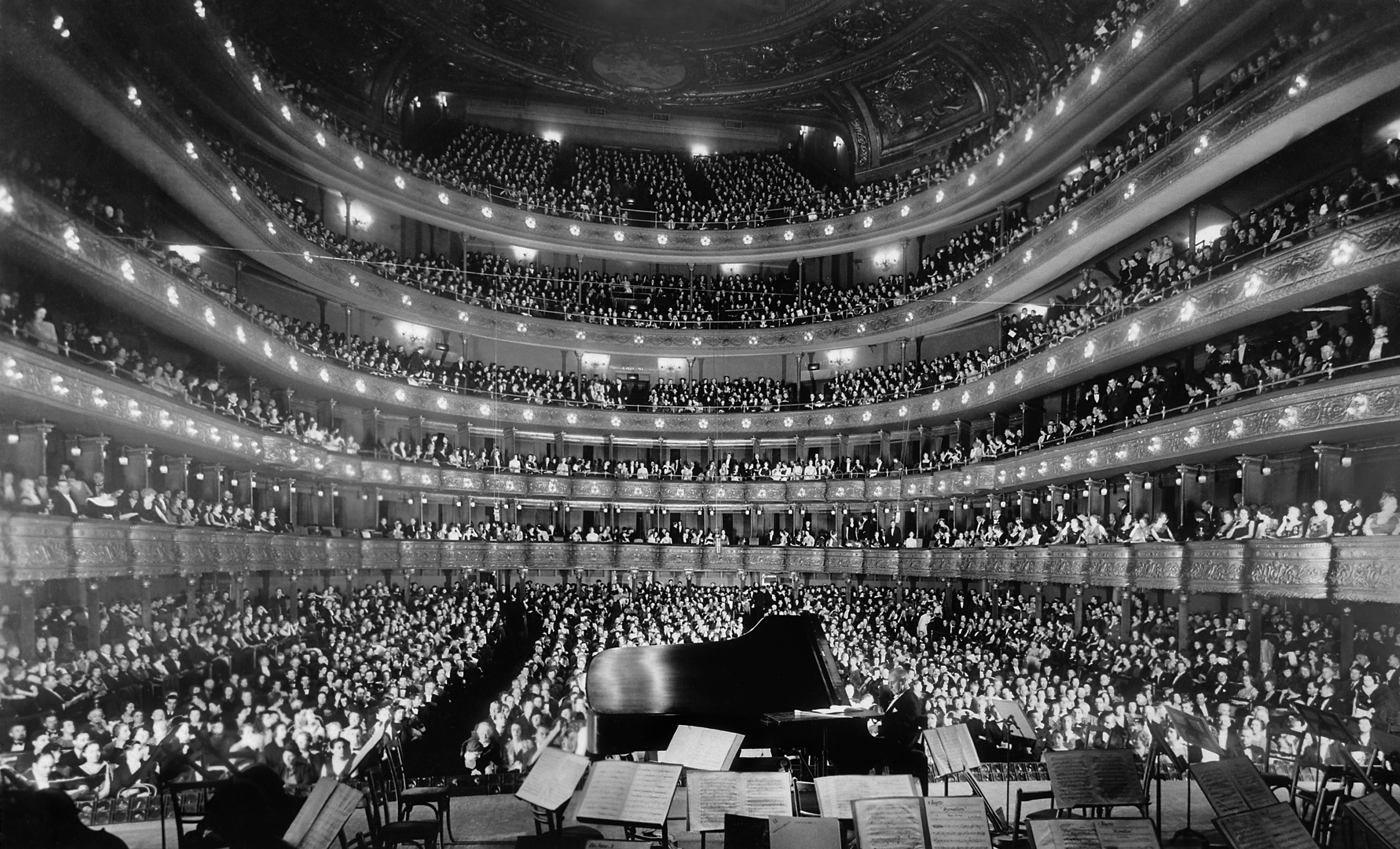
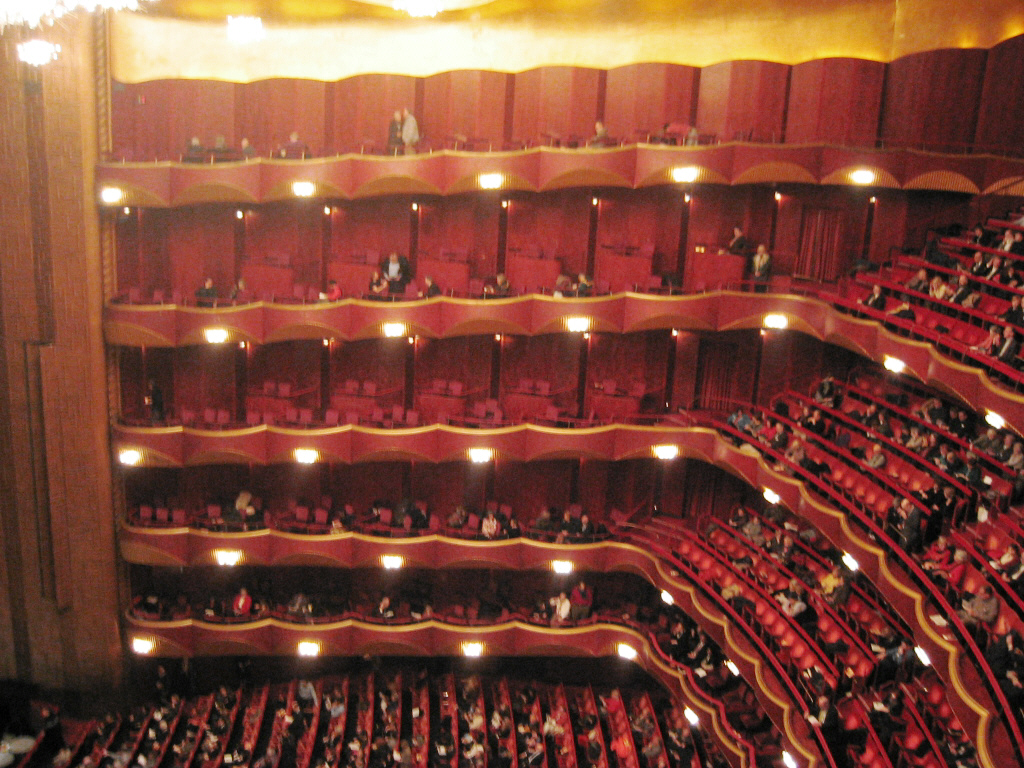
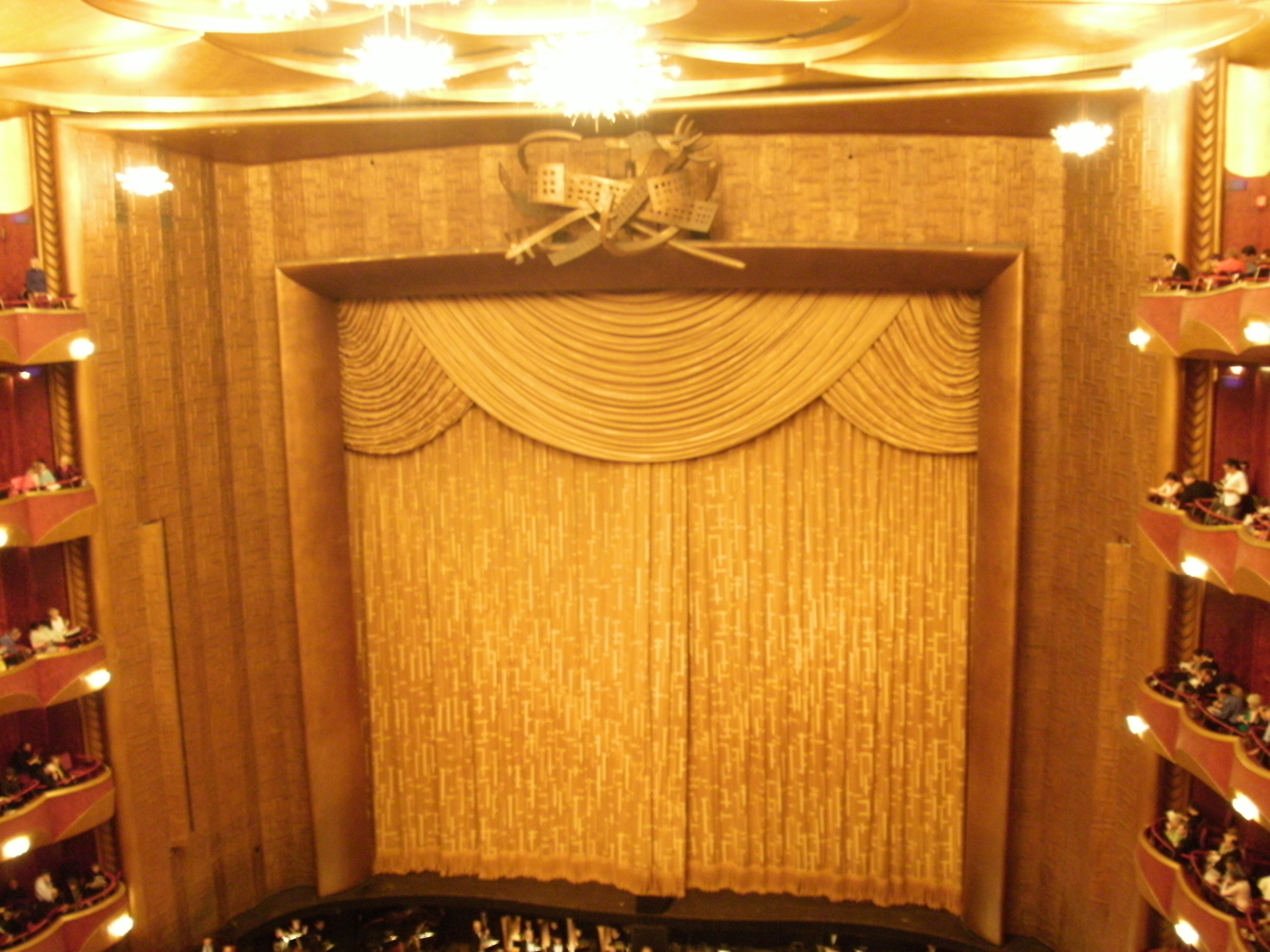
- Metropolitan Opera House at Lincoln Center, home of the Metropolitan Opera since 1966 Full house at the old Metropolitan Opera House, seen from the rear of the stage, at a concert by pianist Josef Hofmann, November 28, 1937 Auditorium of the Metropolitan Opera House at Lincoln Center Gold curtain, a gift of the Metropolitan Opera Club, in the auditorium
- Nickname: the Met
- Formation: 1883
- Type: Opera company
- Location(s): Metropolitan Opera House; New York City
- General manager: Peter Gelb
- Music director: Yannick Nézet-Séguin
- Website: www.metopera.org

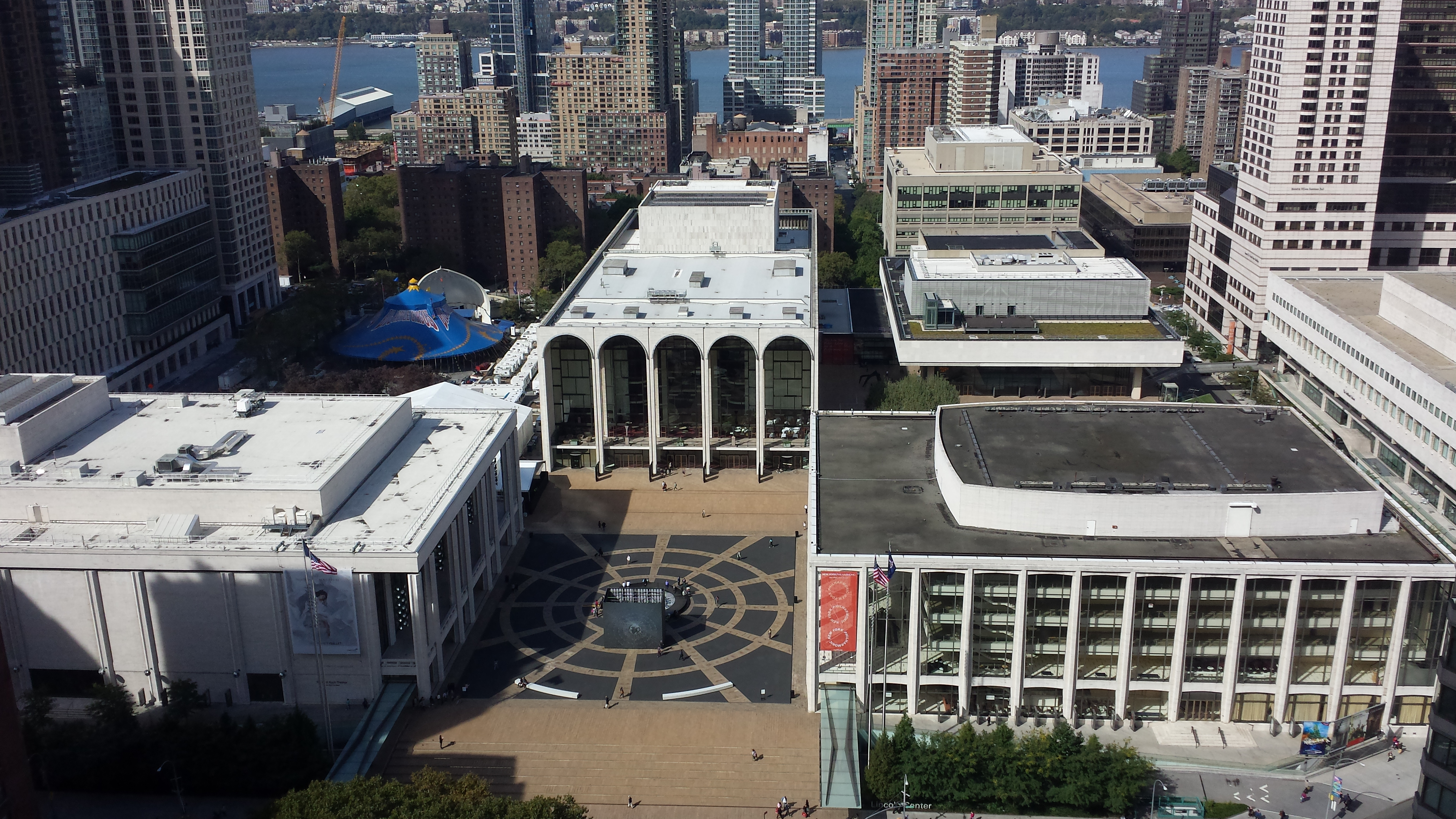
Metropolitan Opera and Lincoln Center

The Metropolitan Opera is an American opera company based in New York City, currently resident at the Metropolitan Opera House at Lincoln Center, situated on the Upper West Side of Manhattan. Referred to colloquially as the Met, (Note: In addition to, among other institutions, the Metropolitan Museum of Art, also in New York.) the company is operated by the non-profit Metropolitan Opera Association, with Peter Gelb as general manager. The company's music director has been Yannick Nézet-Séguin since 2018.

The Met was founded in 1883 as an alternative to the previously-established Academy of Music opera house, and debuted the same year in a purpose built building on 39th and Broadway (now known as the "Old Met"). The company moved to its present Lincoln Center location in 1966.

The Metropolitan Opera is the largest classical music organization in North America. The company presents about 18 different operas each year; these are staged during the 'season' of the company — typically from late September through early June of the following year (though, recently, February performances have ceased). Operas are presented in a rotating repertory schedule, with up to seven performances of as many as four different works staged each week. Performances are given in the evening Monday through Saturday; matinées are offered on Saturdays and some Sundays during the season. Several operas are presented in new productions each season; sometimes, these are borrowed from, shared with, or co-produced alongside other opera companies. The rest of the year's operas are revivals of productions from previous seasons. The 2015–16 season, for example, comprised 227 performances of 25 operas.

The operas in the Met's repertoire consist of a wide range of works, from 18th-century Baroque and 19th-century Bel canto to the Minimalism of the late 20th and 21st centuries. These operas are presented in staged productions that range in style from those with elaborate traditional decors to others that feature modern conceptual designs.

The Met's performing company consists of a large symphony orchestra, a chorus, children's choir, and many supporting and leading solo singers. The company also employs numerous free-lance dancers, actors, musicians and other performers throughout the season. The Met's roster of singers includes both international and American artists, some of whose careers have been developed through the Met's young artists programs. While many singers appear periodically as guests with the company, others maintain a close long-standing association with the Met, appearing many times each season until they retire.

== History ==
=== Origins ===
The Metropolitan Opera Company was founded in 1883 as an alternative to New York's old established Academy of Music opera house. The subscribers to the academy's limited number of private boxes represented the highest stratum in New York society. By 1880, these "old money" families were loath to admit New York's newly wealthy industrialists into their long-established social circle. Frustrated with being excluded, the Metropolitan Opera's founding subscribers determined to build a new opera house that would outshine the old Academy in every way. A group of 22 men assembled at Delmonico's restaurant on April 28, 1880. They elected officers and established subscriptions for ownership in the new company. The new theater, built at 39th and Broadway, would include three tiers of private boxes in which the scions of New York's powerful new industrial families could display their wealth and establish their social prominence. The first subscribers included members of the Morgan, Roosevelt, and Vanderbilt families, all of whom had been excluded from the academy. The new Metropolitan Opera House opened on October 22, 1883, and was an immediate success, both socially and artistically. The Academy of Music's opera season folded just three years after the Met opened.

=== Inaugural season ===
In its early decades the Met did not produce the opera performances itself but hired prominent manager/impresarios to stage a season of opera at the new Metropolitan Opera House. Henry Abbey served as manager for the inaugural season, 1883–84, which opened with a performance of Charles Gounod's Faust starring the brilliant Swedish soprano Christina Nilsson. Abbey's company that first season featured an ensemble of artists led by sopranos Nilsson and Marcella Sembrich; mezzo-soprano Sofia Scalchi; tenors Italo Campanini and Roberto Stagno; baritones Giuseppe Del Puente and Joseph Kaschmann; and bass Franco Novara. They gave 150 performances of 20 different operas by Gounod, Meyerbeer, Bellini, Donizetti, Verdi, Wagner, Mozart, Thomas, Bizet, Flotow, and Ponchielli. All performances were sung in Italian and were conducted either by music director Auguste Vianesi or Cleofonte Campanini (the tenor Italo's brother).

The company performed not only in the new Manhattan opera house, but also started a long tradition of touring throughout the country. In the winter and spring of 1884 the Met presented opera in theaters in Brooklyn, Boston, Philadelphia (see below), Chicago, St. Louis, Cincinnati, Washington D.C., and Baltimore. Back in New York, the last night of the season featured a long gala performance to benefit Mr. Abbey. The special program consisted not only of various scenes from opera, but also offered Marcella Sembrich playing the violin and the piano, as well as the famed stage actors Henry Irving and Ellen Terry in a scene from Shakespeare's The Merchant of Venice. Abbey's inaugural season resulted in very large financial deficits.

==== The Met in Philadelphia ====
The Metropolitan Opera began a long history of performing in Philadelphia during its first season, presenting its entire repertoire in the city during January and April 1884. The company's first Philadelphia performance was of Faust (with Christina Nilsson) on January 14, 1884, at the Chestnut Street Opera House. The Met continued to perform annually in Philadelphia for nearly eighty years, taking the entire company to the city on selected Tuesday nights throughout the opera season. Performances were usually held at Philadelphia's Academy of Music, with the company presenting close to 900 performances in the city by 1961 when the Met's regular visits ceased.

On April 26, 1910, the Met purchased the Philadelphia Opera House from Oscar Hammerstein I. The company renamed the house the Metropolitan Opera House and performed all of their Philadelphia performances there until 1920, when the company sold the theater and resumed performing at the Academy of Music.

During the Met's early years, the company annually presented a dozen or more opera performances in Philadelphia throughout the season. Over the years the number of performances was gradually reduced until the final Philadelphia season in 1961 consisted of only four operas. The final performance of that last season was on March 21, 1961, with Birgit Nilsson and Franco Corelli in Turandot. After the Tuesday night visits were ended, the Met still returned to Philadelphia on its spring tours in 1967, 1968, 1978, and 1979.

=== German seasons ===
For its second season, the Met's directors turned to Leopold Damrosch as general manager. The conductor of the New York Symphony Orchestra was engaged to lead the opera company in an all German language repertory and serve as its chief conductor. Under Damrosch, the company consisted of some the most celebrated singers from Europe's German-language opera houses. The new German Met found great popular and critical success in the works of Wagner and other German composers as well as in Italian and French operas sung in German. Damrosch died only months into his first season at the Met. Edmund C. Stanton replaced Damrosch the following year and served as general manager through the 1890–91 season. The Met's six German seasons were especially noted for performances by the celebrated conductor Anton Seidl whose Wagner interpretations were noted for their almost mystical intensity. The conductor Walter Damrosch, Leopold's son, also initiated a long relationship with the Met during this period.

==== Mapleson Cylinders ====
From 1900 to 1904, Lionel Mapleson (1865–1937) made a series of sound recordings at the Met. Mapleson, the nephew of the opera impresario James Henry Mapleson, was employed by the Met as a violinist and music librarian. He used an Edison cylinder phonograph set-up near the stage to capture short, one- to five-minute recordings of the soloists, chorus and orchestra during performances. These unique acoustic documents, known as the Mapleson Cylinders, preserve an audio picture of the early Met, and are the only known extant recordings of some performers, including the tenor Jean de Reszke and the dramatic soprano Milka Ternina. The recordings were later issued on a series of LPs and, in 2002, were included in the National Recording Registry. (Note: While many of the cylinders became greatly worn over the years, some remain comparatively clear, particularly those of the waltz and "Soldier's Chorus" from Faust and the triumphal scene from act 2 of Aida. Mapleson placed his machine in various locations, including the prompter's box, the side of the stage, and in the "flies", which enabled him to record the singers and musicians, as well as the audience's applause. Many of the original cylinders are preserved in the Rodgers & Hammerstein Archives of Recorded Sound at the New York Public Library for the Performing Arts.)

==== Touring ====
Beginning in 1898, the Metropolitan Opera company of singers and musicians undertook a six-week tour of American cities following its season in New York. These annual spring tours brought the company and its stars to cities throughout the U.S., most of which had no opera company of their own.

In Cleveland, for example, Met stops were sporadic until 1924, when underwriting efforts spearheaded by Newton D. Baker led to 3 consecutive years of annual 8-engagement performances. This led to the formation of the Northern Ohio Opera Association led by future U.S. Senator Robert J. Bulkley with the express purpose of underwriting long-term touring contracts with the Met. Cleveland was a particular lucrative stop for the Met, which had no competition in the form of a local opera company, and performances were held in the enormous Public Auditorium, which sat well over 9,000 people. The Met's national tours continued until 1986.

The Met also has a long history of international tours, stretching back to its first European visit to Paris in 1910. More recently, the company made a noteworthy tour of Japan in 2011, marking its seventh tour of the country since 1975, in the wake of the Fukushima nuclear disaster that resulted from a severe earthquake and subsequent tsunami. The company performed Puccini's La Bohème, Verdi's Don Carlo, and Donizetti's Lucia di Lammermoor.

Beginning in 2023, the company reinstated tours of the Met Orchestra. The European tour in June and July 2023, with stops in London, Paris, and Baden-Baden, marked the orchestra's first tour to Europe in more than 20 years. The orchestra made its first-ever tour of Asia in the summer of 2024, performing in Seoul, Hyogo, Tokyo, and Taipei.

==== Saudi funding ====
In 2025, director Peter Gelb announced that the Met would be beginning an annual winter residency at the Royal Diriyah Opera House in Riyadh for five years in exchange for more than $200 million over eight years from the Kingdom of Saudi Arabia. This donation was in the wake of financial difficulties that had led the Met to withdraw more than a third of the money in its endowment fund.

In 2026, Gelb stated that the contribution from the Saudis had been delayed and as a result, the Met would be reducing the number of productions in its next season, laying off twenty-two employees, and was considering selling the Marc Chagall murals that had been commissioned for the opera house's lobby.

On April 23, 2026, Gelb stated that the Saudi funding had been cancelled due to the damage caused to the country's economy by the 2026 Iran war and the oil blockade at the Strait of Hormuz. With the collapse of the Saudi funding, the Met faces a $30 million deficit that it needs to fill by July 31, 2026.

== Administrations ==
=== Abbey, Schoeffel, and Grau ===
Italian opera returned to the Met in 1891 in a glittering season of stars organized by the returning Henry E. Abbey, John B. Schoeffel and Maurice Grau as Abbey, Schoeffel and Grau. After missing a season to rebuild the opera house following a fire in August 1892 which destroyed most of the theater, Abbey and Grau continued as co-managers along with John Schoeffel as the business partner, initiating the so-called "Golden Age of Opera". Most of the greatest operatic artists in the world then graced the stage of the Metropolitan Opera House in Italian as well as German and French repertory. Notable among them were the brothers Jean and Édouard de Reszke, Lilli Lehmann, Emma Calvé, Lillian Nordica, Nellie Melba, Marcella Sembrich, Milka Ternina, Emma Eames, Sofia Scalchi, Ernestine Schumann-Heink, Francesco Tamagno, Francesc Viñas, Jean Lassalle, Mario Ancona, Victor Maurel, Antonio Scotti and Pol Plançon. Henry Abbey died in 1896, and Maurice Grau continued as sole manager of the Met from 1896 to 1903.

The early 1900s saw the development of distinct Italian, German and later French "wings" within the Met's roster of artists including separate German and Italian choruses. This division of the company's forces faded after World War II when solo artists spent less time engaged at any one company.

=== Heinrich Conried ===
The administration of Heinrich Conried in 1903–08 was distinguished especially by the arrival of the Neapolitan tenor Enrico Caruso, the most celebrated singer who ever appeared at the old Metropolitan. He was also instrumental in hiring conductor Arturo Vigna.

=== Giulio Gatti-Casazza ===
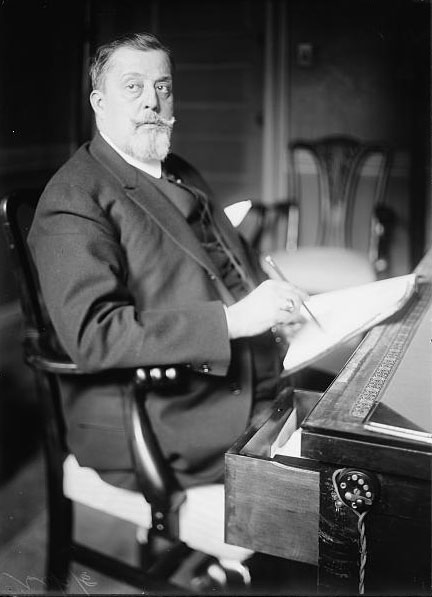
Giulio Gatti-Casazza

Conried was followed by Giulio Gatti-Casazza, who held a 27-year tenure from 1908 to 1935. Gatti-Casazza had been lured by the Met from a tenure as director of Milan's La Scala Opera House. His model planning, authoritative organizational skills and casts raised the Metropolitan Opera to an era of artistic innovation and musical excellence. He brought with him the conductor Arturo Toscanini, the music director from his seasons at La Scala.

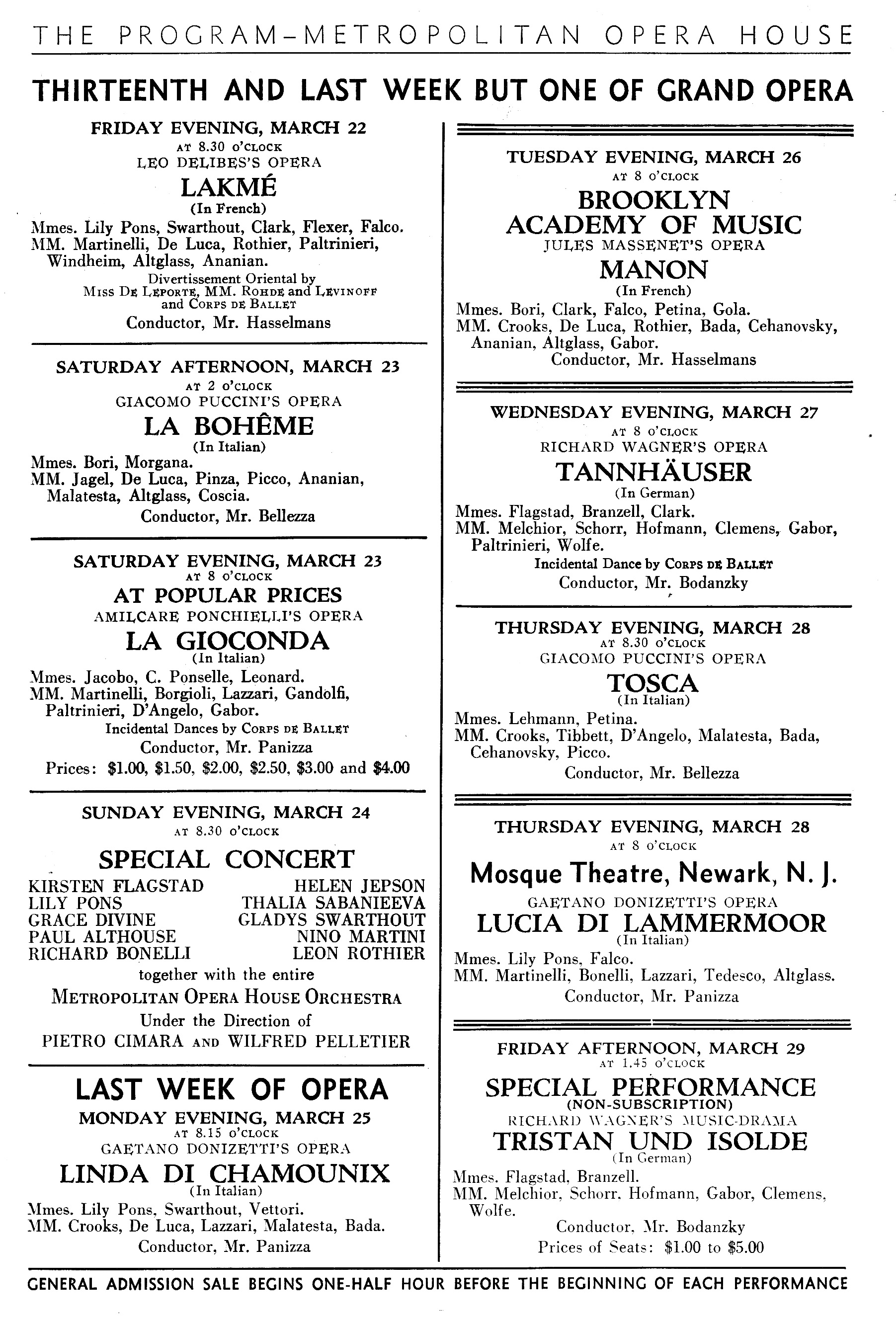
Gatti-Casazza's last week at the Met (March 22–29, 1935)

Many of the most noted singers of the era appeared at the Met under Gatti-Casazza's leadership, including sopranos Rosa Ponselle, Elisabeth Rethberg, Maria Jeritza, Emmy Destinn, Frances Alda, Frida Leider, Amelita Galli-Curci, Bernice de Pasquali, and Lily Pons; tenors Jacques Urlus, Giovanni Martinelli, Beniamino Gigli, Giacomo Lauri-Volpi, and Lauritz Melchior; baritones Titta Ruffo, Giuseppe De Luca, Pasquale Amato, and Lawrence Tibbett; and basses Friedrich Schorr, Feodor Chaliapin, José Mardones, Tancredi Pasero and Ezio Pinza—among many others.

Toscanini served as the Met's principal conductor (but with no official title) from 1908 to 1915, leading the company in performances of Verdi, Wagner and others that set standards for the company for decades to come. The Viennese composer Gustav Mahler also was a Met conductor during Gatti-Casazza's first two seasons and in later years conductors Tullio Serafin and Artur Bodanzky led the company in the Italian and German repertories respectively.

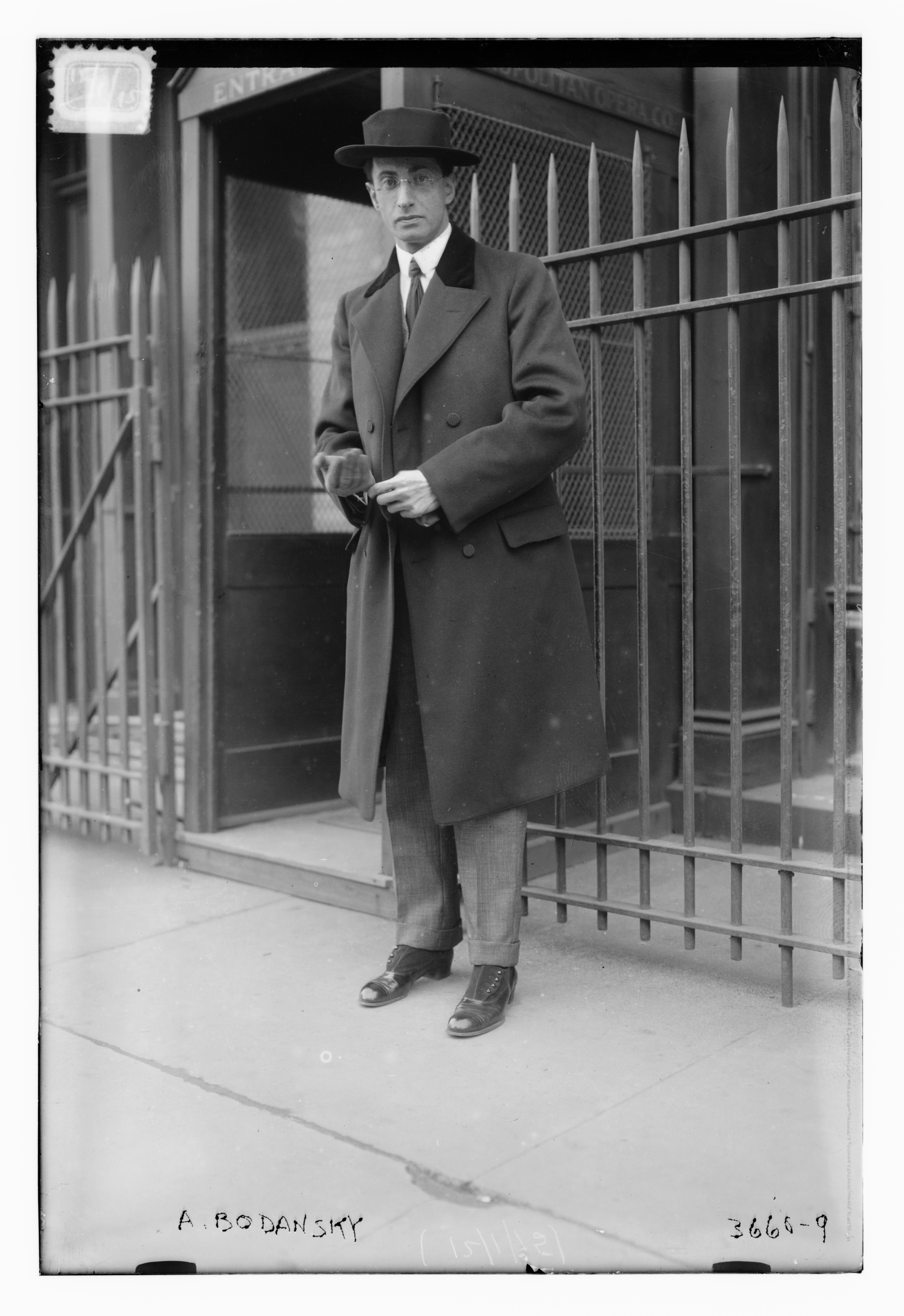
Artur Bodanzky at the Metropolitan Opera in 1915

Following Toscanini's departure, Gatti-Casazza successfully guided the company through the years of World War I into another decade of premieres, new productions and popular success in the 1920s. The 1930s, however, brought new financial and organizational challenges for the company. In 1931, Otto Kahn, the noted financier, resigned as head of the Met's board of directors and president of the Metropolitan Opera Company. He had been responsible for engaging Gatti-Casazza and had held the position of president since the beginning of Gatti-Casazza's term as manager. The new chair, prominent lawyer Paul Cravath, had served as the board's legal counsel. Retaining Gatti-Casazza as manager, Cravath focused his attention on managing the business affairs of the company.

In 1926, as part of the construction of Rockefeller Center, a plan was floated to move the opera from the building on 39th Street to the new Rockefeller Center. The plan was dropped in 1929 when it became apparent that it would produce no savings, and because the Met did not have enough money to move to a new opera house. It soon became apparent that the Wall Street Crash of 1929 and subsequent depression had resulted in a dangerously large deficit in the company's accounts. Between 1929 and 1931 ticket sales remained robust, but subsidies from the Met's wealthy supporters had significantly declined.

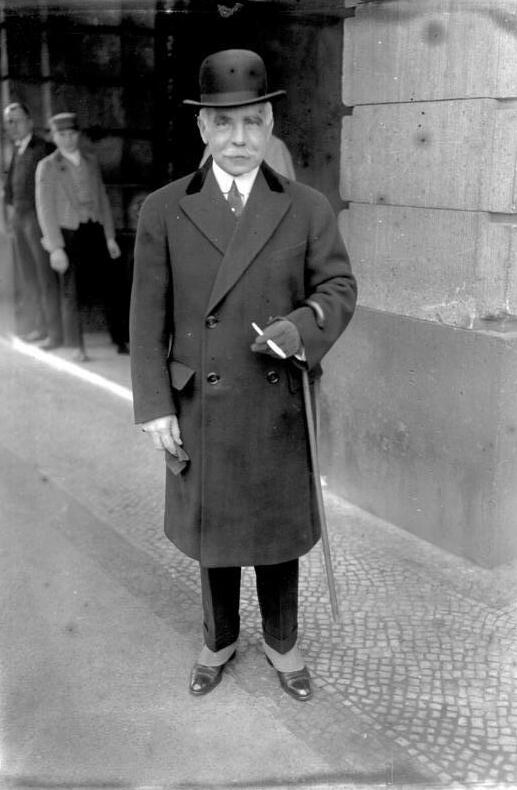
Otto Hermann Kahn in Berlin, 1931

Soon after his appointment, Cravath obtained new revenue through a contract with the National Broadcasting Company for weekly radio broadcasts of Met performances. The first national broadcast took place December 25, 1931, when Hansel and Gretel was aired. (Note: See more on the national broadcasts in the § Broadcast radio section.) With Gatti's support, Cravath also obtained a ten percent reduction in the pay of all salaried employees beginning with the opera season of 1931/32. Cravath also engineered a reorganization of the management company by which it was transformed from a corporation, in which all participants were stockholders, to an association, whose members need not have a financial interest in operations. Apart from this change, the new Metropolitan Opera Association was virtually identical to the old Metropolitan Opera Company. It was hoped the association would be able to save money as it renegotiated contracts which the company had made.

During this period there was no change in the organization of the Metropolitan Real Estate Opera Company which owned the opera house. It remained in the hands of the society families who owned its stock, yet the subsidies that the house and its owners had given the producing company fell off. In March 1932, Cravath found that income resulting from the broadcasts and savings from both salary cuts and reorganization were not sufficient to cover the company's deficits. Representatives of the opera house, the producing company, and the artists formed a committee for fundraising among the public at large. Mainly though appeals made to radio audiences during the weekly broadcasts, the committee was able to obtain enough money to assure continuation of opera for the 1933–34 season. Called the committee to Save Metropolitan Opera, the group was headed by the well-loved leading soprano, Lucrezia Bori. Bori not only led the committee, but also personally carried out much of its work and within a few months her fundraising efforts produced the $300,000 that were needed for the coming season.

=== Edward Johnson ===
In April 1935, Gatti stepped down after 27 years as general manager. His immediate successor, the former Met bass Herbert Witherspoon, died of a heart attack barely six weeks into his term of office. This opened the way for the Canadian tenor and former Met artist Edward Johnson to be appointed general manager. Johnson served the company for the next 15 years, guiding the Met through the remaining years of the depression and the World War II era.

The producing company's financial difficulties continued in the years immediately following the desperate season of 1933–34. To meet budget shortfalls, fundraising continued and the number of performances was curtailed. Still, on given nights the brilliant Wagner pairing of the Norwegian soprano Kirsten Flagstad with the great heldentenor Lauritz Melchior proved irresistible to audiences even in such troubled times. To expand the Met's support among its national radio audience, the Met board's Eleanor Robson Belmont, the former actress and wife to industrialist August Belmont, was appointed head of a new organization—the Metropolitan Opera Guild—as successor to a women's club Belmont had set up. The Guild supported the producing company through subscriptions to its magazine, Opera News, and through Mrs. Belmont's weekly appeals on the Met's radio broadcasts. In 1940 ownership of the performing company and the opera house was transferred to the non-profit Metropolitan Opera Association from the company's original partnership of New York society families.

Zinka Milanov, Jussi Björling, and Alexander Kipnis were first heard at the Met under Johnson's management. During World War II when many European artists were unavailable, the Met recruited American singers as never before. Eleanor Steber, Dorothy Kirsten, Helen Traubel (Flagstad's successor as Wagner's heroines), Jan Peerce, Richard Tucker, Leonard Warren and Robert Merrill were among the many home grown artists to become stars at the Met in the 1940s. Ettore Panizza, Sir Thomas Beecham, George Szell and Bruno Walter were among the leading conductors engaged during Johnson's tenure. Kurt Adler began his long tenure as chorus master and staff conductor in 1943.

=== Rudolf Bing ===
Succeeding Johnson in 1950 was the Austrian-born Rudolf Bing who had most recently created and served as director of the Edinburgh Festival. Serving from 1950 to 1972, Bing became one of the Met's most influential and reformist leaders. Bing modernized the administration of the company, ended an archaic ticket sales system, and brought an end to the company's Tuesday night performances in Philadelphia. He presided over an era of fine singing and glittering new productions, while guiding the company's move to a new home in Lincoln Center. While many outstanding singers debuted at the Met under Bing's guiding hand, music critics complained of a lack of great conducting during his regime, even though such eminent conductors as Fritz Stiedry, Dimitri Mitropoulos, Erich Leinsdorf, Fritz Reiner, and Karl Böhm appeared frequently in the 1950s and '60s.

Among the most significant achievements of Bing's tenure was the opening of the Met's artistic roster to include singers of color. Marian Anderson's historic 1955 debut was followed by the introduction of a gifted generation of African American artists led by Leontyne Price (who inaugurated the new house at Lincoln Center), Reri Grist, Grace Bumbry, Shirley Verrett, Martina Arroyo, George Shirley, Robert McFerrin, and many others. Other celebrated singers who debuted at the Met during Bing's tenure include: Roberta Peters, Victoria de los Ángeles, Renata Tebaldi, Maria Callas, who had a bitter falling out with Bing over repertoire,, Birgit Nilsson, Joan Sutherland, Régine Crespin, Mirella Freni, Renata Scotto, Montserrat Caballé, Elisabeth Schwarzkopf, Anna Moffo, James McCracken, Carlo Bergonzi, Franco Corelli, Alfredo Kraus, Plácido Domingo, Nicolai Gedda, Luciano Pavarotti, Jon Vickers, Tito Gobbi, Sherrill Milnes, and Cesare Siepi.

The Met's 1961 production of Turandot, with Leopold Stokowski conducting, Birgit Nilsson in the title role, and Franco Corelli as Calàf, was called the Met's "biggest hit in 10 years". For the 1962/1963 season, Renata Tebaldi, popular with Met audiences, convinced a reluctant Bing to stage a revival of Adriana Lecouvreur, an opera last presented at the Met in 1907.

In 1963, Anthony A. Bliss, a prominent New York lawyer and president of the Metropolitan Opera Association (MOA), convinced the MOA to create the Metropolitan Opera National Company (MONC); a second touring company that would present operas nationally with young operatic talent. Supported by President John F. Kennedy and funded largely by donations given by philanthropist and publisher Lila Acheson Wallace, the company presented two seasons of operas in 1965–1966 and 1966–1967 in which hundreds of performances were given in hundreds of cities throughout the United States. Bing publicly supported the organization, but privately detested the idea and actively worked to dismantle the company which he ultimately achieved in a vote of the board in December 1966. The MONC's directors were mezzo-soprano Risë Stevens and Michael Manuel, a long time stage manager and director at the Met. Several well known opera singers performed with the MONC, including sopranos Clarice Carson, Maralin Niska, Mary Beth Peil, Francesca Roberto, and Marilyn Zschau; mezzo-sopranos Joy Davidson, Sylvia Friederich, Dorothy Krebill, and Huguette Tourangeau; tenors Enrico Di Giuseppe, Chris Lachona, Nicholas di Virgilio, and Harry Theyard; baritones Ron Bottcher, John Fiorito, Thomas Jamerson, Julian Patrick, and Vern Shinall; bass-baritones Andrij Dobriansky, Ronald Hedlund, and Arnold Voketaitis; and bass Paul Plishka.

During Bing's tenure, the officers of the Met joined forces with the officers of the New York Philharmonic to build the Lincoln Center for the Performing Arts, where the new Metropolitan Opera House building opened in 1966.

While the new Met opened with the world premiere of Samuel Barber's Antony and Cleopatra and its first season at Lincoln Center featured another world premiere, Marvin David Levy's Mourning Becomes Electra, as well as seven additional new productions, the company would not premiere any new operas for decades afterwards, until 1991's The Ghosts of Versailles by John Corigliano. One critic described the period as "a quarter-century in which the notion of commissioned work reminded Met administrators of the emblematic failure of Samuel Barber's Antony and Cleopatra and the lukewarm reception of Marvin David Levy's Mourning Becomes Electra."

=== Gentele to Southern ===
Following Bing's retirement in 1972, the Met's management was overseen by a succession of executives and artists in shared authority. Bing's intended successor, the Swedish opera manager Göran Gentele, died in an auto accident before the start of his first season. Following Gentele's death, Schuyler Chapin served as general manager for three seasons. The key achievement of his tenure was the Met's first tour to Japan for three weeks in May–June 1975 which was the brainchild of impresario Kazuko Hillyer. The tour played a significant role in popularizing opera in Japan, and boasted an impressive line-up of artists in productions of La traviata, Carmen, and La bohème; including Marilyn Horne as Carmen, Joan Sutherland as Violetta, and tenors Franco Corelli and Luciano Pavarotti alternating as Rodolfo. Soprano Renata Tebaldi retired from the Met in 1973 as Desdemona in Verdi's Otello, the same role she debuted there in 1955.

From 1975 to 1981, a triumvirate of directors led the company: the general manager (Anthony A. Bliss), artistic director (James Levine), and director of production (English stage director John Dexter). Bliss was followed by Bruce Crawford and Hugh Southern. Through this period, the constant figure was Levine. Engaged by Bing in 1971, Levine became principal conductor in 1973 and emerged as the Met's principal artistic leader through the last third of the 20th century.

During the 1983–1984 season, the Met celebrated its 100th anniversary with an opening night revival of Berlioz's opera Les Troyens, with soprano Jessye Norman making her Met debut in the roles of both Cassandra and Dido. An eight-hour Centennial Gala concert in two parts followed on October 22, 1983, broadcast on PBS. The gala featured all of the Met's current stars as well as appearances by 26 veteran stars of the Met's the past. Among the artists, Leonard Bernstein and Birgit Nilsson gave their last performances with the company at the concert. This season also marked the debut of bass Samuel Ramey, who debuted as Argante in Handel's Rinaldo in January 1984.

The immediate post-Bing era saw a continuing addition of African-Americans to the roster of leading artists. Kathleen Battle, who in 1977 made her Met debut as the Shepherd in Wagner's Tannhäuser, became an important star in lyric soprano roles. Bass-baritone Simon Estes began a prominent Met career with his 1982 debut as Hermann, also in Tannhäuser.

=== Joseph Volpe ===
The model of General Manager as the leading authority in the company returned in 1990 when the company appointed Joseph Volpe. He was the Met's third-longest serving manager, and was the first head of the company to advance from within its ranks, having started his career there as a carpenter in 1964. During his tenure, the Met's international touring activities were expanded and Levine focused on expanding and building the Met's orchestra into a world-class symphonic ensemble with its own Carnegie Hall concert series. Under Volpe, the Met considerably expanded its repertory, offering four world premieres and 22 Met premieres, more new works than under any manager since Gatti-Casazza. Volpe chose Valery Gergiev, who was then the chief conductor and artistic director of the Mariinsky Theatre, as Principal Guest Conductor in 1997 and broadened the Met's Russian repertory. Marcelo Álvarez, Gabriela Beňačková, Diana Damrau, Natalie Dessay, Renée Fleming, Juan Diego Flórez, Marcello Giordani, Angela Gheorghiu, Susan Graham, Ben Heppner, Dmitri Hvorostovsky, Salvatore Licitra, Anna Netrebko, René Pape, Neil Rosenshein, Bryn Terfel, and Deborah Voigt were among the artists first heard at the Met under his management. He retired as general manager in 2006.

=== Peter Gelb ===
Peter Gelb, formerly a record producer, succeeded Volpe as general manager of the company in 2006. Gelb began outlining his plans in April 2006; these included more new productions each year, ideas for shaving staging costs, and attracting new audiences without deterring existing opera-lovers. Gelb saw these issues as crucial for an organization which is dependent on private financing.

Gelb began his tenure by opening the 2006–2007 season with a production of Madama Butterfly by Anthony Minghella originally staged for English National Opera. Gelb focused on expanding the Met's audience through a number of fronts. Increasing the number of new productions every season to keep the Met's stagings fresh and noteworthy, Gelb partnered with other opera companies to import productions and engaged directors from theater, circus, and film to produce the Met's own original productions. Theater directors Bartlett Sher, Mary Zimmerman, and Jack O'Brien joined the list of the Met's directors along with Stephen Wadsworth, Willy Decker, Laurent Pelly, Luc Bondy and other opera directors to create new stagings for the company. Robert Lepage, the Canadian director of Cirque du Soleil, was engaged by the Met to direct a revival of Der Ring des Nibelungen using hydraulic stage platforms and projected 3D imagery. Gelb also initiated live high-definition video transmissions to cinemas worldwide, and regular live satellite radio broadcasts on the Met's own SiriusXM radio channel.

In 2010, the company named Fabio Luisi as its principal guest conductor in 2010, and subsequently its principal conductor in 2011, to fill a void created by Levine's two-year absence because of illness. In 2013, following the severance of the dancers' contracts, Gelb announced that the resident ballet company at the Met would cease to exist.

In 2014, Gelb and the Met found new controversy with a production of John Adams's opera The Death of Klinghoffer, due to criticism that the work was antisemitic. In response to the controversy Gelb canceled the scheduled worldwide HD video presentation of a performance, but refused demands to cancel the live performances scheduled for October and November 2014. Demonstrators held signs and chanted "Shame on Gelb".

On April 14, 2016, the company announced the conclusion of Levine's tenure as music director at the conclusion of the 2015–16 season. Gelb announced that Levine would also become Music Director Emeritus. On June 2, the Met board announced the appointment of Yannick Nézet-Séguin as the company's next music director, as of the 2020–2021 season, conducting five productions each season. He took the title of music director-designate, conducting two productions a year, as of the 2017–2018 season.

In February 2018, Nézet-Séguin succeeded Levine as music director of the Metropolitan Opera. In August 2024, the company announced the extension of Nézet-Séguin's contract as its music director through the 2029–2030 season.

In 2017, Daniele Rustioni first guest-conducted at the Metropolitan Opera. In November 2024, the company announced the appointment of Rustioni as its next principal guest conductor, effective with the 2025–2026 season, with an initial contract of three seasons.

==== James Levine controversy ====
In response to a December 2017 news article, the Met announced that it would investigate Levine with regard to sexual abuse allegations dating back to the 1980s. The company suspended its ties with Levine, and canceled all upcoming engagements with him. Gelb had been contacted directly by a police detective in October 2016 about allegations of sexual abuse of a minor by Levine, had been aware of the accuser's abuse allegations since they were made in a 2016 police report and of the attendant police investigation, but did not suspend Levine or launch an investigation until over a year later.

Following the investigations in March 2018, the Met stated that there was conclusive evidence for "sexually abusive and harassing conduct" by Levine. On March 12, 2018, the company announced the full termination of its relationship with Levine, including the rescinding of his title of music director emeritus and dismissal of him as artistic director of its young artists program. On March 15, 2018, Levine filed suit against the company with the New York State Supreme Court, for breach of contract and defamation, and continued to deny the allegations. In response to the suit, the company has stated: "It is shocking that Mr. Levine has refused to accept responsibility for his actions, and has today instead decided to lash out at the Met with a suit riddled with untruths." On August 7, 2019, The New York Times reported that the Metropolitan Opera and Levine both privately settled their lawsuits. Continuing with the lawsuits "could have put into the public record more details of accusations..."

==== Russia-Ukraine anti-war activism ====
On February 28, 2022, Gelb announced that because of the Russian invasion of Ukraine, the Met would be severing ties with all staff and employees who are supporters of Russian President Vladimir Putin. The same night, before the premiere of Verdi's Don Carlos, the Met's chorus and orchestra performed the national anthem of Ukraine. Among the singers was Ukrainian bass-baritone Vladyslav Buialskyi, making his Met debut; footage of him standing center-stage as the only singer without a score and with a hand over his heart was aired by Ukrainian news outlets.

In March 2022, Russian-born soprano Anna Netrebko made a public statement against the war but failed to explicitly denounce Putin, and was replaced by a Ukrainian singer. Netrebko had performed over 200 times at the Met over the past 20 years. Gelb called her dismissal "a great artistic loss for the Met and for opera" adding "but with Putin killing innocent victims in Ukraine there was no way forward" for her to continue to be associated with the Met.

On March 14, the Met hosted a benefit concert with all proceeds going to relief efforts in Ukraine, with Sergiy Kyslytsya, the Permanent Representative of Ukraine to the United Nations in attendance. The concert, which was broadcast on worldwide radio including Ukrainian public radio, began with Buialskyi singing the national anthem of Ukraine as a soloist.

In December 2022, the Metropolitan Opera website was a target of a ransomware attack, with a "speculation that Russia could be behind the cyberattack". Gelb rejected that rumor.

To mark the first anniversary of the invasion of Ukraine, the Met Opera held a concert entitled "For Ukraine: A Concert of Remembrance and Hope" on February 24, 2023. The company's music director, Yannick Nézet-Séguin, led the Met Orchestra and Chorus in a program of Mozart's Requiem and Beethoven's Fifth Symphony. Ukraine's ambassador to the United Nations, Sergiy Kyslytsya, said, "This is a concert in celebration of Ukrainian resilience and hope. The Metropolitan Opera was among the first to show solidarity with Ukraine, its people, culture, and artists, and it has continued to do so throughout the past year of this tragic invasion. We're proud to work with the Met to promote a just peace." He added, "All wars come to an end, but we will always remember who was with us from the first, most difficult, moments."

== The Met Orchestra Musicians ==
In 2015, The Metropolitan Opera Orchestra Committee formed a separate 501(c)3 organization which does business as 'Met Orchestra Musicians'. When the Metropolitan Opera furloughed its orchestra on April 1, 2020, the orchestra used this organization to fundraise with a goal to give out needs-based grants to its members, associates, music librarians and assistant conductors affiliated with the Metropolitan Opera. As of October 19, 2020, 30% of the orchestra reported having moved out of New York City due to high living costs.

== Technological innovations ==
=== Met Titles ===
In 1995, under general manager Joseph Volpe, the Met installed its own system of presenting a scripted version of opera texts designed for the particular needs of the Met and its audiences. Called "Met Titles", the $2.7 million system provides the audience with a script of the opera's text in English on individual screens which face each seat. This system was the first in the world to be placed in an opera house with "each screen (having) a switch to turn it on, a privacy filter to prevent the dim, yellow dot-matrix characters from disturbing nearby viewers and the option to display texts in multiple languages for all productions, (currently English, German, and Spanish). Occasionally, due to artistic choices, operas do not fully utilize the system, such as Satyagraha, where titles are projected onstage, and Akhnaten, where only scene headings are displayed, both by Philip Glass. The custom-designed system features rails of different heights for various sections of the house, individually designed displays for some box seats and commissioned scripts costing up to $10,000 apiece." Owing to the height of the Met's proscenium, it was not feasible to have surtitles displayed above the stage, as is done in most other opera houses. Levine had opposed the idea of above-stage titles, but the "Met Titles" system has since been acknowledged as an ideal solution, offering texts to only those members of the Met audience who desire them. Surtitlers at the Met have included Sonya Haddad, whose 2004 obituary called her "one of the country's leading practitioners of her art", Cori Ellison and Sonya Friedman.

=== Tessitura software ===
In 1998, Volpe initiated the development of a new software application, now called Tessitura. Tessitura uses a single database of information to record, track and manage all contacts with the Met's constituents, conduct targeted marketing and fund raising appeals, handle all ticketing and membership transactions, and provide detailed and flexible performance reports. Beginning in 2000, Tessitura was offered to other arts organizations under license, and it is now used by a cooperative network of more than 200 opera companies, symphony orchestras, ballet companies, theater companies, performing arts centers, and museums in the United States, Canada, the United Kingdom, Australia, New Zealand, and Ireland. At the Opera Conference 2016 in Montreal Gelb announced that the Met had commissioned a new ticketing system that would be made available to other institutions.

== Multimedia ==
=== Broadcast radio ===
Outside of New York the Met has been known to audiences in large measure through its many years of live radio broadcasts. The Met's broadcast history goes back to January 1910 when radio pioneer Lee de Forest broadcast experimentally, with erratic signal, two live performances from the stage of the Met that were reportedly heard as far away as Newark, New Jersey. Today the annual Met broadcast season typically begins the first week of December and offers twenty live Saturday matinée performances through May.

The first network broadcast was heard on December 25, 1931, a performance of Engelbert Humperdinck's Hänsel und Gretel. The series came about as the Met, financially endangered in the early years of the Great Depression, sought to enlarge its audience and support through national exposure on network radio. Initially, those broadcasts featured only parts of operas, being limited to selected acts. Regular broadcasts of complete operas began March 11, 1933, with the transmission of Tristan und Isolde with Frida Leider and Lauritz Melchior.

The live broadcasts were originally heard on NBC Radio's Blue Network and continued on the Blue Network's successor, ABC, into the 1960s. As network radio waned, the Met founded its own Metropolitan Opera Radio Network which is now heard on radio stations around the world. In Canada the live broadcasts have been heard since December 1933 first on the Canadian Radio Broadcasting Commission and, since 1934, on its successor, the Canadian Broadcasting Corporation where they are currently heard on CBC Music.

Technical quality of the broadcasts steadily improved over the years. FM broadcasts were added in the 1950s, transmitted to stations via telephone lines. Starting with the 1973–74 season, all broadcasts were offered in FM stereo. Satellite technology later allowed uniformly excellent broadcast sound to be sent live worldwide.

Sponsorship of the Met broadcasts during the Depression years of the 1930s was sporadic. Early sponsors included the American Tobacco Company, and the Lambert Pharmaceutical Company, but frequently the broadcasts were presented by NBC itself with no commercial sponsor. Sponsorship of the Saturday afternoon broadcasts by The Texas Company (Texaco) began on December 7, 1940, with Mozart's Le nozze di Figaro. Texaco's support continued for 63 years, the longest continuous sponsorship in broadcast history and included the first PBS television broadcasts. After its merger with Chevron, however, the combined company ChevronTexaco ended its sponsorship of the Met's radio network in April 2004. Emergency grants allowed the broadcasts to continue through 2005 when the home building company Toll Brothers became primary sponsor.

In the seven decades of its Saturday broadcasts, the Met has been introduced by the voices of only four permanent announcers. Milton Cross served from the inaugural 1931 broadcast until his death in 1975. He was succeeded by Peter Allen, who served for 29 years, through the 2003–04 season. Margaret Juntwait began her tenure as host the following season. From September 2006 through December 2014, Juntwait also served as host for all of the live and recorded broadcasts on the Met's SiriusXM satellite radio channel, Metropolitan Opera Radio. Beginning in January 2015, producer Mary Jo Heath filled in for Juntwait, who was being treated for cancer and died in June 2015. In September 2015, Heath took over as the new permanent host. Opera singer and director Ira Siff has for several years been the commentator, along with Juntwait or Heath. In September 2021, Debra Lew Harder took over as the Met's broadcast host, the fifth in company history.

=== Satellite radio ===
Metropolitan Opera Radio is a 24-hour opera channel on Sirius XM Radio, which presents multiple live opera broadcasts each week during the Met's performing season. During other hours it also offers past broadcasts from the Metropolitan Opera radio broadcast archives. The channel was created in September 2006, when the Met initiated a multi-year relationship with Sirius. Margaret Juntwait is the main host and announcer, with William Berger as writer and co-host.

=== Television ===
The Met's experiments with television go back to 1948 when a complete performance of Verdi's Otello was broadcast live on ABC-TV with Ramón Vinay, Licia Albanese, and Leonard Warren. The 1949 season opening night Der Rosenkavalier was also telecast. In the early 1950s the Met tried a short-lived experiment with live closed-circuit television transmissions to movie theaters. The first of these was a performance of Carmen with Risë Stevens which was sent to 31 theaters in 27 US cities on December 11, 1952. Beyond these experiments, however, and an occasional gala or special, the Met did not become a regular presence on television until 1977.

In that year the company began a series of live television broadcasts on public television with a wildly successful live telecast of La bohème with Renata Scotto and Luciano Pavarotti. The new series of opera on PBS was called Live from the Metropolitan Opera. This series remained on the air until the early 2000s, although the live broadcasts gave way to taped performances and in 1988 the title was changed to The Metropolitan Opera Presents. Dozens of televised performances were broadcast during the life of the series including an historic complete telecast of Wagner's Ring Cycle in 1989. In 2007 another Met television series debuted on PBS, Great Performances at the Met. This series airs repeat showings of the high-definition video performances produced for the Metropolitan Opera Live in HD cinema series.

In addition to complete operas and gala concerts, television programs produced at the Met have included: an episode of Omnibus with Leonard Bernstein (NBC, 1958); Danny Kaye's Look-In at the Metropolitan Opera (CBS, 1975); Sills and Burnett at the Met (CBS, 1976); and the MTV Video Music Awards (1999 and 2001).

=== High-definition video ===
Beginning on December 30, 2006, as part of the company's effort to build revenues and attract new audiences, the Met (along with NCM Fathom) broadcast a series of six performances live via satellite into movie theaters called "Metropolitan Opera: Live in HD". The first broadcast was the Saturday matinee live performance of the 110-minute version of Julie Taymor's production of The Magic Flute. The series was carried in over 100 movie theaters across North America, Japan, Britain and several other European countries. During the 2006–07 season, the series included live HD transmissions of I puritani, The First Emperor, Eugene Onegin, The Barber of Seville, and Il trittico. In addition, limited repeat showings of the operas were offered in most of the presenting cities. Digital sound for the performances was provided by Sirius Satellite Radio.

These movie transmissions have received wide and generally favorable press coverage. The Met reports that 91% of available seats were sold for the HD performances. According to General Manager Peter Gelb, there were 60,000 people in cinemas around the world watching the March 24 transmission of The Barber of Seville. (Note: Gelb, speaking during the intermission on March 24, 2007, noted that over 250 movie theatres were presenting the performance that day.) The New York Times reported that 324,000 tickets were sold worldwide for the 2006/07 season, while each simulcast cost $850,000 to $1 million to produce.

The 2007/08 season began on December 15, 2007, and featured eight of the Met's productions starting with Roméo et Juliette and ending with La fille du régiment on April 26, 2008. The Met planned to broadcast to double the number of theaters in the US as the previous season, as well as to additional countries such as Belgium, France, Germany, Italy, and Spain. The number of participating venues in the US, which includes movie theatre chains as well as independent theatres and some college campus venues, is 343. while "the scope of the series expands to include more than 700 locations across North America, Europe, Asia, and Australia".

By the end of the season 920,000 people—exceeding the total number of people who attended live performances at the Met over the entire season—attended the eight screenings bringing in a gross of $13.3 million from North America and $5 million from overseas.

=== Internet ===
Video and audio recordings of hundreds of complete operas and excerpts are available via Met Opera on Demand, the Met's own online archive of recorded performances. The Met Opera on Demand catalog currently holds more than 850 complete performances from the last 90 years, ranging from telecasts to radio broadcasts to recent Live in HD presentations. Complete operas and selections are also available to stream on Apple Music and Spotify and for purchase on iTunes.

The Metropolitan Opera Radio channel on Sirius XM Radio (see above) is available to listeners via the internet in addition to satellite broadcast.

The Met's official site also provides complete composer and background information, detailed plot summaries, and cast and characters for all current and upcoming opera broadcasts, as well as for every opera broadcast since 2000. The Met's online archive database provides an exhaustive searchable list of every performance and performer in the company's history, along with complete program and cast information.

==== COVID-19 pandemic ====
When people's movements were heavily restricted in March 2020 due to the COVID-19 pandemic, the Met cancelled the season's remaining performances but live streamed free of charge an opera every day, normally available on paid subscription. On September 23, 2020, the Met announced the cancellation of its entire 2020–2021 season. The Met reopened in time for the 2021–2022 season, beginning with a concert of Verdi's Requiem to mark the 20th anniversary of 9/11. On October 24, 2022, the Met, in conjunction with the NY Philharmonic and Carnegie Hall dropped their masking requirements, the last COVID-related restriction that was still in place.

== Opera houses ==
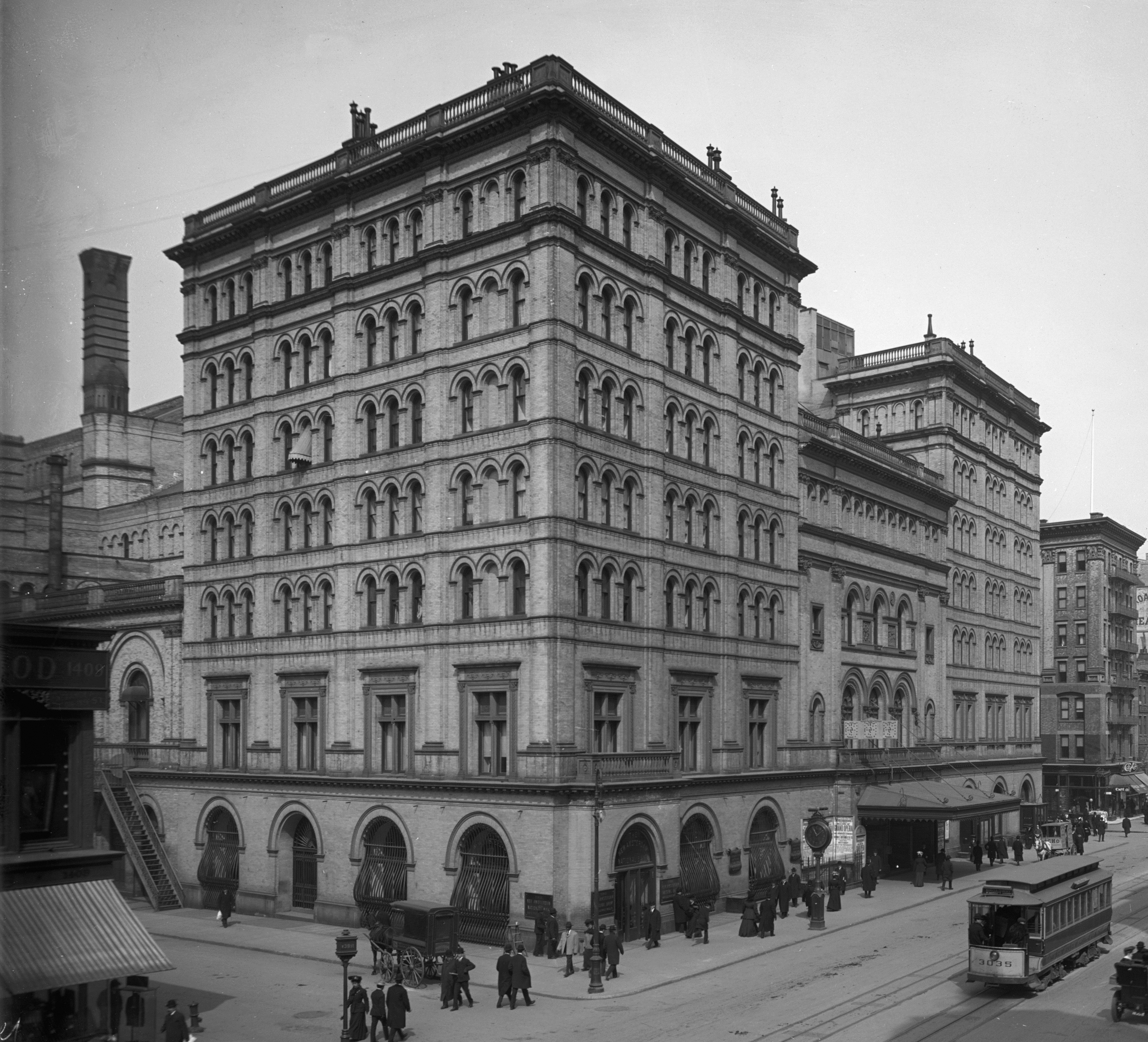
Metropolitan Opera House in 1905

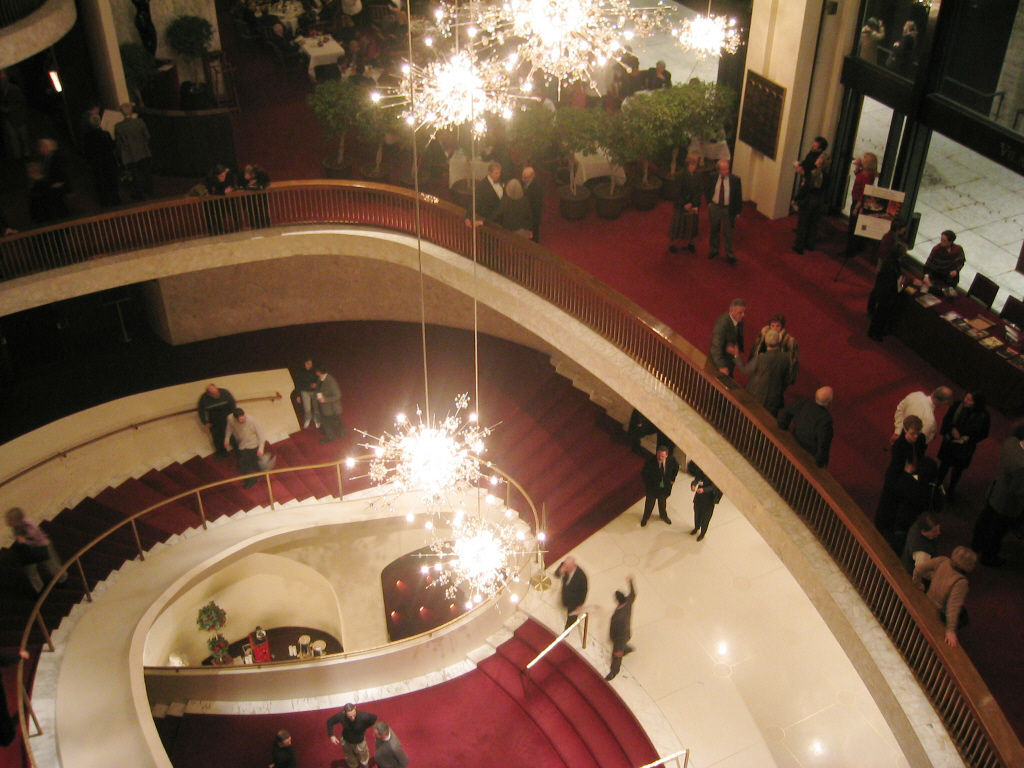
The Metropolitan Opera House at Lincoln Center

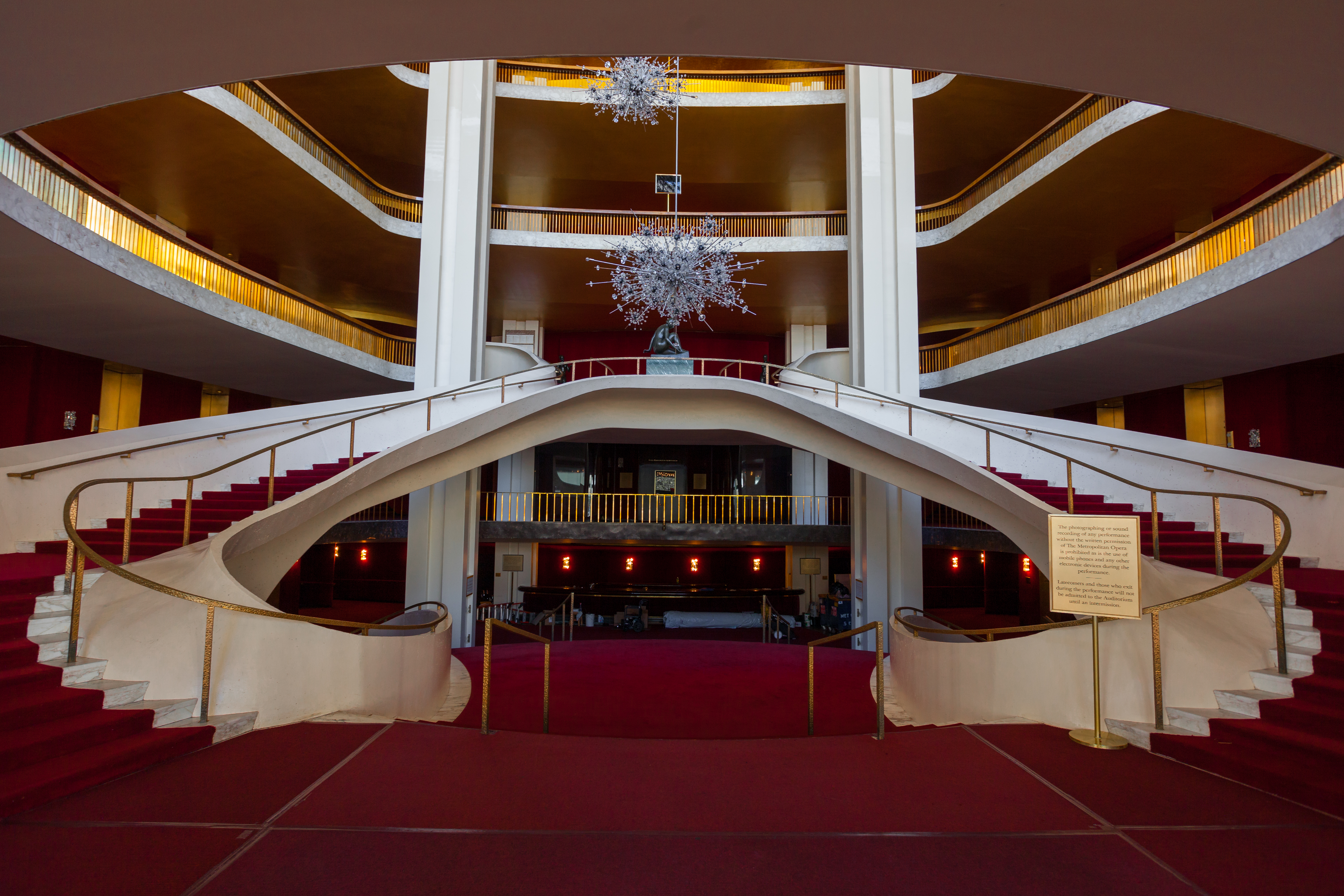
Staircase

=== Metropolitan Opera House, Broadway ===
The first Metropolitan Opera House opened on October 22, 1883, with a performance of Faust. It was located at 1411 Broadway between 39th and 40th Streets and was designed by J. Cleaveland Cady. Gutted by fire on August 27, 1892, the theater was immediately rebuilt, reopening in the fall of 1893. Another major renovation was completed in 1903. The theater's interior was extensively redesigned by the architects Carrère and Hastings. The familiar red and gold interior associated with the house dates from this time. The old Met had a seating capacity of 3,625 with an additional 224 standing room places.

The theater was noted for its elegance and excellent acoustics and it provided a glamorous home for the company. Its stage facilities, however, were found to be severely inadequate from its earliest days. Over the years many plans for a new opera house were explored and abandoned, including a proposal to incorporate a new Metropolitan Opera House into the construction of Rockefeller Center. It was only with the development of Lincoln Center that the Met was able to build itself a new home. The Met held a lavish farewell gala performance for the old house on April 16, 1966. The house closed after a short season of ballet later in the spring of 1966 and despite interest in preserving the theater, it was demolished in 1967.

=== Metropolitan Opera House, Lincoln Center ===
The present Metropolitan Opera House is located in Lincoln Center at Lincoln Square on the Upper West Side and was designed by architect Wallace K. Harrison. It has a seating capacity of approximately 3,732 with an additional 245 standing room places at the rear of the main floor and the top balcony. As needed, the size of the orchestra pit can be decreased and another row of 35 seats added at the front of the auditorium. The lobby is adorned with two famous murals by Marc Chagall, The Triumph of Music and The Sources of Music. Each of these gigantic paintings measures 30 by 36 feet.

After numerous revisions to its design, the new building opened September 16, 1966, with the world premiere of Samuel Barber's Antony and Cleopatra.

The theater, while large, is noted for its excellent acoustics. The stage facilities, state of the art when the theater was built, continue to be updated technically and are capable of handling multiple large complex opera productions simultaneously. When the opera company is on hiatus, the Opera House is annually home to the spring season of American Ballet Theatre. It has also hosted visits from other noted opera and ballet companies.

=== Metropolitan Opera House, Philadelphia ===
To provide a home for its regular Tuesday night performances in Philadelphia, the Met purchased an opera house originally built in 1908 by Oscar Hammerstein I, the Philadelphia Opera House at North Broad and Poplar Streets. Renamed the Metropolitan Opera House, the theater was operated by the Met from 1910 until it sold the house in April 1920. The Met debuted at its new Philadelphia home on December 13, 1910, with a performance of Richard Wagner's Tannhäuser starring Leo Slezak and Olive Fremstad.

The Philadelphia Met was designed by noted theater architect William H. McElfatrick and had a seating capacity of approximately 4,000. The theater still stands and currently functions as a church and community arts center.

== Principal conductors ==
In the Met's inaugural season of 1883–1884, Auguste Vianesi, who conducted most of the performances that season including the opening night, was listed in the playbills as "Musical Director and Conductor"; thereafter, the Met did not have another officially designated "music director" until Rafael Kubelík in 1973. However, several of the Met's conductors have assumed more prominent leadership role at different times in the company's history. They set artistic standards and influenced the quality and performance style of the orchestra, but without any official title. The Met has also had many famed guest conductors who are not listed here.

=== Conductors in formal leadership positions ===
- Auguste Vianesi (musical director and conductor, 1883–1884)
- Kurt Adler (chorus master and conductor, 1943–1973)
- Rafael Kubelík (music director, 1973–1974)
- David Stivender (chorus master, 1973–1990)
- James Levine (music director, 1976–2016; artistic director, 1986–2004; music director emeritus, 2016–2017)
- Valery Gergiev (principal guest conductor, 1997–2008)
- Donald Palumbo (chorus master, 2007–2024)
- Fabio Luisi (principal guest conductor, 2010–2011; principal conductor, 2011–2017)
- Yannick Nézet-Séguin (music director, 2018–present)
- Tilman Michael (chorus master, 2024–present)

=== Other conductors of note in company history ===
- Anton Seidl (1885–1897)
- Walter Damrosch (1884–1902)
- Alfred Hertz (1902–1915, leading conductor of German repertory)
- Gustav Mahler (1908–1910)
- Arturo Toscanini (1908–1915, principal conductor)
- Artur Bodanzky (1915–1939, leading conductor of German repertory)
- Gennaro Papi (1916–1927, 1935–1941, leading conductor of Italian repertory)
- Tullio Serafin (1924–1934)
- Fausto Cleva (1931–1971)
- Bruno Walter (1941–1951, 1956, 1959)
- Ettore Panizza (1934–1942, leading conductor of Italian repertory)
- Erich Leinsdorf (1938–1942, leading conductor of German repertory)
- George Szell (1942–1946)
- Cesare Sodero (1942–1947)
- Fritz Busch (1945–1949)
- Max Rudolf (conducting staff 1946–1958, musical administrator 1950–1958)
- Fritz Reiner (1949–1953)
- Dimitri Mitropoulos (1954–1960)
- Erich Leinsdorf (1957–1962)

== Deaths at the Met ==
Over the years, a number of deaths have occurred at the Metropolitan Opera House.

On February 10, 1897, French bass Armand Castelmary suffered a heart attack onstage in the finale of act one of Flotow's Martha. He died in the arms of his friend, tenor Jean de Reszke, after the curtain was brought down. The performance resumed with Giuseppe Cernusco substituting in the role of Sir Tristram.

On May 10, 1935, Herbert Witherspoon, the incoming General Manager suffered a heart attack and died at his desk.

On March 4, 1960, leading baritone Leonard Warren died of a heart attack onstage after completing the aria "Urna fatale" in act two of Verdi's La forza del destino.

On April 30, 1977, Betty Stone, a member of the Met chorus, was killed in an accident offstage during a tour performance of Il trovatore in Cleveland.

On July 23, 1980, Helen Hagnes Mintiks, a 30-year-old Canadian-born violinist, was murdered by Met stagehand Craig Crimmins during the intermission of a performance of the Berlin Ballet. The event was cited by numerous publications as "The Phantom of the Opera" murder. Crimmins was released on parole in August 2021.

On January 5, 1996, tenor Richard Versalle died while playing the role of Vitek during the production of Leoš Janáček's The Makropulos Case. Versalle was climbing a 20-foot (6.1 m) ladder in the opening scene when he suffered a heart attack and fell to the stage.

In addition, several audience members have died at the Met. The most widely known incident was the suicide of operagoer Bantcho Bantchevsky on January 23, 1988, during an intermission in a live broadcast of Verdi's Macbeth.

== Finances and marketing ==
The company's annual operating budget for the 2011–2012 season was $325 million, of which $182 million (43%) comes from private donations. The total potential audience across a season is 800,000 seats. The average audience rate for the 3800-seat theater in 2011 was 79.2%, down from a peak of 88% in 2009. Beyond performing in the opera house in New York, the Met has gradually expanded its audience over the years through technology. It has broadcast regularly on radio since 1931 and on television since 1977. In 2006, the Met began live satellite radio and internet broadcasts as well as live high-definition video transmissions presented in cinemas throughout the world. In 2011, the total HD audience reached 3 million through 1600 theaters worldwide. In 2014, according to Wheeler Winston Dixon, high ticket prices were making it difficult for average people to attend performances. In 2026, The Metropolitan Opera announced massive cuts and layoffs due to financial difficulties.

== Lindemann Young Artist Development Program ==
The Lindemann Young Artist Development Program (LYADP) is a program at the Metropolitan Opera that trains and nurtures the talent of young opera singers, opera conductors, and vocal coaches. Established in 1980 by Levine, it is a separate but complimentary program to the Metropolitan Opera National Council Auditions (MONCA); many of whose winners have become members of the LYDAP. Notable alumni of this program include:

- Norah Amsellem
- Paul Appleby
- Stephanie Blythe
- Vladyslav Buialskyi
- Alyson Cambridge
- Charles Castronovo
- Rihab Chaieb
- Layla Claire
- Sasha Cooke
- Ginger Costa-Jackson
- Dwayne Croft
- Eric Cutler
- Danielle de Niese
- Alexandra Deshorties
- Michelle DeYoung
- Gail Dubinbaum
- Joyce El-Khoury
- Ashley Emerson
- Ying Fang
- Wallis Giunta
- Christine Goerke
- Ryan Speedo Green
- Anthony Dean Griffey
- Paul Groves
- Andrea Gruber
- Nathan Gunn
- Cecelia Hall
- Wendy Bryn Harmer
- Evan Hughes
- Jennifer Johnson Cano
- Seo Jung-hack
- Dawn Kotoski
- Ian Koziara
- Mariusz Kwiecień
- Alexander Lewis
- Kate Lindsey
- Elliot Madore
- Marvis Martin
- Myra Merritt
- Brian Michael Moore
- Aprile Millo
- Erin Morley
- Heidi Grant Murphy
- Stanford Olsen
- Lisette Oropesa
- John Osborn
- Hera Hyesang Park
- Sondra Radvanovsky
- Kirk Redmann
- Morris Robinson
- Natalia Rom
- Samson Setu
- Shenyang
- Donovan Singletary
- Kenneth Tarver
- Russell Thomas
- Dawn Upshaw
- Tichina Vaughn
- Margaret Jane Wray
