= Olin Downes =

American music critic (1886–1955)

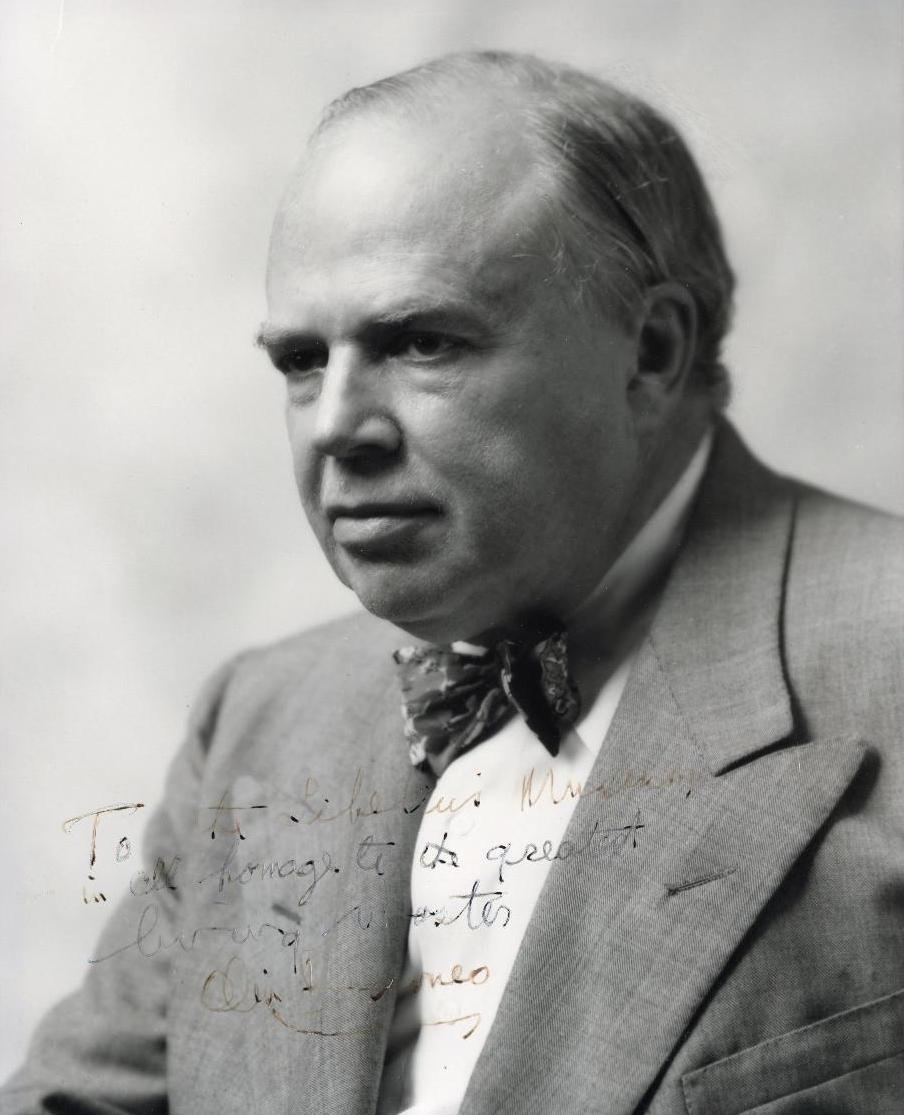
Downes (c. 1950); the caption reads: "To the Sibelius Museum, in all homage to the greatest living master."

Edwin Olin Downes, better known as Olin Downes (January 27, 1886 – August 22, 1955), was an American music critic, known as "Sibelius's Apostle" for his championship of the music of Jean Sibelius. As critic of The New York Times, he exercised considerable influence on musical opinion, although many of his judgments have not stood the test of time.

== Life and works ==
Downes was born in Evanston, Illinois, USA. In New York he studied piano at the National Conservatory of Music of America, and in Boston he studied the piano with Carl Baermann and a range of music subjects with Louis Kelterborn (history and analysis), Homer Norris and Clifford Heilman (music theory) and John P. Marshall (music criticism). It was in those two cities that he made his career as a music critic – first with The Boston Post (1906–1924) and then with The New York Times (1924–1955), where he succeeded Richard Aldrich.

The most conspicuous of Downes's topics was the music of Sibelius, about which he wrote admiringly as early as 1907. He met the composer during the latter's visit to the U.S. in 1914. After becoming critic of The New York Times, Downes sought to counter the prevailing enthusiasm for the music of Stravinsky by inviting Sibelius to make another visit to the U.S., but he could not persuade him to accept the invitation. For his constant proselytizing on Sibelius's behalf, Downes was dubbed "Sibelius's Apostle". In 1937 he was appointed Commander of the Order of the White Rose of Finland, in recognition of his promotion of Sibelius's music. Downes was a guest speaker at Sibelius's 75th birthday celebration in 1940. In addition to scores of articles, Downes published two books on the subject of Sibelius. The first, Sibelius (1945), was published in Finnish only: a collection of Downes's articles on the subject translated by Paul Sjöblom. The other, Sibelius the Symphonist (1956), was Downes's last book, published posthumously. In addition to his campaigning for Sibelius, Downes, according to Baker's Biographical Dictionary of Musicians, did much to advance the cause of other 20th-century composers, including Richard Strauss, Prokofiev, and Shostakovich in the U.S.

Grove's Dictionary of Music and Musicians says of Downes that his reviews "strongly influenced contemporary popular musical opinion in the USA" although "the taste defined in them has dated". He disparaged many composers later held in general esteem, ranging from the romantic to the atonal, including Mahler, Elgar, Webern and Berg. Of Elgar's music he wrote, "it reflects the complacency and stodginess of the era of the antimacassar and pork-pie bonnets; it is affected by the poor taste and the swollen orchestral manner of the post-romantics". He dismissed Webern's Symphony as "one of those whispering, clucking, picking little pieces which Webern composes when he whittles away at small and futile ideas, until he has achieved the perfect fruition of futility and written precisely nothing." Downes opined that Webern's music did not matter, and that the music of Louis Gruenberg was more important. With performers, too, Downes was strongly partisan.

In the 1930s his constant praise of conductor Arturo Toscanini and denigration of John Barbirolli, Toscanini's successor as music director of the New York Philharmonic, prompted protest, with Downes's "constantly repeated line of hocus-pocus" condemned as "thoroughly nauseating".

From the 1930s to the 1950s, Downes was the chairman of the Metropolitan Opera Quiz, a radio broadcast during the intervals of the Metropolitan Opera's Saturday afternoon live relays. This position was later taken by his son, musicologist Edward O. D. Downes.

The Cincinnati Conservatory of Music awarded Downes an honorary doctorate in 1939. His papers, housed at the University of Georgia, include about 50,000 letters to and from composers, musicologists, performers and critics.

Downes died in New York City at the age of 69.

== Publications ==
- The lure of music: depicting the human side of great composers, with stories of their inspired creations. New York: Harper & Bros., 1918.
- Symphonic broadcasts. New York: L. MacVeagh, 1931.
- Symphonic masterpieces. New York: Dial Press, 1935.
- A treasury of American song (with Elie Siegmeister). New York : A.A. Knopf, 1943.
- Sibelius (in Finnish, translated by Paul Sjöblom). Helsinki: Otava, 1945.
- Ten Operatic Masterpieces (with Alberta Sordini and Lonard Marker). New York: Broadcast Music Inc.; G. Ricordi & Co.; Charles Scribner's Sons, 1952.
- Sibelius the Symphonist. New York: Philharmonic-Symphony Society of New York, 1956.
- Olin Downes on Music; a selection from his writings during the half-century 1906 to 1955. New York: Simon and Schuster, 1957.
