= Metropolitan Opera radio broadcasts =

Broadcasts of opera performances from the Metropolitan Opera in New York City

Metropolitan Opera
- Genre: full-length live opera performances
- Running time: 3.5 to 4 hours, weekly
- Country of origin: United States
- Languages: English (Spanish in selected countries)
- Syndicates: 300+ U.S. stations Stations in 40 countries Sirius XM Satellite Radio
- Announcer: Milton Cross (1931–1975); Peter Allen (1975–2004); Margaret Juntwait (2004–2014); Mary Jo Heath (2015–2021); Debra Lew Harder (2021–present)
- Recording studio: Metropolitan Opera
- Original release: 1931 – present
- No. of series: 80+
- No. of episodes: 1,500+
- Website: www.metopera.org/season/radio/

The Metropolitan Opera radio broadcasts are a regular series of weekly broadcasts on network radio of full-length opera performances. They are transmitted live from the stage of the Metropolitan Opera in New York City. The Metropolitan Opera International Radio Network airs the live performances on Saturday afternoons while the Met is in season, typically beginning the first Saturday in December, and totaling just over 20 weekly performances through early May. The Met broadcasts are the longest-running continuous classical music program in radio history, and the series has won several Peabody Awards for excellence in broadcasting.

The series is currently broadcast on over 300 stations in the United States, and stations in 40 countries on 5 continents. These countries include Canada, Mexico, 27 European countries, Australia, New Zealand, Argentina, Brazil, Ecuador, Mexico, Peru, Uruguay, China, and Japan. The broadcasts are also listenable online via streaming audio; and select broadcasts and excerpts are listenable year-round on the "Met Opera on Demand" service and the free online service Rhapsody.

== History ==
The Met's radio broadcast history dates back to 1910, when radio pioneer Lee De Forest transmitted — experimentally, with erratic signal — two live partial performances from the stage of the Met, which were reportedly heard as far away as Newark, New Jersey. The first of these was a performance of Acts II and III of Tosca on January 12, 1910, starring Antonio Scotti as Scarpia. The following evening, January 13, 1910, parts of Pagliacci starring Enrico Caruso were broadcast.

The first network broadcast was heard on Friday, December 25, 1931: a performance of Engelbert Humperdinck's Hänsel und Gretel. The series was created as the Met, financially endangered in the early years of the Great Depression, sought to enlarge its audience and support through national exposure on network radio. In the first broadcast season only Hänsel und Gretel and Das Rheingold (February 26, 1932) were presented in their entirety; most operas were only heard partially. From the start of the 1933-34 season, complete opera broadcasts became the norm. Since 1931 most broadcasts have been of Saturday matinee performances, with only a handful of exceptions such as the opening night of the new Met, which featured a broadcast of Samuel Barber's Antony and Cleopatra on Friday September 16, 1966.

The live radio broadcasts were originally heard on NBC, and became a staple of its Blue Network. Starting in 1944 the series continued on the Blue Network's successor, ABC, through 1958. It won a Peabody Award in 1950. From 1958 to 1960 the series was broadcast on CBS. As network radio waned with the rise of television, the Met founded its own independent Metropolitan Opera Radio Network in 1960, which is now heard on radio stations around the world. The broadcasts won their second Peabody in 1960, their third in 1982 (shared with Live from the Metropolitan Opera) and their fourth in 1989. The Met's first live closed-circuit television transmission was Carmen with Rise Stevens, sent to 31 movie theaters in 27 US cities on December 11, 1952.

In Canada the live broadcasts have been heard since December 1933, first on the Canadian Radio Broadcasting Commission. Since 1934 they have been heard on the CRBC's successor, the Canadian Broadcasting Corporation, where they currently air on CBC Radio 2 on Saturday Afternoon at the Opera and on the CBC's French music network, Ici Musique on Place à l'Opéra.

In the late 1930s and early 1940s the broadcasts were transmitted live via shortwave to Latin America over the NBC White Network. Transcription discs made by NBC were also sent to Latin America for relay over local radio stations in much better quality. Some of these discs survive. Spanish commentary and intermission features were inserted for Spanish-speaking countries, and Portuguese for Brazil.

In December 1990, the broadcast series expanded its transmission to include Europe, via satellite transmission and the European Broadcasting Union. Australia and New Zealand joined the network in the late 1990s; Brazil and Mexico in 1999. Uruguay, Ecuador, and Japan joined in 2000.

Technical quality of the broadcasts steadily improved over the years. FM broadcasts were added in the 1950s, transmitted to stations via telephone lines. With the arrival of the 1973-74 broadcasting season (December 1973), all broadcasts were offered in FM stereo. Satellite technology later allowed uniformly excellent broadcast sound to be sent live worldwide.

== Sponsors ==
Financing the Met broadcasts during the Depression years of the 1930s proved to be problematic, moving between NBC, the American Tobacco Company, the Lambert Pharmaceutical Company, and RCA (then NBC’s parent company).

Sponsorship of the Saturday afternoon broadcasts by The Texas Company (Texaco) began on December 7, 1940, with a performance of Mozart's Le nozze di Figaro. Texaco's support continued for 63 years, the longest continuous sponsorship in broadcast history, and also included the early PBS television broadcasts. After its merger with Chevron, however, the combined company ChevronTexaco ended its sponsorship of the Met's radio network in April 2004. Emergency grants allowed the broadcasts to continue through 2005, whereupon homebuilding company Toll Brothers became the primary sponsor until June 10, 2023. Since December 9, 2023, The Robert K. Johnson Foundation is the sponsor.

Additional support for the broadcasts also comes from the Annenberg Foundation, the Vincent A. Stabile Endowment for Broadcast Media, and contributions from listeners around the world.

== Announcers ==
In nine decades of its Saturday broadcasts, the Met has been introduced by the voices of only five permanent announcers. NBC announcer Milton Cross served for 43 seasons, from the inaugural 1931 broadcast until his death in 1975. He was succeeded by Peter Allen, who presided for 29 years through the 2003–04 season. Margaret Juntwait began her tenure as host the following season. From September 2006 through December 2014, Juntwait also served as host for all of the live and recorded broadcasts on the Met's SiriusXM satellite radio channel, Metropolitan Opera Radio. Following her ninth season in the job, Juntwait died from cancer in June 2015. Met Opera radio producer Mary Jo Heath, who filled in for Juntwait in 2015, became the new permanent host starting with the 2015–2016 season. Heath retired in 2021. On September 21, 2021, Debra Lew Harder was announced as the new host of the broadcasts.

Opera singer and director Ira Siff has for several years been the background commentator, working alongside Juntwait and Heath. Other announcers have included veteran classical music announcer Lloyd Moss, who twice substituted for Milton Cross, Robert Woldrop, who did two broadcasts in 1937, and Deems Taylor, who was heard briefly as co-host during the early years. Author William Berger was heard occasionally as a commentator along with Juntwait.

The announcer introduces each broadcast with cast information and background about the week's opera, and then introduces each act with a plot summary. Since 2006, the announcer has been joined by a commentator who adds additional background information and personal observations to the conversation.

== Intermission features ==
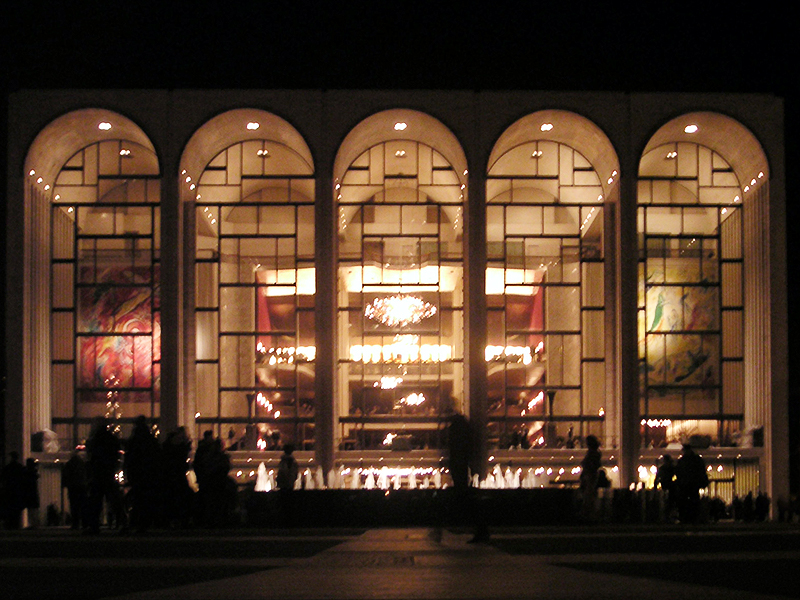
The Metropolitan Opera House at Lincoln Center

Because live opera includes lengthy intermissions between multiple acts, the Metropolitan Opera radio broadcasts offer informative and entertaining opera-related intermission features. These include discussions of the opera being performed, roundtables, quizzes, interviews with various current and retired opera performers, and information on notable behind-the-scenes Met staff members. Since 2006, the lead singers of the day's opera have also been interviewed live as they leave the stage. Starting in December 2009, a new feature called Talking Opera explains various terminology used in the opera world.

Among the most popular intermission features is the Opera Quiz. The quiz is usually about 20 minutes long and features a host asking a panel of three experts questions about opera which have been submitted by listeners. First introduced on December 7, 1940 as the Opera Question Forum, the Quiz was originally hosted by Milton Cross. Robert Lawrence was the Quiz host in the 1941/42 season. The 1942/43 broadcast season began with Robert Lawrence alternating with Olin Downes but in January 1943 Olin Downes became the steady Quiz host and remained until 1948. For the next ten years, the Quiz hosts were Robert Lawrence, Sigmund Spaeth, Boris Goldovsky, Deems Taylor, and Jay Harrison. From 1958 to 1996, the host was Edward Downes, Olin's son. During this time the quiz became more relaxed and featured humor and banter among the panelists as well as informative answers. Frequent guest panelists during Edward Downes's tenure as host included actors Tony Randall and Walter Slezak in addition to well-known musicians and critics including Alberta Masiello, a Met staff musical coach. Since the death of Edward Downes, the host chair has been occupied by guest quizmasters, among whom have recently been leading Met singers. During the years that the broadcasts were sponsored by Texaco, listeners whose questions were used on air were awarded gifts that usually included opera recordings and a portable radio.

Other intermission features over the years have included Opera News on the Air, the Singers’ Roundtable, and annual interviews with the Metropolitan Opera’s general managers. Boris Goldovsky, an opera producer and lecturer known for making opera more accessible to audiences, hosted a series of musical lectures from 1946 to the mid-1980s. Analyzing the opera being performed that day, he spoke and played the piano, illustrating his comments with musical excerpts.

Commentators for the various intermission segments during the Met broadcasts have also included Marcia Davenport who appeared weekly in the 1930s, author and radio host George Jellinek, music historian and translator William Weaver, opera critic Speight Jenkins, opera historian Alan Wagner, playwright Terrence McNally, and classics scholar Father Owen Lee.

== Peabody Awards ==
The Metropolitan Opera radio broadcasts have won over 60 awards, including multiple Peabody Awards, the highest honor in radio broadcasting.

In 1950, the Metropolitan Opera, ABC Radio, and the Texas Company (Texaco, the series' long-term sponsor) were awarded the Peabody Award in music for "public service in making the most brilliant opera company in the world a by-word in millions of homes." The announcement commended the "great artists," the "superlative orchestra," and the intermission features, as well as the series' spin-off programs such as the Auditions of the Air and the Opera Album.

In 1954, the Peabody committee gave a Personal Award for Radio Music to Boris Goldovsky, via the Metropolitan Opera radio broadcasts. The Peabody announcement noted Goldovsky's contagious enthusiasm for opera, evident in his decade of hosting intermission features and interviews on the Met broadcast series.

In 1960, the Texaco-Metropolitan Opera Network was awarded a Peabody Institutional Award for Radio Public Service. The Peabody committee cited 20 years of public service "of inestimable cultural value," and mentioned the carefully planned intermission programs and high-level music commentary. The committee also noted the "long-time excellence of this series, the good taste and restraint in the commercial identification," and the international use of the broadcasts.

In 1982, Texaco and the Metropolitan Opera were awarded a Peabody for excellence in both radio and television broadcasting. The Peabody committee cited the more than four decades of radio broadcasts, the continued technical refinements and improvements in sound, and the "informative intermission features, intelligent narration, and outstanding musical quality."

In 1989, its 50th year of broadcasting, the Texaco-Metropolitan Opera radio series received another Peabody Award. The committee noted that "the Met Opera has been continually innovative in its presentation. Sound quality is excellent, performances are first-rate, and the entertaining intermissions have become outstanding programs in their own right."

== Simulcasts and beyond ==
In conjunction with the live radio broadcasts, a series of live television broadcasts from the stage of the Metropolitan Opera, called Live from the Metropolitan Opera, began in 1977. These live broadcasts, aired on PBS, were called simulcasts, as they were broadcast simultaneously by both a television station and an FM stereo radio station in the same geographic areas. Through these simulcasts, listeners were able to hear the operas in stereo, which was then unavailable on television. The first simulcast, La Bohème, featured Luciano Pavarotti as Rodolfo and Renata Scotto as Mimi, with James Levine conducting, and all three were interviewed during the intermission. In 1988, the television program title was changed to The Metropolitan Opera Presents, to accommodate the fact that the performances at that point were often taped prior to broadcast, although for a few years thereafter they were still sometimes live and simulcast on the radio.

On December 30, 2006, the Met expanded its live broadcast series tradition by premiering the Metropolitan Opera Live in HD series, which transmits live Met performances in high definition video to select movie theaters and other venues across the U.S. and other parts of the world. These broadcasts are usually also aired on television several months later on the new PBS series, Great Performances at the Met.

== Listening options ==
The live Metropolitan Opera radio broadcasts are listenable every Saturday during its broadcast season, which typically runs from early December through the early May. These broadcasts may be accessed via hundreds of radio stations worldwide (the official website provides a station finder), or via free live streaming Internet transmission on the Allegro site and elsewhere.

Historical broadcasts are archived and available to the public at the New York Public Library's Rodgers and Hammerstein Archive of Recorded Sound, located at the Library for the Performing Arts in Lincoln Center, New York. The archive houses almost all of the broadcasts that have been recorded, from 1937 through the present, and may be accessed by patrons on a walk-in basis.

Year round, online archived video and audio of hundreds of archived complete operas and excerpts are available via the opera's "Met Player", now renamed "Met Opera on Demand", which is also available as an iPad app. Hundreds of archived audio operas and selections are now also available on Rhapsody, an online music service which offers free listening and downloads for payment.

The Met's performances may be heard also on the Metropolitan Opera Radio channel on Sirius XM Radio, launched in 2006. The channel airs two or three live broadcasts from the Metropolitan Opera each week during the opera season as well as complete operas from among the 1,500 recorded broadcasts in the Metropolitan Opera archives. The channel's host and announcer is Mary Jo Heath who took over in 2015 after the death of Margaret Juntwait, and William Berger has been the writer and commentator.

The Met's official site provides complete composer and background information, detailed plot summaries, and cast and characters for all current and upcoming opera broadcasts, as well as for every opera broadcast since 2000. In addition, the Met's online archive provides links to all Rhapsody, Sirius XM, and Met Player operas, with complete program and cast information. The online archive also provides an exhaustive searchable list of every performance and performer in the Metropolitan Opera's history.

== See also ==
- Metropolitan Opera
- Metropolitan Opera Radio (Sirius XM)
- Live from the Metropolitan Opera
- Metropolitan Opera Live in HD
