= Vladyslav Buialskyi =

Ukrainian bass-baritone

- Владислав Буяльський
- Born: 15 August 1997 (age 28); Berdiansk, Ukraine
- Education: Kyiv Conservatory
- Occupation: Operatic bass-baritone
- Years active: 2018–present

Vladyslav Buialskyi (Ukrainian: Владислав Буяльський; born 15 August 1997) is a Ukrainian bass-baritone. Since 2020, he has performed with the Metropolitan Opera as a member of its Lindemann Young Artist Development Program.

== Biography ==
Buialskyi was born on 15 August 1997 in Berdiansk, Ukraine. The son of an accountant and a driver, he became interested in singing at an early age and admired the Soviet singer Muslim Magomayev. When he was 17 years old, he began training at a conservatory. He is an alumnus of the R. Glier Kyiv Institute of Music and the Kyiv Conservatory, where he trained with the baritone Mykola Koval.

His participation in "Kharkiv Assemblies", the International Competition of Musical Art, in Kharkiv in 2018, led to a performance as Leporello in Mozart's Don Giovanni at the Kharkiv National Academic Opera and Ballet Theatre. Buialskyi sang at several competitions in 2019, becoming the inaugural recipient of the Brian Dickie Young Talent Award at Neue Stimmen. He was named a semi-finalist and finalist at the International Stanisław Moniuszko Vocal Competition in Warsaw and the Tenor Viñas Contest in Barcelona, respectively, and received the "Accademia Chigiana" prize at the latter. He was also a semi-finalist at the 2021 Operalia competition and a finalist at the 2021 Éva Marton International Singing Competition.

In 2020, Buialskyi joined the Metropolitan Opera in New York City as a participant in its Lindemann Young Artist Development Program. He made his debut with the Met on 28 February 2022, playing a Flemish deputy in Verdi's Don Carlos. Before the start of the opera, Buialskyi and the other singers performed the State Anthem of Ukraine in response to the Russian invasion of Ukraine. His performance, standing center stage with his hand over his heart and as the only singer without carrying a score, was praised by music critics and later broadcast by Ukrainian media outlets. On 14 March 2022, Buialskyi sang the anthem as a soloist with the Met Orchestra and chorus to open the 90-minute benefit concert "A Concert for Ukraine". The New York Times described him as "a symbol of his country’s struggles".

In 2022, he also played the Captain in the Met's production of Tchaikovsky's Eugene Onegin. Zachary Woolfe of The New York Times wrote that despite the brevity of the role, Buialskyi's performance was "as indelible as any artist on the Met's roster". Rick Perdian of the New York Classical Review also praised his performance, writing that he "sang with verve and danced with style".
