= Edward Downes (American musicologist) =

American radio personality

- Born: Edward Olin Davenport Downes; August 12, 1911; West Roxbury, Massachusetts, US
- Died: December 26, 2001 (aged 90); Manhattan, New York, US
- Education: Trinity School; Dalton School; Columbia University; Manhattan School of Music; University of Paris; Ludwig-Maximilians-Universität München (LMU); Harvard University
- Employer(s): Metropolitan Opera International Radio Network; The New York Times; The New York Post; The Boston Evening Transcript; National Broadcasting Company; New York Philharmonic; University of Minnesota; Harvard University; Queens College
- Known for: Quizmaster of the Metropolitan Opera radio broadcasts

Edward Olin Davenport Downes (August 12, 1911 – December 26, 2001) was an American musicologist, professor, radio personality, and music critic. He was the host of the Texaco Opera Quiz on the Metropolitan Opera radio broadcasts for nearly forty years. These broadcasts were heard across North America and Europe.

== Early life ==
Downes was born in West Roxbury, Massachusetts. He was the son of Marian Davenport and Olin Downes, a pianist and chief music critic for The Boston Post. His mother was from a prominent Boston family and received a patent for her invention that combined a child’s toy with a record changer. His father's original surname was Quigley, but this was changed after Downes' grandfather, Edwin Quigley, was sentenced to sixteen years in prison in band fraud in 1895.

Music was a daily topic when Downes was a child. He attended operas with his father as a young child in Boston, becoming an "ardent Wagnerite with a passion for Siegfried" by the time he was nine years old. However, his father resigned his position with The Boston Post over boredom and issues such as being asked to write a positive review for the girlfriend of the paper's manager. Fortunately, a letter came in the mail, with the offer of a new job ten days later.

Downes was twelve-years-old when his family moved to New York City in 1925 for his father's new job as the chief music critic for The New York Times. They lived in The Dakota apartment building near Central Park. In New York, his father became the most influential music critic in the United States for thirty years. His father was also the quizmaster for the Metropolitan Opera radio broadcasts, from 1940 until his death in 1955.

Downes attended Trinity School and the Dalton School in New York City. The summer of 1930 before graduating from high school, he traveled to Germany to hear family friend Arturo Toscanini's debut at the annual Bayreuth Festival in Germany and to visit the Bayreuth Festspielhaus which was designed by Richard Wagner. Although the Nazi Party was coming into power, and Jews were starting to be arrested, Downes felt safe in Germany because he was an American and his father wrote for The New York Times. He would return to Germany for the festival in 1932 through 1936 with his father. Downes said, "The last pre-war memory I have of Bayreuth was in 1936, fairly late in the day when Hitler was a regular visitor. I did see him there... If I had wanted to meet Hitler, it would have been possible with my father’s connections. The authorities were well aware of the advantages The New York Times could bring them."

Rather than completing high school, he enrolled in Columbia University in 1930. While there, he was a member of the fraternity of St. Anthony Hall. After a year, he transferred to the Manhattan School of Music. Then, he studied languages at the University of Paris for a year, followed by the Ludwig-Maximilians-Universität München for four years of art, theatrical history, and romance languages—however, he never completed a degree. Downes said, "I didn't see why I needed one. I wound up working as a journalist and teaching in colleges, and I didn't even have a high school diploma." However, he was also ordered home by his father because World War II.

Downes enlisted in the U.S. Army during World War II, but was "opted out" in 1942 because of poor eyesight. He worked for Arthur M. Schlesinger Jr., preparing briefing books for the Office of Strategic Services. Downes said, "They needed someone who could write fast, who knew languages, and could scan quickly a large amount of intelligence material and newspapers." He ultimately left what would become the CIA with an honorable discharge because he felt he lacked knowledge of international politics, history, and economics which were also essential in the long term.

He decided to attend Harvard University in 1947. In 1958, he received his first degree, a PhD in musicology from Harvard University, when he was 47 years old. His dissertation was on The Operas of Johann Christian Bach as a Reflection of the Dominant Trends in Opera Serial: 1750-1780.

== Career ==
Downes began his career in music as the assistant music critic of The New York Post, covering music festivals in Bayreuth and Salzburg for a year. While living in Europe, he also was a foreign music correspondent for The New York Times. On September 30, 1939, he became the music critic of The Boston Evening Transcript, working there until the paper ceased publication in 1941. His salary was $2,300 a year for a weekly Sunday "think piece" and reviews of all concerts. He was also an assistant musical director for the National Broadcasting Company (NBC). In 1941, he joined the staff of the Columbia Broadcasting System (CBS) affiliate W67NY.

In 1952, Downes taught at the University of Minnesota for five years. In 1955, after his father died, Downes took his slot as the music critic for The New York Times. After he left Minnesota, he moved back to New York City and was also a researcher at Queens College.

In 1958, Downes received an offer from the Metropolitan Opera International Radio Network to become the quizmaster of the Metropolitan Opera radio broadcasts for twenty weeks a year, for the same salary that he received as a newspaper music critic for an entire year's work. He left The New York Times and became the host of the Texaco Opera Quiz from 1958 to 1996, overseeing some 800 live broadcasts. Downes said, “The quiz was decidedly a side issue when I took it up. We used to call it 'sugar-coated education.'" His job was not just quizzing the guest panelists, but also researching and preparing the answers to questions submitted by listeners. These broadcasts were heard through 325 radio stations in North America and 26 countries in Europe. Michael Bronson, a producer of the broadcasts said, "I sometimes think Edward doesn't realize how well he accomplished the mission of the intermission features: to be informative and entertaining. His avuncular style, his way of putting the panelists and audiences at ease demystified opera." On a few occasions, Downes served as a panelist and answered questions supplied by a guest host. He also hosted a weekly radio show called First Hearing. He retired from broadcasting after the 1997–98 season.

Starting in 1959, he taught master classes for Friedelind Wagner at the Bayreuth Festival. However, in 1965 he "resigned over Friedelind’s lack of organizational skills, poor resources, lost luggage and sluggish paychecks." Nevertheless, he was known as the musicologist-in-residence for the Bayreuth Festival.

From 1960 to 1978, he wrote the program notes for the New York Philharmonic. He also lectured at the Metropolitan Museum of Art on cultural history.

Downes taught at Wellesley College, the Longy School of Music, Juilliard School and Harvard University. He was a professor at Queens College from 1966 to 1983, teaching the history of music.

His papers are housed at the Howard Gottlieb Research Library at Boston University.

== Personal life ==
Downes married Mildred Gignoux Fincke of New York City on October 23, 1943. She was the daughter of Robert Miles Gignoux of San Francisco and had an M.A. from Columbia University. She had a daughter from her previous marriage to William Manne Fincke—who she had divorced. Downes and Mildred also divorced in 1954.

In 2001, Downes died at his home in The Dakota in Manhattan, New York at the age of 90.

== Selected works ==
=== As author: ===
- The New York Philharmonic Guide to the Symphony. Walker & Company, 1976. ISBN 0-8027-0540-5

=== As editor: ===
- Perspectives in Musicology: The Inaugural Lectures of the Ph.D. Program in Music at the City University of New York. Edited by Barry S. Brook, Edward O. D. Downes, and Sherman Van Solkema. New York: W.W. Norton, 1972. ISBN 0-393-09952-0

=== As translator: ===
- Shostakovich, Dmitri. Katerina Ismailova. New York: Leeds Music, 1963. ISBN 0949697060
- Verdi, The Man in his Letters, as edited and selected by Franz Werfel and Paul Stefan. Vienna House, Inc., 1973, ISBN 978-0844300887
- Janáček, Leos. Jenufa. Australia: Pellinor Pty Ltd., 1984
