= Auguste Vianesi =

Auguste Charles Léonard François Vianesi (2 November 1837 – 4 November 1908) was an opera conductor, born in the Austrian Empire and later naturalised French. His repertoire consisted mostly of French and Italian opera, in which he directed some of the world's great singers including Pauline Viardot, Christina Nilsson, Marcella Sembrich, the brothers Edouard and Jean de Reszke, and Feodor Chaliapin in the opera houses of London, Paris, Melbourne, St. Petersburg, Boston and New York. He retired around the time when sound recording became commercially available, and he seems not to have left any recorded legacy.

== Life ==
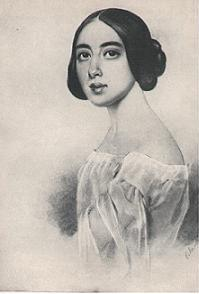
Pauline Viardot

He was born in Legnano, (Note: Some sources say Livorno, possibly confused by 'Leghorn', its English translation.) northern Italy. His father was probably named either Giovanni or Augusto. (Note: In 1847 a Giovanni Vianesi was maestro concertatore (ie music director) at the Teatro Regio, Parma: a bass singer also named Augusto Vianesi appeared in various solo roles there in November 1844.) He studied music on the advice of Giovanni Pacini and Theodor Döhler. In 1857, he went to Paris to complete his musical training, armed with a letter of introduction to Rossini from the famed soprano Giuditta Pasta. His first professional engagement was in London at the Theatre Royal (1858–9). He also toured Britain with Pauline Viardot, including Verdi's Macbeth in Manchester with some locally engaged women for the role of the witches who had only acted in Shakespeare's play with music, and knew not a word of Italian or a note of Verdi's music. They were dismissed at the rehearsal and replaced by the (heavily disguised) prompter and a couple of orchestral musicians.

Vianesi held further conducting positions in New York the same year (1858–9), Moscow (1863–4) and St Petersburg (1867–9). Returning to London, he conducted the Italian Opera for ten years at the Covent Garden Royal Opera House from 1870 to 1880 under Frederick Gye, with a season at the Théâtre Lyrique in Paris in 1873. He conducted the first London performances of Lohengrin (1875), Tannhäuser (1876), Gomes' Il Guarany (1872), and Massenet's Le roi de Lahore in 1879. He toured widely in Britain with the Covent Garden Italian Opera company.

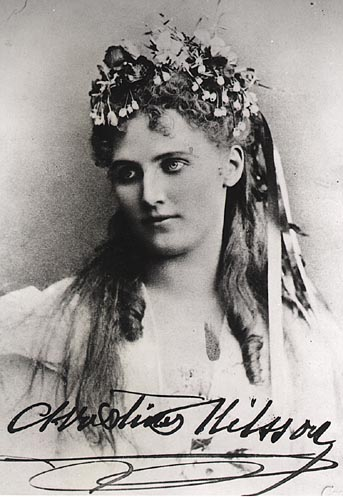
Christina Nilsson

He directed the very first season (1883–4) of the New York Metropolitan Opera House ("the old Met") under the management of Abbey, Schoeffel and Grau. The house opened on 22 October 1883 with Faust with Italo Campanini, Christine Nilsson and Sofia Scalchi. The second night featured Marcella Sembrich in Lucia. The season was a critical success but a financial disaster.

In 1885 he became a naturalized French citizen, and two years later was appointed to succeed Ernest Altès as chief conductor of the Paris Opera at the Palais Garnier (1887–91). He conducted Messiah (in the Mozart arrangement) at the 1889 Paris World's Fair, with Fauré at the organ. This performance was not particularly well-reviewed. He also directed first performances of Saint-Saëns's Ascanio (1890) and Jules Massenet's Le mage (1891).

He returned to New York in 1891/92 with Abbey, Schoeffel & Grau when they took over the Metropolitan Opera for the second time, including the US premiere of Gluck's Orfeo ed Euridice (probably with Giulia and Sofia Ravogli). In Chicago at the Auditorium Theatre on 9 November 1891 with Abbey and Grau's Opera company from the Met and the Chicago Symphony Orchestra, he directed the American debuts of Emma Eames, Gulia Ravogli, Édouard de Reszke, and his brother Jean in the title role of Lohengrin.

He taught singing in New York from 1892 onwards, and directed a season of opera in New Orleans in 1899/1900.

He died in New York City on 4 November 1908, two days after his 71st birthday.

== Works ==
Aged 20, he wrote a comic opera, Una fortuna in prigione (A Fortune in Prison), which was finished in London on 20 October 1858. An index card from the Italian National Catalogue of Manuscripts indicates the libretto was by A. Codebò. It may be based on a translation of the 2-act comedy of the same name by Jean-François Bayard and Charles Lafont (1809–1864). (Note: Source for Charles Lafont's identity: in prigione: "Una fortuna in prigione commedia in due atti"... (in Italian). Dizio. Retrieved 16 May 2017.) (Note: A manuscript score of Vianesi's opera (probably autograph), signed London, 20 October 1858, was listed in Liepmannssohn's catalogue 185, no.1236.)

== Family life ==
He seems to have divorced his wife Maria, née Henderson, in England in 1875, during his time at Covent Garden.
