= Debra Lew Harder =

American pianist and radio announcer

Debra Lew Harder (born 1960 or 1961) is an American pianist and radio announcer and host of the Metropolitan Opera radio broadcasts. Harder was named as the fifth host of the broadcasts in 2021, succeeding the retiring Mary Jo Heath.

Harder was previously an announcer for classical music on radio station WRTI in Philadelphia, Pennsylvania.

== Biography ==
Debra Miyoung Lew was born to South Korean parents in Burlington, Vermont, in 1960 or 1961. She was raised in northeast Ohio and is a 1979 graduate of Western Reserve Academy. She studied the piano starting when she was six years old, and she was successful in music competitions growing up. She graduated from Kent State University with a bachelor's degree and she earned a Doctor of Medicine at the Northeastern Ohio Universities College of Medicine (now Northeast Ohio Medical University) in 1985. She studied under pianist Tung Kwong-Kwong while at Kent State University. After practicing emergency medicine in central Ohio for a few years, she decided to pursue a career in music. She began attending Ohio State University in 1988 to study under pianist and artist-in-residence Earl Wild, and she earned a Doctor of Musical Arts in 1994. Through her career, she gave performances at venues such as the Dame Myra Hess Memorial Concert Series at the Chicago Cultural Center, Verizon Hall in the Kimmel Center for the Performing Arts in Philadelphia, and Wigmore Hall in London.

Harder later moved to Philadelphia, where she shifted to mainly teaching music rather than performing, and she served on the faculties of Haverford College and Bryn Mawr College. She was host of the classical music programs on local radio station WRTI from 2016 to 2021. In 2021, she was named as the new host of the Metropolitan Opera radio broadcasts, taking the place of the retiring Mary Jo Heath. Harder is the fifth person in 95 years to hold the job since the radio broadcasts began in 1931.

== Personal life ==
In 1985, she married Thomas Harder. He is a physician. They have two children.
