= Sofia Scalchi =

Italian opera singer

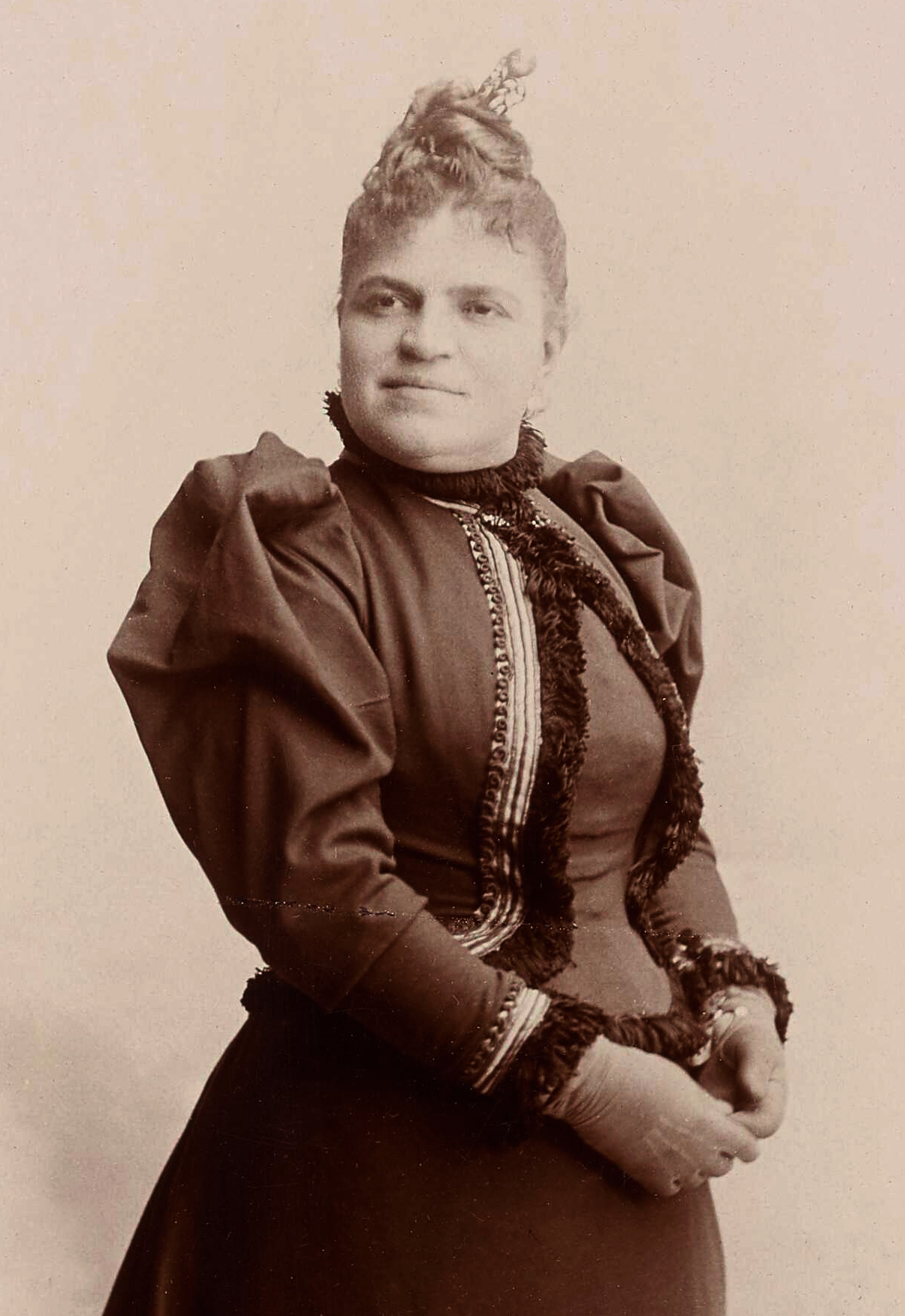
- Scalchi, c. 1892 (Newberry Library, Chicago)
- Born: November 29, 1850; Turin
- Died: August 22, 1922 (aged 71); Rome
- Occupation: Opera singer
- Spouse: Luigi Alberto Lolli

Sofia Scalchi (November 29, 1850 – August 22, 1922) was an Italian operatic contralto who could also sing in the mezzo-soprano range. Her career was international, and she appeared at leading theatres in both Europe and America.

== Singing career ==
Born in Turin in 1850, Scalchi studied voice with Augusta Boccabadati. In 1866, she made her stage debut in Mantua as Ulrica in Giuseppe Verdi's Un ballo in maschera.

Her first major international success came at the Royal Opera House, Covent Garden, where on November 5, 1868, she made her London debut as Azucena in Il trovatore, also by Verdi. She appeared with the Covent Garden company thereafter until 1890, performing most of the standard lower-pitched female operatic roles. These included Urbain, Amneris and Arsarce, among others. Meanwhile, in 1882-83, she toured the United States for the first time, singing on that occasion with Mapleson's company.

Scalchi helped to make history when she sang in the newly constructed New York City Metropolitan Opera's first ever staged work, Charles Gounod's Faust, which inaugurated the theatre on October 22, 1883. She returned to Mapleson's troupe a year later but went back to the Metropolitan in 1891, where she would spend five further seasons.

Scalchi created no significant new operatic roles during her long stint at Covent Garden. She did, however, take part in a number of important American premieres, including those of Verdi's last two masterpieces, Otello and Falstaff. She appeared, too, in the initial American productions of Amilcare Ponchielli's La Gioconda and Umberto Giordano's Andrea Chénier. Scalchi retired from the Met in 1896 and formed her own private company of singers a year later, which then undertook a final American tour.

Commentators praised Scalchi during her prime for the strength, wide range and remarkable agility of her voice, although she was said to have possessed distinct breaks between each of her registers. She never made any gramophone records. Her death occurred in Rome in 1922.

== Personal life ==
In 1875–76 she wed Count Luigi Alberto Lolli, an aristocrat from Ferrara, thus becoming the Countess Lolli. After her marriage, she was often addressed privately and billed publicly on theatrical posters or programs as "Sofia Scalchi-Lolli."
