= Met Gala (opera) =

Formal event hosted by the Metropolitan Opera, New York City

A Metropolitan Opera Gala or simply a Met Gala is a formal event hosted by the Metropolitan Opera. The Met frequently stages "Gala" events in which it celebrates the talents of its top performers.

== See also ==
- The Metropolitan Opera Centennial Gala (1983)
- The Metropolitan Opera Gala 1991
- James Levine's 25th Anniversary Metropolitan Opera Gala (1996)
