= Margaret Juntwait =

American radio announcer

- Born: March 18, 1957; Ridgewood, New Jersey, U.S.
- Died: June 3, 2015 (aged 58); Saddle River, New Jersey, U.S.
- Occupation: Radio broadcaster
- Years active: 1991–2015
- Employers: WNYC (1991–2004); Metropolitan Opera (2004–2015)
- Spouse: Jamie Katz
- Children: 3

Margaret Ann Juntwait (March 18, 1957 – June 3, 2015) was an American radio broadcaster, best known as the announcer of the Metropolitan Opera radio broadcasts. After thirteen years on the air at WNYC-Radio, she debuted as the Met's announcer on December 11, 2004. She was also the Met's first announcer on Sirius XM Satellite Radio from 2006, and remained in both jobs until her death in 2015.

== Early years ==
Raised in Ridgewood and Upper Saddle River, New Jersey, Juntwait attended Northern Highlands Regional High School, where she first developed an interest in choral music. Later, she studied to be an opera singer – she was a lyric soprano – and earned a degree in voice from the Manhattan School of Music in 1980. After marrying, she withdrew from an operatic career in favor of raising her three children.

== Broadcasting career ==
Juntwait began her career as a classical music radio announcer in 1991 at WNYC-FM radio in New York City.

In 2000, while continuing at WNYC, she began her Metropolitan Opera career as the back-up announcer for radio host Peter Allen, who retired from the Metropolitan Opera radio broadcasts in May 2004. With the 2004–2005 broadcast season, Juntwait took to the air on her own, introducing a performance of Verdi's I Vespri Sicilani. She became only the third regular announcer for the broadcasts, following Milton Cross and Allen.

On September 20, 2006, the Met announced that Juntwait would become a full-time Met employee, having been appointed as announcer of all programs on Sirius Satellite Radio's new Metropolitan Opera Radio channel. On Sirius, Juntwait hosted three or four live broadcasts a week during the opera season, and recorded introductions for hundreds of archive performances aired on the channel.

Juntwait also performed in radio theater plays produced by NPR veteran Joe Bevilacqua, including The Whithering of Willoughby and the Professor. In episode 16, Juntwait essays three roles in a parody of the British show The Prisoner from the 1960s. In episode 17, Juntwait portrays Willoughby's mother, a mermaid and god. The plays aired on "The Comedy-O-Rama Hour", heard on XM Satellite Radio's Sonic Theater Channel.

Juntwait died of ovarian cancer at a hospice facility in Saddle River, New Jersey on June 3, 2015, aged 58. According to a memorial published on the Metropolitan Opera website, Juntwait had been diagnosed with cancer over ten years prior to her death, but continued working with the Metropolitan Opera, missing only one Saturday matinee broadcast before January 2015. Her final live broadcast was on SiriusXM Radio on December 31, 2014. She recorded material for future broadcasts just a few weeks before she died.
