= Metropolitan Opera Radio (SiriusXM) =

- Broadcast area: United States Canada
- Frequency: Sirius XM Radio 75 DISH Network 6075

Programming
- Format: Opera

Ownership
- Owner: Sirius XM Radio

History
- First air date: September 25, 2006
- Former frequencies: Sirius XM 74 (2011-2017)

Technical information
- Class: Satellite Radio Station

Links
- Website: Met Opera Radio

Metropolitan Opera Radio is an all-opera radio station on Sirius Satellite Radio channel 75 (previously 78) and XM Satellite Radio channel 75 (previously 79). Originally on channel 85, Met Opera Radio was shifted to channel 78 on June 24, 2008. In December 2020 it was moved again — this time to channel 355. It is also on Dish Network channel 6078. It carries live broadcasts from the Metropolitan Opera two to three times each week during the opera season. In addition, throughout the day performances are presented from among the 1,500 recorded broadcasts in the Metropolitan Opera radio broadcast archives. The channel's host and announcer for the live broadcasts is Mary Jo Heath. The producers are Ellen Keel, John Bischoff, Matthew Principe, with William Berger as writer and commentator. Jay David Saks is the audio producer.

== History and description ==
The channel was launched at 6:30 PM, September 25, 2006 the opening night of the Met season. The first broadcast was a live performance of Puccini’s Madama Butterfly, conducted by James Levine, the Met's Music Director at the time, and directed by Anthony Minghella. It starred Chilean soprano Cristina Gallardo-Domâs as Cio-Cio-San, tenor Marcello Giordani as Pinkerton, and baritone Dwayne Croft as Sharpless.

Metropolitan Opera Radio replaced the existing "Classical Voices" channel in the Sirius channel lineup. While opera-oriented, the "Classical Voices" channel also offered some choral music and art songs programming (such as German lieder and French Chansons). The new channel was launched as part of new Met general manager Peter Gelb's initiative to utilize technology to make the Met's performances more accessible to a wide audience. The channel was added to the XM lineup (replacing the existing "Vox" channel) on November 12, 2008, as part of the merger between Sirius and XM.

Two to three live broadcasts of operas from the Met are presented each week of the Met's performing season. The performances are hosted by Mary Jo Heath with commentator William Berger. During intermissions live interviews with performers and other opera professionals and experts are interspersed with background information and informal chat by the co-hosts.

During the rest of the broadcast week, many of the Met's historic archived broadcast tapes are presented. These have been collected and re-mastered by the Met's sound archive department. When presented on Sirius, the original commentaries are replaced by introductions, which include short stories on principal performers and synopsis of each act, recorded by Margaret Juntwait. Of the Met's approximately 1500 archived broadcasts, Sirius's Met Opera Radio presented over 570 in its first three years.

Each day up to seven full length archived broadcasts are presented, starting at 6:00 AM. The channel's weekly schedule includes approximately 12 or 13 different archive recordings which are broadcast in rotation at different starting times. These broadcasts are then repeated with time-span ranging from few months to well over a year. In between the complete operas, shorter pieces of studio-recorded vocal music are presented. None of these is ever interrupted except to accommodate the start of a live broadcast.

Sirius also provides the sound transmission for the Metropolitan Opera's live high-definition video opera presentations in movie theaters world wide. The traditional Metropolitan Opera Radio Network Saturday broadcasts are also presented on Sirius's Met Opera channel.

== See also ==
- Metropolitan Opera radio broadcasts
- Metropolitan Opera
- List of Sirius Satellite Radio stations

== Sources ==
Adam Wasserman, "Sirius Business", Opera News, December 2006
