= William Berger (author) =

American writer

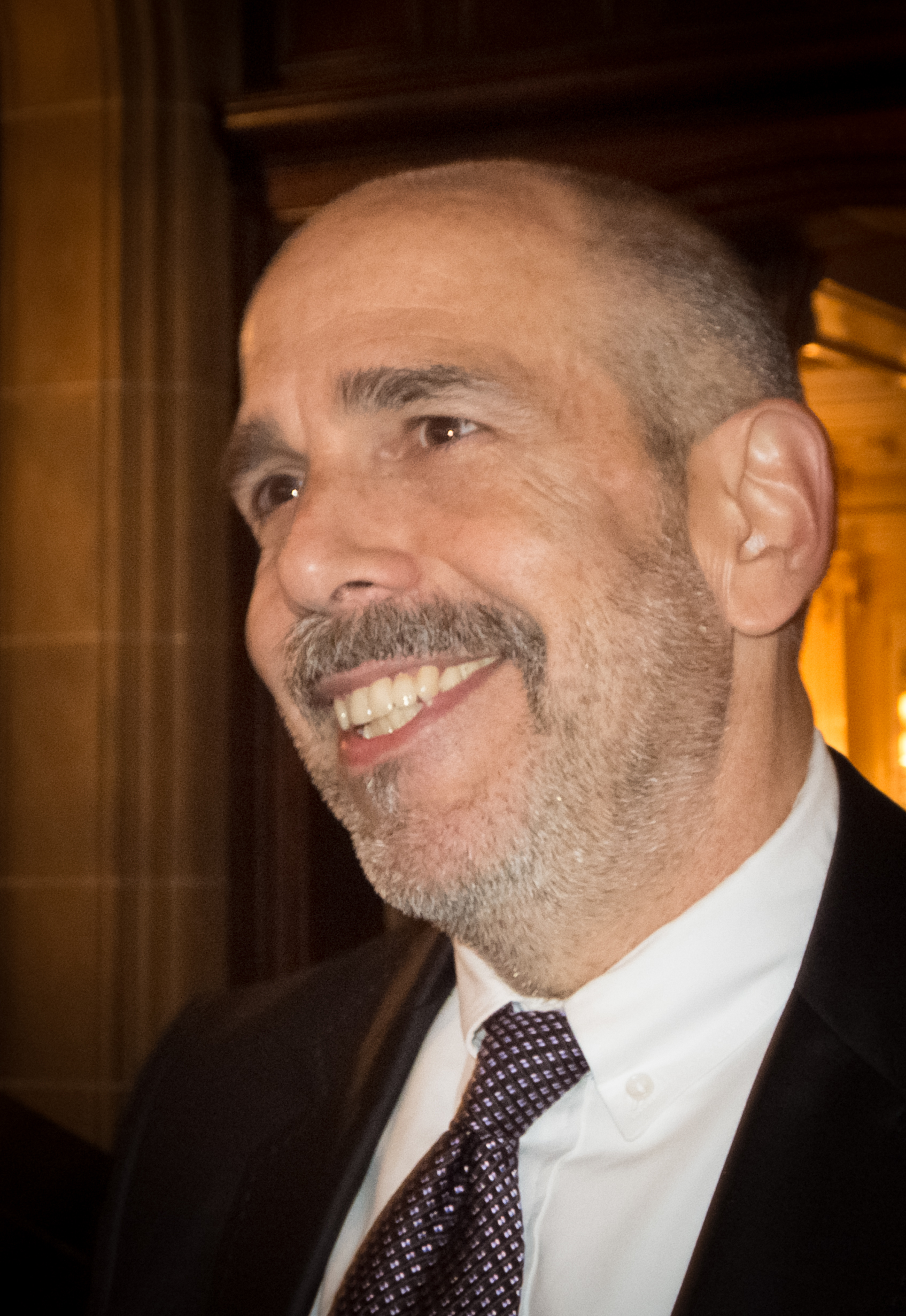
Image of William Berger

William Berger (or Will Berger) is an American author, radio music host and commentator.

Born in California on January 25, 1961, he studied Romance languages and musicology at the University of California, Santa Cruz. He was editor in chief for the Stanford Daily, the newspaper of Stanford University in Palo Alto, California from 1979 to 1980. For five years he worked in the San Francisco Opera, being responsible for acquiring company's records collection. As author, he wrote such books on music and operatic composers as: Wagner Without Fear (1998), Verdi With a Vengeance (2000), Puccini Without Excuses (2005), all published by Random House. He has also written opera libretti and articles on religion and architecture.

He frequently gives lectures on operatic music and composers, and is also a radio commentator and has recently been a regular host for New York Public Radio's Overnight Music and WNYC radio. Since creation of the Metropolitan Opera Radio on Sirius in the Fall of 2006, he writes all the commentaries heard during entractes of historical broadcasts. Berger is currently often a co-host during live Metropolitan Opera radio broadcasts, and is often the moderator of those broadcasts' Met Opera Quiz.

== Links ==
- Random House on William Berger
- The NPR Curious Listener's Guide to Opera by W. Berger, from eBookMall
