= Michael Manuel =

English opera director, set designer, stage manager, and screenwriter (1928–1999)

Michael Manuel (9 September 1928 – 5 April 1999) was an English opera director, set designer, stage manager, and screenwriter who was associated with the Metropolitan Opera. He is chiefly remembered for his work as director of the Metropolitan Opera National Company in the mid 1960s. He later worked as researcher and script writer for John Heyman's film series "The New Media Bible", including the 1979 film Jesus which has been translated into more languages than any other film.

== Life and career ==
Born in London, Manuel studied at the Royal Academy of Music in 1944–1945. He left school to join the Royal Army Service Corps. In 1948 he joined the staff at The Royal Opera, Covent Garden,, as an assistant stage manager. In 1950 he became a stage manager with The Royal Ballet (then called Saddler Wells Ballet), with whom he remained until 1957 when he was recruited by Rudolf Bing to join the staff of the Metropolitan Opera during the Royal Ballet's tour to the United States. Manuel served as the Met's executive stage manager from 1957 to 1964. Operas he stage-directed at the Met included Verdi's Simon Boccanegra (1961), Alban Berg's Wozzeck (1961), Verdi's La traviata (1961), Puccini's La fanciulla del West (1961), Verdi's La forza del destino (1961), Verdi's Un ballo in maschera (1962), Johann Strauss II's Die Fledermaus (1963), and Strauss's Ariadne auf Naxos (1963) among others.

Manuel also periodically directed and set-designed for the Met. In December 1960 he both directed and designed a new production of Christoph Willibald Gluck's Alceste for the Met debut of soprano Eileen Farrell. Other operas he directed at the Met included Gluck's Orfeo ed Euridice (1962, with Kerstin Meyer and Lucine Amara in the title roles); and Richard Strauss's Elektra (1962, with Elektra with Gerda Lammers as the title heroine). In the summer of 1962 he directed productions of Puccini's Madama Butterfly, Strauss's Salome, Puccini's La bohème, and Puccini's Tosca for the Cincinnati Opera's summer season at the Cincinnati Zoo and Botanical Garden.

In 1963 Rudolf Bing appointed Manuel and mezzo Risë Stevens as co-directors of the newly created Metropolitan Opera National Company (MONC); a project which was announced to the public that year by President John F. Kennedy. Manuel served as the company's business manager, stage director, and occasional director and designer; while Stevens was in charge of artistic decisions, music direction, and mentoring the young operatic talent that included several prominent singers in the early parts of their careers. Thee artists included sopranos Clarice Carson, Maralin Niska, Mary Beth Peil, Francesca Roberto, and Marilyn Zschau; mezzo-sopranos Joy Davidson, Sylvia Friederich, Dorothy Krebill, and Huguette Tourangeau; tenors Enrico Di Giuseppe, Chris Lachona, Nicholas di Virgilio, and Harry Theyard; baritones Ron Bottcher, John Fiorito, Thomas Jamerson, Julian Patrick, and Vern Shinall; bass-baritones Andrij Dobriansky, Ronald Hedlund, and Arnold Voketaitis; and bass Paul Plishka.

The MONC presented only two seasons of operas, as Rudolph Bing, while publicly supportive, had opposed the organizations creation by the Met's board. The MONC's first season included 260 performances in 72 cities over a nine-month period from September 1965 through May 1966. Works presented that season included Carlisle Floyd's Susannah, Rossini's La Cenerentola, Giacomo Puccini's Madama Butterfly, and Georges Bizet's Carmen. The company made its debut on 29 September 1965 at the Clowes Memorial Hall at Butler University in Indianapolis with Maralin Niska as Floyd's Susannah. The second season of the MONC ran from September 1966 through May 1967 with performances of Giuseppe Verdi's La traviata, Puccini's La bohème, Mozart's The Marriage of Figaro and Benjamin Britten's The Rape of Lucretia. A planned third season was cancelled after the company dissolved following the conclusion of the second season.

Manuel left the staff of the Metropolitan Opera after the touring company was folded. He transitioned careers into educational and Christian television and film, notably working as a researcher and scriptwriter for the “New Media Bible” among other organizations. Among his projects for the New Media Bible were the films Genesis and Gospel of Luke.

Manuel lived in New Hope, Pennsylvania, and died of lung cancer at Hunterdon Medical Center in Flemington, New Jersey, in 1999.
