= Risë Stevens =

American operatic mezzo-soprano (1913–2013)

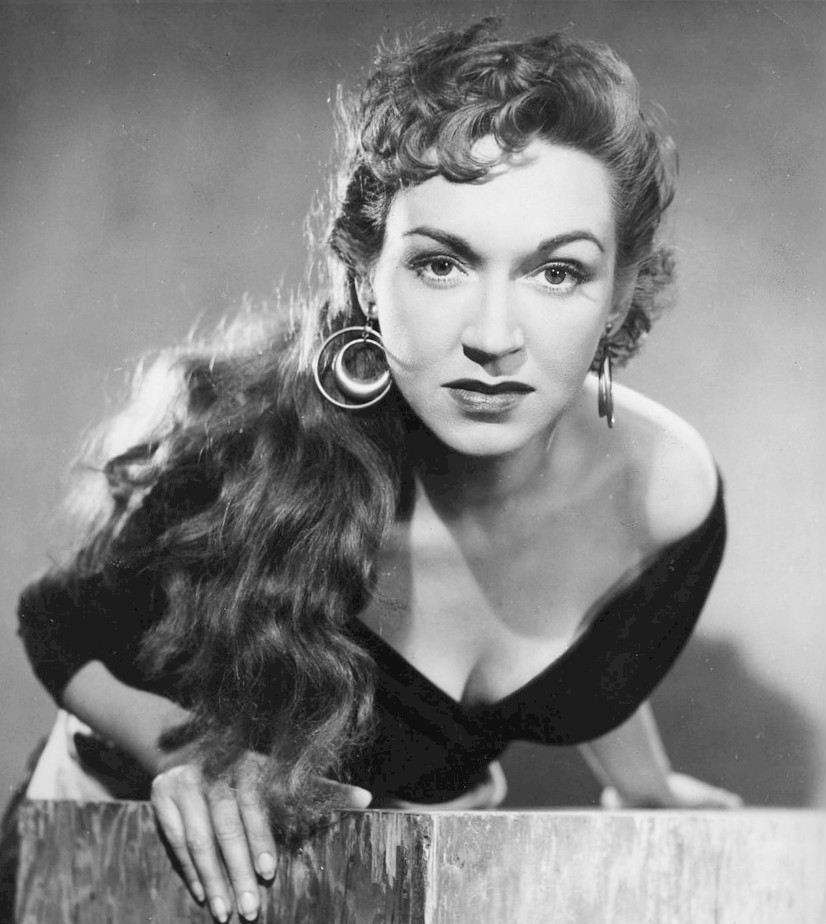
- Stevens as Carmen in 1959
- Born: Risë Gus Steenberg; June 11, 1913; New York City, U.S.
- Died: March 20, 2013 (aged 99); New York City, U.S.
- Years active: 1936–1974
- Spouse: Walter Surovy (m. 1939; died 2001)
- Children: 1

Risë Stevens (/ˈriːsə/; June 11, 1913 – March 20, 2013) was an American operatic mezzo-soprano and actress. Beginning in 1938, she sang for the Metropolitan Opera in New York City for more than two decades during the 1940s and 1950s. She was most noted for her portrayals of the central character in Carmen by Georges Bizet. From 1963 to 1968 she was director of the Metropolitan Opera National Company.

== Early life and education ==
Stevens was born Risë Gus Steenberg in New York City, the daughter of Sarah "Sadie" (née Mechanic) and Christian Carl Steenberg, an advertising salesman. Her father was of Norwegian descent and her mother was Jewish (of Polish and Russian descent). She had a younger brother, Lewis "Bud" Steenberg, a Private First Class, who was killed in action in World War II as an Engineer in the 297th Engineer Combat Battalion in Normandy on June 9, 1944; he was among those elements of the battalion that were attached to either the Omaha or Utah Beach assaults on D-Day. She studied at New York's Juilliard School for three years, and with Anna Eugénie Schoen-René (1864–1942). She went to Vienna, where she was trained by Marie Gutheil-Schoder and Herbert Graf. She made her début as Mignon in Prague in 1936 and stayed there until 1938, also singing in guest appearances at the Vienna State Opera.

== Career ==
Stevens was engaged as a member of the Vienna State Opera ensemble at the Teatro Colón in 1938 (as Octavian in Der Rosenkavalier) and was invited to the Glyndebourne Festival in 1939 where she was heard as Dorabella and Cherubino. In 1938 she made her début with the Metropolitan Opera on tour in Philadelphia as Octavian opposite Lotte Lehmann as the Marschallin. Three weeks later at the Metropolitan Opera in New York City, she sang Mignon in a Saturday matinee broadcast in a cast that included Richard Crooks as Wilhelm Meister and Ezio Pinza as Lothario. During the 1940s, Stevens appeared in a few Hollywood films, including The Chocolate Soldier (1941) with Nelson Eddy. She played an opera singer in Going My Way (1944) with Bing Crosby, wherein she is credited as a contralto; she is featured performing the "Habanera " from Bizet's opera Carmen, "Going My Way" with the Robert Mitchell Boys Choir, and the Schubert "Ave Maria" with Bing Crosby and the choir. Stevens disliked the process of making films and found the Hollywood scene in general even more disagreeable. She returned exclusively to opera.

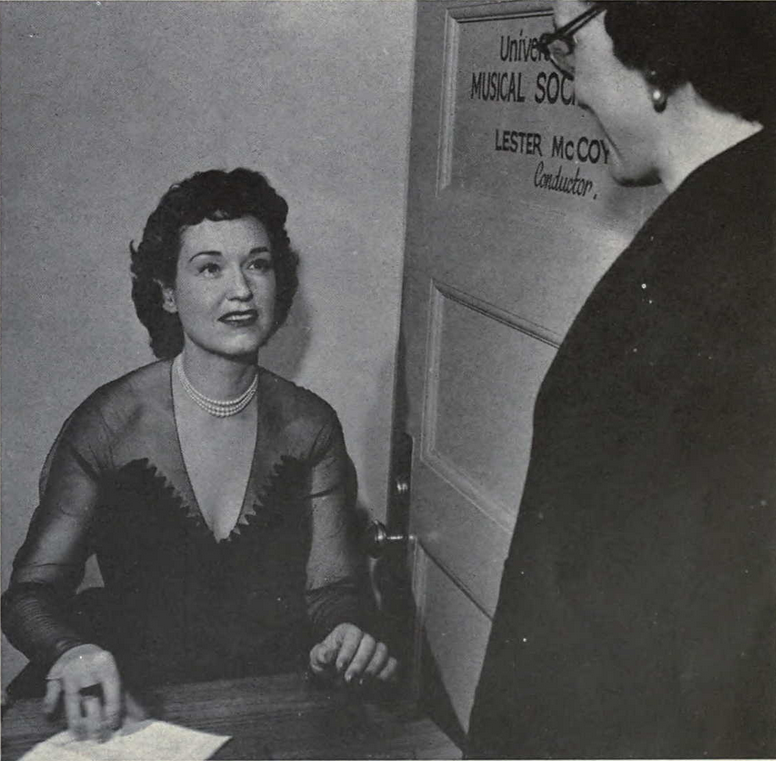
Stevens visiting the University of Michigan, 1952–1953

Stevens' other operatic roles included Fricka in Wagner's The Ring of the Nibelung, Marfa in Mussorgsky's Khovanshchina, Giulietta in The Tales of Hoffmann, and Prince Orlovsky in Die Fledermaus.

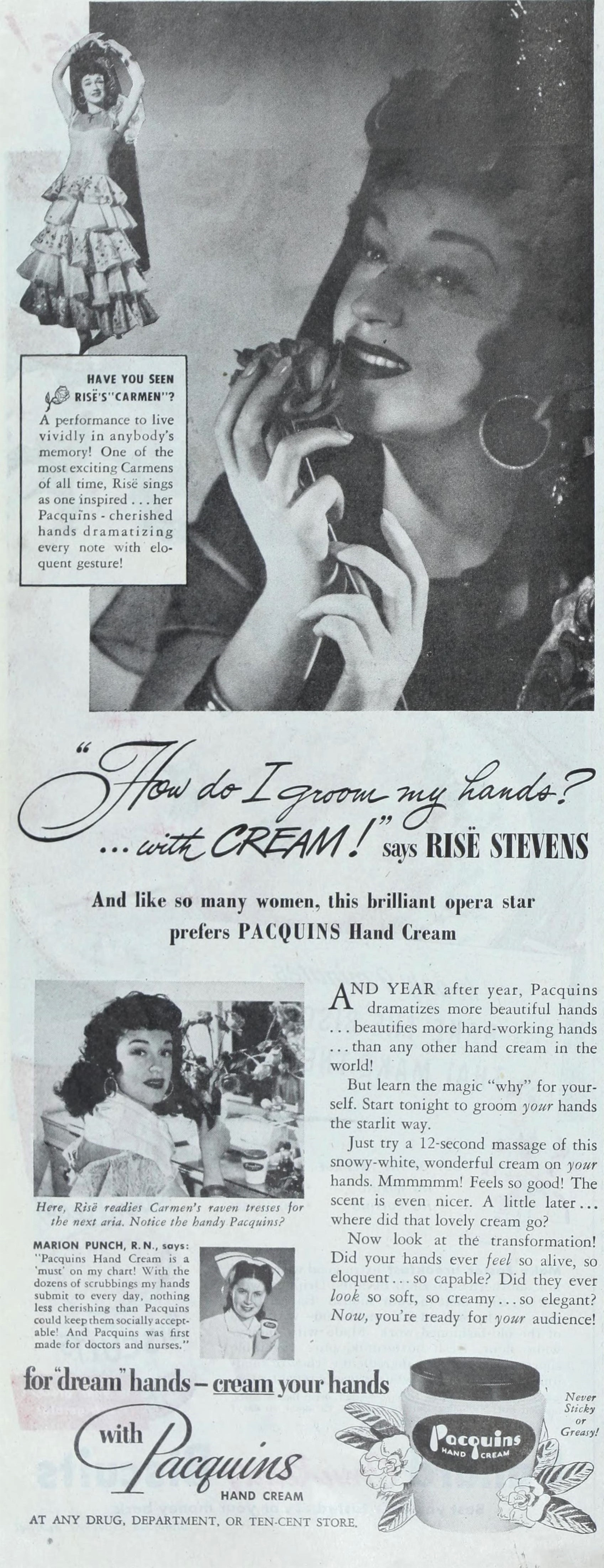
Stevens as Carmen in an advertisement for Pacquins Hand Cream, Ladies' Home Journal, March 1948

Stevens' acclaimed RCA Victor recording of the complete opera Carmen, conducted by Fritz Reiner and co-starring Jan Peerce, Robert Merrill and Licia Albanese remains a best-seller and has been continuously available since its original 1951 release. She also appeared in Paris, London, and the London Palladium. Stevens' farewell performance at the Metropolitan Opera was as Carmen in 1961.

Stevens toured the U.S. annually for several decades singing recitals. In 1962, she recorded the voice of Glinda for Journey Back to Oz, but the production ran out of money and was halted for more than four years. It was only after the Filmation studio had made profits on their numerous television series that the project was completed (which was copyrighted 1971, released in 1972 in the United Kingdom and in 1974 in the United States). After her retirement from the operatic stage, Stevens served as General Manager of the Metropolitan Opera National Company until 1966 and later coached new singers at the Met. Stevens made occasional television appearances, including a guest-starring role on NBC's The Martha Raye Show.

Stevens sang the starring role of Liza Elliott on the original 1963 studio cast recording of Lady in the Dark (Columbia OL-5990/OS-2390),. That album was digitally remastered for CD in 1997, as part of the Masterworks Heritage Vocal Series (Sony MHK 62869).

In 1963, Stevens and Michael Manuel were appointed co-directors of the Metropolitan Opera National Company (MONC), a second touring company of the Metropolitan Opera that featured American and Canadian artists in their early stages of career development, by Sir Rudolf Bing. She remained director until the company dissolved in 1968, during which time she mentored several prominent singers with the MONC, including sopranos Clarice Carson, Maralin Niska, Mary Beth Peil, Francesca Roberto, and Marilyn Zschau; mezzo-sopranos Joy Davidson, Sylvia Friederich, Dorothy Krebill, and Huguette Tourangeau; tenors Enrico Di Giuseppe, Chris Lachona, Nicholas di Virgilio, and Harry Theyard; baritones Ron Bottcher, John Fiorito, Thomas Jamerson, Julian Patrick, and Vern Shinall; bass-baritones Andrij Dobriansky, Ronald Hedlund, and Arnold Voketaitis; and bass Paul Plishka.

During 1975 to 1978 Stevens was president of the Mannes College of Music in New York City.

On October 22, 1977, Stevens was awarded the University of Pennsylvania Glee Club Award of Merit. Established in 1964, this award sought "to bring a declaration of appreciation to an individual each year that has made a significant contribution to the world of music and helped to create a climate in which our talents may find valid expression". She was a Kennedy Center Honoree in 1990. Stevens has been the subject of two biographies, Kyle Crichton's Subway to the Met (1959) and John Pennino's Risë Stevens: A Life in Music (1999).

== Personal life ==
In 1939, Stevens married Walter Surovy, an Austrian stage and screen actor she met during her European years, after he fled the Nazis to New York. One likely display of Surovy's finesse with publicity was that Stevens' voice was insured by Lloyd's of London in 1945 for $1 million. The marriage lasted for over 61 years, until Walter's death in 2001. They had one child.

== Death ==
Stevens died in her Manhattan home on March 20, 2013, at the age of 99, three months short of her 100th birthday. Her body was cremated.

== Awards ==
Stevens was honored many times over her long career including honorary degrees from Russell Sage (H.H. D.), Hobart, and Smith Colleges (Mus. D.).

== Legacy ==
She established the Risë Stevens scholarship at Adelphi College.

== Work ==
=== Film ===
Stevens was a part of a number of Hollywood productions, her most memorable being in the Oscar-winning film Going My Way alongside costars Bing Crosby and Barry Fitzgerald.

- 1974 – Journey Back to Oz as Glinda the Good Witch, (voice)
- 1958 – Little Women (TV movie) as Margaret March
- 1958 – Hansel and Gretel (TV movie) as Mother
- 1956 – Producers' Showcase (TV series) as Carmen in Carmen excerpt
- 1955 – The Chocolate Soldier (TV movie) as Nadina
- 1952 – Carmen (TV movie) as Carmen
- 1949 – Der Rosenkavalier (TV movie) as Octavian
- 1944 – Going My Way as Genevieve Linden
- 1941 – The Chocolate Soldier as Maria Lanyi, Karl's Wife

=== Selected discography ===
External audio
- You may hear Rise Stevens performing Georges Bizet's opera Carmen with Fritz Reiner conducting the RCA Victor Orchestra and Jan Peerce, Robert Merrill and Licia Albanese in 1951 Here on archive.org
- Rise Stevens performing Saint-Saens opera Samson and Delilah with Mario Del Monaco, Ezio Flagelo and Fausto Cleve conducting the Metropolitan Opera Orchestra in 1959 Here on archive.org

- The King and I (Lincoln Center cast album), with Darren McGavin as The King, 1965
- Gluck: Orfeo and Euridice (highlights); with Lisa Della Casa and Roberta Peters, Rome Opera House Orchestra and Chorus, Pierre Monteux, conductor. RCA Victor (1957)
- Saint-Saens: Samson and Delilah (highlights); with Mario Del Monaco and Ezio Flagello, Metropolitan Opera Orchestra, Fausto Cleva, conductor. RCA Victor (1959)
