= Phyllis Curtin =

American operatic soprano

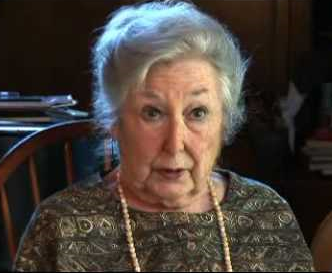
- Phyllis Curtin in 2010
- Born: Phyllis Smith; December 3, 1921; Clarksburg, West Virginia, U.S.
- Died: June 5, 2016 (aged 94); Great Barrington, Massachusetts, U.S.
- Education: Wellesley College; New England Conservatory
- Occupations: Operatic soprano; Academic teacher
- Organizations: New York City Opera; Yale University; Boston University College of Fine Arts; Tanglewood Music Center
- Spouse: Philip Curtin Gene Cook
- Children: Claudia d’Alessandro

Phyllis Curtin (née Smith; December 3, 1921 – June 5, 2016) was an American soprano and academic teacher who had an active career in operas and concerts from the early 1950s through the 1980s. She is known for her creation of roles in operas by Carlisle Floyd, such as the title role in Susannah and Catherine Earnshaw in Wuthering Heights. She was a dedicated song recitalist, who retired from singing in 1984. She was named Boston University's Dean Emerita, College of Fine Arts in 1991.

== Education and early career ==
Phyllis Smith was born in Clarksburg, West Virginia, and studied singing with Olga Averino at Wellesley College where she earned a bachelor's degree in Political Science. She pursued graduate studies in vocal performance under Boris Goldovsky at the New England Conservatory. In 1946 she made her professional opera debut with Goldovsky's opera company, the New England Opera Theater, as Tatyana in Tchaikovsky's Eugene Onegin. She took the surname Curtin from her first husband, whom she divorced after nine years.

She performed several other roles with the company over the next seven years, including Countess Almaviva in Mozart's The Marriage of Figaro (1947). In 1950, Curtin performed in the inaugural year of the Peabody Mason Concerts in Boston. In 1953 she joined the roster of principal sopranos at the New York City Opera (NYCO) at the invitation of Joseph Rosenstock. She made her debut with the company on October 22, 1953, portraying three roles (Fräulein Bürstner, Frau Grubach, and Leni) in the U.S. premiere of Einem's The Trial.

She remained committed to the NYCO through 1960, where her roles included Alice Ford in Verdi's Falstaff, Antonia in Offenbach's The Tales of Hoffmann, Countess Almaviva, Cressida in Troilus and Cressida, Fiordiligi in Mozart's Così fan tutte, Frau Fluth in Nicolai's The Merry Wives of Windsor, Katharina in Vittorio Giannini's The Taming of the Shrew, Konstanze in Mozart's Die Entführung aus dem Serail, Mélisande in Debussy's Pelléas et Mélisande, Norina in Donizetti's Don Pasquale, Rosalinde in Die Fledermaus by Johann Strauss, and the title roles in Verdi's La traviata and in Salome by Richard Strauss. She sang two roles in operas by Carlisle Floyd with the NYCO that she had previously created in their world premieres: the title role in Susannah (which she sang at Florida State University for its 1955 world premiere) and Catherine Earnshaw in Wuthering Heights (which she sang at the Santa Fe Opera for its 1958 premiere).

She appeared as Thérèse in the American premiere of Poulenc's Les mamelles de Tirésias at Brandeis University in 1953. She returned to Brandeis two years later to portray the title role in Milhaud's Médée.

In 1956 she toured the U.S. with the NBC Opera Company as Countess Almaviva with Walter Cassel as the Count, Adelaide Bishop as Susana, and Frances Bible as Cherubino. In 1957 she appeared as Elena in Gluck's Paride ed Elena with the American Opera Society. In 1958 she portrayed Floyd's Susannah at the Brussels World's Fair. In the 1959–1960 season she sang two roles with the Philadelphia Lyric Opera Company: Rosalinde and Susannah. In 1959 she made her debut at the Teatro Colón in Buenos Aires. She also made appearances at the Aspen Music Festival, the Cincinnati Opera, the Tanglewood Music Festival, and appeared in concerts with the Boston Symphony Orchestra, the New York Philharmonic, the Philadelphia Orchestra, and The Little Orchestra Society during the 1950s.

== Later career ==
After the close of the 1959–60 season, Curtin left the employ of the NYCO, although she would continue to perform as a guest artist with the company up through 1964; she returned for performances in 1975 and 1976. She sang Fiordiligi for the NBC Television Opera Theatre in 1960. She sang several roles at the Vienna State Opera from 1960–61, including the title role of Puccini's Madama Butterfly, Fiordiligi, Salome, and Traviata. In 1961 she made her debuts at the Oper Frankfurt, the Staatsoper Stuttgart, and the Teatro Lirico Giuseppe Verdi. She made her first appearance at the Lyric Opera of Chicago in 1965 and her debut at the Seattle Opera in 1969. In the same year she appeared as Donna Anna in Mozart's Don Giovanni at the Glyndebourne Festival.

Curtin appeared at the La Scala in Milan in 1962, in Cosí fan tutte opposite Teresa Berganza. In 1966 she appeared in the world premiere of Milhaud's La mère coupable at the Grand Théâtre de Genève. In 1968 she appeared as Mimì in Puccini's La Bohème at the Philadelphia Grand Opera Company with Richard Tucker as Rodolfo and Ron Bottcher as Marcello. Other guest appearances included performances at the Scottish Opera (as Marguerite in Gounod's Faust and Ellen Orford in Britten's Peter Grimes) at La Scala.

Curtin made her Metropolitan Opera (Met) debut on November 4, 1961, as Fiordiligi to the Ferrando of George Shirley, Dorabella of Rosalind Elias, Guglielmo of Theodor Uppman, Despina of Roberta Peters, and Don Alfonso of Frank Guarrera. She returned frequently as a guest artist at the Met, appearing in such roles as Alice Ford, Countess Almaviva, Donna Anna, Ellen Orford, Eva in Wagner's Die Meistersinger von Nürnberg, Rosalinde, Salome, and Violetta. Her last Met appearance was on July 6, 1973, in the title role of Puccini's Tosca with Enrico Di Giuseppe as Cavaradossi and Ignace Strasfogel conducting.

== Teaching ==
Curtin was a professor of voice at the School of Music at Yale University from 1974-1983. She was Artistic Advisor at the Opera Institute at the Boston University College of Fine Arts School of Music, where she held a Deanship of the Schools for the Arts, as well as Artist-in-Residence at the Tanglewood Music Center where she taught voice for more than fifty years.

From 1979–83 she was the master of Yale's Branford College, making her that college's first female master, despite Branford fellows asking Yale to choose a "real master" instead. Curtin was dean of Boston University’s College of Fine Arts from 1983 to 1991, and founded its Opera Institute in 1987. As professor Emerita at Boston University's Opera Institute, Curtin taught a series of masterclasses at the school each semester.

== Personal life ==
She married Philip Curtin, a history professor, in 1946. In April 1954 Life Magazine devoted three pages to pictures of her, describing her "long-limbed, lush-voiced and intense" account of the Dance of the Seven Veils in Strauss's Salome. Soon afterwards her marriage was dissolved. In 1956 she married Eugene Cook, a photographer with Life Magazine. He died in 1986. The couple had one child, Claudia Madeleine, born 1961.

Curtin died at her home in Great Barrington, Massachusetts, on June 5, 2016, aged 94, having suffered from rheumatoid arthritis and circulatory ailments.

== Video and audio recordings ==
In 1995, VAI released, on compact discs, the 1962 performance of Susannah, from New Orleans, which co-starred Norman Treigle and Richard Cassilly. VAI and other record companies have released other CDs featuring Curtin. In 1988, Kultur published a video cassette recording of the 1968 The Bell Telephone Hour program, "Opera: Two to Six".

She can be seen in staged excerpts from Faust and Die Meistersinger von Nürnberg. VAI later released several Bell Telephone Hour DVDs featuring Curtin. In 2007 VAI released a DVD featuring Curtin in the soprano role (i.e., the Latin text) in Britten's War Requiem. This 1963 performance by the Boston Symphony Orchestra conducted by Erich Leinsdorf at Tanglewood was the work's American premiere.

== Tributes ==
- In 1976, President Gerald Ford invited her to sing for a White House dinner honoring West German Chancellor Helmut Schmidt.
- Curtin served on the National Council for the Arts, and in 1994 was designated a U.S. Ambassador for the Arts, a new honor given former council members.
- She received Wellesley College's Alumnae Achievement Award and BU's College of Fine Arts Distinguished Faculty Award. She also held a number of honorary degrees in music and the humanities, including an honorary Doctor of Humane Letters from West Virginia Wesleyan College awarded in 1985.
- The Paley Center for Media in Manhattan showed the 1956 NBC-TV production of Così fan tutte on January 19, 2008, 50 years after its original 1958 airing. Curtin sang Fiordiligi in this production. The screening was followed by a conversation with the soprano and music critic Martin Bernheimer.
- In 2017, a portrait of her was unveiled at the dining hall in Branford College, which previously only had portraits of men.
