= Eugene Holmes =

American opera singer (1934–2007)

Eugene B. Holmes (March 7, 1934 – January 19, 2007) was an American operatic baritone who sang with the New York City Opera, the Metropolitan Opera National Company and the Deutsche Oper am Rhein.

== Early life and education ==
He was born March 7, 1934, in Brownsville, Tennessee, the eleventh of fourteen brothers and sisters. His father was a Baptist preacher and farmer/sharecropper. Eugene attended Cole elementary school and Washington Technical High school in St. Louis, and then Harris Stowe Teachers State College until his sophomore year, when he auditioned for the St. Louis Music Chore and won a full scholarship to University of Arkansas at Pine Bluff.

== Career ==
After graduating, he returned to St. Louis where he worked as a social worker in the Pruitt–Igoe projects. Later he was certified as a teacher and taught elementary school, then high school for several years. He served in the Navy from 1956 to 1959 aboard on the USS Conflict. During this time, he sang in the Navy Blue Jackets.

Holmes went with a friend to a rehearsal of the American opera The Crucible. There he met accompanist and director Dorothy Zeigler, who was also the first trombonist for the St. Louis Symphony Orchestra. Dorothy introduced Holmes to Boris Goldovsky, who ran the opera workshop in Wheeling, West Virginia. Godofsky offered Holmes a leading role in his yearly opera workshop for young musicians.

After the clinic, Holmes was offered a scholarship and attended University of Indiana in Bloomington. He began performing with the New York Metropolitan Opera National Touring Company soon after completing his graduate education.

Holmes was an artist-in-residence at Tougaloo College in Mississippi and the Music Faculty at University of Miami.

In 1970, Holmes performed with Plácido Domingo in Aida in the Vienna State Opera.

Holmes sang with the New York City Opera, and in 1971 he played the lead role of Ukamba written for him by Gian Carlo Menotti, in the world premier of The Most Important Man. His singing attracted acclaim from critics, including Alan Rush of New York magazine in 1971, and when he sang under permanent contract with the Deutsche Oper am Rhein, Düsseldorf, Time magazine reported his singing as "superb". Dieter Bross of Style Magazine, Germany, in 1981 declared him to be the best black baritone at that time.

Holmes was also in demand as a concert singer. In March 1990, Holmes was awarded the title Kammersänger at the Deutsche Oper am Rhein.
