= Zschau =

Zschau is a surname. Notable people with the surname include:

- Ed Zschau (born 1940), American educator and politician from California
- Katrin Zschau (born 1976), German politician
- Marilyn Zschau (born 1944), American operatic soprano
