= Ron Bottcher =

American opera singer (1940–1991)

Ron Bottcher (born John Ronald Bottcher, 11 May 1940 – 18 April 1991) was an American operatic baritone who was actively performing with both the New York City Opera (NYCO) and the Metropolitan Opera during the 1960s. A native of Sandpoint, Idaho, he was educated at Montana State University and the Curtis Institute of Music. He developed vocal problems which led to the cancelling of performances in 1969. He rarely performed after this.

== Early life and education ==
The son of John and Lucille Bottcher, John Ronald Bottcher was born on 11 May 1940 in Sandpoint, Idaho. After graduating from Sandpoint Senior High School in 1958, he studied music at Montana State University (MSU) where he portrayed Count Almaviva in MSU's 1958 production of The Marriage of Figaro. He studied voice at MSU with John Lester. In his sophomore year at MSU, at just 19 years old, he won first place in the regional division of the Metropolitan Opera National Council Auditions held in Seattle.

After completing his second year at MSU in the Spring of 1960, Bottcher transferred to the Curtis Institute of Music in Philadelphia. There he studied singing with Euphemia Gregory (sister of composer Vittorio Giannini). He never graduated from either MSU or Curtis; dropping out from the latter school after a year of study to join the Santa Fe Opera (SFO). In 1962 he married Priscilla Lester, the daughter of his voice teacher at MSU.

== Career ==
Bottcher made his professional opera debut in the summer of 1961 at the SFO; as Schaunard in Giacomo Puccini's La bohème. He was also heard at the SFO that season as Leopold in Richard Strauss' Der Rosenkavalier and the Head waiter in Paul Hindemith's Neues vom Tage. In 1962 he portrayed Ford in The Merry Wives of Windsor with the Fine Arts Opera Company at Notre Dame College on Staten Island. He returned to SFO in the summer of 1962 as Giorgio Germont in Giuseppe Verdi's La traviata, and the Second Japanese Envoy in The Nightingale. In October 1963 he performed for President John F. Kennedy, First Lady Jacqueline Kennedy, and their guests at a state dinner given in honor of Emperor Haile Selassie at the White House.

In 1962 Bottcher joined the New York City Opera (NYCO) with whom he toured that year as Count Monterone in Verdi's Rigoletto with Chester Ludgin in the title role. He subsequently performed with NYCO in Oedipus rex (1963), Sharpless in Puccini's Madama Butterfly (1963 1964), Marcello in Giacomo Puccini's La bohème (1963), and Escamillo in Georges Bizet's Carmen (1965). In the summer of 1963 he performed the role of Count Almaviva in The Marriage of Figaro with the Chautauqua Opera. In 1964 he performed the role of Lorenzo in Vincenzo Bellini's I Capuleti e i Montecchi with the American Opera Society at Carnegie Hall with Mary Costa as Giulietta. He sang Sharpless for his debut with the San Francisco Opera in 1965.

For the 1965-1966 season Bottcher toured the United States and Canada in performances with the Metropolitan Opera National Company (MONC); the young artist touring arm of the Metropolitan Opera (the "Met"). With the MONC he appeared as Sharpless with Francesca Roberto as Butterfly, Marilyn Zschau as Suzuki, and Enrico Di Giuseppe as Pinkerton. From the MONC he graduated to the Met, making his debut with the Metropolitan Opera in a Lewisohn Stadium concert on July 29, 1966 as Amonasro in Aida with Lucine Amara in the title role.

Bottcher sang at the Met for two years; performing the roles of Silvio in Pagliacci (1966, with Plácido Domingo as Canio), Baron Douphol in La traviata (1966-1967, with Anna Moffo as Violetta), Melot in Tristan und Isolde (1966-1967, with Ticho Parly as Tristan and Birgit Nilsson as Isolde), a nobleman and the King's Herald in Lohengrin (1966-1968, with Sándor Kónya in the title role), Frank in Die Fledermaus (1966-1967, with Kitty Carlisle as Prince Orlofsky), Sharpless in Madama Butterfly (1967-1968), Peter in Hansel and Gretel (1967), Moralès in Carmen (1967-1968, with Grace Bumbry in the title role), and Valentin in Faust (1968, with Jan Peerce in the title role). He also created roles in the world premieres of two operas at the Met: portraying Scarus in Samuel Barber's Antony and Cleopatra (1966) with Leontyne Price, and Captain Peter Niles in Marvin David Levy's Mourning Becomes Electra (1967).

In 1968 Bottcher performed Marcello to Joan Sena's Musetta in the Philadelphia Grand Opera Company's production of La bohème at the Academy of Music, and portrayed Escamillo in Carmen with the New Orleans Opera. In 1969 he sang Marcello at the Pittsburgh Opera. Later that year he developed vocal problems which led to a canceling of performance engagements. His performances were rare after this. In 1978 he performed the role of Escamillo with the Charleston Opera Company.

Bottcher died on 18 April 1991 at the age of 50 at Lenox Hill Hospital in Manhattan of AIDS related illness.
