= Harry Theyard =

American operatic tenor (born 1929)

Harry Theyard (né Harry L. Theard, Jr, on 28 September 1929, in New Orleans) is an American operatic tenor.

Theyard is a 1957 graduate of Loyola University of the South, where he studied under Dorothy Hulse, who was also the teacher of Audrey Schuh and Charles Anthony. He began his career with the New Orleans Opera Association in secondary parts, including appearances in Salome (1949), Le nozze di Figaro (1956), Il trovatore (opposite Herva Nelli, 1958) and The Beggar's Opera (directed by Lillian Gish, 1958). Later, in New York, he studied under Armen Boyajian, also the pedagogue of Marisa Galvany, Paul Plishka, and Samuel Ramey.

== New York City Opera ==
The spinto tenor debuted with the New York City Opera in 1959, in The Devil and Daniel Webster, directed by John Houseman. He went on to sing in the world premieres of Ward's The Crucible (starring Chester Ludgin), Floyd's The Passion of Jonathan Wade (with Phyllis Curtin), and Menotti's The Most Important Man (conducted by Christopher Keene). By 1970, Theyard was one of the City Opera's leading tenors, appearing in Madama Butterfly, Mefistofele (opposite Norman Treigle), Louise, The Makropoulos Case, Carmen, Susannah, Tosca (with Galvany), Cavalleria rusticana, Les contes d'Hoffmann, Turandot and La fanciulla del West.

== Metropolitan Opera ==
In 1966, he first appeared with the Metropolitan Opera National Company, in La traviata and La bohème. In 1970 he portrayed Curly in the world premiere of Carlisle Floyd's Of Mice and Men at the Seattle Opera. In 1973, Theyard sang in Manon Lescaut at the Spoleto Festival, with Nancy Shade directed by Luchino Visconti and conducted by Thomas Schippers. In 1974, he debuted with the Metropolitan Opera for an impressive string of operas: Les contes d'Hoffmann (with Dame Joan Sutherland), Manon Lescaut, Madama Butterfly, Cavalleria rusticana, Grigori in Boris Godunov, La forza del destino (directed by John Dexter), L'assedio di Corinto (Beverly Sills's house debut) and Il tabarro (with Renata Scotto). From 1976, he returned to his native city for starring roles in Manon Lescaut, Lucia di Lammermoor, Andrea Chénier, La bohème and Carmen (opposite Shirley Verrett).

== Broadway ==
Mr Theyard also appeared on Broadway, in the original productions of Man of La Mancha (as Anselmo the muleteer, 1965) and A Time for Singing (as Owen Morgan, 1966). The latter was a musical version of How Green Was My Valley, and was not a success; Man of La Mancha, on the other hand, was an enormous hit and has become a musical-comedy classic. In it, Mr Theyard introduced the song "Little Bird, Little Bird."

In 1975, he appeared on television in the CBS Christmas special, "A Handful of Souls."

== Operatic discography ==
- Rossini: L'assedio di Corinto (Sills, Verrett, Díaz; Schippers, 1974) EMI
- Refice: Cecilia: abridged (Scotto; Campori, 1976) [live] VAI

== Musical-theatre discography ==
- Leigh, Darion: Man of La Mancha (Kiley, Diener, original cast, 1966) MCA
