= Video Artists International =

American classical music label

- Founded: 1983
- Genre: Classical music
- Country of origin: United States
- Location: Pleasantville, New York
- Official website: www.vaimusic.com

Video Artists International (VAI), is an independent American CD and DVD-label specializing in classical music performances founded in 1983, and based in Pleasantville, NY. The company started as one of the first labels to release complete operas and ballets on home video, originally in VHS videocassette format. In the early 1990s the label added historical CDs (using the name Video Artists International Audio or VAIA) to its video catalogue. VAI's video catalog includes an extensive series of performances from The Bell Telephone Hour. Among the first CDs were performances of arias by Phyllis Curtin, and the 1962 recording of the New Orleans Opera's production of Carlisle Floyd's Susannah (with Curtin and Norman Treigle).
