= Walter Surovy =

Austrian actor (1910–2001)

Walter Surovy (sometimes spelled Szurovy; 28 May 1910 in Vienna – 4 November 2001 in Manhattan, New York City) was an Austrian stage and film actor.

He appeared in leading roles at the Theater in der Josefstadt, the Salzburg Festival, and the Neues Deutsches Theater. He starred in several European films before moving to Hollywood, where a brief acting career led to a role in Howard Hawks' To Have and Have Not (under the name Walter Molnar).

He was the manager and husband of mezzo-soprano singer Risë Stevens. The couple wed in 1939 and remained together until Surovy's death in 2001. They had one child, a son, actor Nicolas Surovy. In 1941, he founded the Polk-Szurovy Agency. After his wife retired, he managed the career of Erich Leinsdorf.

== Filmography ==
Year	Title	Role	Notes
1937	Not a Word About Love	Fred Curry	
1938	Lidé pod horami	Martin	Uncredited
1938	Menschen in den Bergen	Celedin Martin	
1938	Mirror of Life	Erich Fischerauer	
1939	Hotel Sacher	Herr Stoppling	
1944	To Have and Have Not	Paul de Bursac	
1951	Falschmünzer am Werk		(final film role)
