= Canadian Opera Hall of Fame =

Canadian opera music recognition

Coordinates: 45.50890°N 73.56740°W

The Canadian Opera Hall of Fame is a hall of fame recognizing individuals who have played a role in the development of opera music in Canada. The first honorees were inducted in 1991. Honorees include Clarice Carson and Irving Guttman. The Hall of Fame is directed by L'Opéra de Montréal.
