= Maralin Niska =

American opera singer (1926-2016)

Maralin Niska (November 16, 1926 – July 9, 2016) was an American operatic soprano. Well known as a singing-actress, she was a mainstay of the New York City Opera during the 1960s and 1970s. She was also a regular performer at the Metropolitan Opera from 1970 to 1977.

== Early life, education, and early career ==
Born in San Pedro, California, Niska earned a Bachelor of English Literature from the University of California, Los Angeles and began her professional life as a second grade public school teacher for seven years. She then returned to school to study voice at the Thornton School of Music at the University of Southern California and U.C.L.A. She studied under Louise Mansfield, Lotte Lehmann, Vladimir Rosing, and Ernest St. John Metz. She performed extensively in southern California during the 1950s, including performances with the USC Opera, UCLA Opera, Los Angeles Opera, Riverside Opera Association, Redlands Bowl and other regional companies. Her extensive national and international career began at the opening of the Metropolitan Opera National Company as Susannah in the Carlisle Floyd work in Indianapolis in 1965. After retiring from the stage, she lived in Santa Fe, New Mexico, and was married to William Mullen.

== New York City Opera ==
The soprano was first heard at the New York City Opera in the fall of 1967, as the Contessa Almaviva in Le nozze di Figaro, with Norman Treigle in the title role. She went on to perform with that company in many productions, including La bohème (now as Musetta), La traviata (opposite Plácido Domingo), Madama Butterfly, Pagliacci, Suor Angelica, Faust (in a production by Frank Corsaro, with whom she would often collaborate), Prince Igor, The Turn of the Screw (as the Governess), La bohème (as Mimì, with George Shirley and Carol Neblett), The Makropoulos Case (with Harry Theyard and Chester Ludgin, directed by Corsaro), Susannah (with Treigle), Tosca (with José Carreras), Don Giovanni (as Donna Anna, conducted by Bruno Maderna), Don Giovanni (now as Donna Elvira, with Richard Fredricks and Richard Stilwell alternating in the name part), Ariadne auf Naxos (as the Composer, staged by Sarah Caldwell), Médée (in the Italian version), Manon Lescaut, Salome (conducted by Julius Rudel), Idomeneo (as Elettra), a double-bill of Cavalleria rusticana and Pagliacci (in which she sang both Santuzza and Nedda), La voix humaine, La fanciulla del West, Die Fledermaus (as Rosalinde), and Maria Stuarda (as Elisabetta). In all she sang 29 leading roles with the company, the most of any singer in its history.

== Metropolitan Opera ==
Niska debuted at the Metropolitan Opera in 1970, in La traviata, and went on to appear in La bohème (as Musetta, with Montserrat Caballé, Franco Corelli, and Matteo Manuguerra), Tosca, Les vêpres siciliennes (in John Dexter's production, with Domingo, Sherrill Milnes, and Paul Plishka, conducted by James Levine), and Salome (with Astrid Varnay, conducted by Erich Leinsdorf). On March 15, 1977, Niska sang Musetta in La bohème, for the first of the series, "Live From the Met," with Renata Scotto and Luciano Pavarotti. She then sang Pagliacci with the company. Her final performance with the Met was on their 1978 tour to Wolf Trap Farm Park, in Don Giovanni, in which she portrayed Donna Elvira opposite James Morris, Rockwell Blake, Roberta Peters, Donald Gramm, and John Macurdy. The soprano sang with various other companies in America, as well.

== Videography ==
- Puccini: La bohème (Scotto, Pavarotti, Wixell, Monk, Plishka, Tajo; Levine, Melano, 1977) [live] Deutsche Grammophon
