= The Taming of the Shrew (Giannini) =

The Taming of the Shrew is an opera in three acts by composer Vittorio Giannini. The work uses an English language libretto by Dorothy Fee and the composer which is based on William Shakespeare's play of the same name. The opera premiered at the Cincinnati Music Hall on January 31, 1953 in a concert performance starring Dorothy Short as Katharina, Robert Kircher as Petruchio, the Cincinnati Symphony Orchestra, and conductor Thor Johnson. Considered Giannini's most popular work, it was one of three finalists named for the Pulitzer Prize for Music in 1953.

== Composition and later performances ==
Giannini began composing The Taming of the Shrew in 1938 while finishing work on his earlier opera, The Scarlet Letter. He worked sporadically on the opera over the next 12 years; often interrupted by a variety of other music projects and distractions related to World War II that took his attention away from the project. He completed The Taming of the Shrew in 1950.

In 1954 the NBC Opera Theater filmed a shortened 90 minute version of the opera for television starring John Raitt as Petruchio and Susan Yager as Katharina under the baton of Peter Herman Adler. It was broadcast nationwide in the United States on March 13, 1954 and was notably the first opera to be telecast in color. The production won an award from the New York Film Critics Circle for this technical achievement.

In 1958 the New York City Opera became the first company to stage a full production of the opera with director Margaret Webster and Adler as conductor. Phyllis Curtin and Walter Cassel led the cast. In 1971 the Lyric Opera of Kansas City staged and recorded the opera for New World Records under music director Russell Patterson. In 1979 the Wolf Trap Opera staged the work with singers Julian Patrick (Petruchio) and Anna Moffo (Katharina).

== Roles ==
Role	Voice type	New York City Opera Cast, 13 April 1958 (Conductor: Peter Herman Adler)
Katharina	soprano	Phyllis Curtin
Petruchio	baritone	Walter Cassel
Baptista	bass	Chester Watson
Bianca	soprano	Sonia Stolin
Lucentio	tenor	John Alexander
Hortensio	baritone	Walter Farrell
Gremio	baritone	Keith Kaldenberg
Grumio	tenor	Grant Williams
Vincentio	baritone	Arthur Newman
Tranio	baritone	Paul Ukena
Biondello	baritone	John Gillaspy
Curtis	bass	George Del Monte
A pedant	tenor	Jack De Lon
A tailor	baritone	John Wheeler

== Recordings ==
- Vittorio Giannini: The Taming of the Shrew; Lyric Opera of Kansas City Orchestra and Chorus, conductor Russell Patterson; Mary Jennings (Katharina), Adair McGowen (Petruchio), J. B. Davis (Baptista), Lowell Harris (Lucentio), Walter Hook (Hortensio), Catherine Christensen (Bianca); (New World Records, 1971)
