= Luigi Ricci (vocal coach) =

Italian assistant conductor, accompanist, vocal coach, and author

Luigi Ricci (1893–1981) was an Italian assistant conductor, accompanist, vocal coach, and author.

== Career ==
Ricci began studying music as a child and at age twelve started accompanying voice lessons given by the famous baritone Antonio Cotogni, who had performed several of Giuseppe Verdi's operas under the composer's supervision. At this early age, Ricci began taking meticulous notes on traditions, which Cotogni was passing on to him from work with 19th-century composers and conductors.

Ricci became an assistant conductor with the Rome Opera House and in that capacity worked eight years with Giacomo Puccini and thirty-four years with Pietro Mascagni. Other composers with whom he was associated include Ottorino Respighi, Umberto Giordano, Riccardo Zandonai, and Ildebrando Pizzetti. Among the many great conductors with whom he worked were Gino Marinuzzi, Vittorio Gui, Ettore Panizza, Tullio Serafin, Victor de Sabata; as well as singers such as Ezio Pinza, Beniamino Gigli, Toti dal Monte, Giacomo Lauri-Volpi, Maria Caniglia, Tito Gobbi to name but a few. The latter, for instance, in his writings speaks very warmly about Ricci as an understanding and profoundly thinking professional.

Ricci was the author of a collection of four volumes on "Variations, Cadenzas, and Traditions", and of two books "Puccini interprete da se stesso", and "34 anni con Pietro Mascagni". He collaborated on the musical direction of forty-two films and on numerous opera recordings with RCA.

Ricci was also active as a vocal coach at the Accademia Nazionale di Santa Cecilia, where he taught (amongst many others) Sesto Bruscantini, Richard Miller, Anna Moffo, Rosalind Elias, Ezio Flagello, Joanna Bruno, Jean Bonhomme, Peter Lindroos, Lucia Aliberti and Martti Wallén.

== Selected works ==
Compositions

- Variazioni-Cadenze Tradizioni per Canto. Vol. I: Voci Femminili (Ricordi)
- Variazioni-Cadenze Tradizioni per Canto. Vol. II: Voci Maschili (Ricordi)
- Variazioni-Cadenze Tradizioni per Canto. Appendice N.1: Voci Miste (Ricordi)
- Variazioni-Cadenze Tradizioni per Canto. Appendice N.2: Variazioni e Cadenze di G. Rossini (Ricordi)

Books and articles

- Maestri, gole e... gola. Roma, G. Ricordi, 1947. [Memoirs]
- Puccini interprete di se stesso, Ricordi Milan, (1954) 2003. ISBN 88-7592-725-1
- 34 anni con Pietro Mascagni, Edizioni Curci, 1976.
- "Fleta e le note filate presente Puccini", Rassegna musicale, Vol. 30, no. 2, April 1977

== Recording ==
- Giuseppe Verdi: Il trovatore (Stella Roman (Soprano); Silvia Sawyer (Mezzo Soprano); Anna Marcangeli (Soprano); Gino Sarri (Tenor); Antonio Manca Serra (Baritone); Vittorio Tatozzi (Baritone); Nino Mazziotti (Baritone); Rome Opera House Chorus and Orchestra; Conductor: Luigi Ricci) CD Label: Preiser Records
