= Mirror of Life =

1938 Austrian drama film

- German: Spiegel des Lebens
- Directed by: Géza von Bolváry
- Written by: Julius Sandmeier
- Produced by: Paula Wessely
- Starring: Peter Petersen; Paula Wessely; Attila Hörbiger
- Cinematography: Werner Brandes
- Edited by: Hermann Haller
- Music by: Hans Lang
- Production company: Vienna-Filmproduktion
- Distributed by: Tobis Film
- Release dates: 8 June 1938 (Germany); 16 February 1940 (USA)
- Running time: 95 minutes
- Country: Austria
- Language: German

Mirror of Life (German: Spiegel des Lebens) is a 1938 Austrian drama film directed by Géza von Bolváry and starring Peter Petersen, Paula Wessely, and Attila Hörbiger. The film's sets were overseen by art director Julius von Borsody.

== Cast ==
- Peter Petersen as Karfreit, Jeweller
- Paula Wessely as Johanna 'Hanna' Karfreit, seine Tochter
- Attila Hörbiger as Dr. Peter Eberle
- Raoul Aslan as Prof.Tlusty
- Karl Ehmann as Studienrat Waser
- Maria Eis as Maud Musil
- Alfred Neugebauer as Dr. Haerdtl, Arzt
- Dagny Servaes as Kathi, Gastwirtswitwe
- Karl Skraup as Ebeseder, 'Schusterdoktor'
- Walter Szurovy as Erich Fischerauer
- Jane Tilden as Liesl Janisch
- Lina Woiwode as Marie, economist
- Gisa Wurm as caretaker
- Helen Fichtmüller as customer in the jewelry store
- Claude Daltys as singer in the French version
- Josy Kleinpeter as Franzl, boy
- Eduard Loibner as Gamekeeper Mayer
