= Olga Averino =

Russian opera singer (1895–1989)

Olga Averino circa 1933

Olga Averino (November 15, 1895 – January 17, 1989) was a Russian-born soprano and voice teacher. A white émigré to the United States in the wake of the Russian Civil War, she was prominent in the musical life of Boston for over 60 years, first as a singer and later as a distinguished voice teacher.

== Biography ==
Olga Averino was born into a family of musicians in Moscow in 1895. Her father, Nicholas Averino, was a violist and director of the music conservatory in Rostov. Her mother, Olga Laroche, was a pianist, the daughter of the Russian musicologist Herman Laroche and the god-daughter of the composer Pyotr Ilyich Tchaikovsky. Averino herself was the god-daughter of the composer's brother Modest Ilyich Tchaikovsky. She trained in piano and voice at the Moscow Conservatory and married the violinist Paul Fedorovsky.

In 1918, the Bolshevik Revolution and ensuing civil war led the young couple to flee Russia with their baby daughter. They travelled across Siberia to Vladivostok and down into Manchuria. After living in Beijing for several years, they eventually made their way to the United States, settling in Boston in 1924 where Fedorovsky became a violinist in the Boston Symphony Orchestra. Averino appeared frequently as a soprano soloist.

She was a regular soloist with the Boston Symphony during the Koussvitzky era. Amongst the many works in which she performed there, were Beethoven's 9th Symphony, Bach's Mass in B Minor, Ravel's Sheherazade, Debussy's Martyrdom of St. Sebastian, and the American premiere of Alban Berg's Lied der Lulu. During her long career as a performer she sang in lieder, oratorio and opera and worked with many prominent 20th century composers including Ravel, Schoenberg, Stravinsky, Rachmaninoff, and Glazunov.

She was a noted recitalist and is credited with having established the success of Ravel's Chansons madecasses in the United States. She also toured the United States in a series of joint recitals with the cellist Gregor Piatigorsky, where her accompanist was Alexander Siloti, the last pupil of Franz Liszt.

Olga Averino taught voice at the Longy School of Music, Middlebury College, Wellesley College, and The New School of Music. She also gave a lecture series at Harvard University. However, she is most closely associated with the Longy School, where she was the head of the voice department from 1938 to 1976, returning occasionally for master classes after her retirement, the last of which she gave in 1987. It was also at the Longy School that she gave her final public recital, at age 74.

Among her many pupils, perhaps the most prominent was American soprano, Phyllis Curtin, who studied voice with Averino at Wellesley College during the 1940s. Curtin said of her teacher:

Impatient of sloppy musicianship, demanding emotional commitment, she gave me a vision of the art of singing that led me the rest of my life. On the few occasions when she sang, I learned what a great singing artist is.

Her charismatic teaching style was also recalled by composer and critic, Greg Sandow, who studied under her at the Longy School:

[She] would bring her students all together for a class. Somebody would sing, and, in her Russian accent, Olga typically would ask, 'What emotion does the person in the song feel?' 'The person in the song is angry,' the student would reply. 'But which kind of anger?' Olga would demand, and then sing the opening of the song six times, in six precisely differentiated shades of anger, as distinct as six different people.

Olga Averino and Paul Fedorovsky's daughter Irina Lasoff (1918 – 2006) became a noted choreographer and teacher.

== Last years ==
Following her husband's death in 1958, Averino moved from their home in Boston's Back Bay to an apartment in Cambridge where she continued to teach private pupils until a few days before her death. Olga Averino died in her sleep in Cambridge at the age of 93.

== Recordings ==
- South American Chamber Music (Soprano Olga Averino, Violinist Alfredo St Malo, Cellist Fritz Magg, Pianist-Arranger Nicolas Slonimsky) Columbia Records, 1941.
- French Songs (Soprano Olga Averino), Victor records, 1940.

== Book ==
Olga Averino, Principles and Art of Singing, Novis, 1989 ISBN 87-89389-01-8

Averino wrote Principles and Art of Singing in the late 1970s and continued to revise it through 1987, circulating mimeographed copies among her students and friends. The book, edited by her daughter, Irina Lasoff, was finally published posthumously in late 1989. The final words of the book are a summation of her teaching philosophy:

Singing is an expression of life, and if you have no time for your life, how can you sing? Quality always needs time, not only in music but also in life itself.
