= Metropolitan Opera National Company =

The Metropolitan Opera National Company (MONC) was a short lived American opera company that operated from 1965 to 1967 as a second touring company of the Metropolitan Opera that featured American and Canadian artists in their early stages of career development. While operationally part of the Metropolitan Opera's budget, it was co-sponsored by the John F. Kennedy Center for the Performing Arts. Led by mezzo-soprano Risë Stevens, the company's roster of artists included many prominent opera singers of the second half of the 20th century in the early part of their careers.

== History ==
Envisioned by Anthony Bliss, a prominent New York lawyer and president of the Metropolitan Opera Association, support of the MONC's formation was spearheaded by President John F. Kennedy who announced the project in 1963. Responding to the president's call for support of the company, philanthropist and publisher Lila Acheson Wallace donated the bulk of the company's finances during it operational history. While Metropolitan Opera director Rudolf Bing publicly expressed support for the project, privately he derided the idea and resented the board's actions in creating the company. In his 1972 autobiography, 5000 Nights at the Opera, Bing haughtily devalued the National Company as "an expression of the typical American weakness for doing something -- anything -- for education and the young."

As director of the Met, Bing was responsible for establishing the leadership of the MONC, and he appointed Met mezzo-soprano Risë Stevens and Michael Manuel, a long time stage manager and director at the Met, as directors of the company in 1963. Stevens, who retired from the stage in 1961, was the Artistic Director and musical director of the company who exhibited a passion for mentoring the young artists in the company. Manuel took over the administrative duties of the company, served as stage manager and coordinator of the physical aspects of the company's sets, costumes, and supportive staff.

Stevens and Manuel spent a year auditioning singers before the MONC finally began rehearsals in the summer of 1965. Among the young singers contracted with the company, many in their first professional engagements, included sopranos Clarice Carson, Maralin Niska, Mary Beth Peil, Francesca Roberto, and Marilyn Zschau; mezzo-sopranos Joy Davidson, Sylvia Friederich, Dorothy Krebill, and Huguette Tourangeau; tenors Enrico Di Giuseppe, James Carson, Chris Lachona, Nicholas di Virgilio, and Harry Theyard; baritones Ron Bottcher, John Fiorito, Thomas Jamerson, Julian Patrick, and Vern Shinall; bass-baritones Andrij Dobriansky, Ronald Hedlund, and Arnold Voketaitis; and bass Paul Plishka.

The first season of the MONC included 260 performances in 72 cities over a nine-month period from September 1965 through May 1966. This season included a production of Carlisle Floyd's Susannah that was directed by José Quintero and used sets designed by Beni Montresor; Rossini's La Cenerentola with a staging by Günther Rennert and Joy Davidson as Cinderella; Giacomo Puccini's Madama Butterfly with designs by Yoshio Aoyama and Francesca Roberto as Cio-Cio San; and Georges Bizet's Carmen with a staging by Louis Ducreux and designs by Bernard Daydé. The company made its debut on September 29, 1965 at the Clowes Memorial Hall at Butler University in Indianapolis with Maralin Niska as Floyd's Susannah.

The second season of the MONC ran from September 1966 through May 1967 with performances of Giuseppe Verdi's La traviata, Puccini's La bohème, Mozart's The Marriage of Figaro and Benjamin Britten's The Rape of Lucretia. A planned third season in 1967-1968 of performances of Tosca, Rigoletto and The Barber of Seville, never occurred as Rudolf Bing successfully worked to undermine support for the company with Metropolitan Opera's board of directors who voted to discontinue the company beyond the second season in December 1966.
