= Wine, Women and Horses =

1937 film by Louis King

- Theatrical release poster
- Directed by: Louis King
- Screenplay by: Roy Chanslor
- Based on: Dark Hazard; 1933 novel by W. R. Burnett
- Produced by: Bryan Foy
- Starring: Barton MacLane; Ann Sheridan; Dick Purcell; Peggy Bates; Walter Cassel; Lottie Williams
- Cinematography: James Van Trees
- Edited by: Jack Saper
- Music by: Howard Jackson
- Production company: Warner Bros. Pictures
- Distributed by: Warner Bros. Pictures
- Release date: September 11, 1937
- Running time: 64 minutes
- Country: United States
- Language: English

Wine, Women and Horses is a 1937 American drama film directed by Louis King and written by Roy Chanslor. The film stars Barton MacLane, Ann Sheridan, Dick Purcell, Peggy Bates, Walter Cassel and Lottie Williams. It is based on the 1933 novel Dark Hazard by W. R. Burnett. The film was released by Warner Bros. Pictures on September 11, 1937. The screenplay concerns a gambler who tries to reform.

== Plot ==
His gal pal Valerie buys compulsive gambler Jim Turner a meal after he goes broke. Jim takes off for points unknown and, stopping in a small Midwest town, he wins $20 off of George Mayhew in a game of horseshoes, then returns the money when he learns George can't afford to lose it. Jim rents a room from the Mayhews who run a boarding house and takes a liking to George's sister, Marjorie. The feeling is mutual, despite Marjorie's reservations about Jim's life as a gambler. She spurns her beau Pres to marry Jim. Jim promises to get a job and does, as a Chicago hotel's night manager. Becoming disgruntled with his boss, Jim goes out early Christmas morning and wins $3,000 gambling. A hotel guest, Bright, notices Jim's success and offers him a job looking after his racehorses in California. Jim accepts and, promising Marjorie his gambling days are over, they move to California.

Though not gambling, Jim spends his time at the track cheering on Bright's mare, Lady Luck. Jim runs into Valerie while he and Marjorie are at the track, and the two ladies are introduced. Marjorie becomes upset after Jim tells her Valerie gave him some of her winnings and she retires for the evening. Jim leaves with Valerie and her escort, Broadway Willis, and the three go out with Jim winning $20,000 gambling. However, Marjorie leaves Jim a note telling him she can't live with him anymore, she is pregnant; and, she is returning home. Marjorie re-connects with Pres.

Jim returns to the Mayhew house and is told by George that Jim's and Marjorie's baby boy died. Marjorie intercepts Jim as he leaves and discovers he is in one of his "down" periods as a gambler and headed east. Jim promises to quit gambling and get a job. Working at a cigar store, he runs in to George who has now become a professional gambler working at the local track. George tells Jim the mare, Lady Luck, is racing there. The horse injures its leg, throwing its rider. Jim buys the horse to prevent it from being destroyed. Jim rehabilitates Lady Luck, but is fired from his job at the cigar store. Jim realizes his lifestyle will never make him a good husband; that Marjorie yearns for the stability Pres can give her; and, he leaves. Jim returns to his gambling ways and reunites with Valerie.

== Cast ==
- Barton MacLane as Jim Turner
- Ann Sheridan as Valerie
- Dick Purcell as George Mayhew
- Peggy Bates as Marjorie Mayhew
- Walter Cassel as Pres. Barrow
- Lottie Williams as Mrs. Mayhew
- Kenneth Harlan as Bright
- Charley Foy as Broadway Willis
- Eugene Jackson as Eight Ball
- Archie Robbins as Joe

== See also ==
- List of films about horses
- List of films about horse racing
