= The Most Important Man =

Opera by Gian Carlo Menotti

- Opera by Gian Carlo Menotti
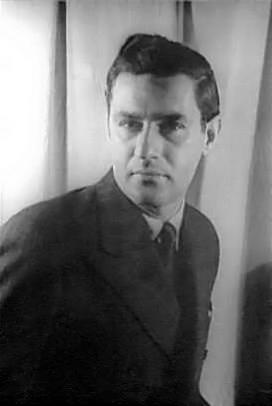
- The composer in 1944
- Librettist: Gian Carlo Menotti
- Language: English
- Premiere: March 12, 1971; New York City Opera

The Most Important Man is an opera in three acts with music and libretto by Gian Carlo Menotti. Commissioned by Julius Rudel for the New York City Opera, the work premiered at Lincoln Center in 1971 in a production directed by Menotti with sets designed by Oliver Smith and costumes by Frank Thompson. An opera focusing on racial tensions in Africa with a central black hero, the work was poorly received by most critics. However, Menotti personally believed that this was one of his best operas on par with The Consul and The Saint of Bleecker Street. The work's first European performance was at the Teatro Lirico Giuseppe Verdi in Trieste, Italy, on January 17, 1972. The opera uses Menotti's characteristic lyrical style which is inspired by Puccini and the Italian verismo opera tradition. In this work he infuses African percussion and rhythms, much in the way Puccini infused Asian inspired melodies and musical practices into his opera Madama Butterfly.

== Roles ==
Roles, voice types, premiere cast
Role	Voice type	Premiere cast, 12 March 1971 Conductor: Christopher Keene
Toime Ukamba, a scientist and Native African	baritone	Eugene Holmes
Dr. Otto Arnek, a white scientist and Toime's teacher	tenor	Harry Theyard
Leona Arnek, Otto's wife	mezzo-soprano	Beverly Wolff
Cora Arnek, Otto and Leona's daughter	soprano	Joanna Bruno
Eric Rupert, Dr. Arnek's laboratory assistant	baritone	Richard Stilwell
Mrs. Agebda Akawasi	soprano	Delores Jones
Professor Clement, a scientist	tenor	John Lankston
Professor Risselberg, a scientist	tenor	Joaquin Romaguera
Professor Bolental, a scientist	baritone	Thomas Jamerson
Professor Grippel, a scientist	bass	Don Yule

== Plot ==
Setting: Racially segregated 20th-century colonial Africa

Native African Toime Ukamba is a scientist and former pupil of Dr. Arnek, a white man who is one of few white individuals who treats the African natives with respect, kindness, and dignity. Unable to find work due to racial prejudice, Toime drinks heavily and becomes a thief. Dr. Arnek confronts Toime on his self destructive behavior, and encourages him to pursue his significant intellectual gifts. Toime stops drinking and stealing and applies himself to his studies in chemistry, leading to the discovery of a valuable scientific formula that will bring wealth to his nation and enable him to become "the most important man". After revealing the formula which will enable him to alter the world to a group of white scientists, a power struggle over how the formula will be used and who will take credit for it ensues as the scientists attempt to take the formula from Ukamba. Ukamba flees into the wilds of the African savannah with Cora, the daughter of Dr. Arnek, with whom he has fallen in love. Dr. Arnek's wife, Leona, and his other white assistant, Eric Rupert, are distraught over Cora's assignation with a black man. They scheme against the couple and ultimately use the tools of the "white state" to thwart the happiness of the couple. Toime is tragically disgraced and killed, but not before he burns his research. This leaves Dr. Arnek as the "most important man" as he is now the only one who has seen Ukamba's research and knows the important formula. The opera ends with the other scientists demanding Dr. Arnek divulge the formula held within his mind. Will he divulge it?
