= Joanna Bruno =

American operatic soprano (born 1944)

Joanna Mary Bruno (born 1944), also known as Joanna Bruno-Clarke, is an American operatic soprano who had an active international career during the 1960s and 1970s. A lyric soprano, she often performed in operas by Giacomo Puccini and Wolfgang Amadeus Mozart.

In the United States, she performed frequently with the Santa Fe Opera and the New York City Opera, and in Europe she performed in multiple operas with the Dutch National Opera and the Scottish Opera among others. She is best remembered for her performances in the operas of Gian Carlo Menotti, notably creating the role of Cora Arnek in the world premiere of Menotti's The Most Important Man in 1971.

== Life and career ==
Born in West Orange, New Jersey, Bruno began her vocal music studies with Katherine Eastment in New Jersey. She studied opera with Jennie Tourel at the Juilliard School where she graduated as an undergraduate student in 1967.

She continued graduate studies at the Juilliard Opera Center with whom she performed in the United States premieres of Francesco Cavalli's Ormindo (as Nerillo in 1968) and Arthur Honegger's Antigone. She later pursued further studies in opera with Luigi Ricci at the Accademia Nazionale di Santa Cecilia in Rome. She was an apprentice artist with the Santa Fe Opera in 1967, and she performed the role of Susanna in Mozart's The Marriage of Figaro at the Aspen Music Festival while a student at the Aspen Opera Center in 1966.

Bruno made her professional opera debut in 1968 as Monica in Menotti's The Medium at the Festival dei Due Mondi in Spoleto, Italy.

In 1969, she was the soprano soloist in Carl Nielsen Symphony No. 3 with the Boston Symphony Orchestra under conductor Henry Lewis. During the 1970s, she made numerous appearances with the Santa Fe Opera (SFO), including portraying Susanna to Kiri Te Kanawa's Countess in Te Kanawa's American debut in 1971. In 1971, she was also a soloist with the Naumburg Orchestral Concerts, in the Naumburg Bandshell, Central Park, in the summer series.

Other roles she sang with the SFO include Anna Truelove in Igor Stravinsky's The Rake's Progress (1970); Pamina in Mozart's The Magic Flute (1971); Mimì in Puccini's La bohème (1973); Despina in Mozart's Così fan tutte (1975) and Micaëla in Bizet's Carmen (1975) She later returned to the SFO in 2004 to portray the maidservant in Giuseppe Verdi's Simon Boccanegra.

She performed frequently with the New York City Opera (NYCO) during the 1970s portraying roles like Mimì and Micaela among others. With the NYCO she notably created the role of Cora Arnek in the world premiere of Menotti's The Most Important Man in 1971. Another Menotti role she tackled was Sardula in Menotti's The Last Savage at the Hawaii Opera Theatre in 1973.

Other career highlights in North America included performances of Mimì at the Lyric Opera of Chicago in 1972 and at the Houston Grand Opera in 1975 with José Carreras as her Rodolfo. She returned to Houston in 1976 as Monica in Menotti's The Medium.

In Europe, Bruno performed in several productions with the Dutch National Opera in 1970s, including portrayals of Mimì (1970), Anna Truelove in The Rake's Progress (1972) and Nanetta in Giuseppe Verdi's Falstaff (1972, 1973). The company took the production to the Holland Festival in 1973. She also performed in many productions with the Scottish Opera, appearing as Mimì (1974, 1976); Desdemona in Giuseppe Verdi's Otello (1976, 1977), and Cio-Cio-San in Puccini's Madama Butterfly (1976, 1978). In 1972 she sang Menotti's Cora at the Teatro Lirico Giuseppe Verdi in Trieste, Italy. She performed the role of Mussetta in Puccini's La bohème at the Palais Garnier for the Paris Opera in 1973 and 1974 with conductor Aldo Ceccato and Robert Kerns as her Marcello.

After the late 1970s, Bruno's professional engagements became rare. In 1975, she was diagnosed with bipolar disorder, an illness that impacted the sustainability of her career. In 1982, she married fellow Juilliard School alumnus Vincent Clarke, a pianist and organist. She pursued graduate studies in vocal pedagogy at Westminster Choir College and is a voice teacher. In 2001, she gave a concert of opera arias with the New Jersey State Opera.
