= Don Yule =

American opera singer (1935–2015)

Don Yule (January 28, 1935, Enid, Oklahoma — July 3, 2015, Brooklyn, New York City) was an American operatic bass who performed regularly with the New York City Opera (NYCO) for fifty years. A graduate of the Jacobs School of Music at Indiana University Bloomington, he joined the New York City Opera in 1960 where he made his debut as Gluttony in a revival of Hugo Weisgall’s Six Characters in Search of an Author. He went on to perform in a total of 83 roles with the NYCO in more than 1,700 performances, most often in comprimario parts. Some of the roles he was associated with included Alcindoro and Benoit in Giacomo Puccini's La Bohème, Antonio and Bartolo in Mozart's The Marriage of Figaro, Dr. Grenvil in Giuseppe Verdi's La Traviata, and the Jailer and the Sacristan in Puccini's Tosca.

Yule notably created the role of Professor Grippel in the world premiere of Gian Carlo Menotti's The Most Important Man in 1971. In 1982 he portrayed the Huntsman and the Bulgarian Soldier in Hal Prince's celebrated revival of Leonard Bernstein's Candide which was filmed for national broadcast on PBS's Live from Lincoln Center. He later performed the roles of the First Inquisitioner, Don, and Judge on the New York City Opera's recording of the work which won the Grammy Award for Best Opera Recording in 1987. His final performance with the NYCO was in 2010. He died at his home in Brooklyn in 2015 at the age of 80.
