= Rosalind Elias =

American mezzo-soprano (1930–2020)

- Born: March 13, 1930; Lowell, Massachusetts, U.S.
- Died: May 3, 2020 (aged 90); New York City, New York, U.S.
- Education: New England Conservatory; Accademia di Santa Cecilia
- Occupation: Opera singer
- Years active: 1948–2020
- Spouse: Zyhayr Moghrabi (m. 1969; died 2015)

Rosalind Elias (March 13, 1930 – May 3, 2020) was an American mezzo-soprano who enjoyed a long and distinguished career at the Metropolitan Opera. She was best known for creating the role of Erika in Samuel Barber's Vanessa in 1958.

== Early life ==
Rosalind Elias was born in Lowell, Massachusetts, the 13th and youngest child of a Lebanese-American family. Her parents, Shelaby Namay and Salem Elias, immigrated from Beirut and her father worked as a real estate agent for some time. Elias grew up listening to Saturday broadcasts of the Metropolitan Opera while doing chores. Her father was initially opposed to her performing, but she pleaded for lessons. She received her first singing lessons in Lowell from Miss Lillian Sullivan. She studied at the New England Conservatory. She appeared with the New England Opera from 1948 to 1952. She then left for Italy to complete her vocal studies at the Accademia Nazionale di Santa Cecilia in Rome, with Luigi Ricci and Nazzareno De Angelis. As a student she sang Poppaea in L'incoronazione di Poppea and appeared with the Boston Symphony Orchestra. She continued her studies at the Berkshire Music Center at Tanglewood in Massachusetts.

== Career ==
=== Metropolitan Opera ===
Elias made her Metropolitan Opera debut as Grimgerde in Wagner's Die Walküre, on February 23, 1954. She sang 687 performances of 54 roles there, including Bersi in Giordano's Andrea Chénier, the title role in Bizet's Carmen, Rosina in The Barber of Seville, Laura in La Gioconda, Suzuki in Madama Butterfly, Siebel in Faust, Nancy in Martha, Cherubino and Marcellina in The Marriage of Figaro, Dorabella in Così fan tutte, Octavian in Der Rosenkavalier, Olga in Eugene Onegin, Marina in Boris Godunov, Fenena in Nabucco, Azucena in Il trovatore, Amneris in Aida, Charlotte in Werther, and The Witch in Hansel and Gretel. She created the role of Erika in Samuel Barber's opera Vanessa on January 15, 1958, and the role of Charmian in Antony and Cleopatra by the same composer, for the opening of new Metropolitan Opera House at Lincoln Center, on September 16, 1966.

=== Other opera houses and performances ===
Elias also performed abroad, notably as La Cenerentola with Scottish Opera in 1970, as Carmen at the Vienna State Opera in 1972, and as Baba the Turk in Stravinsky's The Rake's Progress at the Glyndebourne Festival in 1975.

In the realm of live broadcasting, Elias' performance as Bathsheba under the direction of Alfredo Antonini for CBS Television's premiere of Ezra Laderman's opera And David Wept, earned Ellias critical acclaim in 1971.

Elias made numerous recordings primarily for RCA Victor during the 1960s, including Cherubino in The Marriage of Figaro under Erich Leinsdorf, Preziosilla in La forza del destino and Laura in La Gioconda, both opposite Zinka Milanov, Giuseppe Di Stefano and Leonard Warren, Suzuki in Madama Butterfly twice, first opposite Anna Moffo in 1957, and then opposite Leontyne Price in 1962, Azucena in Il trovatore opposite Leontyne Price, Richard Tucker, Giorgio Tozzi, as well as Maddalena in Rigoletto, Meg Page in Falstaff (both under Georg Solti in 1963) and Judith in Bartók's Bluebeard's Castle. She was the mezzo/contralto soloist in concert works like Berlioz's Roméo et Juliette and the Verdi Requiem. The recording of 'Figaro' under Leinsdorf won a Grammy for Best Classical Performance, Opera Cast or Choral, at the Second Annual Grammy Awards, November 29, 1959.

In 1984, Elias made her New York City Opera debut as Mrs. Lovett in a return engagement of Hal Prince’s original staging of Stephen Sondheim‘s Sweeney Todd: The Demon Barber of Fleet Street.

In later years, Elias assumed the role of the Old Baroness in Vanessa, first performing the work at the Opéra de Monte-Carlo, and later at the Los Angeles Opera in 2004 and at the New York City Opera in 2007.

Still in lustrous voice, Elias played the role of "Heidi Schiller" in a new revival of James Goldman and Stephen Sondheim's 1971 musical Follies, which ran at the John F. Kennedy Center for the Performing Arts from May 7, 2011, to June 19, 2011. She made her Broadway debut when the musical transferred to Broadway in a limited engagement from August 2011 through January 22, 2012.

=== Directing ===
At the end of the 20th century, she turned to directing operas, including Carmen at the San Diego Opera.

== Personal life ==
She married Lebanese-American attorney and law professor Zyhayr Moghrabi in 1969. They remained married until his death in 2015.

She had her name and social security number tattooed on her abdomen in case of a disaster.

=== Death ===
Elias, who had been diagnosed with congestive heart failure in 2019, was admitted to Mount Sinai West on April 30, 2020, after suffering breathing problems. She died on May 3, at age 90.

== Videography ==
- James Levine's 25th Anniversary Metropolitan Opera Gala (1996), Deutsche Grammophon DVD, B0004602-09

== Sources ==
- D. Hamilton (ed.),The Metropolitan Opera Encyclopedia: A Complete Guide to the World of Opera (Simon and Schuster, New York 1987). ISBN 0-671-61732-X
- The Complete Dictionary of Opera & Operetta, James Anderson. ISBN 0-517-09156-9
- The Metropolitan Opera Archives
