= Walter Cassel =

American baritone and actor

Walter Cassel (May 15, 1910 – July 3, 2000) was an American operatic baritone and actor. He began his career singing on the radio during the mid-1930s and appeared in a couple of Hollywood musical films in the late 1930s. He made his first stage appearances in a handful of Broadway productions during the late 1930s and early 1940s. He began his opera career at the Metropolitan Opera in 1942, and went on to have a long and fruitful association with that house that lasted until his retirement from the stage in 1974. In addition to working with the Met, Cassel was also a regular performer with the New York City Opera between 1948 and 1969 and worked frequently as a freelance artist with important opera companies on the international stage as well as in the United States.

== Biography ==
Born John Walter Cassel in Council Bluffs, Iowa, Cassel began his musical education studying the trumpet while at Thomas Jefferson High School. He began taking private voice lessons with Harry McGee Cooper after joining his high school's glee club during his senior year. In 1933, while studying dentistry at Creighton University, Cassel was provided with the opportunity to sing for renowned baritone Lawrence Tibbett after attending one of Tibbet's recitals in Omaha, Nebraska. Impressed with his performance, Tibbett praised Cassel highly in an interview with the local newspaper and strongly encouraged him to pursue an opera career. Strongly influenced by this encounter, Cassel headed for New York City with just "$40 in his shoe, a pair of coveralls and a briefcase full of music".

Upon reaching New York, Cassel began studying voice with Frank La Forge. Beginning in 1934, he began supporting himself by singing on the radio, including such programs as Air Breaks and Hammerstein's Music Hall. Unable to land work as an opera singer, Cassel tried his luck in Hollywood and managed to land a good sized supporting role in the 1937 film Wine, Women, and Horses which starred Barton MacLane and Ann Sheridan. This was followed by a leading role in the 1938 film Romance Road where his love interest was portrayed by Anne Nagel. Cassel, however, preferred live performance over film work and abandoned his film career after landing a role in the 1938 Broadway play Great Lady. He went on to star in the 1939 musical Stars In Your Eyes and the 1940 musical revue All in Fun. In 1941 he starred in the Los Angeles Civic Light Opera's production of Rio Rita.

In 1942 Cassel auditioned for the Metropolitan Opera and was invited by Edward Johnson to join the roster of singers at the company. He made his debut with the company earlier than expected, replacing an ailing singer at the last minute in the role of Bretigny in Jules Massenet's Manon on December 12, 1942, with Bidu Sayão in the title role. He continued to sing at the Met through the Spring of 1945 in mainly comprimario roles like Count Ceprano in Giuseppe Verdi's Rigoletto, the Gypsy in Verdi's Il trovatore, Hermann in Jacques Offenbach's The Tales of Hoffmann, and the Philosopher in Gustave Charpentier's Louise. He did however get to sing two more sizable roles, Valentin in Charles Gounod's Faust and Silvio in Ruggero Leoncavallo's Pagliacci.

Feeling he was being pigeonholed into the comprimario repertoire at the Met, Cassel left the company after the close of the 1944–1945 season to pursue other artistic interests. He returned to Broadway in 1946 to portray Pierre Birabeau in the revival of Sigmund Romberg's The Desert Song. He had almost made it back to Broadway Best two years earlier when he created the role of Edvard Grieg in Song of Norway for its pre-Broadway run at the Los Angeles Civic Light Opera. However, he left the cast before the show reached Broadway. He made his debut with the Philadelphia La Scala Opera Company as Escamillo in Georges Bizet's Carmen on October 5, 1946, with Bruna Castagna in the title role. On January 11, 1948, he gave his New York City recital debut at Town Hall.

Shortly after his Town Hall recital, Cassel was approached by Laszlo Halasz to join the roster of principal singers at the New York City Opera (NYCO). Cassel jumped at the chance and made his debut with the company on April 1, 1948, as Scarpia in Giacomo Puccini's Tosca opposite Wilma Spence in the title role and Rudolph Petrak as Cavaradossi. This performance was a major critical success for Cassel, with The New York Times proclaiming that, "Walter Cassel's suave enactment of the treacherous Baron was the hit of the evening."

Cassel remained one of the NYCO's leading baritones up through the Fall of 1954, giving a total of 126 performances with the company. He portrayed such roles as Amelia's Husband in Gian Carlo Menotti's Amelia Goes to the Ball, the Count in Wolfgang Amadeus Mozart's Le nozze di Figaro, Dapertutto in The Tales of Hoffmann, Escamillo in Bizet's Carmen, Ford in Verdi's Falstaff, Gerard in Umberto Giordano's Andrea Chénier, Giorgio Germont in Verdi's La traviata, John the Baptist in Richard Strauss's Salome, Ramiro in Maurice Ravel's L'heure espagnole, and the title roles in Mozart's Don Giovanni and Verdi's Rigoletto among others. He notably recorded the role of Valentin in Faust with the NYCO for MGM Records in 1951 and portrayed Petruccio in the world premiere of Vittorio Giannini's The Taming of the Shrew in 1958. He continued to return to NYCO through November 1969.

In 1955 Cassel left the NYCO to rejoin the roster at the Met by the invitation of Rudolf Bing, making his first appearance under his new contract at the house as Scarpia to the Tosca of Renata Tebaldi and Cavaradossi of Giuseppe Campora on March 8, 1955. Cassel remained at the Met up until his retirement from the stage in 1974, being absent at the house during only three seasons of those years. His final and 275th performance at the Met was as Kurwenal in Richard Wagner's Tristan und Isolde with Jess Thomas and Birgit Nilsson in the title roles.

In 1958, he appeared as a contestant on the TV game show To Tell the Truth shortly after he had sung three roles at the Met—Baron Scarpia in Tosca, Kurwenal in Tristan und Isolde and John the Baptist in Salome—within 24 hours. One of the panelists (and the only one who did not correctly identify Cassel) was Ronald Reagan.

While busy singing at the Met, Cassel also worked as a guest artist with many notable opera companies throughout North America and Europe. He appeared with such American companies as the Pittsburgh Opera, Cincinnati Opera, and the New Orleans Opera, as well as several major companies internationally such as the Vienna State Opera, the Deutsche Oper am Rhein, the Liceu, Ottawa Opera, the Canadian Opera Company, the Palacio de Bellas Artes, the Teatro Massimo, and elsewhere. He notably portrayed Horace Tabor in the world premiere of Douglas Moore's The Ballad of Baby Doe at the Central City Opera in 1956. In 1958 he made his debut at the Lyric Opera of Chicago as Kurwenal. In 1959 he was a featured guest on The Bell Telephone Hour. In 1961 he made his debut with the Philadelphia Lyric Opera Company as Friedrich von Telramund in Wagner's Lohengrin.

From 1970 to 1972 Cassel sang the role of Johann Strauss Sr. in Korngold's The Great Waltz in London, and then performed in Italy and Spain for a couple years. After retiring from the stage, Cassel began a long teaching career at Indiana University in 1974. He died at the age of 90 in Bloomington, Indiana.
