= Clarice Carson =

Canadian soprano singer

- Born: Clarice Katz; December 23, 1929; Montreal, Quebec, Canada
- Died: May 2, 2015 (aged 85); Toronto, Ontario, Canada
- Occupation: Soprano singer
- Years active: 1950–1986

Clarice Carson (née Katz; December 23, 1929 – May 2, 2015) was a Canadian soprano singer who made her name in opera from the 1950 to 1986. Born to Polish émigrés in Montreal, she sought to become a signer at an early age and made her public début at the Sarah Fischer Concerts. A first operatic appearance for Carson followed in 1953 and she portrayed various lead roles in performances across the world. She was inducted into the Canadian Opera Hall of Fame in 1998 and became the first Canadian to receive a commemorative plaque at the National Opera Center in New York in 2013.

== Biography ==
She was born Clarice Katz in Montreal, Quebec, on December 23, 1929. She was the daughter of Polish émigrés who were employed in the garment industry. Although Carson's parents desired her to become a bookkeeper, her objective was to sing from an early age. She began studying professional vocal studies with soprano Pauline Donalda and pianist Jacqueline Richard in Montreal at the age of 19, before moving to New York to be taught by Julia Drobner. Katz adopted the local stage name Clarice Carson, which she subsequently adopted as her legal name.

Carson made her public début at the Sarah Fischer Concert series in Montreal in 1956, and later her first operatic appearance at the Opéra de Montréal as the Lady in Waiting in Macbeth three years later. In 1960, she was cast as Micaëla in Carmen and as Siebel in Goethe's Faust three years later. With those roles, Carson received more offers to work in opera. She signed her first major contract with the New York City Opera to be part of its national tour for the 1965–66 season and made her début as the Countess of The Marriage of Figaro. For the 1966–1967 season, Carson accepted a deal to join the Metropolitan Opera National Company. There, she appeared as Violetta in La traviata and the Female Chorus in The Rape of Lucretia. Carson subsequently spent three more seasons from 1967 to 1970 at the Metropolitan Opera, playing the Pamina in The Magic Flute. In December 1968, she came to further attention by portraying Musetta in La bohème, after two of the singers were afflicted by illness. Carson was later cast in Tosca from March to April 1969. Overall, she sang in 63 performances in ten roles at the Metropolitan Opera.

Although she created few recordings of her performances, in 1970, Carson sang the title role of Tosca for CBC Television. That same year, she was cast as the title role in the Vancouver Opera Association's production of Aida. Carson then sang the lead role in Suor Angelica and Giorgietta in Il tabarro for the Opéra du Québec in 1971. The following year, she appeared in New York in a concert version of Les Troyens, and reprised the title role of Tosca for Canadian Opera Company (COC) at the National Arts Centre in Ottawa. Carson was cast as Desdemona in Otello in 'a Opera du Quebec' production in 1973, before returning to New York to partake in the concert edition of Palestrina.

During 1974, Carson portrayed Donna Anna in Don Giovanni, Cio-Cio San in Madama Butterfly and Alice Ford in Falstaff. For the 1975–1976 season, she rejoined the Metropolitan Opera to portray Fiordiligi in Cosi fan tutte. In 1977, Carson returned to the COC and was cast as Elisabeth of Valois in Don Carlos, and débuted with the Manitoba Opera for a second appearance in Don Giovanni. Operatic bass player Paul Plishka invited her to partake in a concert of selections from his most popular repertoires in high school auditoriums in 1978. Two years later, Carson joined the Pittsburgh Opera to sing the role of Donna Anna in Don Giovanni. Other performances that Carson portrayed during her career were Constanze in The Abduction in, Maddalena in Andrea Chénier and the title roles of Salome and Turandot in opera buildings across the world.

She retired from the opera after playing Senta in a production of The Flying Dutchman with the Lyric Opera of Chicago in late 1983. Carson confided in her friend and former manager Ann Summers at the time that, "I'm lonely on the road". Her final stage performance was in 1986, and she began operating a store called Carson-Palmer: Fashion Alternatives on Eglinton Avenue in Toronto, where she rented out formal dresses to women who did not want high-end gowns. Carson also served as an active board member and mentored several young singers with the International Resource Centre for Performing Artists (IRCPA). She died of kidney failure in the afternoon on May 2, 2015, at her home in Toronto.

== Personality and personal life ==
Carson's daughter described her as "extremely intelligent", and a person who was "very generous" and liked to enjoy life. She was familiar to audiences in Ottawa, though she was unable to achieve much recognition and success outside of North America. Carson was a feminist from her childhood. Adrian Waller of the Montreal Gazette noted Carson's "especially large" and "extremely well placed" soprano voice. At the age of 18, Carson married William "Bill" Ornstein and they had two children. The marriage had an amicable conclusion. She later had a short marriage to Greek-American tenor and vocal coach Philon Ktsanes.

== Legacy ==
Joseph So of Opera Canada called Carson "An important figure in Canadian opera history". In December 1998, she was inducted into the Canadian Opera Hall of Fame by the Opéra de Montréal at Place des Arts. In August 2013, Carson received a commemorative plaque at the National Opera Center in New York to acknowledge her career as an international opera soprano, making her the first Canadian to receive such an honour. She donated her musical scores, personal correspondence, program booklets and tape recordings of her performances to the IRCPA library to ensure her work was preserved for future generations.
