= Arnold Voketaitis =

American opera singer (born 1930)

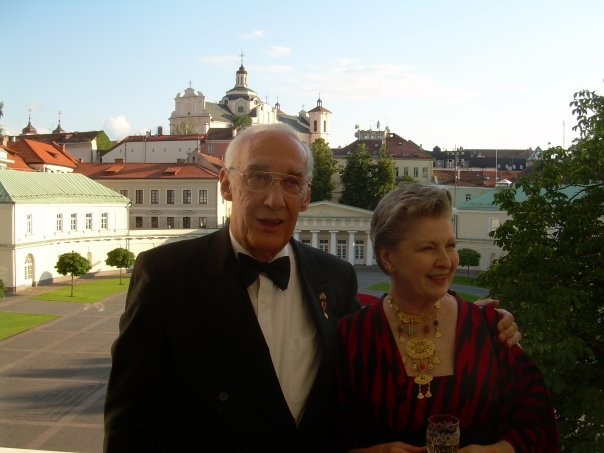
Arnold Voketaitis with his wife Nijole after receiving the Commander's Cross of the Order of the Lithuanian Grand Duke Gediminas at the Presidential Palace in Vilnius, Lithuania in 2009.

Arnold Voketaitis (born May 11, 1930, New Haven, Connecticut) is an American bass-baritone of Lithuanian descent who had an active singing career performing in operas, concerts, and recitals from the late 1950s through the 1990s. He enjoyed a particularly successful partnership with the New York City Opera and has performed with most of the major opera companies in North America.

== Biography ==
Born in Connecticut, Voketaitis is from a Lithuanian family. He graduated from Quinnipiac University where he earned a degree in business administration. He then studied at the Yale School of Drama. Before his singing career, Voketaitis worked as a cars salesman, jazz trumpeter, and a radio announcer. He studied voice under Elda Ercole, Leila Edward and Kurt Saffir in New York City.

Voketaitis began his singing career touring as soloist with the United States Army Band ("Pershing's Own") in 1956. With the Army Band, Voketaitis had the opportunity to perform for President Dwight D. Eisenhower at the White House.

After winning several singing competitions in 1957 along with a Rockefeller Award, Voketaitis made his professional opera debut as Vanuzzi in Richard Strauss's Die schweigsame Frau at the New York City Opera (NYCO) in 1958. The following year he returned to the NYCO to portray "The Stage Manager" in the world premiere of Hugo Weisgall's Six Characters in Search of an Author. Voketaitis remained a regular performer with the NYCO up through 1981, singing such roles as Creon in Igor Stravinsky's Oedipus rex, Olin Blitch in Carlisle Floyd's Susannah, and Theseus in Benjamin Britten's A Midsummer Night's Dream among others. He notably sang the role of the Father in the NYC premiere of Douglas Moore's Carry Nation in 1968.

During the 1960s through the 1990s, Voketaitis appeared as a guest artist at many important opera houses in North America, including the Houston Grand Opera, Milwaukee Opera Theatre, Opéra de Montréal, the Palacio de Bellas Artes, the Pittsburgh Opera, San Antonio Grand Opera Festival, and the Vancouver Opera among others. In 1964 he made his debut with the San Francisco Opera as Mephistophélès in Charles Gounod's Faust. In 1965 he sang Don Magnifico with the Metropolitan Opera National Company. He sang regularly with the Lyric Opera of Chicago between 1968 and 1989, portraying such roles as Bonze (Le rossignol and Madama Butterfly), Zuniga, Loredano (I due Foscari), the Magistrate (Werther) and Mr. Ratcliffe for the American stage première of Billy Budd (1970). In 1980, at Mexico's Bellas Artes, he triumphed in the title role of "Don Quichotte", repeating it in 1981 in Monterrey.

In 1976 Voketaitis portrayed Rev. John Hale in Robert Ward's The Crucible with the Florentine Opera. In 1989 he returned to Chicago as Abimelech in Camille Saint-Saëns's Samson et Dalila. The following year he sang Basilio in The Barber of Seville at the Miami Opera.

He has also performed in concert the solo bass role in the Shostakovich 13th Symphony with the Chicago Symphony Orchestra (1979), Minnesota (1980) and Dallas (1985) Symphonies, as well as the solo bass in Beethoven's 9th Symphony with the Pittsburgh Symphony. Other appearances include performing with the New York Philharmonic, the Philadelphia Orchestra, the Cleveland Orchestra, Detroit Symphony Orchestra and the San Francisco Symphony among many others, under such conductors as Maxim Shostakovich, Leonard Bernstein, JoAnn Falletta, Leonard Slatkin, James Levine, Leopold Stokowski, and André Previn. Leonard Bernstein has said of Voketaitis, "From every point of view - vocal musicianship, intelligence, personal qualities - he is certainly a musical asset." Voketaitis has performed with many of the word's foremost musicians, including Placido Domingo, Wynton Marsalis, and Rita Shane.

Voketaitis's career has been mostly within North America. Aside from his many Mexico appearances, he has made a few other international appearances, including performing at the Liceu in Spain, the Teatro Nacional de Costa Rica, and the Teresa Carreño Cultural Complex in Venezuela. He has also made several recordings for television and CD, six of which have garnered Grammy Award nominations. He was notably awarded the Man of the Year Award from the Balzekas Museum of Lithuanian Culture, the Distinguished Alumni Medal from his alma mater (Quinnipiac University), as well as a Rockefeller Award. In 2009 he was awarded the Commander's Cross of the Order of the Lithuanian Grand Duke Gediminas, Lithuania's high cultural medal, in honour of his artistic achievement and support of Lithuanian culture. In academia, he was Visiting Scholar/Artist-in-Residence for Opera and Voice at Auburn University in Alabama, Director of Opera at DePaul University in Chicago, artist faculty at Brevard Music Center, and guest lecturer at Northwestern University.

On September 12, 2015, Voketaitis was inducted into the National Lithuanian American Hall of Fame.
