= Thomas Jamerson =

American baritone

Thomas Jamerson was an American baritone who had an active international career as an opera and concert performer from the 1960s through the 1990s. He first drew distinction in the field of opera in 1968 when he recorded the role of the Marquis d'Obigny in Giuseppe Verdi's La traviata for RCA with conductor Georges Prêtre, the RCA Italiana Orchestra, and Montserrat Caballé as Violetta and Carlo Bergonzi as Alfredo. In 1968 he portrayed roles in the United States premieres of two operas at the Santa Fe Opera: Ein Ringender (A Struggling Soul) in Arnold Schoenberg's Die Jakobsleiter and Captain of the Royal Guard in Hans Werner Henze's The Bassarids. He was a principal artist with the New York City Opera from 1969 to 1984. In 1971 he notably created the role of Professor Bolental in the world premiere of Gian Carlo Menotti's The Most Important Man. He taught voice on the faculty at the Music Conservatory of Westchester in White Plains, New York until shortly before his death in September 2026.

== Life and career ==
Born on July 3, 1942 in New Orleans, Louisiana, Jamerson graduated in 1965 with a bachelor's degree in vocal performance from Louisiana State University where he studied with Loren Davidson. He went on to earn a Master of Music in vocal performance from LSU in 1971, and studied with Cornelius L. Reid in New York City. In 1965 he was a finalist in the Metropolitan Opera National Council Auditions, and he performed Giorgio's aria "Di Provenza il mar, il suol chi dal cor ti cancellò?" from Giuseppe Verdi's La traviata in concert at the Metropolitan Opera House on March 28, 1965. In 1966 he made his professional opera debut as Count Almaviva in Mozart's The Marriage of Figaro with the Metropolitan Opera National Company, performing the role in more than 70 cities throughout the United States.

In the late 1960s, Jamerson apprenticed with the Santa Fe Opera (SFO). He notably portrayed the role of Ein Ringender in the United States premiere of Arnold Schoenberg's Die Jakobsleiter and the role of the Captain of the Royal Guard in the United States premiere of Hans Werner Henze's The Bassarids with the SFO in 1968. He had first drawn distinction in the field of opera a year earlier when he recorded the role of the Marquis d'Obigny in Giuseppe Verdi's La traviata for RCA with conductor Georges Prêtre, the RCA Italiana Orchestra, and Montserrat Caballé as Violetta and Carlo Bergonzi as Alfredo in 1968.

Jamerson relocated to New York City, and made his New York opera debut with the New York City Opera in March 1969 as Silvio in Pagliacci. He sang with the American Opera Society in 1969 as Nevers in Giacomo Meyerbeer's Les Huguenots with Beverly Sills as Margaret of Valois at Carnegie Hall. In 1970 he performed the role of Gadshill in Gustav Holst's At the Boar's Head with The Little Orchestra Society and conductor Thomas Scherman at David Geffen Hall. That same year he returned to the NYCO as Monsieur de Brétigny in Jules Massenet's Manon in March 1970 at the David H. Koch Theater with Carol Neblett in the title role and Julius Rudel conducting. He continued to perform with the NYCO for 15 consecutive seasons, appearing in both leading and supporting roles like Sharpless in Giacomo Puccini's Madama Butterfly, Marcello in Puccini's La bohème, Valentin in Charles Gounod's Faust, and Harlequin in Richard Strauss's Ariadne auf Naxos among many others. In 1971 he created the role of Professor Bolental in the world premiere of Gian Carlo Menotti's The Most Important Man with the NYCO. He notably re-created one of the roles in his NYCO repertoire, Pish‐Tush in Gilbert and Sullivan's The Mikado, in the 1978 film Foul Play starring Goldie Hawn and Chevy Chase. In 1983 he represented the City Opera's soloist employees who were members of the American Guild of Musical Artists in highly publicized labor dispute meetings with the NYCO orchestra, the NYCO governing board, and the New York State Department of Labor. His final performance with the NYCO was as Schaunard in Puccini's La bohème in 1984.

In addition to performing with the NYCO, Jamerson also performed in operas with the Baltimore Opera Company, Canadian Opera Company, the Opera Company of Boston, the Opera Company of Philadelphia, and the Palacio de Bellas Artes. In his later career, he has dedicated most of his time to teaching voice on the faculty at the Music Conservatory of Westchester and working as a church musician at Grace Episcopal Church in White Plains, New York. At Grace Episcopal Church he performed the title role in Benjamin Britten's Noye's Fludde (1998) and the Bishop in the East Coast premiere of Stephen Paulus'a The Three Hermits (1999).

== Roles with New York City Opera ==
- Silvio in Ruggero Leoncavallo's Pagliacci (1969, 1972, 1977)
- Monsieur de Brétigny in Jules Massenet's Manon (1970, 1978, 1979 David H. Koch Theater, Carol Neblett in title role, Julius Rudel conducting)
- Unknown role in Dmitri Shostakovich's 1934 opera Lady Macbeth of the Mtsensk District (1970, NYCO)
- Dandini in Rossini's La Cenerentola (1970, 1983)
- Professor Bolental in Gian Carlo Menotti's The Most Important Man (1971)
- Schaunard in Puccini's La bohème (1971, 1972, 1983, 1984)
- Silvano in Giuseppe Verdi's Un ballo in maschera (1971)
- Faninal in Richard Strauss's Der Rosenkavalier (1973)
- Sharpless in Giacomo Puccini's Madama Butterfly (1973, 1975)
- Ottone in Claudio Monteverdi's L'incoronazione di Poppea (1973)
- The Secretary in Hans Werner Henze's Der junge Lord (1973)
- The Three Barge Men in Frederick Delius A Village Romeo and Juliet (1973)
- Marcello in Puccini's La bohème (1974, 1977, 1978, 1979)
- Pish‐Tush in Gilbert and Sullivan's The Mikado (1974)
- Valentin in Charles Gounod's Faust (1974)
- Harlequin in Richard Strauss's Ariadne auf Naxos (1974, 1975, 1977)
- Masetto in Wolfgang Amadeus Mozart's Don Giovanni (1974)
- Ping in Puccini's Turandot (1975, 1977)
- Morales in Georges Bizet's Carmen (1975, 1977, 1981)
- Dr. Falke in Johann Strauss II's Die Fledermaus (1976)
- Barney in Douglas Moore's The Ballad of Baby Doe (1976)
- Sonora in Puccini's La fanciulla del West (1977)
- Rouche in Umberto Giordano's Andrea Chénier (1979)
- Dr. Cajus in Otto Nicolai's The Merry Wives of Windsor (1981)
- Belcore in Gaetano Donizetti's L'elisir d'amore (1981, New York Grand Opera)
- Barone Douphol in Giuseppe Verdi's La traviata (1982)
- Marquis de Cascada in Franz Lehár's The Merry Widow (1982, 1983)
- Gravedigger in Ambroise Thomas's Hamlet (1982)

== Concert work ==
- Gustav Mahler's Symphony No. 2 at Carnegie Hall with conductor Arthur Winograd and the Hartford Symphony Orchestra (1971)
- Carl Philipp Emanuel Bach's Magnificat with the Danbury Symphony Orchestra (1997)
