= Francesca Roberto =

American operatic soprano

Francesca Roberto (born c. 1935, Connecticut) is an American operatic soprano. A winner of the Metropolitan Opera National Council Auditions, she sang leading roles throughout the United States during the 1960s and early 1970s.

== Life and career ==
Raised in Greenwich, Connecticut, Roberto studied voice at The Hartt School and in Italy. In 1954 she made her Broadway debut as a member of the chorus in the world premiere of Gian Carlo Menotti's The Saint of Bleecker Street. In 1961 she won the Metropolitan Opera National Council Auditions.

In 1962 Roberto sang with George Shirley on The Bell Telephone Hour and appeared as Violetta in La traviata with conductor Boris Goldovsky and the New England Opera Theater. In 1963 she portrayed the title role in Samuel Barber's Vanessa at the Washington National Opera with Beverly Wolff as Erika. In 1964 she sang the title role in Puccini's Tosca with the Brooklyn Opera.

In 1965/1966 Roberto toured the United States with the Metropolitan Opera National Company performing the roles of Cio-Cio-San in Giacomo Puccini's Madama Butterfly and Frasquita in Carmen. That same year she portrayed the title role in Giuseppe Verdi's Aida at the Toledo Opera. She made her debut, and only performance, at the Metropolitan Opera in 1966 as Cio-Cio-San with George Shirley as Pinkerton and George Schick conducting. That same year she made her debut at the Seattle Opera as Nedda in Pagliacci with Roald Reitan as Silvio and James McCracken as Canio. She was also the soloist with the Rhode Island Philharmonic in 1966.

In 1967 Roberto made her debut at the San Francisco Opera as Santuzza in Cavalleria rusticana. That same year she made her debut at the New York City Opera as Mimi in La bohème with Plácido Domingo as Rodolfo. She also portrayed Cio-Cio-San to Domingo's Pinkerton with the NYCO in 1967. She returned to the NYCO in the 1968-1969 season to portray Cio-Cio-San (with Domingo) and Santuzza, and once again in 1972 as Santuzza.
