= John Fiorito =

American opera singer (born 1936)

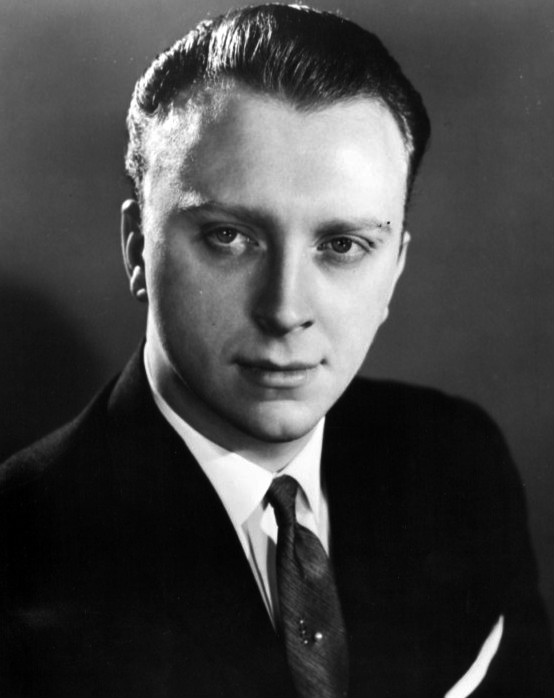
Fiorito in 1963.

John Fiorito (born 4 September 1936 in New York) is a baritone opera singer.

== Career ==
Fiorito began his classical training in 1952, with Rita Kittain and her associate, Lydia Chaliapin. He made his professional debut in 1957, with the Toledo Choral Society and Symphony in the title role of Mendelssohn's "Elijah".

Fiorito's operatic career began in 1961 with the New York City Opera. Later in 1965 he became a leading baritone in the Metropolitan Opera National Company, a touring company of the Met, under the direction of Risa Stevens. Fiorito has appeared with the Wiener Staatsoper and Volksoper, L'Opera de Montreal, Spoleto Festival Charleston, SC, Milwaukee Florentine Opera, the Washington Opera (DC), and many other regional companies in the United States. He made his Metropolitan Opera debut in 1990, in Donizetti's "L'elisir d'amore".

== Teaching ==
Fiorito has taught voice, for over twenty-five years, including several years on the voice faculty of George Washington University, now on the faculty of SCF, State College of Florida. He is a member of NATS. He no longer performs but is retired. After retiring from the stage after his fifteenth consecutive season at the Metropolitan Opera, he began to focus more on teaching. Some of his most noteworthy pupils include Stephan Gould and Joel Sorensen.

His students are now performing in Europe and the United States in regional companies throughout the US and Metropolitan Opera, and in all the major houses in Europe. Fiorito is known for his focus on vocal structure: vowel structure, as well as on interpretive details and the text. He teaches both in New York City as well as in Florida.
