= Andrij Dobriansky =

Ukrainian opera singer (1930–2012)

- Андрій Добрянський
- Born: September 2, 1930; Lviv, Ukraine
- Died: February 1, 2012 (aged 81); New York City, United States
- Education: Amherst College
- Occupation: Opera singer (bass-baritone)

Andrij Dobriansky (Ukrainian: Андрій Добрянський; September 2, 1930 – February 1, 2012) was a principal artist with the Metropolitan Opera for 30 years where he sang over 60 roles in over 900 performances. As a displaced person in post-war Germany, he earned a scholarship to study chemistry at Amherst College, but later decided to forgo chemistry and pursued a career in opera. The bass-baritone had the longest career with the Met of any Ukrainian-born artist.

== Early life ==
Andrij Dobriansky was born in 1930 on the outskirts of Lviv, during the interbellum period of rule by the Second Polish Republic. His father, Agaton Dobriansky, was a Ukrainian officer and veteran of both the Legion of Ukrainian Sich Riflemen and the Ukrainian People's Army, and his mother, Teodora (née Wynnytsky de Chechil), was a violinist at the Lviv Theatre of Opera and Ballet.

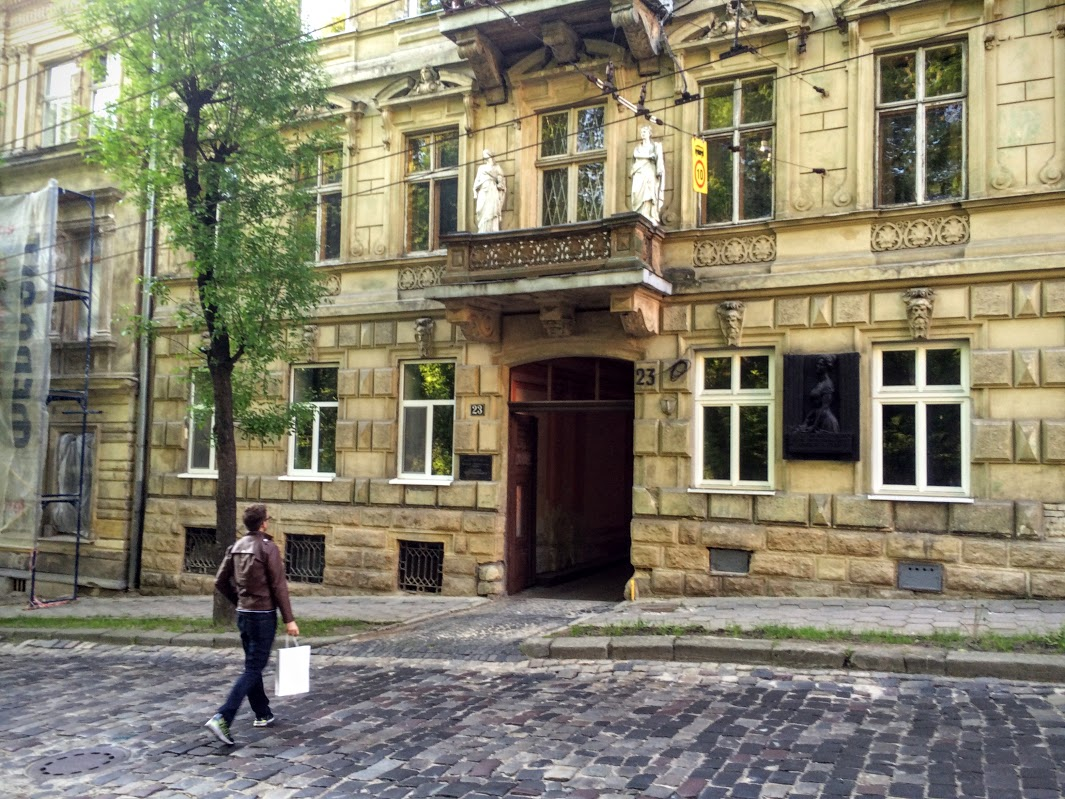
Solomiya Krushelnytska's home in Lviv

After his parents separated, his mother moved with him and his younger sister, Zvenislava, to live in the heart of the city in the same building where Solomiya Krushelnytska, a renowned soprano of the early 20th century, lived. The building was known as a haven for intellectuals and artists. In this environment, the young Dobriansky was exposed several opera singers such as the tenor Vasyl Tysiak, baritone Lev Reinarovych, and bass Ivan Rubchak.

Trapped in Lvov after the Nazi and Soviet invasions of Poland, Andrij, Zvenislava, and their mother managed to stay together until 1944, when 13-year-old Andrij was "rounded up" (Polish: Łapanka) and sent by train to work as a labor camp conscript in Germany. He finished his secondary education in a displaced persons camp near Heidenau. After the passage of the Displaced Persons Act, he received a scholarship to Amherst College and arrived in America under the name 'Andreas Dobrianskyj' in October 1950 aboard the USS General S. D. Sturgis (6).

== Career ==
Dobriansky made his professional singing debut with the Philadelphia Lyric Opera Company on November 10, 1964. He performed the role of Jake Wallace, a traveling camp minstrel, in Puccini's La fanciulla del West. The following year, he was selected from among 1,300 singers to sing with the Metropolitan Opera National Company. For several years he toured more than a dozen cities throughout the United States annually, some for engagements of only one night, alongside other up-and-coming singers. Dobriansky made his Metropolitan Opera Company debut in on 11 February 1970 once again in Puccini's La fanciulla del West, this time in the role of the miner Happy. His repertoire of comprimario roles led to his becoming a staple in the Met roster. His long career at the Met included the Met premieres of Les mamelles de Tirésias (1981), Verdi's I vespri siciliani (1974), the world premiere of The Ghosts of Versailles (1991), as well as in new Met stagings of Khovanshchina (1985), Arabella (1983), Prodaná nevěsta (1978), Gianni Schicchi (1974), La fille du régiment (1972), Werther (1971), and Der Freischütz (1971). He can be heard on many archived Metropolitan Opera broadcasts and telecasts, including the company's first pay-per-view broadcast of its gala performance celebrating the 25th Anniversary of the Metropolitan Opera House at Lincoln Center.

Dobriansky was also an art song recitalist and oratorio soloist. He performed with many symphony orchestras and opera companies, including the Seattle Opera, the Boston Opera, the Newport Music Festival, the Berkshire Opera, and the Chautauqua Music Festival. His final operatic performance was on January 6, 1996, performing the role of Ivan in Strauss' Die Fledermaus.

A proponent of Ukrainian music in the United States, he frequently performed and conducted works by Ukrainian composers. In 1968, he recorded an album of songs composed by the popular Ukrainian musician Bohdan Vesolovsky, entitled Andrij Dobriansky with songs by J. B. Vesolovsky. For decades, he performed as a soloist with the New York-based Dumka chorus and served as artistic director and consultant to many Ukrainian musical productions, including the Ukrainian Composers Series at the Town Hall and the Ukrainian Institute of America, From 1980 until his death, Dobriansky was a liturgical cantor as well as the conductor of the Andrey Sheptytsky choir at Saint George Ukrainian Catholic Church in New York's Little Ukraine.

A portrait of the artist can be found at the Metropolitan Opera Gallery at the Lincoln Center for the Performing Arts. His legacy of Ukrainian liturgical singing and community involvement was documented briefly by his children on the PBS series Bare Feet in NYC.

== Videography ==
- The Metropolitan Opera Gala 1991, Deutsche Grammophon DVD, 00440-073-4582
