= Susannah =

Opera by Carlisle Floyd

- Opera by Carlisle Floyd
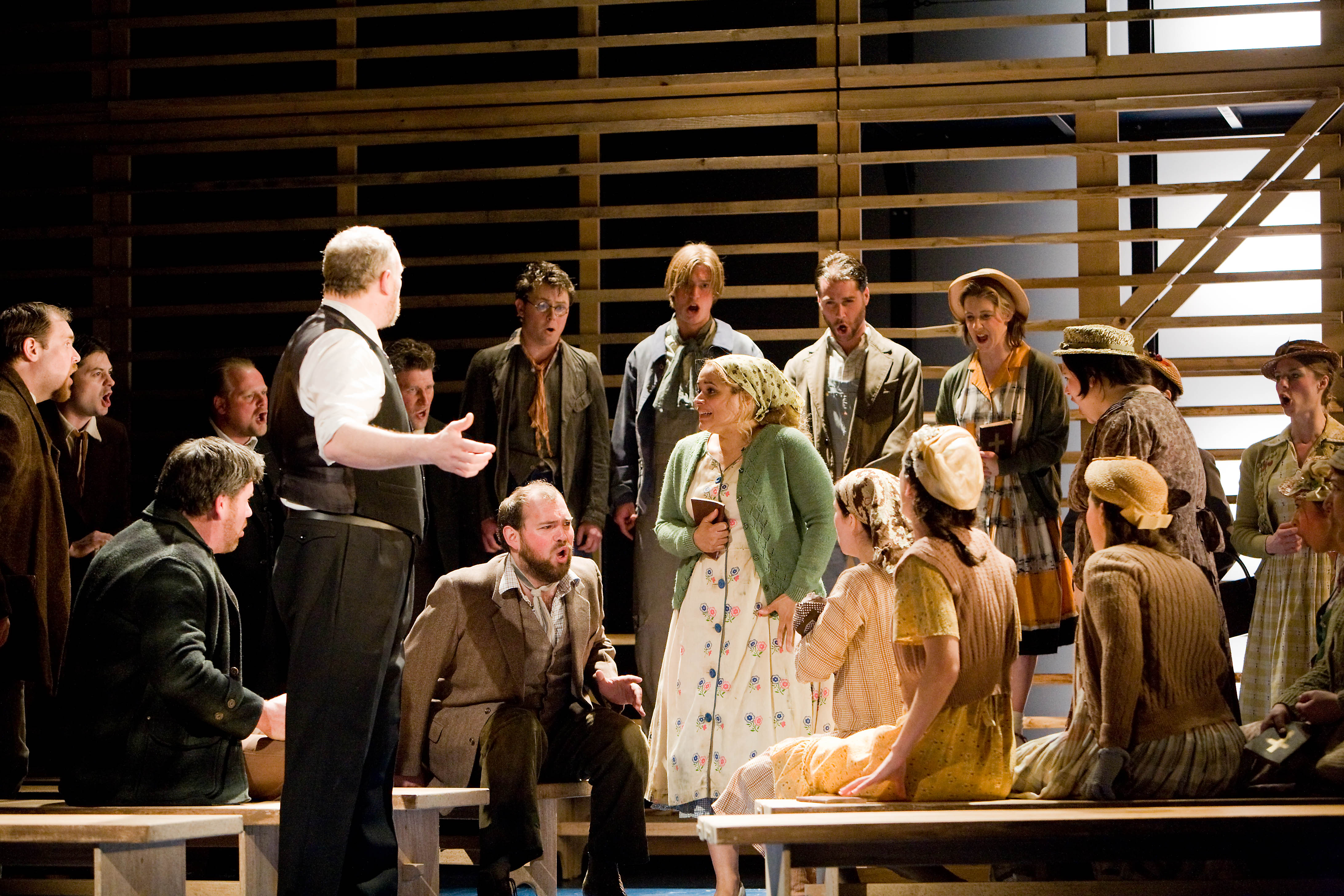
- Church scene in a performance of the English Touring Opera in 2008, with Andrew Slater as Blitch and Donna Bateman in the title role
- Librettist: Floyd
- Language: English
- Based on: Susannah and the Elders
- Premiere: February 24, 1955; Florida State University

Susannah is an opera in two acts by the American composer Carlisle Floyd, who wrote the libretto and music while a member of the piano faculty at Florida State University. Floyd adapted the story from the Apocryphal tale of Susannah and the Elders, though the story as adapted in the opera has a more positive ending. The story focuses on 18-year-old Susannah Polk, an innocent girl who is targeted as a sinner in the small mountain town of New Hope Valley, in the Southern American state of Tennessee.

The opera was awarded the New York Music Critics Circle Award for Best New Opera in 1956 and was chosen to represent American music and culture at the World's Fair at Brussels in 1958, with a production (by Frank Corsaro) that featured Phyllis Curtin and Norman Treigle. It received its Metropolitan Opera premiere in 1999, with Renée Fleming singing the title role, Jerry Hadley singing Sam and Samuel Ramey singing Blitch. Ramey also recorded the complete opera with Cheryl Studer as Susannah and Jerry Hadley as Sam. Other well-known sopranos who have portrayed the heroine have included Lee Venora, Joy Clements, Faith Esham, Maralin Niska, Nancy Shade, Diana Soviero, Karan Armstrong, Kelly Kaduce and Phyllis Treigle (opposite Michael Devlin as Blitch).

Susannah is one of the most performed American operas, second to Porgy and Bess, and celebrated its 50th anniversary with a performance on the very stage where it premiered February 24, 1955, in Ruby Diamond Auditorium at Florida State University. At the first performance, Carlisle Floyd was awarded an Honorary Doctorate of Humane Letters from Florida State.

It has been speculated that the opera was inspired by McCarthyism, and threat of institutional Hollywood communist invasion of America during the early 1950s. The opera also contains many feminist themes that had not been widely explored in popular culture at the time of the opera's writing. Floyd said this opera was meant to be different from a traditional opera.

The music is largely characterized by Appalachian folk melodies. Also included are some Protestant hymns and some traditional classical music. A particularly prominent part of the opera is Susannah's soaring and melancholy aria in Act II, "The Trees on the Mountain", which is similar to Appalachian folk tunes but in fact Floyd's own composition. In 2019, Rhiannon Giddens released a vernacular version of "Trees on the Mountains" on her album, There Is No Other.

== Synopsis ==
Written during the McCarthy era, Susannah is based loosely on the Apocryphal tale of Susannah and the Elders. In New Hope Valley, Tennessee, Susannah – a pretty and well-mannered young woman of humble origins – is faced with hostility from her church community. The opera opens at a square dance given by her church; a group of wives, jealous of Susannah's beauty and the attention it brings from their husbands, are gossiping about her. Reverend Olin Blitch, newly arrived to lead the congregation, enters and asks Susannah to dance despite the gossip. Later that evening, Susannah tells her friend Little Bat – son of Mrs. McLean and her husband, an elder of the church – about the dance; Little Bat leaves abruptly once her brother Sam returns from hunting.

The next morning Susannah is innocently bathing naked in the creek near her home; she is discovered by the elders, who are searching for a baptismal stream. They conceal their lust with outrage and tell the community of her wickedness. Susannah arrives at a church dinner that evening and is sent away, much to her confusion. Later, as she is pondering why she has been shunned, Little Bat tells her that the elders have denounced her for bathing in the nude, and admits that he was coerced into saying she seduced him.

Her brother Sam advises Susannah to make a public confession in order to be absolved, though he knows she has done nothing wrong. Though she claims she has nothing to confess, she goes to the service where Olin Blitch is preaching. When she is singled out to come forward, she runs away. Once the service has ended, Reverend Blitch goes to Susannah's cabin and offers to pray for her soul. Upon discovering that her brother is away, Blitch seduces her.

The next day Blitch, having discovered that Susannah was a virgin, comes to her and begs for forgiveness. He throws himself on Susannah's mercy, but she refuses to forgive him. Blitch tells the church elders that God revealed to him in a vision that Susannah has been judged unjustly, but they don’t believe him. When Sam returns home and hears what happened, he threatens to kill Blitch and leaves for the baptismal service carrying his shotgun. He shoots Blitch (offstage). Convinced that Susannah led her brother to murder, the community heads to her cabin to drive her out of the valley. However, Little Bat has warned her in advance, and when the vigilantes arrive she is waiting with a shotgun. They retreat, but Little Bat stays, hoping to seduce Susannah. She pretends to lure him toward her, then slaps him. He runs off, howling, and the opera ends with Susannah’s lonely figure standing on her front porch, knowing she has effectively severed her ties with the community and her world.

== Main roles and world-premiere cast ==
- Susannah Polk – soprano (Phyllis Curtin)
- Sam Polk – tenor (Walter James)
- Olin Blitch – bass-baritone (Mack Harrell)
- Little Bat McLean – tenor (Eb Thomas)
- Elder McLean – baritone (Harrison Fisher)
- Elder Gleaton – tenor (Kenneth Nelson)
- Elder Hayes – tenor (Dayton Smith)
- Elder Ott – baritone (Lee Liming)
- Mrs. McLean – mezzo-soprano (Martha Kay Willis)
- Mrs. Gleaton – soprano (Catherine Murphy)
- Mrs. Hayes – soprano (Joan Nichy)
- Mrs. Ott – contralto (Bette Jo Armstrong)

== Production history ==
The German premiere was in 1959 at the Theater Oberhausen. In 1965 and 1966, the Metropolitan Opera National Company performed the opera in 72 cities throughout North America during a nine month tour. This production was directed by José Quintero, used sets designed by Beni Montresor, and starred Maralin Niska in the title role.

Rossini's The Kammeroper in Vienna produced the opera in 1996 with Canadian Desmond Byrne as Blitch. Deutsche Oper Berlin premiered their production in 1997 with Dean Petersen in that role.

The first performances in the U.K. were given by Kentish Opera in Orpington in July 1961, and were reviewed in The Times. The opera was performed by John Lewis Opera in 1968, and these performances were incorrectly stated in the 1979 edition of the Concise Oxford Dictionary of Opera to be the first stage performances in England

In 1996, the opera was performed as a community project directed by John La Bouchardiere at mac (Birmingham) in 1996. In November 2001 AAC presents Opera for All put on four performances of Susannah at the Sir Richard Eyre Theatre in Willesden, London NW10. The first fully professional production in the UK was by English Touring Opera in 2008.

The opera had its New York Metropolitan Opera premiere in 1999 with Renée Fleming in the title role, and Samuel Ramey.

The Theater Hagen mounted a production in the spring of 2012. In 2010, with a cast including Latonia Moore as Susannah and James Morris as Blitch, the Opera of Bilbao, Spain produced Susannah conducted by John Mauceri with the Robert Falls production premiered in Chicago but also produced at the Metropolitan Opera New York.

St. Petersburg Opera Company staged a production in 2014 at the Palladium Theater. The cast included Susan Hellman Spatafora as Susannah and Todd Donovan as Olin Blitch, with Michael Unger as Stage Director and Mark Sforzini as Conductor. A DVD of the production was created on the Naxos label, which was awarded The Best of 2017 - Recordings/Video by Opera News.

== Discography ==
- Studer, Hadley, Ramey; Nagano, 1993–94 (Virgin Classics) – Grammy Award for Best Opera Recording of 1995
- Niska, Treigle, Bittner, Leuders, Theyard, Hall, Yule, Lankston, Fitch, 1971 [live] (Private Recording)
- Curtin, Cassilly, Treigle; Andersson, 1962 [live] (VAI)

== Videography ==
- Treigle; Yestadt, Treigle, 1958 [live] (Bel Canto Society) [Revival Scene]
- Hellman Spatafora, Wright Webb, Donovan; Sforzini, Unger, (St. Pete Opera) 2014 [live] (Naxos)
