= Enrico Di Giuseppe =

American tenor (1932–2005)

Di Giuseppe as Riccardo in Giuseppe Verdi's Un ballo in maschera

Enrico Di Giuseppe (October 14, 1932 – December 31, 2005) was a celebrated American operatic tenor who had an active performance career from the late 1950s through the 1990s. He spent most of his career performing in New York City, juggling concurrent performance contracts with both the New York City Opera and the Metropolitan Opera during the 1970s and 1980s. In the latter part of his career, he was active with the New York Grand Opera.

Possessing a lyric tenor voice with a bright timbre and easy upper extension, Di Giuseppe excelled in the Italian repertory. He was particularly successful in tackling the bel canto repertoire, notably partnering Beverly Sills in productions of Donizetti's Anna Bolena, Maria Stuarda, and Roberto Devereux, as well as Bellini's I puritani at the NYCO. Di Giuseppe performed in similar repertoire at the Met opposite other notable bel canto interpreters like Dame Joan Sutherland, Marilyn Horne and Renata Scotto.

== Early life and education ==
Di Giuseppe was born in Philadelphia in 1932. His first musical experience was with the clarinet, which he played in school. As a youth, he enjoyed singing with others on street corners and one day a local man heard him singing and asked if he would sing a song at his wedding. Enrico agreed to this. The day of the wedding, Enrico showed up and found the groom. He was escorted on stage to sing with the band. He had prepared the traditional wedding song "Because", but he had never sung it with accompaniment before. When he came in after the intro, he knew that something was terribly wrong; he later realized he had started an octave higher than where it was written. After the first couple lines, he stopped singing and walked off the stage. The groom met him before he could leave the wedding and told him to just relax and try it again. He agreed to give it another try and the second attempt went perfectly and that was the first time he realized he was destined to be a singer.

Di Giuseppe attended the prestigious Curtis Institute of Music in Philadelphia, where he studied with Richard Bonelli. After service with the United States Army field band, he went on to study at The Juilliard School in New York City under Hans Heinz.

== Career ==
He made his formal debut in the summer of 1959, as the Chevalier des Grieux in Jules Massenet's Manon, with The Experimental Opera Theatre of America (affiliated with the New Orleans Opera Association), conducted by Renato Cellini and directed by Armando Agnini. In 1960 he made his debut with the Philadelphia Grand Opera Company as Rodolfo in Giacomo Puccini's La bohème. He sang with the PGOC several more times during the 1960s and 1970s, including portraying Pinkerton in Madama Butterfly (1963), Count Almaviva in Il barbiere di Siviglia (1963, 1975), Cassio in Otello (1964), Alfredo in La traviata (1970), and the title role in Faust (1974).

In 1962 Di Giuseppe made his debut with the San Francisco Opera as Mario Cavaradossi in Puccini's Tosca in the title role and Chester Ludgin as Scarpia. He returned to that house two years later to sing Rodolfo to Lee Venora's Mimì. Among Di Giuseppe's other early professional opportunities were stints touring with Boris Goldovsky's New England Opera Theater and with the fledgling, and short-lived, Metropolitan Opera National Company (MONC). di Giuseppe worked for the MONC on a 1965 production of Rossini's La Cenerentola, with his wife, soprano Lorna Ceniceros. Lorna was playing the role of Clorinda in the production and Enrico was portraying Ramiro.

=== New York City Opera and Metropolitan Opera ===
Di Giuseppe is one of the few opera singers to have had lengthy overlapping careers at both the New York City Opera (NYCO) and at the Metropolitan Opera. He made his NYCO debut in 1965 as Michele in The Saint of Bleecker Street. He returned in 1967 for what was possibly his greatest success, the difficult, "tenor-altino" role of the Astrologue in Rimsky-Korsakov's The Golden Cockerel, opposite Norman Treigle and Beverly Sills, conducted by Julius Rudel and directed by Tito Capobianco. He would go on to perform twenty-six roles at City Opera over sixteen years, in operas such as The Barber of Seville, The Magic Flute, Der Rosenkavalier, Cavalleria rusticana, Tosca, Manon, Gianni Schicchi, Madama Butterfly, Faust, Capriccio, La traviata, La bohème, La Cenerentola, Lucia di Lammermoor, Rigoletto, Un ballo in maschera, Roberto Devereux, Don Giovanni (directed by Frank Corsaro), Maria Stuarda, Anna Bolena, I puritani, La fille du régiment, Attila, The Makropulos Case, and Mefistofele.

Di Giuseppe's Metropolitan Opera debut took place less than five years after his NYCO debut, in a 1969 concert in Central Park as Alfredo. His first appearance on the actual stage of the Metropolitan Opera House was on January 1, 1970, opposite Martina Arroyo in Madama Butterfly. He was seen there, until 1986, in Cavalleria rusticana, The Barber of Seville, Werther (replacing Franco Corelli), Rigoletto, La fille du régiment (opposite Sutherland), La bohème, La traviata, Un ballo in maschera, La sonnambula, Faust, L'elisir d'amore, L'italiana in Algeri (with Horne), Der Rosenkavalier, Don Pasquale, Così fan tutte, Le siège de Corinthe, Adriana Lecouvreur (opposite Scotto), Samson (opera) (as The Philistine Man, with Jon Vickers in the name part), and Rigoletto.

Di Giuseppe made his final Met appearance in 1986. In the following years, he regularly performed with the New York Grand Opera.

=== Freelance artist ===
While working primarily in New York City, Di Giuseppe did occasionally appear as a guest artist with other opera companies. He mostly was active in the United States, singing with such companies as Baltimore Opera, the Opera Company of Boston, Cincinnati Opera, Dallas Opera, the Houston Grand Opera, and the Pittsburgh Opera among others. In 1973 he made his only appearance with the Philadelphia Lyric Opera Company as Tonio in La fille du régiment opposite Sills as Marie.

He appeared in the Opera Philadelphia's very first season in January 1976 as Pinkerton to the Cio-cio-san of Atsuko Azuma. He returned to the OCP once more in 1980 to portray Nadir in Georges Bizet's Les pêcheurs de perles. Outside of the US, Di Giuseppe made appearances with the Ottawa Opera, the Canadian Opera Company, Vancouver Opera, and the Palacio de Bellas Artes in Mexico City. He also performed the role of Don José in Ireland in 1984 and made several appearances in operas in Asia from 1983 to 1985.

== Later life ==
Following his retirement, Di Giuseppe taught at Florida State University and The Juilliard School. A resident of Deptford Township, New Jersey, the tenor died of cancer in Voorhees Township, on December 31, 2005. His wife Lorna Ceniceros survived him, along with a son and a brother.

== Recordings ==
He can be heard as Pollione in Bellini's Norma (1973), on ABC Records, with Sills, Shirley Verrett, Paul Plishka, and James Levine conducting his first operatic recording. In 2009, Deutsche Grammophon published it on compact disc.
