= New England Opera Theater =

Former American opera company

The New England Opera Theatre (later known as the Goldovsky Opera Theater) was an American opera company that was active from 1945 to 1985. Founded by Boris Goldovsky in January 1945, the company was originally based in Boston, Massachusetts. It was initially established under the sponsorship of the New England Conservatory as a training ground for young opera singers. The company became independent and moved to New York in the 1950s and enjoyed four decades of touring during which young singers were trained for operatic careers. Many of them went on to sing at the Metropolitan Opera and other leading houses. The company disbanded upon Goldovsky's retirement in 1985.
