= Paul Plishka =

American operatic bass (1941–2025)

- Plishka in the 1990s
- Born: August 28, 1941; Old Forge, Pennsylvania, U.S.
- Died: February 3, 2025 (aged 83); Wilmington, North Carolina, U.S.
- Occupation: Operatic bass
- Organizations: Metropolitan Opera; La Scala
- Spouses: Judith Colgan (died 2004): Sharon Thomas
- Children: 3

Paul Plishka (August 28, 1941 – February 3, 2025) was an American operatic bass based at the Metropolitan Opera (Met) in New York City where he appeared first in 1967 and last in 2018, in 88 roles and 1672 performances. He also sang at leading houses internationally, a regular guest at La Scala in Milan and touring with the ensemble to Tokyo and Moscow. His voice was described as dark, rich, powerful and expressive. After years of small roles he performed leading roles, developing in Verdi's Don Carlos from a Monk to the Grand Inquisitor at the 1998 Salzburg Festival and Philip II of Spain. He chose the title role of Verdi's Falstaff for his 25th anniversary at the Met.

== Life and career ==
Plishka was born in Old Forge, Pennsylvania, on August 28, 1941. His grandparents had immigrated there from Ukraine and had worked in coal mines and factories. His father, Peter Plishka, worked as a stockroom employee, and his mother, Helen, was a seamstress in a factory. He grew up with a younger brother, Peter. The family moved to Paterson, New Jersey when he was age 16. He attended Eastside High School, where a teacher who saw him perform as Jud Fry in the musical Oklahoma! pointed him at opera. Plishka studied voice at Montclair State College and with Armen Boyajian and made his operatic debut with Boyajian's Paterson Lyric Opera, a touring company, in 1961. Boyajian would coach him throughout his career. From 1965 to 1967, Plishka toured the U.S. with the Metropolitan Opera National Company. When that company folded, he was offered a membership of the Metropolitan Opera (Met).

=== Metropolitan Opera ===
Plishka made his formal debut with the Met as the Monk in Ponchielli's La Gioconda in 1967, alongside Renata Tebaldi, Rosalind Elias and Sherrill Milnes. He remembered in a 2012 interview: “These were idols. They were all gods for me." Over his first three years, he performed around 30 smaller and mostly buffo roles, including Bartolo in Mozart's Le nozze di Figaro and Fra Melitone in Verdi's La forza del destino, but from the 1970s was assigned more dramatic roles such as Raimondo in Donizetti's Lucia di Lammermoor and Mephistopheles in Gounod's Faust in 1976, reviewed by Donal Henahan for The New York Times: "Mr. Plishka’s Mephistopheles was a harsher, more plainly malevolent character than is usually seen, and provided a few chills with his realistic outbursts of frustrated rage." He became one of the company's leading basses, but remained open to secondary roles.

His 88 roles at the house also included both the King and Ramfis in Verdi's Aida, both a monk and Philip II of Spain in Verdi's Don Carlos, both Wurm and Count Walter in Verdi's Luisa Miller, both Commendatore and Leporello in Mozart's Don Giovanni, both the Minister and Rocco in Beethoven's Fidelio, both Abimelech and an Old Hebrew in Saint-Saëns's Samson et Dalila, both Basilio and Bartolo in Rossini's Il barbiere di Siviglia, Raimondo in Donizetti's Lucia di Lammermoor, Oroveso in Bellini's Norma, Titurel in Wagner's Parsifal, Ferrando in Verdi's Il trovatore, Frère Laurent in Gounod's Roméo et Juliette, Marke in Wagner's Tristan und Isolde, Procida in Verdi's I vespri Siciliani, Timur in Puccini's Turandot, both Pimen and Varlaam in Mussorgsky's Boris Godunov, Sarastro in Mozart's Die Zauberflöte, Gremin in Tchaikovsky's Eugene Onegin, Daland in Der fliegende Holländer, Alvise in Ponchielli's La Gioconda, Banquo in Verdi's Macbeth, Narbal in Les Troyens by Berlioz, Silva in Verdi's Ernani, Fiesco in Verdi's Simon Boccanegra, Dosifej in Mussorgsky's Khovanshchina, Dulcamara in Donizetti's L'elisir d'amore, Giorgio in Bellini's I puritani, Jorg in Verdi's Stiffelio, the Waterman in Dvořák's Rusalka, Pagano in Verdi's I Lombardi, Sparafucile in Verdi's Rigoletto, Padre Guardiano in La forza del destino, Kezal in Smetana's The Bartered Bride, Dansker in Britten's Billy Budd, the Count des Grieux in Massenet's Manon and Nick Shadow in Stravinsky's The Rake's Progress. He portrayed Colline in Puccini's La bohème in the first public telecast in 1977. He chose the title role of Verdi's Falstaff for his 25th anniversary at the Met in 1992. Edward Rothstein wrote for The New York Times: "Mr. Plishka gave the role an almost touchingly human quality…He was a Falstaff almost enticingly full of himself."

Plishka retired from the Met in 2012, when his voice was still strong in all registers, but hearing became a problem. In his final performance he played the Sacristan in Puccini's Tosca on the Saturday broadcast on January 28, 2012. At the time, he had performed at the Met 45 years in 1,642 performances. There was a special tribute after Act I on stage, and on the air during intermission. In 2016 he was invited back to the Met for performances as Benoît and Alcindoro in Puccini's La bohème, and for more performances of these roles in the 2016/17 season and again in 2018. With a total of 1672 performances, he was number nine on the Met's official list of frequent performers.

=== La Scala ===
Plishka performed first at La Scala in Milan in 1975 as Brander in La damnation de Faust, with Nicolai Gedda. He sang the bass solo in Beethoven's Ninth Symphony there in 1976. He appeared in as Pimen in Boris Godunov, conducted by Claudio Abbado in 1981, as Enrico VIII in Anna Bolena in a revival of the Luchino Visconti production in 1982. He performed as Pagano in Verdi's I Lombardi in 1986, Zaccaria in Nabucco conducted by Riccardo Muti in 1988, as Timur in Puccini's Turandot with Ghena Dimitrova in 1988 and 1989, and in the same season as Capellio in Bellini's I Capuleti e i Montecchi. With the ensemble, he toured to Tokyo, Moscow and Barcelona. In concert, he sang a Lieder recital in 1988 and the bass solo in Verdi's Requiem several times between 1981 and 1992.

=== Europe ===
Plishka performed in Europe first in 1975, as Philip in Don Carlos at the Opéra national du Rhin in Strasbourg. He sang in Beethoven's Ninth Symphony at the Maggio Musicale Fiorentino in 1976. He appeared at the Opera de Paris as Padre Guardiano in 1976 and Fasolt in Das Rheingold in 1978. He performed as a guest at the Liceu in Barcelona in 1986, and as Phanuël in Massenet's Hérodiade at the Hamburg State Opera and the Orange Festival. He appeared at the Grand Théâtre de Genève as Pope Clement VII in Benvenuto Cellini by Berlioz in 1992 and as Count Walter in 1993. He performed at the 1998 Salzburg Festival as the Grand Inquisitor in Don Carlos, and at the Opéra de Marseille as Silva in 1999.

=== San Francisco ===
Plishka appeared at the San Francisco Opera as Padre Guardiano in 1976, in 1982 as Zaccaria, in 1984 as Silva, in 1986 as Mephistopheles, in 1987 as Rocco, in 1991 both as Capellio and General Kutusov in Prokofiev's War and Peace, and in 2003 as Bartolo in Rossini's Barbiere.

=== Others ===
Plishka performed at the New York City Opera in Bellini's I puritani in 1981. He appeared as Podestà in Rossini's La gazza ladra at the Opera Philadelphia in 1990, as Philip II at the Seattle Opera in 1993. He portrayed the title role of Donizetti's Don Pasquale at the Santiago Opera in Chile. He sang Cardinal de Brogni in a concert performance of Halévy's La Juive at Carnegie Hall, conducted by Eve Queler in 1999, and performed as Daland at the Baltimore Opera the same year, and as Dulcamara at the Lyric Opera of Chicago in 2000.

Plishka was a National Patron of Delta Omicron, an international professional music fraternity.

=== Voice ===
Plishka's voice was described as dark, rich, mellifluous, powerful and expressive. He is remembered for "sonorous, liquid bass tones and near-perfect diction", as Jonathan Kandell wrote in The New York Times. He was a fine actor, with a dignified and intense stage-presence.

=== Awards ===
Plishka was inducted into the Hall of Fame for Great American Opera Singers in a celebration at the Academy of Vocal Arts in Philadelphia. He received the Pennsylvania Governor's Award for Excellence in the Arts in 1992.

=== Personal life ===
Plishka met Judith Ann Colgan at Montclair State College; they married and had three sons, Paul Jr., Jeffrey, and Nicolai. In 1984, his younger brother, Dr. Peter Plishka of children's services at the state-run Children's Psychiatric Center, was found dead in his Bronx apartment with a self-inflicted stab wound. His wife died in 2004. In 2009, Jeffrey was charged with the 1991 killing of a 24-year-old camp counselor. He was acquitted the following year. Jeffrey died in 2017. Paul and Nicolai also predeceased their father. Plishka's second wife was Sharon Thomas, a former resident stage director at the Met. After his retirement, they moved to Wilmington, North Carolina, where he pursued interests such as bonsai and birdwatching.

Plishka died at a hospice in Wilmington on February 3, 2025, at the age of 83.

== Recordings ==
- Puccini: Tosca [as the Sacristan] (L. Price, Domingo, Milnes; Mehta, 1972)
- Donizetti: Anna Bolena (Sills, Verrett, Burrows; Rudel, 1972)
- Bellini: I puritani (Sills, Gedda, L. Quilico; Rudel, 1973)
- Bellini: Norma (Sills, Verrett, di Giuseppe; Levine, 1973)
- Gounod: Faust (Caballé, Aragall; Lombard, 1976)
- Massenet: Le Cid (Bumbry, Domingo; Queler, 1976) [live]
- Puccini: Turandot (Caballé, Freni, Carreras; Lombard, 1977)
- Verdi: Otello (Scotto, Domingo, Milnes; Levine, 1978)
- Puccini: La bohème (Scotto, Neblett, Kraus, Milnes; Levine, 1979)
- Verdi: Requiem (Caballé, Berini, Domingo; Mehta, 1980) [live]
- Verdi: La forza del destino (Freni, Domingo, Zancanaro; Muti, 1986)
- Verdi: Luisa Miller (Millo, Quivar, Domingo; Levine, 1991)
- Songs of Ukraine (Hrynkiv, 1992)
- Stravinsky: The Rake's Progress (McNair, Bostridge; Ozawa, 1995)

=== Video ===
Plishka performed especially in live broadcasts from the Met.

- Puccini: La bohème (Scotto, Niska, Pavarotti, Wixell; Levine, Melano, 1977) [live]
- Weill: Aufstieg und Fall der Stadt Mahagonny (Stratas, Varnay, Cassilly, MacNeil; Levine, Dexter, 1979) [live]
- Verdi: Don Carlos (Scotto, Troyanos, Moldoveanu, Milnes, Hines; Levine, Dexter, 1980) [live]
- Rossini: La cenerentola (von Stade, Araiza; Abbado, Ponnelle, 1981)
- Donizetti: Lucia di Lammermoor (Sutherland, Kraus, Elvíra; Bonynge, Donnell, 1982) [live]
- Berlioz: Les Troyens (Norman, Troyanos, Domingo; Levine, Melano, 1983) [live]
- Verdi: Simon Boccanegra (Tomowa-Sintow, Milnes; Levine, Capobianco, 1984) [live]
- Puccini: Turandot (Marton, Domingo; Levine, Zeffirelli, 1987) [live]
- Verdi: Luisa Miller (J. Anderson; Arena, Lassalle, 1988) [live]
- Verdi: Requiem (Sweet, Zajick, Pavarotti; Maazel, 1990) [live]
- The Metropolitan Opera Gala 1991 (Levine, 1991) [live]
- Verdi: Falstaff (Freni, Horne; Levine, Zeffirelli/Mills, 1992) [live]
- Verdi: Stiffelio (Sweet, Domingo; Levine, del Monaco, 1993) [live]
- James Levine's 25th Anniversary Metropolitan Opera Gala (1996) [live]
