= Marilyn Zschau =

American operatic soprano

Marilyn Zschau (born February. 9, 1944) is an American operatic soprano.

Born in Chicago, Zschau attended Juilliard School of Music in New York from 1961 to 1965. She first appeared in the role of Marietta in Die tote Stadt at the Vienna Volksoper in 1967. In 1971 she appeared in the role of the Composer in Ariadne auf Naxos at the Vienna State Opera. She debuted in the role of Minnie at the New York City Opera in La fanciulla del West in 1978. At the same venue she later appeared as Odabella in Verdi's Attila, and as Maddalena in Andrea Chénier. She made her Metropolitan Opera debut as Musetta in La bohème on February 4, 1985. At La Scala in Milan she appeared as the Dyer's Wife in Die Frau ohne Schatten in 1986. After that she appeared in many major opera houses worldwide.

In 1993 she performed Richard Strauss's Elektra at the BBC Proms with the BBC Symphony Orchestra conducted by Andrew Davis. In 1995 she appeared at the Seattle Opera as Brünnhilde in Richard Wagner's Ring cycle. In 1996 she again performed as Elektra in Buenos Aires. Throughout her career she performed many prominent roles such as Aida, Tosca, Desdemona, Salome, Marschallin.
