= Florence Quivar =

American operatic mezzo-soprano (born 1944)

Florence Quivar (born March 3, 1944) is an American operatic mezzo-soprano who is considered to be "one of the most prominent mezzos of her generation." She has variously been described as having a "rich, earthy sound and communicative presence" as "always reliable" and as "a distinguished singer, with a warm, rich voice and a dignified performing presence." From 1977 to 1997 she was a regular performer at the Metropolitan Opera where she gave more than 100 performances. She retired from performance in the mid 2000s. Since 2014 she is a member of voice faculty at the Academy of Vocal Arts in Philadelphia.

== Early life and education ==
Florence Elizabeth Quivar was born in Philadelphia, Pennsylvania on March 3, 1944. Her earliest music lessons were from her mother, Ruth, who was a pianist and organist. Her mother worked as the organist at 19th Street Baptist Church in Philadelphia and founded a gospel choir called the Harmonic Choraliers. She operated a private music studio teaching both piano and voice out of the Quivar family's home. The exposure to this music environment instilled in Quivar a strong passion for music from a very early age, and she performed her first solos in her family's church at the age of six. She was a student in the School District of Philadelphia and graduated from John Bartram High School in 1962. At the age of sixteen she performed as a soloist in a concert given at the annual national conference of the National Baptist Convention, USA held at Philadelphia Convention Hall and Civic Center in 1960.

While a teenager, Quivar became interested in opera after attending a performance of Madama Butterfly performed by the Metropolitan Opera ("Met") on that company's spring tour to Philadelphia. She studied singing in her youth at the Settlement Music School where she was a pupil of Tilly Barmach. Despite this interest, she originally planned on becoming an educator rather than a performer and initially studied briefly at a teacher's college after completing high school. She quickly transferred to the Philadelphia Academy of Music (PAM) where she was a voice student of teachers Marion Bradley Harvey and Margaret Kaiser. She gave her senior recital on May 9, 1967, and graduated with a bachelor of music degree the following month. She then studied for one year at the Juilliard School on a full scholarship during the 1967–1968 academic year before pursuing further training at the Mozarteum University Salzburg in 1969.

Quivar returned to the PAM for graduate studies with voice teacher Maureen Forrester who inspired her to pursue deeper studies in lieder. She concurrently taught her own students out of a private studio in Philadelphia and performed as a member of the Franklin Concert Series; an organization focused developing young professional artists. While Forrester's student, she won the Marian Anderson Award in 1970 and was accepted into the Metropolitan Opera Studio (the Met's training program for young singers) which was then directed by John Gutman. In 1968 and 1969 she was a finalist in the Baltimore Opera Company's singing competition; and ultimately won first prize in that competition in 1975.

In 1974 Quivar was the recipient of a Rockefeller grant, and in 1974 she was awarded a National Opera Institute grant. She returned to Juilliard in 1975 to train at the Juilliard Opera Center (JOC). She portrayed Ježibaba and the Foreign Princess in Dvořák's Rusalka with the JOC in 1975. She later studied privately with Marinka Gurewich in New York City and Luigi Ricci in Rome.

== Career ==
=== Initial work ===
While a student at PAM, Quivar won first place in a 1964 national singing contest sponsored by the Shriners organization at the Kiel Opera House in St. Louis. In April 1966 she was one of three winners of the Philadelphia Orchestra's Senior Student Concerts auditions whose prize included a contract to perform with the orchestra in one of their concerts during the 1966–1967 season. She made her debut with the orchestra under the baton of Eugene Ormandy on April 3, 1967 at the Academy of Music; singing the arias "Voi lo sapete, o mamma" from Cavalleria Rusticana, "Ah, scostati!" from Così fan tutte, and "Seguidilla" from Carmen in a concert in which she shared top billing with pianist Rudolf Serkin. She had previously made her professional recital debut at Hainer Hall in Toms River, New Jersey on November 13, 1966.

Other professional engagements soon followed. She gave a recital as part of the Festival of the Classics in Paoli, Pennsylvania in July 1967; a performance which was filmed for local television broadcast. In September 1967 she was a soloist in Ralph Vaughan Williams's Serenade to Music performed with the Chamber Symphony of Philadelphia and the James Aliferis Singers at the Academy of Music. In April 1968 she performed in concert with Met baritone Sherrill Milnes with the Opera Society of Vineland. This was followed by recitals given at Moore College of Art and Design (1968 and 1974) Cheyney State College (1969), the Museum of the Philadelphia Civic Center (1971), and the Corn Palace (1973). She was also a regular performer in the Franklin Concerts recital series beginning with its inaugural concert in 1968 and through 1970s.

On February 26, 1970 she sang the role of Zempoalla in a concert version of Henry Purcell's opera The Indian Queen given at the Philadelphia Museum of Art in what was billed as the work's American premiere. The following month she gave a joint recital with soprano Deborah Cook at the Academy of Music Ballroom. In December 1970 she was the alto soloist in Handel's Messiah with the Erie Philharmonic; a work she repeated with the Seattle Symphony in 1974. In January 1971 she performed the title role in Carmen in a concert version of the opera with the Greenville Symphony of Pennsylvania. The following month she gave a recital with classical guitarist Peter Segal at Pennsylvania State University.

=== Metropolitan Opera Studio ===
Quivar performed on an "Opera News of the Air" radio segment as a member of the Metropolitan Opera Studio (MOS) program; a program which aired during the intermission of a Metropolitan Opera radio broadcast of Carmen on February 6, 1971. In March 1971 she portrayed Suzuki in Madama Butterfly in a production presented by the MOS at the Seaside Hotel in Atlantic City as part of the national convention of the Music Educators National Conference. In July 1971 she portrayed Armelinde in the MOS's production of Pauline Viardot's Cendrillon given at the Newport Music Festival. In summer of 1972 she performed in an MOS concert entitled Shakespeare in Opera and Song given at Miami University.

Quivar toured with the MOS as Rosina in The Barber of Seville for performances at various American colleges and museums from 1972 to 1975; with an August 1975 performance of the role at the South Mountain Concert Hall being broadcast live on local NPR stations in Massachusetts and New York state. In 1974 she performed in a program of Viennese operetta presented by the MOS at the Goodman Theatre in Chicago. In 1975 she sang in a concert of opera arias featuring the MOS singers with the San Antonio Symphony and conductor A. Clyde Roller. That same year she portrayed Dorabella in the MOS's production of Così fan tutte given at the New Jersey State Museum.

=== Other early performances ===
At some point in her early career Quivar signed with talent manager Harold Shaw who assisted her in gaining employment with orchestras and opera companies. In November 1971 she performed a program encompassing music spanning seven centuries with conductor Maurice Kaplow and his Pennsylvania Orchestra at the Walnut Street Theatre. In April 1972 she was the alto soloist in Verdi's Requiem with the Philadelphia Orchestra and the Mendelssohn Club chorus led by William Smith at the Academy of Music. The following month she was a soloist in Bach's St Matthew Passion with the Westchester Philharmonic and in Mahler's Das Lied von der Erde with the Compton Civic Symphony. She repeated the former work at Avery Fisher Hall with the New Jersey Pro Arte Chorale led by conductor John Nelson in 1974.

In 1973 Quivar gave her first performance at Carnegie Hall as a soloist in Verdi's Requiem with the National Symphony Orchestra led by Charles Blackman. That same year she made her debut at the Lake George Opera as Tituba in Robert Ward's The Crucible; a role she repeated at the Lyric Opera of Kansas City in 1974. In October 1973 she was the featured soloist in the concert "Hear America First" given at the New York Cultural Center to celebrate the 50th birthday of composer Ned Rorem and the 75th birthday of composer Roy Harris. she returned to Carnegie Hall in 1975 as a soloist in Rossini's Stabat Mater Cincinnati Symphony Orchestra with the Cincinnati Symphony Orchestra led by Thomas Schippers. This latter work was recorded for Columbia Records.

In 1975 Quivar performed as a soloist in two concerts at Lincoln Center; singing in Franz Schubert's Lazarus with the New York Philharmonic (NYP) led by conductor Pierre Boulez and performing Camille Saint-Saëns's "La fiancée du timbalier" and "Pallas Athène" with the Cosmopolitan Symphony Orchestra. That same year she performed Benjamin Britten's Canticle II: Abraham and Isaac with tenor George Shirley live on WNYC-FM radio and for television broadcast, and was a soloist in Maurice Ravel's L'enfant et les sortilèges in a concert version of that opera given with the Detroit Symphony Orchestra (DSO). She also performed with the DSO in two return engagements in 1975; singing Johannes Brahms's Alto Rhapsody in September and as the alto soloist in Handel's Messiah.

In 1976 Quivar was a soloist in Gustav Mahler's Resurrection Symphony with the Cleveland Orchestra and conductor Lorin Maazel at Carnegie Hall, and also toured with that orchestra in performances of Verdi's Requiem. She had previously portrayed Serena in that orchestra's presentation of George Gershwin's Porgy and Bess at the Cleveland Masonic Temple in August 1975. The concert was recorded and released by London Records in 1976. It was the first recording of this opera to use Gershwin's complete score as originally written. It won the 1977 Grammy Award for Best Opera Recording.

In January 1976 Quivar sang in multiple concerts with the New Mexico Symphony Orchestra led by Yoshimi Takeda; performing Manuel de Falla's El amor brujo, a concert of Mozart and Verdi arias, and appearing as a soloist in Mahler's Symphony No. 1. She repeated El amor brujo with the NYP led by Bernstein in November 1976. In May 1976 she performed the role of Jocasta in a concert version of Igor Stravinsky's opera Oedipus rex with the San Francisco Symphony conducted by Ozawa, and appeared at the Cincinnati May Festival as a soloist in Beethoven's Symphony No. 9 led by Schippers. In November 1976 she returned to Lincoln Center to sing Edna St. Vincent Millay's "What Lips My Lips Have Kissed" with the NYP conducted by Leonard Bernstein. In the summer of 1976 she was a soloist in Sergei Prokofiev's Alexander Nevsky with the Los Angeles Philharmonic (LAP) and conductor Gennady Rozhdestvensky at the Hollywood Bowl; a work she also performed that year with the Philadelphia Orchestra. She was also heard with the LAP in the Verdi Requiem conducted by Robert Shaw. In December 1976 she was a soloist in the Messiah with the Boston Symphony Orchestra led by Colin Davis.

=== Metropolitan Opera ===
On October 10, 1977 Quivar made her Metropolitan Opera ("Met") début as Marina in Boris Godunov under the baton of Kazimierz Kord and with Martti Talvela in the title role. She was also seen at the Met in 1977 as Suzuki in Puccini's Madama Butterfly with Renata Scotto as Cio-Cio-San. In 1978 she toured with the Met in Boris Gudonov to Cleveland, and in 1979 she appeared with company as Fidès in Le prophète.

In the 1981–1982 season Quivar appeared at the Met as Jocasta in Oedipus rex, Isabella in L'italiana in Algeri, and in the roles of both Louis XV Chair and the Squirrel in L'enfant et les sortilèges. In the 1983–1984 season she alternated with Jessye Norman in the role of Jocasta. In 1985 she portrayed Serena in Porgy and Bess for the premiere of the Met's first staging of that opera which was mounted in honor of that opera's 50th anniversary. In 1987 she returned to the Met as Mother Marie in Dialogues des Carmélites; a role she had previously sung with the company in the 1983–1984 season. This production was filmed for PBS's Live from Lincoln Center. In 1989 she portrayed the Princess in Puccini's Suor Angelica with Teresa Stratas in the title role.

In 1991 Quivar portrayed Federica in Verdi's Luisa Miller with Aprile Millo in the title role, and appeared as Ulrica in Verdi's Un ballo in maschera. This latter production was filmed for television broadcast on PBS's Great Performances with Luciano Pavarotti as Riccardo. She sang Ulrica again at the Met in the 1992–1993 season, and the 1996–1997 season. In the 1994–1995 season she appeared at the Met as Frugola in Il tabarro. Her 101st and last performance at the Met was in a concert performance of Verdi's Requiem in 1997 where she sang the mezzo-soprano solos under the baton of James Levine.

=== Other opera performances ===
In 1977 Quivar performed the role of Suzuki to Joanna Bruno's Cio-Cio-San at the New Jersey State Opera. In January 1978 she portrayed Dorabella at the Virginia Opera with Susan Davenny-Wyner portraying her sister, Fiordiligi, and John Aler her lover, Ferrando. Later that year she portrayed Adalgisa to Renata Scotto's Norma at both OPERA/SOUTH (with Eve Queler conducting) and Opera Memphis (Anton Guadagno, conductor).

Quivar performed leading roles at the Theatro Municipal in Rio de Janeiro in 1980; making her debut there as Adalgisa in Norma. She performed at La Fenice in Venice in 1982 and 1983. In 1982 she portrayed Orfeo in the Deutsche Oper Berlin's production of Gluck's Orfeo ed Euridice. In 1983 she portrayed the title role in Bizet's Carmen with the Teatro dell'Opera di Roma at their summer home, the Baths of Caracalla. She returned to Berlin in 1985 as Erda in The Ring Cycle. That same year she performed at the Maggio Musicale Fiorentino and the Festival Internacional de Santander.

In 1987 Quivar portrayed Brangäne in Tristan und Isolde at the Los Angeles Opera. In 1988 she performed the role of Jocasta at the Teatro Colón, and appeared at Theater Bonn as Adalgisa. In 1989 she portrayed Dalila in Camille Saint-Saëns's Samson et Dalila at the Tulsa Opera with William Johns as Samson. She performed the role of Ulrica in Un ballo in maschera at the Salzburg Festival in 1989 and 1990. She also performed the role of Fenena in Nabucco at the 1989 Chorégies d'Orange festival.

In 1992 Quivar appeared at the Teatro Comunale di Bologna as Waltraute in Götterdämmerung. In 1993 she portrayed Eboli in Verdi's Don Carlos at the Seattle Opera; Dalila at the Vlaamse Opera; and Azucena in Il trovatore with Opera Pacific. In 1997 she performed the role of The Goddess of the Waters in the world premiere of Anthony Davis' opera Amistad at the Lyric Opera of Chicago. In 2000 she portrayed Jocasta at the Teatro Argentino de La Plata, and performed the role of Brangäne at the Houston Grand Opera. She returned to Chicago in 2003 to portray Addie in Marc Blitzstein's Regina.

Quivar's other opera credits include performances at the Bavarian State Opera, La Scala, and the Royal Opera at Covent Garden among others.

=== Other concert work ===
==== Late 1970s ====
In 1977 Quivar was a soloist in Roger Sessions's cantata When Lilacs Last in the Dooryard Bloom'd with the Boston Symphony Orchestra (BSO) led by Seiji Ozawa at the Tanglewood Music Festival; a work which she recorded with the BSO. That same year she toured as a soloist in Mahler's Symphony No. 3 with the Los Angeles Philharmonic (LAP) led by Zubin Mehta, and was also heard with Mehta and the LAP performing the part of the Wood Dove in Arnold Schoenberg's Gurre-Lieder. In May 1977 she returned to her alma mater (by then renamed the Philadelphia College of Performing Arts) to perform as a soloist in Beethoven's Missa solemnis under the baton of Joseph Primavera, and performed the part of Juliette in Hector Berlioz's Roméo et Juliette with the Toronto Symphony Orchestra under Andrew Davis.

Quivar returned to the Cincinnati May Festival in 1977 where she performed with the Cincinnati Symphony as a soloist in Franz Schubert's Mass No. 6, Felix Mendelssohn's oratorio Elijah (conducted by James Levine), and as Jocasta in Oedipus Rex. The following month she was a soloist in Mahler's Symphony of a Thousand with Levine leading the Philadelphia Orchestra; a work she also sang with the LAP under conductor Erich Leinsdorf in July 1977. In December 1977 she performed in Elijah with the SFS led by Edo de Waart, and was a soloist in Handel's Messiah with the BSO conducted by Colin Davis. The latter performance was filmed for broadcast on American television.

In 1978 Quivar was heard with the LAP again as a soloist in Mahler's Symphony No. 2 with Barbara Hendricks as her fellow soloist, and sang in Mahler's Das klagende Lied with the San Francisco Symphony (SFS) and fellow singers Kenneth Riegel and Patricia Wells. In July 1978 she performed the world premiere of Frederick C. Tillis's Spiritual Cycle; a song cycle for soprano and orchestra written for her which she sang at the Leonard Bernstein Festival of American Music held on the campus of the University of Massachusetts Amherst. In November 1978 she performed Prokofiev's Alexander Nevsky with the Philadelphia Orchestra led by Riccardo Muti at the Academy of Music; a work she also performed with the orchestra at Carnegie Hall.

Quivar was a soloist Verdi's Requiem in 1979 at Carnegie Hall with the LAP led by Carlo Maria Giulini. In May 1979 she performed in Mahler's Symphony No.3 with the Buffalo Philharmonic Orchestra led by Michael Tilson Thomas; a work she repeated with Thomas the following month with the Detroit Symphony. In December 1979 she was a soloist in Bach's Christmas Oratorio with the Seattle Symphony.

==== 1980s ====
In 1980 Quivar performed with the Chicago Symphony Orchestra led by James Levine at the Ravinia Festival in performances of Schubert's Mass No. 6 and Bach's St Matthew Passion. That same year she performed the part of Marguerite in Berlioz's La Damnation de Faust with the LAP and conductor Jesús López Cobos; sang the role of Judith in Bartok's Bluebeard's Castle with the Montreal Symphony Orchestra led by Charles Dutoit; and was a soloist in Beethoven's Missa Solemnis with the Houston Symphony Orchestra with conductor Erich Bergel. She returned to Carnegie Hall in Rossini's Stabat Mater with the Collegiate Chorale led by Robert Bass (1981); and as St. Theresa II in a concert version of Virgil Thomson's Four Saints in Three Acts (1981). This latter work was recorded, and was notably the first complete recording made of Thomson's opera.

In 1981 Quivar was a soloist in Beethoven's Symphony No. 9 with the St. Louis Symphony led by Leonard Slatkin, and sang at Indiana University of Pennsylvania for the inaugural performance of the newly built Frank and Mary Gorell Recital Hall. That same year she was a soloist in Mozart's Requiem with the New York Philharmonic (NYP) and the New York Choral Artists at Avery Fisher Hall under the baton of James Conlon; a work she later repeated at that theatre for the 1984 Mostly Mozart Festival under David Willcocks. She had previously sung in the 1982 Mostly Mozart Festival as a soloist in Beethoven's Missa solemnis under conductor Robert Shaw. That same year she sang Verdi's Requiem at the Metropolitan Opera House; replacing an ailing Marilyn Horne. Her fellow soloists included Leontyne Price, Plácido Domingo, and John Cheek. In February 1982 she performed Brahm's Alto Rhapsody with the Springfield Symphony Orchestra, and in November 1982 she was a soloist in Dvořák's Stabat Mater with the London Philharmonic Orchestra at Royal Festival Hall.

In 1983 Quivar was heard once again with the NYP in Gurre-Lieder with Mehta conducting, and also sang under that conductor in Mahler's Third Symphony with the Israel Philharmonic Orchestra. That same year she was a soloist at the Lucerne Festival, and performed in Bruckner's Mass in F minor at the Edinburgh International Festival. She also performed with the Orchestre de Paris.

In 1984 Quivar gave a concert with soprano Kathleen Battle at Alice Tully Hall, and later returned to that venue to give a solo recital in 1987. In April 1984 she performed in Mahler's Resurrection Symphony with conductor Simon Rattle and the Philharmonia Orchestra. In May 1984 and May 1987 she performed in Mahler's Third Symphony with the NYP. With the LAP, Placido Domingo and Paul Plishka she performed the world premiere of Michael Tilson Thomas's song cycle American Sing for the opening of the 1984 Summer Olympics.

In 1986 Quivar was a soloist in the Bach's St Matthew Passion with the NYP; performed Mahler's Des Knaben Wunderhorn with the Cleveland Orchestra; was a soloist at the Casals Festival; and performed with the Orchestre de la Suisse Romande under conductor Jesus Lopez-Cobos. In 1988 she was a soloist in Das klagende Lied with the NYP. In 1989 she performed Mahler's Kindertotenlieder song cycle with the National Arts Centre Orchestra, and performed in the United States premiere of the Messa per Rossini requiem mass at Lincoln Center with the NYP.

==== 1990s ====
In 1990 Quivar gave a recital at Weill Recital Hall with pianist Jeffrey Goldberg, and had two return engagemenst with the NYP at Lincoln Center performing the role of Stravinsky's Jocasta and as a soloist in Mahler's Third Symphony. In May 1990 she portrayed Erda in Wagner's Siegfried at the Accademia Nazionale di Santa Cecilia in Rome.

Quivar performed as a soloist in Edward Elgar's The Dream of Gerontius at the BBC Proms with the BBC Symphony Orchestra in 1991. In February 1991 she returned to Carnegie Hall as a soloist in Rossini's Petite messe solennelle with the Collegiate Chorale; a soloist in Mendelssohn's Elijah with the Cincinnati Symphony Orchestra; and in a tribute concert to Sarah Vaughan hosted by Bill Cosby in which she shared billing with Dizzy Gillespie and Roberta Flack. She once again sang Schoenberg's Gurre-Lieder for Zubin Mehta's final concert as director of the NYP in May 1991, and the following December was heard with the NYP again in Mozart's Requiem which was performed on the 200th anniversary of the composer's death.

In 1992 Quivar performed Michael Tippett's A Child of Our Time with soprano Roberta Alexander, conductor Simon Rattle, and the City of Birmingham Symphony Orchestra, and performed Verdi's Requiem with the Berlin Philharmonic led by conductor Herbert von Karajan. She returned to the Tanglewood Music Festival to sing with the BSO under conductor Christoph Eschenbach in performances of the Brahms Alto Rhapsody (1994) and Verdi's Requiem (1995). In July 1995 she performed in a concert with the Rushmore Festival Orchestra and conductor Lukas Foss at the Cathedral of St. John the Divine that was given to commemorate the 50th anniversary of atomic bombing of Hiroshima. The concert was narrated by Eli Wallach, Ellen Burstyn and Celeste Holm. The following November she performed Foss's Song of Songs with the NYP at Lincoln Center.

In January 1997 Quivar performed in Mahler's Third Symphony once again with the NYP. The following month she returned to Carnegie Hall to perform in a concert with the Orchestra of St. Luke's and conductor Robert Shaw which commemorated Marian Anderson's 100th birthday. In July 1998 she was a soloist with the NYP in Krzysztof Penderecki's Seven Gates of Jerusalem. In 1999 she was a soloist in Mahler's Symphony of a Thousand at the Schleswig-Holstein Musik Festival with the NDR Elbphilharmonie Orchestra; performed Mahler's Rückert-Lieder with the American Symphony Orchestra; and performed both Beethoven's Symphony No. 9 and Beethoven's Missa solemnis with the NYP.

In the 1990s Quivar took on the task of rescuing the works of forgotten composers, concentrating on those of African-American composers of the 19th and 20th centuries. Her stated goal is "to compile a program of these neglected composers and someday record them." This resulted in the concert "A Celebration of Black Composers" which she performed with pianist Wayne Sanders at the 92nd Street Y (1998) in New York and in concerts in Philadelphia and Cleveland.

==== 2000s ====
In 2001 Quivar performed in Verdi's Requiem with both the Cincinnati Symphony Orchestra and the Montreal Symphony Orchestra; sang in Beethoven's Ninth Symphony with the NYP conducted by Kurt Masur; and was a soloist in Mozart's Requiem with the Dessoff Symphonic Choir and conductor Gerard Schwarz at the Mostly Mozart Festival. She was heard again with the NYP in 2002 in Mahler's Third Symphony. That same year she was a soloist in Bernstein's Jeremiah Symphony with the New Jersey Symphony Orchestra under the baton of Zdeněk Mácal. She also performed as the soloist in Bernstein's Kaddish Symphony at the 2002 Cincinnati May Festival, and returned to the Tanglewood Festival in July 2002 to perform in Beethoven's Choral Fantasy with the BSO conducted by Ozawa.

Composer William Bolcom wrote his song cycle From the Diary of Sally Hemings for Quivar; a work whose text explores the relationship between American president Thomas Jefferson and the enslaved woman Sally Hemings. She sang it for its premiere at the Library of Congress on March 16, 2001. She has since performed the cycle in recitals throughout the United States in a tour with Harolyn Blackwell in 2002-2003. In 2005 she performed in a concert at the Salle Pierre-Mercure in Montreal with pianist J.J. Penna, and singers Kathleen Battle, David Daniels, Denyce Graves, Roberta Peters, and Measha Brueggergosman.

== Later life and teaching career ==
Quivar remained active active as a singer until the mid 2000s when she retired from performance. In 2007 she was one of 20 artists honored by the Settlement Music School at its 99th anniversary gala. Since 2014 she is a member of the adjunct vocal faculty at the Academy of Vocal Arts. She was interviewed in the 2019 PBS documentary film Once in a Hundred Years: The Life and Legacy of Marian Anderson.

== Discography ==
=== Choral and symphonic ===
Year	Title	Genre	Collaborators	Label	Reference
1977	Roger Sessions: When Lilacs Last In The Dooryard Bloom'd	classical	Seiji Ozawa; Tanglewood Festival Chorus; Boston Symphony Orchestra; Esther Hinds (soprano); Dominic Cossa (baritone)	New World Records	
	Rossini: Stabat Mater	classical	Thomas Schippers (conductor); Cincinnati Symphony Orchestra; Sung-Sook Lee (soprano); Kenneth Riegel (tenor); Paul Plishka (bass)	Vox Classic	
1981	Mahler: Symphony no. 8 in E flat	classical	Seiji Ozawa; Boston Symphony Orchestra; Boston Boy Choir; Tanglewood Festival Chorus; Judith Blegen (soprano); Faye Robinson (soprano); Deborah Sasson (soprano); Lorna Myers (mezzo-soprano); Kenneth Riegel (tenor); Benjamin Luxon (baritone); Gwynne Howell (bass)	Philips	
1985	Mendelssohn: Musik zu Ein Sommernachtstraum, op. 21 & op. 61 Ausschnitte	classical	James Levine (conductor); Chicago Symphony Orchestra and Chorus; Judith Blegen (soprano)	Deutsche Grammophon	
1986	Berlioz: Roméo et Juliette	classical	Charles Dutoit (conductor); Tudor Singers of Montreal; Montreal Symphony Orchestra; Alberto Cupido (tenor); Tom Krause (baritone)	London	
1987	Handel: Messiah	oratorio	Andrew Davis (conductor); Toronto Symphony; Toronto Mendelssohn Choir; Kathleen Battle (soprano); Samuel Ramey (bass), John Aler (tenor)	EMI Classics	
	Falla: El sombrero de tres picos (Three Cornered Hat)	classical	Jesús López-Cobos (conductor); Cincinnati Symphony Orchestra	Telarc	
1989	Verdi: Requiem	classical	Carlo Maria Giulini (conductor); Berlin Philharmonic; Simon Estes (bass-baritone); Sharon Sweet (soprano); Vinson Cole (tenor)	Deutsche Grammophon	
	Beethoven: Missa solemnis	classical	Helmuth Rilling (conductor); Bach-Collegium Stuttgart; Pamela Coburn (soprano); Aldo Baldin (tenor); Andreas Schmidt (baritone)	Hänssler Classic	
	Messa Per Rossini	classical	Helmuth Rilling (conductor); Prague Philharmonic Orchestra; Stuttgart Radio Symphony Orchestra; Gabriela Beňačková (soprano); Alexandru Agache (baritone); Aage Haugland (bass); James Wagner (Tenor)	Hänssler Classic	
1992	Schoenberg: Gurre-Lieder	oratorio	Zubin Mehta (conductor); New York Choral Artists; New York Philharmonic; Eva Marton (soprano); Gary Lakes (tenor); Jon Garrison (tenor); John Cheek (bass-baritone); Hans Hotter (bass-baritone)		
1993	Mahler: Symphony No. 3	classical	Zubin Mehta (conductor); Israel Philharmonic Orchestra	Sony Classical	
1994	Szymanowski: Stabat Mater Litany to the Virgin Mary; Symphony no. 3	classical	Sir Simon Rattle (conductor); City of Birmingham Symphony Orchestra and Chorus; Iwona Sobotka (soprano); John Connell (bass); Elżbieta Szmytka (soprano)	EMI Classics	
	Mahler: Symphony no. 2; Symphony No. 5	classical	Zubin Mehta (conductor); Prague Philharmonic Orchestra; Nancy Gustafson (soprano)	Teldec	
	Beethoven: Symphony No. 9	classical	André Previn (conductor); Ambrosian Singers; Royal Philharmonic Orchestra; Roberta Alexander (soprano); Gary Lakes (tenor); Paul Plishka (baritone)	RCA Victor	
1995	Mendelssohn: Elijah	oratorio	Robert Shaw (conductor); Atlanta Symphony Orchestra & Chorus; Barbara Bonney (soprano); Jerry Hadley (tenor); Thomas Hampson (baritone)	Telarc	

=== Opera recordings ===
Year	Title	Role	Cast	Label	Reference
1976	Gershwin: Porgy and Bess (Grammy Award winner)	Serena	Lorin Maazel (conductor); Cleveland Orchestra; Willard White (Porgy); Leona Mitchell (Bess); McHenry Boatwright (Crown); François Clemmons (Sporting Life); Barbara Hendricks (Clara); Barbara Conrad (Maria); Arthur Thompson (Robbins)	London Records	
1982	Thomson: Four Saints in Three Acts	St Teresa II	Joel Thome (conductor); Orchestra of Our Time; Betty Allen (Commère); Benjamin Matthews (Compère); Arthur Thompson (St. Ignatius); Clamma Dale (St. Teresa I); William Brown (St. Chavez); Gwendolyn Bradley (St. Settlement)	Elektra/Nonesuch	
1989	Verdi: Un ballo in maschera	Ulrica	Herbert von Karajan; Vienna State Opera Chorus and Orchestra; Josephine Barstow (Amelia); Plácido Domingo (Riccardo); Sumi Jo (Oscar); Leo Nucci (Count Anckarström); Jean-Luc Chaignaud (Christian Sailor); Goran Simic (1st Noble); Kurt Rydl (2nd Noble); Wolfgang Witte (Judge); Adolf Tomaschek (Servant to Amelia)	Deutsche Grammophon	
1991	Verdi: Un ballo in maschera (DVD)	Ulrica	James Levine; The Metropolitan Opera Orchestra and Chorus; Aprile Millo (Amelia); Luciano Pavarotti (Riccardo); Harolyn Blackwell (Oscar); Leo Nucci (Count Anckarström); Gordon Hawkins (Christian); Terry Cook (Count de Horn); Jeffrey Wells (Count Ribbing); Charles Anthony (Judge); Richard Fracker (Servant to Amelia)	Deutsche Grammophon	
1992	Verdi: Luisa Miller	Federica	James Levine (conductor); Metropolitan Opera Chorus and Orchestra; Plácido Domingo (Rodolfo); Vladimir Chernov (Miller); Aprile Millo (Luisa); Wendy White (Laura); Jan-Hendrik Rootering (Walter)	Sony	
1993	Stravinsky:Oedipus rex	Jocasta	James Levine (conductor); Chicago Symphony Orchestra; Philip Langridge (Oedipus); James Morris (Creon); Jan-Hendrik Rootering (Teiresias); Donald Kaasch (Shepherd); Jules Bastin (Messenger)	Deutsche Grammophon	
1996	James Levine's 25th Anniversary Metropolitan Opera Gala	Giuletta in an excerpt from Les contes d'Hoffmann	James Levine (conductor); Metropolitan Opera Orchestra and Chorus; Rosalind Elias (Niklausse); Alfredo Kraus (Hoffmann); Charles Anthony (Pitichinaccio); James Courtney (Schlémil); Paul Plishka (Dapertutto)	Deutsche Grammophon DVD	

=== Solo recordings ===
Year	Title	Genre	Collaborators	Label	Reference
1990	Ride on, King Jesus!	Traditional Spirituals	[Joseph Joubert] (piano); Larry Woodard (piano); Boys Choir of Harlem	EMI Records	
