= Raymond Hughes (conductor) =

American conductor and choral director (born 1952)

Raymond Hughes (born November 12, 1952, in Thomasville, Georgia) is an American conductor and choral director.

== Biography ==
=== Family ===
Raymond Hughes was born into a musical family of significant German heritage in the southwest Georgia town of Thomasville. His great-great grandfather, John Peter (Johannes Petrus) Arnold (1823–1893) emigrated from Boppard, Germany, in 1840 and founded Arnold Brick Yard, which provided building materials for many of Thomasville's eminent residences and commercial buildings until 1973. He is the elder son of jazz musician and businessman Samuel Osco Hughes (1922–2002) and the pianist and teacher Doris Sutton Hughes (1919–2006). As his father was one of the founding members of the Thomasville Entertainment Foundation, the local concert series, he grew up in a lively musical environment. He and the conductor William Fred Scott were close childhood friends. Scott's piano teacher was Hughes' mother.

=== Education ===
During his time at Thomasville High School, where he was a member of the National Honor Society, he was drum major of the Thomasville High School Band and began playing the organ at St. Thomas' Episcopal Church when he was 15, and subsequently at First Baptist and First United Methodist Churches. After graduating with honors in Liberal Arts (English, Political Science, and Music) at the University of Georgia in 1974, at which time he was inducted into Phi Beta Kappa academic honor society, he received an assistantship at the University of South Carolina, apprenticed to the Hungarian conductor Arpad Darazs as assistant conductor of the University of South Carolina Concert Choir. While a graduate student at USC, he also worked as music director and organist at Main Street United Methodist Church in Columbia. In the summer of 1976, the USC Concert Choir took First Prizes in all categories at the Béla Bartók Choral Competition in Debrecen, Hungary. He also studied conducting at Indiana University in 1975 and at the Aspen Music Festival in Colorado in 1976. He received a diploma in Russian from the Gorniy Institute in Saint Petersburg, Russia, in 1997, and studied Japanese at The New School in New York City in 2000 and 2001.

=== Professional ===
In 1977, he was contracted as coach and assistant conductor at the Pfalztheater in Kaiserslautern, Germany, where he made his conducting debut with the Tankred Dorst's and Peter Zadek's cabaret/revue Kleiner Mann – Was nun?, based on Hans Fallada's 1932 novel Little Man, What Now?. In the 1979/1980 season, he joined the music staff of the Nuremberg Opera, and from 1980 to 1984 he worked at the Staatstheater Mainz. From 1982 to 1984, he also worked as organist and music director at Hainerberg Chapel in Wiesbaden, where he also founded and conducted the Wiesbaden German-American Community Chorus in many concerts with orchestra.

In 1984, after seven years in Germany, he accepted an appointment as resident associate conductor at the State Theatre in Pretoria, South Africa, where he made his opera conducting debut when he jumped in to replace Italian maestro Anton Guadagno in Johannesburg performances of Manon Lescaut in 1985. From 1986 to 1991, he worked as conductor and chorus master at the Cape Town Opera, making his conducting debut with Mozart's The Marriage of Figaro on February 15, 1986. During this time, he was also music director of the Philharmonia Choir of Cape Town, one of the oldest choral societies in the Southern Hemisphere, conducting Philharmonia's concerts with orchestra in Cape Town City Hall, including annual Easter performances of Handel's Messiah, Haydn's The Creation, Mendelssohn's Elijah, and Handel's Judas Maccabaeus for Hanukkah and the international premiere of Martin Kalmanoff's The Joy of Prayer, both in 1989.

In the summer seasons of 1986 and 1987, he guested as opera conductor at the Brevard Music Festival in North Carolina, and in 1989 and 1990, also worked as music director of the Opera School at the University of Cape Town.

During the 1990/1991 season, he commuted between Cape Town and Rome, Italy, where he worked at the invitation of Norbert Balatsch as conductor of the chorus of the Accademia Nazionale di Santa Cecilia, while continuing his commitment to the Cape Town Opera. In addition to preparing the Santa Cecilia chorus for numerous major works with the Santa Cecilia orchestra, he conducted performances of Carmina Burana at Villa Giulia in the summer of 1991.

Norbert Balatsch, as Hughes' professional mentor, recommended him to James Levine at the Metropolitan Opera in New York City, where Levine appointed him chorus master in 1991. He led the Met Chorus, the only full-time professional American Chorus, for 17 seasons. During this time he worked closely with many great stage directors, including Franco Zeffirelli (Carmen 1996; La traviata 1999) and Otto Schenk (Die Meistersinger von Nürnberg 1993; Don Pasquale 2006) During the 1996 season, and in subsequent seasons, under Hughes' direction, the Met Chorus appeared in concert in Carnegie Hall with Levine and the Met Orchestra in Berlioz's La Damnation de Faust, Verdi's Requiem, Schoenberg's Gurre-Lieder, Haydn's The Creation, and Stravinsky's Symphony of Psalms.

As a student of Russian language and culture, Hughes also closely collaborated with Valery Gergiev during the time of the Met's association with the Kirov Opera in Saint Petersburg in productions of Tchaikovsky's Pique Dame, Eugene Onegin, and Mazeppa; Shostakovich's Lady Macbeth of the Mtsensk District; and Prokofiev's War and Peace.

Hughes debuted in Carnegie Hall as conductor with Maurice Duruflé's Requiem on May 27, 2007.

After leaving the Met, he worked extensively as a free-lance conductor, clinician, consultant, and church musician in the US and in Italy until 2009, when he was appointed principal guest conductor of the Festival of the Aegean on the Greek isle of Syros. In that same year, he accepted the position of chorus master and conductor at the Norwegian National Opera in Oslo.

In 2012, he was appointed artistic director of the Thomasville Music and Drama Troupe in his home town in Georgia, which appeared in concert at the White House in Washington, D.C. on December 22, 2012. Concurrently with that position, he assumed leadership of the Thomasville Singers in 2013.

He has been a standing member of the jury of the Ekurhuleni Melting Pot Choral Competition – the largest choral competition on the African continent – in Johannesburg, South Africa since 2014, and since 2015 has also been on the faculty of the yearly Bel Canto Master Class for Opera Singers in Norway. In 2017 and 2018, once again conducted concerts in South Africa with the Philharmonia Choir of Cape Town and the Cape Symphony Orchestra.

He returned to Germany for the 2016/2017 season to work as chorus master of the Deutsche Oper Berlin, and in the 2017/2018 season, also worked in tandem with Martin Wright with the chorus of the Berlin State Opera.

In addition to his present work as assistant music director and organist at the Luisenkirche in Berlin, he rejoined the Music Staff of the Deutsche Oper for the second half of 2019.

== Awards and distinctions ==
- 1993: Distinguished Alumnus Award from the University of South Carolina
- 1998: Pinnacle Award for Lifetime Achievement from Thomasville/Thomas County Chamber of Commerce
- 2001: Distinguished Alumnus Award from Brevard Music Festival
- 2007: Honored by the New York chapter of the Richard Wagner Society for commitment to and engagement for German opera at the Metropolitan Opera
- 2015: Named Lifetime Honorary Cantor at St. Thomas Episcopal Church, Thomasville, Georgia

== Videography ==
- The Metropolitan Opera Gala 1991, Deutsche Grammophon DVD, 00440-073-4582, 2010
- James Levine's 25th Anniversary Metropolitan Opera Gala (1996), Deutsche Grammophon DVD, B0004602-09, 2005
