= Barbara Daniels =

Barbara Daniels may refer to:

- Barbara Daniels (cricketer)
- Barbara Daniels (soprano)
