= The Metropolitan Opera Gala 1991 =

Metropolitan Opera 25th anniversary opening night

- Deutsche Grammophon DVD, 00440-073-4582
- Genre: Opera and musical theatre
- Directed by: Brian Large
- Country of origin: United States
- Original languages: English, French, German and Italian

Production
- Executive producer: Peter Gelb
- Producers: Joseph Angotti; Louisa Briccetti
- Editor: Gary Bradley
- Running time: 179 minutes
- Production company: Deutsche Grammophon

Original release
- Network: Cablevision
- Release: 23 September 1991

The Metropolitan Opera Gala 1991 was a four-hour concert staged by the Metropolitan Opera on 23 September 1991 to celebrate the 25th anniversary of its opening night in its second home at Lincoln Center. It was televised by Cablevision, and issued by Deutsche Grammophon on Laserdisc and VHS videocassette in 1992 and on DVD in 2010.

== Background ==
Originally based in a theatre on the junction of Broadway and 39th Street in New York City, the Metropolitan Opera began performing in its second home at Lincoln Center in 1966, starting the second phase of its life with the première of an opera commissioned for the occasion, Samuel Barber's Antony and Cleopatra. The Met celebrated the silver anniversary of that event with a gala that lasted for some four hours.

The event began with Luciano Pavarotti, Nicolai Ghiaurov, Leo Nucci, Cheryl Studer and Birgitta Svendén in the last act of Otto Schenk's production of Rigoletto, a staging in which Pavarotti had appeared at its first outing two years earlier. Plácido Domingo, Charles Anthony, Dwayne Croft, Justino Díaz, Mirella Freni and Paul Plishka followed in the third act of Franco Zeffirelli's production of Otello. Hermann Prey, Croft, Barbara Daniels, Andrij Dobriansky and Anne Sofie von Otter concluded the gala in a performance of an abridged version of the second act of Schenk's production of Die Fledermaus, deploying the theatre's revolving stage and incorporating eleven items sung by guests at Prince Orlofsky's party.

The original stage productions were supported by the Gramma Fisher Foundation of Marshalltown, Iowa, with supplementary help from Mr and Mrs Paul M. Montrone for Rigoletto, from Mrs John D. Rockefeller for Otello and from Mrs Donald D. Harrington for Die Fledermaus. The revival of Rigoletto was supported by the Edith C. Blum Foundation. The television broadcast of the gala was supported by the Texaco Philanthropic Foundation, Inc., the National Endowment For the Arts and the Charles E. Culpeper Foundation. The gala was jointly produced by the Metropolitan Opera, Cablevision, NBC, PolyGram and MAX Japan.

== DVD chapter listing ==
=== DVD 1 ===
- 1 (3:06) Before the performance: a glimpse behind the scenes
- 2 (1:24) The National Anthem

Giuseppe Verdi (1813-1901)

Rigoletto (Venice, 1851), with a libretto by Francesco Maria Piave (1810-1876), after Le roi s'amuse ("The king amuses himself", Paris, 1832) by Victor Hugo (1802–1885).

Presented in a stage production by Otto Schenk (b. 1930), with set and costume design by Zack Brown, lighting design by Gil Wechsler and stage direction by Sharon Thomas. Featuring Luciano Pavarotti as the Duke of Mantua, Cheryl Studer as Gilda, the Duke's daughter, Leo Nucci as Rigoletto, the Duke's court jester, Nicolai Ghiaurov as Sparafucile, a brigand, and Birgitta Svendén as Maddalena, Sparafucile's daughter.

Act Three

- 3 (2:43) "E l'ami?" - "Sempre" (Rigoletto, Gilda, Duke, Sparafucile)
- 4 (3:06) "La donna è mobile" (Duke, Sparafucile, Rigoletto)
- 5 (1:33) "Un dì, se ben rammentomi" (Duke, Gilda, Maddalena, Rigoletto)
- 6 (4:27) "Bella figlia dell'amore" (Duke, Maddalena, Gilda, Rigoletto)
- 7 (4:08) "M'odi! Ritorna a casa" (Rigoletto, Gilda, Sparafucile, Duke, Maddalena)
- 8 (5:58) "È amabile invero tal giovinotto" (Maddalena, Sparafucile, Gilda)
- 9 (4:33) "Della vendetta alfin giunge l'istante!" (Rigoletto, Sparafucile, Duke)
- 10 (1:42) "Chi è mai, chi è qui in sua vece?" (Rigoletto, Gilda)
- 11 (7:42) "V'ho ingannato... Colpevole fui" (Gilda, Rigoletto)

Giuseppe Verdi

Otello (Milan, 1887), with a libretto by Arrigo Boito (1842-1918), after The Tragedy of Othello, the Moor of Venice (?1603) by William Shakespeare (1564-1616).

Presented in a stage production and set designed by Franco Zeffirelli (1923-2019), with costume design by Peter J. Hall (1926-2010), lighting design by Gil Wechsler and stage direction by Fabrizio Melano. Featuring Plácido Domingo as Otello, a Moor, commander-in-chief of the Venetian fleet, Mirella Freni as Desedemona, Otello's wife, Justino Díaz as Iago, an ensign, Sondra Kelly as Emilia, Iago's wife, Uwe Heilmann as Cassio, a platoon leader, Paul Plishka as Lodovico, ambassador of the Venetian republic, Charles Anthony as Roderigo, a Venetian gentleman, and Dwayne Croft as a herald.

Act Three

- 12 (3:11) "La vedetta del porto ha segnelato" (A herald, Otello, Iago)
- 13 (4:54) "Dio ti giocondi, o sposo" (Desdemona, Otello)
- 14 (5:34) "Esterrefatta fisso" (Desdemona, Otello)
- 15 (4:09) "Dio! Mi potevi scagliar tutti i mali" (Otello, Iago)
- 16 (5:22) "Vieni, l'aula è deserta" (Iago, Cassio, Otello)
- 17 (1:47) "Come l'ucciderò?" (Otello, Iago, Chorus)
- 18 (2:57) "Il doge ed il senato salutano l'eroe" (Lodovico, Otello, Desdemona, Emilia, Iago, Roderigo, Cassio, Chorus)
- 19 (1:52) "Messeri! Il doge..." (Otello, Roderigo, Iago, Cassio, Lodovico)
- 20 (6:08) "A terra! Sì, nel livido fango" (Desdemona, Emilia, Cassio, Roderigo, Lodovico, Chorus, Iago)
- 21 (5:49) "Fuggite! Tutti fuggite Otello!" (Otello, Chorus, Iago)

=== DVD 2 ===
Johann Strauss II (1825-1899)

Die Fledermaus ("The flittermouse", Vienna, 1874), with a libretto by Karl Haffner (1804-1876) and Richard Genée (1823-1895), after Le réveillon ("The supper party", Paris, 1872) by Henri Meilhac (1830-1897) and Ludovic Halévy (1839-1908), after Das Gefängnis ("The prison", Berlin, 1851) by Julius Roderich Benedix (1811-1873), and with dialogue by Paul Mills adapted from that written by Otto Schenk and translated by Marcel Prawy (1911-2003).

Presented in a stage production by Otto Schenk, with set design by Günther Schneider-Siemssen (1926-2015), costume design by Peter J. Hall, lighting design by Gil Wechsler and stage direction by Paul Mills. Featuring Hermann Prey as Gabriel von Eisenstein, a wealthy gentleman of leisure, Barbara Daniels as Rosalinde, Eisenstein's wife, Barbara Kilduff as Adele, Rosalinde's chambermaid, Grace Millo as Ida, Adele's sister, Anne Sofie von Otter as Prince Orlofsky, a wealthy Russian, Andrij Dobriansky as Ivan, Orlofsky's servant, Dwayne Croft as Dr Falke, a notary, and Gottfried Hornik as Frank, a prison governor.

Act Two

- 1 (2:39) "Ein Souper heut uns winkt" (Chorus)
- 2 (2:11) Dialogue
- 3 (2:53) "Ich lade gern mir Gäste ein" (Orlofsky)
- 4 (0:39) Dialogue
- 5 (1:07) "Ach, meine Herr'n und Damen" (Orlofsky, Falke, Adele, Eisenstein, Chorus)
- 6 (3:40) Adele's Laughing Song: "Mein Herr Marquis" (Adele, ensemble)
- 7 (3:28) Dialogue
- 8 (4:36) Watch duet: "Dieser Anstand, so manierlich" (Eisenstein, Rosalinde)
- 9 (1:06) Dialogue
- 10 (5:04) Csárdás: "Klänge der Heimat" (Rosalinde)
- 11 (1:37) Dialogue

Party guests' sequence

Wolfgang Amadeus Mozart (1756-1791)

Die Zauberflöte ("The magic flute", K. 620, Vienna, 1791), with a libretto by Emanuel Schikaneder (1751-1812)

- 12 (5:58) Aria (Papageno): "Ein Mädchen oder Weibchen" (Hermann Prey)

Jacques Offenbach (1819-1880)

La Grande-Duchesse de Gérolstein (Paris, 1887), with a libretto by Henri Meilhac and Ludovic Halévy

- 13 (4:53) Aria (La Grande-Duchesse): "Ah! Que j'aime les militaires" (Frederica von Stade)

Gioachino Rossini (1792-1868)

Il barbiere di Siviglia, ossia L'inutile precauzione ("The barber of Seville, or The useless precaution", Rome, 1816), with a libretto by Cesare Sterbini (1784-1831), after Le barbier de Séville (Paris, 1775) by Pierre Beaumarchais (1732-1799)

- 14 (5:19) Aria (Figaro): "Largo al factotum" (Thomas Hampson)

Ambroise Thomas (1811-1896)

Mignon (Paris, 1866), with a libretto by Jules Barbier (1825-1901) and Michel Carré (1821-1872), after Wilhelm Meisters Lehrjahre ("Wilhelm Meister's Apprenticeship", 1795-1796) by Johann Wolfgang von Goethe (1749-1832)

- 15 (6:52) Aria (Philine): "Je suis Titania" (June Anderson)

Leonard Bernstein (1918-1990)

West Side Story (New York City, 1957), with a book by Arthur Laurents (1917-2011) and lyrics by Stephen Sondheim (b. 1930), after Romeo and Juliet (circa 1595-1597) by William Shakespeare

- 16 (3:28) Song (Tony): "Maria" (Sherrill Milnes)

Umberto Giordano (1867-1948)

Andrea Chénier (Milan, 1896), with a libretto by Luigi Illica (1857-1919), based on the life of André Chénier (1762-1794)

- 17 (6:55) Aria (Maddalena): "La mamma morta" (Aprile Millo)

Wolfgang Amadeus Mozart

Il dissoluto punito, ossia Il Don Giovanni ("The rake punished, or Don Giovanni", K. 527, Prague, 1787), with a libretto by Lorenzo da Ponte (1749-1838), after El burlador de Seville y convivado de piedra ("The trickster of Seville and the stone guest", ?1616) by Tirso de Molina (1579-1648)

- 18 (6:10) Catalogue aria (Leporello): "Madamina, il catalogo è questo" (Ferruccio Furlanetto)

Gaetano Donizetti (1797-1848)

Linda di Chamounix (Vienna, 1842), with a libretto by Gaetano Rossi (1774-1855)

- 19 (7:31) Aria (Linda): "O luce di quest'anima" (Kathleen Battle)

Mitch Leigh (1928-2014)

Man of La Mancha (New York City, 1965), with a book by Dale Wasserman (1914-2008) and lyrics by Joe Darion (1917-2001), after Wasserman's teleplay I, Don Quixote (1959), after El ingenioso hidalgo Don Quijote de la Mancha ("The ingenious gentleman Don Quixote of La Mancha", 1605-1615) by Miguel de Cervantes (1547-1616)

- 20 (4:23) Song (Don Quixote): "The impossible dream" (Samuel Ramey)

Francesco Cilea (1866-1950)

Adriana Lecouvreur (Milan, 1902), with a libretto by Arturo Colautti (1851-1914), after Adrienne Lecouvreur (1849) by Eugène Scribe (1791-1861) and Ernest Legouvé (1807-1903)

- 21 (5:25) Aria (Adriana): "Io son l'umile ancella" (Mirella Freni)

Giacomo Puccini (1858-1924)

La Bohème ("The Bohemian", Turin, 1896), with a libretto by Luigi Illica and Giuseppe Giacosa (1847-1906), after Scènes de la vie de bohème ("Scenes of Bohemian life", 1851) by Henri Murger (1822-1861)

- 22 (6:45) Duet (Marcello and Rodolfo): "In un coupé?... O Mimi, tu più non torni" (Luciano Pavarotti and Plácido Domingo)

Johann Strauss II

Die Fledermaus (resumed)

- 23 (4:20) Champagne song: "Champagner hats verschuldet" (All)
- 24 (0:26) Closing credits

== Personnel ==
=== Artists ===
- June Anderson (b. 1952), soprano
- Charles Anthony (1929-2012), tenor
- Kathleen Battle (b. 1948), soprano
- Dwayne Croft, baritone
- Barbara Daniels, soprano
- Justino Díaz (b. 1940), bass-baritone
- Andrij Dobriansky (1930-2012), bass-baritone
- Plácido Domingo (b. 1941), tenor
- Mirella Freni (1935-2020), soprano
- Ferruccio Furlanetto (b. 1949), bass
- Nicolai Ghiaurov (1929-2004), bass
- Thomas Hampson (b. 1955), baritone
- Uwe Heilmann (b. 1960), tenor
- Gottfried Hornik (b. 1940), baritone
- Sondra Kelly, mezzo-soprano
- Barbara Kilduff, soprano
- Aprile Millo (b. 1958), soprano
- Grace Millo, soprano
- Sherrill Milnes (b. 1935), baritone
- Leo Nucci (b. 1942), baritone
- Anne Sofie von Otter (b. 1955), mezzo-soprano
- Luciano Pavarotti (1935-2007), tenor
- Paul Plishka (b. 1941), bass
- Hermann Prey (1929-1998), baritone
- Samuel Ramey (b. 1942), bass
- Frederica von Stade (b. 1945), mezzo-soprano
- Cheryl Studer (b. 1955), soprano
- Birgitta Svendén (b. 1952), mezzo-soprano
- Metropolitan Opera Ballet
- Diana Levy, ballet mistress
- Metropolitan Opera Chorus
- Raymond Hughes, chorus master
- Gildo di Nunzio, stage band conductor (Otello)
- Metropolitan Opera Orchestra
- Raymond Gniewek (1931-2021), concertmaster
- James Levine (1943–2021), conductor

=== Metropolitan Opera personnel ===
- Joan Dornemann, musical preparation
- Jane Klaviter, musical preparation and prompter
- David Kneuss, executive stage manager
- Stephen A. Brown, stage manager
- Thomas H. Connell III, stage manager
- Gary Dietrich, stage manager
- William McCourt, stage manager
- Raymond Menard, stage manager
- Scott Moon, stage manager
- Stephen Diaz, master carpenter
- Sander Hacker, master electrician
- Edward McConway, properties master
- Magda Szayer, wig and hair stylist
- Victor Callegari, make-up artist
- Millicent Hacker, wardrobe mistress
- Richard Wagner, costume shop head

=== Broadcast personnel ===
- Peter Gelb (b. 1953), executive producer
- Brian Large (b. 1939), director
- Joseph Angotti, producer
- Louisa Briccetti, producer
- Daniel Anker, coordination producer
- Suzanne Gooch, associate producer
- Carol Stowe, associate director
- Mark Schubin, engineer-in-charge
- Jay David Saks, audio producer
- Alan Adelman, lighting design
- Tony Pascento, lighting associate
- Ron Washburn, senior technician
- Emmett Loughran, technical director
- Bill King, audio supervisor
- Mel Becker, audio engineer
- Tom Carroll, audio engineer
- Paul Cohen, audio engineer
- Louise de la Fuente, audio engineer
- Jim Jordan, audio engineer
- Kathleen King, audio engineer
- Larry Loewinger, audio engineer
- Peter Miller, audio engineer
- Blake Norton, audio engineer
- Bruce Shapiro, audio engineer
- Michael Shoskes, audio engineer
- Suzanne Sousa, audio engineer
- Robert M. Tannenbaum, audio engineer
- Elaine Warner, audio engineer
- Susan Noll, video engineer
- Matty Randazzo, video engineer
- Paul Ranieri, video engineer
- William Steinberg, video engineer
- William Akerlund, camera operator
- Miguel Armstrong, camera operator
- Juan Barrera, camera operator
- Jim Covello, camera operator
- John Feher, camera operator
- Manny Gutierrez, camera operator
- Charlie Huntley, camera operator
- Tom Hurwitz, camera operator
- Don Lenzer, camera operator
- Mike Lieberman, camera operator
- Ed Marritz, camera operator
- Alain Onesto, camera operator
- Jake Ostroff, camera operator
- Bob Richman, camera operator
- David Smith, camera operator
- Larry Solomon, camera operator
- Alan Buchner, videotape engineer
- Jack Roche, videotape engineer
- Barry Fialk, Chyron engineer
- Bruce Balton, crane technician
- Rob Balton, crane technician
- Ernie Jew, remote camera technician
- Terence Benson, television stage manager
- Margi Kerns, television stage manager
- Uwe Lehmann, television stage manager
- Hank Niemark, television stage manager
- James O'Gorman, television stage manager
- Karen McLaughlin, music associate
- Susan Erben, producer's assistant
- Rae M. Cazzola, production secretary
- Juan Pablo Gamboa, production assistant
- Jessica Ruskin, production assistant
- Olga Losada, camera script
- Peter Dahlstrom, Unitel mobile video
- Dan Doolan, Unitel mobile video
- Michael R. Jones, Unitel mobile video
- Phil Gitomer, remote recording services
- David Hewitt, remote recording services
- Vin Gizzi, audio post-production
- Gary Bradley, editor
- Pat Jaffe, opening segment producer
- Susan Greene, executive in charge

=== DVD production personnel ===
- Burkhard Bartsch, project manager
- Veronika Holek, project coordinator
- Harald Gericke, producer, Platin Media Productions, Langenhagen
- Daniel Kemper, authoring, encoding and AMSI surround sound engineer, Platin Media Productions
- Michaela Jürgens, screen design, Platin Media Productions
- Monica Ling, subtitles
- Eva Reisinger, booklet editor, Texthouse
- Merle Kersten, art direction, Texthouse

== Critical reception ==
=== Reviews ===
Edward Rothstein reviewed the gala in The New York Times on 25 September 1991. The Met's first night at Lincoln Center, he recalled, had been an utter catastrophe, and the gala celebrating its silver anniversary in its second theatre had begun with disappointments just as discouraging as those of the première of Barber's Antony and Cleopatra in 1966.

The third act of Rigoletto began the concert with "a nearly funereal mood, and not quite the one anybody had in mind". Luciano Pavarotti's "groping make-out scene" with the injudiciously cast Birgitta Svendén was unfortunate, and his singing did not show him at his best. His voice sounded constricted, and a histrionic laugh could not conceal that a climactic note had cracked. An excerpt "drained of human characters, offering pasteboard roles and posing voices" was partly redeemed by the force and personality of Nicolai Ghiaurov as Sparafucile.

Matters improved with the third act of Otello, but only marginally. Justino Díaz was "curiously insubstantial" as Iago, and Plácido Domingo "stolid" as the Moor of Venice. Mirella Freni exhibited her ability to sing high notes very loudly. Conducting, James Levine "seemed to treat the music as a collection of fragments designed for glitter and response ... belting out exclamations with little thought for proportion and sense and drama". One began to question whether the idea of turning bleeding chunks of operas into showcases for celebrities might not be essentially misconceived.

But the feeling of the evening lifted abruptly with the second act of Die Fledermaus. Hermann Prey's "winsome" Eisenstein and Barbara Daniels's "brash" Rosalinde introduced "a party that became a triumphant homage to the powers of the voice", as the tradition of interpolating guest appearances into Orlofsky's festivity was honoured in "one of the most exquisitely refined and extravagant assemblages of vocal artistry" in the Met's entire 108-year history.

Hermann Prey evoked memories of his 1966 Met Papageno with an aria that brought the bird-catcher to life with expressive artlessness. Thomas Hampson won an overwhelming ovation with the energy, accuracy and supernatural acting of his "Largo al factotum". Kathleen Battle combined delicately engraved phrasing and a tone of sensuous velvet in "O luce di quest'anima". Frederica von Stade was charming and kindly in "Ah! Que j'aime les militaires". Broadway was acknowledged by Sherrill Milnes in "Maria" and by Samuel Ramey in "The impossible dream". Ferruccio Furlanetto, currently starring at the Met as Don Giovanni, contributed Leporello's catalogue of his master's conquests.

June Anderson was immaculate and celestial in "Je suis Titania". Aprile Millo was suitably overcome by emotion in "La mamma morta". Mirella Freni was forcefully eloquent in "Io son l'umile ancella". And Pavarotti and Domingo joined forces in a duet from La Bohème, "clowning with scarves, clasping shoulders and hands and showing a subtle but good-hearted rivalry in their singing and bows".

All in all, despite its moments of strain and its lapses into vanity, the gala was "a grand-scale tribute to a great opera company", and one was left admiring the gifts of the evening's soloists and Levine's manifest affection for them.

The gala was also reviewed by Martin Bernheimer in The Los Angeles Times, by Peter G. Davis in New York Magazine and by Tim Page in Newsday. It was also discussed in Opera News, Opernwelt, Stereo Review and in Dantia Gould's The pay-per-view explosion (1991).

=== Accolades ===
The gala was recognized three times in the Primetime Emmy Awards for 1992. Brian Large won an award for Outstanding Individual Achievement - Classical Music/Dance Programming - Directing, and Plácido Domingo and Kathleen Battle both won awards for Outstanding Individual Achievement - Classical Music/Dance Programming - Performance.

== Broadcast and home media history ==
The gala was broadcast live on Cablevision pay-per-view television on 23 September 1991.

Deutsche Grammophon issued the gala in several formats, all with 4:3 NTSC colour video: a 181-minute pair of CLV (constant linear velocity) Laserdiscs (catalogue number 072-528-1) released in 1992, a 167-minute VHS videocassette (catalogue number 072-528-3) also released in 1992 and a 179-minute pair of Region 0 DVDs (catalogue number 00440-073-4582) released in 2010. The DVDs have audio in both lossless PCM stereo and an ersatz 5.1 channel DTS surround sound upmix synthesized with the AMSI II (Ambient Surround Imaging) technology created by Emil Berliner Studios. They have subtitles in Chinese, English, French, German and Spanish, and - although only for items sung in that language - Italian, and are accompanied by a 24-page booklet with four photographs and an essay by Richard Evidon in English, French and German.

== Gallery of artists ==
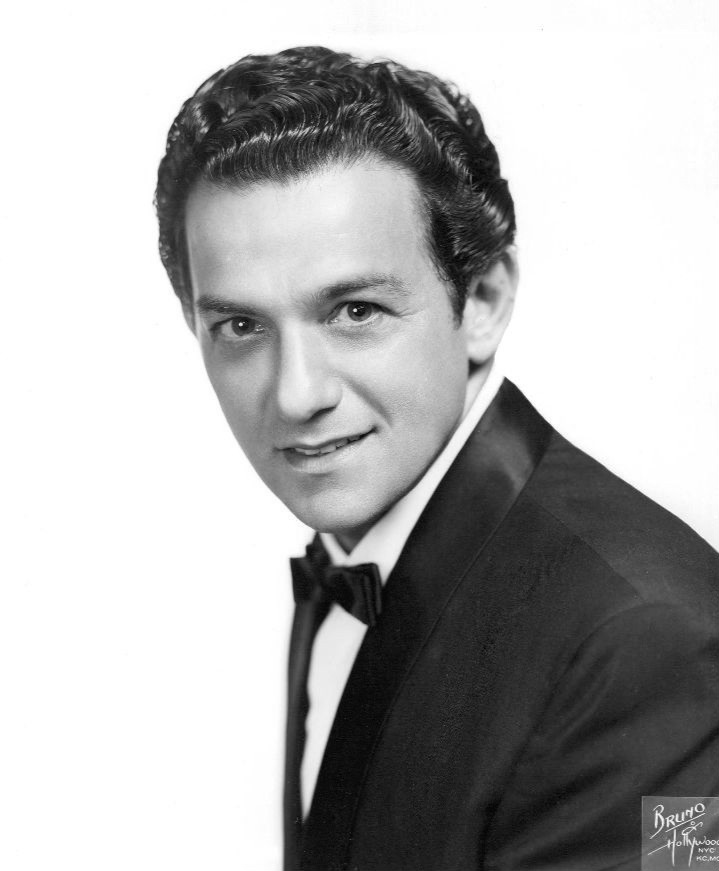
Charles Anthony

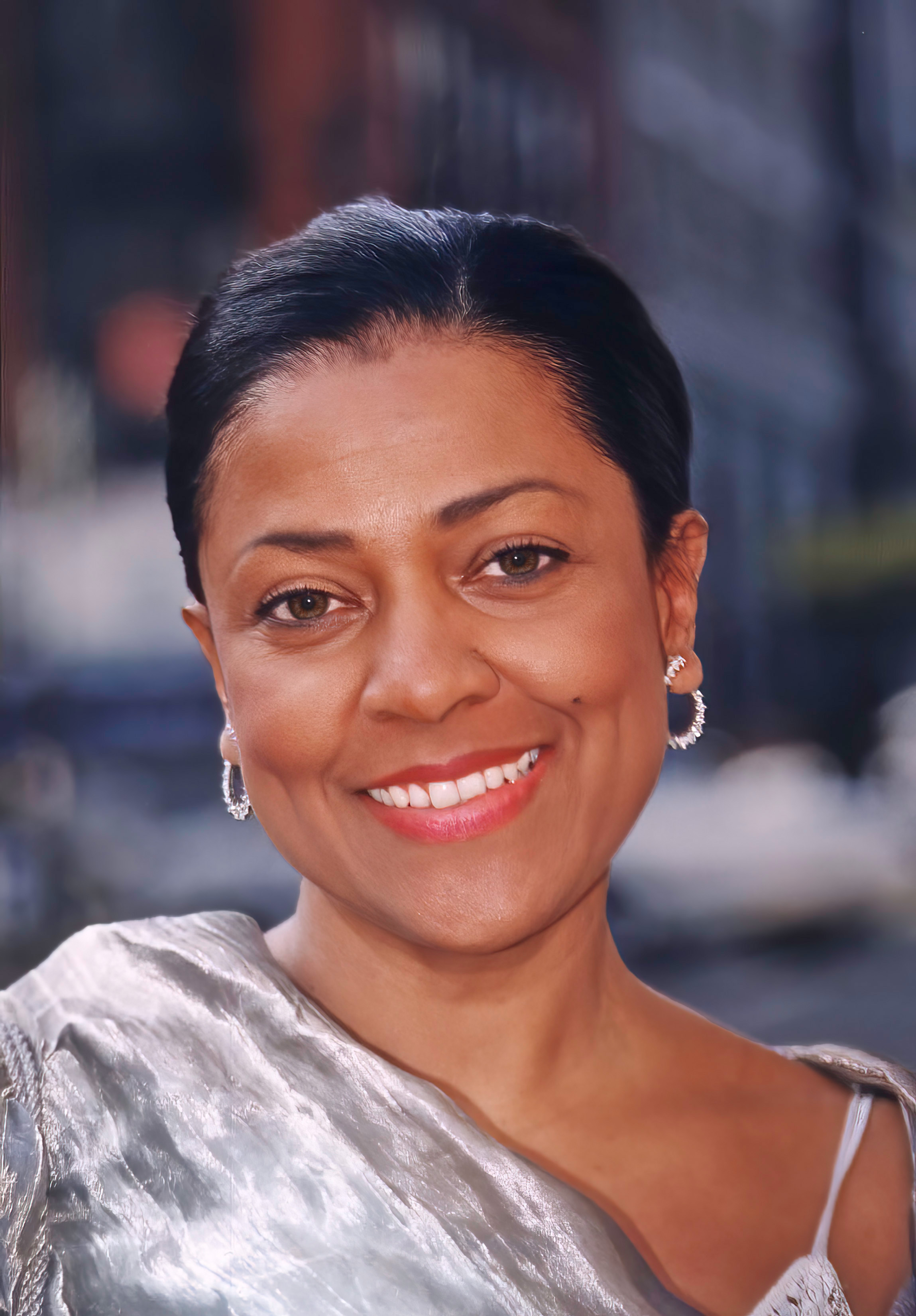
Kathleen Battle

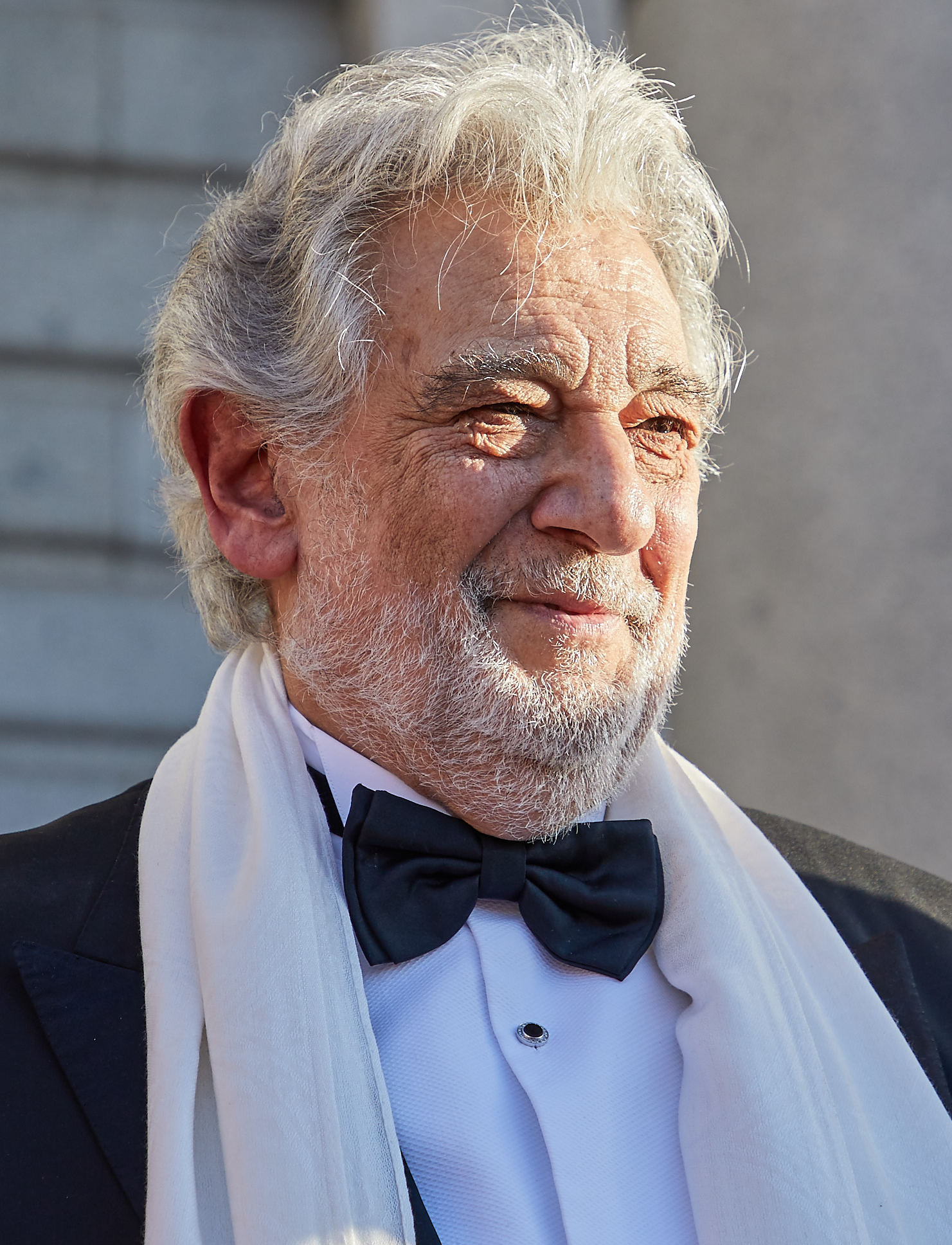
Plácido Domingo

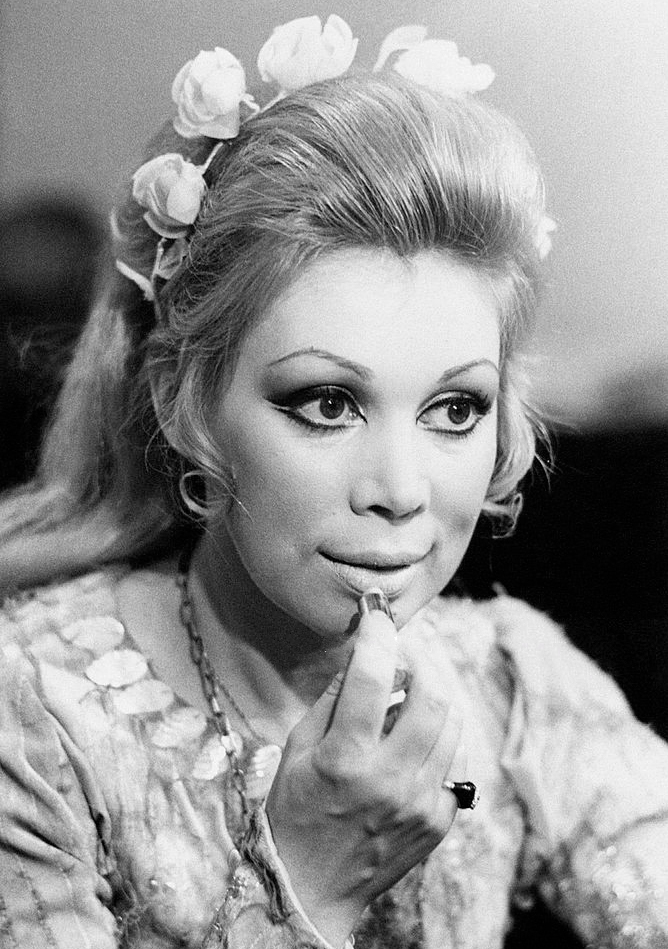
Mirella Freni

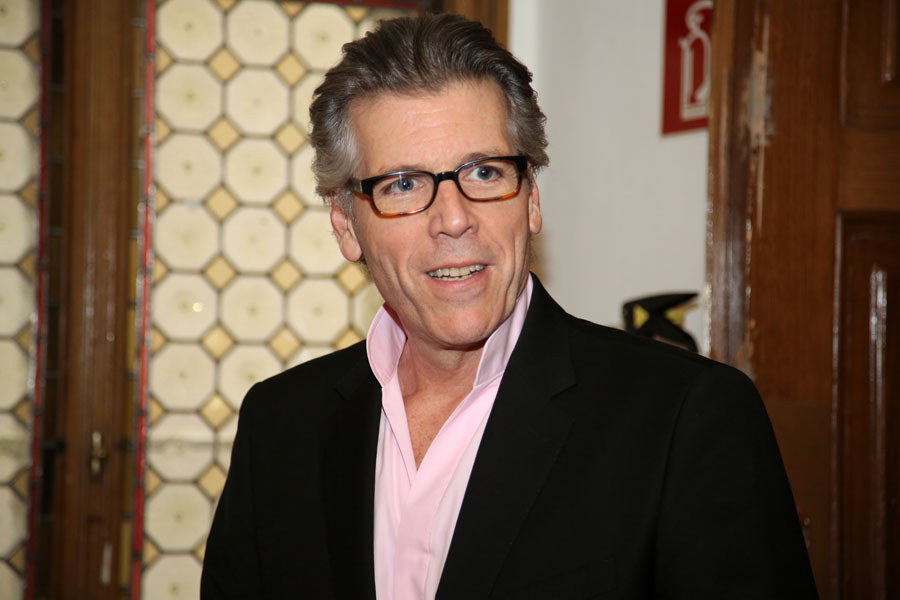
Thomas Hampson

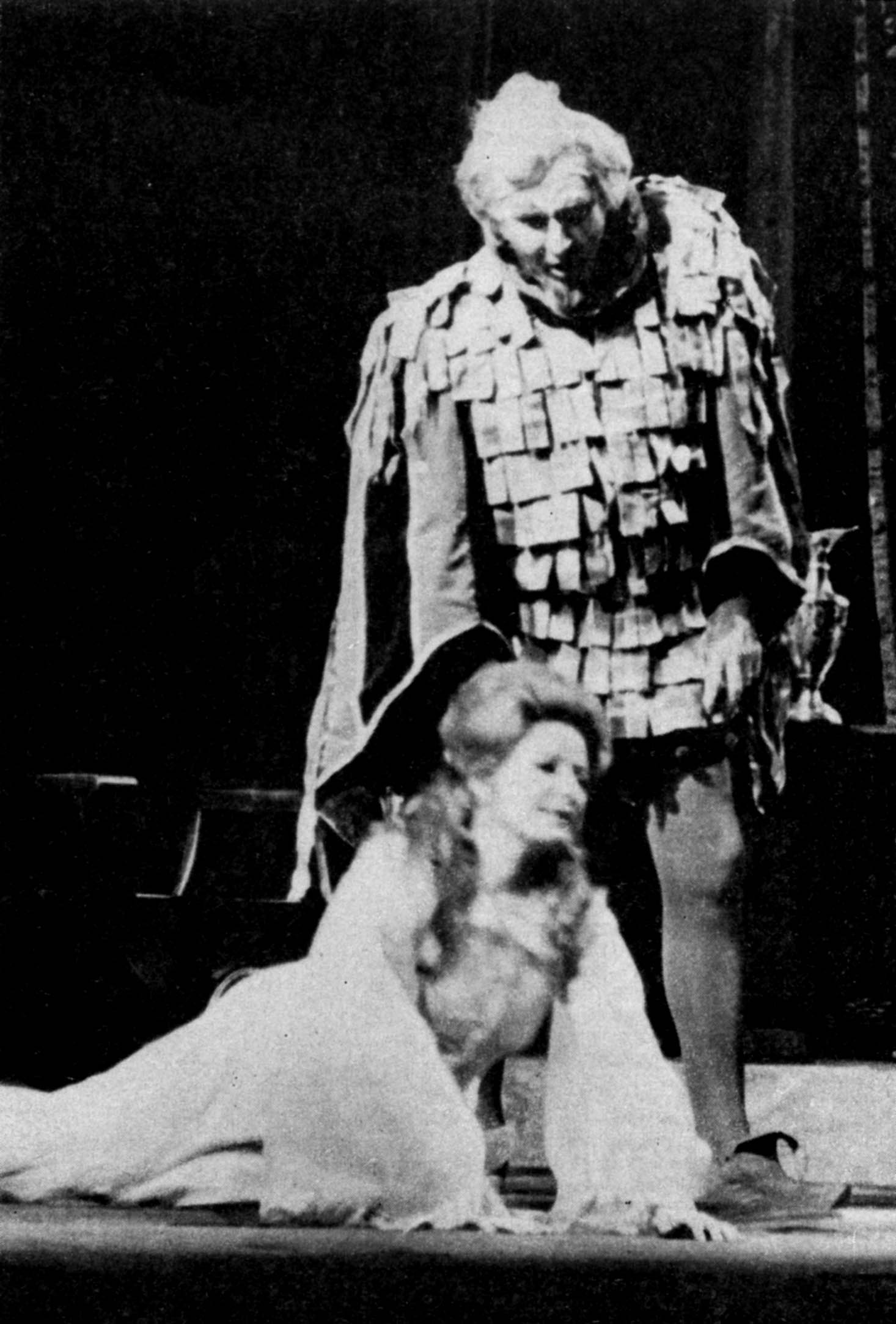
Sherrill Milnes

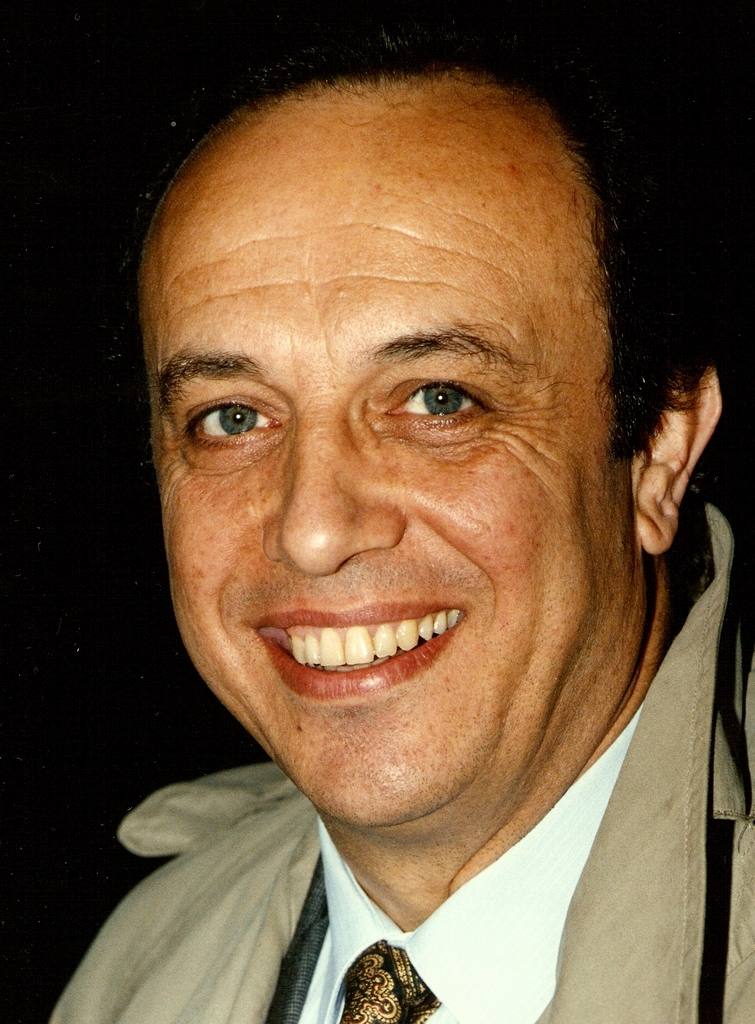
Leo Nucci

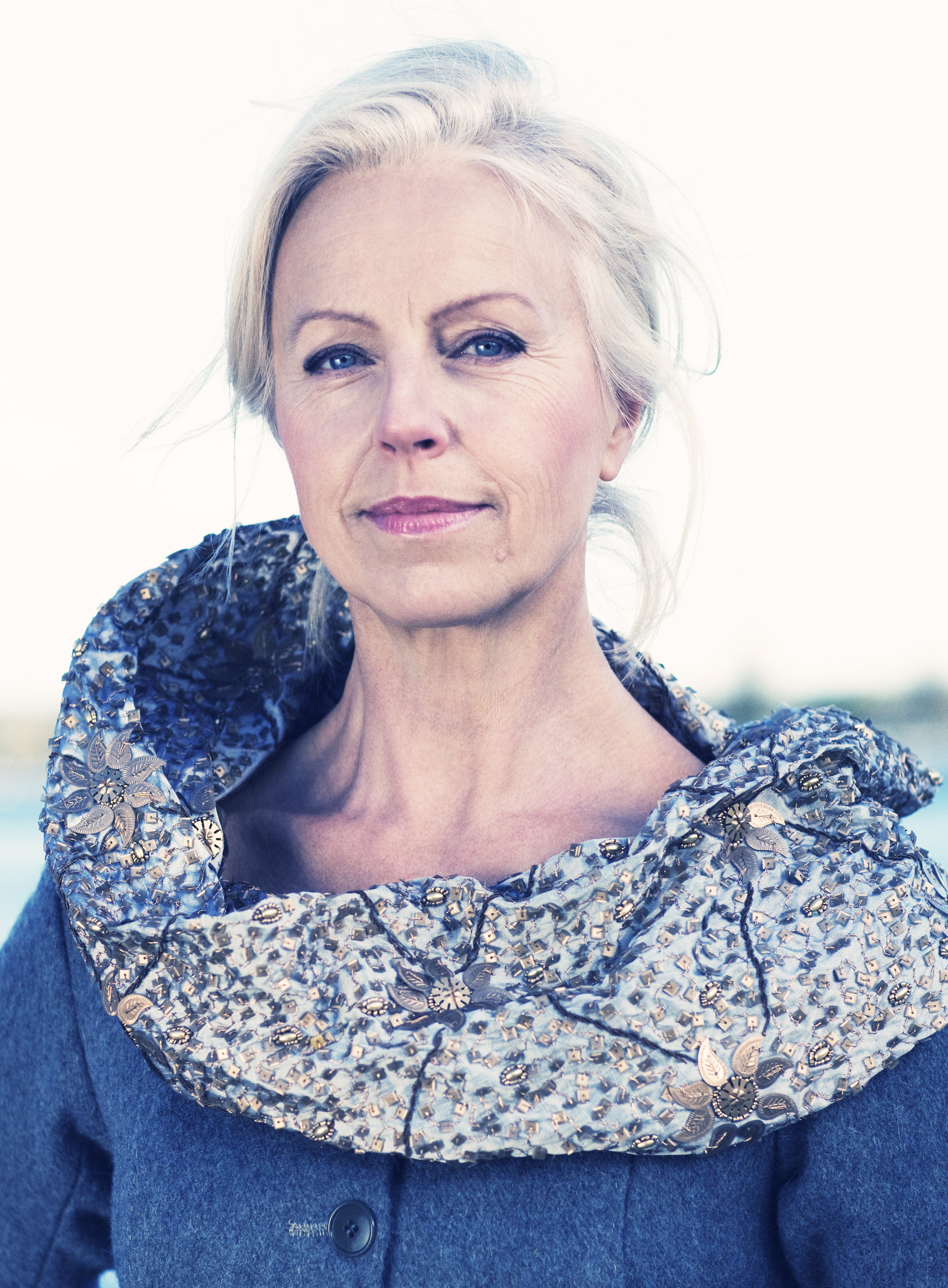
Anne Sofie von Otter

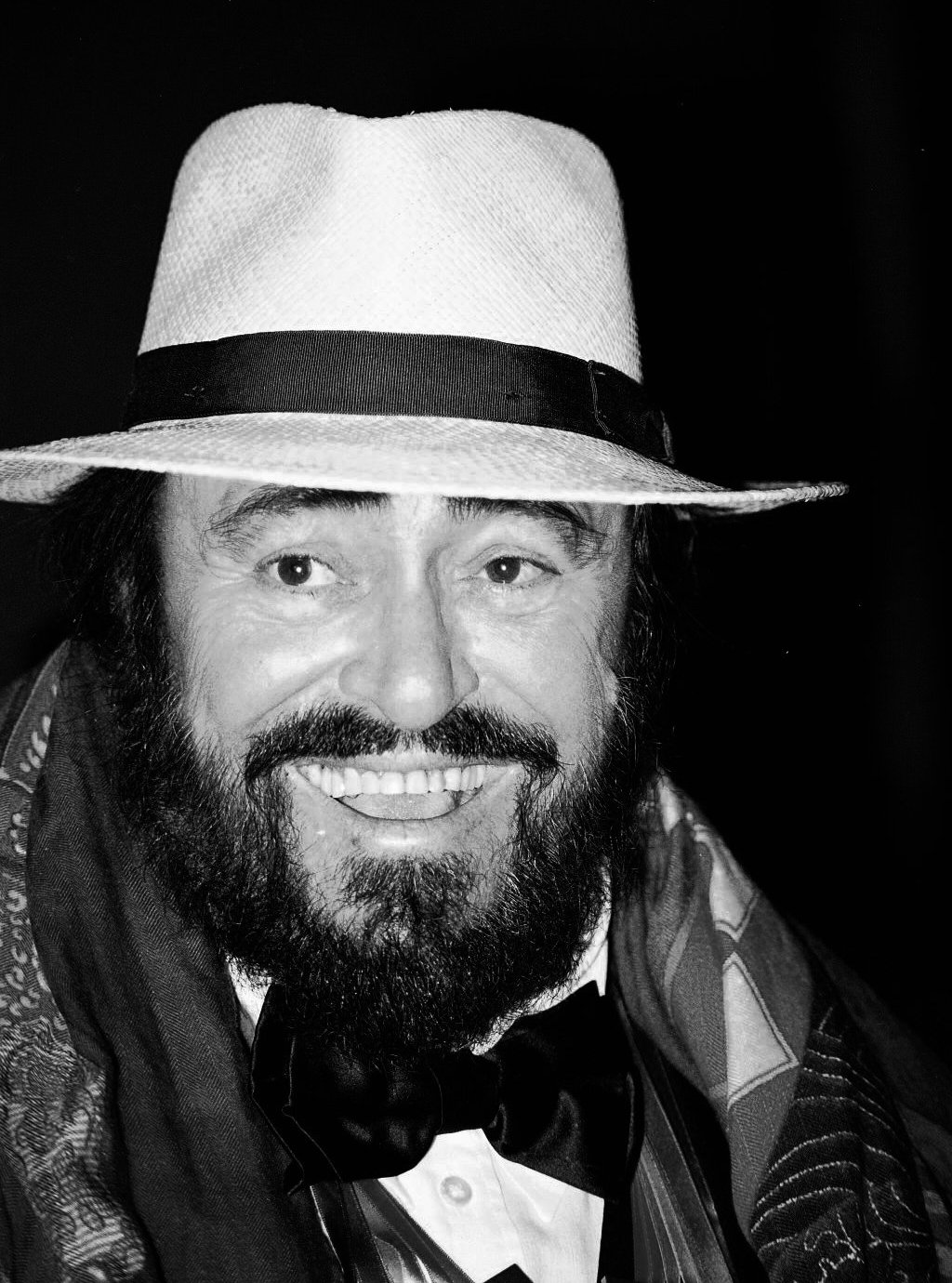
Luciano Pavarotti

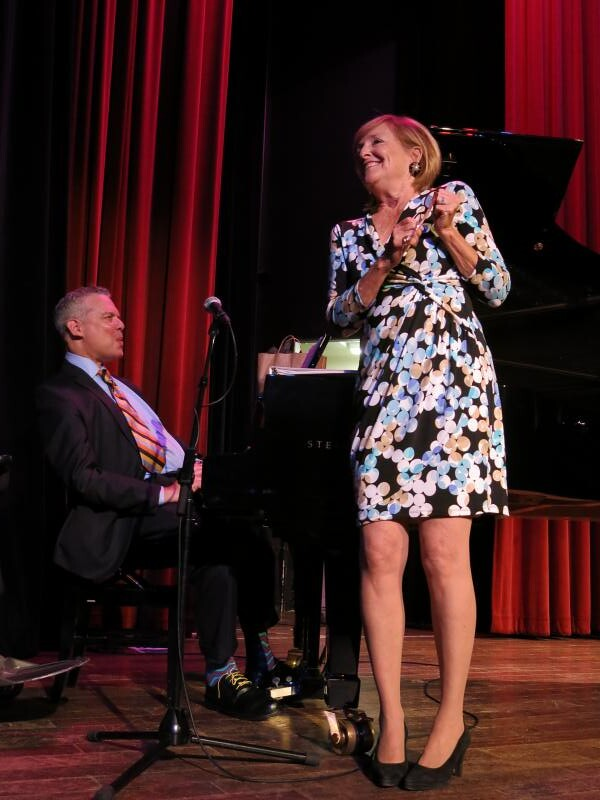
Frederica von Stade

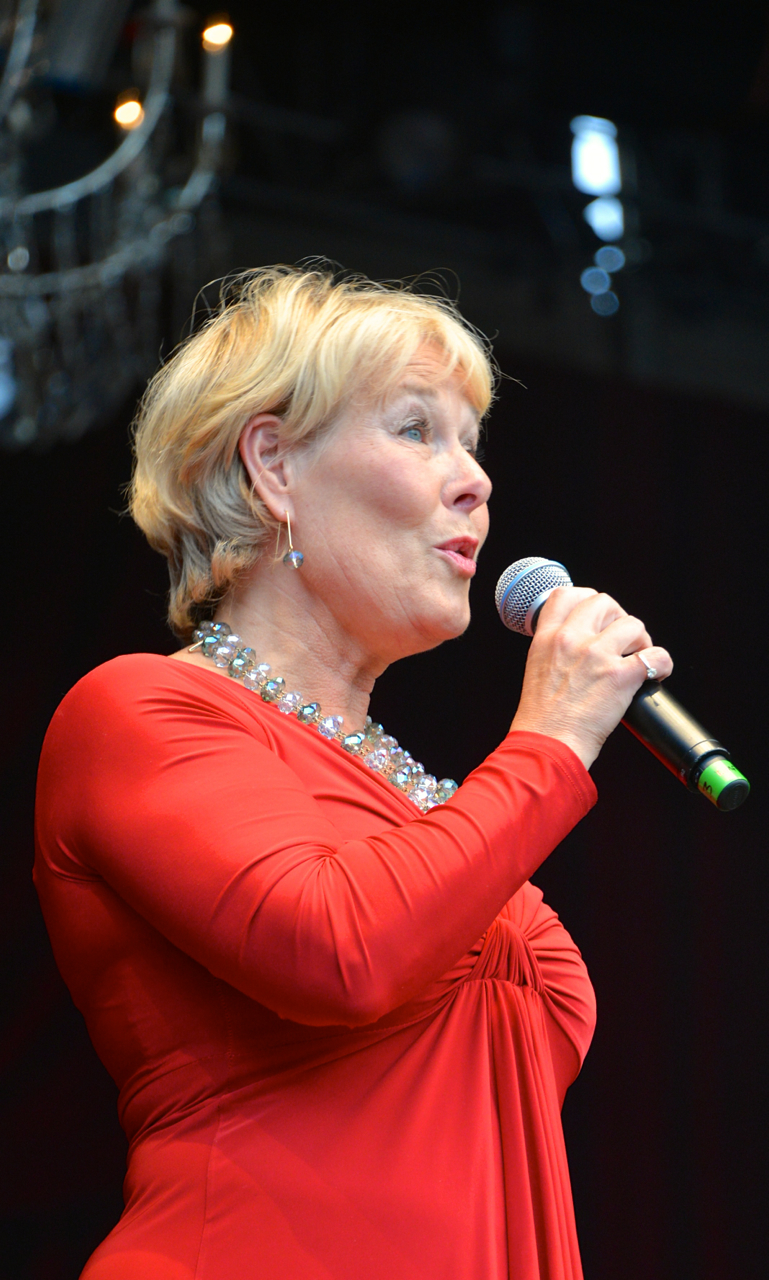
Birgitta Svendén

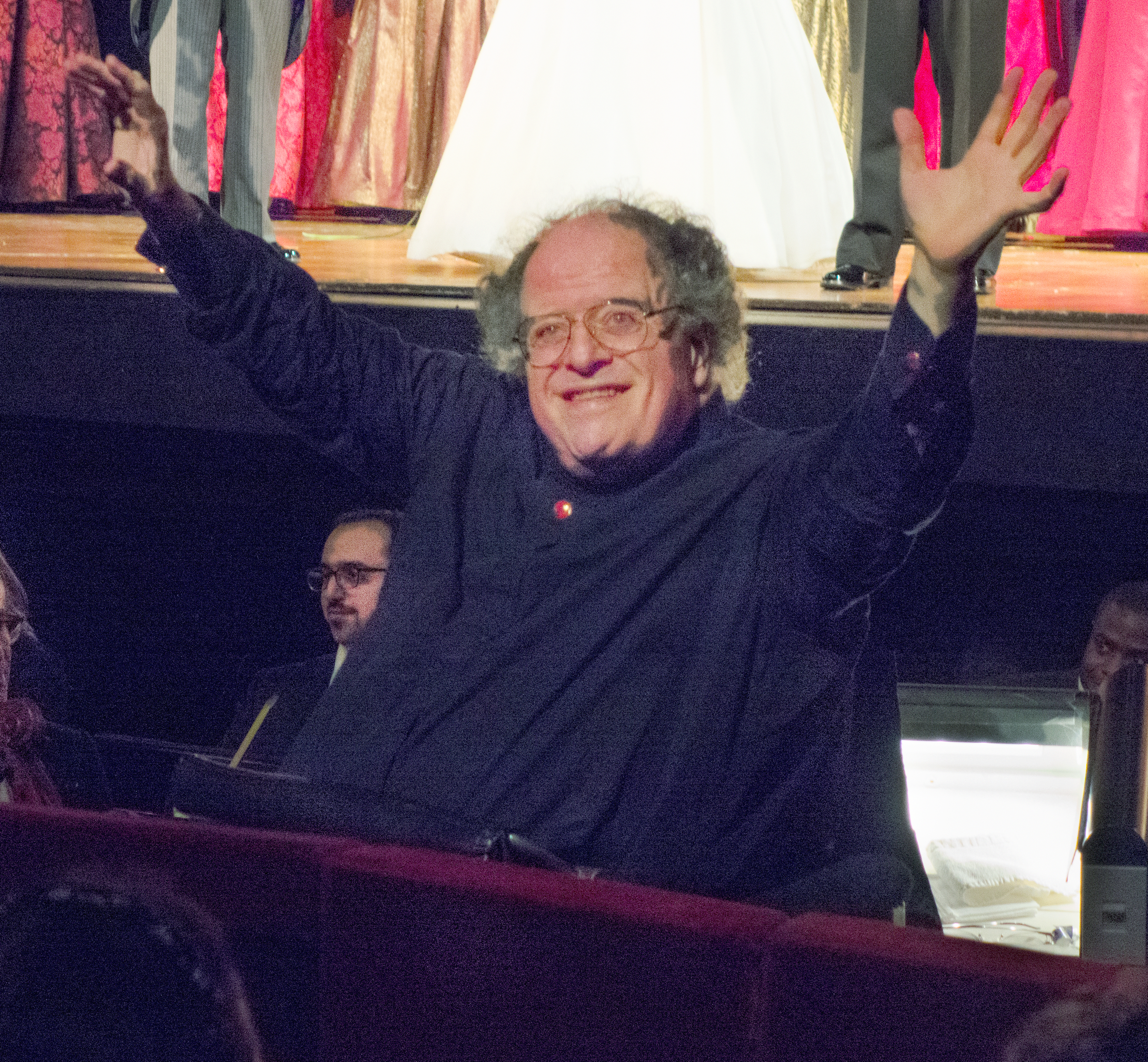
James Levine

== See also ==
- The Metropolitan Opera Centennial Gala
- James Levine's 25th Anniversary Metropolitan Opera Gala
