= Larry Woodard =

American pianist and singer (born 1949)

- Born: February 25, 1949 (age 77); Chicago, Illinois, United States
- Died: June 28, 2023
- Genres: Classical music and cabaret
- Occupations: Singer, pianist
- Instruments: Vocals, piano
- Years active: 1964–present
- Labels: Angel Records, DRG, JMM inc.

Larry Woodard (born February 25, 1949) is an American pianist, singer, and cabaret artist.

== Career ==
Larry Woodard is an American pianist, singer, and cabaret artist. He has also worked as a choral conductor, organist, vocal coach, accompanist, and jingle singer for television and radio commercials. Widely known for his mastery of a variety of musical styles and disciplines, Woodard was hailed by the New York Times as, “…a first-rate performer of all musical categories" "…who moves easily between the worlds of classical music and cabaret" "…can slither through “Ain’t Misbehavin’,” move on to an operatic aria, and fall back to a medley of sentimental songs or humorous material" "…an artistic heir of Bobby Short, but with classical leanings.” Woodard has performed at the White House, the Metropolitan Opera House, Carnegie Hall, the New York Philharmonic, the Caramoor Festival, the Bard SummerScape, the 92nd Street Y, the Russian Tea Room, the Algonquin Oak Room, the New York Friars Club, the Morgan Library, the Frick Collection, Gracie Mansion, the official New York City mayoral residence, and other venues.

Larry's Song, a documentary short by Swedish filmmaker Viola Gad and cinematographer K. Suleimanagich, chronicles more than three decades of Woodard's performances at Max and Sissy Strauss' Manhattan salon where he performed as a solo singer/pianist and an impromptu accompanist for opera singers such as Juan Diego Florez, Anna Netrebko, René Pape, Piotr Beczala, Jonas Kaufman, Javier Camarena, and Jerry Hadley – all from memory. Woodard has also collaborated with Dame Kiri te Kanawa, Martina Arroyo, Celeste Holm, Werner Klemperer, Denyce Graves, Dixie Carter, Odetta, Lilias White, Lauren Flanigan, Elly Ameling, Christine Ebersole, KT Sullivan, Vanessa Shaw, Paul Sorvino, Brian Stokes Mitchell, Tamara Tunie, and others.

== Select press ==
The New York Times MUSIC/NOTED IN BRIEF; Music at the Maestro Led by Larry Woodard By John S. Wilson Dec. 31, 1984

The New York Times IN PERFORMANCE; Sneak Attacks Above the Chimney Tops By Stephen Holden March 18, 2003

== Recordings ==
Mr. Woodard recorded a CD of spirituals with opera diva Florence Quivar for Angel/EMI (Decca Record Co.) "Ride On, King Jesus" debuted at number two on Billboard's classical crossover chart, and remained in the top ten for six weeks. Woodard also recorded rare Cherubini arias with tenor Aristotle Panagako for MRF Records. "The Sweetest Sounds of Richard Rodgers" with KT Sullivan for DRG Records won the 2001 "MAC" award for Best Recording by a Duo. In 1991, Woodard was engaged by CAMI Video as Music Consultant for "A Carnegie Hall Christmas Concert," starring Kathleen Battle, Frederica von Stade, Wynton Marsalis, and André Previn. Among Mr. Woodard's recordings is a solo piano/vocal CD produced by JMMinc Records entitled "Lucky to Be Me" (songs by Irving Berlin, Leonard Bernstein, Billy Joel, Billy Strayhorn, and others).

== Awards ==
- 2001 "MAC" award for Best Recording by a Duo, THE SWEETEST SOUNDS OF RICHARD RODGERS with KT Sullivan, Vocals
- 1993 Backstage Magazine BISTRO Award for Outstanding Achievement as a Singer/Instrumentalist

== Discography ==
- 2021 IRVING BERLIN: SWEET AND HOT, various artists | Producer Chip Deffaa's 10th album in a compendium of songs of Irving Berlin | Garrett Mountain Records | Solo Piano/Vocals
- 2003 LUCKY TO BE ME | JMMinc Records | Solo Piano/Vocals
- 2002 WALL TO WALL RICHARD RODGERS, various artists, with KT Sullivan (trk. 3) | Fynsworth Alley (Varèse Sarabande Records) | Piano
- 2000 THE SWEETEST SOUNDS OF RICHARD RODGERS with KT Sullivan, vocals | DRG Records | Piano, Vocals, Arrangements | Winner – 2001 "MAC" Award for Best Recording by a Duo
- 1990 RIDE ON, KING JESUS – Spirituals and Black American Music with Florence Quivar, mezzo-soprano and the Boys Choir of Harlem | EMI/Angel | Piano
- 1976 CHERUBINI: ALI BABA, with Aristotle Panagako, tenor | MRF Records | Piano

== Select television appearances ==
- A&E - BREAKFAST WITH THE ARTS, Elliott Forrest, host, 2006 (piano with bass René Pape)
- CBS – ENTERTAINMENT TONIGHT, Leeza Gibbons & Robb Weller, hosts, 1986 (piano with soprano Kathleen Battle)
- ABC – GOOD MORNING AMERICA, Charles Gibson, host, 1989 (piano with soprano Kathleen Battle)
- NBC - THE JOAN RIVERS SHOW, 1991 (piano with mezzo-soprano Florence Quivar)
- MY9 – THE JOE FRANKLIN SHOW, 1987 (piano/vocal, interviews, as himself)
- CH5 – (WNEW) MIDDAY LIVE with BILL BOGGS, 1983 (interviews as himself)
- NBC - SUNDAY TODAY, Al Roker, host, 1987 (piano with nuns in "Real Live Sister Act")
- NBC - THE TODAY SHOW, Bryant Gumbel, host, 1992 (piano with soprano Kathleen Battle)

== Television specials and documentaries ==
- CABARET THIRTEEN, PBS, Michael Feinstein, host, various artists, 1996 (piano with KT Sullivan, vocals)
- HOLIDAY IN NEW YORK, A&E, Elliott Forrest, host, various artists, 2001 (piano with bass René Pape) | produced by A&E TV Network Special Presentations as the network's response to the terrorist attacks on the World Trade Center on September 11, 2001.
- AN IMPRESARIO IN NEW YORK – HERBERT H. BRESLIN, 1985 (solo piano/vocals, various artists) | Portrait of the classical music agent, publicist, and author of The King and I, about his relationship with his client and friend the tenor Luciano Pavarotti | A production of TWINCOM Productions IAMLYRE Group France Tèlècom FRANCE 3
- LARRY'S SONG, 2014 | Documentary of the cabaret pianist LARRY WOODARD, who has accompanied world-class opera singers at informal private performances. Directed by Swedish filmmaker Viola Gad and cinematographer Kenny Suleimanagich.
- THE LAST SALON: SISSY STRAUSS, NEW YORK – VIENNA, 2016, 52 mim | Full-length documentary film by Joachim Dennhardt | Winner, Hollywood International Independent Documentary Award for Best International Documentary Film (piano, vocals, interviews)
- NEW YORK IN SONG, 2002, Kitty Carlisle Hart, host | produced for CUNY TV by Howard Weinberg and Ruth Leon | various artists performing to benefit victims of the 9/11 attacks on the World Trade Center
- ROCKEFELLER CENTER CHRISTMAS TREE LIGHTING CEREMONY, NBC, 1991, Lucy Arnaz, host (piano with soprano Kathleen Battle)
