= Birgitta Svendén =

Swedish operatic mezzo-soprano

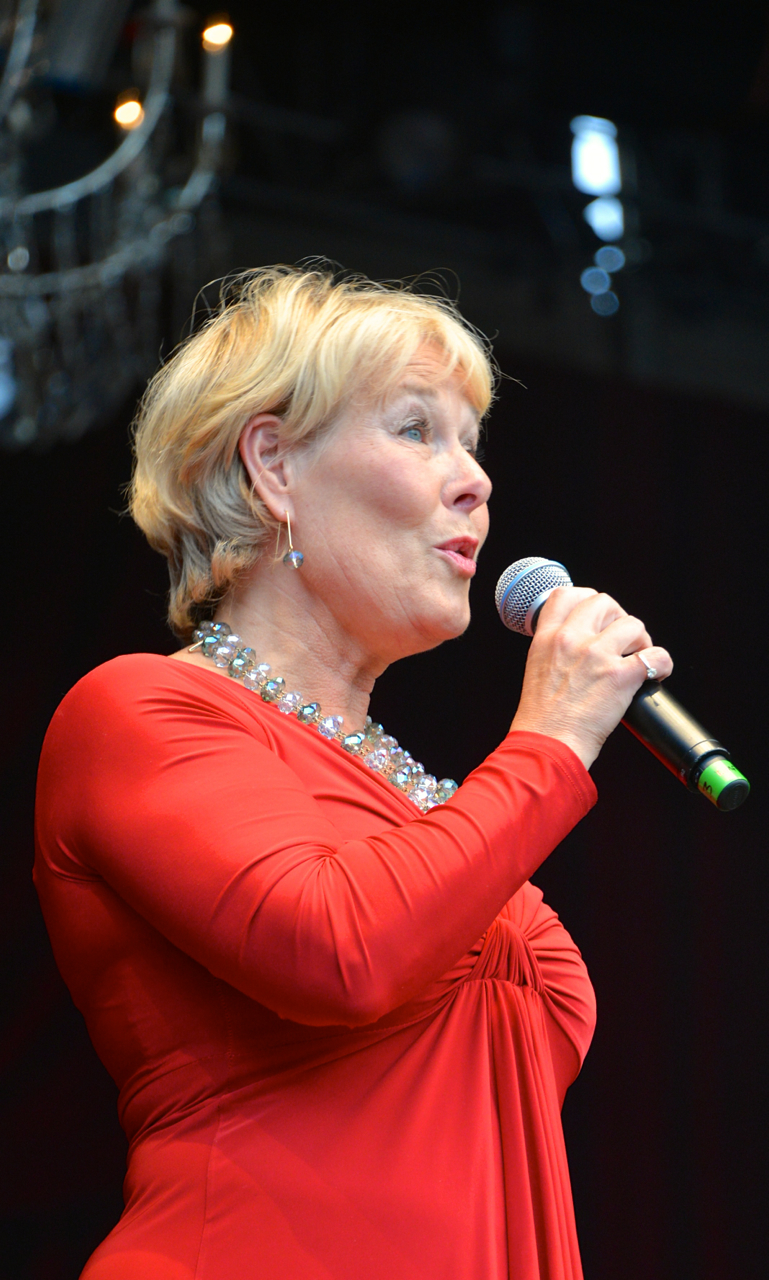
- Birgitta Svendén in 2013
- Born: 20 March 1952 (age 74); Porjus, Sweden
- Education: Operahögskolan, Stockholm
- Occupation: Singer

Birgitta Svendén (née Lundberg, 20 March 1952), is a Swedish operatic mezzo-soprano.

Svendén was born in Porjus and then raised in Vuollerim. She studied at Operahögskolan in Stockholm, and later embarked on an international career in the first place as a Wagner singer, especially at the Bayreuth Festival where she sang several performances between 1983 and 1999, many of those as Erda. She was also a frequent guest at the Metropolitan Opera in New York between 1988 and 2000. Her artistic base remained at the Royal Swedish Opera where she was contracted from 1981 to 2004.

Birgitta Svendén was appointed hovsångerska in 1995. She is also a full member of the Academy of Music and an honorary doctor at the Lulea University of Technology. From 1 August 2005 to 2009, she was the rector of the Opera School in Stockholm. Since 1 February 2010, she has been General Manager of the Royal Swedish Opera.

== Recordings ==
The Flying Dutchman (1994), conducted by James Levine with Metropolitan Opera orchestra and chorus. Cast included James Morris, Deborah Voigt, Jan-Hendrik Rootering, Ben Heppner, Paul Groves, and Birgitta Svendén. She also sang Erda in Das Rheingold and Siegfried in the Met Opera Ring Cycle CDs and DVDs recorded between 1987 and 1991 conducted by Levine with Morris, Behrens, Wlaschiha, Goldberg (Siegfried CD), Jerusalem (Siegfried DVD) and Ludwig.

== Videography ==
- The Metropolitan Opera Gala 1991, Deutsche Grammophon DVD, 00440-073-4582
