= Martin Wright (conductor) =

American conductor

Martin Wright was born in 1955 in Murtaugh, Idaho. He graduated from Brigham Young University in 1980 with a bachelor's degree in Music Performance, following which he earned his Master of Music degree in 1981 from the University of Arizona.

Wright has served as chorus master of San Diego Opera (1984–97), chief conductor of the Netherlands Radio Choir (1993–2002), music director of the San Diego Master Chorale (2002–06), principal guest conductor of Lyric Opera San Diego (2000–2006) and artistic director of the chorus of The Netherlands Opera from 2006 to 2011. In 2011, Wright was chosen as chorus master of the Lyric Opera of Chicago but ill health forced him to resign that post in November 2012. Since 2015, he has been chorus master of the Berlin State Opera.

His teaching career includes positions at the Wolf Trap Center for the Performing Arts (1983), Music Academy of the West (1989), University of Arizona (1908–1981), and Brigham Young University (1973–1980).
