= Leo Nucci =

Italian opera singer

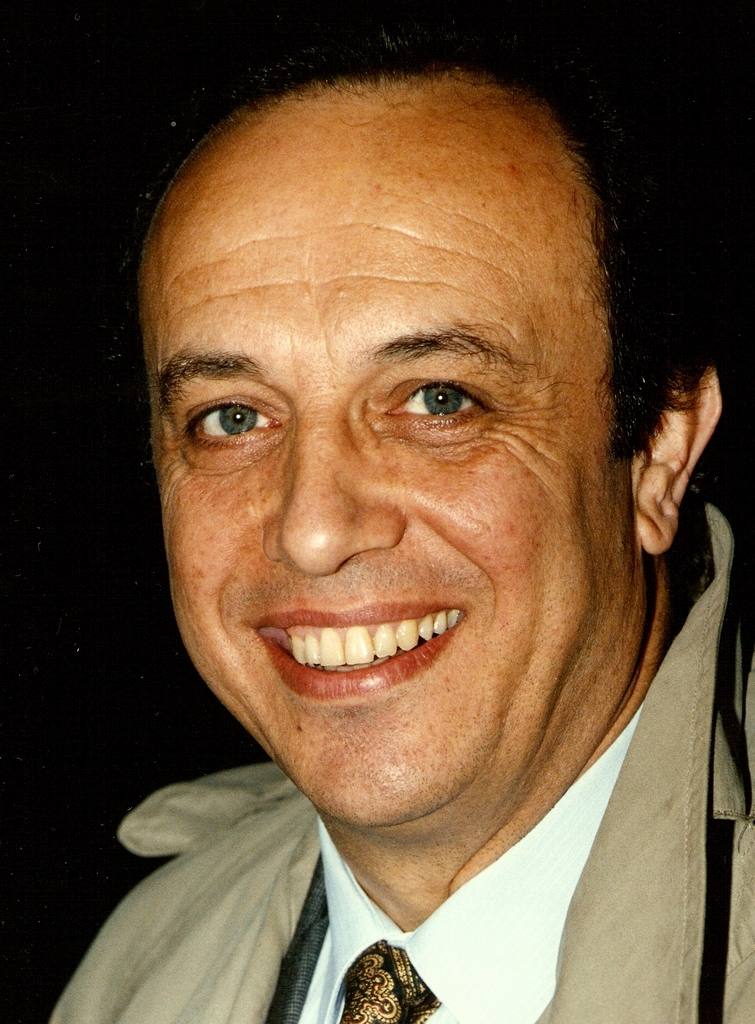
- Leo Nucci
- Born: 16 April 1942 (age 84); Castiglione dei Pepoli, Province of Bologna
- Citizenship: Italy
- Occupation: Baritone
- Years active: 1967–present
- Notable work: Verdi and Verismo roles
- Spouse: Adriana Anelli
- Children: 1
- Website: Official website

Leo Nucci (born 16 April 1942) is an Italian operatic baritone, particularly associated with Verdi and Verismo roles.

== Biography ==
Born at Castiglione dei Pepoli, near Bologna, Nucci studied with Giuseppe Marchese. He made his stage debut in 1967 in Spoleto as Figaro in Il barbiere di Siviglia. He then joined the chorus of La Scala in Milan, going on to make his solo debut there in 1975, as Rossini's Figaro.

Nucci's career quickly took an international turn. He debuted at London's Royal Opera House in 1978, as Miller in Luisa Miller, and at New York's Metropolitan Opera in 1980, as Renato/Ankarström in Un ballo in maschera. Renato was his debut role at the Paris Opéra in 1981, and at the Salzburg Festival in 1989, under Herbert Von Karajan. His career is remembered for high-profile performances in opera including appearances with Luciano Pavarotti, Joan Sutherland and Plácido Domingo.

Nucci sings "Plebe, patrici" from Simon Boccanegra at the Liceu, 2015.

On 6 June 2003, Nucci performed at the Herbert von Karajan memorial concert under the baton of conductor James Allen Gähres in Congress-Centrum Ulm, together with the singers Stella Grigorian and Vera Schoenberg with Italian opera arias and duets.

In January 2016, he performed at La Scala of Milan as Rigoletto in Rigoletto with Nadine Sierra as Gilda.

On 10 October 2019, Nucci sang during the celebrations for the anniversary of Giuseppe Verdi, in Parma.

Nucci has enjoyed a long and successful career. His repertoire encompasses the entire Italian repertory from bel canto to verismo, and his technique and acting abilities are displayed in Verdi – notably as Rigoletto, Macbeth, Count di Luna, Giorgio Germont, Rodrigo, Amonasro, Iago, and Falstaff and Miller. He has sung the role of Rigoletto alone more than 500 times.

Leo Nucci performed Rigoletto, aged 84 in Xiamen, China in the Fujan Province in May 2026.

=== Personal life ===
He is married to soprano Adriana Anelli, with whom he has a daughter.

== Videography ==
- The Metropolitan Opera Gala 1991, Deutsche Grammophon DVD, 00440-073-4582

== Sources ==
- Grove Music Online, Elizabeth Forbes, May 2008
