= Aprile Millo =

American opera singer

Aprile Millo (born April 14, 1958) is an American operatic soprano who is known for her interpretations of the works of Giuseppe Verdi. Although she has performed at many of the world's leading opera houses and with many orchestras and ensembles internationally, Millo has spent much of her career appearing in productions at the Metropolitan Opera.

== Background and early career ==
Aprile Millo was born in New York City, the daughter of two opera singers, tenor Giovanni Millo (John Hamill) and soprano Margherita Girosi. Millo became interested in music at an early age and received her musical education primarily from her parents. She is also the sister of lead singer, Rick Wilder and older sister to singer-songwriter, Grace Millo.

After graduating from Hollywood High School in Los Angeles in 1976 she was invited to join the San Diego Opera Center as an apprentice, where she took part in the inaugural program and where as a member she sang the High Priestess in Aida. In several European trips she won several singing competitions including first prize in the Concorso Internazionale di Voci Verdiane in Busseto, Italy (1978), the Montserrat Caballé Bernabé Martí Special Verdi Prize Award in Barcelona (1979), and the Geraldine Farrar Award (1980).

After leaving the San Diego Opera, Millo sang her first major role, the title role of Verdi's Aida, with Utah Opera in January 1980. She returned to Utah Opera in early 1981 to perform the role of Santuzza in Mascagni's Cavalleria rusticana. Millo moved back to New York City and auditioned for the New York City Opera where her father had sung from 1942 until 1946, and she was offered a contract with several roles. The Metropolitan Opera also offered the 22-year old to become a member of the Met's Young Artist Program, as well as to cover leading roles. While in the Met's program she worked with Dick Marzollo and then only with David Stivender and Rita Patanè. She also had the opportunity to work with Elisabeth Schwarzkopf who took her to Herbert von Karajan, and with mentors Renata Tebaldi, Zinka Milanov and Licia Albanese.

In November 1982, Millo made her European debut as Aida at the Badisches Staatstheater Karlsruhe in Karlsruhe, Germany, and in December at La Scala as Elvira in Ernani when she replaced soprano Mirella Freni who had taken ill. In January 1983 she had performances of Ernani at La Scala of her own. She made her New York debut with Eve Queler and the Opera Orchestra of New York in November 1984, singing Matilde in Rossini's Guillaume Tell.

On December 3, 1984, Millo made her Metropolitan Opera debut replacing an ailing soprano as Amelia in Verdi's Simon Boccanegra with James Levine on the podium. The critics praised Millo's performance with The New York Times proclaiming that her voice had "a breadth and a shining ring that would have won her a midscene ovation in any Italian opera house". Shortly thereafter Millo won two major awards for classical singers: the Richard Tucker Award (1985) and the Maria Callas Foundation Award (1986).

== Career highlights ==
In 1986 Millo made her Carnegie Hall debut with Verdi's I Lombardi alla prima crociata with tenor Carlo Bergonzi and Eve Queler and the Opera Orchestra of New York. At the Metropolitan Opera she has sung over 160 performances of 14 different roles, including Leonora in Il trovatore, Aida, Tosca, Amelia in Simon Boccanegra, and Amelia in Un ballo in maschera.

Millo's debut recording in 1986 was Presenting Aprile Millo with the London Symphony and Giuseppe Patanè. She has recorded several Verdi operas with James Levine and the Metropolitan Opera for Sony Classical, including Aida, Il trovatore , Luisa Miller, and Don Carlo. In 1989, she opened the Metropolitan Opera season starring as Aida opposite Plácido Domingo. The performance was recorded live for telecast and DVD release, which won an Emmy. Her 1991 performance of Un ballo in maschera with Luciano Pavarotti was released on CD and DVD. Millo toured with the Metropolitan Opera to Japan in 1988 and 1993, returning in 1989, 1990 and 1991 for solo recitals.

Millo debuted with the Lyric Opera of Chicago in 1991 as Margherita in Boito's Mefistofele. The following year she debuted with the Bavarian State Opera as Leonora in La forza del destino and with the San Francisco Opera as Maddalena de Coigny in Andrea Chénier. She appeared as Giselda for the Metropolitan Opera's first-ever performance of Verdi's I Lombardi, again with Pavarotti and Levine, in late 1993.

A car accident in Turin briefly sidelined Millo and forced her to cancel Caterina Cornaro in New York; she returned to the stage of the Metropolitan Opera in 1995 and 1996, playing Amelia (Simon Boccanegra) and Desdemona (Otello), opposite Plácido Domingo. That same year, she performed Maddalena in Andrea Chénier with Luciano Pavarotti in his debut in the title role. She reprised the role of Maddalena in 2002, with Domingo; and in 2007, with Ben Heppner. In October 1993 Millo made a debut in the role of Imogene of Il pirata by Vincenzo Bellini at ABAO Bilbao, along Bruno Praticó as Ernesto and Ramón Vargas in the part of Gualtiero.

In 1997, Millo sang her first Tosca at the Liceu, Barcelona, with Giacomo Aragall and Juan Pons, followed by performances of the opera at La Scala and at the Met. Other Metropolitan Opera performances include Mefistofele (1999–2000) and Gioconda in La Gioconda (2006). Millo has also performed several roles with the Opera Orchestra of New York: Il Lombardi of Verdi (1986) with Carlo Bergonzi, Maddalena in Andrea Chenier, the title roles of Wally in Catalani's La Wally (1990), La battaglia di Legnano (1987) Adriana Lecouvreur (2004), La Gioconda (2005), and Minnie in La fanciulla del West (2005). In 2005, Millo also appeared for Teatro Grattacielo in the verismo opera Zazà.

Millo returned to the stage in her debut of Puccini's Il tabarro as Giorgetta in Genoa at the Teatro Carlo Felice in 2014. After an absence of ten years from the stage in New York, New York City Opera presented Millo in a 2019 recital in Carnegie Hall.

== Critical reception ==
On April 4, 1986, Donal Henahan wrote in The New York Times of Millo's performance in Don Carlo: "Miss Millo sounds more and more like the Verdi soprano we've been waiting for."

== Videography ==
- The Metropolitan Opera Gala 1991, Deutsche Grammophon DVD, 00440-073-4582
- James Levine's 25th Anniversary Metropolitan Opera Gala (1996), Deutsche Grammophon DVD, B0004602-09

== Sources ==
- Cori Ellison: "Aprile Millo", Grove Music Online ed. L. Macy (Accessed October 19, 2008), (subscription access)
- Warrack, John, and West, Ewan (1992), The Oxford Dictionary of Opera, 782 pages, ISBN 0-19-869164-5
