= Charles Anthony (tenor) =

American tenor

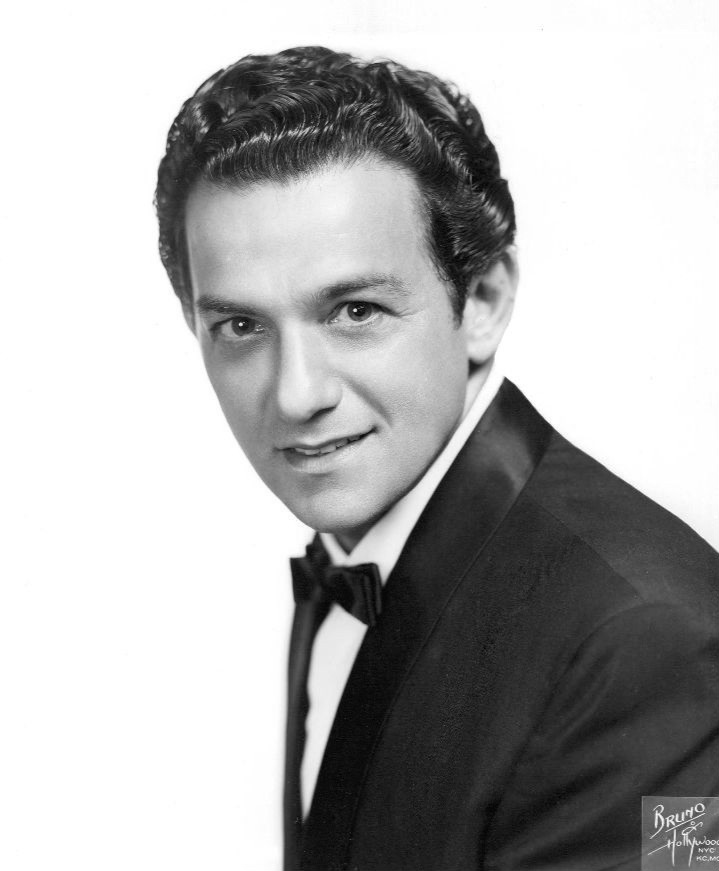
Anthony in 1974.

Charles Anthony Caruso (né Calogero Antonio Caruso; July 15, 1929 – February 15, 2012), better known by his stage name of Charles Anthony, was an American actor and tenor noted for his portrayal of comprimario characters in opera. Anthony had the distinction of appearing in more performances at the Metropolitan Opera than any other performer. He celebrated his fiftieth anniversary with the company in 2004, and gave his farewell in the role of the aged Emperor Altoum in Turandot, at the Met, on January 28, 2010.

== Early years ==
Anthony was born in New Orleans, Louisiana, the child of immigrants from Sicily. He studied music at Loyola University New Orleans, where he studied under Dorothy Hulse, also the teacher of Audrey Schuh and Harry Theyard; he graduated in 1951. The tenor sang the role of the Messenger in Il trovatore at the New Orleans Opera Association in 1947. At the age of twenty-two, he auditioned under his birth name for the Metropolitan Opera's Auditions of the Air. He won the auditions, but Sir Rudolf Bing convinced him to drop his surname, saying that it would invite comparisons with Enrico Caruso.

== At the Metropolitan ==
Anthony made his debut at the Metropolitan on March 6, 1954, playing the role of the Simpleton in Boris Godunov, which was sung in English. Critics were impressed; The New York Times wrote, "Mr. Anthony had better be careful. If he does other bit parts so vividly, he'll be stamped as a character singer for life." This proved prescient; although Anthony performed some larger roles early in his career (including Don Ottavio, to the Donna Anna of Herva Nelli, in Don Giovanni), he made his mark as a comprimario singer. Tenor Franco Corelli insisted on Anthony singing Tybalt opposite his Roméo after another singer actually wounded him.

On February 17, 1992, following Act II of a performance of Puccini's Tosca, Anthony was honored in an onstage ceremony on the occasion of his breaking the record of George Cehanovsky for most appearances by an artist at the Metropolitan Opera. By the time of his retirement, Anthony had performed 2,928 times with the company, over fifty-six seasons. He was also an honorary member of International Alliance of Theatrical Stage Employees Local One in New York City. Following his retirement from the Metropolitan Opera, he lived in Tampa, Florida, where he died at his home from kidney failure at the age of 82.

== On television ==
Anthony was included in many of the Met's telecasts, including Otello (conducted by James Levine, 1979), Elektra (with Birgit Nilsson, 1980), Un ballo in maschera (with Katia Ricciarelli, 1980), Il trittico (with Renata Scotto, 1981), Rigoletto (with Louis Quilico in the title role, 1981), Der Rosenkavalier (with Dame Kiri Te Kanawa, 1982), Idomeneo (produced by Jean-Pierre Ponnelle, 1982), Tannhäuser (with Richard Cassilly, 1982), Don Carlos (opposite Plácido Domingo and Mirella Freni, 1983), Ernani (with Luciano Pavarotti in the name part, 1983), Lohengrin (with Peter Hofmann, 1986), Dialogues des Carmélites (directed by John Dexter, 1987), Ariadne auf Naxos (with Jessye Norman, 1988), Il barbiere di Siviglia (1988), Un ballo in maschera (staged by Piero Faggioni, 1991), La fanciulla del West (1992), Stiffelio (1993), Il tabarro (with Teresa Stratas, 1994), Simon Boccanegra (1995), Otello (1995), Die Meistersinger (2001), Fedora (1997), Samson et Dalila (1998), and, finally, Turandot (with Maria Guleghina, 2009).

Early in his career, he appeared on live network television for CBS in an adaptation of Hector Berlioz' sacred oratorio L'enfance du Christ (1964) under the musical direction of Alfredo Antonini (with Sherrill Milnes, Giorgio Tozzi and Ara Berberian).

== Studio recordings ==
In 1956 and 1957, the tenor recorded excerpts from Les contes d'Hoffmann, Pagliacci, La périchole (with Patrice Munsel and Theodor Uppman), and Don Pasquale (with Salvatore Baccaloni) for the Metropolitan Opera Record Club.

In 1982, Anthony recorded Gastone, in La traviata (which he had sung opposite Maria Callas, in 1958), with Levine leading Stratas, Domingo, and Cornell MacNeil. In 1990, he recorded the role of the Messenger, in Aïda, conducted by Levine.

== Videography ==
- Mozart: Idomeneo (1982), Deutsche Grammophon DVD, 00440-073-4234
- The Metropolitan Opera Gala 1991, Deutsche Grammophon DVD, 00440-073-4582
- James Levine's 25th Anniversary Metropolitan Opera Gala (1996), Deutsche Grammophon DVD, B0004602-09

== Death ==
Anthony died on February 15, 2012, in Tampa, Florida, from kidney failure, aged 82.
