= Barbara Daniels (soprano) =

American opera singer

- Born: May 7, 1946 (age 79); Newark, Ohio, U.S.
- Education: University of Cincinnati – College-Conservatory of Music
- Occupation: Operatic soprano
- Organizations: Staatstheater Kassel; Cologne Opera; Metropolitan Opera

Barbara Daniels (born May 7, 1946) is an American operatic soprano.

Born in Newark, Ohio, Daniels studied music at the University of Cincinnati – College-Conservatory of Music; among her roles there was Diana in the American premiere of Francesco Cavalli's La Calisto in April 1972, to the Giove of Tom Fox. Her professional debut came the following year with West Palm Beach Opera, where she sang Susanna in Mozart's The Marriage of Figaro. From 1974 until 1976 she was on the roster of the Tyrolean State Theatre, singing such roles with the company as Fiordiligi in Mozart's Così fan tutte and the title role of Verdi's La traviata. From 1976 to 1978 she was a member of the Staatstheater Kassel, where her repertory grew to incorporate such roles as Liù in Puccini's Turandot, the title role in Massenet's Manon, and Zdenka in Arabella by Richard Strauss; she also participated in performances of Unter dem Milchwald by Walter Steffens. In 1978 she moved to the Cologne Opera, where she would remain until 1982; her roles there included the title role in Flotow's Martha, Micaëla in Bizet's Carmen, Musetta in Puccini's La bohème, and Alice Ford in Verdi's Falstaff. It was during this time that she made debuts at the Royal Opera House (1978, as Rosalinde in Die Fledermaus by Johann Strauss) and San Francisco Opera (1980, as Zdenka). Her Metropolitan Opera debut, as Musetta, followed in 1983; she would go on to perform at the Metropolitan 119 times.

In earlier years, Daniels possessed a lyric voice, and her repertory encompassed such parts as Adèle in Rossini's Le comte Ory, the title roles in Handel's Agrippina and Puccini's Madama Butterfly, Mimì in La bohème, the title role in Smetana's The Bartered Bride, and Marguerite in Gounod's Faust. Later in her career her voice became more powerful and dramatic; in 1991 she performed Minnie in Puccini's La fanciulla del West at the Metropolitan Opera, a role which has come to be seen as her finest portrayal, and she added the title roles in Puccini's Tosca and Manon Lescaut, and the Marschallin in Der Rosenkavalier by Richard Strauss to her repertoire. She continued her career into the 1990s with roles such as Nedda in Leoncavallo's I pagliacci and Senta in Wagner's Der fliegende Holländer. She has also worked as a voice teacher, living in Innsbruck.
