= Helen Boatwright =

American opera singer (1916–2010)

- Born: Helena Johanna Strassburger; November 17, 1916; Sheboygan, Wisconsin
- Died: December 1, 2010 (aged 94); Jamesville, New York
- Education: Mission House College; Oberlin College
- Occupations: Soprano; voice teacher
- Known for: Recordings and performances of Charles Ives's songs
- Spouse: Howard Boatwright (m. 1943; died 1999)
- Children: 3

Helen Boatwright (born Helena Johanna Strassburger, November 17, 1916 – December 1, 2010) was an American soprano and voice teacher. A native of Wisconsin, she was educated at Mission House College and Oberlin College. While she occasionally performed in operas, she was primarily active as a recitalist and in oratorios among other concert literature. She began performing in public concerts as an amateur while a teenager in the 1930s and moved into professional work in the 1940s. She continued to sing professionally into her 90s and was still performing publicly as late as 2009. While her repertoire was wide she was particularly known for her performances of American songs; often championing new music. She recorded the first full-length album of songs by composer Charles Ives, and was celebrated for her performances of his music.

Boatwright was the wife of violinist and composer Howard Boatwright with whom she frequently performed. Both she and her husband taught on the music faculty at Syracuse University, and together co-founded a summer music school in Switzerland, L'École Hindemith, that they ran from 1969 to 1988. Boatwright was also a professor of voice at Connecticut College, the Eastman School of Music, and the Peabody Institute during her career.

== Early life ==
The daughter of Gustave and Amalie Strassburger, Helena Johanna Strassburger was born in Sheboygan, Wisconsin on November 17, 1916. She was the youngest of six children in a large German American family. Her father was the owner of the Northfield Furniture Company in Sheboygan and contributed to the city's reputation as "Chair City". The family were all gifted amateur singers, and would sing Bach chorales in four-part harmony nightly while at the dinner table. Her sister Esther, later known as Mrs. Ner Friedley, became supervisor of elementary school music for the public school system in Sheboygan.

As a child, Helen attended Grant School for her primary and middle school education in the Sheboygan Area School District. At a young age she gained the nickname "Tommy" because she was very fond of the nursery rhyme "Little Tommy Tucker". The nickname stuck and she was affectionately called Tommy by Sheboygan residents into her adulthood. At Grant she sang soprano in the school's choir under the direction of Lydia Knocke.

She attended Sheboygan Central High School (SCHS, then called Sheboygan High School), and by 1931 was singing solos at school choral concerts under conductor G. F. Schlei. That same year she sang on the WHBL radio program Melody Hour, and sang as a member of the newly formed Sheboygan Civic Chorus which was led by Madame Rosemary Rose. With this choir she performed solos in Haydn's The Creation in 1932.

In addition to performing in school concerts, Boatwright was also active as a performer in school plays at SCHS that were directed by Lorna Seabury. She was also a member of the choir at First Congregational Church in Sheboygan while in high school. Her senior year at SCHS she sang in the school's vocal quartet, and continued to perform in choral concerts, now under the direction of Levi Dees. She graduated from SCHS in June 1933. That same month she performed her first recital; performing with several other voice students who all studied with Anna S. Imig. 60 years later she sang at her high school class reunion.

== College education and marriage ==
Helen attended Mission House College (MHC, later named Lakeland University) in the 1933-1934 academic year, and the 1934-1935 academic year. She continued to study singing with Imig during this period. Nearly 50 years later she was honored by Lakeland University with the Silver Bowl for outstanding professional achievement in 1982. In November 1933 she performed the role of The Dew Fairy in an amateur production of the opera Hansel and Gretel; years later singing this same part in the film Hansel and Gretel: An Opera Fantasy (1954). In May 1934 she portrayed Cecily in MHC's production of Oscar Wilde's The Importance of Being Earnest. In May 1935 she portrayed Jessica Vanderpool in MHC's production of the operetta Miss Cherry Blossom.

In 1936 she was awarded a vocal music scholarship to attend Oberlin College (OC) in Ohio. At OC she sang as both a soloist and ensemble member in the women's glee club directed by John E. Wirkler. She starred in the title role of OC's 1937 production of Gilbert and Sullivan's Patience which was directed by OC professors William Kilgore Breckenridge and James Stanton McLaughlin. The following year she starred in OC's production of Iolanthe. She graduated with a Bachelor of Music degree from OC in 1939.

In the Summer of 1939 she did postgraduate courses at Syracuse University, and then began working as a music teacher in Ohio. She taught music at Andrews School for Girls in Willoughby, Ohio. She continued graduate studies at OC in the summer months when not teaching, and also worked as a graduate assistant at OC. At OC she studied with composer Normand Lockwood who instilled in her a philosophy that singers had a responsibility to perform and promote contemporary music. She graduated from OC with Master of Music degree on June 2, 1943.

Helen's mother died in the summer of 1942. She met her future husband, violinist and composer Howard Boatwright, in Los Angeles in 1941 when they were to perform in a National Federation of Music Clubs competition. They married two years later, on June 13, 1943, in St. Louis, Missouri. Prior to their marriage, Howard set several poems to music for Helen to sing; the first compositions he ever created. Years later Helen sang these songs for their first public hearing in a 1998 recital at the Everson Museum of Art (EMA) in honor of their 55th wedding anniversary. She had earlier performed the world premiere of "It is the Form That Passes, Not the Man" at the EMA in 2000; a work composed for her by her former teacher, Norman Lockwood, when he was 93 years old.

== Early career and life in Texas ==
In January 1940 Boatwright was a soloist in a concert with the Cleveland Women's Orchestra. In the early 1940s she worked on the music staff of Plymouth Church of Shaker Heights as their resident soprano. In 1942 she studied under Boris Goldovsky in the opera program at the Berkshire Music Center. On July 27, 1942 she sang at the Tanglewood Music Festival as part of this pre-professional opera group in excerpts from operas with Leonard Bernstein conducting. Her portion of the program was singing Clara's aria "Summertime" from Porgy and Bess.

Boatwright made her opera debut at Tanglewood that same summer as Anna in Otto Nicolai's The Merry Wives of Windsor. Her fellow cast members at these opera appearances at Tanglewood included soprano Irma González, bass-baritone James Pease, and tenor Mario Lanza. Lanza played her love interest, Fenton, in the opera by Nicolai. In March 1943 she was a soloist in Bach's St Matthew Passion with the Arion Musical Club at the Milwaukee Auditorium.

Immediately following her marriage in 1943 she moved to Austin, Texas where her husband was working as a music professor at the University of Texas at Austin (UTA). In Austin she directed the youth choir at First United Methodist Church of Austin, and sang in UTA opera productions and in UTA's chorus in addition to performing at other community events. Her husband was her frequent music collaborator throughout her career. They often appeared in concerts and recitals together, and her husband created several songs specifically for her.

Boatwright sang in multiple productions with the San Antonio Civic Opera from 1943 to 1945; including portraying Barbara Frietchie in Sigmund Romberg's My Maryland (1944) and Gretel in Humperdinck's Hansel and Gretel (1944). In March 1944 she was the soprano soloist in Handel's Messiah at the Hogg Memorial Auditorium in Austin with Archie Jones leading the musical forces. That same year she gave a concert tour with her husband to Mexico which included performances together at the Palacio de Bellas Artes.

== Move to Connecticut and mid-career performances ==
In 1945 Boatwright relocated with her husband to New Haven, Connecticut when he was made a Fellow at the Yale School of Music. The couple had three children, Howard Leake III (known as Lea), David Alexander, and Alice, who were born in the years between 1946 and 1952. Her husband taught on the faculty of YSM from 1952 to 1960, and was concurrently concertmaster of the New Haven Symphony Orchestra (1950-1962) and music director at St. Thomas's Episcopal Church (1949-1964). Helen assisted her husband at St. Thomas to the point that some publications named her a co-leader of the music at the church.

Soon after moving to New Haven, Boatwright began performing regularly in concerts of medieval music led by Paul Hindemith with Yale’s Collegium Musicum. In 1946 she was the soprano soloist in Bach's Christmas Oratorio in separate concerts with the Virginia Choral Society (then Peninsula Choral Society) and the Bach Choir of Bethlehem. With the latter choir she was also a soloist in the Mass in B minor at their annual May Bach Festival in 1946. That same year she was featured singing on the radio program Your Hit Parade. In 1947 she was a soloist in Gabriel Pierné's oratorio La Croisade des Enfants with the Ottawa Choral Union and the Ottawa Symphony Orchestra at the Ottawa Auditorium.

In 1948 Boatwright was a soloist in Bach's Peasant Cantata with the Cambridge Collegium Musicum. In 1949 she was appointed to the summer music faculty at the University of Wisconsin. In 1954, she became the first person to record a full-length album of Charles Ives' songs, 24 Songs, with pianist John Kirkpatrick. In 1955 she was appointed to the music faculty of Connecticut College. In 1958 she was a soloist in Haydn's The Creation with the Cleveland Orchestra conducted by Robert Shaw and fellow soloists Adele Addison, Blake Stern, and Donald Gramm. That same year a recording of her singing music by Dieterich Buxtehude with Alfred Mann and The Cantata Singers of New York was released by Urania Records.

In 1959 Boatwright traveled with her husband and children to Bombay, India where her husband spent the 1959-1960 academic year both teaching and studying under the auspices of the Bharatiya Vidya Bhavan after being made a Fulbright Scholar. Helen performed in concerts with her husband while in India, and on their travels back to the United States they stopped over in Germany to give a series of concerts sponsored by the United States Department of State. In the summer of 1962 she toured Europe as a soloist with the Massachusetts Institute of Technology Choral Society in performances of Mozart's Great Mass in C minor, K. 427 in many cities. She later sang this work with Paul Boepple and the Dessoff Choirs at Carnegie Hall in 1968.

On April 30, 1963 she performed with Basil Rathbone and the Consort Players in the East Room of the White House for the state dinner given for Charlotte, Grand Duchess of Luxembourg given by American president John F. Kennedy and First Lady Jackie Kennedy. The following month she gave a recital of contemporary American music with pianist William Dale at the National Gallery of Art. In the summer of 1964 she returned to the Tanglewood Music Festival to sing four concerts as a soloist with the Boston Symphony Orchestra under conductor Erich Leinsdorf; including a performance of Mendelssohn's A Midsummer Night's Dream. The following November she portrayed Nicaule, Queen of Sheba, in Handel's Solomon with conductor Johannes Somary and the Amor Artis Chorale at The Town Hall.

In 1965 Boatwright was a soloist alongside Betty Allen in Mahler's Symphony No. 2 with the American Symphony Orchestra conducted by Leopold Stokowski. She later performed in this same work with the Baltimore Symphony Orchestra and conductor Sergiu Comissiona in 1969. In the summer of 1965 she performed at the Peninsula Music Festival in Sister Bay, Wisconsin as a soloist in Stravinsky's ballet Pulcinella and as Lia in Debussy's opera L'enfant prodigue.

On Christmas Eve 1965 Boatwright was the featured soprano soloist in a televised broadcast of Handel's Messiah with the Handel and Haydn Society. She was again a soloist in that oratorio the following year in separate performances with the Milwaukee Symphony Orchestra and the Bel Canto Chorus under the baton of Harry John Brown and the Los Angeles Philharmonic and Los Angeles Master Chorale under Zubin Mehta.

In 1967 she made her New York recital debut at The Town Hall in which she performed Paul Hindemith's song cycle Das Marienleben with pianist Paul Ulanowsky. Raymond Ericson wrote the following in his review:

"[Boatwright] sang the cycle as she has other music, with a total submersion of her own personality in the work. She has a voice of rare purity, and she sings phrases with comparable clarity and firm outline."

In the Spring of 1967 Boatwright performed with the Philadelphia Orchestra and the Mormon Tabernacle Choir on tour to the Saratoga Performing Arts Center in performances of both Brahms's A German Requiem and Handel's Messiah with conductor Eugene Ormandy. The following summer she returned to Tanglewood to perform with mezzo Beverly Wolff and the Boston Symphony Orchestra in Bach's Mass in B minor under Leinsdorf's baton. In 1968 she performed Arnold Schönberg's Erwartung with the Chicago Symphony Orchestra led by Irwin Hoffman. In 1969 she performed the Brahms Requiem again; this time with the Toronto Symphony led by Seiji Ozawa at Massey Hall.

== Later career ==
From 1964 to 1971, Boatwright's husband Howard was dean of the School of Music at Syracuse University (SU) and she joined him teaching there. When they left New Haven to work at SU they moved into an old farm house in Fayetteville, New York. Helen was a professor of voice at first the Eastman School of Music at the University of Rochester from 1972 to 1979, and later at the Peabody Conservatory at Johns Hopkins University in Baltimore from 1987 to 1989. She was also a guest professor at Cornell University. She also gave master-classes at Elon College (1970), University of North Carolina (1989), Washington University in St. Louis (1989), University of Massachusetts Amherst (1991), Smith College (1999), and the New England Conservatory (2005). One of her students was soprano Eileen Strempel.

In 1968 the Boatwrights toured Switzerland during which time they visited Paul Hindemith's grave in Blonay - Saint-Légier. They were inspired to found a summer music school in Switzerland, L'École Hindemith, which held its first session in the summer of 1969 under the sponsorship of Syracuse University. The couple continued to operate and teach at this summer music school for the next two decades; holding the final summer session in 1988. In 1989 Boatwright and her husband directed a summer program at the Seagle Music Colony in Schroon Lake, New York.

In 1970 Boatwright reunited with the Bach Choir of Bethlehem and conductor Alfred Mann to sing again in the Mass in B minor. In 1971 she was a soloist in Bach's St John Passion with member of the New York Philharmonic, the Westminster Choir, and conductor Meredith Davies at Philharmonic Hall, New York which used a new version of the oratorio edited by Benjamin Britten. That same year she performed with the orchestra of the Handel and Haydn Society at Alice Tully Hall with conductor Klaus Liepmann and combined choruses from M.I.T. and Rutgers University in Haydn's The Seasons. In 1974 she performed the world premiere of Francis Thorne's song cycle Songs of the Great South Bay at Avery Fisher Hall with pianst Yehudi Wyner. In 1976 she sang a concert of Renaissance and Baroque music with lutenist Paul O'Dette at Carnegie Hall.

In the late 1970s and early 1980s Boatwright gave several concerts of the music from the Spanisches Liederbuch and Italienisches Liederbuch by Hugo Wolf with baritone Alan Titus. In 1979 she and her husband gave a recital of music for violin and soprano at Carnegie Hall. In 1981 they performed the world premiere of Howard Boatwright's "Ode for St Cecilia's Day" at the Northern Wisconsin Baroque Music Festival which was given in a pairing with Henry Purcell's "Ode for St Cecilia's Day" with both old and new music using the same text by 17th century poet John Dryden.

Boatwright's husband died in 1999. In 2003, Syracuse University presented her with an honorary doctor of music degree. Boatwright continued to study music and teach, and in 2006, she celebrated her 90th birthday with a standing-room only concert at St. David's Episcopal Church in DeWitt, New York. In 2004 she returned to the city of her birth to sing a program of music by Charles Ives with the Sheboygan Symphony Orchestra. She continued to sing publicly into her 90s. In 2009 she was a soloist in Camille Saint-Saëns's Oratorio de Noël at St. David's Episcopal Church in Syracuse.

== Death ==
Boatwright died on December 1, 2010, aged 94, in Jamesville, New York. Her achievements were honored during the 2011 Grammy Awards.
