= Cornelius L. Reid =

American vocal pedagogue

The Modern Singing Master: Cornelius L. Reid, 2002

Cornelius Lawrence Reid (Jersey City, NJ, February 7, 1911 - New York City, NY, February 3, 2008), was a well-known vocal pedagogue in New York City, specialist in the bel canto technique, and author of books on bel canto.

== Life ==
Childhood

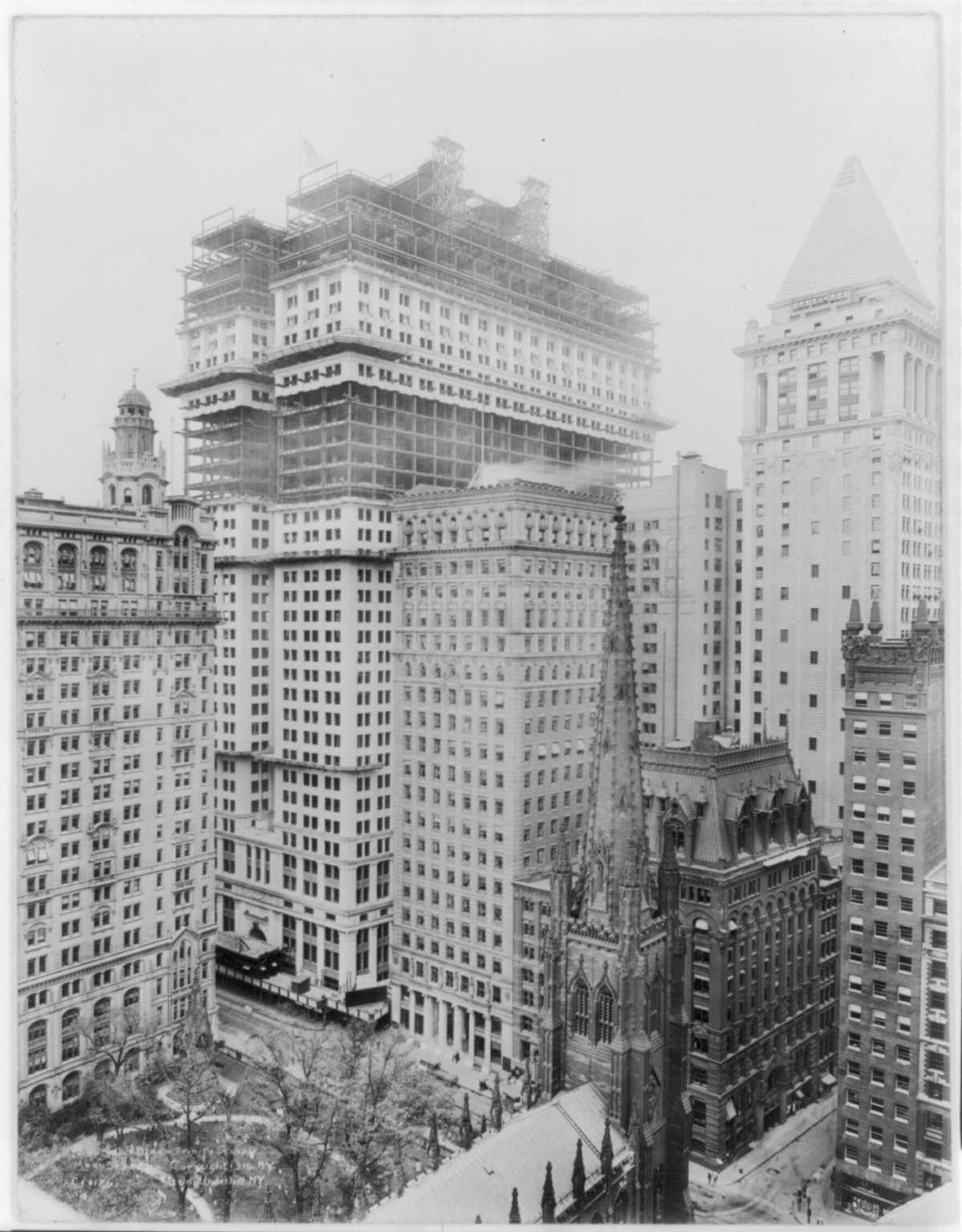
Trinity Church in 1914

As a boy of nine Reid became a chorister in the choir of Trinity Church, New York. This time of regular singing in a good choir at a young age had a profound influence on him: "Retrospectively, one of the great advantages of the training given the choirboys of Trinity Church at that time was that the technique of tone production was never a matter for discussion. To the contrary, we were simply encouraged to sing musically and to pronounce the words distinctly. Singing itself was the object of study, not the mechanics of singing. Looking back over the many decades I have been teaching singing, this has been a continuing emphasis, the purpose being to communicate through the act of singing itself."

Vocal fatigue

When his voice changed from soprano to baritone, he had voice lessons with various teachers in New York, including the vocal scientist Dr. Douglas Stanley for whom he was an assistant from 1934 to 1937. Through vocal strain brought on by confusing and contradictory voice training, he was forced to abandon a career in singing. He began to question the teaching methods being used and this induced him to develop his own ideas on functional vocal training, which, while completely based on earlier Italian methods, were combined with insights afforded by modern science. "...I spent hours at the New York Public Library researching books on vocal pedagogy. I had been so outraged because of the incompetence of the teaching I had experienced and witnessed that I was determined to search for better answers. I had come to realize that my vocal situation was not unique in that many promising young singers had been victimized. Indeed it appeared to be the rule rather than the exception." Dr. Stephen F. Austin also supports the researching of earlier books on bel canto: "...there are wonderful sources that can help us get back on track. Tosi's Observations on the Florid Song, Mancini's Practical Reflections on the Art of Singing are two great places to start. At first you may find the lack of detail frustrating. Specific exercises are rare, but the principles are stated clearly, and therein lies their greatest worth. These early writings lay the foundation for the work of C. Reid. He didn't invent the two-register theory, but he certainly rediscovered it and has made it available and useful. There are many valuable resources that every voice teacher should know: the writings of the Lampertis, García, Stockhausen, and of course, Cornelius Reid."

Research and teaching

In the 1940s Cornelius Reid was a pioneer in the research into the writings of singers and teachers (17th to 19th century) on early vocal techniques. This led him to write seven books and many articles on singing and bel canto. He taught voice in New York City for almost seventy five years, teaching until shortly before his 97th birthday. Many of his students have become well-known singers and voice teachers. He was invited to give many master classes in North America, Europe, as well as in Japan and Australia. His teaching has had influence on the teaching of singing in North America, Europe and Asia. Several cities in Germany offered 1- and 2-week master classes with him for up to eight years. His influence in Germany can easily be seen in the German version of Wikipedia: see the article: "Gesangsregister".

Criticism

Reid and others who have written about bel canto in the modern period, have inevitably been going against the mainstream and thus have always been open to criticism. Pedro de Alcantara, an Alexander teacher, supports both Reid as well as Husler/Rodd-Marling, who published Singing: The Physical Nature of the Vocal Organ in 1965: "The free-thinking Reid and the collaborating duo of Frederick Husler and Yvonne Rodd-Marling have put forth watertight arguments for the correct relationship of cause and effect as regards breathing and singing. Their books have proved highly controversial, yet their detractors, rather than disproving the points made by their writers, have resorted to ad hominem attacks such as 'He is crazy.' Alexander was fond of saying that 'it doesn't alter a fact because you can't feel it'. We can expand the dictum to say that it does not alter a fact because you cannot understand it, nor because you can not accept it." When Reid's first three books were published as a Trilogy in 1975, Richard Dyer-Bennet wrote: "Today's world, in all its aspects, seems to vacillate between mechanistic and mystical approaches to problems. As always, the true path lies somewhere between the extremes, and Reid indicates the path. Due partly to misinterpretation and partly simply to neglect, contemporary teachers have deserted the old, productive principles of bel canto. As author and teacher, Reid has now firmly re-established these principles and, with added insights of his own, leaves us with no excuse to again lose our way."

Writings on Bel canto

Reid's first book Bel Canto: Principles and Practices came out in 1950 and was followed by The Free Voice: A Guide to Natural Singing in 1965 and Voice: Psyche and Soma, 1975. These were later reprinted by the Joseph Patelson Music House in 1975 as a Trilogy. In 1977 he was awarded a grant by the Ford Foundation to compile A Dictionary of Vocal Terminology - An Analysis - the only one of its kind. Several more books came out in the 1990s including Essays on the Nature of Singing and a translation of Vocal Exercises: Their Purpose and Dynamics was published in Germany. For his 90th birthday a festschrift The Modern Singing Master: Essays in Honor of Cornelius L. Reid was published. Debra Greschner wrote in the Journal of Singing: "The annals of voice pedagogy are filled with references to singing masters of the bel canto era. Editors Ariel Bybee and James E. Ford, in their choice of title for this compendium, simultaneously acknowledge that pedagogical tradition and pay homage to the teacher they believe follows in that lineage: Cornelius L. Reid. Reid's publications are well known to any serious student of voice pedagogy." Several of his books have also been translated into German, Japanese and Korean.

== Pedagogy ==
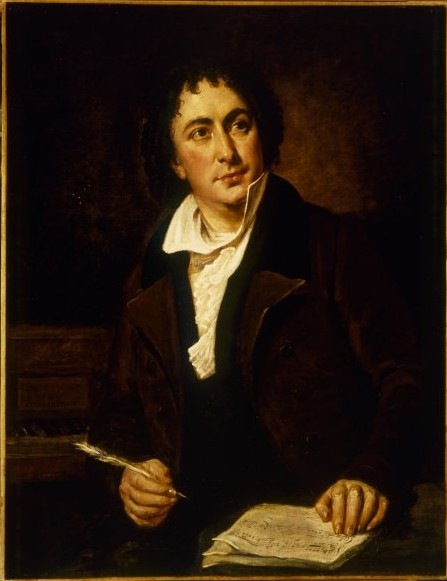
Isaac Nathan, c. 1820

Reid's teachings were based on the books of famous voice teachers of the 17th to the 19th centuries. They included Giulio Caccini, Pier Francesco Tosi, Giovanni Battista Mancini, Domenico Corri, Francesco Lamperti, Giovanni Battista Lamperti, Manuel Patricio Rodríguez García, Isaac Nathan and Julius Stockhausen.

In the festschrift Stephen F. Austin honors Cornelius Reid and those that have studied with him: "Only rarely does one find a voice teacher employing a method in which the registers of the voice are being used in the way that made singing in the bel canto era the greatest that mankind has known. If such a teacher is discovered, it is most likely that he or she has been influenced, directly or indirectly, by one man. Cornelius Reid has made a singular contribution to vocal pedagogy because he has kept the ancient traditions of teaching as established and tested in the fire of the eighteenth-century opera houses alive in the twentieth century—and now the twenty-first century."

A summary of Reid's pedagogy appeared in the Journal of Singing: "Reid's approach rests upon the two register theory and a belief that the only factors that can exert voluntary control upon the involuntary laryngeal muscles are pitch, intensity and vowel. Exercises employing various combinations of these three controls, in combination with the use of "functional listening"—a careful analysis of the registrational balances—will result in a free technique."

== Musical Education ==
- Choirboy in the Trinity Church Choir, Wall Street, New York, 1920–1925.
- Private vocal study with Dr. George Mead, New York, 1929.
- Private vocal study with Marie Wagner (pupil of Lilli Lehmann), New York, 1929–1930.
- Private coaching with Frieda Hempel, New York, 1930.
- Private coaching with Povla Frijsh, New York, 1932–1940.
- Private vocal study with Dr. Douglas Stanley, New York, 1934–1937.
- Studied at New York College of Music, New York, 1945–1947 with Dr. Frederick Kurzweil and Ruth Kisch-Arndt.
- Piano with Carl Werschinger, Professor Angela Weschler.

== Chronology ==
- Teacher of Voice, 1934–2008 in New York City
- Assistant to Dr. Douglas Stanley, 1934–1937
- Conducted WPA Music Project Chorus, 1939–1940, 1939 New York World's Fair, Flushing, NY
- Teacher of Voice, 1940–1941, Marymount College, Tarrytown, NY
- Conductor, Ars Musica Guild Chorus,1941–1943, Flushing, NY
- Conductor, Consolidated Edison Chorus, 1941–1943, Queens, NY
- Conductor, 107th US Navy Seabees Band, 1943–1945
- Teacher of Speech, 1946–1969, General Theological Seminary, Chelsea, NY
- Adjunct Professor, Teachers College, Columbia University, New York City, 1992–2008

== Publications ==
Books

- Bel Canto: Principles and Practices. Boston: Coleman & Ross, 1950. Reprinted, New York: Joseph Patelson Music House, 1975. ISBN 0-915282-01-1
- The Free Voice: A Guide to Natural Singing. Boston: Coleman & Ross, 1965. Reprinted, New York: Joseph Patelson Music House, 1975. ISBN 0-915282-02-X
- Voice: Psyche and Soma. New York: Joseph Patelson Music House, 1975. Reid's first three books were published as a trilogy in 1975. ISBN 0-915282-00-3
- A Dictionary of Vocal Terminology - An Analysis. New York: Joseph Patelson Music House, 1984. Reprinted, Huntsville, TX: Recital Publications, 1995. ISBN 0-915282-07-0, Reprint: ISBN 0-9663862-0-5
- Essays on the Nature of Singing. Huntsville, TX: Recital Publications 1992. ISBN 0-9663862-1-3
- Funktionale Stimmentwicklung: Zweck und Bewegungsablauf von Stimmübungen. Translated by Margaret Peckham and Leonore Blume, Mainz: Schott, 1994. Original Title: Vocal Exercises: Their Purpose and Dynamics. New York: 1988, unpublished. ISBN 3-7957-0268-2
- The Modern Singing Master: Essays in Honor of Cornelius L. Reid. Edited by Ariel Bybee and James E. Ford. Lanham, MD & London: Scarecrow Press, 2002. ISBN 0-8108-4241-6

Articles

- "Vocal Mechanics and the Cultivation of Listening Skills". Published on Cornelius Reid's web site.
- "Voice Science: An Evaluation", Australian Voice, Volume 11, (2005), 6-24.
- "Eighteenth Century Registrational Concepts", Journal of Singing, Volume 56, No. 4, (March/April 2000), p. 31-38.
- "Vocal Mechanics", Journal of Singing, Volume 54, No. 1, (Sept/Oct 1997), 11-18.
- "The Nature of Resonance", The Journal of Research in Singing, Volume XIV, (December 1990), No. 1, 1-26.
- "The Nature of the Vibrato", The Journal of Research in Singing, Volume XIII, No. 1, (June 1989, 39-61.
- "The Nature of Natural Singing", The Journal of Research in Singing, Volume XI, No. 2, (June 1988, 3-29.
- "The Intensity Factor in Vocal Registration", The Journal of Research in Singing, Volume IX, No. 1, (December 1985), 43-60.
- "Science and Vocal Pedagogy", The Journal of Research in Singing, Volume VII, No. 2, (June 1984), 21-33.
- "Functional Vocal Training" (Two part Essay), The Journal of Orgonomy, Volume 4, No. 2, (December, 1970), 231-249, and Volume 5, No. 1, (March,1971), 36-64.
- "Liturgical Speech", Bulletin of the General Theological Seminary, 1965.

== Master classes ==
- Musicians Club, Chicago, IL, 1965
- Musicians Club, Richmond, VA, 1966
- English Bach Festival, Oxford, England, 1967
- New York City, under the aegis of The Immaculate Heart College, Los Angeles, CA, 1967
- National Association of Teachers of Singing, 1975, 1976, 1986, 1997
- Westminster Choir College, Princeton, NJ, 1978
- Midwestern State University, Wichita Falls, TX, 1979
- Niederrheinische Musik und Kunstschule der Stadt Duisburg, Germany, 1984, 1996, 1997, 1998, 1999, 2000, 2001, 2002
- Hochschule für Musik und Theater München, Munich, Germany, 1985
- New York University, New York City, 1985
- Teachers College, Columbia University, New York City, 1989, 1993, 1997
- Ithaca College, Ithaca, NY, 1991
- Syracuse University, Syracuse NY, 1992
- Colgate University, Hamilton, NY, 1995
- Hoch Conservatory, Frankfurt and The Frankfurt Tonkünstlerbund, Germany, 1995, 1996, 1997, 1998, 1999, 2000, 2001, 2002
- Staatliche Hochschule für Musik und Darstellende Kunst Mannheim, Germany, 1996
- Congress of the Bundesverband Deutscher Gesangspädagogen, Munich, Germany, 1997
- School of Music, University of Washington in Seattle, 1998
- New York Singing Teachers Association, 1998, 2003
- Guildhall School of Music, London, England, 1998
- Wiesbadener Musik & Kunst Schule, Wiesbaden, Germany, 1998, 2000, 2001
- Hochschule für Musik und Darstellende Kunst Frankfurt am Main, Germany, 1999
- Howard Park Pentecostal Church, Toronto, Canada, 2000
- First Baptist Church, New York City, 2000
- Konservatorium der Stadt Wien, Vienna, Austria, 2001, 2002
- Folkwang Hochschule, Essen-Werden, Germany, 2001, 2002
- Théatre de Vevey, Vevey, Switzerland, 2002
- Mainz Hochschule, Mainz, Germany, 2002
- Hunter-Wade Studios, Chatham, New York, 2002
- School of Music, Syracuse University, Syracuse, New York, 2002
- American Center for the Alexander Technique, New York City, 2005
- The Hartt School, University of Hartford, Hartford, Connecticut, 2005

== Students of Cornelius Reid ==
- Margaretha Bessel
- Edmund Brownless
- Ariel Bybee
- Erik Cardwell
- Amy Cheifetz
- Clamma Dale
- Peggy Dufour
- Lenora Eve
- Joel Ewing
- Carole Farley
- Carol Baggott Forte
- Shaunette Hildabrand
- Rouwen Huther
- Kristine Kalina
- Madeline Kelly
- Pattie Kelly
- Robert Manno
- Donald Maxwell
- Dan Merriman
- Julian Patrick
- Gary R. Ramsey
- Susan von Reichenbach
- Donna Reid
- Jörg Schnass
- Diane Severson (Mori)
- Ellen Shade
- George Shirley
- John Stewart
- Dorothy Stone
- Cynthia Strike Petrow
- Sebastian Vittucci
- Mallory Walker
- Dirk Weiler
- Wendy White
