= Victoria Bundsen =

Swedish opera singer

Victoria Isabella Heliodora Bundsen, also known as Victoria Boni and Victoria de Bunsen (2 March 1839 in Brastad, Bohuslän – 18 February 1909 in London) was a Swedish opera singer (alto).

She was the daughter of vice governor Fr. Bundsen and Anna Juliana Otterdahl. She was a student of the Royal Swedish Opera in 1858 and debuted there in 1861. She was a student of Jean Jacques Masset in Paris and Lamperti in Milan. In 1865–1872, she was active under the name Victoria Boni as a prima donna alto in Modena.

In 1872, she was hired at Her Majesty's Theatre in London, where she enjoyed a successful career as "madame de Bunsen".

== Sources ==
- Victoria Isabella Heliodora Bunsen i Adolf Lindgren och Nils Personne, Svenskt porträttgalleri (1897), volym XXI. Tonkonstnärer och sceniska artister.
