= John Stewart (tenor) =

American opera singer (born 1940)

John Harger Stewart (born March 31, 1940) is an American tenor, conductor, and voice teacher who had an active international singing career in concerts and operas from 1964 to 1990. He began his career singing regularly with the Santa Fe Opera from the mid-1960s through the early 1970s; after which he appeared only periodically in Santa Fe up through the mid-1980s. He was particularly active with the New York City Opera during the 1970s and 1980s, and with the Frankfurt Opera from the mid-1970s through 1990. He also appeared as a guest artist with several other important American opera companies, including the Metropolitan Opera and the Washington National Opera, and at other European opera houses like the De Nederlandse Opera in Amsterdam, the Deutsche Oper Berlin, the Grand Théâtre de Genève in Switzerland, and the Wexford Festival Opera in Ireland. Now retired from singing, he is currently the Director of Vocal Activities at Washington University in St. Louis where he also teaches singing and conducts student opera productions and choirs. He also serves as the opera conductor at the Johanna Meier Opera Theater Institute at Black Hills State University.

== Early life and education ==
Born in Cleveland, Ohio, Stewart began studying the piano, violin, and viola as a child. For five years he was a soloist with what is now called the American Boychoir. He then attended Western Reserve Academy where he developed a strong interest in music theory and composition. He entered Yale University in New Haven, Connecticut, where he earned a Bachelor of Music degree in music composition. At Yale he studied composition with Mel Powell and voice with Blake Stern. He also was a leading member of the Spizzwinks and Whiffenpoofs, served as assistant director of the Yale Glee Club, and played string bass in both the Yale Concert Band and in a jazz octet. Stewart was also a tenor in and occasional conductor of the Yale Russian Chorus—an association which continued on and off for decades after his undergraduate years. Following his graduation from Yale, Stewart pursued graduate studies in music at Brown University in Providence, Rhode Island. While a student at Brown, he made his professional concert debut in 1964 as the tenor soloist in Felix Mendelssohn's Elijah with the Nashua Symphony in Nashua, New Hampshire. After earning a Master of Music degree from Brown in 1964, he spent a year doing post graduate work at the New England Conservatory. He then moved to New York City to pursue further vocal studies with Cornelius Reid and Frederick Jagel. For the next few years he supported himself in New York mainly by working as a music teacher and church choral conductor while only performing occasionally. By the late 1960s he was performing full-time.

== Professional career ==
Stewart made his professional opera debut in 1964 in the small role of the manservant in Alban Berg's Lulu at the Santa Fe Opera (SFO). He returned to the SFO frequently over the next decade, appearing first in supporting parts like Yarizhkin in the United States premiere of Dmitri Shostakovich's The Nose (1965), the Cavalier in the United States premiere of Paul Hindemith's Cardillac (1967), the Landlord in Richard Strauss' Der Rosenkavalier (1968), and Gastone in La traviata (1968). His first role at the SFO of any considerable size was that of Narraboth in Strauss' Salome in 1967; which he later repeated with the company in 1969, 1972, and 1978. Other leading roles he sang in Santa Fe during his early career were Pinkerton in Giacomo Puccini's Madama Butterfly (1968, 1972), 'One of the Called' in the United States premiere of Arnold Schoenberg's Die Jakobsleiter (1968), Ferrando in Wolfgang Amadeus Mozart's Così fan tutte (1969), and De Laubardemont in the American premiere of Krzysztof Penderecki The Devils of Loudun (1969). He later returned to Santa Fe as Filotero in the United States premiere of Francesco Cavalli's L'Orione (1983), Baron Lummer in Strauss' Intermezzo (1983), Count Elemer in Strauss' Arabella (1983), Guido Bardi in Alexander von Zemlinsky's Eine florentinische Tragödie (1984), Matteo in Erich Korngold's Violanta (1984), and Sebastian in the world premiere of John Eaton's The Tempest (1985).

In 1968 Stewart made his debut at the New York City Opera as Andrew, the Highlander, in the world premiere of Hugo Weisgall's Nine Rivers from Jordan. His first major role with the company came the following year as Vladimir in Alexander Borodin's Prince Igor with Julian Patrick in the title role and Julius Rudel conducting. He was committed to the NYCO up through 1974, performing in such parts as Tamino in The Magic Flute (1969, 1970, 1973), Belmonte in Die Entführung aus dem Serail (1969, 1970), Edgardo in Gaetano Donizetti's Lucia di Lammermoor (1969), Count Almaviva in The Barber of Seville (1971), the title role in Benjamin Britten's Albert Herring (1971), Alfredo in La traviata (1971, 1972, 1973, 1974), Don Ottavio in Don Giovanni (1972) and Sali in Frederick Delius' A Village Romeo and Juliet (1973). He later returned to the NYCO on numerous occasions in the 1980s, performing the parts of Tito in La Clemenza di Tito (1981), Pinkerton in Madama Butterfly (1983), Nanki-Poo in The Mikado (1984), Prince Karl Franz in The Student Prince (1987)., and Alfredo to Marilyn Mims' Violetta in La traviata in July 1987. His final performance with the NYCO was as Sid El Kar in Sigmund Romberg's The Desert Song in August 1987.

In addition to the NYCO and SFO, Stewart has performed as a guest artist with several other America opera companies. In 1971 he made his debut with the Philadelphia Lyric Opera Company as Cassio in Verdi's Otello with Jon Vickers in the title role. In 1972 he made his debut at the Washington National Opera as Sali in the United States premiere of Frederick Delius' A Village Romeo and Juliet. In 1973 he made his debut at the Metropolitan Opera as Don Ottavio in Mozart's Don Giovanni with John Reardon in the title role and Ignace Strasfogel conducting. With the Handel Society of New York he sang the role of Oronte in the New York premiere of Handel's Alcina, which had been performed only once before in the United States, on March 25, 1974, under the baton of Brian Priestman. The performance in Carnegie Hall, with Cristina Deutekom in the title role, was recorded. Other companies he has sung with include the Cincinnati Opera, the Florentine Opera, the Fort Worth Opera, the Houston Grand Opera, the Opera Theatre of Saint Louis, the Pittsburgh Opera, the San Antonio Grand Opera Festival, and the San Diego Opera among others. Some of the other roles in his repertoire include Cavaradossi in Tosca, Ernesto in Don Pasquale, Nadir in Les pêcheurs de perles, Nemorino in L'elisir d'amore, Roberto in Maria Stuarda, Rodolfo in La bohème, and Roméo in Roméo et Juliette.

In 1974 Stewart joined the roster of artists at the Frankfurt Opera in Germany. He remained a member of that company up until his retirement from the stage in 1990. During his career he also sang the concert repertoire with major orchestras like the New York Philharmonic, the Philadelphia Orchestra, and the Cleveland Symphony, among others. In 1990 he moved with his wife, stage director Jolly Stewart, to St. Louis where he worked for 21 years as the Director of Vocal Activities at Washington University in St. Louis. Currently he lives outside of New York City and continues to teach privately and give master classes. Each June he conducts and teaches at the Johanna Meier Opera Theatre Institute at Black Hills State University in Spearfish, SD.
