= Robert Moulson =

American opera singer

Moulson (left) with Julian Patrick, and Archie Drake in the 1970 world premiere of Carlisle Floyd's Of Mice and Men

Robert Moulson (26 November 1932 - 15 August 2003) was an American classical tenor who had an active international career in operas and concerts from the late 1950s through the 1980s. He became particularly associated with the role of Lenny Small in Carlisle Floyd's Of Mice and Men; a role which he recorded and portrayed in its original production at the Seattle Opera in 1970.

== Biography ==
Born in Cleveland, Ohio, Moulson studied with Frederick Jagel and Samuel Margolis in New York City before making his professional opera debut in 1958 with the New York City Opera as Sam Polk in Carlisle Floyd's Susannah. The New York Times stated of his performance that "Moulson's singing was excellent. His voice is a light but brilliant and well focused instrument of the sort that carries well in performance." He returned to that house several times up through 1983 in such roles as Pinkerton in Giacomo Puccini's Madama Butterfly, Alfredo in Giuseppe Verdi's La traviata, and Lenny Small in Floyd's Of Mice and Men.

Moulson notably created the role of Lenny Small in the world premiere of Floyd's opera at the Seattle Opera in 1970. He became widely identified with the part in following years, recording the role and portraying it with numerous opera companies throughout North America including the Houston Grand Opera in 1977. He returned to Houston in 1981 to portray Sugar Boy in the world premiere of Floyd's Willie Stark. Other roles in which he excelled were Aegisthus in Elektra, Canio in Pagliacci, Cavaradossi in Tosca, Don José in Carmen, the Duke of Mantua in Rigoletto, Edgardo in Lucia di Lammermoor, Don Fernando in La Favorite, Radames in Aida, and the title roles in Don Carlo, Faust, The Tales of Hoffmann, and Oedipus Rex.

Moulson also sang at other major American opera houses during his career, including the Opera Company of Boston, the Pittsburgh Opera, Portland Opera, Cincinnati Opera, the New Orleans Opera, and the San Francisco Opera. On the international stage he was particularly active in West Germany, appearing as a guest artist at the Hamburg State Opera, the Staatsoper Stuttgart, the Opern- und Schauspielhaus Frankfurt, the Deutsche Oper am Rhein, and at the opera houses in Cologne and Hanover. He also made a few appearances with the Vancouver Opera.
