= Bridgeport, Illinois =

Bridgeport
- City
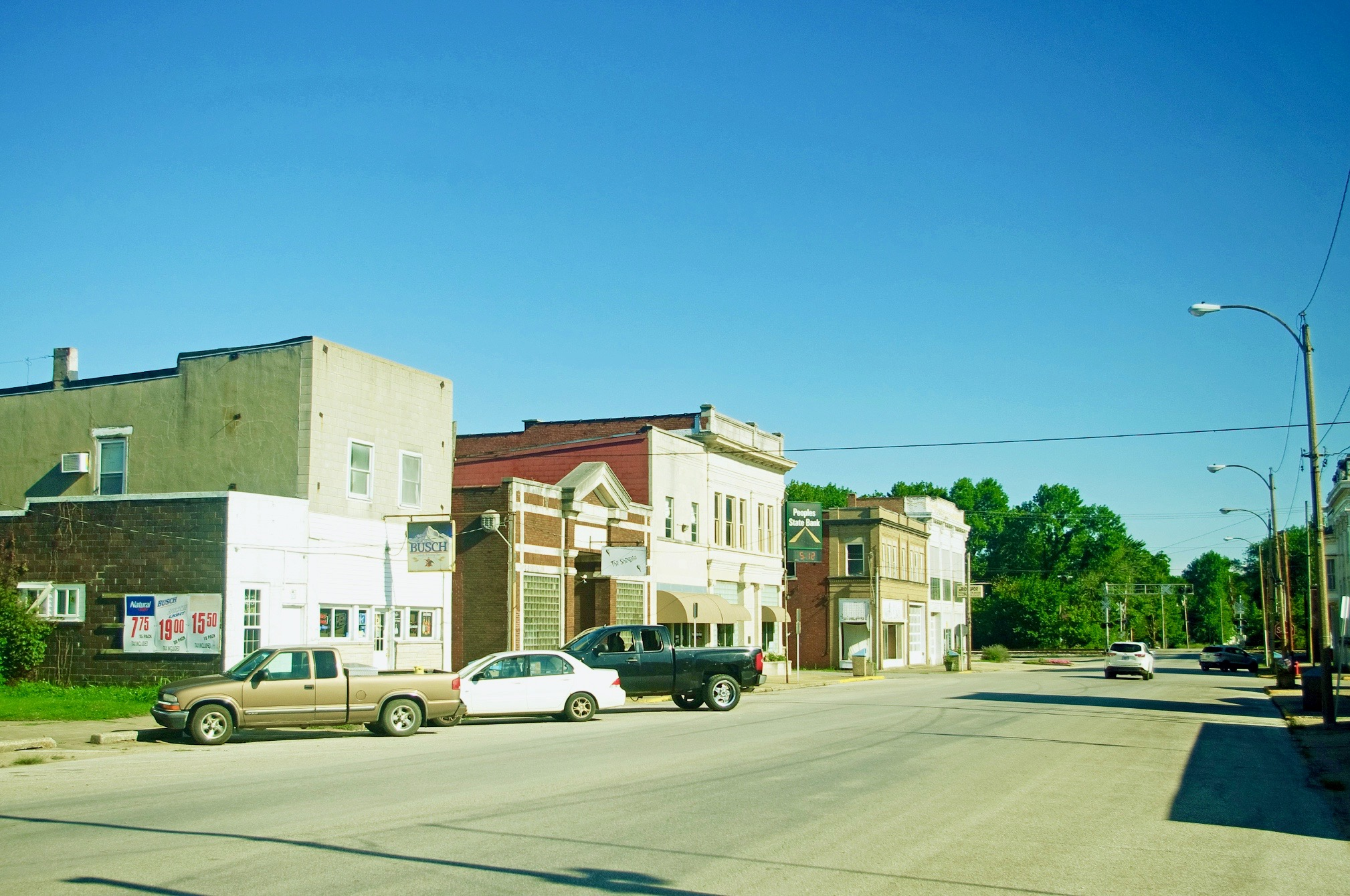
- Main Street

- Location of Bridgeport in Lawrence County, Illinois.
- Coordinates: 38°42′49″N 87°45′14″W
- Country: United States
- State: Illinois
- County: Lawrence
- Incorporated: 1896

Area
  - Total: 1.10 sq mi (2.84 km^{2})
  - Land: 1.07 sq mi (2.78 km^{2})
  - Water: 0.027 sq mi (0.07 km^{2})
- Elevation: 449 ft (137 m)

Population (2020)
  - Total: 1,800
  - Density: 1,678.9/sq mi (648.22/km^{2})
- Time zone: UTC-6 (CST)
  - Summer (DST): UTC-5 (CDT)
- Zip code: 62417
- Area code: 618
- FIPS code: 17-08186
- GNIS feature ID: 2393415

Bridgeport is a city in Lawrence County, Illinois, United States. As of the 2020 census, Bridgeport had a population of 1,800.

== History ==
Bridgeport was established in the mid-1850s as a stop along the Ohio and Mississippi Railway. It was named by a railroad official for the bridge that spanned Indian Creek, in the southern part of the city. Bridgeport incorporated in 1896.

== Geography ==
Bridgeport lies southwest of Lawrenceville along Illinois State Route 250.

According to the 2021 census gazetteer files, Bridgeport has a total area of 1.10 square miles (2.85 km^{2}), of which 1.07 square miles (2.77 km^{2}) (or 97.72%) is land and 0.03 square miles (0.08 km^{2}) (or 2.28%) is water.

== Demographics ==
Historical population
Census	Pop.	Note	%±
1880	450		—
1890	474		5.3%
1900	487		2.7%
1910	2,703		455.0%
1920	2,229		−17.5%
1930	2,315		3.9%
1940	2,143		−7.4%
1950	2,358		10.0%
1960	2,260		−4.2%
1970	2,262		0.1%
1980	2,281		0.8%
1990	2,118		−7.1%
2000	2,168		2.4%
2010	1,886		−13.0%
2020	1,800		−4.6%
U.S. Decennial Census

=== 2020 census ===
As of the 2020 census, Bridgeport had a population of 1,800. The median age was 39.4 years. 25.1% of residents were under the age of 18 and 16.1% of residents were 65 years of age or older. For every 100 females there were 100.7 males, and for every 100 females age 18 and over there were 96.6 males age 18 and over.

0.0% of residents lived in urban areas, while 100.0% lived in rural areas.

There were 719 households in Bridgeport, of which 33.7% had children under the age of 18 living in them. Of all households, 42.1% were married-couple households, 20.0% were households with a male householder and no spouse or partner present, and 31.6% were households with a female householder and no spouse or partner present. About 31.3% of all households were made up of individuals and 14.3% had someone living alone who was 65 years of age or older.

The population density was 1,640.84 inhabitants per square mile (633.53/km^{2}). There were 812 housing units at an average density of 740.20 per square mile (285.79/km^{2}). Of Bridgeport's housing units, 11.5% were vacant. The homeowner vacancy rate was 1.6% and the rental vacancy rate was 9.0%.

Racial composition as of the 2020 census
Race	Number	Percent
White	1,692	94.0%
Black or African American	29	1.6%
American Indian and Alaska Native	0	0.0%
Asian	3	0.2%
Native Hawaiian and Other Pacific Islander	1	0.1%
Some other race	14	0.8%
Two or more races	61	3.4%
Hispanic or Latino (of any race)	22	1.2%

=== Income and poverty ===
The median income for a household in the city was $58,085, and the median income for a family was $48,958. Males had a median income of $50,712 versus $27,875 for females. The per capita income for the city was $30,074. About 12.9% of families and 10.4% of the population were below the poverty line, including 11.1% of those under age 18 and 7.3% of those age 65 or over.

== Education ==
The Red Hill Junior/Senior High School is located in Bridgeport. The school mascot is the Saluki (Red Hill Salukis). Prior to the 1970s, the local high school was named Bridgeport High School. Its mascot was the Bulldogs. Bridgeport High School then consolidated with the neighboring town of Sumner, and the mascot for the new consolidated school became the Salukis. There is also an elementary school in Bridgeport called BGS, or Bridgeport Grade School.

== Sports ==
The Red Hill Junior High School Lady Salukis 2008 softball team went to the Illinois state championship and placed second.

In 1960, Bridgeport High School had a total school enrollment of only 385. That year the boys basketball team advanced to the State of Illinois IHSA basketball tournament finals to face a much larger Chicago team, John Marshall. At the time, Illinois, like Indiana in the movie Hoosiers, held a single-class tournament where all schools competed for the same championship. Chicago Marshall's enrollment was listed at 2,333, more than six times that of Bridgeport. Unlike the Indiana team in Hoosiers, Bridgeport lost the championship game, finishing its season with a 33–2 record.

== Notable people ==
- John Lankston, tenor with the New York City Opera and actor in Broadway musicals
- Gary Wagner, a pitcher for the Philadelphia Phillies and Boston Red Sox, was born in Bridgeport.
