= Samuel Margolis =

Latvian-born American voice teacher

- Born: 1883; Latvia, Russian Empire
- Died: November 13, 1982 (aged 98–99); Englewood, New Jersey, U.S.
- Occupation: Voice teacher
- Known for: Longtime voice teacher at the Metropolitan Opera
- Awards: Presidential Citation (1979)

Samuel Margolis (1883 – November 13, 1982) was an American voice teacher. Born in Latvia (then part of the Russian Empire), Margolis moved to the United States as a young child and grew up in New York City. He initially intended to pursue a career as an opera singer, but a throat injury forced him to change career paths.

Margolis was hired as a singing teacher by the Metropolitan Opera where he worked for several decades, first at the "Old Met" and later at the Metropolitan Opera House at Lincoln Center. He taught many leading singers as well as comprimario singers at the Met, including Robert Merrill and Jerome Hines. Merrill studied voice with him for more than four decades.

Margolis's voice studio also attracted students from outside the Met. He often worked with Broadway actors and stage personalities like Jose Ferrer and Gertrude Lawrence. He taught young aspiring singers, some of whom, such as Robert Moulson and Lucy Kelston, went on to have successful singing careers. President Jimmy Carter bestowed upon him a Presidential Citation in 1979 that praised him for his lengthy teaching career. He continued to give voice lessons up through 1981. He died in Englewood, New Jersey at the age of 99.
