= Frederick Jagel =

American singer, opera singer and music educator (1897–1982)

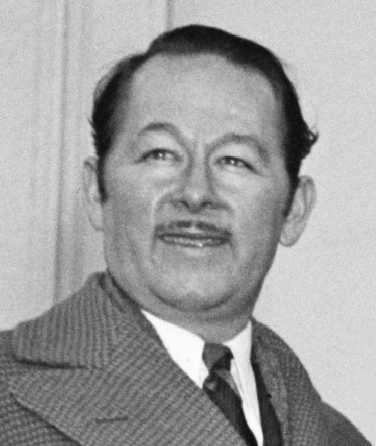
Jagel in 1937

Frederick Jagel (June 10, 1897, Brooklyn, New York – July 5, 1982, San Francisco, California) was an American tenor, primarily active at the Metropolitan Opera in the 1930s and 1940s.

== Early years ==
Jagel was born on June 10, 1897, in Brooklyn, New York, the son of a church-organist father and a pianist mother. When he was 4 years old he began to study music; during his youth he studied voice while working as a life-insurance actuary. He served in World War I, after which he sang in a church choir until a benefactor financed his going to Italy for advanced studies in singing.

== Life and career ==
Jagel studied voice in New York City and Milan. He debuted as Rodolfo in La bohème in Livorno, in 1924. He sang throughout Italy under the name of Federico Jaghelli. His San Francisco debut came in 1930 in The Girl of the Golden West. After his return to America, he made his debut at the Metropolitan Opera on November 8, 1927, as Radames in Aida. In 23 seasons with the Met, he sang 217 performances in 34 roles, primarily in the Italian and French repertories. He can be heard in recordings of many Metropolitan Opera radio broadcasts, most notably as Alfredo in La traviata opposite Rosa Ponselle, Pollione in Norma opposite Zinka Milanov, Don Alvaro in La forza del destino opposite Lawrence Tibbett, and as Edgardo in Lucia di Lammermoor opposite Lily Pons.

Jagel also appeared in San Francisco, Chicago and Buenos Aires before retiring in 1950. He taught singing in New York after his retirement. Among his pupils were tenors Augusto Paglialunga, David Romano, Robert Moulson and John Stewart, as well as bass-baritone Justino Diaz. He also served as Chairman of the Voice Department at the New England Conservatory of Music in Boston.

== Personal life and death ==
Jagel was married to Nancy Weir, who died in 1968. He married Virginia Garrett in 1970 in Boston, and they remained wed until his death. He had two sons. He died after a brief illness on July 5, 1982, in San Francisco, aged 85.

== Sources ==
- D. Hamilton (ed.),The Metropolitan Opera Encyclopedia: A Complete Guide to the World of Opera (New York: Simon and Schuster, 1987). ISBN 0-671-61732-X
