= Lucy Kelston =

American opera singer

- Lucy Kelston (photo with dedication as "Lucia Ferraris Kelston")
- Born: Lucy Kelston; December 23, 1923
- Died: April 28, 2010 (aged 86)
- Occupation: opera soprano singer

Lucy Kelston, also known as Lucia Ferraris Kelston (December 23, 1923 - April 28, 2010), was an American operatic soprano, primarily active in Italy during the 1950s.

== Life ==
Born in New York City, she studied at New York College of Music with Giuseppe de Luca and Samuel Margolis, and made her stage debut in 1947, as Madama Butterfly.

Noticed and helped by Arturo Toscanini, she entered the Vocal Contest of America, which led to her debut at La Scala in Milan, as Leonora in La forza del destino, opposite Mario Filippeschi, in 1949. The same year she sang Lady Macbeth on Italian radio (RAI), and in 1951, during the celebration of Verdi's death anniversary, she sang the title role in Luisa Miller, opposite legendary tenor Giacomo Lauri-Volpi, again on Italian radio. She sang widely in Italy, notably at the Maggio Musicale Fiorentino in 1955, where she sang Norma, alternating with Anita Cerquetti.

She also made guest appearances at the Royal Opera House in London, the Liceo in Barcelona, the Teatro Nacional Sao Carlos in Lisbon, the Teatro Colón in Buenos Aires. She was also active in concerts, appearing in New York, Amsterdam, Vienna, Budapest.

Kelston was married to Italian conductor Franco Ferraris, and was also known as Lucia Ferraris Kelston. She can be heard on record in the aforementioned radio broadcast of Luisa Miller, which was issued on vinyl longplay, and reissued on CD.

== Sources ==
- Operissimo.com
