= Carole Farley =

American opera singer

Carole Farley (born November 29, 1946) is an American soprano and a principal singer at the Metropolitan Opera.

== Early life and education ==
Farley was born in Le Mars, Iowa on November 29, 1946. She began her vocal training with Dorothy Barnes in Moscow, Idaho. She graduated from Indiana University School of Music in Bloomington with a bachelor's degree in music in 1968. There she studied singing with William Shriner. She was awarded a Fulbright scholarship and studied at the Hochschule für Musik in Munich in 1968-1969 under Marianne Schech. She later studied singing privately in New York City with Cornelius Reid.

She is married to conductor José Serebrier.

== Career ==
Farley began her performance career in 1968, and that year performed Richard Strauss's Four Last Songs with the Cleveland Philharmonic with her husband conducting. In 1969, she made her New York concert debut year at The Town Hall performing Benjamin Britten's song cycle Les Illuminations. That same year she made her opera debut as Formica in Peter Ronnefeld's Die Ameise at the Linz State Theatre in Germany, and performed the role of Magda Sorel in Spain's first production of Gian Carlo Menotti's The Consul in Madrid under the composer's direction. She sang leading roles at both La Monnaie and the Welsh National Opera in 1971 and 1972 and was resident artist at the Cologne Opera from 1972-1975.

In 1975, Farley made her debut with the Metropolitan Opera in a matinee performance as Mimi in La bohème. In 1977, she sang the title role in the Metropolitan Opera's premiere of Lulu. In the late 1970s and 1980s, she was known for singing demanding roles such as Lulu and the solo role in Poulenc's La voix humaine.

Farley has been collaborating in recent years with contemporary American classical composers including Ned Rorem, William Bolcom, and Lowell Liebermann on multiple concert and recording projects.

== Discography and videography ==
- DVD. Poulenc's La voix humaine and Menotti's The Telephone. Scottish Chamber Orchestra, dir. José Serebrier. Decca Music Group 1992, licensed to VAI 2006.
