= John Lankston =

American singer and actor

- Born: May 29, 1934; Bridgeport, Illinois
- Died: July 12, 2018 (aged 84); New York City, N.Y.
- Education: Vincennes University; University of Cincinnati – College-Conservatory of Music
- Occupations: Tenor; actor

John Lankston (29 May, 1934 - 12 July, 2018) was an American tenor and actor who had a career in opera and musical theatre from the 1950s through the 2000s. After making his Broadway debut in Redhead (1959), he went on to create the roles of Adolph and the Ziegfeld Tenor in Jule Styne's Funny Girl (1963) in which he was a featured soloist with Barbra Streisand. For his work, he and the rest of the main cast were awarded the Grammy Award for Best Musical Theater Album at the 7th Annual Grammy Awards. He was a regular performer with the New York City Opera from 1966 to 2001. His greatest success with the NYCO was his creation of the quintuple role of Voltaire/Pangloss/Businessman/Governor/Gambler in the 1982 revival of Leonard Bernstein's Candide which was directed by Hal Prince and filmed for national broadcast on PBS's Live from Lincoln Center. The company later recorded the production on disc, and Lankston and the rest of the artists involved were awarded the Grammy Award for Best Opera Recording in 1987.

Lankston most often performed supporting roles in his long tenure at the NYCO, often appearing in comedic character roles or villains. Occasionally he was given leading roles, including the title role in the United States premiere of Josef Tal's Ashmedai in 1976 in which his skills as both a singer and dancer were featured. Other larger parts he excelled in included the Prologue in Benjamin Britten's The Turn of the Screw (1970, 1971, 1972, 1975, 1978); Arbace in Mozart's Idomeneo (1974, 1975); Eisenstein in Johann Strauss II's Die Fledermaus (1976, 1986); the Devil in Stravinsky's L'Histoire du soldat (1977), Officer Olim in Kurt Weill's Silverlake: A Winter's Tale (1980); Satan/Lucifer in Igor Stravinsky's The Flood (1982); Ko-Ko in Gilbert and Sullivan's The Mikado (1984, 2001); Monostatos in Mozart's The Magic Flute (1985, 1992); and Torquemada in Maurice Ravel's L'heure espagnole (1990, 1999). With the NYCO he notably appeared in several world premieres, including the roles of Major Mark Lyon in Hugo Weisgall's Nine Rivers from Jordan (1968); Professor Clement in Gian Carlo Menotti's The Most Important Man (1971); Bentley Drummle in the world premiere of Dominick Argento's Miss Havisham's Fire (1979); and Dr. Sokolsky in the world premiere of Jay Reise's Rasputin (1988) He also portrayed Šapkin In the United States premiere of Leoš Janáček's From the House of the Dead (1989). His portrayal of The Schoolmaster in Janáček's The Cunning Little Vixen was broadcast on PBS's Live from Lincoln Center in 1983.

== Life and career ==
Born in Bridgeport, Illinois, Lankston was the son of Jason Lankston. He graduated from Bridgeport High School in 1952 and then pursued music studies at Vincennes University from which he graduated in 1954. He then pursued further music studies in opera at the University of Cincinnati – College-Conservatory of Music. While there he also trained in ballet and modern dance. After graduating, he moved to New York City in 1958 where he was soon cast in the chorus of Albert Hague and Dorothy Fields 1959 musical Redhead starring Gwen Verdon; eventually replacing William LeMassena as Howard Cavanaugh during the show's run. In 1961 he created the role of Lord Delmore in the original Broadway production of Robert Wright and George Forrest's operetta Kean at the Broadway Theatre, 53rd Street, which closed after 92 performances. In 1963 he portrayed Louis in the New York City Center revival of Pal Joey. starring Bob Fosse. That same year he created the roles of Adolph and the Ziegfeld Tenor in Jule Styne's Funny Girl, and was the featured tenor with Barbra Streisand in the song "His Love Makes Me Beautiful." For his work on the cast recording he was awarded the Grammy Award for Best Musical Theater Album at the 7th Annual Grammy Awards.

After Funny Girl closed, Lankston pursued further studies in opera in Germany before joining the roster of artists with the New York City Opera (NYCO) in 1966, making his debut as Pedrillo in Mozart's The Abduction from the Seraglio. He recorded that role on film four years later with the Peter Herman Adler's National Educational Television Opera on the NET network. He rose to become a huge star with NYCO, appearing in numerous operas with the company for 35 years. His last performance with the company was as Ko-Ko in The Mikado in 2001. In addition to performing with the NYCO, Lankston also portrayed Anfinomo in the United States premiere of Monteverdi's Il ritorno d'Ulisse in patria in 1974 with the Washington National Opera. In 1984 he starred in the American premiere of Harrison Birtwistle's Down by the Greenwood Side with the New York Philharmonic. He also portrayed the villainous Loge in Richard Wagner's Das Rheingold at the Earl W. Brydges Artpark State Park with conductor Christopher Keene in 1985.

Lankston died in Bridgeport, Illinois, on July 12, 2018, at the age of 84.

== NYCO roles ==
=== 1960s and 1970s ===
- Major Mark Lyon in Hugo Weisgall's Nine Rivers from Jordan (1968)
- Nereo in Arrigo Boito's Mefistofele (1969)
- Prologue in Benjamin Britten's The Turn of the Screw (1970, 1971, 1972, 1975, 1978)
- Basilio in Mozart's The Marriage of Figaro (1970, 1971)
- Gastone in Giuseppe Verdi's La traviata (1970, 1972, 1982, 1991, 1992)
- Lord Cecil in Gaetano Donizetti's Roberto Devereux (1970)
- Kaspar in Gian Carlo Menotti's Amahl and the Night Visitors (1970, with the American Boychoir School)
- Professor Clement in Gian Carlo Menotti's The Most Important Man (1971, world premiere)
- Roger Doremus in Lee Hoiby's Summer and Smoke (1972)
- First Praetorian soldier in Claudio Monteverdi's L'incoronazione di Poppea (1973)
- Arabace in Mozart's Idomeneo (1974, 1975)
- Hervey in Donnizetti's Anna Bolena (1974)
- Dancing Master in Puccini's Manon Lescaut (1974)
- Second Jew in Richard Strauss' Salome (1975)
- Victorin in Erich Korngold's Die tote Stadt (1975)
- Dancing Master and Scaramuccio in Richard Strauss's Ariadne auf Naxos (1975, 1982, 1983)
- Pong in Puccini's Turandot (1975)
- Achille in Jacques Offenbach's La belle Hélène (1976)
- Eisenstein in Johann Strauss II's Die Fledermaus (1976, 1986)
- the title role in Josef Tal's Ashmedai (1976, United States premiere)
- the Devil in Stravinsky's L'Histoire du soldat (1977),
- Bogdanovich in Franz Lehár's The Merry Widow (1978, 1988)
- L'Incredibile in Umberto Giordano's Andrea Chénier (1979)
- Bentley Drummle in the world premiere of Dominick Argento's Miss Havisham's Fire (1979)
- Sailor in Henry Purcell's Dido and Aeneas (1979)
- Dr. Caius in Verdi's Falstaff (1979, 1981, 1999)
- Guillot in Jules Massenet's Manon (1979, 1985)

=== 1980s ===
- Officer Olim in Kurt Weill's Silverlake: A Winter's Tale (1980)
- Detlef in Sigmund Romberg's The Student Prince (1980, 1987)
- The Schoolmaster in Leoš Janáček's The Cunning Little Vixen (1981, 1983, 1991, 1993)
- Lord Arturo Bucklaw in Donnizetti's Lucia di Lammermoor (1981, 1982, 1988)
- Voltaire/Pangloss/Businessman/Governor/Gambler in the 1982 revival of Leonard Bernstein's Candide (1982, 1983, 1984, 1986, 1989)
- Flaminio in Italo Montemezzi's L'amore dei tre re (1982)
- Satan/Lucifer in Igor Stravinsky's The Flood (1982)
- The Beadle in Stephen Sondheim's Sweeney Todd: The Demon Barber of Fleet Street (1984, 1987)
- Ko-Ko in Gilbert and Sullivan's The Mikado (1984, 2001)
- Trouffaldino in Sergei Prokofiev's The Love for Three Oranges (1985, 1986)
- Monostatos in Mozart's The Magic Flute (1985, 1992)
- Marquis de Lisle in Dominick Argento's Casanova's Homecoming (1985, 1987)
- the Master of Ceremonies in Jules Massenet's Cendrillon (1986)
- Curzio in Mozart's The Marriage of Figaro (1986)
- Beppe in Ruggero Leoncavallo's Pagliacci (1987)
- Spoletta in Puccini's Tosca (1987, 1988, 1991, 1993, 1994)
- Admiral de Jean in Sigmund Romberg's The New Moon (1988)
- Dr. Sokolsky in the world premiere of Jay Reise's Rasputin (1988)
- Šapkin In the United States premiere of From the House of the Dead "John+Lankston"

=== 1990s ===
- Torquemada in Maurice Ravel's L'heure espagnole (1990, 1999)
- Ciccio in Frank Loesser's The Most Happy Fella (1991)
- Ambrogio in Rossini's The Barber of Seville (1992, 1998)
- Mogul in world premiere of Ezra Laderman's Marilyn (1993)
- Brazilian Ambassador, Solo Policeman, and An Associate Editor in Leonard Bernstein's Wonderful Town (1994)
- Gobin in Puccini's La rondine (1995)
- Supervisor in Stewart Wallace's Harvey Milk (1995)
- Father in Toshiro Mayuzumi's Kinkakuji (1995)
- General Mercier in the United States premiere of Jost Meier's Dreyfus Affair (1996)
- Sylvester von Schaumber in Paul Hindemith's Mathis der Maler (1995)
- Gelsomino in Rossini's Il viaggio a Reims (1999)
