= Howard Boatwright =

American composer, violinist and musicologist

Howard Leake Boatwright Jr. (March 16, 1918 – February 20, 1999) was an American composer, violinist and musicologist.

== Biography ==
Born in Newport News, Virginia, Boatwright studied the violin with Israel Feldman in Norfolk, Virginia, and made his début at New York Town Hall in 1942. He was assistant professor of violin at the University of Texas, Austin from 1943 to 1945. He then studied music theory and composition at Yale University (BM 1947, MM 1948), where he met Paul Hindemith, with whom he studied the viola d'amore. Hindemith urged him to stay at Yale to teach as assistant professor in music theory.

He planned to become a violinist instead of a composer, but began writing music in 1941 as a way to court the soprano Helen Strassburger. They were married in 1943 and performed and recorded new music, standard vocal works, and early music together for many years. Helen Boatwright continued to have a distinguished career as a teacher and performer, sometimes in collaboration with her husband and sometimes independently. The couple had three children: a daughter Alice and two sons, Howard III and David Alexander.

Boatwright became the music director at St Thomas's Church, New Haven, Connecticut, in 1949, a position he held until 1964. It was there that he established a reputation as a pioneer in the performance of early choral music. While in New Haven he also served as conductor of the Yale University Orchestra from 1952 to 1960, and he was the concertmaster of the New Haven Symphony Orchestra from 1950 until 1962.

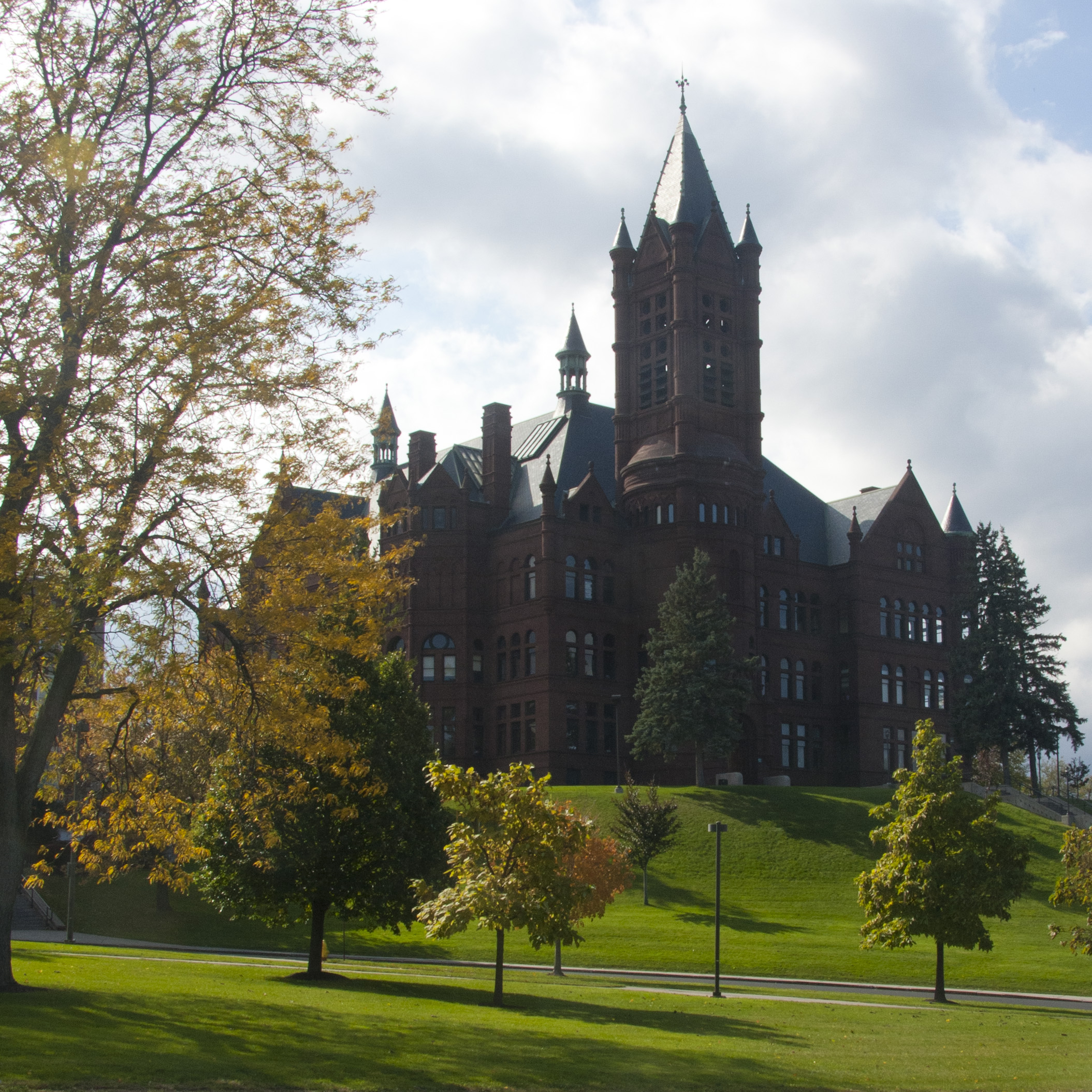
The music school at Syracuse University; Howard Boatwright helped transform the school while he was dean.

In 1964 he became the dean of the school of music at Syracuse University, and from 1971 he also served as a professor of music in composition and theory. At Syracuse, he transformed the music school, making it an important center for composition and the performance of new music by presenting festivals and establishing an electronic music studio. He also introduced non-Western music to the curriculum, and expanded its early music programs by acquiring collections of antique instruments. From 1969 to 1988, when he stopped teaching, he also directed a summer music program in Switzerland.

He was a Fulbright lecturer in India during the year 1959–60 and received a Fulbright grant to study in Romania, 1971–72. A pioneering scholar of Charles Ives, he was elected to the board of directors of the Charles Ives Society in 1975. He wrote about music theory, ethnomusicology, Charles Ives, and Paul Hindemith.

Boatwright died in Syracuse, New York.

== Music ==
Boatwright's musical compositions are full of chromaticism, although "adhering to traditional classical structures and by using rugged harmonies to support arching, shapely themes, he invariably created pieces with an appealing clarity, directness and emotional resonance".

He initially concentrated on sacred choral music, but later added secular works for chorus and solo songs with piano or instruments, and instrumental works. The most notable of his instrumental works are the Quartet for clarinet and strings, which received an award from the Society for the Publication of American Music in 1962; the Symphony; and his Second String Quartet.

His earliest choral works are modal, and he "revived the modalities of early church music, using modern harmonies and linear counterpoint". The subsequent chamber works were influenced by Hindemith's middle-period style. In 1966 Boatwright started to develop a style he referred to as 'dodecaphonic, though not serial', where he appropriated the total of chromatic resources while still exercising control over harmony, all within the context of a layered, contrapuntal approach. This technique (described in his book Chromaticism) is demonstrated in his Second Quartet, a work both consistent in style and impressive in its ability to project a wide variety of moods.

Most of his songs were inspired by his wife's "clear-voiced soprano". "Though his refined, intelligent, atonal songs require advanced musicianship, the natural declamation and pliant, expressive vocal lines make them gratifying to sing." His compiled set of Five Early Songs are highlighted by Carmen et al., requiring "an intelligent singer with good technique and musicianship." Clifton referred to his songs titled From Joy to Fire as "an effective cycle of five brief songs".

== Writings ==
- Introduction to the Theory of Music (New York, 1956)
- Indian Classical Music and the Western Listener (Bombay, 1960)
- "Ives' Quarter-Tone Impressions", Perspectives of New Music, iii/2 (1964–65), 22–31
- "Paul Hindemith's Performances of Old Music", Hindemith-Jahrbuch 1973, 39–62
- Chromaticism: Theory and Practice (Fayetteville, New York, 1994)
- Essays Before a Sonata, The Majority, and Other Writings by Charles Ives (ed.) (New York. 1970)

== Musical works ==
Orchestra

- A Song for St Cecilia's Day, large string ensemble, 1948
- Variations, small orchestra, 1949
- Symphony, 1976

Instrumental and keyboard

- String Quartet no.1, 1947
- Trio, 2 violins and viola, 1948
- Serenade, 2 string instruments, 2 wind instruments, 1952
- Quartet, clarinet and strings, 1958
- String Quartet no. 2, 1974
- Twelve Pieces for Violin Alone, 1977
- Sonata, clarinet and piano, 1980
- Orgelbuch, organ solo
- Eight Preludes, organ solo
- other chamber and keyboard works

Large choral works

- The Women of Trachis (Sophocles, trans. Ezra Pound), 6 choruses, female voices, chamber orchestra, 1955
- Mass, C major, 1958
- The Passion According to St. Matthew, solo voices, SATB, organ, 1962
- Canticle of the Sun (St. Francis of Assisi), soprano solo, SATB, orchestra, 1963
- Music for Temple Service, baritone solo, SATB, organ, 1969
- A Song for St. Cecilia's Day, soprano solo, SATB, orchestra, 1981
- Nunc Dimittis and Magnificat, SATB, organ, 1997
- other choral works, including four masses, many partsongs

Church anthems

- Ah, holy Jesus, how has thou offended (from The Passion According to St. Matthew)
- All praise to thee (from The Passion According to St. Matthew)
- Alone thou goest forth, O Lord (from The Passion According to St. Matthew)
- Creator of the Stars (Advent Hymn)
- For sins of heedless word and deed (from The Passion According to St. Matthew)
- God is our Refuge (Psalm 46)
- Go to dark Gethsemane (from The Passion According to St. Matthew)
- Hear my cry, O God (Psalm 61)
- Jesus, all thy labor vast (from The Passion According to St. Matthew)
- Morning Hymn
- Nunc sancte nobis Spiritus (Come, Holy Spirit)
- O sacred head, sore wounded (from The Passion According to St. Matthew)
- The Royal banners forward go (from The Passion According to St. Matthew)
- Star in the East (Christmas)
- We sing of God the mighty source (Christopher Smart)
- When I survey the wondrous cross (from The Passion According to St. Matthew)
- Who was the guilty? (from The Passion According to St. Matthew)

Voice

- Five Early Songs (various poets), soprano and piano, 1946–1954, published 1993
1. Requiescat (Oscar Wilde)
2. On Hearing the Birds Sing (Irish)
3. o by the by (e.e. cummings)
4. At the Round Earth's Imagined Corners (John Donne)
5. Revelation (B. T. Coler)
- Grant us Peace, medium voice and organ, published by the Sacred Music Press of the Hebrew Union College, 1961
- The Ship of Death (D.H. Lawrence), SATB solo quartet, string quartet, 1966
- The Lament of Mary Stuart (text from a Carissimi cantata), soprano, harpsichord/piano, optional 'cello, 1968
- Six Prayers of Kierkegaard (trans. P. LeFevre), soprano and piano, 1978, published 1985
1. Grant that our prayer
2. And when at times
3. It is from thy Hand
4. When the thought of thee
5. Thou has commanded us to forgive
6. Be near to us with thy power
- Three Morning Hymns, soprano and violin, published 1985
- Dover Beach (Matthew Arnold), soprano and string quartet, published 1985
- Five Songs (Victoria Hill), soprano and piano, published 1985
1. Flowing Sheets of Rain
2. The Armadillo and the Acorn
3. A Painful Sweetness
4. Rain Melodies
5. Thought Patterns
- Prologue, Narrative and Lament (Walt Whitman), tenor and string quartet, published 1987
- From Joy to Fire (Ursula Vaughan Williams), mezzo-soprano and piano, published 1989
1. He Followed Me, He Courted Me
2. Here's Solitude in Which My Life Must Grow
3. Little Fruits, Wild-Herb Leaves of Summer
4. So Long, So Long Since Any Hand Has Touched Me
5. Now I Know All
- Adoration and Longing (Biblical Song of Solomon), soprano and string quartet, published 1991
- Three Songs of Eternity (Emily Dickinson), soprano and clarinet, published 1991
- Three Song (e.e. cummings), soprano, flute, and bassoon, published 1994
- In Illo Tempore: Three Biblical Narratives, medium voice and piano, published 1994
- Five Poems of Sylvia Plath, soprano and piano, published 1995
- Three French Songs (various poets), voice and piano
- Three Love Songs (Emily Dickinson), soprano and piano
- Folksong arrangements, published by Oxford University Press
- other unpublished solo songs
