= Nine Rivers from Jordan =

American opera, premiered 1968

Nine Rivers from Jordan is an opera in a prologue and three acts by composer Hugo Weisgall. The work uses an English libretto by Denis Johnston who derived the libretto from the book of the same title he wrote based on his experiences as a BBC radio reporter during World War II. The work premiered on October 9, 1968, at the New York City Opera. The opera musically, dramatically and symbolically attempts to deal with the unprecedented moral problems caused by the circumstances of the Second World War. The use of many different languages in the libretto, the rapid changes of scene and the geographical extent of the action mirror the universal involvement and confusion of those years. In the opera, actual happenings and imaginary events are juxtaposed.

== Synopsis ==
Don Hanwell, a British soldier stationed in the desert by the Dead Sea, is warned by a mysterious woman not to carry a weapon, as it is ordained that man will meet his death according to the arms he bears. Don heeds her warning and goes weaponless for the rest of the war, but this fact, coupled with Don’s general indifference to questions of right or wrong, causes him to allow a German prisoner, Otto Suder, to escape. Subsequently, Suder becomes a guard at Todenwald, a German concentration camp.

In a scene on the Brocken, legendary site of the Walpurgisnacht, an allegorical trial takes place to fix the guilt for the atrocities committed at Todenwald. Don himself feels guilty for his part in Suder’s escape years before. Though the verdict of the court is that all mankind is guilty, it pronounces that if Suder dies God will forgive everyone else. Don, feeling it is his duty to kill Suder, takes a hand grenade and sets out to find him.

In the last days of the war Don and a companion, Copperhead Kelly, find Suder, disguised as an English soldier, trying to escape into Italy. When Don announces he has come to kill him, Suder tricks him into taking his identification papers and convinces a mob of refugees that Don is a Nazi and he, Suder, is a British soldier. Copperhead Kelly makes no attempt to come to Don’s defense and Don feels betrayed. A woman in the mob takes the grenade from Don and gives it to Suder, who then throws it in an attempt to kill them all but succeeds only in killing himself. Don calls upon Heaven for an explanation of his betrayal and, in a dialogue with God, who speaks with the voice of Copperhead Kelly, is finally made to realize that, though we must accept all of life, both good and bad, we ourselves have the personal responsibility for making the choice between right and wrong and, though we are all “dirty,” we are not all damned.

== Roles ==
Role	Voice type	Premiere Cast, October 9, 1968 (Conductor: – Gustav Meier)
Private Don Hanwell	baritone	Julian Patrick
Sergeant Abe Goldberg	bass	Joshua Hecht
Copperhead Kelly	baritone	Paul Huddleston
Otto Suder	tenor	David Clements
Salt Woman/The Pieta/Woman D.P.	soprano	Eileen Schauler
Lieutenant Jean l'Aiglon	tenor	William Brown
Father Matteo Angelino	bass	William Ledbetter
Major Mark Lyon	tenor	John Lankston
Captain Reverend Lucius Bull	bass-baritone	Will Roy
Andrew, the Highlander	tenor	John Stewart
Dead Man	tenor	Joaquín Romaguera
Little Jim Clap	tenor	Kellis Miller
Pepper Johnny	baritone	Raymond Gibbs
Tom Tosser	tenor	Nico Castel
Simple Simon	baritone	Raymond Papay
Sergeant Pete Fisher	bass-baritone	Michael Devlin

== Bibliography ==
Libretto published by Theodore Presser, Bryn Mawr, Penna., 1968. Reprinted with revisions in The Dramatic Works of Denis Johnston, Vol. 2, Colin Smythe, 1979.
