= Willie Stark =

- Opera by Carlisle Floyd
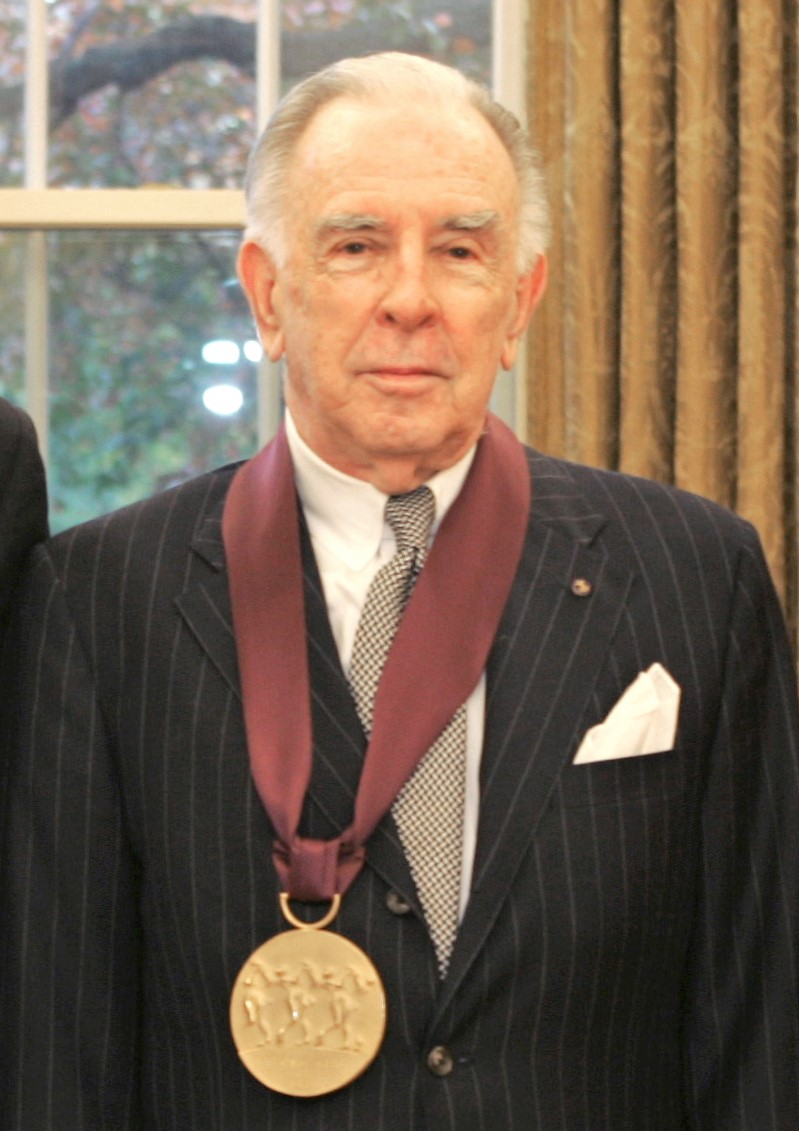
- Carlisle Floyd in 2004 with the National Medal of Arts
- Librettist: Floyd
- Language: English
- Based on: All the King's Men by Robert Penn Warren
- Premiere: April 24, 1981; Houston Grand Opera

Willie Stark is an opera in three acts and nine scenes by Carlisle Floyd to his own libretto, after the 1946 novel All the King's Men by Robert Penn Warren, which in turn was inspired by the life of the Louisiana governor Huey Long. The opera was commissioned by the Houston Grand Opera, which premiered it on April 24, 1981, in a production directed by Harold Prince and conducted by John DeMain. The original production was dedicated to the American radio journalist Lowell Thomas. Floyd made cuts to the score for a television presentation of the opera, and the edited version was shown on US public television in September 1981.

The opera was remounted in 2007 by the Louisiana State University Opera. The composer visited the university and advised on the production. The production was recorded and released on DVD, by Newport Classic.

The work generated some small controversy among music critics, as it draws upon elements of Broadway musical theater more than Floyd's other more traditionally operatic works. The involvement of Broadway director Harold Prince in the initial production contributed to the emphasis of these elements of the work. In the years since its premiere, this sort of blurring of boundaries between opera and Broadway musicals has become commonplace.

== Roles ==
| Role | Voice type | Premiere Cast, April 24, 1981 (Conductor: – John DeMain) |
|---|---|---|
| Willie Stark, Governor | baritone | Timothy Nolen |
| Jack Burden, aide to Willie Stark | tenor | Alan Kays |
| Anne Stanton, Jack's fiancé | soprano | Julia Conwell |
| Judge Courtney Burden | bass-baritone | Don Garrard |
| Sadie Burke, Stark's administrative assistant | mezzo-soprano | Jan Curtis |
| Sugar Boy, bodyguard to Willie Stark | tenor | Robert Moulson |
| Mrs. Stark, mother of Willie Stark | soprano | Lynn Griebling |
| Lucy, daughter of Willie Stark | soprano | Lisa de la Reza |
| "Tiny" Duffy, Lieutenant Governor | tenor | David Vosburgh |
| Jeff, a Senator | tenor | Bruce Ford |
| Hugh, another Senator | baritone | Robert Ousley |
| George William, butler to Judge Burden | speaking role | Herbert Wilkerson |
| Mayor | speaking role | Donald Bess |
| Reporter | speaking role | Graydon Vaught |
| Radio Announcer | spoken and pre-recorded | Lowell Thomas |

== Synopsis ==
The setting is 1935, in the state capital of an unnamed southern American state. The story covers a period of 10 days.

Willie Stark is a southern American politician, of humble origin, now a state governor. He began his political career as an idealist and champion of the working class, but as his career progresses, he becomes more and more corrupt, shrewd and ruthless, willing to stretch the boundaries of the law as far as he can.

The plot involves Governor Stark's attempts to avoid impeachment for his tampering with his state's legal system for his own ends, by which he has ruined many lives. Meanwhile, he falls in love with socialite Anne Stanton. Anne is engaged to marry Jack Burden, the Governor's aide. Judge Burden, Jack's father, is a highly respected judge and favors impeaching Stark. Willie tries to persuade Anne to break off her engagement with Jack and marry him instead, which she finally agrees to do. The governor’s longtime political associate and advisor, Sadie Burke, finds Willie Stark and Anne together. Sadie is furious at this, and realizes that she is no longer the only woman in his life.

At one point, Judge Burden is charged with bribery. Jack finds evidence to support the accusation, though he does not want to believe the evidence. Jack confronts his father, after which Judge Burden commits suicide, with a pistol hidden in his desk. A few days later, Jack is distraught to learn from Sadie of Anne’s plans to marry the Governor. At the end, Willie is giving a speech to a crowd. Jack emerges from the crowd and assassinates the Governor, and in turn, Jack is killed.
