= Douglas Stanley =

American vocal pedagogue and scientist

Douglas Stanley (7 April 1890 (Note: Some sources erroneously list Stanley's birth year as 1889.) – 19 April 1958) was an English-born American vocal pedagogue and scientist. Best known as the voice teacher of Nelson Eddy and Cornelius Reid, he was at the forefront of the field of voice science, pioneering instruments, methodologies, and techniques of standardization in researching and measuring vocal acoustics, use, and behaviors—especially in the act of singing.

== Early life and education ==
Douglas Stanley was born Stanley Douglas Zossenheim in London in 1890 to Leopold Zossenheim and Charlotte Minnie Evelyn Joseph. His sister Gladys Constance Julia was two years older. A brother Eric Joseph had been born and died a year before Stanley's birth.

He was educated in English private schools until age thirteen, after which he entered Rugby and remained there till age sixteen. In 1906 he matriculated at the Imperial College of Science and Technology, University of London, majoring in chemical and electrical engineering. His four years' study in scientific research, under Professor Henry E. Armstrong, ended in a degree of A.C.G.I., the equivalent to the bachelor's degree in American colleges.

Douglas Stanley was also a lover of music and singing. He studied voice from the age of sixteen and later attended Trinity College of Music and Guildhall School of Music, where he remained until he was twenty-five. From age sixteen to twenty-eight, Stanley was under the tutelage of seven private teachers, including Joseph O’Mara.

Despite Stanley's account not according with the facts of the end of Garcia's life, he wrote about his putative studentship under the important teacher and researcher:

Many people have asked the question: “Why is the Golden Age of Song past?” ‘The answer is “Bad teaching’. When I was a young man, I studied with a number of teachers in Europe, among them Emmanuel Garcia. He was typical of the old school. He didn’t really teach technic at all. He couldn’t do anything to improve my voice radically, or those of his other pupils, but he did not interfere with a naturally good technic. He encouraged his pupils to sing full voice and he emphasized the attack. His corrections took a form of “No! not like that; like this,” and he would sing a remarkably free tone for so old a man. He used to say — "I can place a book on the piano, so! But you cannot place your voice!” Each lesson I had to know a new Concone exercise and he taught me how to sing songs. He had the picture of power and freedom—he knew that a voice should ring out over the orchestra and fill an opera house. He never hurt a pupil’s voice. He didn’t “place” it in the nose, or “in the masque’, and he didn’t teach “breath control’. Thus, if a pupil with a great voice went to study with him, he kept it, and a great singer was allowed to appear.

Stanley claimed that beyond some knowledge in music and interpretation, he obtained no technical vocal information from his experience as a student of singing. At the end of his studies he could not sing a single line on pitch or in time, and his range was extremely curtailed, the while having suffered neck distortions and having been under the care of a throat specialist.

== Career ==
In 1915, Stanley emigrated to the United States and later became a citizen. In 1917, he married Alma Danziger, a French-American pianist. In 1917–18 he became a critic for Musical America, which sent him to South America as their Buenos Aires correspondent. On his return to New York, he decided to take up the teaching of voice as his profession, despite having no special training as a voice teacher.

While in South America and in New York, he had to opportunity to hear and come into contact with such singers as tenor Enrico Caruso; sopranos Emmy Destinn, Nellie Melba, and Rosa Raisa; contralto Gabriella Besanzoni; baritones Mario Sammarco and Armand Crabbé; and bass Marcel Journet. But as a new teacher, he did not understand what made it possible for these singers to do what they did. Nor did he understand how to impart the "how" to a student. But it occurred to him, too, that to a degree this was true of his competitors and most of his predecessors.

Because he had been trained as an engineer and realized that the voice was in some way related to the physics of sound, he went back to school to ascertain the nature of that relationship, enrolling in the Physics Department of New York University, where he worked on acoustical research in cooperation with Dr. H. H. Sheldon, head of department. As Stanley also knew that the voice had some relationship to the vocal folds, tongue, throat and the laryngeal, pharyngeal, and thoracic muscular systems, he became affiliated with the Medical College at NYU and its Dean of the Department of Physiology, Professor Holmes C. Jackson. In 1920, Stanley earned the degree of Master of Science from NYU.

Stanley was associated with or member of the Acoustical Society of America, the Franklin Institute, and American Association for the Advancement of Science. In 1938 he was awarded the honorary degree of Doctor of Music College by Puget Sound at its fiftieth anniversary convocation.

=== Teaching Work ===
At various times teaching at the Ansonia Hotel or his home at Riverside Drive, he had in his studio actor/baritone Nelson Eddy, tenor Thomas LoMonaco, choral conductor Silas Engum, musical theater baritone Bruce Foote, Alice Swedborg (later Stanley), cantor Raymond Smolover, among dozens of other singers.

From 1931 Stanley also had as student the vocal pedagogue and writer Cornelius Reid, who entered his studio at age 19. Reid felt that Stanley's method did improve his voice at first, but after a while he became disenchanted with Stanley's domineering demeanor and demands that Reid work even more vigorously in his vocal training. Nevertheless, Reid stayed with Stanley, who had eventually hired him as secretary and assistant, sending him voice students who couldn't afford Stanley's fee. But Reid became more and more frustrated.

With the passing of time, I realized that Dr. Stanley’s method of teaching may have been based on certain scientifically verifiable truths, but when translated into a practical pedagogy, it could be badly misused... Stanley was sadistic and overbearing and enjoyed belittling everyone falling under his influence.

[...]

[My] pent-up rage finally came to a head one day while driving Stanley and his wife back from a weekend in the country. We were engaged in a conversation during which some remark was made by me concerning my mother. Stanley dismissed what I said, making the following comment: “Well, she is nothing but a charwoman.” With that I slammed on the brakes of the car, jerking it to a halt in the middle of Riverside Drive and Eighty-Fifth Street. Consumed by rage, I yanked open the door to the rear seat of the car, reached across the body of Stanley’s wife, Alma, grabbed him by the throat and shook him violently as though he were a rag doll. He was terrified, I was out of my mind, and if not for the intervention of his wife, instead of spending sixty years on a piano bench I would have spent them confined to a prison cell.

It was this confrontation that cause Reid to break off with Stanley and begin his own 70-year-long investigation into the voice and singing and a writing career that yielded, among other works, the influential trilogy Bel Canto: Principles and Practices (1950), The Free Voice: A Guide to Natural Singing (1965), and Voice: Psyche and Soma (1975). Despite the disintegration of their relationship, Reid was strongly influenced by some of Stanley's concepts and findings, particularly his definition of registers and his principle of two registers, both of which Reid cited consistently throughout his own career.

Douglas Stanley died April 19, 1958, in Los Angeles. He left a son Douglas Eric Stanley (later Eric Stanley Engum), who became a reputable clinical neuropsychologist.

=== Voice Science Work ===
In 1931, Douglas Stanley embarked upon what was the most direct and scientific study of singing undertaken until that point. AT&T's Electrical Research Products (ERPI) branch dealt with scientific experimentation concerning talking motion pictures. ERPI also produced and distributed nationally known educational motion pictures. There was a need at the time to develop scientific data and standards about motion picture soundtracks and the general subject of (electrical) vocal reproduction, both in their nascent stages.

To that end EPRI called upon Douglas Stanley in 1931 to formulate scientific tests for singers and to investigate the voice by employing some $70,000 (US$1,413,935 in 2023) worth of acoustical machinery and other instruments.

The equipment used in these experiments included: a Western Electric oscillograph, an acoustic spectrometer designed and built by the Bell Telephone Laboratories, a high-speed level recorder, a crystal analyzer, a spirometer, sound filters, high-speed cameras and X-ray motion-picture machines.

- A Western Electric oscillograph was used for the making of sound analyses.
- An acoustic spectrometer gave a qualitative reading of the sound spectrum.
- A crystal analyzer gave an accurate quantitative reading.
- A high-speed level recorder traced onto a moving ticker tape of paper every slight change in intensity.

The outcomes of these investigations were summed up in graphed pitch-intensity readings. The readings could be used to mark the state of certain elements of singer's voice at any time and to map its progress or other changes while under technical training. Such tests were carried out on hundreds of singers, including the Metropolitan Opera's top two tenors—Giovanni Martinelli and Lauritz Melchior. An account of this methodology and of the two tenor's particular tests is found in Appendix I, chapter one of The Science of Voice.

Additional equipment such as a spirometer, sound filters, high-speed cameras and X-ray motion picture machines were used demonstrate other physiological behaviors in singing, e.g. that only the edges of the vocal cords vibrate for pure falsetto and that the entire cords vibrate for the pure lower register.

One of Stanley's closest friends and working partners—and a co-author of The Science of Voice—was Stanley SA Watkins, an engineer who worked for Western Electric (later Bell Telephone) on hearing aids, microphones, and sound recording and was the chief engineer in the creation of the first commercial sound picture recording system, Vitaphone and later of the Voder.

== Publications ==
December 1924 saw the publication of Stanley's first scientific paper, “Scientific Tests of Good and Bad Singers,” which was written in collaboration with Sheldon and appeared in Scientific American. His three major published works, with later amendments and appendices, were:

- The Science of Voice. Carl Fischer, Inc., 1929. Editions in 1932, 1939, 1948, and 1959.
- The Voice — Its Production and Reproduction. Pitman Publishing Corporation, 1933.
- Your Voice: Applied Science of Vocal Art. Pitman, 1945. Editions in 1950 and 1957.

== Notes ==
Malcolm Sterling Mackinlay: Garcia the centenarian and his times
