= José Serebrier =

Uruguayan conductor and composer (born 1938)

Serebrier in 1969

José Serebrier (born 3 December 1938) is a Uruguayan conductor and composer. He is one of the most recorded conductors of his generation.

== Early life ==
Serebrier was born in Montevideo to Russian and Polish parents of Jewish extraction. He first conducted an orchestra at the age of eleven, while at school. The school orchestra toured the country, which meant he was able to notch up over one hundred performances within four years. He graduated from the Municipal School of Music in Montevideo at fifteen, having studied violin, solfege, and Latin American folklore. Subsequently, he studied counterpoint, fugue, composition and conducting with Guido Santórsola, and piano with his wife, Sarah Bourdillon Santórsola. The National Orchestra, known as SODRE, announced a composition contest. Within two weeks, Serebrier had composed his "Legend of Faust" overture. It won. To his huge disappointment he was not allowed to conduct it, because he was only fifteen. The premiere was given to Eleazar de Carvalho, who later that same year became his conducting teacher at Tanglewood, the Boston Symphony Orchestra's summer home.

He was awarded a United States State Department Fellowship to study at the Curtis Institute of Music, with Vittorio Giannini. Later he studied with Aaron Copland at Tanglewood, and with Pierre Monteux. His first symphony, written at the age of 17, was premiered by Leopold Stokowski, as the last minute substitute for the Ives Fourth Symphony, which proved still unplayable at the time. The recording of that Stokowski performance was released on CD in 2010. Another recording of this work was released by Naxos, also in 2010, with the composer conducting the Bournemouth Symphony Orchestra.

== Conducting ==
Serebrier's New York conducting debut with the American Symphony Orchestra was at Carnegie Hall in 1965. At the time, Ives' Fourth Symphony had been considered so difficult that it was performed using three conductors at its premiere in 1965, almost 50 years after its composition. Stokowski, Serebrier and David Katz performed it this way. A few years later Serebrier conducted it on his own. He made his recording debut with the work, and Hi-Fi News and Record Review wrote of it: "This ... must surely count as one of the great achievements of the gramophone".

He has had very many conducting posts, including principal guest conductor of the Adelaide Symphony Orchestra during the 1982–83 season. He was offered the post of Chief Conductor, but since he doesn't accept such positions he agreed to the title of Principal Guest Conductor. Leopold Stokowski named Serebrier Associate Conductor of the American Symphony Orchestra, a post he held for five years until going to Cleveland at George Szell's invitation.

Serebrier married American soprano Carole Farley in 1969. They have made a number of recordings together.

Serebrier's Third Symphony and his "Fantasia for strings" are amongst his most popular works. His style is energetic, colourful and melodic. One of his most unusual works is "Passacaglia and Perpetuum Mobile for accordion and chamber orchestra". His music is published mainly by Peermusic New York and Hamburg, and also by Peters Edition, Universal Edition Vienna, Hal Leonard, Kalmus, Boosey & Hawkes. All of his works have been recorded on various labels. In 2012, BIS Records released Serebrier's Flute Concerto with Tango, which they commissioned for flutist Sharon Bezaly.

Serebrier tours the world with a number of orchestras. He has made several tours with the Russian National Orchestra, to South America and China. His first international tour was with the Juilliard Orchestra to 17 countries in Latin America. He has toured with the Pittsburgh Symphony, Royal Philharmonic Orchestra, Philharmonia Orchestra, The Orchestra of the Americas, Scottish Chamber Orchestra, and numerous others.

== Awards ==
Serebrier has received 37 nominations for Grammy Awards and won 8 Grammys. In 1976 he won the Ditson Conductor's Award for commitment to American music. He won the Latin Grammy Awards of 2004 Best Classical Album for his own work, the "Carmen Symphony". In the Latin Grammy Awards of 2005 he was a nominee, for Glazunov's 5th Symphony.

== Selected compositions ==
- 1948 Sonata for violin solo, Op. 1
- 1952 Elegy for strings
- 1955 Sonata for Viola Alone
- 1955 Quartet for Saxophones
- 1955 Song of Destiny for choir a capella
- 1956 "Pequeña Música" for woodwind quintet
- 1956 Vocalise for choir a capella
- 1956 Song without name or words No. 1
- 1956 Symphony No. 1, in one movement
- 1957 Momento Psicológico for trumpet & orchestra
- 1957 Suite Canina (Canine Suite) for woodwind trio
- 1958 Song without name or words No. 2
- 1958 Piano Sonata
- 1958 Poema Elegaico for orchestra
- 1958 Partita (Symphony No. 2)
- 1960 Fantasia for strings
- 1962 "Colores Mágicos" Concerto for harp and chamber orchestra
- 1963 Variations on a Theme from Childhood, for trombone (or bassoon) & strings
- 1963 Symphony for Percussion (5 players)
- 1965 Preludio Fantastico & Danza Mágica for 5 percussionists
- 1965 Music for the film "The Star Wagon" with Dustin Hoffman
- 1965 Passacaglia & Perpetuum Moboile, for solo accordion
- 1965 "Six on TV" for wind quintet and 1 percussionist
- 1966 Passacaglia and Perpetuum Mobile, for accordion & chamber orchestra
- 1966 Manitowabing, for flute and oboe
- 1966 Ad dusk, in shadows for solo flute
- 1967 "12 X 12" for winds, brass and percussion
- 1968 “ Erotica” for woodwind quintet and voice
- 1973 Seis por Television (6 for television)
- 1974 "Nueve" Concerto for double bass and chamber orchestra
- 1986 George and Muriel, for double bass, double bass choir & chorus
- 1991 Dorothy and Carmine!, for flute & strings
- 1998 Violin Concerto "Winter"
- 1999 Winterreise for orchestra
- 2003 Symphony No. 3 for string orchestra & soprano ("Symphonie mystique")
- 2009 Flute Concerto with Tango, for flute and string orchestra
