= Robert Merrill =

Opera singer and actor (1917–2004)

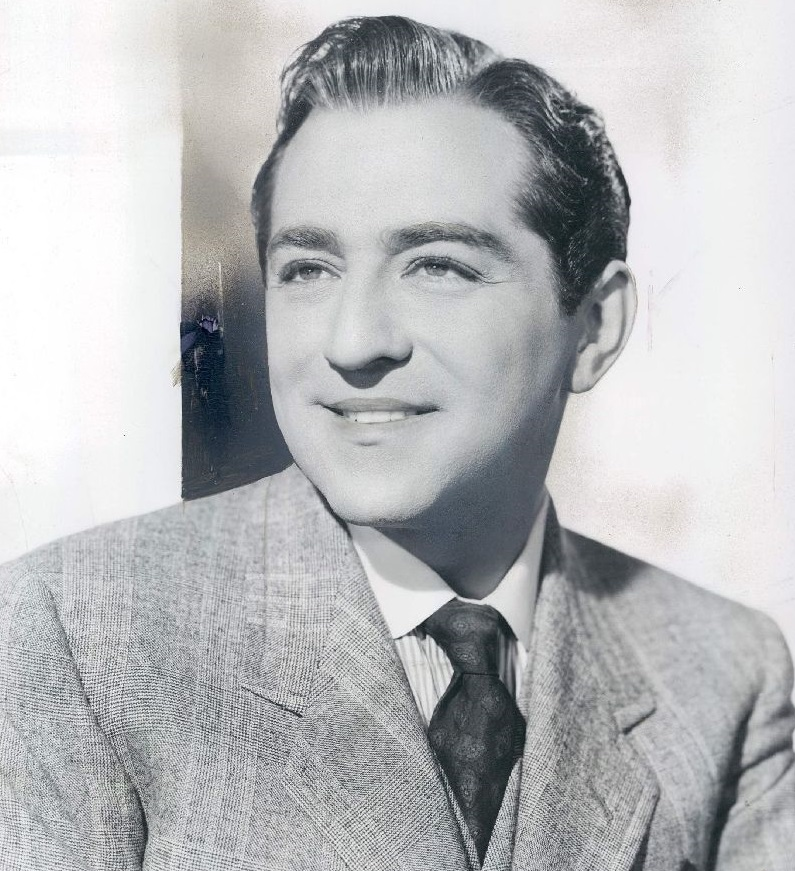
- Merrill in the 1940s

Background information
- Also known as: Robert Merrill; Morris Miller
- Born: Moishe Miller; June 4, 1917; Brooklyn, New York, US
- Died: October 23, 2004 (aged 87) New Rochelle, New York, US
- Genres: Opera; Musical theatre
- Occupations: Singer; Actor
- Instruments: Voice (baritone)
- Formerly of: Metropolitan Opera

Robert Merrill (June 4, 1917 – October 23, 2004) was an American operatic baritone and actor, who was also active in the musical theatre circuit. He received the National Medal of Arts in 1993.

== Early life ==
Merrill was born Moishe Miller, later known as Morris Miller, in the Williamsburg section of Brooklyn, New York. He was the son of tailor Abraham Miller, originally Milstein, and his wife, Lillian (née Balaban), Jewish immigrants from Pultusk, Poland, near Warsaw. His paternal grandparents were Berl Milstein and Chana (née Mlawski), both from Pultusk, Poland.

His mother claimed to have had an operatic and concert career in Poland (a fact denied by her son in his biographies) and encouraged her son to have early voice training: he had a stutter, which wasn't apparent when singing. Merrill was inspired to pursue professional singing lessons when he saw the baritone Richard Bonelli singing Count Di Luna in a performance of Il Trovatore at the Metropolitan Opera, and paid for them with money earned as a semi-professional pitcher.

== Radio and recordings ==
In his early radio appearances as a crooner he was sometimes billed as Merrill Miller. While singing at bar mitzvahs and weddings and Borscht Belt resorts, he met an agent, Moe Gale, who found him work at Radio City Music Hall and with the NBC Symphony Orchestra, conducted by Arturo Toscanini. With Toscanini conducting, he eventually sang in two of the maestro's NBC Symphony broadcasts of famous operas, La traviata (with Licia Albanese, in 1946), and Un ballo in maschera (with Herva Nelli, in 1954). Both of those operas were recorded and later released on both LP and CD by RCA Victor. His ranking as an important NBC performer is evidenced by his inclusion in NBC's 1947 promotional book, NBC Parade of Stars: As Heard Over Your Favorite NBC Station, displaying Sam Berman's caricatures of leading NBC personalities.

Merrill's 1944 operatic debut was in Verdi's Aida at Newark, New Jersey, with the famous tenor Giovanni Martinelli, then in the later stages of his long operatic career. Merrill, who had continued his vocal studies under Samuel Margolis, made his debut at the Metropolitan Opera as winner of the Metropolitan Opera Auditions of the Air in 1945, as Germont in La Traviata. Also in 1945, Merrill recorded a 78 rpm album set with Jeanette MacDonald, featuring selections from the operetta Up in Central Park; MacDonald and Merrill sang two duets together on this album.

External audio
- Robert Merrill as Escamillo in Georges Bizet's opera Carmen with Fritz Reiner conducting the RCA Victor Orchestra and Jan Peerce, Risë Stevens and Licia Albanese in 1951

In 1951, Merrill recorded a series of operatic duets with the Swedish tenor Jussi Björling for RCA Victor, including a world-renowned recording of "Au fond du temple saint" from the opera Les pêcheurs de perles by Georges Bizet. That same year he participated in another celebrated RCA Victor recording, Bizet's Carmen with Risë Stevens and Jan Peerce, conducted by Fritz Reiner; he also later sang the same role in the Herbert von Karajan recording with Leontyne Price and Franco Corelli. In 1952 Merrill, Björling, and Victoria de los Ángeles made a widely admired RCA Victor recording of Puccini's La Bohème, conducted by Sir Thomas Beecham. In 1953, Merrill, Björling, de los Angeles and Zinka Milanov recorded the complete Pagliacci and Cavalleria Rusticana. In addition to his operatic recordings, he sang the baritone solos in the Leonard Bernstein recording of Ernest Bloch's Avodat Hakodesh.

== Metropolitan Opera ==
His role in the musical comedy film Aaron Slick from Punkin Crick (1952) led to a conflict with Sir Rudolf Bing and a brief departure from the Met in 1951. Merrill sang many different baritone roles, and after the on-stage death of the celebrated Leonard Warren in 1960, became the Met's principal baritone, sharing that position in a few years with Cornell MacNeil. In the late 1950s and early 1960s, he appeared under the direction of Alfredo Antonini in performances of arias from the Italian operatic repertoire for the open air Italian Night concert series at Lewisohn Stadium in New York City.

He was described by Time as "one of the Met's best baritones." An early (1947) review of Il Trovatore was fairly typical of those Merrill's performances elicited throughout his career - copious praise for the purely vocal aspects, some reservations about the acting and/or characterization. "Mr. Merrill, the owner of a voice whose opulence needs little comment, invested his role with great tonal warmth, although his stage bearing was at times a little stiff." A 1952 of his first Met Rigoletto, for example, said, "Mr. Merrill, in the future, is quite likely to make Rigoletto one of his outstanding roles. He has the voice for it - a ringing baritone which sounds now bigger than it has on previous occasions, and his acting capacities are flexible enough to allow for considerable advance in the matter of characterization. At the present, however, Mr. Merrill has barely touched on the wealth of shading available to any and all Rigoletto singers." On the other hand, a review that year of his Amonasro stated that Merrill "presented an imposing figure and built the struggle with Aida in the Nile scene to an exciting climax." Opera magazine called a 1954 performance of his in The Barber of Seville "by all odds the most insensitive impersonation of the season," accusing him of "loud, coarse sounds" and "no grace, no charm, as he butchered the text and galumphed around the stage". By contrast, Olin Downes, reviewing the same run of performances, referred to an "all star cast, one that would have not have paled by comparison with other historic interpretations of the leading roles in Metropolitan history... [T]he whole cast was masterful, vocally admirable, expert, adroit, and very funny and never cheap or merely farcical in its witty stage business." Downes further stated that Merrill's entrance area was "delivered with uncommon dash and bravura."

The accolades for Merrill's voice - and, sometimes, his acting - continued into the 1960s. Reviews of a 1963 Otello, for example, said, "There was Robert Merrill, singing his first Metropolitan Iago with velvety smooth tones but sinister gestures and sly insinuations." and "Robert Merrill as Iago turned in a splendid performance both as regards singing and acting. He was not, to be sure, the totally evil, 110 per cent wicked Iago that one sometimes sees in this role, and that was all to the good. He portrayed a person, not a caricature. His diction, so important in this role, was the best of the evening." Harold C. Schonberg, writing about a 1969 Aida, wrote that "Robert Merrill all but shattered the chandeliers at his entrance as Amonasro." As late as 1971, a review of La Forza del Destino commented that Merrill "delivered [his] customary quality."

The recordings Merrill made in his vocal prime continue to garner acclaim for their vocalism, if not dramatic intensity or nuance. A 2010 review in Classics Today of a group of 1950 recordings said, "In these benighted times when the Italian repertory is starved for baritones worth hearing, the memory of Robert Merrill’s big voice and shining timbre takes on a golden glow... [C]ritics clucked that while he had a beautiful voice–full, resonant, ringing high notes, and the timbre for Verdi roles–he wasn’t a profound interpreter... But what wouldn’t we give to hear [Merrill's repertoire] sung today in such opulent tone and immaculate style!" Ralph Moore, in a survey of Rigoletto recordings, wrote about the 1956 version with Merrill and Björling, "Merrill displays one of the richest, most resonant baritones ever to grace the stage and does not here seem susceptible to the accusation sometimes made against him that he is dramatically inert; his palpable grief during 'Ah! Deh non parlare al misero' is very touching."

== Later career ==
Merrill appeared on The Voice of Firestone with Joanne Hill.

Merrill also continued to perform on radio and television, in nightclubs and recitals. In 1973, Merrill teamed up with Richard Tucker to present a concert at Carnegie Hall—a first for the two "vocal supermen" (as one critic dubbed them), and a first "for the demanding New York public and critics," Merrill recalled. The event marked a precedent that eventually led to the "Three Tenors" concerts many years later. Merrill retired from the Met in 1976. In 1977, he appeared on the TV special "Sinatra & Friends," soloing "If I Were A Rich Man" and performing "The Oldest Established Permanent Floating Crap Game in New York" with Frank Sinatra and Dean Martin. For many years, he led services, often in Borscht Belt hotels, on Rosh Hashana and Yom Kippur.

In honor of Merrill's vast influence on American vocal music, on February 16, 1981, he was awarded the prestigious University of Pennsylvania Glee Club Award of Merit.

First awarded in 1964, the Award of Merit honors an individual that has "made a significant contribution to the world of music and helped to create a climate in which our talents may find valid expression."

In 1996, at a reception at Lincoln Center, Merrill was presented with The Lawrence Tibbett Award from the AGMA Relief Fund, honoring his fifty years of professional achievement and dedication to colleagues. The AGMA Relief Fund, award sponsor, provides financial assistance and support services to classical performing artists in need.

== Sporting events ==
Relatively late in his singing career, Merrill also became known for singing "The Star-Spangled Banner" at Yankee Stadium and Giants Stadium. He first sang the national anthem to open the 1967 Major League Baseball season, and it became a tradition for the New York Yankees to bring him back each year on Opening Day and special occasions. He sang at various Old Timer's Days (wearing his own pinstriped Yankee uniform with the number "1 1/2" on the back) and the emotional pre-game ceremony in memory of Thurman Munson at Yankee Stadium on August 3, 1979, the day after the catcher died in a plane crash. Merrill also sang at one World Series game in each year the Yankees played the Fall Classic at the stadium, starting in 1976. A recorded Merrill version is still sometimes used at Yankee Stadium, almost every game. In 2021, the Yankees replaced the live organ version of "God Bless America" that had played for almost two years with Merrill's cover.

Merrill preferred a traditional approach to the song, devoid of additional ornamentation, as he explained to Newsday in 2000, "When you sing the anthem, there's a legitimacy to it. I'm extremely bothered by these different interpretations of it." Merrill appeared opposite Adam Sandler in a scene singing the national anthem, in the 2003 film Anger Management. Merrill joked that an entire generation of people know him as "The 'Say-Can-You-See' guy!" (Agmazine, April 1996).

== Personal life ==
While there has been dispute regarding his birth year (some claim he was born in 1919), the Social Security Death Index, his family, and his gravestone state that he was born in 1917.

Merrill married soprano Roberta Peters in 1952; however, they divorced shortly afterwards. He had two children with his second wife, Marion Machno, a pianist. Merrill liked to play golf and was a member of the Westchester Country Club in Rye, New York, for many years.

He wrote two books of memoirs, Once More from the Beginning (1965) and Between Acts (1976), and he co-authored a novel, The Divas (1978).

Merrill toured all over the world with his arranger and conductor, Angelo DiPippo, who wrote most of his act and performed at concert halls throughout the world.

== Death ==
Merrill died on October 23, 2004, at his home in New Rochelle, New York, at age 87. He is interred at the Sharon Gardens Cemetery in Valhalla, New York, which is the Jewish division of Kensico Cemetery. His headstone features an opera curtain that has been drawn open.

His epitaph states: "Like a bursting celestial star, he showered his family and the world with love, joy, and beauty. Encore please."

== Performances with the Metropolitan Opera ==
Robert Merrill sang 789 performances with the Metropolitan Opera in the following 21 roles:

Composer	Opera	Role	First performance	Last performance	Total performances
Verdi	La traviata	Germont	1945-12-15	1976-03-15	132
Donizetti	Lucia di Lammermoor	Enrico	1945-12-29	1965-01-23	16
Bizet	Carmen	Escamillo	1946-01-07	1972-01-04	81
Mussorgsky	Boris Godunov	Shchelkalov	1946-11-21	1947-04-21	5
Gounod	Faust	Valentin	1946-12-23	1972-05-04	48
Verdi	Aida	Amonasro	1947-01-11	1973-06-01	72
Rossini	Il Barbiere di Siviglia	Figaro	1947-11-15	1966-06-04	46
Verdi	Il trovatore	Count di Luna	1947-12-11	1973-05-30	73
Saint-Saëns	Samson et Dalila	High Priest	1949-11-26	1950-04-30	10
Verdi	Don Carlo	Rodrigo	1950-11-06	1972-06-21	51
Leoncavallo	Pagliacci	Silvio	1951-02-09	1951-02-09	1
Leoncavallo	Pagliacci	Tonio	1952-03-14	1964-04-02	22
Verdi	Rigoletto	Rigoletto	1952-11-15	1972-02-05	56
Puccini	La bohème	Marcello	1952-12-27	1954-02-01	10
Verdi	Un ballo in maschera	Renato	1955-02-26	1976-05-29	56
Donizetti	Don Pasquale	Malatesta	1956-04-09	1956-12-10	8
Ponchielli	La Gioconda	Barnaba	1958-12-11	1962-04-16	13
Verdi	La forza del destino	Don Carlo	1961-12-12	1972-06-09	33
Giordano	Andrea Chénier	Carlo Gérard	1962-10-15	1966-03-22	7
Verdi	Otello	Iago	1963-03-10	1965-05-07	18
Puccini	Tosca	Scarpia	1964-10-23	1974-12-09	11

== Studio recordings ==
External audio
- You may hear Robert Merrill performing Verdi's "La Traviata" with Richard Tucker, Anna Moffo and the Rome Opera Orchestra conducted by Fernando Previtali in 1961; Here on Archive.org

Robert Merrill made at least 25 studio recordings of complete operas, including two Toscanini radio broadcasts:

Composer	Opera	Role	Date
Bizet	Carmen	Escamillo	1951, 1963
Donizetti	Lucia di Lammermoor	Enrico	1961
Leoncavallo	Pagliacci	Silvio	1953
Leoncavallo	Pagliacci	Tonio	1967
Mascagni	Cavalleria rusticana	Alfio	1953
Ponchielli	La Gioconda	Barnaba	1967
Puccini	La bohème	Marcello	1956, 1961
Puccini	Manon Lescaut	Lescaut	1954
Puccini	Il tabarro	Michele	1962
Rossini	Il barbiere di Siviglia	Figaro	1958
Straus	Der tapfere Soldat	Bumerli	1952
Verdi	Aida	Amonasro	1961
Verdi	Un ballo in maschera	Renato	1946, 1966
Verdi	Falstaff	Ford	1963
Verdi	La forza del destino	Don Carlo	1964
Verdi	Rigoletto	Rigoletto	1956, 1963
Verdi	La traviata	Germont	1946, 1960, 1962
Verdi	Il trovatore	Conte di Luna	1964

== See also ==
- A Salute to American Music (Richard Tucker Music Foundation Gala XVI, 1991)

== Listen to ==
- WNYC Soundcheck: Robert Merrill Remembered (October 26, 2004)
