= Povla Frijsh =

Danish voice teacher and soprano

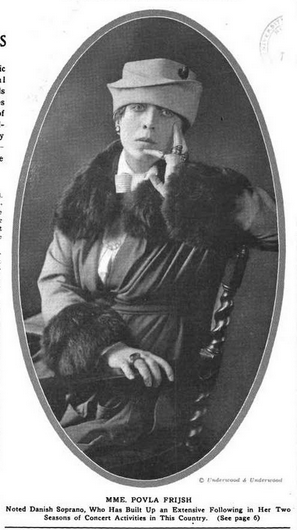
Povla Frijsh, from a 1917 publication

Povla Frijsh (3 August 1881 – 10 July 1960) was a Danish classical soprano and voice teacher.

== Life ==
Frijsh was born on the island of Ærø in Denmark in 1881. She studied with Ove Christensen in Denmark and Jean Périer in Paris.

She mainly sang in concerts and recitals; although she did make a few opera appearances at the Paris Opera and the Royal Danish Theatre. She toured with artists including Raoul Pugno, Pablo Casals, and Jacques Thibaud. She was a champion of contemporary classical music, and was an important exponent of the works of Virgil Thomson, Randall Thompson, Francis Poulenc, Rebecca Clarke, and Samuel Barber. After a 49-year-long performance career, she retired from singing in 1947. Her notable pupils included Adele Addison, Jean Kraft, and Cornelius L. Reid.

She died in Blue Hill, Maine, in 1960.
