= William Brown (tenor) =

American opera singer

William Brown (March 29, 1938, Jackson, Mississippi – October 20, 2004, Jacksonville, Florida) was an American operatic tenor, a founding member of the Center for Black Music Repertory Ensemble and a Distinguished Professor of Voice at the University of North Florida.

Brown earned a Bachelor of Music degree from Jackson State University in 1960 and a Masters of Music degree from the Jacobs School of Music at Indiana University in 1962. He later earned a doctorate of music from the Peabody Institute in 1971. From 1962 to 1966, he was a soloist with the United States Navy Band and Choir, with whom he performed for Presidents John F. Kennedy and Lyndon B. Johnson.

In 1967, he made his professional opera debut as Spalanzani in The Tales of Hoffmann with the Baltimore Opera Company. That same year, replacing an ailing Plácido Domingo, he made his New York City debut as Kalaf in Ferruccio Busoni's Turandot with The Little Orchestra Society at Avery Fisher Hall. He also starred as the Angel in the world premiere of John La Montaine's pageant opera The Sheparde's Playe, which was recorded for television and broadcast nationally in the United States on ABC. In 1968, he created the role of Feste in the world premiere of David Amram's Twelfth Night at the Lake George Opera, and he made his debut at the New York City Opera as Lieutenant Jean l'Aiglon in the world premiere of Hugo Weisgall's Nine Rivers from Jordan.

In 1970, Brown sang the role of Don Ottavio in Wolfgang Amadeus Mozart's Don Giovanni at the Connecticut Opera. In 1971, he portrayed the role of Lucano in Claudio Monteverdi's L'incoronazione di Poppea with the Opera Orchestra of New York under conductor Eve Queler. He returned to the Baltimore Opera in 1972 to perform the role of Belmonte in Mozart's Die Entführung aus dem Serail. In 1977, he sang the role of Nate in the New York premiere of William Grant Still's Highway 1 U.S.A. for the inaugural production of Opera Ebony. That same year, he made his debut with the New York Philharmonic, singing in a concert of works written entirely by African-American composers. In 1981, he performed the role of Thompson St. Chavez in Virgil Thomson's Four Saints in Three Acts at Carnegie Hall, a role which he recorded with Nonesuch Records in 1982. In 1985, he starred in the world premiere of Dorothy Rudd Moore's opera, Frederick Douglass, at Aaron Davis Hall. In 1991, he was the recipient of the North Carolina Award.

From 1972 until his death 32 years later, Brown was a professor of voice at the University of North Florida. He had previously taught at Florida Presbyterian College from 1970 to 1972. Brown died in 2004 at the age of 66 in Jacksonville, Florida.
