= Eileen Strempel =

American opera singer

Eileen Strempel (born July 13, 1967) is an operatic soprano, author, higher education policy expert, and academic from Syracuse, New York, who was the inaugural dean of the Herb Alpert School of Music at University of California, Los Angeles. Strempel’s scholarly work advocates for college transfer students—and both access to and support for higher education—and the works of historically underrepresented composers.

== Background and education ==
A trained vocalist, Strempel received her bachelor’s degree in music from the Eastman School of Music and her master’s degree and doctorate in music from Indiana University School of Music, where she completed a dissertation entitled “The Gendered Salon in Late Nineteenth-century Paris: The Works of Marie Grandval.”

== Career ==
Strempel was appointed inaugural dean of the UCLA Herb Alpert School of Music in 2019. In 2021, she was named among “The Top Ten Deans in U.S. Colleges and Universities.” A cross-institutional leader at UCLA, she served as Chair of the Chancellor’s Council for the Arts (currently engaged in 2028 Olympics planning, as UCLA is the site of the Athlete’s Village) and co-Chair of the Professional Deans Council.

Prior to joining UCLA, she served as the senior vice provost for academic affairs at the University of Cincinnati. She also held a variety of roles at Syracuse University over a seventeen-year span, including Assistant Vice President for Academic Advancement. During her time at Syracuse, she was also awarded a Kauffman Foundation eProfessorship and an American Council on Education fellowship, which she served at Colgate University. She served as the Secretary and President-Elect on the Board of Directors for the International Council for Arts Deans.

As a scholar, Strempel’s focus is on the music of women composers. Her work includes recordings, commissions, articles, and edited volumes that examine the political, social, and musical contexts of female composers. She has been published in Classical Singer magazine; Journal of Singing; Reader's Guide to Music: History, Criticism, Theory; Journal of the International Alliance for Women in Music; and Teaching Music.

Strempel has also published extensively on higher education. With Stephen J. Handel, she is the co-author of Beyond Free College: Making Higher Education Work for 21st Century Students, a book focused on higher education public policy. This work is a follow-up to their co-edited, two-volume set Transfer and Transformation: Fostering Transfer Student Success.

As a performer, Strempel has appeared with the Bolshoi Opera, Wolf Trap Opera and Opera Theatre St. Louis, as well as with the Chautauqua, Skaneateles and Berkeley Early Music festivals. Her roles included Violetta in La Traviata, Gilda in Rigoletto and the title role in Lucia di Lammermoor. She has been featured on eight recordings, including love lies bleeding: songs by Libby Larsen, prepared with the composer.

== Personal life ==
Strempel is married to musicologist Stephen Meyer and has two sons.

== Publications ==
- Beyond Free College: Making Higher Education Work for 21st Century Students. Co-author with Stephen Handel. Rowman & Littlefield Press, 2021. ISBN 978-1475848656
- Transition and Transformation: New Research Fostering Transfer Student Success. Co-editor with Stephen Handel. University Press of North Georgia, 2018. ISBN 978-1940771472
- Transition and Transformation: Fostering Transfer Student Success. Co-editor with Stephen Handel. University Press of North Georgia, 2016. ISBN 978-1940771250

== Sources ==
- Dennison, Leah, "Poetry in Motion", Syracuse New Times, Mar 24, 2010
- Jahier, Josephine and Swift, Eileen, "Have Voice, Will Travel", Newsday, September 20, 1992, p. 3
- Kaufman, Marjorie, "Soprano Excites the World's Opera Stages", The New York Times, May 2, 1993
- Syracuse University, Department of Art & Music Histories, Eileen Strempel
