= Adele Addison =

American lyric soprano (born 1925)

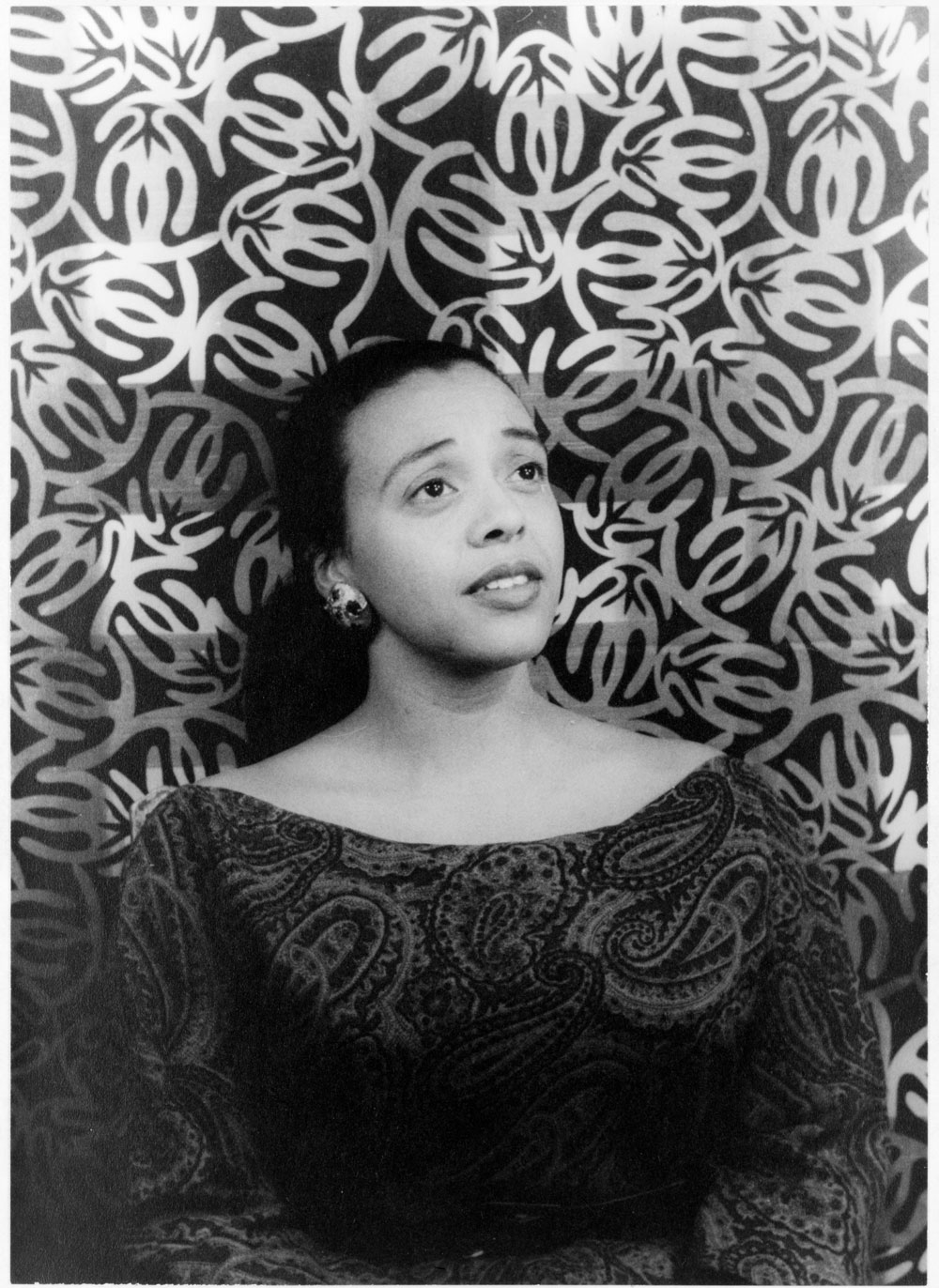
- Adele Addison in 1955 (photographed by Carl Van Vechten)

Background information
- Born: July 24, 1925 (age 101); New York, U.S.
- Origin: Springfield, Massachusetts, U.S.
- Genre: Opera
- Occupations: Singer; Lyric soprano
- Years active: 1948–1960s

Adele Addison (born July 24, 1925) is an American lyric soprano who was a figure in the classical music world during the 1950s and 1960s. Although she did appear in several operas, Addison spent most of her career performing in recital and concert. Her performances spanned a wide array of literature from the Baroque period to contemporary compositions. She is best remembered today as the singing voice for Bess (played by Dorothy Dandridge) in the 1959 movie, Porgy and Bess. Known for her polished and fluent tone, Addison made a desirable Baroque vocal artist. She can be heard on numerous recordings, of which her Baroque performances are perhaps her best work. Many of her recordings were made with the New York Philharmonic under the baton of Leonard Bernstein.

== Early life and education ==
Addison, who is African-American, was born on July 24, 1925, in New York City, moving to Springfield, Massachusetts, as a child.

Addison began dedicated vocal studies as a teenager and, following high school, she won a scholarship to study at the Westminster Choir College in Princeton, New Jersey. Further scholarships enabled her to pursue graduate studies at Princeton University and attend summer sessions at the Berkshire Music Center (now the Tanglewood Music Center), where she studied with Boris Goldovsky.

== Career ==
Addison made her professional recital debut in Boston, in 1948 while still a student at Princeton. Following graduation she moved to New York City to pursue a career as a classical soprano. Of her 1952 New York City recital debut The New York Times wrote, "The recital season reached a high point last night when Adele Addison, soprano from Springfield, Massachusetts, made her debut in Town Hall." Following her New York debut, she continued to study voice at the Juilliard School with Beverley Peck Johnson and with Povla Frijsh. In 1955 she made her New York City Opera debut as Mimi in Puccini's La bohème. The New York Post said the following of her debut, "Adele Addison is about the most appealing interpreter of the little Parisian seamstress yet to appear on the City Center stage. Small, frail looking, and pretty, Miss Addison enhanced these assets by acting and singing with moving poignancy and sincerity." That same year, Addison was invited by Aaron Copland to perform the world premiere of his Dirge In Woods at a concert sponsored by the League of Composers.

Although Addison was offered more opera roles with several companies, she did not appear in many more opera productions as she preferred to sing in recital and on the concert stage. She did appear in a few more productions with the New York City Opera, the Philadelphia Lyric Opera Company, and the New England Opera Theatre. Her other opera roles included the title role in Handel's Acis and Galatea, Liù in Puccini's Turandot, Gilda in Verdi's Rigoletto, Micaela in Bizet's Carmen, Fiordiligi in Mozart's Così fan tutte, and Nannetta in Verdi's Falstaff among others. In 1959, Addison sang the role of Bess in the film version of Gershwin's Porgy and Bess. The role was initially supposed to be sung by Urylee Leonardos, but apparently Leonardos' voice sounded too shrill when recorded so they replaced her with Addison at the last minute. In a 1996 Opera News interview she said, "Today, young singers are almost forced to make a choice, because they are counseled that becoming established in opera is the way to make a career in music. I never had to make a choice. I loved the song repertoire from the start, and as I began to sing, for even the smallest ladies' clubs, etc., those inviting me expected and accepted that.... Even as the years passed, and I sang all the rest of the repertoire – opera, oratorio, chamber music, etc. – the first love remained.... My curiosity, joy and love for song never changed. It still has not."

Addison made numerous appearances with major orchestras, such as the Boston Symphony Orchestra, the Hollywood Bowl Orchestra, and the Cleveland Orchestra. In 1961 she was chosen by Charles Münch as the soprano soloist in the World premiere of Francis Poulenc's Gloria with the Boston Symphony Orchestra. She became a favorite of Bernstein and the two collaborated frequently, including on a number of recordings. In 1961 he invited her to sing the soprano solos in the world premiere of Lukas Foss' Time Cycle' with the New York Philharmonic. She performed the work again later that year with Izler Solomon and the Indianapolis Symphony Orchestra. She also sang under Bernstein for the opening of Lincoln Center's Philharmonica Hall (now Avery Fisher Hall).

Other noted performances by Addison include the world premiere of Lester Trimble's Canterbury Tales and her interpretation of Debussy's L'Enfant prodigue.

Towards the late 1960s, Addison's performing career began to slow down as she focused more on teaching. Although retired now, she taught voice on the collegiate level for more than thirtyfive years. She has been a voice teacher for SUNY at Stony Brook, Eastman School of Music and Aspen Music Festival and School. For many years, she was also on the faculty, serving for a time as Chair, of the Voice Department at the Manhattan School of Music, which awarded her an honorary doctorate in 2001. Many of her students, such as Dawn Upshaw, have gone on to have successful careers. Addison once said, "What I try to pass on to my own students at the Manhattan School of Music is to make them aware of their own abilities, to know how much they need to know in order to be a singing musician."

== Personal life ==
In 1958, Addison married Norman Berger, a senior research scientist and clinical professor of prosthetics-orthotics education in the Department of Rehabilitation Medicine at New York University. Their 47-year marriage lasted until Berger's death in 2005. The Boston Symphony Orchestra congratulated Addison in 2025 on her 100th birthday.

== Opera and oratorio roles ==
- Acis, Acis and Galatea (Handel)
- Bess, Porgy and Bess (Gershwin)
- Esther, Esther (Handel)
- Fiordiligi, Così fan tutte (Mozart)
- Gilda, Rigoletto (Verdi)
- Il Pensieroso, L'Allegro, il Penseroso ed il Moderato (Handel)
- Liù, Turandot (Puccini)
- Micaela, Carmen (Bizet)
- Mimì, La bohème (Puccini)
- Nannetta, Falstaff (Verdi)

== Recordings ==
- Bach's Mass in B minor with Robert Shaw and the Robert Shaw Chorale and Orchestra. (UPC: 090266352920)
- Bach's St Matthew Passion with Leonard Bernstein and the New York Philharmonic Orchestra. (UPC: 074646072721)
- Beethoven's Symphony No. 9 with the Cleveland Orchestra and George Szell. (UPC: 5099751850823)
- Aaron Copland's Poems of Emily Dickinson, song cycle for voice and piano with Copland on piano. (UPC: 696998932920)
- Debussy's The Martyrdom of St. Sebastian with Leonard Bernstein and the New York Philharmonic Orchestra. (ASIN: B000009CYJ)
- Lukas Foss' Time Cycle with Leonard Bernstein and the New York Philharmonic Orchestra. (ASIN: B0000029XZ)
- Gershwin's Porgy and Bess (1959 Film Soundtrack) (ASIN: B00002MY3V)
- Handel's Messiah with Leonard Bernstein, the New York Philharmonic Orchestra, and the Westminster Choir. (UPC: 074646020524)
- Handel's Ode for St. Cecilia's Day with Leonard Bernstein and the New York Philharmonic Orchestra. (ASIN: B00000J27Q)
- Noël Lee's Five Songs on poetry by Federico García Lorca and Marc Bucci's "Summer Aria" and "Spring Aria".
- Mahler's Symphony No. 8 with Leonard Bernstein and the New York Philharmonic Orchestra. (UPC: 696998949928)
- Ralph Vaughan Williams's Serenade to Music with Leonard Bernstein and the New York Philharmonic Orchestra. (ASIN: B00003XAH5)
