= Blake Stern =

American tenor

Blake Stern (June 25, 1917 – December 22, 1987) was an American tenor, best known as an oratorio singer, and a professor emeritus of music at Yale University, where he taught voice.

He was born in Logan, Iowa. A graduate of Grinnell College in 1940, he was an intelligence officer in the US Navy during World War II. After the war, he enrolled at Juilliard School in New York City before becoming a teacher at the Yale faculty for 32 years. One of his pupils was tenor John Stewart. During his career he performed at venues such as Carnegie Hall and toured the world.
