= Ode for St Cecilia's Day =

Ode for St Cecilia's Day are odes for St Cecilia the patron saint of music and may refer to musical works by:

- Henry Purcell
  - Welcome to all the pleasures
  - Hail! Bright Cecilia
- George Frederic Handel
  - Ode for St. Cecilia's Day, setting a poem by John Dryden
