= Lamperti =

Lamperti is the surname of an Italian family of musicians.

- Francesco Lamperti (1811–1892), Italian voice teacher
- Giovanni Battista Lamperti (1839–1910), Italian voice teacher, son of Francesco
