= Julian Patrick =

American opera singer (1927–2009)

Julian Patrick (26 October 1927 – 8 May 2009) was an American operatic baritone and voice teacher. Born in Mississippi, Patrick grew up in Birmingham, Alabama where he was a member of the Apollo Boys Choir. After graduating from the Cincinnati Conservatory of Music, he began his professional career as a musical theatre performer in the 1950s; appearing in the original Broadway productions of The Golden Apple (1954), Bells Are Ringing (1956), Juno (1959), Once Upon a Mattress (1959), and Fiorello! (1959). He also studied singing privately in New York City with Cornelius L. Reid.

After the 1950s Patrick worked mainly as a performer in operas, making appearances at the Dallas Opera, the De Nederlandse Opera, the Grand Théâtre de Genève, the Houston Grand Opera, the Lyric Opera of Chicago, the Metropolitan Opera, the Opéra national du Rhin, the San Francisco Opera, the Vienna Volksoper, and the Welsh National Opera among other major opera houses. In 1968 he starred as Private Don Hanwell in the world premiere of Hugo Weisgall's Nine Rivers from Jordan at the New York City Opera. He was particularly active with the Seattle Opera where he notably created the role of George Milton in the world premiere of Carlisle Floyd's Of Mice and Men in 1970. He also taught on the music faculty of the University of Washington for many years and sang Alberich in the Seattle Opera performances of Wagner's Ring of the Nibelung, being declared by the Seattle Opera General Director Speight Jenkins as "the world's greatest living 'Alberich.'" He died at the age of 81 while on vacation in Santa Fe, New Mexico. He was survived by his life partner of 56 years, Donn Talenti.
