= Richard Wentworth (bass-baritone) =

American opera singer (1911–1991)

Richard Wentworth

Richard Wentworth (born Richard Holtzclaw; 1911–1991) was an American operatic bass-baritone and musical theatre actor. In 1939 he joined Fortune Gallo's San Carlo Opera Company with which he portrayed some 89 roles through 1945. He made his Broadway debut in 1942 at the Alvin Theatre as Dr. Bartolo in Once Over Lightly, an adaptation of Gioacchino Rossini's The Barber of Seville. He returned to Broadway in 1946 to portray The Butcher Boy in the short lived David Raksin musical If the Shoe Fits. Wentworth also occasionally appeared in musicals on the American theatre circuit during the 1940s and 1950s.

In 1946 Wentworth was invited to become a member of the New York City Opera by Laszlo Halasz. He remained committed to the company through 1959 where he mainly portrayed basso buffo and comprimario roles, although he occasionally got to appear in a leading part. While there he notably created roles in the world premieres of William Grant Still's Troubled Island (1949) and David Tamkin's The Dybbuk (1951). Wentworth also appeared as a guest artist with other opera companies in the United States and Canada during his career.

== Sources ==
- Biography of Richard Wentworth at lambertville-music-circus.org
