= Eunice Alberts =

American opera singer (1927–2012)

- Born: 1927; Boston, Massachusetts, United States
- Died: April 2012 (aged 84–85)
- Genres: Opera
- Occupations: Contralto, singer
- Years active: 1946–1980

Eunice Alberts (1927–2012) was an American contralto who had an active career as a concert soloist and opera singer during the 1950s through the 1980s.

== Early life and education ==
Born in Boston, Alberts attended the Girls' Latin School in her native city during her youth; earning her diploma in 1940. Subsequently, she studied singing with Cleora Wood and Rosalie Miller at the Longy School of Music, earning a certificate in vocal performance. She also studied at the Tanglewood Music Center where she drew the attention of conductor Serge Koussevitzky.

In the 1960s, Alberts attended New England Conservatory, obtaining a bachelor's degree in 1967.

== Career ==
=== Early career (1946–1950) ===
Alberts career started at the Tanglewood Music Festival in August 1946, where she, aged 19, gave her concert debut with the Boston Symphony Orchestra (BSO) as the contralto soloist in Beethoven's Symphony No. 9.

Shortly thereafter she joined a madrigal group led by Nadia Boulanger with which she toured North America and Europe for two years. She made several more appearances with the BSO during the late 1940s and early 1950s in annual appearances at Tanglewood, singing as a soloist in works like Bach's Mass in B Minor (1950) and Beethoven's Missa Solemnis (1951).

=== Opera: New York to Chicago (1950s) ===
Alberts moved to New York City in 1950 where she became a pupil of impresario Boris Goldovsky. Her first concert appearance in NYC was as the contralto soloist in Felix Mendelssohn's Elijah with the John Harms Chorus at Town Hall on April 30, 1950. She made her first appearance with the New York Philharmonic in a summer concert at Lewisohn Stadium on June 4, 1951 as the contralto soloist in Verdi's Requiem under conductor Dimitri Mitropoulos. This performance drew the attention of Laszlo Halasz, then director of the New York City Opera (NYCO), who offered her a contract to join the roster of singers at the NYCO. She accepted the offer and on October 4, 1951 Alberts made her professional opera debut as the Elderly Woman in the world premiere of David Tamkin's The Dybbuk at New York City Center. Later in the 1951-1952 NYCO season she portrayed Maddalena in Rigoletto and Donna Elvira in Don Giovanni with the company.

Alberts quickly became one of America's leading contraltos during the 1950s, singing in concerts and operas throughout the United States. In 1953 she was a soloist in Beethoven's Ninth Symphony with the Philadelphia Orchestra, the Temple University Chorus, and conductor Eugene Ormandy. She also sang with the orchestra that year in several works by Bach at the Bethlehem Bach Festival. The year 1955 proved to be a banner year for Alberts. That year she sang Bach's St. Matthew's Passion and the world premiere of Howard Hanson's Sinfonia Sacra with the Philadelphia Orchestra and sang Beethoven's Missa Solemnis with the New York Philharmonic under conductor Leonard Bernstein at United Nations General Assembly Hall with soprano Adele Addison. She also joined the roster of singers at the Lyric Opera of Chicago where she sang for two highly acclaimed seasons. She made her debut with the company on November 11, 1955 as Enrichetta to Maria Callas's Elvira in Vincenzo Bellini's I puritani. This was followed by a portrayals of Inez to Callas's Leonora in Verdi's Il Trovatore and Suzuki to Callas's Cio-Cio-San in Giacomo Puccini's Madama Butterfly. Other roles she sang with the company during the 1955-1956 season included, Marthe in Charles Gounod's Faust with Jussi Björling in the title role, Lucia in Cavalleria rusticana with Giuseppe di Stefano and Carlo Bergonzi alternating in the role of Turiddu, and the Old Woman in Italo Montemezzi's L'amore dei tre re with Dorothy Kirsten as Fiora and Robert Weede as Manfredo. In the 1956-1957 Chicago season, Alberts portrayed Wowkle in La fanciulla del West with Eleanor Steber as Minnie, Madelon in Umberto Giordano's Andrea Chénier with Mario Del Monaco in the title role, the Page in Salome with Inge Borkh in the title role, and Grimgerde in Richard Wagner's Die Walküre with Ludwig Suthaus as Siegmund.

Following her stint in Chicago, Alberts performed leading roles with the Kansas City Opera, the New Orleans Opera, the Cincinnati Opera, and the Houston Grand Opera during the late 1950s and 1960s. In 1956 she sang in Verdi's Requiem with the Connecticut Orchestra at the Stratford Festival. In 1960 she portrayed Emilia in Verdi's Otello with the Opera Society of Washington in Washington, D.C. That same year she gave a lauded performance for her New York City recital debut at Town Hall. In 1961 she returned to the NYCO to sing Marcellina in Le Nozze di Figaro, Mrs. Cripps in H.M.S. Pinafore, and Rebecca Nurse in the world premiere of Robert Ward's The Crucible.

=== Later career (1960–1980) ===
During the early 1960s Alberts decided to return to school, having never actually earned a college diploma. She entered the New England Conservatory, earning a bachelor's degree in 1967. During this time she continued to perform at various concerts, festivals and operas. In 1963, upon the death of President John F. Kennedy, Alberts sang in the pontifical mass honoring Kennedy which was broadcast nationally on CBS. She performed with the BSO in Mozart's Requiem. In 1964 she sang in a number of Schubert works with the BSO under conductor Erich Leinsdorf In 1965 she was the contralto soloist in performances of Handel's Messiah and Bach's B Minor Mass at Avery Fisher Hall under conductor Hermann Scherchen.

As an opera singer Alberts was highly active and formed a strong partnership with Sarah Caldwell's Opera Company of Boston during the 1960s through the 1980s. Her first performance with the company was as the mother in Hänsel und Gretel which was followed shortly thereafter with a performance of Mistress Quickly in Falstaff in 1961. She sang regularly with the company over the next seventeen years, notably appearing in the United States premieres of Arnold Schoenberg's Moses und Aron (as the invalid woman, 1966), Roger Sessions's Montezuma (as Cuaximatl, 1976), Glinka’s Ruslan and Ludmilla (as Ratmir, 1977), and Rodion Shchedrin's Dead Souls (as Maslennilov, 1988).

Her other Boston roles included Magdalena (1962), the voice of Antonia's mother in The Tales of Hoffmann (1965), Kseniya's nurse in Boris Godunov (1966), Mother Goose in The Rake's Progress (1967), Countess Geschwitz in Lulu (1968), Alice in Lucia di Lammermoor (1969), Mary in The Flying Dutchman (1970), The Good Soldier Schweik (1970), Suzuki (1974), Princess Marya Bolkonskay in War and Peace (1974), Beda Balanco in La vida breve (1979), Wessener's mother in Die Soldaten (1982), Junon in Orpheus in the Underworld (1982), and Alkonost in The Invisible City of Kitezh (1983).

Alberts retired from the stage in the late 1980s.

=== Miscellaneous ===
Alberts taught on the voice faculty at the University of Massachusetts Lowell.

== Awards ==
Alberts was awarded the Boston Girls' Latin School outstanding alumni award in 1990.

== Personal life ==
Alberts died on April 13, 2012.
