= Muriel O'Malley =

Australian/American actress and contralto

Muriel O'Malley, also known by her married name Muriel Roet, (19 May 1907 – 21 August 1994) was an Australian-born American actress and contralto who had an active performance career in musicals, operas, and concerts from the 1920s through the 1960s. She is best remembered for her work on Broadway; including creating roles in the original productions of two musical by Rodgers and Hammerstein: Grandma Taylor in Allegro (1947) and Sister Margaretta in The Sound of Music (1959). She was also a leading performer with the St. Louis Municipal Opera and the New York City Opera. With the latter company she portrayed the role of Celeste in the world premiere of William Grant Still's Troubled Island in 1949. She starred in television films of two operettas; portraying Aurelia Popoff in The Chocolate Soldier on the NBC anthology series Musical Comedy Time in 1950 and Dame Carruthers in Gilbert and Sullivan's The Yeomen of the Guard on the Hallmark Hall of Fame in 1957.

== Early life and education ==
The daughter of Dominick O'Malley and May O'Malley, Muriel Florence Ethel O' Malley was born in Cobar, New South Wales on May 19, 1907. Raised in Western Queensland, O'Malley spent most of her early life in the town of Longreach. There she attended the Presentation Convent Schools, including Our Lady's College. She completed her high school education at Holy Cross College in Woollahra, New South Wales just outside Sydney.

As part of her education in the Presentation Convent Schools, O'Malley received instruction in music through an affiliate program of both the Royal Academy of Music (RAM) in London and the London College of Music (LCM) . Her voice teacher during these years was Mr. A. R. Richards. At the age of 13, she successfully passed the London College of Music Examinations, earning an Associate degree (this is a different and higher level degree than the associate degree used in the United States). At 16 she earned a second Associate degree in music from Trinity College London, and in 1924 she earned a 'Teacher's Diploma of Trinity College'. In 1923 she began studies at the Sydney Conservatorium of Music; graduating in August 1925.

In 1925 O'Malley won the Ethel Pedley scholarship for singing; a competitive scholarship that paid for the winner's tuition and living expenses at the RAM over a two-year period in London. Following this competition win, O'Malley gave her first professional concerts as a classical contralto at Shire Hall in Longreach, and the Tivoli Theatre in Sydney in October and November 1925. She left Australia for England in the summer of 1926 in order to continue her studies at the RAM. There she studied singing with Frederic King and piano with Charles Lynch. After her first year of studies, she was awarded bronze medals in singing and aural training.

== Career ==
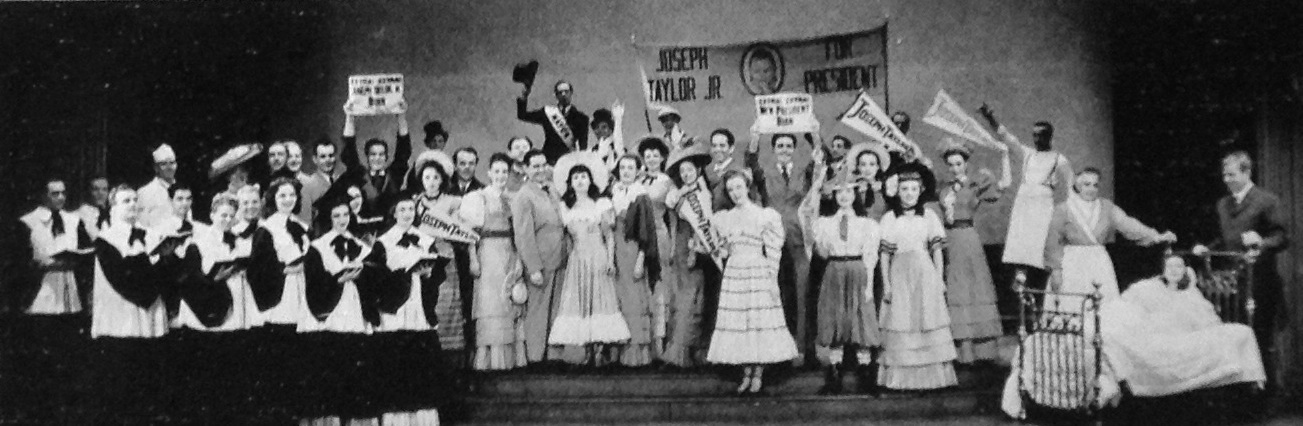
From the original Broadway production of Allegro: the townsfolk assemble to celebrate Joe's birth in the song "Joseph Taylor, Jr.": William Ching as Dr. Taylor, with Muriel O'Malley as Grandma and Annamary Dickey as Marjorie (in bed), all at right.

O'Malley worked as a concert and opera singer on the stage and radio in Australia, Europe, and Africa in the late 1920s and 1930s. Her opera repertoire included Amneris in Aida, Azucena in Il trovatore and Princess Eboli in Don Carlos, and she was mentored by Nellie Melba. Her career was interrupted due to World War II during which time she did not perform. In April 1937, she married Dutch businessman Leo Roet in London. Her husband worked as a manufacturer of industrial diamonds.

In 1944 O'Malley immigrated with her husband to the United States, and she became a United States citizen in 1948. She made her Broadway debut in 1944 as a Lady of the Court in the featured vocal octet in Fritz Kreisler's operetta Rhapsody. Her first leading role on Broadway was as Aurelia Popoff in the 1947 revival of the Oscar Straus operetta The Chocolate Soldier at the New Century Theatre. Praised for her portrayal by the New York critics, the production had toured prior to reaching the New York stage; including stops at the Forrest Theatre in Philadelphia (1947) and the Colonial Theatre, Boston (1947). She later reprised the role at several regional theaters, including the Pittsburgh Civic Light Opera (1949) and the Starlight Theatre, Kansas City, Missouri (1956). She also performed the role for NBC in the 1950 television adaptation of the operetta broadcast on Musical Comedy Time.

O'Malley received good reviews portraying a variety of roles in the 1949 Jean Kerr and Walter Kerr musical revue Touch and Go at the Broadhurst Theatre. However, her greatest successes on Broadway were in three musicals by Oscar Hammerstein II, beginning with the role of Grandma Taylor in the original production of Rodgers and Hammerstein's Allegro in 1947. This was followed by the role of Lilli in the 1951 revival of the Jerome Kern and Hammerstein musical Music in the Air at the Ziegfeld Theatre. Her last appearance on Broadway was portraying Sister Margaretta in the original 1959 production of The Sound of Music.

O'Malley appeared in several operas with the New York City Opera; most notably creating the role of Celeste in the world premiere of William Grant Still's Troubled Island in 1949. One of her other roles with the company was as Miss Todd in Gian Carlo Menotti's The Old Maid and the Thief in 1947. She was also a regular performer in light operas and musicals with the St. Louis Municipal Opera in the 1940s and 1950s. Her roles with that company included Aunt Em in The Wizard of Oz (1945, 1946, & 1951), Greta in The Great Waltz (1946 and 1956), the title role in Roberta (1954), Mother Grieg in Song of Norway (1954), and Aurelia Popoff in The Chocolate Soldier (1956). She also performed in two seasons at the Memphis Open Air Theatre; performing the roles of Katisha in The Mikado (1949), Aurelia Popoff in The Chocolate Soldier (1949), Clotilde in The New Moon (1949 and 1950), Lady Mary in The Vagabond King (1950), and Madame Dondidier in The Pink Lady (1950).

In 1957 O'Malley portrayed Dame Carruthers in a television film of Gilbert and Sullivan's The Yeomen of the Guard that was broadcast on the anthology series Hallmark Hall of Fame. The cast also included a young Barbara Cook as Elsie Maynard, Alfred Drake as Jack Point, and Celeste Holm as Phoebe Meryll. In 1962 she reprised the role of Mother Grieg in Song of Norway with the Los Angeles Civic Light Opera in a cast led by Patrice Munsel as the Countess.

She died on 21 August 1994 in Dade City, Florida.
