= Lawrence Winters =

American opera singer (1915–1965)

Lawrence Winters (née Lawrence Lafayette Whisonant; 15 November 1915 – 24 September 1965), bass-baritone, was an American opera singer who had an active international career from the mid-1940s through the mid-1960s. He was part of the first generation of black opera singers to achieve wide success and is viewed as part of an instrumental group of performers who helped break down the barriers of racial prejudice in the opera world. He began his opera career at the New York City Opera in 1946 during a time when the NYCO was one of the few American opera companies hiring black artists. He sang a varied repertoire there through 1955, after which his career was largely based in Europe until his death at the age of fifty.

== Biography ==
Born in Kings Creek, South Carolina, Winters began to study singing privately in Salisbury, North Carolina, before entering Howard University in 1941, where he studied singing with Todd Duncan.

In the summer of 1942, he was a soloist with the Naumburg Orchestral Concerts in the Naumburg Bandshell, Central Park, the first public performance of his career.

After graduating from Howard in 1944 with a bachelor's degree in music, he joined the Eva Jessye Choir. Shortly thereafter he sang the lead role in a concert production of Clarence Cameron White's Ouanga. Following this he became musical director in the Special Services Division at Fort Huachuca as a member of the U.S. Armed Forces.

After the end of World War II, Winters moved to New York City in 1946 where he was almost immediately engaged for the Broadway musical revue Call Me Mister, portraying a variety of smaller roles. His official recital debut followed in 1947 at Town Hall in New York. Then, in 1948, he debuted as an opera singer in the New York City Opera (NYCO) in Verdi's Aida as Amonasro. He portrayed several more roles with the NYCO over the next seven years, including Dessalines in William Grant Still's Troubled Island (1949), the four villains in Jacques Offenbach's The Tales of Hoffmann (1949), Escamillo in Georges Bizet's Carmen (1949), Tchelio in Sergei Prokofiev's The Love for Three Oranges (1950), Tonio in Ruggero Leoncavallo's Pagliacci (1950), Timur in Giacomo Puccini's Turandot (1950), Alfio in Cavalleria rusticana (1950), The Messenger in the world premiere of David Tamkin's The Dybbuk (1951), the title role in Giuseppe Verdi's Rigoletto (1951), King Balthazar in Gian Carlo Menotti's Amahl and the Night Visitors (1952), Colline in Puccini's La bohème (1952), the title role in Béla Bartók's Bluebeard's Castle (1953), Count Almaviva in Mozart's The Marriage of Figaro (1954), Joe in Show Boat (1954), Germont in Verdi's La traviata (1955), and Diomede in the New York premiere of William Walton's Troilus and Cressida (1955) among others.

While working with the NYCO, Winters also toured as a concert artist and performed in operas with companies in Europe. In 1949 he came to Europe for the first time, drawing particular acclaim for a recital given in Berlin. He also gave concert tours in Central America and in the United States Virgin Islands. In 1950 he joined the roster of principal baritones at the Royal Swedish Opera where he sang a number of roles for two seasons. In 1951, he sang the role of Porgy opposite Camilla Williams's Bess in the most complete recording of Gershwin's Porgy and Bess made up to that time. He made his debut with the Hamburg State Opera in 1952 reprising his role in Aida, returning there frequently through 1957. He made his first appearance with the New York Philharmonic singing excerpts from operas in concert in 1957.

In 1957 Winters became a principal baritone on the roster at the Deutsche Oper Berlin where he spent most of his time performing in operas through 1961. He also sang in a number of roles with the Vienna State Opera and the San Francisco Opera during these years, including the title role in Carl Orff's Die Kluge, Amonasro, Fritz Kothner in Die Meistersinger von Nürnberg, Tonio, and Wolfram in Tannhäuser. In February 1960 he returned to Broadway as Tyree Tucker in Ketti Frings's play The Long Dream. One of the few non-singing roles he portrayed during his career, Winters garnered a Tony Award nomination for his performance. He returned for one last performance at the NYCO in 1962, portraying the role of Porgy. He returned to the Hamburg State Opera in 1961, working as a principal baritone with the company until his death at the age of 50 in 1965. Winters is buried at the Ohlsdorf Cemetery there.

== Family ==
Lawrence Whisonant married Aida C. Bearden (1917–2007) on June 9, 1943, in Manhattan. She was a first cousin of artist Romare Bearden, who was the son of journalist and civic activist Bessye J. Bearden. Aida's mother was Anna Elizabeth Miller (1878–1972). By way of her mother's first marriage to the Rev. Primus Priss Alston (1851–1910), Aida was a half-sister of the artist Charles Alston.
