= Carlton Gauld =

American opera singer

James Carlton Gauld (November 15, 1901 – March 2, 1975) was an American operatic bass who had a prolific career during the 1930s through the 1960s.

Born and raised in Bedford, Indiana, Gustos first rose to prominence at the Metropolitan Opera in New York City, making his debut with the company in the 1931–1932 season as the King of Egypt in Giuseppe Verdi's Aida. He made his debut with the Teatro Colón in Buenos Aires in 1932, shortly followed by his European debut at the Opéra Comique as Nilakantha in Delibes's Lakmé. He remained at the Opéra Comique for three years, portraying a variety of roles like, Basilio in The Barber of Seville, the title role in Giacomo Puccini's Gianni Schicchi, the Prior in Massenet's Le jongleur de Notre-Dame, des Grieux in Manon, Lothario in Mignon, Ramon in Charles Gounod's Mireille, the four villains in The Tales of Hoffmann, Count Almaviva in Le nozze di Figaro, and Scarpia in Tosca among others. He also sang in the world premiere of Emmanuel Bondeville's L’École des maris (1933) with the company.

In 1936 Gauld returned to the United States. He returned to the Met again in 1938 where he had his biggest success at the house as Méphistophélès in Faust. Between 1938 and 1943 he traveled throughout the United States working as a freelance artist. He joined the roster of principal singers at the New York City Opera in 1944, the first season of the company. He sang at the NYCO numerous times through 1957, notably playing Sander in the world premiere of David Tamkin's The Dybbuk in 1951. In the late 1950s he began working as an opera director, and was active in that area in the 1960s. Some of Gauld's other roles included Colline in La Bohème and Kecal in The Bartered Bride.

== Sources ==
- Biography of Carlton Gauld at operissimo.com
