= Emile Renan =

American opera singer

Emile Renan (28 June 1913 - 8 December 2001) was an American operatic bass-baritone and stage director who had a long association with the New York City Opera. He also performed as a guest artist with the other opera companies in North America throughout his career. He was particularly known for his portrayal of buffo roles and for his work in 20th century operas.

== Biography ==
Born and raised in Brooklyn, New York, Renan studied voice under Eleanor McLellan and John Daggett Howell in New York City. Early on in his career he portrayed the Sacristan in the NYCO's inaugural opera production, Puccini's Tosca, on 21 February 1944. He went on to sing more than thirty-two more roles with the company over the next fifteen years, mostly in buffo parts. He sang in many twentieth century operas at the NYCO, including the world premieres of David Tamkin's The Dybbuk (as Meyer, 1951) and Robert Kurka's The Good Soldier Schweik (as the Army doctor, 1958). He also portrayed Baron Regnard in the premiere of the revised version of Robert Ward's He Who Gets Slapped (1959). Some of his other roles with the company included Beckmesser in Wagner's Die Meistersinger von Nürnberg, the Principál komediantů in The Bartered Bride, and Oscar Hubbard in Regina

Renan also sang with other opera companies throughout North America during his career, including the American Opera Company, the Baltimore Opera Company, the Opera Company of Boston, the Canadian Opera Company, the Columbia Opera Company, the Chicago Opera Company, the Houston Grand Opera, Miami Opera, the NBC Opera Theatre, the New Orleans Opera, Opéra de Montréal, the Palacio de Bellas Artes, the Pittsburgh Opera, the San Antonio Grand Opera Festival, and the Vancouver Opera. After retiring from the stage in the early 1960s, Renan taught for many years on the voice faculty at the Juilliard School and worked as a stage director. For the NYCO he directed two productions in 1965, Carmen and I Pagliacci. He died in Englewood, New Jersey at the age of 88.
