= Frances Bible =

American opera singer (1919–2001)

Bible in 1970

Frances Lillian Bible (January 26, 1919 – January 29, 2001) was an American operatic mezzo-soprano who had a thirty-year career at the New York City Opera between 1948 and 1978. She also made a number of opera appearances with other companies throughout the United States, but only made a limited number of appearances abroad. Martin Bernheimer wrote in Opera News that, "Frances Bible was cheated by destiny. She never quite achieved the international recognition she deserved. Bible had it all—a mellow, wide-ranging mezzo-soprano, an attractive stage presence, genuine theatrical flair, a probing mind and a technique that allowed her to sing bel-canto filigree one night, Verdian drama the next. She was one of the rare American singers who savor the English language. She understood the value of economy, never stooping to easy effects. Perhaps she was too versatile, too tasteful and — dare one say it? — too intelligent for her own good."

== Biography ==
Bible was born and raised in Sackets Harbor, New York. She studied opera at the Juilliard School in New York City under Queena Mario and Belle Julie Soudant before making her professional opera debut in 1948 at the New York City Opera as the Shepherd in Giacomo Puccini's Tosca. Possessing a warm voice and vibrant stage presence, she became a favorite at that house during the time when Beverly Sills and Norman Treigle were also fixtures at the NYCO. She sang Cornelia to Sills's Cleopatra in the NYCO's 1967 production of Handel's Giulio Cesare which made Sills an international opera star.

In 1949 Bible appeared in the world premiere of William Grant Still's Troubled Island. Her first major successes at the NYCO were in 1950 as Amneris in Aida and Cherubino, a trouser role, in Mozart's Le nozze di Figaro. Another major early triumph at the house was her first portrayal of Angelina in La Cenerentola in 1953. Trouser roles became of specialty of her, and she was particularly popular in roles like Octavian in Strauss's Der Rosenkavalier, Oberon in Britten's A Midsummer Night's Dream, Nicklausse in Offenbach's The Tales of Hoffmann, Siebel in Charles Gounod's Faust and Hänsel in Hänsel und Gretel. Other roles in which she excelled were, Dorabella in Così fan tutte, Jocasta in Stravinsky's Oedipus Rex, Herodias in Strauss's Salome, Ottavia in L'Incoronazione di Poppea, the title role in Britten's The Rape of Lucretia, and Ulrica in Un ballo in maschera among many others.

During Bible's career at the NYCO she sang in several world premieres including the roles of Frade in David Tamkin's The Dybbuk in 1951, Elizabeth Proctor in Robert Ward's The Crucible in 1961, and Mrs Tracy in Thea Musgrave's The Voice of Ariadne in 1977. She also sang the role of Augusta Tabor in the original production of Douglas Moore's The Ballad of Baby Doe at the Central City Opera in Colorado in 1956 (although Martha Lipton actually sang the role for the work's opening night). She later reprised the role of Augusta at the NYCO and recorded both the roles of Augusta and Elizabeth Proctor with the NYCO in 1961.

In addition to her work with the NYCO, Bible was a regular performer in America's second-tier houses, appearing in productions with the Baltimore Opera Company, Cincinnati Opera, Dallas Opera (1978), Hawaii Opera Theatre, Los Angeles Opera, New Orleans Opera, Philadelphia Grand Opera Company (1959, 1970), and the Seattle Opera (1968) among others. In 1955 she sang the role of Néris for the United States premiere of Luigi Cherubini's Médée, presented by the American Opera Society in concert at Carnegie Hall. In 1956 she toured the United States singing Cherubino with the NBC Opera Theatre, also appearing in a handful of their opera recordings for television. She sang in a few production with two of America's more important opera houses: the Houston Grand Opera and the San Francisco Opera. She made her debut in Houston as Octavian in 1958. In San Francisco she portrayed Evadne in the United States premiere of William Walton's Troilus and Cressida in 1955. Her other appearances in San Francisco included Bersi in Andrea Chénier (1955), Octavian (1955, 1960), Elizabeth Proctor (1965), Siebel (1955), and the Watercress Vendor and the Chair Mender in Louise (1955). Two triumphs from the latter part of her career were performances of Mélisande in Debussy's Pelléas et Mélisande at the Caramoor International Music Festival and Eglantine in a concert performance of Weber's Euryanthe with the New York Philharmonic, both in 1970.

On the international stage Bible made appearances at the De Nederlandse Opera and the Vancouver Opera. She sang in one production with the Vienna State Opera, the role of Amneris in 1963. She was on the roster of principal singers at the Badisches Staatstheater Karlsruhe during the 1963-1964 season, and she sang the role of Cherubino with the Scottish Opera in 1964. Her biggest success on the international stage were three lauded performances at the Glyndebourne Festival: the role of Cherubino in 1955 and the role of Ottavia at both the 1962 and 1963 festivals.

After her retirement from the stage, Bible taught on the voice faculty at Rice University in Houston. She later retired to Hemet, California where she died at the age of 82.
