= Hortense Love =

American singer

- Hortense Love, from a 1934 newspaper
- Born: Hermione Hortense Love; November 21, 1910; Muskogee, Oklahoma, U.S.
- Died: 2001 (aged 90–91)
- Occupations: Concert singer, choral conductor
- Spouse: Chelcey H. Tally (married 1943-)
- Parent: James Milton Love (father)
- Relatives: Everett Robbins (brother)

Hermione Hortense Love (November 21, 1910 – 2001) was an American concert soprano and choral director based in Chicago.

== Early life and education ==
Love was born to Black and Creek parents in Muskogee, Oklahoma, and raised in Chicago. Her father was James Milton Love and her mother passed away when she was 2 years old. Hortense Love started her musical education at the age of 3. Encouraged by her father she began piano lessons. She was later sent to live with her grandmother, uncle and older brother. Her brother was the musician and composer Everett Robbins.

Beginning in childhood, she received a multitude of musical training. Love received piano, theory, dancing, and dramatic classes. She was also regularly taken to see performances of all the leading artists of her time and provided with over a thousand records of musical performances to study.

She graduated from Wendell Phillips High School and the Chicago Musical College, was awarded a Douglas Smith Foundation scholarship to study in Chicago under Mme. Nina Bolmar, and went on to earn a degree in music education from Northwestern University in 1931. During her time in Chicago, Love won a radio audition and, through the sponsorship of an internationally renowned financier, began studying under Dr. Frank Laird Waller. She went to Paris for further voice training under Mme. Marie Godard before World War II, and earned a master's degree from the DePaul University.

== Career ==
Love was a concert soprano and choral director. She gave her debut recital at 20 years old in 1931 in Chicago at The Olivet Baptist Church. She performed a rigorous program accompanied by Juliette Henderson. Three of the spirituals included in the program were "Motherless Child," "City in Heaven," and Edward Boatney's "On My Journey." In 1934 she taught voice classes at a summer program in Lake Geneva, Wisconsin. In 1936 she sang on a radio broadcast, and conducted a 250-voice chorus for the National Youth Administration in Chicago.

She gave her first New York City recital at the Town Hall venue in 1941, with Paul Ulanowsky as her accompanist. She sang again at Town Hall three more times: again with Ulanowsky's accompaniment, in 1948 performing a program that included works by Antonin Dvořák and Franz Schubert, as well as French and English song groups and spirituals arranged by Hall Johnson. at a benefit concert in 1951 featuring works by Johann Sebastian Bach, Wolfgang Amadeus Mozart, Richard Strauss, Gustav Mahler, Gabriel Fauré, Ernest Chausson, and Francis Poulenc, along with a concluding group of songs in English; and again in 1956, when her program included works by Paul Laurence Dunbar, J. Rosamond Johnson, and William Grant Still.

Love toured the United States in 1946,1947, and again in 1955. During her tour in 1947, Love performed five negro spirituals in her program. These spirituals were hand-selected by Love and arranged specifically for her by the famous pianist and composer Margaret Bonds. The Negro spirituals, “Dry Bones,” “You Can Tell The World,” “Sit Down Servant,” “Lord I Just Can’t Keep From Cryin’,” and “I’ll Reach To Heaven” featured in her program were printed in an album by the Mutual Music Society. She was accompanied by former Lincoln University instructor and pianist Clyde Winkfield during this tour. In the 1950s she included dramatic monologues to her recitals. In 1962 she sang at a scholarship benefit in Chicago. In her later years, she conducted Handel's Messiah annually, for at least twelve years, at Chicago's Monumental Baptist Church, with guest soloists including William Warfield.

In the 1970s, Love was student activities director and assistant dean at Loop Junior College. She was a member of the hymn selection committee of The New National Baptist Hymnal in 1982. She was also a member of Alpha Kappa Alpha, the Chicago Music Association, and the National Association of Negro Musicians.

== Critic reviews ==
During a 1937 performance at the Studebaker Theatre in Chicago, Love received favorable reviews in The Chicago Defender, which noted that her interpretations were "clear, simple, and artistic."

In 1941, The New York Times commented that she "made known a voice of fine possibilities with a wide range" and was "capable of acquiring real flexibility in coloratura."

During her 1945 tour, music critic George Garner, writing in The Chicago Defender, described her as the "Goddess of Song," praising her ability to project tone poems with "sheer beauty and a mastery" that won audience acclaim.

While many of her performances were well received, some critics offered less favorable reviews. In The New York Times, she was described saying, "the limitations of her voice and her voice techniques were such as to give little pleasure."

== Personal life ==
Hortense Love was married to Chelcey H Tally on June 27, 1943. The ceremony was at her home and attended by many influential musicians and socialites.
