= Suzette Forgues Halasz =

Canadian cellist and music educator

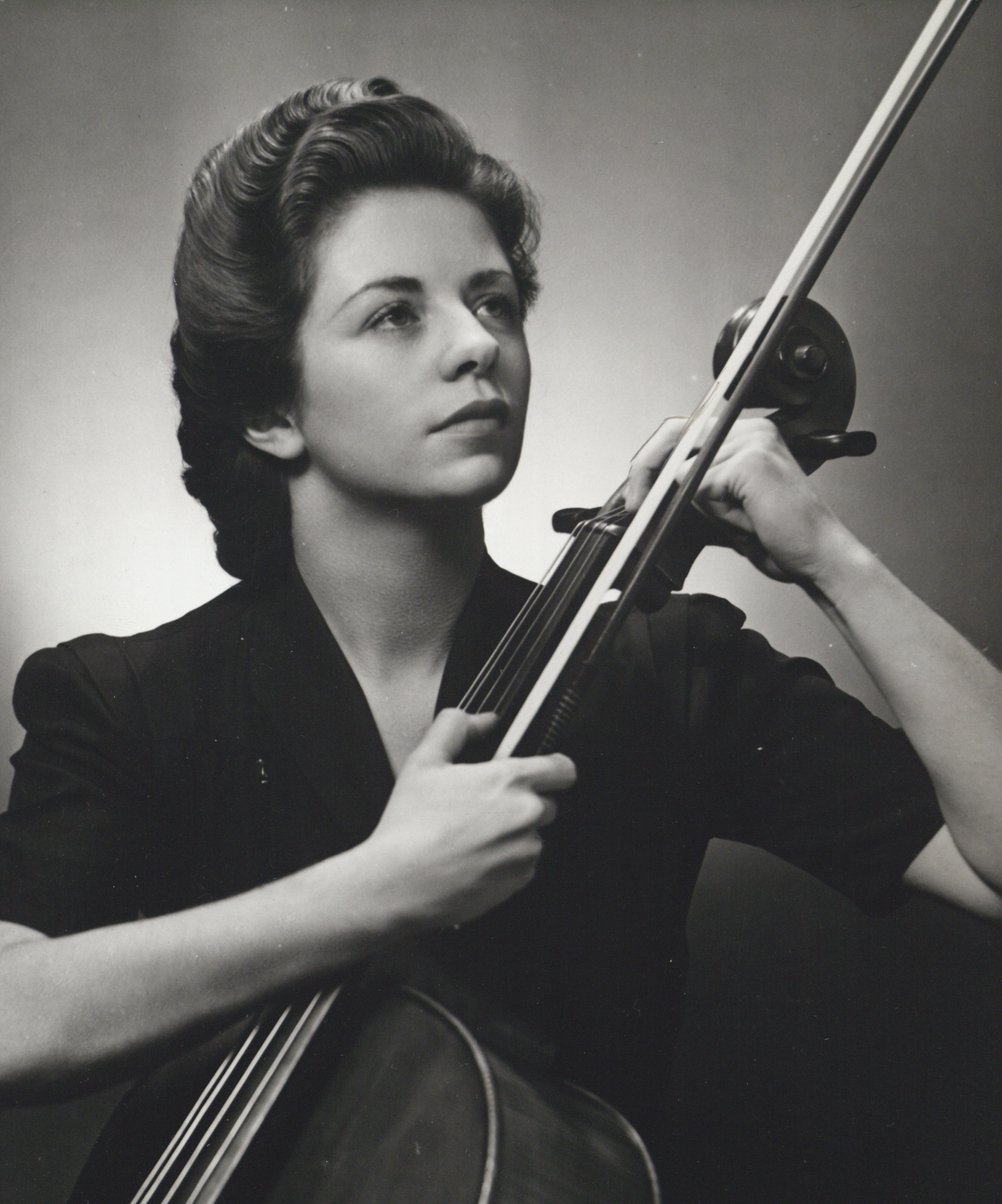
- Halasz in 1944

Background information
- Born: Suzette Forgues; 14 April 1918; Montreal, Canada
- Died: 8 December 2004 (aged 86) Port Washington, New York, USA
- Genres: Classical
- Occupation: Musician
- Instrument: Cello
- Years active: 1942–1954
- Formerly of: Montreal Symphony Orchestra, New York City Opera
- Spouse: Laszlo Halasz
- Award: Prix d'Europe (1940)

Suzette Forgues Halasz (14 April 1918 – 8 December 2004) was a Canadian cellist and music educator. She held the post of principal cellist of the Montreal Symphony Orchestra from 1942 to 1946 and worked in the same capacity at the New York City Opera for many years. She was married to conductor Laszlo Halasz for over 50 years.

== Life and career ==
Born Suzette Forgues in Montreal, she was the daughter of T. A. Forgues and Margaret Gratton. She was a child prodigy and began giving public piano concerts at the age of 4. She began studying the cello seriously at the age of 10 with Gustave Labelle and at age 11 gave her first public recitals at the Theatre des Petits Enfants and at the Ball de League de la Jeunesse Feminine in Montreal. She went on to earn a diploma in cello performance from the Académie de musique du Québec in 1940 where she was a pupil of Jean-Baptiste Dubois.

From 1938 to 1942, Forgues Halasz studied with Emanuel Feuermann in both New York City and California. She also studied with Felix Salmond at the Juilliard School. Part of the funding for her New York studies was made possible through her winning the 1940 Prix d'Europe prize. She returned to her native city in 1942 to become principal cellist of the Montreal Symphony Orchestra (then known as the Concert Symphonique of Montreal) under conductor Wilfrid Pelletier. She appeared as a soloist with the MSO and other Canadian orchestras during the 1940s. She also appeared as a soloist with the Charleston Symphony Orchestra.

In 1945, she met conductor Laszlo Halasz, founder of the New York City Opera, while he was on a performance tour in Canada. The two began a romantic relationship and were soon married. She left her position at the MSO at that time and relocated to New York City where she became principal cellist of the NYCO orchestra; a position she held through 1952. During her tenure there she performed under famous conductors like Leopold Stokowski and Leonard Bernstein.

After 1954, Forgues Halasz abandoned her career as a performer to focus on supporting her husband's career and raising their two children (George and Suzanne). She later taught for many years on the music faculty of Queens College, City University of New York and privately out of her home in Port Washington, New York. She died in Port Washington at the age of 85.
