= Sergius Kagen =

American pianist and composer (1909–1964)

Sergius Kagen (August 22, 1909 – March 1, 1964) was an American pianist, composer, music editor and voice teacher.

== Life and musical career ==
He was born in St. Petersburg, Russia, the third son of wealthy, intellectual Jewish parents, his father Isaiah Kagen, a newspaperman, and his mother Vera Lipshitz, a writer and educator. His older brother was studying to be a pianist, but he died in the Russian Revolution. Sergius then began his own piano study at the age of nine and soon entered the St. Petersburg Conservatory. But in 1920 his family fled the Revolution, moving to Berlin, and a year later he studied with Leonid Kreutzer and Paul Juon at the Hochschule für Musik.

He and his family moved again, to the United States in 1925, and in 1930 he entered the Juilliard School in New York City, studying piano with Carl Friedberg, composition with Rubin Goldmark and singing with Marcella Sembrich, and earned his diploma in 1934. After Sembrich's death in 1935, he took over the training of many of her students, and he formally joined the faculty at Juilliard in 1940. There he taught singing and vocal literature from 1940 to 1964, and at the Union Theological Seminary, from 1957 also until his death. He married soprano Genevieve Greer in 1937. He became an American citizen in 1930.

He became influential and important to the field of singing and voice pedagogy through his own teaching, as well as his writings and editions of a wide variety of vocal works. One of his students at Juilliard was the important American mezzo-soprano Jan DeGaetani.

As a pianist, he specialized in accompanying singers, especially important artists such as Povla Frijsh, Ezio Pinza and Mack Harrell. In the late 1940s he appeared with the newly formed Bach Aria Group, an ensemble of singers and instrumentalists that presents the works of J. S. Bach.

== Music and writing ==
He began his work as a composer later in life, after 1949. He wrote somewhere between 50 and 70 songs, and about 20 of them were published. They are written in a chromatic idiom with careful attention to text declamation.

His three-act opera Hamlet, in a lyrical style ranging from tonal to 12-note, was first performed in Baltimore on 9 November 1962. A second opera, The Suitor (based on Molière's Monsieur de Pourceaugnac), was never completed.

As an editor, he prepared 39 volumes of songs and arias for the International Music Company. These editions cover a wide range of historical eras and vocal styles: opera arias, Baroque works by Purcell, Handel, and Scarlatti, German Lieder by most of the important composers, and many French mélodies by both familiar and less-familiar composers.

As a writer on singing, he published his important catalog of vocal literature Music for the Voice in 1949. A year later he wrote a second book for voice teachers, On Studying Singing. These books and musical editions are still in print and are still widely used by American singers and voice teachers today.

Kagen died in New York, New York.

== Books by Sergius Kagen ==
- Music for the Voice (New York, 1949, Indiana University Press, 2nd edition, 1968)
- On Studying Singing (New York, Norton, 1950, Revised)

== Music ==
Songs for voice and piano

- All Day I Hear the Noise of Waters (James Joyce), 1950
- Because I Could Not Stop for Death (Emily Dickinson), Leeds Music Corp., 1951
- Drum (Langston Hughes), Mercury Music, 1954
- The End of the World (Archibald MacLeish)
- A June Day (Sara Teasdale)Weintraub Music Co., 1950
- I'm Nobody (Emily Dickinson), Weintraub Music Co., 1950
- I Think I Could Turn... (Walt Whitman), Mercury Music, 1952
- Impression IV (E. E. Cummings)
- A June Day (Sara Teasdale), 1950
- Let It Be Forgotten (Sara Teasdale), Weintraub Music Co., 1950
- London (William Blake), Mercury Music, 1954
- Mag (Carl Sandburg), Weintraub Music Co., 1950
- Maybe (Carl Sandburg), Weintraub Music Co., 1950
- Memory, Hither Come (William Blake), Mercury Music, 1952
- Mill Doors (Carl Sandburg), 1956
- Miss T (Walter De la Mare), Weintraub Music Co., 1950
- O Cool is the Valley Now (James Joyce)
- Prayer (Langston Hughes), Leeds Music Corp., 1951
- She Weeps over Rahoon (James Joyce)
- Sleep Now, O Sleep Now (James Joyce), Leeds Music Corp., 1951
- Three Satires, Mercury Music, 1956/1961
1. Persons of Intelligence and Culture (Louis MacNeice)
2. Yonder See the Morning Blink (A. E. Housman)
3. How Pleasant it is to have Money (Arthur Hugh Clough)
- Upstream (Carl Sandburg), Weintraub Music Co., 1950

Other musical works

- Hamlet, opera in 3 acts, 1962
- The Suitor, opera, unfinished, 1964
- various piano pieces
