= Opera Noire of New York =

Opera Noire of New York is a performing arts company, as well as a resource and network for African-American artists. ONNY is an organization which has performed in multiple venues in the New York City metropolitan area. Opera Noire was founded by leading New York City Opera tenor Robert Mack, baritone Kenneth Overton and tenor Barron Coleman. The group consists of all African American opera singers.

ONNY has partnered with the Schomburg Center for Research in Black Culture and New York City Opera to present rarely performed live excerpts from the operas Treemonisha, Ouanga, Four Saints in Three Acts, Till Victory is Won, Troubled in Mind, and I Was Looking at the Ceiling and Then I Saw the Sky by composers John Adams, Edward Boatner, Mark Fax, Scott Joplin, Virgil Thomson, and Clarence Cameron White. This program was presented in honor of the Schomburg Center's 85th Anniversary and Howard Dodson's 25th Anniversary as its director, and dedicated to the memory of the distinguished author and musician Raoul Abdul (1929–2010). It was the first in a series that also includes A Tribute to Robert McFerrin and The Life and Times of Malcolm X.
