= The Dybbuk (opera) =

Opera by David Tamkin

The Dybbuk is an opera in three acts by composer David Tamkin. The work uses an English libretto by Alex Tamkin, the composer's brother, which is based on S. Ansky’s Yiddish play of the same name. Composed in 1933, the work was not premiered until October 4, 1951 when it was mounted by the New York City Opera through the efforts of Laszlo Halasz. Prior to the premiere, excerpts from the work had been given in concert, both in Portland, Oregon (where Alex Tamkin lived) and in New York City. The opera was originally supposed to premiere at the New York City Opera in 1950 but was postponed for financial reasons. The opera was also performed at the Jewish Community Center in Seattle in 1963.

== Roles ==
Role	Voice type	Premiere Cast, October 4, 1951 (Conductor: – Joseph Rosenstock)
Channon	tenor	Robert Rounseville
Leah	soprano	Patricia Neway
The Messenger	baritone	Lawrence Winters
Rabbi Azrael	baritone	Mack Harrell
Meyer	bass-baritone	Emile Renan
Sender	bass	Carlton Gauld
Chennoch	baritone	Arthur Newman
Frade	mezzo-soprano	Frances Bible
Elderly Woman	contralto	Eunice Alberts
Gittel	soprano	Shirley Russell
Bassia	mezzo-soprano	Edith Evans
1st Batlon	tenor	Nathaniel Sprinzena
2nd Batlon	bass	Richard Wentworth
3rd Batlon	tenor	Michael Pollock
Menashe	tenor	Armond Harkless
Rabbi Mendel	tenor	Luigi Vellucci
