= Bach Aria Group =

External audio
- You may listen to the Bach Aria Group performing Johann Sebastian Bach's "Cantata 79: Gott ist unser Sonn" here on archive.org

The Bach Aria Group is an ensemble of vocal and instrumental musicians that was created in 1946 by William H. Scheide in New York City to perform the works of J. S. Bach.

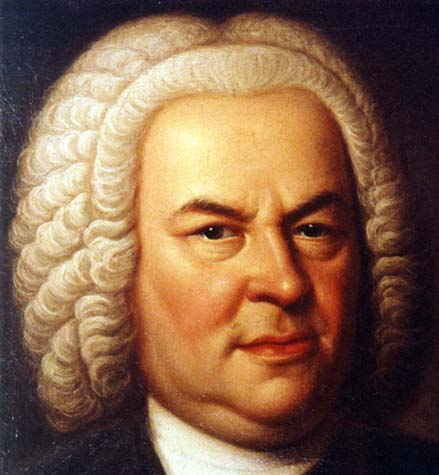
Johann Sebastian Bach

== Founding period, 1946-1980 ==
The American Bach scholar William H. Scheide brought together a group of New York musicians in 1946 to perform arias from Bach's cantatas and other works. Besides setting the artistic goals and policies, Scheide also helped fund the group, making up for any financial deficits from his own resources.

The five original singers were sopranos Ellen Osborn and Jean Carlton, alto Margaret Tobias, tenor Robert Harmon, and bass-baritone Norman Farrow. The five instrumentalists who accompanied them were violinist Maurice Welk, oboist Robert Bloom, flutist Julius Baker, 'cellist David Soyer, and keyboard player Sergius Kagen.

Over the years there were changes in personnel: cellist Bernard Greenhouse replaced David Soyer, and keyboard players Erich Itor Kahn and Paul Ulanowsky came after Sergius Kagen. Several important singers were later guests or regular members, including Jennie Tourel, Lois Marshall, Richard Lewis, Mack Harrell, Jan Peerce, Eileen Farrell, and Maureen Forrester.

The ensemble made its Carnegie Hall debut in 1948, and made regular concert tours beginning in the 1950s. They also performed with many important orchestras as a solo group in the larger works of Bach, especially his Passions. They also made many recordings at that time.

== Recent period, 1980-present ==
After more than 30 years of leadership, Scheide announced that he would disband the ensemble in 1980, proclaiming that "his aim had been accomplished". However, by that time its performance style had grown out of fashion, not in line with the growing "authentic performance" movement.

But instead of disbanding, flutist Samuel Baron (who joined the ensemble in 1965) asked to take over the leadership of the group, and Mr. Scheide happily agreed.

After a year of rebuilding in 1981, they resumed their performance and touring schedule, and they developed a highly successful workshop for performers, the Bach Aria Festival and Institute, as a summer program at Stony Brook University on Long Island. The Institute and Festival continued its operations until the summer of 1997, training an entire generation of American performers of Bach's music.

The membership continued to change through the years. In the 1980s and 1990s the instrumentalists in the group included Samuel Baron, oboist Ronald Roseman, violinist Daniel Phillips, 'cellist Timothy Eddy, and keyboard player Yehudi Wyner. They continued to perform on modern instruments and at modern pitch (A=440 Hz), even after other groups changed to reproductions of Baroque instruments at a lower "Baroque pitch" (A=415 Hz).

The singers changed more frequently, but in the 1980s they included soprano Susan Davenny Wyner, alto Janice Taylor, tenor Seth McCoy, and bass Thomas Paul. Later singers included soprano Carol Webber, altos Jan DeGaetani, D'Anna Fortunato and Mary Westbrook-Geha, tenor David Britton and baritone William Sharp. In 2001 the membership included flutist Tara Helen O'Connor, Daniel Phillips, Timothy Eddy, Yehudi Wyner, with soprano Beverly Hoch and bass John Stephens. A concert announcement for 2012 indicates that the membership has not changed recently.

Its papers, music collection, and other historical documents are now held in the Music Division of the Library of Congress
