= Troubled Island =

Opera by William Grant Still

- Opera by William Grant Still
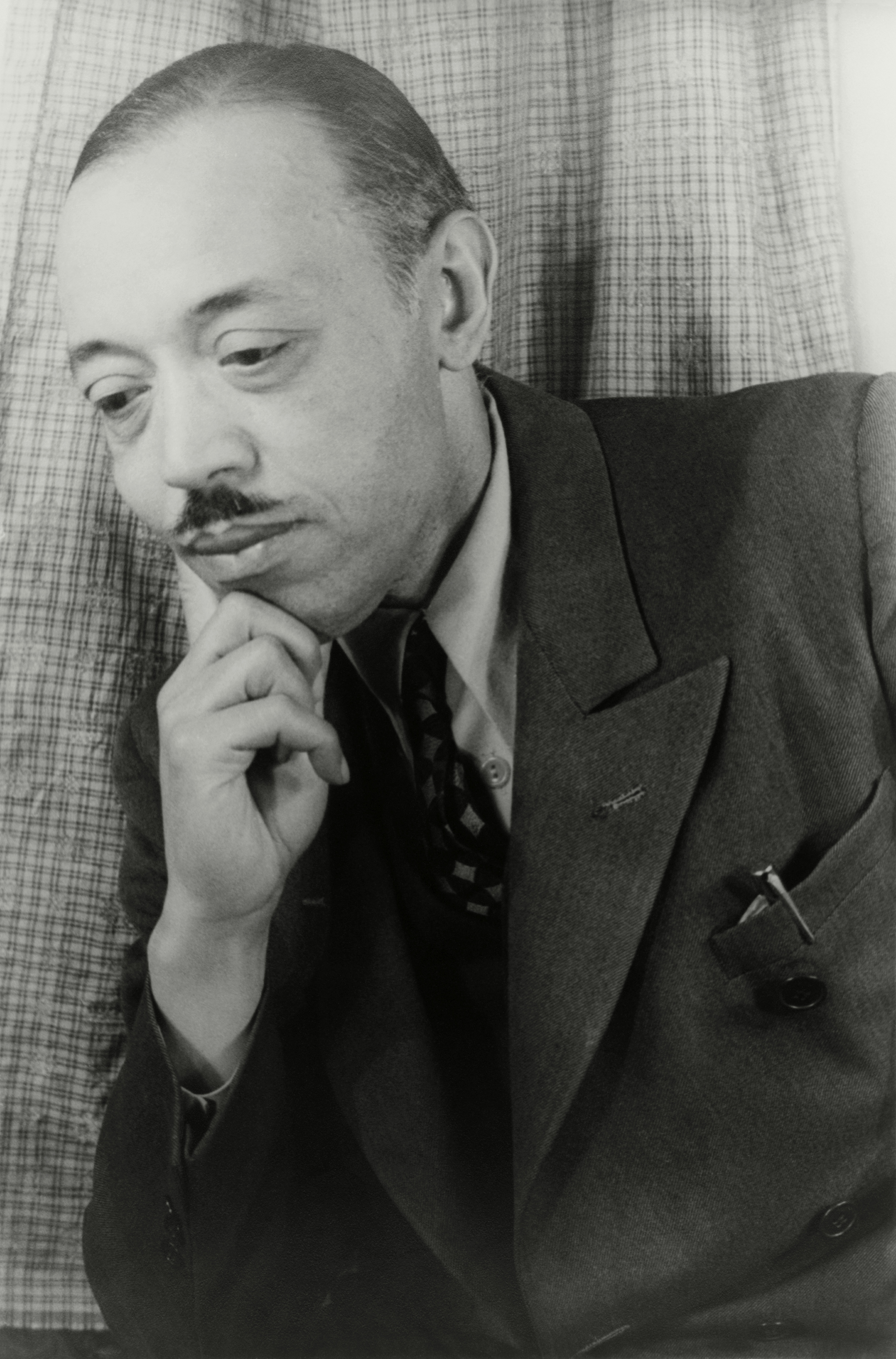
- The composer in 1949, photographed by Carl Van Vechten
- Librettist: Langston Hughes; Verna Arvey
- Language: English
- Based on: Jean Jacques Dessalines
- Premiere: March 31, 1949; New York City Opera

Troubled Island is an American opera in three acts composed by William Grant Still, with a libretto begun by poet Langston Hughes and completed by Verna Arvey. She married the composer following their collaboration.

Set in Haiti in 1791, Troubled Island portrays Jean Jacques Dessalines (1758–1806) and the Haitian Revolution. He declared himself as emperor of an independent Haiti but was assassinated by opponents. The opera premiered at the New York City Opera on March 31, 1949, notably making it the first grand opera composed by an African American to be produced by a major company. It was also the first time the New York City Opera produced an American opera.

== Composition and production history ==
Still and Hughes began writing Troubled Island in 1936, but Hughes left the project the following year to cover the Spanish Civil War for the Baltimore Afro-American. Arvey, a pianist and writer who never wrote a libretto before, completed the project in Hughes’ absence.

Troubled Island was completed in 1939, but Still faced problems in arranging for a production. Planned premieres in 1945 and 1948 at the New York City Opera were withdrawn, but the company presented the world premiere of Troubled Island on March 31, 1949. It was the first time that the work of an African-American composer was presented by a major American opera company.

Although the leading roles of Dessalines and his wife Azelia were based on black Haitians, the opera company cast white opera stars Robert Weede and Marie Powers, who wore blackface for the 1949 premiere. African-American bass-baritone Lawrence Winters took over the role of Dessalines from Weede for the second performance of the opera and continued in the role for the remainder of the production's run.

The premiere performance was greeted with 22 curtain calls. Critical reaction to the work ranged from mixed-to-negative. Time Magazine said, “Composer Still's music, sometimes lusciously scored, sometimes naively melodic, often had more prettiness than power. In all, Troubled Island had more of the souffle of operetta than the soup bone of opera.” John Briggs of the New York Post opined, “one was never sure one was hearing a first-rate performance of an inferior work or a second-rate performance of a good one,” while Miles Kastendieck, writing for both the New York Journal-American and the Christian Science Monitor, said of Still’s music: “the result is a mixture of styles signifying talent and a feel for opera but achieving little more than a suggestion of it.”

Years later, Judith Still, the daughter of Still and Arvey, said that the New York critics intentionally panned Troubled Island due to racism. “Howard Taubman (a critic and friend of Still) came to my father and said ‘Billy, because I’m your friend I think that I should tell you this – the critics have had a meeting to decide what to do about your opera. They think the colored boy has gone far enough and they have voted to pan your opera.’ And that was it. In those days, critics had that kind of influence.”

Following its premiere, New York City Opera staged two additional presentations, on April 1 and May 1 of 1949. To date, New York City Opera has never revived the work in full; however, a 60th-anniversary concert production of excerpts was presented by the company in March 2009 at the Schomburg Center for Research in Black Culture. The opera has not been seen widely outside these two productions until October 19, 2013 when the South Shore Opera Company of Chicago presented the opera in full with a black cast, black chorus and black conductor. The opera was held at the Paul Robeson Theatre of the South Shore Cultural Center.

== Roles ==
Role	Voice type	Premiere Cast, March 31, 1949 (Conductor: - Laszlo Halasz)
Dessalines, Revolution General	baritone	Robert Weede
Azelia, wife of Dessalines	contralto	Marie Powers
Celeste, a slave mother	mezzo-soprano	Muriel O'Malley
Popo, a slave	tenor	Nathaniel Sprinzena
Vuval, a mulatto	tenor	Richard Charles
Stenio, Vuval's cousin	baritone	Arthur Newman
Martel, an old man	bass	Oscar Natzka
Mamaloi, Voodoo Priestess	soprano	Ruth Stewart
Claire, the Mulatto Empress	soprano	Helena Bliss
The Steward	baritone	Edwin Dunning
The Chamberlain	bass	Richard Wentworth
The Messenger	tenor	William Stanz
The Fisherman	baritone	Edwin Dunning
The Mango Vendor	mezzo-soprano	Frances Bible
The Melon Vendor	soprano	Mary LeSawyer
The Herald	tenor	
1st Servant	soprano	Dorothy MacNeil
2nd servant	mezzo-soprano	Frances Bible
3rd servant	contralto	Rosalind Nadell
Ragamuffin boys	mute	
Slaves, Voodoo attendants, servants, guests, courtiers, market women, fishermen, peasants, soldiers, dancers, drummers	opera chorus	New York City Opera Chorus
