= Arthur Newman (baritone) =

American opera singer and actor

Arthur Newman (1908 – August 6, 2000) was an American operatic baritone and actor. He began his career as a stage actor in St. Louis in the early 1930s and in 1939 began an opera career. He was notably a member of the New York City Opera between 1945 and 1959 during which time he performed in more than 1,300 performances with the company in over 50 roles.

== Biography ==
Newman was born and raised in St. Louis, Missouri. He began his career as an actor at the Missouri Theater Company, portraying primarily nonmusical roles during the early 1930s. In the mid-1930s he started taking singing lessons with the intent of becoming an opera singer. In 1939 he joined the roster at the St. Louis Grand Opera Association. Between 1939 and 1943 he sang a number of secondary roles with the company, including parts in productions of Otello, Rigoletto, La Traviata, Tosca, Manon, Martha, and Mignon. During these years he and his wife, Helen Wright, were featured singers on the St. Louis radio station KMOX, where they presented a weekly program of vocal duets. In the early 1940s Newman also sang with the International Opera of Havana and with the St. Louis Chamber Opera.

Newman made his New York City debut on Broadway with the New Opera Company portraying Mr. Hutchinson in Jacques Offenbach's La Vie parisienne on January 12, 1945. Just a few months later he joined the roster of singers at the New York City, making his debut with the company in April 1945 as Schaunard in Giacomo Puccini's La Boheme. He maintained a busy schedule performing with the NYCO for the next fifteen years in mainly supporting comic roles like Sacristan in Tosca and Antonio in Le nozze di Figaro. Some of his other roles included Masetto in Don Giovanni, several different roles in Der Rosenkavalier, and Escamillo in Carmen. He also sang in a number of world premieres with the company, including Chennoch in David Tamkin's The Dybbuk (1951) and The Doctor in Mark Bucci's Tale for a Deaf Ear (1958).

In addition to his work with the NYCO, Newman also sang several small roles on a number of recordings for RCA, including Verdi's Otello and La Traviata with conductor Arturo Toscanini.

After Newman left the NYCO in 1959, he joined the voice faculty at Wichita State University in Kansas. He notably taught the bass Samuel Ramey during his tenure there. In 1973 Newman retired. He died in Scottsdale, Arizona at the age of 92.
