= Ruth Stewart (disambiguation) =

Ruth Stewart is a singer.

Ruth Stewart may also refer to:

- Ruth Stewart (Home and Away), Home and Away character
- Ruthie Stewart, character in Hannah Montana
- Ruth Stuart, writer
- Ruth-Marie Stewart, American skier
