= Samuel Baron =

American flutist and conductor (1925-1997)

- Born: April 27, 1925; Brooklyn, New York, United States
- Died: May 16, 1997 (aged 72) New York City
- Genres: Classical
- Occupations: Soloist, virtuoso, teacher
- Instrument: Flute

Samuel Baron (April 27, 1925 in Brooklyn, New York – May 16, 1997 in New York City, United States) was an American flutist. He studied violin in high school and then attended The Juilliard School as a flute student of Georges Barrère and Arthur Lora, graduating in 1948. While at Juilliard, Baron formed the New York Brass Ensemble, and in 1953, the group released an LP recording of seven canzonas by Giovanni Gabrielli with Baron conducting. Meanwhile, the New York Woodwind Quintet had formed in 1947, and Baron was its flutist from 1948 until 1969 and again from 1980 until 1997. With the quintet, Baron made many recordings, premiered many works, and toured widely in North and South America, Asia, and Europe. He took a leave from the ensemble to perform as principal flute with the Minneapolis Symphony (now the Minnesota Orchestra) for the 1952–53 season.

Baron was flutist for the Bach Aria Group from 1965 until 1997. When its founder, musicologist William Scheide, stepped down in 1980, Baron become the director of the group and established the Bach Aria Festival and Institute, which took place at Stony Brook University in summers from 1981 until 1997.

Several works were dedicated to Samuel Baron, including Eldin Burton's Sonatina for Flute and Piano (1948), Karl Korte's Remembrances for Flutes (Alto, Soprano, and Piccolo) and Electronics (1971), and Meyer Kupferman's Superflute for solo flute with prerecorded piccolo and alto flute (1971).

Baron taught generations of students at Stony Brook University starting in 1966, The Juilliard School starting in 1971, the Yale School of Music (1966–68), and the Mannes College of Music (1969–72).

From 1977 through 1978, Baron was president of the National Flute Association, which honored him with a Lifetime Achievement Award in 1996.

== Publications ==
Articles

- “Higher Performance Standards: The Younger Generation of Flutists,” The Instrumentalist, August 1978.
- “Introduction” to The Flute and Flute Playing by Theobald Boehm. New York: Dover Publications, 1964.
- “Practicing as a Way of Life,” Flute Talk (November 1984): pp. 18–19.
- “Reminiscences of a Golden Age – New York City (1946-1951),” The Instrumentalist, December 1987, pp. 19–24.
- “A Visit to the Japan Flute Club,” The Instrumentalist, June 1964.

Editions

- Bach, Carl Philipp Emmanuel, Sonata in A Minor, H. 562, Armstrong, 1975.
- Bach, Johann Sebastian, Sonata in A Major, BWV 1032, Oxford University Press, 1975.
- Vivaldi, Antonio, Piccolo Concerto in C Major, F. VI, No. 4, Franco Colombo Publications, 1962.

== Interviews with Samuel Baron ==
- Duffie, Bruce, “Flutist Samuel Baron: A Conversation with Bruce Duffie” http://www.bruceduffie.com/baron2.html
- Estevan, Pilar, “Samuel Baron,” in Talking With Flutists. New York: Edu-Tainment, 1978, pp. 21–36.
- Goll Wilson, Kathleen, “Samuel Baron: Observant Teacher,” Flute Talk (February 1990), pp. 9–13.
- Hansen, Polly, “Samuel Baron: Still Learning,” Flute Talk (November 1984), pp. 2–6.
- Marianello, Linda, “Our Profession’s Changing Face,” The Flutist Quarterly 22, no. 4 (Summer 1997), pp. 31–3.
