= Marjorie Fulton =

American violinist (1909–1962)

- Birth name: Marjorie McAllister Fulton
- Born: December 28, 1909; Oklahoma City
- Died: November 3, 1962 (aged 52); Dallas, Texas
- Genres: Classical
- Occupation(s): Concert artist Music school pedagog
- Instrument: violin
- Years active: 1935–1962

Marjorie Fulton (married name Marjorie Harrell; née Marjorie McAllister Fulton; December 28, 1909 — November 3, 1962) was an American concert violinist and music educator of distinction.

== Career ==
Fulton was born in Oklahoma City, where she began studying piano at age nine, in 1918. She attended the Curtis Institute of Music and held fellowships at The Juilliard School, graduating with honors in 1935. While at Curtis, Fulton met Mack Harrell who had studied violin at Oklahoma City University and was continuing violin studies at Curtis. They married in 1935 in New York City, the same year that she received her graduate diploma from Juilliard. Mack Harrell flourished as a concert and operatic baritone, notably with the Metropolitan Opera, and Fulton continued to perform and teach. One of their three children, Lynn Harrell, born in 1944, was an internationally renowned concert cellist.

Fulton had performed with many major groups around the world and had given concerts at The Town Hall (debut — 4 February 1953) and Carnegie Hall in New York City, and Jordan Hall in Boston (1936–1937).

In 1942, she was a soloist with the Naumburg Orchestral Concerts, in the Naumburg Bandshell, Central Park, in the summer series.

As a violin teacher, Fulton taught privately in Boston (from 1936 to 1937), New York, and Dallas. She had taught at the University of North Texas College of Music, beginning in 1958, and became an artist in residence there in 1960. She also had taught at the Aspen Music Festival and School where her husband was director from 1954 until his death in 1960.

== Death ==
Fulton, while on the faculty at North Texas, died in Dallas, Texas, from injuries six days after a two-vehicle crash while traveling from Denton to Fort Worth with pianist Jean Mainous to perform a recital. Two years earlier (1960), her husband, Mack Harrell had died of cancer. Modernist composer Samuel Adler, a member of the composition faculty at North Texas in 1962, dedicated his 1962 composition, Elegy for Strings, to Mrs. Marjorie Fulton Harrell. The work was performed twice in November 1962 by the Dallas Symphony Orchestra, Donald Johanos conducting.
