= Beverly Hoch =

American opera singer (born 1951)

Beverly Hoch (born August 26, 1951) is an American coloratura soprano and music educator who has had an active performance career in operas, concerts, and on recordings since the late 1970s. She has been teaching at Texas Woman's University since 2007.

== Life and career ==
Born in Marion, Kansas, Beverly is the daughter of Wharton Hoch and great-granddaughter of E. W. Hoch. Hoch earned a Bachelor of Arts degree from Friends University in 1973 before pursuing formal musical studies. She earned a Bachelor of Music degree from Oklahoma City University in 1975, and a Master of Music degree in Vocal Performance from Wichita State University in 1978 where she was a pupil of George Gibson. She also studied opera briefly at Sarah Lawrence College where she performed her first opera role, Zerlina in Don Giovanni in 1978. She studied voice privately in New York with Michael Trimble (1977–1982) and Ellen Faull (1982–1986).

Hoch won the regional division of the Metropolitan Opera National Council Auditions in 1977 before winning the Young Concert Artists contest in 1979. She made her debut at the Santa Fe Opera as Iza in La Grande-Duchesse de Gérolstein in 1979. She made her professional recital debut at the 92nd Street Y in January 1980. In his review of her performance, The New York Times music critic Donal Henahan wrote, "Miss Hoch's voice is pure and agile, which satisfies the basic requirements of a coloratura soprano, but it also has an attractive vibrato that lends itself to warmth and color. Like many coloraturas, she can use it in a precise instrumental style, and did so dazzlingly."

In 1980 Hoch portrayed the Dew Fairy in Hansel and Gretel at the Wolf Trap Opera. In 1981 she opened the Chamber Music Society of Lincoln Center's season with a concert of music by Stravinsky and Haydn at Alice Tully Hall. In 1984 she portrayed Tiny in Britten's Paul Bunyan at the Opera Theatre of Saint Louis. In 1985 she recorded the role of Clomiri in Handel's Imeneo with the Brewer Baroque Ensemble for Schwann Records.

In 1986 Hoch portrayed Olympia in The Tales of Hoffmann at the Hawaii Opera Theatre and was Philine in Mignon at the Wexford Festival Opera. In 1987 she recorded the album Great Coloratura Solos with the Hong Kong Philharmonic for MCA Records. In 1988 she appeared at the Royal Swedish Opera as the title heroine in Lucia di Lammermoor. In 1989 she portrayed the title role in Lakmé at the Arizona Opera. The following year she recorded the role of the Queen of the Night in The Magic Flute with the London Classical Players and the Schütz Choir of London for EMI.

In 1990 Hoch portrayed Ann Page in The Merry Wives of Windsor at the Washington National Opera. In 1991 she portrayed the Queen of the Night in The Magic Flute at the Glyndebourne Festival Opera. In 1992 she was a featured soloist with the American Symphony Orchestra at Carnegie Hall. Other highlights of her career include portraying Adele in Die Fledermaus at the Strasbourg Opera House, Blondchen in Die Entführung aus dem Serail at the Opéra National de Lyon, and the role of Zerbinetta in Ariadne auf Naxos in opera houses throughout Germany. As a chamber musician she frequently performed with the Bach Aria Group for many years. Additionally, Hoch was a soloist at the wedding of Caroline Kennedy to Edwin Schlossberg in 1986.

In 1997 she married jazz artist Michael Steinel.
