= Michael Trimble =

American opera singer

Michael Trimble (sometimes spelled Michael Trimbel) (March 15, 1938, Texarkana, Texas) is an American operatic tenor, voice teacher, and writer on music. He had an active international career singing leading roles with opera houses during the 1960s and 1970s. His singing career was cut short due to health concerns, and he has since had an active career as a voice teacher both privately and at the Cleveland Institute of Music, the University of Texas at Austin, and the Aspen Music Festival and School. Several of his students have had successful international opera careers, including Metropolitan Opera star Tonio di Paolo and soprano Beverly Hoch.

== Life and career ==
Trimble earned a bachelor's degree in music from Southern Methodist University where he was a pupil of Mack Harrell. In 1962 he made his professional debut at the Dallas Opera as Roderigo in Otello with Mario Del Monaco in the title role. In 1963 he won the Metropolitan Opera National Council Auditions. In 1964 he portrayed Edgardo in nationally broadcast production of Lucia di Lammermoor with the NBC Opera Theatre. He made his European debut soon after as Cavaradossi in Puccini's Tosca with the Teatro Nuovo in Milan.

In the 1960s and early 1970s Trimble was highly active singing leading roles with several German, Austrian, and Swiss opera houses, including the Badisches Staatstheater Karlsruhe, the Bern Theatre, the Deutsche Oper Berlin, the Hessisches Staatstheater Wiesbaden, the Opern- und Schauspielhaus Frankfurt, and the Vienna Volksoper among others. He made his debut with the Canadian Opera Company in 1971 as Pinkerton to Maria Pellegrini's Cio-Cio-San under conductor Alfred Strombergs. In 1974 he made his debut at the Opera Company of Boston as Toby Higgins in Rise and Fall of the City of Mahagonny under conductor Sarah Caldwell.
