= Robert McFerrin =

American opera singer (1921–2006)

Robert McFerrin Sr.
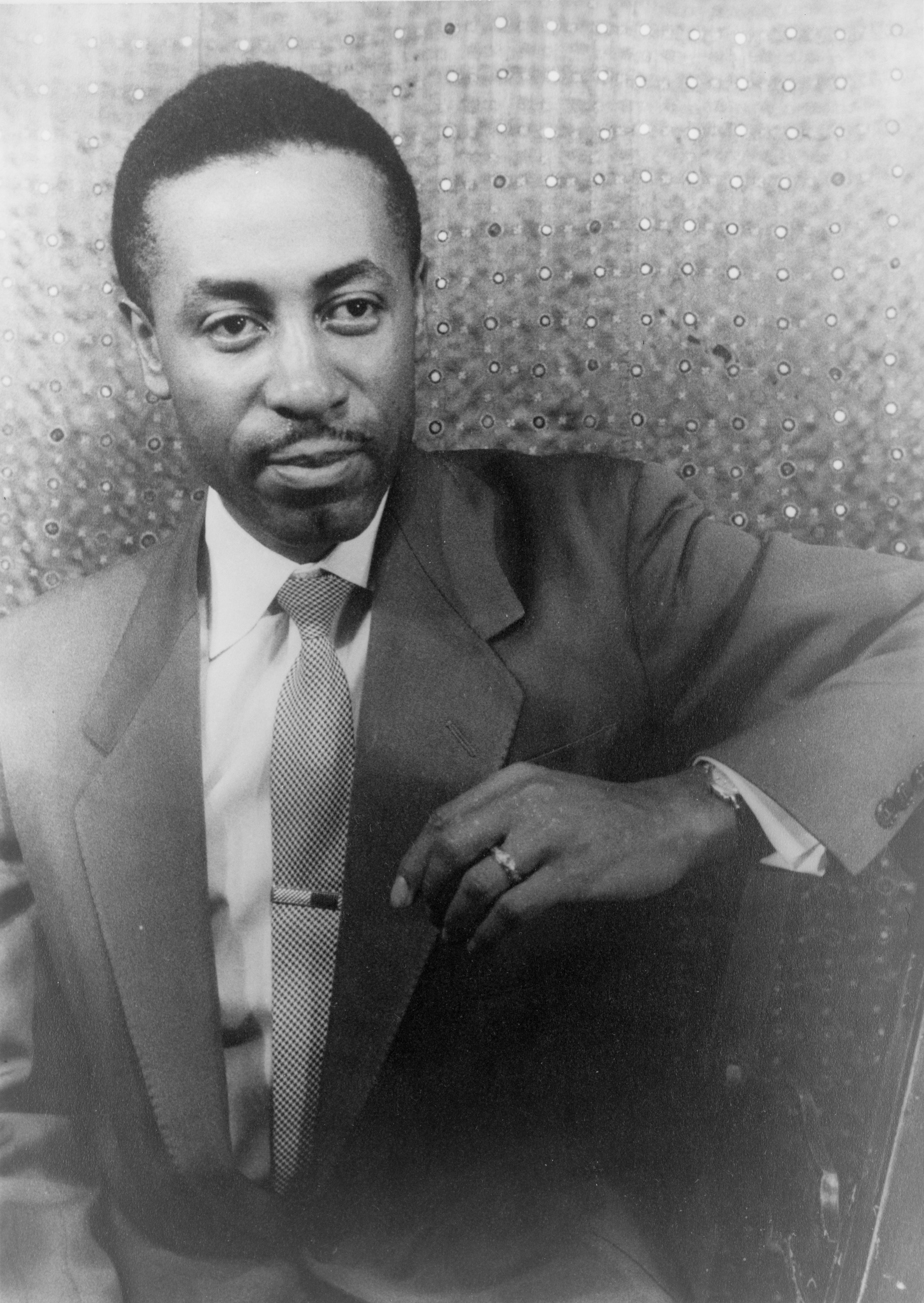
- McFerrin, photographed by Carl Van Vechten, 1955

Background information
- Born: Robert Keith McFerrin; March 19, 1921; Marianna, Arkansas, U.S.
- Died: November 24, 2006 (aged 85) St. Louis, Missouri, U.S.
- Genre: Classical
- Occupation: Singer

Robert Keith McFerrin Sr. (March 19, 1921 – November 24, 2006) was an American operatic baritone, notable for being the first African-American man to sing at the Metropolitan Opera in New York City. His voice was described by critic Albert Goldberg in the Los Angeles Times as "a baritone of beautiful quality, even in all registers, and with a top that partakes of something of a tenor's ringing brilliance."

McFerrin was the father of Grammy Award-winning vocalist Bobby McFerrin.

== Early years ==
Born in Marianna, Arkansas, McFerrin showed vocal talent at an early age, singing while still a boy soprano in a local church's gospel choir. As a young teenager he joined two of his siblings in a trio. The three accompanied their father on regional preaching engagements, singing gospel songs, hymns and spirituals. Reverend McFerrin did not wish his son to sing secular music, but in the end this wish was undone by his desire to give him the best possible education.

After McFerrin completed the eighth grade in Memphis, his father sent him to live with his aunt and uncle in St. Louis so he could attend Sumner High School. There, his musical horizons widened. He joined the choir and impressed the director, Wirt Walton, sufficiently that he began teaching McFerrin privately. Walton also arranged for McFerrin's first vocal recital to help him earn funds for his college enrollment.

== Further studies ==
Graduating from high school in 1940, McFerrin enrolled at Fisk University in Nashville, Tennessee. Following his freshman year, he won a scholarship to attend Chicago Musical College and transferred to that institution. World War II and the draft interrupted McFerrin's schooling, but he returned to Chicago Musical College after discharge from the U.S. Army as a technician fifth grade and received his degree in 1948.

== Early career ==
In 1948, McFerrin moved to New York City and began receiving vocal coaching from Hall Johnson, composer and choir director.

McFerrin married Sara Copper, another aspiring singer, in 1949. The couple had two children, Robert Jr. (Bobby) and Brenda.

In New York, McFerrin's singing career prospered. A 1949 appearance in a small role in the Kurt Weill Broadway musical Lost in the Stars led to acquaintance with Boris Goldovsky. Goldovsky presented McFerrin in the title role of Rigoletto at the Tanglewood Music Festival in 1949 and cast him in his company, the New England Opera Theater (later the Goldovsky Opera Theater), as Valentin in Faust and in Iphigénie en Tauride by Gluck. That year he also performed as Amonasro in Aida with the National Negro Opera Company and made his New York City Opera debut, singing the role of Popaloi, a voodoo doctor, in the premiere of William Grant Still's Haitian opera Troubled Island.

In 1950 McFerrin sang the title role in Rigoletto with the New England Opera. Moving between opera and Broadway, in 1951 he performed in a revival of The Green Pastures, and the following year he sang in My Darlin' Aida, a version of Verdi's Aida updated to 1861 and set in Memphis, Tennessee. He also returned to the National Negro Opera Company in 1952 to sing Valentin in Faust.

== The Metropolitan Opera ==
McFerrin had distinguished himself in singing competitions earlier in life, but in 1953 he eclipsed these honors by winning the Metropolitan Opera's "Auditions of the Air", the first African-American to do so. During this time, it was usual for the winner of the "Auditions of the Air" to receive six months' training and a contract to sing at the Met. McFerrin received 13 months' training, but did not receive a contract. Helen L. Phillips, an African-American lyric soprano who had sung as a substitute chorus member for a Met Opera in 1947, is the only known African-American singer to precede him.

In 1950 the Metropolitan Opera came under the leadership of Rudolf Bing, who was determined to formally integrate the Met's casting of singers. Marian Anderson made history during Bing's tenure as the first African-American lead hired to sing on the Met stage. McFerrin followed with his Met debut in the same month, on January 27, 1955. Thus, McFerrin became the first black man to sing at the Metropolitan Opera. Rarely stated in the great publicity surrounding Anderson's accomplishment is the fact that McFerrin was already engaged to make his debut when she received her contract. With his Rigoletto in 1956, McFerrin became the first African-American in history to sing a title role at the Met. He was also the first African-American to sing at both the Metropolitan Opera and New York City Opera. He achieved the same distinction with his Rigoletto in Naples at the San Carlo Opera in 1956.

McFerrin's debut role at the Met was Amonasro, the Ethiopian king, in Aida. He sang for three years at the Metropolitan Opera, seven times as Amonasro, once as Valentin in Faust and twice in the title role of Rigoletto.

Concerned with the uncertainty of his future in New York, McFerrin resigned his position at the Met in favor of his chances in Hollywood. After 1958, he did not appear at the Metropolitan Opera.

== California ==
McFerrin went to California in 1958 to work on the Otto Preminger movie Porgy and Bess. The casting plans for this production of the George Gershwin opera slated Sidney Poitier as Porgy. Poitier was to act the role onscreen and lip-synch the musical numbers. McFerrin was engaged to provide Porgy's singing voice. The McFerrins settled in Hollywood that year so that McFerrin could begin working with Sidney Poitier. When the movie was released in 1959, the New York Times stated that, like Poitier's acting, McFerrin's singing was "as sensitive and strong as one could wish." The soundtrack was released as an LP.

McFerrin and his wife set up a vocal studio in Los Angeles and began teaching. In 1959, McFerrin was engaged to teach singing lessons at the Sibelius Academy in Helsinki, and later he became a voice teacher at Sacramento State College. While they were living in California, the McFerrins' marriage ended in divorce. McFerrin credited his ex-wife with helping to support the family while he was beginning his career. She also played as his piano accompanist and helped him learn new music at the keyboard.

After 15 years in California, McFerrin moved to St. Louis, Missouri.

After their divorce, Sara McFerrin was a music professor at Fullerton College, in Fullerton, California, from 1973 to 1993, serving as chair of the music and voice departments.

== Later years ==
In 1973, McFerrin returned to St Louis, where he had attended high school; it remained his primary residence for the rest of his life. He accepted an appointment as artist-in-residence at the St. Louis Institute of Music Conservatory, both performing and teaching.

During these years, he sang in public with his children. Bobby and Brenda had grown up in a household where music was a major topic of conversation, and where, as Bobby McFerrin recalls, "there was all kinds of music." Both Bobby and Brenda became professional singers, though they chose not to follow their parents' footsteps into the classical field. Bobby became a non-classical singer, conductor, composer and Grammy Award winner. Calling herself a consumer vocalist, Brenda pursued a career as a Motown recording artist. The three sang in 1987 at a benefit concert for the McFerrin Endowment for Minority Artist at the Sheldon Concert Hall.

Although McFerrin sustained a stroke in 1989 which affected his speech, he remained able to sing. In 1993, he appeared with his son and the St. Louis Symphony; Bobby conducted and McFerrin senior sang.

McFerrin married his second wife, Athena Bush, in 1995.

McFerrin was twice awarded honorary doctorates: in 1987 from Stowe Teacher's College, St. Louis, and in 1989 from the University of Missouri-St. Louis. In 2003, Opera America, in conjunction with the Association of U.S. and International Professional Opera Companies and Opera Volunteers International, honored McFerrin with a Lifetime Achievement Award. He is commemorated by a brass star and bronze plaque embedded in the St. Louis Walk of Fame.

McFerrin suffered a heart attack on November 24, 2006, and died in St. Louis at the age of 85. He is buried at Jefferson Barracks National Cemetery.

== Role model ==
McFerrin's accomplishments as a black man in the field of classical singing served as an inspiration to singers of color who followed, especially men. Upon McFerrin's death, the African-American tenor George Shirley wrote, "Robert McFerrin Sr.'s heart was that of a giant; as one of the world's greatest singers and courageous pioneers, he instilled within me and countless other black males the resolve to pursue our destinies as performers in the profession of grand opera. In spite of the personal hardships he endured, his magnificent voice retained its amazing power and beauty well into his 8th decade..."

His son, Bobby McFerrin, said in an interview, "His work influenced everything I do musically. When I direct a choir, I go for his sound. His musical influence was absolutely profound. I cannot do anything without me hearing his voice."

== Recordings ==
McFerrin was called "under-recorded" by Opera News. The following is a list of known recordings.

- Excerpts from Rigoletto, for the Metropolitan Opera Club (1956). His "Cortigiani" with Fausto Cleva conducting, called "consummate," was also later released in 2001 by the Metropolitan Opera Guild in a collection called Met Stars Sing Verdi (see below under external links).
- Aida, live recording, with the Teatro San Carlo (1956). This recording, conducted by Vincenzo Bellezza, was originally identified as "The Golden Age of Opera GAO 130."
- Porgy and Bess, LP soundtrack of the 1959 movie, Columbia OL 5410
- "Deep River" and Other Classic Negro Spirituals (June 1957)
- Let's Learn a New Song, a children's album recorded in the 1960s
- Medicine Music, EMI Records (USA), UPC: 077779204823, released 1990. This CD is a Bobby McFerrin release in which he sings the song "Discipline" with his father, Robert McFerrin Sr.
- Classic Negro Spirituals, with Norman Johnson, Piano. Washington Records, 235 West 46th Street, New York, New York, 1959.
