= Mack Harrell =

American baritone (1909–1960)

- Born: Mack Kendree Harrell Jr. October 9, 1909; Celeste, Texas, U.S.
- Died: January 29, 1960 (aged 50); Dallas, Texas, U.S.
- Occupations: Operatic baritone, music educator
- Years active: 1938–1960
- Organizations: Metropolitan Opera, Chicago Opera Company, New York City Opera, San Francisco Opera, SMU, Aspen Music Festival and School

Mack Kendree Harrell, Jr. (October 8, 1909 — January 29, 1960) was an American operatic and concert baritone vocalist who was regarded as one of the greatest American-born lieder singers of his generation.

== Growing up ==
Harrell was born in Celeste, Texas, to Asbury Mack Kendree Harrell (1857–1915) and Mollie Harrell, (née Virginia Marr Kelly; 1863–1935). The youngest of two brothers and a sister, he was raised and educated in Greenville, Texas. He studied violin from the age of ten and continued for twelve years. One of his brothers, Lynn Mozart Harrell (1902–1987), had been a big band pianist with the Jimmy Joy Orchestra while a student at The University of Texas at Austin in the 1920s.

== Post baccalaureate education ==
Harrell studied the violin at Oklahoma City University. Later, he was awarded a scholarship to attend Philadelphia's Curtis Institute of Music where he studied violin under Emanuel Zetlin. He met his wife, violinist Marjorie Fulton, while they were both students at the Curtis Institute. It was at the Curtis Institute that the quality of his bass voice was discovered, after which he left Curtis for The Juilliard School to study singing with Anna E. Schoen-René (1864–1942), who had been a pupil of Pauline Viardot-Garcia and Manuel Garcia. Harrell believed that his experience of musical studies as a violinist first made him a better singer than he might have been otherwise.

In 1939, Harrell's book, The Sacred Hour of Song: A Collection of Sacred Solos Suitable for Christian Science Services, was published by C. Fischer.

== Professional career ==
Harrell made his concert debut at New York City's Town Hall singing a recital of opera and lieder in 1938. That same year he won the Metropolitan Opera's Audition of the Air competition (precursor to the National Council Auditions) which led to Edward Johnson offering him a contract with the company. Harrell made his professional opera debut at the Met on December 16, 1939, as Biterolf in Richard Wagner's Tannhäuser. He sang with the company every year through 1948, and returned for the 1949–1950, 1952–1954, and 1957–1958 seasons. Among the many roles he portrayed at the Met are Amfortas in Parsifal, Baron Douphol in La Traviata, Captain Balstrode in Peter Grimes, Dancaïre in Carmen, Dodon in Le Coq d'Or, Fiorello in Il Barbiere di Siviglia, Frédéric in Lakmé, Herald in Lohengrin, Kothner in Die Meistersinger von Nürnberg, Lindorf in Les Contes d'Hoffmann, Masetto in Don Giovanni, Papageno in Die Zauberflöte, Peter in Hänsel und Gretel, Shchelkalov in Boris Godunov, and Wolfram in Tannhäuser among others.

He notably created the role of Samson in the world premiere of Bernard Rogers's The Warrior opposite Regina Resnik as Delilah at the Met on January 11, 1947. He also portrayed Nick Shadow in The Rake’s Progress for the work's US premiere at the Met in February 1953. After 1954, Harrell returned to the Met only one more time during his career to portray Jochanaan in Richard Strauss's Salome in 1958. His final and 156th performance at the Met was as Jochanaan on February 17, 1958, with Inge Borkh as Salome.

While performing at the Met, Harrell also maintained an active concert career, and in 1944 he gave the world premiere of Arnold Schoenberg's Ode to Napoleon Buonaparte (1942) for speaker, string orchestra and piano. Harrell performed roles with a number of other opera companies as well. In 1940 he sang Alfio in Cavalleria rusticana and Ford in Verdi's Falstaff in Chicago. In May 1944 he made his first appearance at the New York City Opera (NYCO) as Germont in La Traviata, and returned in 1948, 1951–1952, and 1959. At the NYCO he notably portrayed the role of Rabbi Azrael in the world premiere of David Tamkin's The Dybbuk (1951) and Pierre Cauchon in the premiere of the one act version of Norman Dello Joio's The Triumph of St. Joan (1959). In September 1945 Harrell made his debut with the San Francisco Opera portraying Escamillo in Carmen. He sang several more roles with that company during the 1945–1946 season, including the Commissioner in Der Rosenkavalier, Dapertutto in Les Contes d'Hoffmann, Fernando in Fidelio, Germont, Marcello in La bohème, Ramiro in L'heure espagnole, and Silvio in Pagliacci among others. In 1952 he portrayed Christopher Columbus in the United States premiere of Darius Milhaud's Christophe Colomb at Carnegie Hall. In 1955, he portrayed Olin Blitch in the world premiere of Carlisle Floyd's Susannah at Florida State University opposite Phyllis Curtin in the title role. In 1956 he played the role of Saul in the United States premiere of Milhaud's David at the Hollywood Bowl, opposite Herva Nelli.

In 1944 his son, the celebrated cellist Lynn Harrell, was born. From 1945 to 1956 Harrell taught voice at The Juilliard School and from 1957 to 1960 he taught at Southern Methodist University, after moving to Dallas. In 1954 he succeeded Walter Paepcke as the second director of the Aspen Music Festival and School, a position he held until his death in 1960; Harrell had been one of the founders of Aspen. His pupils included singers William Blankenship, Michael Trimble, and Barry McDaniel. Harrell died in Dallas, aged 50.
