= Paul Ulanowsky =

Austrian-American pianist and music educator

External audio
- Shellac recordings with Paul Ulanowsky in the Online Archive of the Österreichische Mediathek

Paul Alexander Theodore Ulanowsky (March 4, 1908, Vienna – August 4, 1968, New York, NY) was an Austrian-American pianist, accompanist, vocal coach, and music educator of Austrian Jewish and Ukrainian-Jewish descent. He began his career as the pianist for the Vienna Philharmonic from 1927 to 1935. He then embarked on a long career as an accompanist, notably enjoying a particularly close relationship with soprano Lotte Lehmann during the last fourteen years of her career. He played in concerts with many of the world's best singers and instrumentalists during the 1940s and 1950s.

Ulanowsky lived in the United States from the late 1930s on. He began a highly successful teaching career in the 1950s, serving on the faculties at the Berkshire Music Center and Boston University. During the 1960s he was active as a teacher at the University of Illinois at Urbana-Champaign and the Yale School of Music.

== Early life and education ==
Born in Vienna, into a Jewish family, Ulanowsky's father was from the small village of Mokraya Kaligorka in Central Ukraine. His father had worked as an opera singer at the Prague State Opera before moving to Austria where he was honored with the title of Kammersänger. His mother, Lili Glaubauf, also had a career as a classical singer and had studied voice with his father before the couple married in 1906. As a young child Ulanowsky began learning music from his parents and before the age of 10 was already accompanying his mother and his father's students in performances.

From 1924 to 1926, Ulanowsky received his formal training at the University of Music and Performing Arts, Vienna with pianist Severin Eisenberger and composer Joseph Marx. He also took private lessons in violin and viola. After earning a diploma in piano performance, he pursued graduate work at the University from 1926 to 1930 in musicology, composition, and conducting where his instructors included Guido Adler, William Adler, and Rudolf von Ficker. He earned diplomas in composition and conducting in 1930 at which time he was offered a conducting post in Poland; an offer he declined. He was later honored with an honorary doctorate from the University of Cincinnati College-Conservatory of Music.

== Performance career ==
While a student, Ulanowsky became the official pianist and celesta player for the Vienna Philharmonic in 1927 at the young age of 19. He served in that post for the next eight years, notably playing the celesta solo in Gustav Mahler's Das Lied von der Erde for the orchestra's recording of the work under conductor Bruno Walter. In 1935 he became the accompanist for renowned contralto Enid Szánthó. In addition to performing with her in concerts in Europe, he toured with Szantho to the United States several times from 1935 to 1937.

In the spring of 1937, the soprano Lotte Lehmann attended one of Szantho and Ulanowsky's concerts. Moved by Ulanowsky's playing, she approached him after the concert to come and audition for her. He complied and, after playing just a few measures of a few different songs, she engaged him on the spot to be her accompanist for her first Australian tour that coming summer. It was the beginning of a long partnership between the two which lasted until Lehmann's retirement 14 years later. Ulanowsky remained her only accompanist during these years, performing with her in concerts around the world and in masterclasses.

Ulanowsky also occasionally collaborated with other artists. He accompanied cellist Gregor Piatigorsky for his performance at the White House with President and Mrs. Franklin D. Roosevelt and guests in attendance. Elisabeth Schwarzkopf gave her first master class with Ulanowsky at the piano. She said of the event, "Without his calm assistance, I don't know how I would have made it through." Other artists with whom he performed included, William Kroll, Bernard Greenhouse, Joseph Fuchs, Dietrich Fischer-Dieskau, Ernst Haefliger, George London, Hans Hotter, Jennie Tourel, Hermann Prey, Irmgard Seefried, and Aksel Schiotz among others. Beginning in 1956 until his death twelve years later, he was the pianist for the famous Bach Aria Group.

== Teaching career ==
Ulanowsky also worked as a teacher of piano and a vocal coach. In the summers he taught at the Berkshire Music Center at the Tanglewood Music Festival in Massachusetts from 1950 to 1956. Two of his students at Tanglewood were mezzo-soprano Betty Allen and conductor Eve Queler. He was a faculty member at the music conservatory at Boston University from 1951 to 1955. During the 1960s he taught at the University of Illinois at Urbana-Champaign and spent several summers teaching and performing at the Yale School of Music.
