= Ruth Stewart =

American opera singer

Ruth Stewart (October 20, 1916 - April 9, 2018) was an American operatic soprano.

== Career ==
Ruth C. Stewart, a native of Jacksonville, Florida, graduated from Florida A & M University, Tallahassee in 1937. After teaching in public school in Kingsland, Georgia, she won a teaching fellowship to study at Hampton Institute, Virginia, where she received her master's degree in 1943. In the fall of 1943, she went to New York City to continue the study of voice at Teachers College, Columbus University. While in New York, she studied voice with the late Harry Robert Wilson, Rosalie Miller and Maestro Solon Alberti. She was a soloist at the Grace Congregational Church, regularly performed with the Cosmopolitan Little Symphony conductor Everett Lee, and had a lead role as Mamaloi the Voodoo Priestess in the world premiere of William Grant Still's Troubled Island on March 31, 1949 at the City Opera Company, New York City.

From 1945 to 1951, she performed extensively throughout the United States. On the tour, she gave a memorable concert during the summer school session in the Fairchild Building at Texas State University for Negroes, as it was known then.

In 1951, Ruth Stewart received two Fulbright scholarships to pursue a voice major at St. Cecelia Conservatory, Rome with maestra Marie Teresa Pediconi. During her studies at the Conservatory she concretized throughout Italy and Switzerland.

After the first of the five concerts given for Count Guido Chigi-Saracini at the Chigiana Academy, Siena, one critic wrote that "Ruth Stewart immediately won the admiration of the public with her extraordinary personality. Gifted with a voice of rare beauty, this artist gave impressive interpretations while remaining very faithful to the spirit of the works presented. After the "Aufdem Wasser zu Singen", the applause of the audience was an enthusiastic triumph for the singer, who was repeatedly called to the stage with expressions of admiration." Following the concert in Bordighera, Italy, another critic wrote that "At the end of the concert the public, moved, gave a prolonged applause, and it seemed as if they wanted to embrace her."

Ruth Stewart joined Texas Southern University in the spring of 1954 as an instructor of voice, director of the Women's Glee Club and later became co-director of the Opera Workshop.

In 1965, with the assistance of Mr. Clifford Smith, a local electrical contractor, she organized and conducted the highly successful choral group The Men of Houston, made up of many fine singers in the community. When Mrs. Ruthabel Rollins began the annual spring choir concert tours, Ms. Stewart traveled with the organization presenting the Opera Workshop as an important segment of the tours.

Stewart was a member of the National Association of Teachers of Singing, and from 1974 to 1978, she was elected Regional Governor, serving Texas, New Mexico and Oklahoma.

Ms. Stewart has many students who have gone on to successful careers in teaching and performing. Among those who have achieved success are Faye Robinson, internationally acclaimed soprano; Gloria Harrison-Quinlan, soprano; the late Lionel Stubblefield, tenor, who had a great career despite his short life, Faye Volcy, soprano, awarding winning choral director and April Sloan-Hubert, Houston's premier soprano.

During her tenure at Texas Southern University, Ms. Stewart was presented in many concerts in the local high schools and churches. She also served as clinician for schools and music festivals including the Rocky Mountain Festival, sponsored by Colorado State University, Ft. Collins. On March 7, 1978, she was invited to conduct the college choir for the inauguration of Rutherford H. Adkins, the twelfth president of Knoxville College, Tennessee.

From 1979 to 1983, she conducted the choir at Augustana Lutheran Church, where Ruthabel Rollins was organist until her death in 1982.

During her 29-year tenure at Texas Southern University she co-produced several operas, including Cavalleria rusticana, Madama Butterfly, La bohème, Amahl and the Night Visitors, The King and I, Requiem (Verdi), and Messiah (Handel).

Ruth Stewart retired on May 31, 1983. The modern facility, which houses the Music Department, has now been designated as the Rollins-Stewart Music Building in honor of her tenure. Subsequent to her retirement, she has joined Salem Lutheran Church.
