= Troilus and Cressida (opera) =

Opera by William Walton

- Opera by William Walton
- Librettist: Christopher Hassall
- Language: English
- Premiere: 3 December 1954; Royal Opera House

Troilus and Cressida is the first of the two operas by William Walton, and was premiered in 1954. The libretto was by Christopher Hassall, his own first opera libretto, based on Geoffrey Chaucer's poem Troilus and Criseyde. Walton dedicated the score to his wife, Susana.

== Composition history ==
The genesis of the opera dated back to the mid-1940s, after the success of Benjamin Britten's first great operatic success, Peter Grimes. Walton intended to counter this work with an opera of his own, and Alice Wimborne, Walton's companion at the time, suggested the story of Troilus and Cressida as a subject. Wimborne had suggested Christopher Hassall as librettist, in spite of the fact that he had never written an opera libretto. During the course of composition, Walton and Hassell carried out an extensive correspondence. Walton edited passages by Hassall from the libretto that he deemed inappropriate, or in his own coined term, "Novelloismo". (Note: Hassall had written the words for several of Ivor Novello's romantic Ruritanian musical comedies.) The opera took seven years to complete.

== Performance history ==
The opera was first produced at the Royal Opera House, London, on 3 December 1954 conducted by Sir Malcolm Sargent, and directed by George Devine. It was only a moderate success, and various factors were proposed to assess blame for the lacklustre performance, including the conductor not having thoroughly learned the score in advance.

The US première took place on 7 October 1955 at San Francisco Opera, conducted by Erich Leinsdorf, with Walton in attendance. The cast included Richard Lewis as Troilus, Dorothy Kirsten as Cressida, Giorgio Tozzi as Calkas, Carl Palangi as Antenor, Ernest McChesney as Pandarus, and Frances Bible as Evadne. The New York premiere was presented by New York City Opera on 21 October 1955. La Scala Milan staged the work in January 1956. Covent Garden revived the piece in 1963, with Sargent again conducting.

The Australian premiere was in March 1964, a highlight of the Adelaide Festival, with Richard Lewis and Marie Collier and the South Australian Symphony Orchestra under Joseph Post.

== Reception ==
Contemporary criticism of the libretto from Dyneley Hussey, just after the premiere, spoke highly of the libretto's construction, but also noted that the plot began slowly and could have used dramatic tightening in Act I. Other criticisms of the opera have spoken of a lack of sufficient dramatic tension and also Walton resorting to repeated use of past stylistic mannerisms. In his contemporary review of the work, Donald Mitchell noted the overall competence and craft of the opera, and at the same time its overall indebtedness to the style of Richard Wagner, summarizing briefly: "Walton only achieves his success at the expense of his individuality."

Defenders of the opera have noted that at the time of the premiere, the mid-1950s, music in a more conventionally tonal idiom, such as Walton's, was frowned upon during an era when serialism was more dominant in modern music. Walton himself later commented on the problematic fate of the opera as follows, as quoted in a 2002 retrospective article: "I was trying to write a romantic opera, Pucciniesque. I felt that opera should have tunes to sing. Unfortunately, I don't seem to have ever found the voices that I dreamt I would."

== Revisions ==
In 1976, Walton prepared an edition of the opera for Janet Baker to sing in a Covent Garden production; parts of the score were transposed down to accommodate the lower tessitura of Baker's voice as compared to that of Elisabeth Schwarzkopf, for whom the role was conceived. Walton also made cuts to the score. A commercial recording was released based on these live Covent Garden performances. For a 1995 production at Opera North, a new edition was commissioned, edited by Stuart Hutchinson, which restored the soprano register and restored the music cut by Walton in 1976. For its 2008 production, Opera Theatre of Saint Louis commissioned a new performing edition with both the original soprano register and a reduced orchestration.

== Roles ==
Roles, voice types, premiere cast
Role	Voice type	Premiere cast, 3 December 1954 Conductor: Sir Malcolm Sargent
Cressida, Trojan priestess, daughter of Calkas	soprano (mezzo-soprano in 1976 revision)	Magda László
Troilus, Prince of Troy, son of King Priam	tenor	Richard Lewis
Calkas, high priest of Pallas Athene, father to Cressida	bass	Frederick Dalberg
Antenor, Trojan captain	baritone	Geraint Evans
Evadne, servant to Cressida	mezzo-soprano	Monica Sinclair
Pandarus, brother to Calkas	tenor	Peter Pears
Horaste, friend to Pandarus	bass	Forbes Robinson
Diomede, Greek prince of Argos	baritone	Otakar Kraus

== Synopsis ==
Place: Troy
Time: The tenth year of the Trojan War

=== Act 1 ===
Calkas announces to the people that the oracle at Delphi has conveyed signs that Greece will prevail in the conflict. The Trojan people refuse to accept this interpretation of the oracle and are suspicious of Calkas. Antenor demands proof, but Troilus defends Calkas from the crowd. Cressida, a priestess in the temple of Pallas Athene and daughter of Calkas, then receives declarations of love from Troilus, whom she has noticed prior, but she retreats into the temple. Pandarus, uncle to Cressida, has overheard this conversation and offers his services to further Troilus's romantic cause. Evadne then brings the news that Calkas has defected to the Greek side. Pandarus then finds Cressida in tears, and tells her that the protection of a prince might be helpful to her. Troilus comes in with the news that Antenor has been captured, and that he must be retrieved by any means necessary. They look for Calkas to ask his blessing for such an enterprise, but Calkas is absent, and they go in search of him. Pandarus then pleads Troilus's case with Cressida, and she becomes sympathetic. She gives Pandarus her red scarf to give to Troilus as a pledge of her affection, and he invites her to his residence the next evening. Troilus returns to the temple, aware of Calkas's betrayal, and receives an initial sign of Cressida's approval.

=== Act 2 ===
Scene 1: The next evening, at the house of Pandarus

Cressida and Horaste are at a game of chess. As all are about to go home, a storm is on the horizon. Pandarus persuades Cressida and her company, including Evadne, to stay the night. He then secretly sends a messenger to bring Troilus to his house. As Cressida is about to retire, Troilus enters the house. He reaffirms his love for her, and she reciprocates. They leave to a side chamber, and their love scene is depicted in the orchestra.

Scene 2: The next morning, same as in Scene 1

Troilus and Cressida are about to part. Pandarus then enters to tell the news that Greek soldiers are on his grounds, and that Troilus must hide. There is to be a prisoner exchange, with Cressida going to the Greeks and Antenor to be returned to the Trojans. Diomede enters and demands to see Cressida. Pandarus denies her presence, but Diomede discovers her behind a curtain. Her beauty immediately strikes him, and he orders her to prepare for the journey. After all parties have left, Troilus emerges from hiding, and the two lovers acknowledge fate. Troilus promises that he will bribe the sentries to be able to meet her, and that she should look for him at one end of the Greek camp. He returns the red scarf, the token of their love.

=== Act 3 ===
The Greek camp, ten weeks later

Cressida has still not heard anything from Troilus. Cressida asks Evadne to await a messenger, but Evadne has been secretly destroying Troilus's messages on orders from Calkas. Evadne urges Cressida to accept Diomede as suitor, but Cressida strongly refuses. Calkas further rebukes Cressida for continuing to refuse Diomede. Diomede appears, and at his final proposal after Cressida has still not heard anything from Troilus, she yields to Diomede's entreaties. Diomede asks of her the red scarf as a token of her pledge.

Troilus and Pandarus then appear with the news that they have arranged for a ransom for Cressida, during a truce in the hostilities. Cressida says that they are too late, and the Greeks then appear to hail Cressida, betrothed to Diomede. Diomede bears the red scarf, which Troilus recognizes. Troilus claims Cressida as his. Diomede asks Cressida to denounce Troilus, but she cannot. Troilus then challenges Diomede, and they engage in single combat. As Troilus is about to overpower Diomede, Calkas stabs Troilus in the back. Troilus dies in Cressida's arms. Diomede orders Troilus to be borne back to Troy in honour, Calkas to be returned to Troy in chains, and Cressida to remain with the Greeks as an unprivileged prisoner. Left alone, Cressida finds Troilus's sword and conceals it. As the Greeks come to take her away, she pledges her loyalty one last time to Troilus, and stabs herself.

== Recordings ==
- His Master's Voice SLS 997: Janet Baker, Richard Cassilly, Gerald English, Benjamin Luxon, Richard van Allan, Elizabeth Bainbridge; Chorus and Orchestra of the Royal Opera House, Covent Garden; Lawrence Foster, conductor (version for mezzo-soprano)
- Chandos CHAN 9370 (1995): Judith Howarth, Arthur Davies, Nigel Robson, Alan Opie, Clive Bayley; Chorus of Opera North; English Northern Philharmonia; Richard Hickox, conductor (version for soprano)

== Notes, references and sources ==
=== Sources ===
- Tierney, Neil (1984). William Walton: His Life and Music. London: Robert Hale. ISBN 978-0-70-901784-4.
