= Musical Comedy Time =

Musical Comedy Time is an anthology television series broadcast on CBS from October 2, 1950, to March 19, 1951, alternating with Robert Montgomery Presents on Mondays from 9:30 to 10:30 p.m. Eastern Time. It was the first television program to feature televised adaptations of musical theatre works from the Broadway stage. These adaptations were abridged versions of the musicals and only presented part of the work to fit within a television series's time limits.

Regulars on the show were The Ken Christie Singers, The Kevin Jonson Dancers, and the Harry Sosnik Orchestra.

The premiere broadcast on October 2, 1950, broadcast twice monthly, featured a television adaptation of Cole Porter's Anything Goes with Ethel Merman reprising her role from the original 1934 Broadway production. The November 13, 1950, episode presented an adaptation of Rio Rita, starring Bert Wheeler, Patricia Morison, and Hal LeRoy. Other adaptations included Babes in Toyland, Miss Liberty, and Louisiana Purchase.
