= Laszlo Halasz (conductor) =

American conductor (1905–2001)

Laszlo Halasz (6 June 1905 in Debrecen – 26 October 2001 in Port Washington, New York) was an American opera director, conductor, and pianist of Hungarian birth. He studied with Béla Bartók, Zoltan Kodály, Ernö Dohnányi and Leó Weiner at the Budapest Music Academy.

== Biography ==
In 1943 he was appointed the first director of the New York City Opera, a position he held through 1951. He later served on music faculties of the Peabody Conservatory of Music and the Eastman School of Music as part of their conducting and opera departments. He was married to the cellist Suzette Forgues Halasz for more than 50 years.

In 1949, Halasz was a passenger onboard Pan Am Flight 100, which suffered a mid-air collision over Port Washington.

== Sources ==
- Opera News Obituary
- New York Times Obituary
