= New York City Opera =

Opera company based in New York City

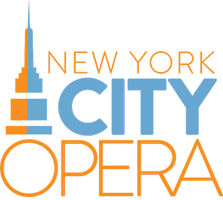

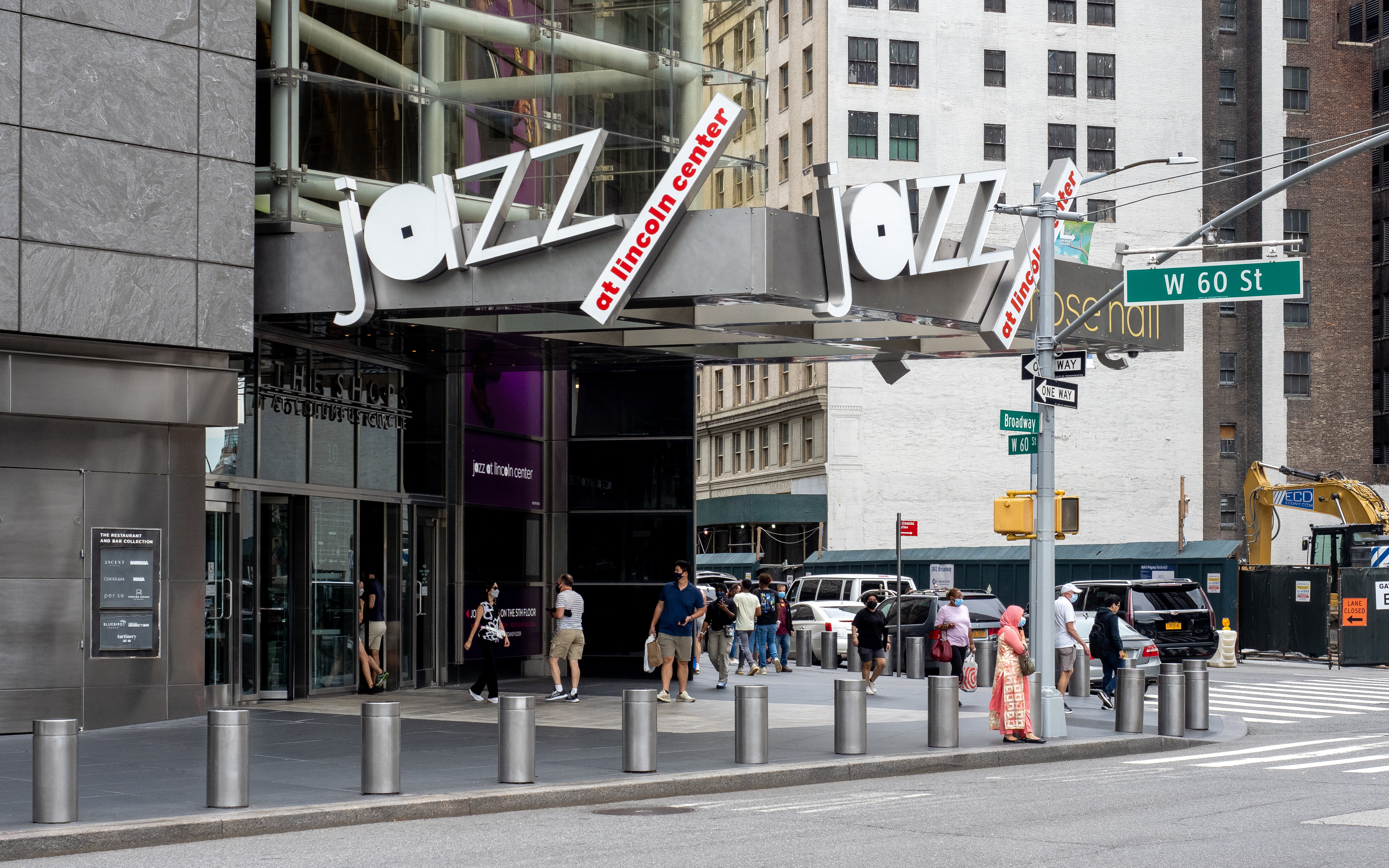
- Jazz at Lincoln Center, home of New York City Opera 2016–present
- Formation: 1943
- Type: Opera company
- Location: New York City, New York
- Website: www.nycopera.com

The New York City Opera (NYCO) is an American opera company located in Manhattan in New York City. The company has been active from 1943 through its 2013 bankruptcy, and again since 2016 when it was revived.

The opera company, dubbed "the people's opera" by New York mayor Fiorello La Guardia, was founded in 1943. The company's stated purpose was to make opera accessible to a wide audience at a reasonable ticket price. It also sought to produce an innovative choice of repertory, and provide a home for American singers and composers. The company was originally housed at the New York City Center theater on West 55th Street in Manhattan. It later became part of the Lincoln Center for the Performing Arts at the New York State Theater from 1966 to 2010. During this time it produced autumn and spring seasons of opera in repertory, and maintained extensive education and outreach programs, offering arts-in-education programs to 4,000 students in over 30 schools. In 2011, the company left Lincoln Center due to financial pressures and moved its offices to 75 Broad Street in Lower Manhattan. In the 2011−12 and 2012−13 seasons, NYCO performed four operas at different venues in New York City, including the Brooklyn Academy of Music. On October 1, 2013, following an unsuccessful emergency fund-raising campaign, the company filed for Chapter 11 bankruptcy.

In January 2016, a nonprofit group, NYCO Renaissance, revived the opera company under new management when its reorganization plans for the company to leave bankruptcy and re-launch performances were approved in bankruptcy court. The group, led by Roy Niederhoffer, a hedge fund manager and former board member of the NYCO, announced plans to present a season of opera in 2016−17. The first opera was Puccini's Tosca, presented at the Rose Theater at Jazz at Lincoln Center in January 2016.

During its 70-year-plus history, the NYCO has helped launch the careers of many great opera singers including Beverly Sills, Sherrill Milnes, Plácido Domingo, Maralin Niska, Carol Vaness, José Carreras, Shirley Verrett, Tatiana Troyanos, Jerry Hadley, Catherine Malfitano, Samuel Ramey, and Gianna Rolandi. Sills later served as the company's director from 1979 until 1989. More recent acclaimed American singers who have called NYCO home include David Daniels, Mark Delavan, Mary Dunleavy, Lauren Flanigan, Elizabeth Futral, Bejun Mehta, Robert Brubaker and Carl Tanner. NYCO has similarly championed the work of American composers; approximately one-third of its repertoire has traditionally been American opera. The company's American repertoire has ranged from established works (e.g., Douglas Moore's The Ballad of Baby Doe, Carlisle Floyd's Susannah, and Leonard Bernstein's Candide) to new works (e.g., Thomas Pasatieri's Before Breakfast and Mark Adamo's Little Women). NYCO's commitment to the future of American opera was demonstrated in its annual series, Vox, Contemporary Opera Lab, in which operas-in-progress were showcased, giving composers a chance to hear their work performed by professional singers and orchestra. The company has also occasionally produced musicals and operettas, including works by Stephen Sondheim and Gilbert and Sullivan.

== Early years: 1943–51 ==
The NYCO was founded as the New York City Center Opera, and originally made its home at the New York City Center on West 55th Street, in Manhattan. City Center's chair of the finance committee, Morton Baum, Mayor Fiorello La Guardia and council president Newbold Morris hired Laszlo Halasz hired the company's first director, serving in that position from 1943 until 1951. Given the company's goal of making opera accessible to the masses, Halasz believed that tickets should be inexpensive and that productions should be staged convincingly with singers who were both physically and vocally suited to their roles. To this end, ticket prices during the company's first season were priced at just 75 cents to $2 ($37 in current dollar terms), and the company operated on a budget of $30,463 ($5,600,000 in current dollar terms) during its first season. At such prices the company was unable to afford the star billing enjoyed by the Metropolitan Opera. Halasz, however, was able to turn this fact into a virtue by making the company an important platform for young singers, particularly American opera singers.

The company's first season opened on February 21, 1944, with Giacomo Puccini's Tosca, and included productions of Friedrich von Flotow's Martha and Georges Bizet's Carmen, all of them conducted by Halasz. Several notable singers performed with the company in the first season, including Dusolina Giannini, Jennie Tourel and Martha Lipton, who was immediately poached by the Met after their NYCO debuts. Other notable singers Halasz brought to the NYCO included Frances Bible, Adelaide Bishop, Débria Brown, Mack Harrell, Thomas Hayward, Dorothy Kirsten, Brenda Lewis, Eva Likova, Leon Lishner, Regina Resnik, Norman Scott, Ramón Vinay, and Frances Yeend.

Under Halasz's leadership, the NYCO became the first major opera company to have an African American performer in 1945. This was in the production of Leoncavallo's Pagliacci, with Todd Duncan's performance as Tonio. Lawrence Winters and Robert McFerrin were other notable African American opera pioneers to sing with the company during this period. The first African American woman to sing with the NYCO was soprano Camilla Williams, as the title heroine in Madama Butterfly in 1946; a performance which marked the first time a black woman sang a role with a major American opera company. The NYCO was also the first American opera company to hire a black conductor. Everett Lee broke the color barrier for opera conductors in America when the NYCO hired him to conduct performances of La traviata in April 1955.

Halasz had a tumultuous relationship with the company's board of directors, given his strong opinions about what the NYCO should be. For one, he supported the idea of performing foreign language works in English to make opera more accessible to American audiences. He insisted on offering at least one production in English every season. The issue that created, the most tension between Halasz and the board was Halasz's commitment to staging new works by American composers and rarely heard operas at the opera house. The first New York City premiere presented by the company was Richard Strauss's Ariadne auf Naxos on October 10, 1946, with Ella Flesch in the title role, Virginia MacWatters as Zerbinetta, and James Pease as the music master. The production was described by the contemporary press as "record breaking", and it put the company "on the map". The NYCO subsequently toured Ariadne to His Majesty's Theatre, Montreal, giving the opera's Canadian premiere.

The first world premiere at the house was William Grant Still's Troubled Island in 1949. It was notably the first grand opera composed by an African-American to be produced in a major opera house. In the fall of 1949, the NYCO revived Prokofiev's comic opera The Love for Three Oranges, which had not been seen in America since its unsuccessful Chicago premiere in 1921. The new production, directed by Vladimir Rosing, turned into a smash hit and was brought back for two additional seasons.

Also in 1949, Halasz scheduled the world premiere of David Tamkin's The Dybbuk to be performed by the NYCO in 1950. However, the NYCO board opposed the decision and ultimately the production was postponed for financial reasons. Halasz, however, rescheduled the work for inclusion in the 1951/52 season. Uneasy with Halasz's bold repertoire choices, the NYCO board insisted in 1951 that Halasz submit his repertory plans for their approval. As a result, he resigned, along with several members of his conducting staff, including Jean Morel, and two of his eventual successors, Joseph Rosenstock and Julius Rudel. Faced with the resignations of most of their creative staff, the board reluctantly backed down and The Dybbuk was given its world premiere at the NYCO on October 4, 1951. But tensions remained high between Halasz and the board, and they fired him in late 1951 when Halasz became involved in union disputes.

== Rosenstock and Leinsdorf: 1952–57 ==
After Halász was fired, the NYCO board appointed Joseph Rosenstock, who was already working as a conductor with the company, as the new director. He served in that post for four seasons, during which time he continued in Halász's steps of scheduling innovative programs with unusual repertoire mixed in with standard works. He notably staged the world premiere of Aaron Copland's The Tender Land, the New York premiere of William Walton's Troilus and Cressida, and the United States premieres of Gottfried von Einem's The Trial and Béla Bartók's Bluebeard's Castle. Rosenstock was also the first NYCO director to include musical theatre in the company's repertoire, with a 1954 production of Jerome Kern and Oscar Hammerstein II's Show Boat; a production which starred Broadway musical veteran and operatic soprano Helena Bliss. This decision was ridiculed by the press, but Rosenstock felt justified as the musical played to a packed house. Meanwhile, the company's staging of Donizetti's opera Don Pasquale that season only sold 35 percent of the house seats.

In January 1956 the NYCO board accepted Rosenstock's resignation. He stated that he left because he was faced with too much non-musical work such as bookings and business negotiations. The board appointed Erich Leinsdorf, who had worked as a conductor at the Metropolitan Opera, the Cleveland Orchestra, and the Rochester Philharmonic, to take his place. Leinsdorf stayed with the company for only one season. He was fired after his ambitious program of contemporary and unusual works for the 1956 season failed to soothe financial problems at the NYCO, and drew harsh criticism from the press. The press particularly did not care for his new productions of Jacques Offenbach's Orpheus in the Underworld and the American premiere of Carl Orff's Der Mond. However, Leinsdorf did have one major triumph with the first professional production of Carlisle Floyd's Susannah with Phyllis Curtin in the title role, and Norman Treigle as the Reverend Blitch. The production was a critical success with both audiences and critics, and the opera went on to become an American classic.

== Rudel: 1957–79 ==
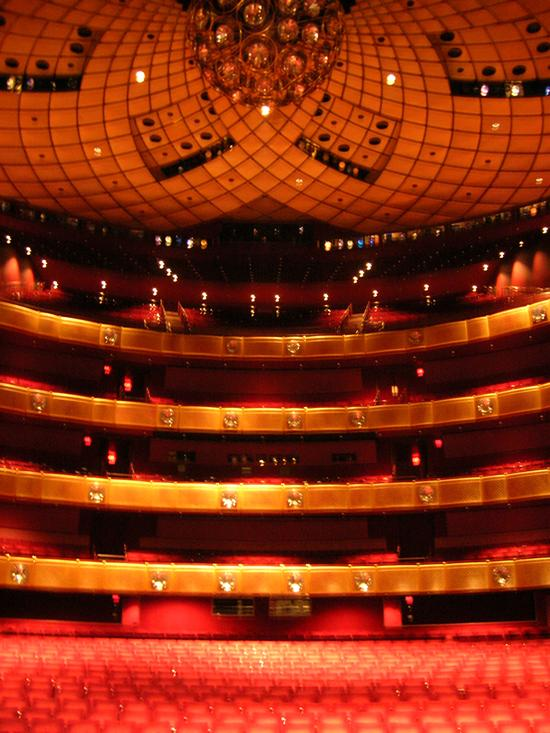
The New York State Theater auditorium as seen from the stage (now the David H. Koch Theater)

After Leinsdorf was fired, the NYCO board canceled its 1957 spring season and eventually appointed Julius Rudel as the new general director of the company. Rudel had been hired by the NYCO straight out of college in 1944, and had worked on the conducting staff there for 13 years. Under Rudel's leadership, the company reached new artistic heights, drawing critical praise for its performances of both standard and adventurous works. The company became known for its cutting-edge stage direction, largely due to Rudel's willingness to poach renowned directors from the theatre who had not necessarily been involved with opera before. By the mid-1960s the company was generally regarded as one of the leading opera companies in the United States.

During his tenure at City Opera, Rudel displayed a strong commitment to American opera, commissioning 12 works and leading 19 world premieres. He also led a large number of United States premieres, including Alberto Ginastera's Don Rodrigo with tenor Plácido Domingo for the inauguration of the NYCO's new home at the New York State Theater at Lincoln Center (now called the David H. Koch Theater) on February 22, 1966. That same season the company presented the New York premiere of Poulenc's Dialogues of the Carmelites.

Like his predecessors, Rudel had an eye for young American talent and was responsible for helping to cultivate a couple of generations of American singers. Among the singers whose careers he furthered were bass-baritone Samuel Ramey and lirico-spinto soprano Carol Vaness. One of his most apt decisions was in forming an artistic partnership with Beverly Sills, making her the NYCO's leading soprano from 1956 until her retirement from the stage in 1979, although Joseph Rosenstock deserves the credit for hiring her in 1955 for her first performances with the company. With the NYCO Sills had her first major critical success in the first Handel opera staged by the company, the role of Cleopatra in Giulio Cesare opposite Norman Treigle in 1966. At that time Handel operas were rarely produced and the production drew a lot of attention from the international press. Sills was soon making appearances with all the major opera houses around the world. While Sills was busy with her international career, she remained a regular performer with the NYCO until her retirement. In 1970 John Simon White was appointed managing director of the NYCO, in order to free up Rudel's schedule for the more artistic side of his job. White remained in that position until 1980.

== Sills: 1979–88 ==
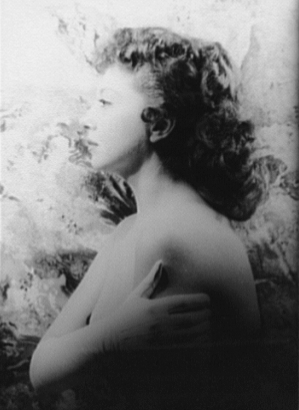
Beverly Sills in 1956, photo by Carl Van Vechten

Upon Sills's retirement from the stage in 1979, she succeeded Rudel as general director of the NYCO. Initially the plan was for Sills to share the post with Rudel, and slowly phase him out. However, Rudel decided to resign in 1979 in order to take a position as music director of the Buffalo Philharmonic, and Sills took the post over entirely.

At the time Sills assumed her position, the NYCO was in financial difficulties, burdened with a three million dollar debt after a few seasons with less than favorable reviews. On the business side, Sills proved to be a godsend to the company, showing a prodigious gift for fund-raising. By the time she retired from her post in early 1989, she had grown the company's budget from $9 million ($40,000,000 in current dollar terms) to $26 million ($68,000,000 in current dollar terms), and left the company in the black with a $3 million ($8,000,000 in current dollar terms) surplus. She was able to achieve this while still reducing ticket prices by 20 percent, with the hope of attracting new and younger audiences.

== Keene: 1989–95 ==
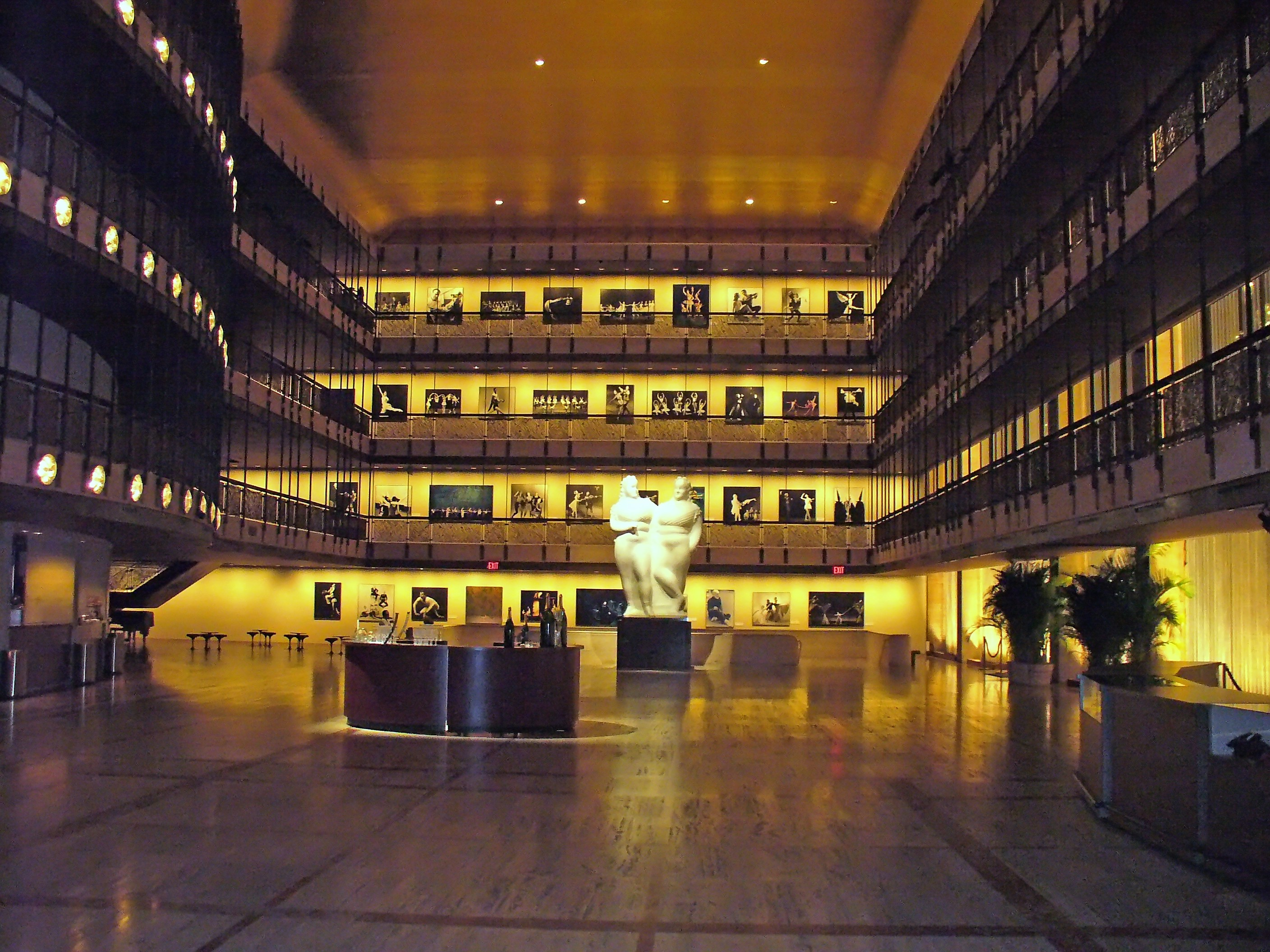
Promenade of the David H. Koch Theater

Sills retired as general director in 1989, and was replaced by conductor Christopher Keene—largely on the basis of Sills' strong recommendation. Keene had previously worked as a conductor at the NYCO since 1970, and had served as the NYCO's Music Director from 1982 to 1986. Keene consistently presented innovative opera seasons that were successful with critics during his tenure. His last season with the company included the United States premieres of Toshiro Mayuzumi's Kinkakuji [The Golden Pavilion] and Jost Meier's Dreyfus Affair. A month before his death Peter G. Davis wrote in New York that "Keene is one of the few authentic cultural heroes New York has left, thanks to his many recent acts of courage, personal as well as artistic."

Keene held the position until his death from lymphoma arising from AIDS at the age of 48. His last performance, at the City Opera, was of Hindemith's Mathis der Maler in September 1995.

== Kellogg: 1996–2007 ==
Keene was succeeded in 1996 by Glimmerglass Opera's general and artistic director, Paul Kellogg. Under his leadership, the NYCO added 62 new productions to its repertoire, including several world premieres by American composers, and inaugurated the series: Vox: Showcasing American Composers. Kellogg was also instrumental in establishing the NYCO as an important producer of operas by baroque masters such as Handel, Gluck, and Rameau, sparking a renewal of interest in these long-neglected works. A particular triumph was a highly lauded production of Handel's Orlando in 2007 in a modern production by Chas Rader-Shieber that starred countertenor Bejun Mehta and the soprano Amy Burton. In keeping with NYCO's "people's opera" tradition, Kellogg inaugurated NYCO's "Opera for All" event, with reduced priced tickets, in 2005.

Kellogg announced his retirement in 2007. Anthony Tommasini, in The New York Times, commented that Kellogg had "a record of innovation and achievement to be proud of. Few leaders of performing-arts institutions have been as effective at defining and carrying out a company mission". Tommasini called Kellogg's decision, at the urging of New York City mayor Rudy Giuliani, to open its season on September 15, 2001, directly after the 9/11 attacks, "the most meaningful day of music in 2001," and later used NYCO's opening day in 2001 and its 2009/10 season as symbolic bookends for New York's music scene in the first decade of the 21st century.

=== Vox, Contemporary Opera Lab ===
Vox, Contemporary Opera Lab (also known as Vox: Showcasing American Composers) was an annual concert series dedicated to the development of contemporary American operas. Founded by New York City Opera in 1999, the festival offered composers and librettists the opportunity to hear excerpts of their works performed with professional singers and musicians. Up to twelve excerpts of previously un-produced operas were performed at each festival. Many of the operas that were presented at Vox went on to be presented in full production by New York City Opera and various other opera companies, including Richard Danielpour's Margaret Garner. From 2006, the Vox performances were presented at New York University's Skirball Center for the Performing Arts.

== Interregnum: 2008–09 ==
A note of uncertainty about the company's future emerged in November 2008, when Gerard Mortier, who was scheduled to begin his first official season as general and artistic director of the company in 2009, abruptly resigned. The company announced that "The economic climate in which we find ourselves today has caused us both to reconsider proceeding with our plans." Mortier had reportedly been promised a $60 million annual budget, which was cut to $36 million due to the economic climate. Michael Kaiser was appointed to advise the board on a turnaround strategy, including the recruitment of a new general director.

The David H. Koch Theater (previously known as the New York State Theater) underwent major renovations during the 2008/09 season. During the construction the company did not stage opera in its home at Lincoln Center. Instead, New York City Opera presented a concert version of Samuel Barber's Antony and Cleopatra at Carnegie Hall in January 2009, as well as other concerts and programs around the city, and continued to make classroom presentations in New York City's public schools. The company presented three concerts at the Schomburg Center for Research in Black Culture in 2009: I'm On My Way: Black History at City Opera, One Fine Day: A Tribute to Camilla Williams, and a 60th anniversary concert production of William Grant Still's Troubled Island.

In June 2009 Bloomberg reported that the company had incurred a $11 million deficit for the year ending June 2008. Revenue fell 23 percent to $32.9 million, and expenses rose 11 percent to $44.2 million.

== Steel: 2009–13 ==
In January 2009, the company announced the appointment of George Steel as general manager and artistic director, effective February 1, 2009. The New York Times reported at the time that "many consider [the NYCO] the nation's second most important house."

In January 2009, when Steel was asked to take the helm of the opera to try to turn the company around, it had suffered a string of financial and managerial blows: a decade of multimillion-dollar deficits, a "dark" season in 2008/09 (i.e., a season without any staged opera performances), the depletion of Company's endowment to pay off a huge accumulated deficit, the market collapse of 2008, the radical reduction by the board of the budget and of the size of the season, and the sudden withdrawal of Gerard Mortier, who was to have become general manager after a lengthy period without leadership (Paul Kellogg, the previous general director had left in 2007).

Under Steel during the 2009–2010 season, the company returned with an opening night program called American Voices consisting of excerpts from American opera. The season also included a revival of Hugo Weisgall's Esther, and a new production of Mozart's Don Giovanni directed by Christopher Alden. The spring season opened in March 2010 and included Emmanuel Chabrier's L'étoile directed by Mark Lamos, and Handel's Partenope directed by Andrew Chown; original production directed by Francisco Negrin. The company also continued to collaborate with the Schomburg Center for Research in Black Culture and Opera Noire of New York to highlight the role of opera in African-American history, including the programs Opera at the Schomburg, A Tribute to Robert McFerrin, and X, The Life and Times of Malcolm X. In April 2010, NYCO's VOX Contemporary Opera Lab featured new works of emerging and established composers at New York University.

The company's 2010–2011 season included a new production of Leonard Bernstein's A Quiet Place directed by Christopher Alden; Richard Strauss's Intermezzo directed by Leon Major; and a new production titled Monodramas which consisted of three solo one-act works: John Zorn's La Machine de l'être, Arnold Schoenberg's Erwartung, and Morton Feldman's Neither. The company also staged the American premiere of Séance on a Wet Afternoon, the first opera by Stephen Schwartz, the veteran composer of Broadway musicals.

In addition, the company presented several concert performances that included: An Evening With Christine Brewer; Lucky To Be Me: The Music of Leonard Bernstein; John Zorn & Friends (with Laurie Anderson, Lou Reed, Mike Patton, Marc Ribot, Dave Douglas, and Uri Caine); a family opera concert of Oliver Knussen's Where the Wild Things Are with a libretto by Maurice Sendak; and Defying Gravity: The Music of Stephen Schwartz with Kristin Chenoweth and Raúl Esparza. In May 2011, the company announced that it would leave Lincoln Center to conserve costs, and present its upcoming season in different venues throughout the city.

On the business side, the opera underwent tremendous change under Steel's tenure, which both balanced the budget and extended the life of the company. These changes led directly to the opera's first balanced budgets in an over a decade and a sold-out 2011–2012 season. Some of the steps Steel took in his efforts to save the company aroused controversy, including a contentious, but ultimately successful, contract negotiation with the labor unions representing the orchestra and the singers, and the departure of the opera from Lincoln Center out of financial necessity. While the company had for more than a decade discussed publicly the idea of leaving Lincoln Center, the company's ultimate departure, driven by the financial reality that the opera would otherwise have to close, was met alternately with praise and scepticism. Notwithstanding artistic successes, record fundraising, and dramatic changes to the company's business model, the opera ultimately succumbed to bankruptcy.

== Bankruptcy: 2013–15 ==
On October 1, 2013, the company filed for Chapter 11 bankruptcy in the United States Bankruptcy Court for the Southern District of New York, citing an inability to raise sufficient funding to continue the 2013/14 season. The company's last production was the U.S. premiere of Mark-Anthony Turnage's Anna Nicole. The case was before Judge Sean Lane.

In an article in the New York Times, music critic Anthony Tommasini noted one of the reasons for the company's 2013 bankruptcy (as well as relating it to other failed arts organizations):

In short, artistic excellence is not enough. Any institution, big or small, old or new, must have a clear artistic vision, a purpose that connects with audiences and the community. But the performing arts have never been profit-making endeavors. It is more important than ever that all institutions, from a fledgling string quartet to the lofty Metropolitan Opera, have an effective business model.

== Revival: since 2016 ==
A not-for-profit company named NYCO Renaissance Ltd. proposed a Chapter 11 plan for the reorganization of New York City Opera in 2015, and the reorganization of the existing company took place in 2016. An additional incentive was made to those who had purchased tickets and not received a refund.

The group announced plans to relaunch New York City Opera in January 2016, with a mix of opera staples and niche works. The proposed new home for a revived NYCO is the modern 1,100-seat Rose Theater at Jazz at Lincoln Center. Both the City Opera board and – unanimously – the creditors' committee (those owed money in the bankruptcy) preferred the bid of NYCO Renaissance, which was backed financially and chaired by Roy Niederhoffer, a hedge fund manager and accomplished amateur musician who had earlier served on the New York City Opera board, and who pledged more than $1 million of his own money to the effort, and raised at least $2.5 million.

The bankruptcy court approved the reorganization plan of New York City Opera Renaissance, allowing it to leave bankruptcy and re-launch performances, in January 2016. Bankruptcy Judge Sean Lane said he was pleased to approve the plan of "a beloved and important cultural institution," and that "It's been the participation of people who care greatly about the opera that's led to what I think is a very good result here today." Under the reorganization plan, the opera will put on annual seasons, and its general director will be Michael Capasso. Gail Kruvand, the chairwoman of the City Opera orchestra committee, said: "We're thrilled ... and we're looking forward to a long future with New York City Opera."

NYCO Renaissance presented Puccini's Tosca – using Adolfo Hohenstein's stage and costume design from the opera's premiere in 1900 in Rome – in January 2016 at the 1,100-seat Rose Theater. It had two separate casts, including tenor James Valenti and soprano Latonia Moore, and the least expensive balcony seats were $25. Tosca had been, in 1944, the first opera performed by the NYCO.

The NYCO announced that it would round out the 2015–16 season with the performance of three contemporary works, all new to the company. On March 16, 2016, a new concert series at the Appel Room in Jazz at Lincoln Center was inaugurated with the premiere of David Hertzberg's "Sunday Morning". A work for soprano and small ensemble, it featured soprano Sarah Shafer and mezzo-soprano Kirstin Chávez. That was followed by the East Coast premiere of composer Stewart Wallace's and librettist Michael Korie's Hopper's Wife – a surreal, erotically charged 90-minute 1997 chamber opera fantasy about an imagined marriage between the painter Edward Hopper and the gossip columnist Hedda Hopper. It was directed by Andreas Mitisek at Harlem Stage from April 28 through May 1, 2016, in his New York City directorial debut. Third, the NYCO staged Daniel Catán's Florencia en el Amazonas June 22–26, 2016 at Jazz at Lincoln Center's Rose Theater. Based on the writing of Gabriel García Márquez, the opera was part of a new Spanish-language opera series named Ópera en Español. Reviewing the performance, James Jorden of The New York Observer wrote: "[in] the current offering of the resurrected New York City Opera ... every page of the score sails orgasmically over the top, as sinfully rich as molten caramel sauce ... The reconstituted New York City Opera should be bursting with pride at the high level of quality extending across every aspect of this presentation ... Among as strong a cast of vocalists as I've heard at NYCO in 20 years or more, the standout appropriately was Elizabeth Caballero as Florencia. ... this production makes it clear that the company is at the very top of its game." The Wall Street Journal opined that "Ms. Caballero is a find." New York Classical Review, while noting some staging flaws, wrote: "If this is to be the standard of the company's work going forward, the future may be very bright indeed."

The NYCO's Opening Night for the 2016–17 season, on September 8, 2016, was a new production double bill of two operas that both premiered in May 1892, Aleko (a New York premier; composed by Sergei Rachmaninoff, an adaptation of Alexander Pushkin's poem The Gypsies) and Pagliacci (by Ruggero Leoncavallo). They were directed by Lev Pugliese, with conductor James Meena leading the NYCO Orchestra, at Rose Theater at Jazz at Lincoln Center's Rose Hall. Bass Stefan Szkafarowsky made his NYCO debut in the title role of Aleko, and Pagliacci featured tenor Francesco Anile in his NYCO debut as Canio. Anthony Tommasini of The New York Times wrote that "the performance offered animated, if sometimes scrappy, playing by the New York City Opera Orchestra ... and vibrant singing from the company's chorus. ... "Pagliacci" offers strong, if not exceptional, vocal performances in the leading roles. The tenor Francesco Anile brings a sizable, somewhat nasal voice to Canio, the betrayed husband. As Nedda, his straying wife, the soprano Jessica Rose Cambio sings with agile coloratura and mostly shimmering sound. ... An enthusiastic audience showed up for the opening event in what should be a revealing, even defining, season for the rebooted City Opera." New York Classical Review wrote: "On this occasion, Pagliacci emerged considerably more moving than the recent Met production by David McVicar, mostly due to the Rose's increased intimacy. It also didn't hurt that, for the role of Canio, the company snagged Francesco Anile ... [who] has the voice: a clear, expressive instrument that pleasantly "pings" above the orchestra, and equally, what appears to be a fountain of acting chops. In the famous scene in which Canio realizes that Nedda has been unfaithful, the soft sobbing into his costume was undeniably affecting. And when he leaped onstage to open the traveling show, his drunkenness was believable, not overdone. ... After a rocky few years, this musically and emotionally satisfying double bill is the best evidence yet that this storied company may at last be staggering to its feet." The Huffington Post opined: "NYCO is on the right track to re-establishing itself as a force in the opera world."

In January 2022, NYCO produced the world premiere of Michael Korie and Ricky Ian Gordon's The Garden of the Finzi-Continis in co-production with the National Yiddish Theatre Folksbiene.

== World premieres ==
- William Grant Still – Troubled Island (1949)
- David Tamkin – The Dybbuk (1951)
- Aaron Copland – The Tender Land (1954)
- Mark Bucci – Tale for a Deaf Ear (1958, first professional production)
- Robert Kurka – The Good Soldier Schweik (1958)
- Hugo Weisgall – Six Characters in Search of an Author (1959)
- Norman Dello Joio – The Triumph of St. Joan (1959, the premiere of the third version)
- Robert Ward – He Who Gets Slapped (1959, revised version)
- Douglas Moore – The Wings of the Dove (1961)
- Robert Ward – The Crucible (1961)
- Abraham Ellstein – The Golem (1962)
- Carlisle Floyd – The Passion of Jonathan Wade (1962)
- Jerome Moross – Gentlemen, Be Seated! (1963)
- Lee Hoiby – Natalia Petrovna (1964)
- Jack Beeson – Lizzie Borden (1965)
- Ned Rorem – Miss Julie (1965)
- Vittorio Giannini – Servant of Two Masters (1967)
- Hugo Weisgall – Nine Rivers from Jordan (1968)
- Gian Carlo Menotti – The Most Important Man (1971)
- Thea Musgrave – The Voice of Ariadne (1977)
- Leon Kirchner – Lily (1977)
- Dominick Argento – Miss Havisham's Fire (1979)
- Stanley Silverman – Madame Adare (1980)
- Thomas Pasatieri – Before Breakfast (1980)
- Jan Bach – The Student from Salamanca (1980)
- Leonard Bernstein – Candide (Opera House Version) (1982)
- Anthony Davis – X, The Life and Times of Malcolm X (1986, first staged production)
- Jay Reise – Rasputin (1988)
- Hugo Weisgall – Esther (1993)
- Ezra Laderman – Marilyn (1993)
- Lukas Foss – Griffelkin (1993, premiere of revised version)
- Deborah Drattell – Lilith (2001, first staged production)
- Charles Wuorinen – Haroun and the Sea of Stories (2004)
- Ricky Ian Gordon – The Garden of the Finzi-Continis (2022)
