= David Tamkin =

American composer (1906–1975)

David Tamkin (28 August 1906 – 21 June 1975) was an American composer of Jewish descent, born in Chernihiv, Russian Empire. He devoted much of his professional career as an arranger, composer [uncredited] and orchestrator of film scores for Hollywood movies. He worked on more than 50 films between 1939 and 1970. His opera The Dybbuk premiered at New York City Opera in October, 1951.
