= Not Without a Friend =

Studio album by Peter Skellern
- Released: 25 January 1974
- Recorded: September – 11 October 1973
- Studios: CTS The Music Centre, Wembley
- Genre: Pop
- Length: 39:07
- Label: Decca
- Producer: Derek Taylor

Peter Skellern chronology
You're a Lady (1972)	Not Without a Friend (1974)	Holding My Own (1974)

Singles from Not Without a Friend
- 1. "Still Magic" Released: 1973

Not Without a Friend is the second album by English singer-songwriter Peter Skellern, released on 25 January 1974 by Decca Records. Arriving just over a year after Skellern's first album You're a Lady and the single success of its title track, the album was produced by Derek Taylor, former press officer for the Beatles then working for WEA (Warner-Elektra-Atlantic). Despite positive reviews, Not Without a Friend and its single "Still Magic" failed to chart. It was reissued in 2019 by Mint Audio as part of Peter Skellern: The Complete Decca Recordings, a release crowdfunded by fans through a Kickstarter campaign.

== Background ==
After signing to Decca Records in May 1972, Peter Skellern released his debut single "You're a Lady" in August. A love song featuring a brass band, it was Skellern's first and greatest chart success, peaking at number 3 on the UK Singles Chart. and selling over 800,000 copies. It also charted at number 50 on the United States Billboard Hot 100. However, Skellern's debut album of the same name was a commercial disappointment. It failed to chart and, by April 1973, had sold only 6,000 copies. Singles "Our Jackie's Getting Married" and "Roll Away" also failed to chart. Skellern was reluctant to perform live at this time, feeling he was not ready. He made his first live appearance on 29 May 1973, performing at a concert at the London Palladium for the charity KIDS. Further concerts in 1973 included an appearance at the Institute of Contemporary Arts in November.

Skellern sought a fresh approach for his second album. You're a Lady producer Peter Sames was replaced by Derek Taylor, former press officer for the Beatles and publicist for notable American acts such as the Beach Boys and the Byrds. Skellern had enjoyed Nilsson's A Little Touch of Schmilsson in the Night, produced by Taylor. Taylor's style was ill-suited to Skellern's sensibilities; he filled the studio with palm trees in an attempt to give it a palm court atmosphere, brought alcohol into the studio and sent limousines to pick up musicians. Such excesses put the project overbudget and Skellern was ultimately unhappy with the album and his vocals. The 1975 compilation Hold On To Love features a remixed version of "And So It Passes" with new vocals.

== Contents ==
"Still Magic", described by the Daily Mirror as a "heart-warming song to a long-term love with a religious feel to the music and a breathless catch to the words", was issued as a single to promote the album in autumn 1973; reviewing the single in Record Mirror, Pete Jones wrote that the song's mood paralleled "You're a Lady" with "the smokey and slightly-wavering voice, the intensity which never gets out of hand, the semi-religioso touches and the piano". Jones considered it to be "a sensitive performance and song" and "quality pop music". "Still Magic" failed to chart but became one of Skellern's signature songs; he rerecorded it for his 1980 album of the same name, released by Mercury Records. It was also a feature of his double act with Richard Stilgoe, with a rendition of the song featuring on their 2000 album A Quiet Night Out. "Hymn Song", the album's final track, is a meditation on mortality that reflects Skellern's Christian faith. A section of the popular hymn The Day Thou Gavest, Lord, is Ended is woven into the song's melody. Alexander Armstrong covered the song on his 2016 album Upon a Different Shore, and performed it on the 23 October edition of the BBC Television religious programme Songs of Praise.

Skellern recorded twelve songs for the album, the longest of which, "Revolution", was ultimately left off the album due to timing constraints. This track was issued on Mint Audio's 2019 release Peter Skellern: The Complete Decca Recordings, having been rediscovered during the remastering process.

== Release ==
Not Without a Friend was initially scheduled for release on 18 January 1974, but it was delayed due to the Three-Day Week. It saw release the following week, on 25 January 1974. Like Skellern's first album You're a Lady, it failed to chart. It was issued on CD in 1990 but availability was brief. In 2019, Mint Audio issued a remastered version of the album as part of Peter Skellern: The Complete Decca Recordings. This release was produced by sound engineer Richard Moore and crowdfunded by fans through a Kickstarter campaign. Skellern collaborators Richard Stilgoe and Tim Rice are listed among the executive producers.

== Reception ==
Upon release, Not Without a Friend received a positive review from Record Mirror, who described Skellern as "full of surprises, painting his musical magic on some pretty broad canvasses". They added "the voice may not be of operatic quality, or of spot-on accuracy, but it suits perfectly the romantic mood of most of the songs".

Amongst retrospective reviews, David Quantick of Record Collector considered the album "a consolidation of Skellern’s sound with a newfound cockiness", and praised "Hymn Song" as "passionate and beautiful" and "one of the best songs of Peter Skellern’s – or anyone’s – career". Joe Marchese of The Second Disc praised the album, singling out "the dramatic "Still Magic", a solo "Piano Rag" showing off Skellern’s chops at the keys and the rock-oriented "Misguided Youth"" as standouts.

== Track listing ==
All songs written and composed by Peter Skellern, except where noted.

=== Side one ===
1. "Send My Heart to San Francisco" – 3:59
2. "Big Time Indian Chief" – 3:09
3. "Still Magic" – 4:26
4. "Rocking Chair" (Hoagy Carmichael) – 4:15
5. "Piano Rag" – 3:06

=== Side two ===
6. "Misguided Youth" – 3:01
7. "And So It Passes" – 3:06
8. "Winter Song" – 3:13
9. "No More Sunday Papers" – 3:09
10. "Song to the Critics" – 4:01
11. "Hymn Song" – 3:42

=== Bonus tracks on the 2019 remaster ===
12. "Somebody Call Me Tonight" – 2:21
13. "Sleepy Guitar" – 3:31
14. "Make It Easy For Me" – 3:23
15. "Roll Away" – 3:31
16. "Revolution" – 4:31

== Personnel ==
Adapted from the liner notes of Not Without a Friend

- Peter Skellern – writer
- Hoagy Carmichael – writer
- Derek Taylor – producer
