= Holding My Own (Peter Skellern album) =

Studio album by Peter Skellern
- Released: 1974
- Recorded: 25 March–3 April 1974
- Studios: Decca Studios, London
- Genres: Music hall; comedy
- Length: 37:06
- Label: Decca
- Producer: Johnny Stirling

Peter Skellern chronology
Not Without a Friend (1973)	Holding My Own (1974)	Hold On to Love (1975)

Holding My Own is the third studio album by English singer-songwriter Peter Skellern, released by Decca Records in September 1974. Recorded over several sessions with producer Johnny Stirling, the album marks a departure from the reflective pop of Skellern's prior work, instead exploring a comedic music hall style. The performer was inspired by a saucy seaside postcard and wanted to make an album of 'end of the pier' songs. He is largely accompanied on the album by romping piano and a quiet, shuffling snare drum. Eight of the songs are Skellern compositions, but others are music hall classics and standards, including "Abdul Abulbul Amir" and "She Had to Go and Lose It at the Astor".

To match the album's aesthetic, the cover art is in the style of the smutty postcards of designer Donald McGill. No singles were released from the album and it did not chart, although Skellern followed its release with a non-album single, "Hold On to Love", which was added as a bonus track when Holding My Own was remastered and reissued as part of the 2019 collection The Complete Decca Recordings. Music critics commented on the album's playful style and rude content.

== Background and recording ==
Holding My Own is one of three studio LPs that Skellern recorded for Decca Records, and was inspired by his love of humorous, end of the pier songs. According to the music writer Richard Moore, the bosses at Decca were likely resistant to the idea, instead preferring that Skellern record another pop album with potential hit material. The veteran producer Hugh Mendl, known for producing commercially successful comedy records in the 1950s and 1960s, was instrumental in persuading Decca to allow Skellern to record the album and "that it wasn't all about hits", as Moore describes. A hidden quote on the back cover reads: "God Bless Hugh Mendl for making this album possible."

The record recorded with Derek Taylor, then a senior official at Warner Bros. Records who at the time published Skellern's songs. The producer was Johnny Stirling, who had worked with Skellern since the latter was in the band the March Hare. Arthur Bannister and Pat Collister were hired as engineers. The basic tracks were captured with 8-track tape over two sessions at Decca Studios, beginning on 25 March 1974. However, production switched to 16-track tape on 3 April because Skellern decided to record multiple voices as background vocals, which was soon to become a signature of his work. Two songs which were attempted but left unfinished were "Number Two" and "Wakes Week". To compensate for the album's lack of single material, Skellern returned to the studio in September to record the non-album single "Hold On to Love", which was released in 1975 and became a British hit.

== Composition ==
As the music critic David Quantick describes, Holding My Own sees Skellern "veer ecstatically into the world of music hall", with fellow reviewer Chris Harbison crediting the album with reviving music hall tradition. Meanwhile, Val Falloon of Music Week calls it "a collection of point numbers old and silly songs". It departs from the quiet, reflective style of Skellern's earlier work, instead being an album of relatively rude ditties. Eight of the songs are new, original compositions by Skellern, but others are standards and music hall classics; these include Noël Coward's "That Is the End of the News", Percy French's silly music hall standard "Abdul Abulbul Amir" and the classic 1930s naughty song "She Had to Go and Lose It at the Astor". In their reference book The Faber Companion to 20th Century Popular Music (2001), Phil Hardy and Dave Laing write that Holding My Own "paid homage to music-hall comedy".

The album was inspired by a saucy seaside postcard of a small boy stood naked at the beach front, with the caption 'Holding My Own'; as Skellern told an interviewer, "I want to bring the pier to the people." Skellern was also influenced by Harry Nilsson's A Little Touch of Schmilsson in the Night (1973); as he later told Falloon, Holding My Own was recorded "because Harry Nilsson did the Schmilsson album – I wanted to do something like that. So we had to come up with something else." Falloon noted a "rueful" tone to Skellern's comment. Skellern sings throughout in a soft Northern accent, and the songs are "mostly accompanied by romping piano and a quietly shuffling snare drum – nothing to distract from the songs."

Skellern opens the album with "Abdul Abulbul Amir" which, combined with the cover artwork, harks back to the music hall era. Along with "The Tattooed Lady", it is an obvious example of the album's rude bent. According to Harbison, Skellern's working class outlook is evident when he writes about "his betters" on the songs "Up for the Shoot" and "Society Ladies", these lyrical references to class distinctions displaying a "biting wit". Similarly, the darkly humorous "That Is the End of the News" catalogues disasters that Harbison believes "could only happen to a working class family." "She Had to Go and Lose It at the Astor" concerns a young woman going on her first night out and ignoring her mother's warnings about losing 'it'. Elsewhere, Skellern's version of "The Tattooed Lady" saga has been described as "colourful", whereas "The Streaker" is a ragtime piano instrumental and has no connection to the Ray Stevens hit of the same name..

== Release and packaging ==
Although the album was inspired by the rude postcard of the nude boy, Skellern was unwilling to streak for the back cover; instead, he agreed to be photographed buried up to his neck in sand with a seagull atop his head. Deborah Thomas commented on the unlikely photograph, saying "I've seen them in sequins and rouge, I've seen them in top hats and star-shaped glasses, but never before have I seen a pop star with a seagull on his head." The front cover uses a smutty postcard design in the style of Donald McGill, and has been described as an appropriate match for the songs. One critic comments that the "saucy cover" is "appropriate enough for a number of saucy songs", while Quantick comments that the cover completes the album, along with its cheeky title.

Holding My Own was released through Decca Records in 1974, and did not chart in Britain. To commemorate the album's release, Skellern signed 10,000 rude Holding My Own postcards and sent them to his friends in the pop scene. Skellern later announced he would perform some of the album's silly songs on his 1978 national tour. Along with Skellern's first two albums, You're a Lady (1972) and Not Without a Friend (1973), Holding My Own was remastered and reissued as part of the singer's 2019 compilation The Complete Decca Recordings. This version of the album adds the single "Hold On to Love", and its lounge music B-side "Too Much I'm in Love", as bonus tracks. Holding My Own was re-released as a digital download on 26 April 2024.

== Critical reception ==
Professional ratings
Review scores
Source	Rating
Encyclopedia of Popular Music	2/5 stars

Commenting on Skellern's change in direction and exploration of rude songs, Deborah Thomas in the Daily Record warned listeners that Holding My Own is not "the 45 minutes of quiet reflection that you might expect from a man who has studied classical piano." Among contemporary critical reviews, Peter Douglas in the Runcorn Guardian noted that Skellern included several standards among his new material and hailed it as "[a] very witty entertaining album." In another positive review, Lancashire Evening Telegraph critic Mike Newsome commented on the saucy songs and noted that, for good measure, Skellern also "throws in some sparkling piano playing."

Chris Harbison of the Belfast Telegraph opined that Skellern's recitative songs would have made him popular in the music hall era and praised him for reviving the tradition, believing the singer "gets the balance between innuendo and propriety just right" and further echoing the opinion that he is "the working girl's Jake Thackray." Praise was also singled out for the "genuinely poignant" closing song "The End of the Show" – which departs from the fun style that permeates the album and proves Skellern is "more than a clown" – for "[rounding] off a truly original album." Less favourably, Pete Butterfield of the Evening Post felt that Skellern "lacked the direction and music business acumen" that surrounds his musical peer Leo Sayer, criticising him for foregoing his "original and fresh sounds", such as the use of a brass band. Butterfield wrote of Holding My Own, "Instead of progression we have recession to silly music hall songs", and lamented that "Skellern has well and truly lost it".

In his retrospective review for Record Collector, Quantick praised Skellen for having "the talent and panache" to record a quality album of music hall songs, describing Holding My Own as "a labour of love, and a joy to listen to". Quantick also highlighted the Complete Decca Recordings version of the album for adding "Hold on To Love" and its B-side "Too Much I'm in Love" as a bonus tracks, describing the former as one of the musician's best singles and highlighting the latter for "perfectly [riding] a mid-70s lounge groove" and concluding that Skellern displayed "a canny ability to move between nostalgic crooning, Northern comedy, and a pop sensibility entirely in keeping with the times." In The Virgin Encyclopedia of Popular Music (1997), Colin Larkin rated the record two stars out of five.

== Track listing ==
All songs written by Peter Skellern, except where noted

Side one

1. "Abdul Abulbul Amir" (trad arr. Skellern) – 2:57
2. "Up for the Shoot" – 3:13
3. "The Streaker" – 2:51
4. "The Tattooed Lady" (Walter O'Keefe) – 5:14
5. "She Had to Go and Lose It at the Astor" (John Doe, Joe Doqaues) – 2:09
6. "Skin and Bone" – 2:04

Side two

1. "Honey Chil'" – 2:27
2. "Society Ladies – 2:16
3. "This Is the End of the News" (Noël Coward) – 3:38
4. "Vicarious Vestments" – 2:12
5. "Uncle Sam" – 4:31
6. "The End of the Show" – 2:38

== Personnel ==
Adapted from the liner notes of Holding My Own

- Johnny Stirling – producer
- Arthur Bannister – engineer
- Pat Collister – engineer
