= Adelaide Bishop =

American actress

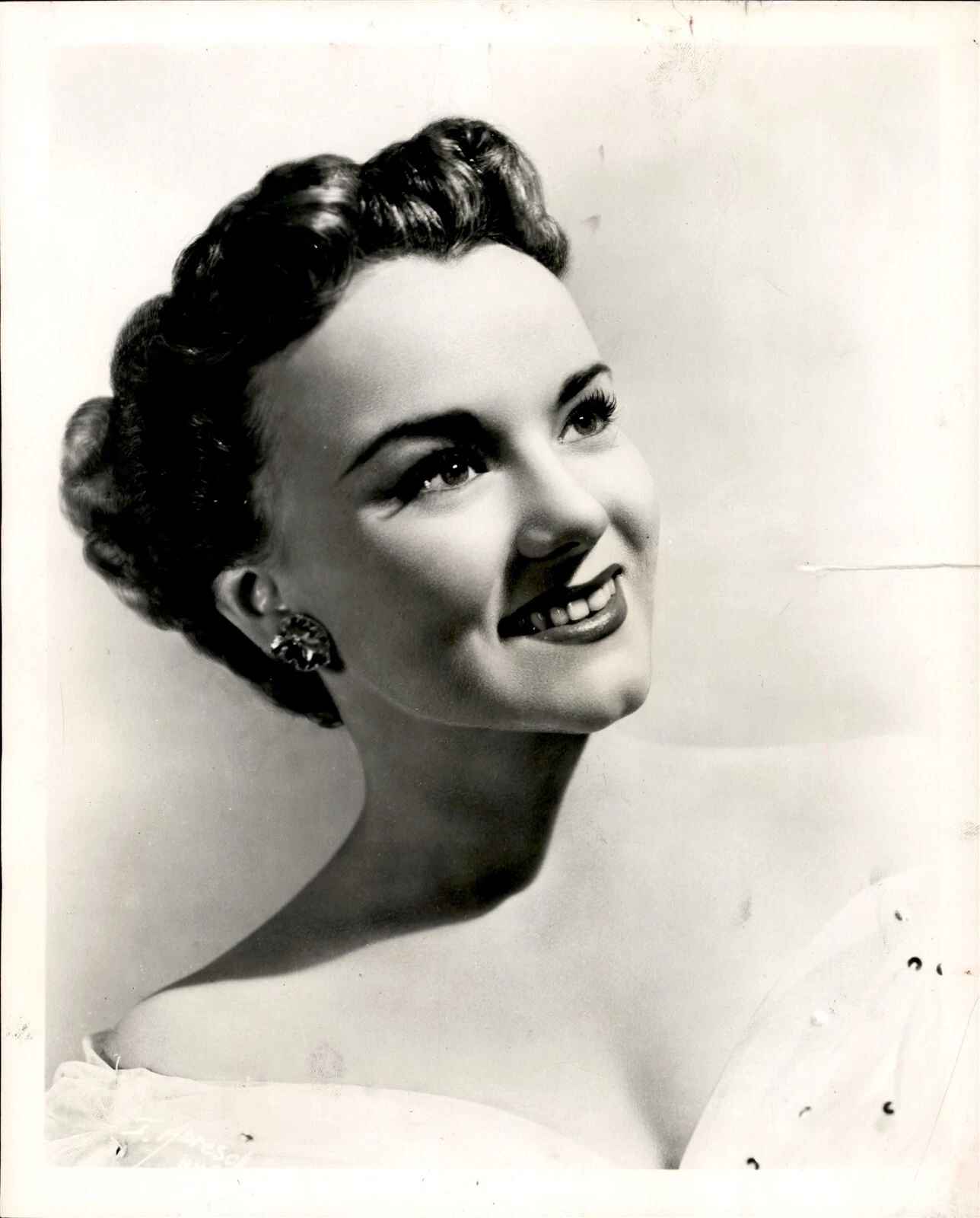
- Born: June 23, 1928; New York, United States
- Died: June 20, 2008 (aged 79); Sarasota, Florida
- Occupations: Singer, actress, stage director

Adelaide Bishop (23 June 1928 – 20 June 2008) was an American operatic soprano, musical theatre actress, opera director, stage director, and voice teacher. She began her career appearing in Broadway musicals as a teenager during the early 1940s. She became a principal soprano with the New York City Opera (NYCO) in 1948, where she performed through 1960 in a broad repertoire encompassing German, French, Italian, and English operas from a variety of musical periods. In the late 1950s, she started working actively as a stage director and as a voice teacher, working with many opera companies throughout the United States and serving on the music faculties of several different American universities. She also served as the artistic director of the Wolf Trap Opera for many years.

== Early life and career: 1928–1948 ==
Born in New York City, Bishop started studying singing as a young teenager with various instructors, including Paul Breisach, Louis Polanski, Rose Landver, and at Luigi Rossini's Rossini Opera Workshop. She made her Broadway debut at the age of 15 as Fritzi in the 1943 revival of Blossom Time, which ran for a total of 43 performances. She returned to Broadway in 1945 to portray Betty Ellis in the short-lived musical The Girl From Nantucket with Jane Kean as Dodey Ellis and Helen Raymond as Keziah Getchel.

On October 24, 1946, Bishop made her professional opera debut as Blonde in Mozart's Die Entführung aus dem Serail with the American Opera Company at the Academy of Music in Philadelphia. The following December, she returned to Broadway as Gretchen in the revival of Victor Herbert's The Red Mill when the production moved to the Shubert Theatre from the 46th Street Theatre. In January 1948, Bishop returned to Philadelphia to portray Letitia in Gian Carlo Menotti's The Old Maid and the Thief. The composer attended one of the performances and was so impressed with Bishop that he contacted Laszlo Halasz, director of the NYCO, and told him he had to hire her. This led to her being offered a contract with the NYCO and her debut with the company as Gilda in Verdi's Rigoletto on April 18, 1948.

== The New York City Opera years: 1948–1960 ==
After this point, Bishop's career decidedly oriented away from musical theatre to opera. Even her two remaining Broadway parts were in opera productions: the role of Lucia in the United States premiere of Britten's The Rape of Lucretia (1948) at the Ziegfeld Theatre and Adele in Johann Strauss II's Die Fledermaus (1954) with the New York City Center Light Opera Company. She quickly became a favorite at the NYCO during the late 1940s and went on to portray many lyric soprano roles with the company through 1960, including The Stepdaughter in the world premiere of Hugo Weisgall's Six Characters in Search of an Author (1959) and Mary Stone in the New York premiere of Douglas Moore's The Devil and Daniel Webster (1959). Among her many other roles with the NYCO were Gretel in Humperdinck's Hänsel und Gretel, Liù in Puccini's Turandot, Musetta in Puccini's La bohème, Norina in Donizetti's Don Pasquale, Olympia in Offenbach's Les contes d'Hoffmann, Sophie in Richard Strauss's Der Rosenkavalier, and Susanna in Mozart's Le nozze di Figaro.

While mainly performing with the NYCO, Bishop also occasionally performed with other organizations. In 1949 she sang Gilda with the Philadelphia La Scala Opera Company with Cesare Bardelli as Rigoletto, Rudolf Petrak as the Duke of Mantua, and conductor Giuseppe Bamboschek. That same year she made her first appearance at the Central City Opera in Colorado as Adele, later returning to sing roles in two operas by Gounod: Juliet in Romeo et Juliet (1951) and Marguerite in Faust (1954). In 1950 she portrayed Adele in a television recording of Die Fledermaus with the NBC Opera Theatre. In 1951 she made her first appearance with New Orleans Opera as Susanna to the Countess of Frances Yeend and Cherubino of Frances Bible, later returning to the house to portray Kathie in Sigmund Romberg's The Student Prince opposite Brian Sullivan as Karl in 1953. She portrayed Estelle in the premiere of the orchestrated version of Weisgall's The Stronger in August 1955 for the Composers Forum at Columbia University. That 1955 performance with the Columbia Chamber Orchestra was recorded.

In 1956 Bishop sang Lucia again opposite Jon Vickers's Male Chorus and Regina Resnik's Lucretia at the renowned Stratford Festival in Canada. In 1956, again with NBC Opera Theatre, she portrayed Papagena in an English-language version of Mozart's The Magic Flute, a production which also featured Leontyne Price as Pamina, in an almost unheard-of 1950s example of television "color-blind casting". In 1957, she returned to NBC to appear in the world premiere telecast of Stanley Hollingsworth's La Grande Breteche. She portrayed Queen Popotte in the United States premiere of Offenbach's Le Voyage dans la Lune in 1958, which was also the very first production mounted by Sarah Caldwell's Opera Company of Boston. The production was so well received that the company was invited to present the work on the lawn of the White House in a performance attended by President Dwight D. Eisenhower. She returned to Boston the following season for their production of The Beggar's Opera.

Of all the roles Bishop sang, she is most remembered for her portrayal of the title role in the world premiere of Lukas Foss's Griffelkin, which was written for television. Made by the NBC Opera Theater, the work premiered on NBC in 1955 and was viewed by an estimated audience of one million people. Opera News said in their review at the time: "In Griffelkin, Lukas Foss is almost too brilliant for his own good. Adelaide Bishop, creating the title role, saved the day. Extraordinarily impish in appearance, she not only sang like an inspired choirboy but succeeded in bringing wonder and a heartbreaking confusion into the scenes when the small hero is seized with the first pangs of humanity."

== Work as an opera director and voice teacher ==
Beginning in the late 1950s, Bishop became highly active working as a stage director, competition judge, and voice teacher. As a stage director, she worked on productions for many companies throughout the United States. The operas she staged came from a broad range of repertoire, including standard works like La traviata and Il Barbiere di Siviglia, as well as twentieth-century American works such as Summer and Smoke, The Crucible, and The Medium, to name just a few. Bishop notably staged the world premiere of David Amram's Twelfth Night at the Lake George Opera in 1968.

As an educator, Bishop worked on the music faculties of Carnegie Mellon University and the Mannes College The New School for Music, teaching voice and directing student opera productions. She also served for fourteen years as the chair of the opera department at Boston University (1970–1984) and chairwoman of the opera department and artistic director of the opera theater at the Hartt School (1982–1993). Bishop also worked as Artistic Director of the Wolf Trap Opera, a summer opera training program for young opera singers.

== Personal life ==
Bishop married twice, first to Eugene Deatrick and then to Bertram Schur. She has one son, Peyton Deatrick Schur, and one grandson, Kyle Schur.

Bishop died in a car accident in Sarasota, Florida just three days shy of her eightieth birthday.
