= Andrew McKinley =

American opera singer

McKinley as the magician Nika Magadoff from an article in Harper's Bazaar (1950).

Andrew McKinley (1903 – 11 January 1996) was an American operatic tenor, violinist, arts administrator, music educator, and school administrator. Although he mainly performed in the United States, he had an active international singing career with major opera companies and symphony orchestras from the 1940s through the 1960s. His repertoire spanned a wide range, from leading tenor parts to character roles.

As a performer McKinley is best remembered for creating roles in the world premieres of two operas by Gian Carlo Menotti: Nika Magadoff in the Pulitzer Prize winning The Consul (1950) and King Kaspar in the Peabody Award winning Amahl and the Night Visitors (1951). The latter opera was made by the NBC Opera Theatre, and McKinley filmed several more operas with that organization during his career. He also taught violin at the Juilliard School of Music for almost four decades and in 1968 founded the Usdan Center for the Creative and Performing Arts in Wheatley Heights, Long Island.

== Early life and career ==
Born in Pittsburgh, McKinley entered the Institute of Musical Art (now the Juilliard School) as a violin major in 1922. He later joined the violin faculty of the school's pre-college division in the early 1930s; remaining as an instructor at Juilliard until 1970. While a student at Juilliard he began performing as a violinist, mainly in orchestras and chamber ensembles. He continued to play the violin for the rest of his life.

Although his performance career started and finished as a violinist, McKinley became more well known to audiences internationally for his work as a singer. He began his singing career as a concert singer in the United States, but had his first major successes when he branched out into opera in the 1940s. He appeared with several leading opera houses in both the United States and Europe during his career, including the Glyndebourne Festival Opera where he was seen as Malcolm in Giuseppe Verdi's Macbeth in 1947.

In 1946 McKinley made his debut with the Boston Symphony Orchestra as the tenor soloist for performances of Giuseppe Verdi's Messa da Requiem with Frances Yeend as the soprano soloist. He later sang Verdi's Requiem with Yeend again for his debut performance with the Philadelphia Orchestra in 1951 under conductor Eugene Ormandy. Also in 1946, he sang in radio broadcasts with the NBC Symphony Orchestra under conductor Arturo Toscanini. In 1946–1947 he was committed to the Philadelphia La Scala Opera Company; making his debut with the company as Turiddu in Cavalleria rusticana with Elda Ercole and Herva Nelli alternating in the role of Santuzza. In 1950 he returned to Philadelphia to create the role of Nika Magadoff in the world premiere of Gian Carlo Menotti's The Consul, and continued with the production when it moved to Broadway later that year. He also sang the part at La Scala in Milan in 1951.

In 1952 McKinley made his first appearance with the Chicago Symphony Orchestra as the tenor soloist in Ludwig van Beethoven's Symphony No. 9 at the Ravinia Festival with fellow soloists Eileen Farrell, Jane Hobson, and Mack Harrell. That same year he was the tenor soloist in Hector Berlioz's Requiem with conductor Charles Munch and the Boston Symphony Orchestra at the Tanglewood Festival. In 1953 he portrayed Prince Shuisky to George London's Boris Godunov at the Metropolitan Opera. That same year he sang the role of Nika Magadoff again with the Philadelphia Orchestra.

In 1954 McKinley sang in the very first season of the Lyric Opera of Chicago; appearing as Grumio in Vittorio Giannini's The Taming of the Shrew. He also sang in concert performances with the Baltimore Symphony Orchestra that year; including singing Prince Shuisky to the Boris of Jerome Hines and the title part in Berlioz's La damnation de Faust. He returned to Baltimore in 1956 to sing the role of Camille in Franz Lehár's The Merry Widow. In 1957 he was the tenor soloist in the world premiere of Cecil Effinger's oratorio The Invisible Fire at Hoch Auditorium in Lawrence, Kansas with the Kansas City Philharmonic under conductor Thor Johnson.

== Amahl and other work for the NBC Opera Theatre ==
After the critical success of The Consul, Menotti was invited by NBC to compose an opera for television which was to be performed by the newly created NBC Opera Theatre (NBCOT). What resulted was the highly successful Christmas opera Amahl and the Night Visitors which was premiered on Christmas Eve of 1951 in a national broadcast to millions. For this production, Menotti enlisted the forces of many of the singers from The Consul; including McKinley who was cast in the role of King Kaspar. Menotti's story portrayed Kaspar as being hard of hearing and once joked that he had written it so because his brother "had always believed one of the kings was deaf since he never got all the presents he’d asked for". McKinley continued to play Kaspar, along with the other original adult cast members, for annual live television broadcasts up through 1964. They also gave annual national tours of Amahl, performing with symphony orchestras in concerts throughout the United States.

Amahl and the Night Visitors was a triumph for the NBC Opera Theatre, and McKinley was soon engaged by NBC to perform in several other opera broadcasts on the television program NBC Television Opera Theatre. He sang in two more world premieres for the NBCOT; the roles of Anuchkin in Bohuslav Martinů's The Marriage (1953) and "The Voice of the Letterbox" in Lukas Foss' Griffelkin (1955). Some of the other roles he filmed with the company included Captain Vere in Benjamin Britten's Billy Budd (1952), Herodes in Richard Strauss' Salome (1954), Monostatos in Wolfgang Amadeus Mozart's The Magic Flute (1956), and Prince Shuisky in Modest Mussorgsky's Boris Godunov (1957).

== Later life and career as an educator ==
After retiring from his singing career in the mid-1960s, McKinley continued to perform occasionally as an ensemble player on the violin. In 1958 he resigned from his post as director of the Bronx House Music School (a position he had held since 1923). That same year he founded the Suzanne and Nathaniel Usdan Center for the Creative and Performing Arts, a summer music camp in Wheatley Heights, Long Island. He remained involved with the camp up into the latter years of his life. He notably helped establish a 40-concert summer festival sponsored by the Center. He died at the age of 92 at St. Luke's-Roosevelt Hospital Center in Manhattan. He was married to the concert pianist and academic Lily Miki McKinley.
