= Griffelkin =

1955 TV opera by Lukas Foss

- Opera by Lukas Foss
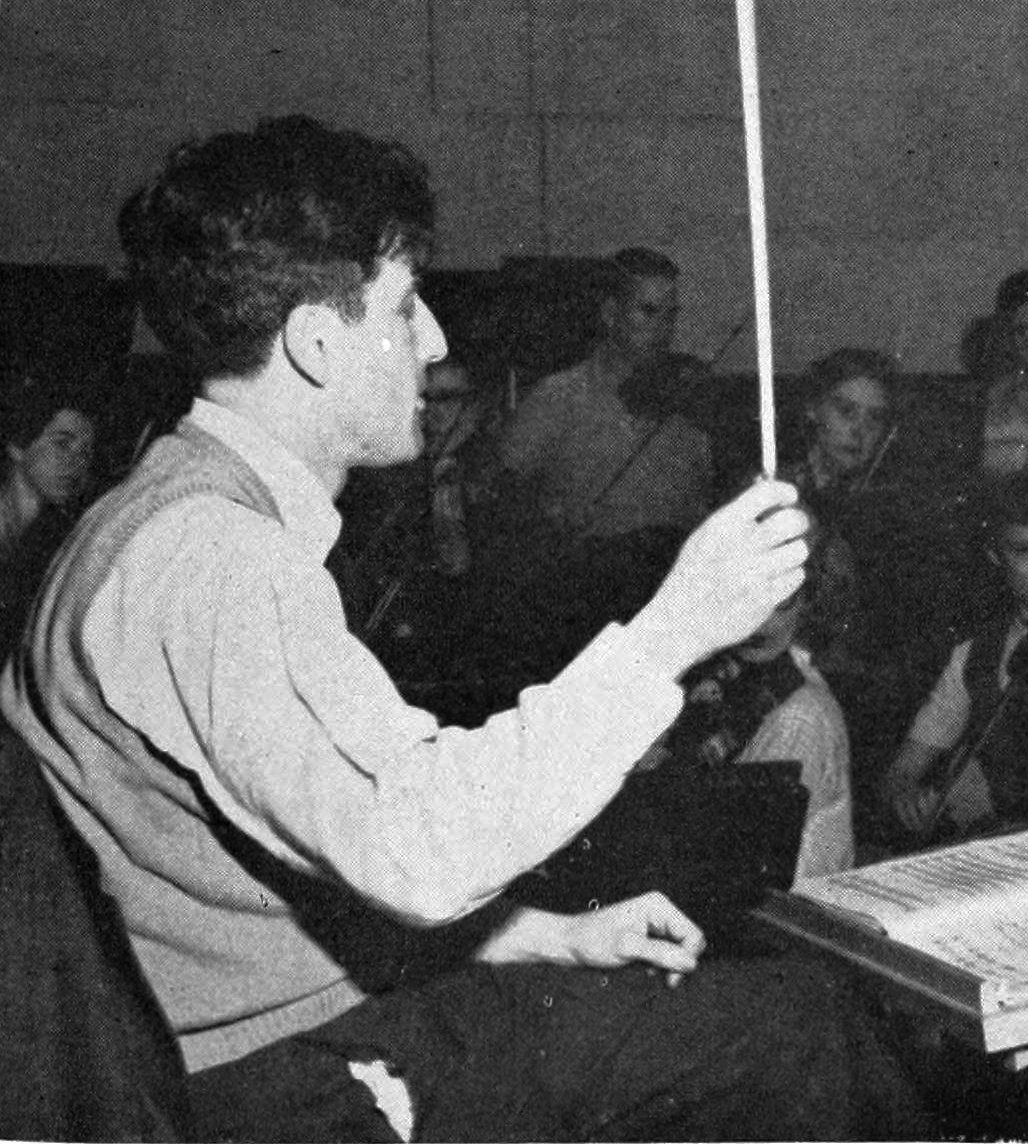
- The composer in 1960
- Librettist: Alastair Reid
- Language: English
- Premiere: November 6, 1955 (telecast); NBC Opera Theatre

Griffelkin is an opera in three acts by Lukas Foss with a libretto by Alastair Reid. The opera was first performed on November 6, 1955, in a nationwide telecast by the NBC Opera Theatre.

== Background ==
Following the success of Gian Carlo Menotti's Amahl and the Night Visitors, NBC decided to present new operas by other American composers and gave Foss a commission for the work. (Other composers involved in the project included Norman Dello Joio, Stanley Hollingsworth, and Leonard Kastle.)

Griffelkin's plot is based on a story that Foss's mother told him when he was a child. Foss composed an early version of the opera shortly afterward.

== Roles ==
Roles, voice types, premiere cast
Role	Voice type	Premiere cast November 6, 1955 Conductor: Peter Herman Adler
Griffelkin	soprano	Adelaide Bishop
The Devil's Grandmother	mezzo-soprano	Mary Kreste
The Mother	mezzo-soprano	Alice Richmond
The Girl	soprano	Rose Gerenger
The Boy	treble	Oliver Andes
The Policeman	bass-baritone	Lee Cass
The Shopkeeper	tenor	Robert Holland
Uncle Skelter	baritone	Paul Ukena
The Statue	silent role	Margery Gray
The Voice of the Statue	mezzo-soprano	Mignon Dunn
The Letter Box	silent role	Gerald Arpino
The Voice of the Letterbox	tenor	Andrew McKinley
The Lion	bass-baritone	Chester Watson

== Synopsis ==
Griffelkin is a young devil residing in hell's nursery. On his tenth birthday, he is allowed to spend a day on earth to do as many bad deeds as he can. To aid him in the task, he is given a magic potion that will bring objects to life.

Griffelkin arrives in a city and causes havoc by bringing a statue, a mailbox, and a pair of stone lions to life. He is soon drawn to a human girl about his age. To impress her, he transforms a storeful of toys into a ballet troupe. However, the girl runs home to check on her sick mother, leaving Griffelkin to search for her while being chased by the townspeople and the lions.

Later that evening, Griffelkin finds the girl and her brother mourning their mother's death. Moved by their plight, he secretly uses the last of his potion to bring the mother back to life. As the family is reunited, Griffelkin dissolves in tears.

His day on earth at an end, Griffelkin is summoned back to hell, where his outraged fellow devils place him on trial for his compassionate conduct. Griffelkin is found guilty; as punishment, he is transformed into a human boy and banished from hell.

Griffelkin then returns to the city and again finds the girl and her family, who remember the events only as a bad dream. When the family invites Griffelkin to live with them, he happily accepts.

== Productions ==
The original 1955 NBC production starred Adelaide Bishop as Griffelkin and featured sets and costumes by Rouben Ter-Arutunian and choreography by Robert Joffrey. The opera's stage premiere took place the next year at the Tanglewood Music Festival with Mildred Allen in the title role. The opera has received several revivals, most notably by the New York City Opera in 1993 and the Manhattan School of Music in 2007.

In 2002, the Boston Modern Orchestra Project presented Griffelkin at Tanglewood in a concert performance honoring Lukas Foss's 80th birthday. The group recorded the opera shortly thereafter.

== Recordings ==
- CD: Boston Modern Orchestra Project, Gil Rose, conductor. Chandos Records: CHAN 10067.
- A video recording of the 1955 premiere is available at the Paley Center for Media.

== See also ==
- H-E Double Hockey Sticks, a film loosely based on the opera
