= Hold On to Love =

Hold On to Love may refer to:

- "Hold On to Love" (Peter Skellern song)
- "Hold On to Love" (Aiko Kayō song)
- "I Want You (Hold On to Love)", a song by Cee Lo Green
- "Hold On to Love", a song by Gary Moore from the album Victims of the Future
- "Hold On to Love", a song by Jon Anderson from the album In the City of Angels
- "Hold On to Love", a song by Rabbitt from the album Revival
- "Hold On to Love", a song by T'Pau from the album The Promise

== See also ==
- Hold On to Your Love (disambiguation)
