= Sebastian Forbes =

Sebastian Forbes (born 22 May 1941) is a musical composer, conductor, founder of the Aeolian Singers and professor of music at the University of Surrey. He comes from a musical family, his father being the Scottish violist, Watson Forbes.

== Biography ==
After being trained as a singer by Martindale Sidwell and encountering chamber and classical music through his father, Sebastian studied at the Royal Academy of Music and then to Cambridge University, where he sang with the King's College chapel choir.

After Cambridge, he founded the Aeolian Singers in 1963. He then became a producer for the BBC until moving back to Cambridge in 1968. That year, he lectured at Bangor University and remained there until 1972, when he moved to Surrey.

The University of Surrey had completed its move from the original campus in Battersea in 1970, so the music department was very new. He has been with the university since then, being made a professor in 1981 and then the Head of the Music Department for the next ten years. In 2006, he was made professor emeritus.

== Composer ==
His principal compositions include the Piano Quintet (winner of the Clements Memorial Prize in 1963), five string quartets (from 1969 to 2000), Death's Dominion (1971), Symphony in Two Movements (1972), Sonata for 21 (1975), Voices of Autumn (1975), Sonata for 8 (1978), Violin Fantasy No 2 (1979), Evening Canticles (1980-2008), Sonata for 17 (1987), Bristol Mass (1990), Hymn to St Etheldreda (1995), Sonata-Rondo for piano (1996), Rawsthorne Reflections for organ (1998), Sonata for 15 (2001), Interplay 2 for four pianists (2002), Duo for clarinet and piano (2003), and Hurrah! for Brunel, a cantata for young voices (2007)

Forbes has also composed numerous compositions for the viola, such as Crete Songs for baritone (or mezzo-soprano), viola and piano (1966), Viola Fantasy for viola solo (1979) and St Andrews Solo for viola solo (2009), the latter recorded by Martin Outram in 2012.

In 1977, he composed Quam Dilecta for a commission by St Matthew's Church, Northampton.

Gervase de Peyer, the clarinetist played one of his clarinet concertos.

== See also ==
- University of Surrey
