= Mignon Dunn =

American mezzo-soprano and voice teacher (1928–2026)

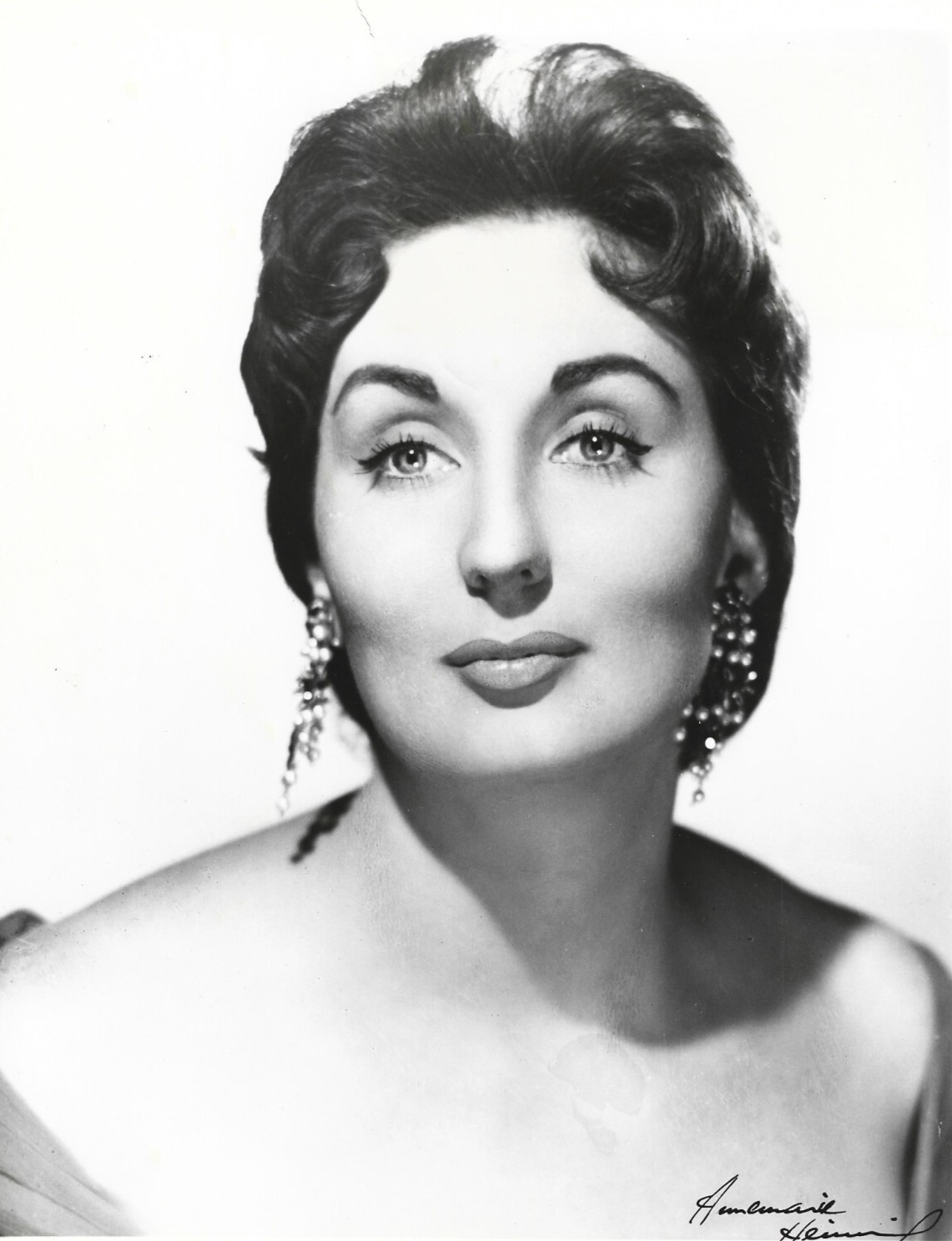
- Dunn in 1960
- Born: Mignon Armistead Dunn; June 17, 1928; Memphis, Tennessee, U.S.
- Died: June 28, 2026 (aged 98); Colorado Springs, Colorado, U.S.
- Education: Southwestern College
- Occupations: Mezzo-soprano, voice teacher
- Years active: 1955–2023
- Spouse: Kurt Klippstätter (m. 1972; died 2000)

Mignon Armistead Dunn (June 17, 1928 – June 28, 2026) was an American dramatic mezzo-soprano and voice teacher. In her professional debut in New Orleans in 1955, she starred in the title role of Bizet's Carmen, which became one of her signature roles. She performed at leading opera houses in Europe and the Americas, especially at the Metropolitan Opera from 1958 to 1994. After 15 years of performing mostly supporting roles there, she had her breakthrough as Azucena in Verdi's Il trovatore, and then performed lead roles in Italian, French, German and Czech repertoire, including Mère Marie in Poulenc's Dialogues des Carmélites, Kundry in Wagner's Parsifal, Herodias in Strauss's Salome, and the Kostelnicka in Janáček's Jenůfa.

Dunn taught voice at several music academies of the United States, ending her teaching career as a member of the voice faculty of the Manhattan School of Music from 1985 to 2023.

== Early life ==
Mignon Armistead Dunn was born in Memphis, Tennessee, on June 17, 1928. Her parents were Christine Lundee and Dudley Dunn, who ran a plantation cotton farm in Arkansas. She grew up with two elder sisters in Tyronza, Arkansas, where she was exposed to the Black musical traditions of African Americans in Arkansas, including spirituals, gospel music, and the blues.

At the age of five, Dunn began singing for local service organizations such as the Rotary Club. She would often listen to African Americans singing during baptisms held in the Tyronza River. At home, her nursemaid, who played piano by ear, would play songs for her like "Shortnin' Bread" and "Swing Low, Sweet Chariot". Her father, the son of Mississippi River boat captain Grey Dunn and a veteran of World War I, died in 1934. After her parents' cotton farm burned down in the 1940s, the family moved back to Memphis.

During her childhood, she also listened to the Metropolitan Opera's Saturday matinee radio broadcasts. A visit to see Verdi's Aida with her mother at the age of ten left a lasting impression. After graduating from the Lausanne School for Girls in 1945, Dunn attended Southwestern College (now Rhodes College) in Memphis, where she sang in the chorus of the Memphis Open Air Theater. When James Melton, a tenor of the Metropolitan Opera, performed with the company, she sang for him, because his mother and her mother were friends. He recommended her for a scholarship from the Metropolitan Opera, and she moved with her mother to New York City in the late 1940s. She studied music privately with Karin Branzell.

== Career ==
=== Operatic career ===
Dunn made her professional debut in the title role of Bizet's Carmen on September 8, 1955, at the Opera in New Orleans. It became one of her signature roles, performed more than 400 times, in four languages. In 1955, she took part in the world premiere of Griffelkin, a television opera by Lucas Foss performed by the NBC in New York City. She appeared as Maddalena in Verdi's Rigoletto in Chicago that same year. In her early career, she made some money singing in German restaurants and beer halls in the Yorkville neighborhood and as a guide at LaGuardia Airport, but she failed an audition for the Radio City Music Hall chorus. On March 28, 1956, Dunn made her New York City Opera debut as the 4th Lady in Walton's Troilus and Cressida, followed by Carmen the same year. She returned to the company in several other roles, including Carlisle Floyd's in 1956 Susannah and Mrs. Quickly in Verdi's Falstaff in 1996. In 1964, she took part in the world premiere of Robert Ward's The Lady from Colorado at the Central City Opera Festival.

==== Metropolitan Opera ====
Dunn made her debut with the Metropolitan Opera in New York City in 1958, as the Nurse in Mussorgsky's Boris Godunov, conducted by Dimitri Mitropoulos. She appeared mostly in supporting roles at the house for 15 years, including Marthe in Gounod's Faust, Mary in Wagner's Der fliegende Holländer, both Madelon and Countess Coigny in Giordano's Andrea Chénier, the Princess in Cilea's Adriana Lecouvreur, both Lola and Mamma Lucia in Mascagni's Cavalleria rusticana, Filipjevna in Tchaikovsky's Eugene Onegin and a Flower Girl in Wagner's Parsifal. She appeared as Flosshilde in a 1961 production of Wagner's Götterdämmerung conducted by Erich Leinsdorf with Birgit Nilsson as Brünnhilde and Hans Hopf as Siegfried that was recorded. She portrayed Carmen in 1969, stepping in for Regina Resnik. In 1971, she performed as Brangäne in Wagner's Tristan und Isolde alongside Nilsson and Jess Thomas in the title roles, conducted by Leinsdorf. A reviewer from the Columbia Daily Spectator compared her warnings during the love duet to "dreamy woodwind solos".

She made her breakthrough in 1973 as Azucena in Verdi's Il trovatore, and performed as Anna in a new production of Les Troyens by Berlioz. She appeared as Waltraute in Götterdämmerung in 1974, again with Nilsson as Brünnhilde, in a production conceived by noted conductor Herbert von Karajan but conducted by Rafael Kubelík; Paul Jackson reviewed the live-broadcast in his book Start Up at the New Met, noting that he would have preferred more volume, especially in the low register, but was impressed by her emotional reading, supported by a "belief in Waltraute's mission", with a "moving description of her father's gloom" and a closing "grandly scaled plea". In 1982, Dunn portrayed Kundry in Parsifal, alongside Peter Hofmann in the title role, conducted by James Levine. She appeared as Fricka in Wagner's Die Walküre in 1983 alongside Franz Ferdinand Nentwig as her husband Wotan, conducted by Silvio Varviso. Donal Henahan from The New York Times noted that in the couple's confrontation, which "can seem long and tiresome", they held the tension, he with a "noble bearing in spite of being humiliated and defeated at every step", and she with a "fresh and steady" mezzo, neither harsh nor nasty. She shared her thoughts about Kundry's and Fricka's characters in an interview in 1984.

Dunn performed for the company more than 650 times, including Verdi roles such as Eboli in Don Carlos, Preziosilla in La forza del destino, Fenena in Nabucco and Federica in Luisa Miller, Venus in Wagner's Tannhäuser, Dalila in Samson et Dalila by Saint-Saëns, Santuzza in Cavalleria rusticana, as well as Strauss roles such as the Nurse in Die Frau ohne Schatten, Adelaide in Arabella, Herodias in Salome and Klytämnestra in Elektra, the Kostelnicka in Janáček's Jenůfa, Suzuki in Puccini's Madama Butterfly, Geneviève in Debussy's Pelléas et Mélisande, Laura and La Cieca in Ponchielli's La gioconda and Ortrud in Wagner's Lohengrin. She also appeared as Mère Marie in Poulenc's Dialogues des Carmélites. Her last performance at the house was as Klytämnestra in 1994.

==== Other companies ====
Dunn was also a member of the Deutsche Oper am Rhein, where she appeared as Azucena, Carmen, Eboli and Dalila. She had a guest contract with the Hamburg State Opera for several years.

She performed as Brangäne in Tristan und Isolde at the San Francisco Opera in 1967, where she also appeared as Baba the Turk in Stravinsky's The Rake's Progress, Ulrica in Verdi's Un ballo in maschera and as Erda in Wagner's Ring cycle.

Dunn performed as a guest soloist at the Arena di Verona as Carmen in 1970, directed by Luca Ronconi, at the Vienna State Opera in 1973 and 1974 as Carmen and Amneris in Aida, and as the Nurse in Die Frau ohne Schatten at the Israeli Opera in Tel Aviv in 1975. She portrayed Dulcinée in Massenet's Don Quichotte with the Opera Company of Boston in 1974, directed and conducted by Sarah Caldwell, and with Noel Tyl in the title role. She appeared at the Paris Opera as Azucena in 1973 and as the Nurse in 1980. In 1976, she portrayed Susan B. Anthony, a 19th-century American women's rights activist, at the Santa Fe Opera in Virgil Thomson's The Mother of Us All. The production, conducted by Raymond Leppard, was recorded as the company's first commercial recording.

She performed as Ulrica at Grand Théâtre de Genève in 1984 and as the Nurse at La Scala in Milan in 1988. The same year, she appeared at the Lyric Opera of Chicago as Jezibaba in Dvořák's Rusalka and as Amneris, in 1989 as the Kostelnicka at the Festival dei Due Mondi in Spoleto and as Klytämnestra at the Washington Open. She appeared as Herodias at the Liceu in Barcelona in 1990. In 1993 she was a guest at the Opera in New Orleans as Mrs. Quickly, in 1994 at the Opera Philadelphia as Gertrude in Gounod's Roméo et Juliette, in 1996 at the Detroit Opera as Herodias, in 1998 at the Fort Worth Opera as Mary in Der fliegende Holländer, and in 1999 at the Baltimore Opera as Filipjevna in Eugene Onegin. She took part in the world premiere of Robert Di Domenico's The Balcony at the Boston Opera on June 14, 1990. She also performed in Europe at the Royal Opera House in London, the Bolshoi Theatre in Moscow, Grand Theatre, Warsaw, Deutsche Oper Berlin, Oper Frankfurt, and the Deutsche Oper am Rhein. In Latin America, she performed at the Teatro Colón in Buenos Aires, the Municipal Theatre of Santiago in Chile, Palacio de Bellas Artes in Mexico, and the Opera of Puerto Rico. In Canada she performed with the Canadian Opera Company in Toronto and the Opéra de Montréal. In the United States, she appeared at the Santa Fe Opera and Florida Grand Opera in Miami.

Dunn also appeared as Giulietta in Offenbach's The Tales of Hoffmann, She performed in Czech as the Kabanicha in Janáček's Káťa Kabanová. Her Spanish repertoire included Goyescas by Enrique Granados and De Falla's La vida breve. She said in an interview that she was "a funny lady" and would have liked to get more funny roles; she enjoyed Adelaide in Arabella as a role that came wit a waltz.

=== Concerts ===
Dunn performed recitals all over Europe and the United States and sang with many major symphony orchestras including the New York Philharmonic and the orchestras of Chicago, Los Angeles, Philadelphia, Detroit, Cincinnati, Hamburg, and Vienna. She sang the alto solo in Mahler's Symphony No. 2 with the Israel Philharmonic Orchestra conducted by Zubin Mehta in both Tel Aviv and Jerusalem in 1975. She performed the mezzo-soprano solo in Verdi's Requiem in a telecast concert in Paris in 1981, alongside Liljana Molnar Talajic, Carlo Bergonzi and Martti Talvela, with the Orchestre National de France and the Choeur de Radio France, conducted by Nello Santi.

=== Recordings ===
Dunn is featured in two recordings of Ponchielli's La gioconda with Franco Corelli, in 1964 alongside Mary Curtis-Verna in the title role, and in 1966 with Renata Tebaldi. She recorded Salome in 1970, live from the Hamburg State Opera with Karl Böhm conducting, alongside Gwyneth Jones in the title role, Dietrich Fischer-Dieskau as Jochanaan, and Richard Cassilly as Herodes. She recorded Verdi's Requiem in 1975, alongside Joyce Barker, Ermanno Mauro and Paul Plishka, with the Orchestre philharmonique de Strasbourg and the Slovak Philharmonic Choir conducted by Alain Lombard. She recorded Verdi's Rigoletto in 1978, with Julius Rudel conducting the Philharmonia Orchestra, alongside Beverly Sills as Gilda, Alfredo Kraus as the Duke, and Sherrill Milnes in the title role.

Dunn took part in several broadcasts live from the Met; the broadcast of Elektra from the 1980s was later published on DVD. It featured Nilsson in the title role, Leonie Rysanek as Chrysothemis, and Donald McIntyre as Orest, conducted by Levine. A reviewer from Classics Today noted that she gave "a suitably imperious quality to the role of Klytämnestra, and with it gave the part the lyrical quality that some performers eschew in deference to readings that can be closer to Sprechstimme". She recorded Verdi's Il trovatore with the Orchestre philharmonique de Radio France in a production presented in Paris and at the Orange Festival, with Teresa Żylis-Gara as Leonora, conducted by Luis Antonio García Navarro in 1981.

=== Teaching ===
Dunn taught voice at the University of Texas at Austin, University of Illinois Urbana-Champaign, Northwestern University, Brooklyn College and the International Vocal Arts Institute. She was a professor of the voice faculty of the Manhattan School of Music from 1985 until 2023.

== Personal life ==
Dunn's first marriage ended in divorce; she was then married to Austrian conductor Kurt Klippstätter from 1972 until his death on January 4, 2000. In the 1970s, the couple lived in Little Rock, Arkansas, where her husband led the Arkansas Symphony Orchestra and taught at universities; they had no children. Dunn died at a care facility in Colorado Springs, Colorado, on June 28, 2026, at the age of 98.

She often spoke to reporters about how her early life growing up on a cotton plantation in Northeast Arkansas influenced her later life as an opera singer. She said she enjoyed singing barefoot and referred to herself as "an operatic Loretta Lynn." Her childhood exposure to the Black music of Arkansas led her to declare that "soul music is in opera", explaining how her unique background informed her roles and stylized her approach. For Saint-Saëns' Samson et Dalila, she maintained that she was in fact "singing the blues to Samson".

Dunn also recalled the hazards of working in opera. In Verona, Italy, she said she feared being mobbed by audiences when leaving the theater, forcing her to use alternate exits. "When you come out the stage door you don't know if you'll have any clothes left on". In another incident, a horse fell from the stage into the orchestra pit, which she said was "bad for the horse and bad for me, too." Dunn also remembered being struck by the collapsing temple during several performances of Samson et Dalila in other cities. In one production in Chile, the set designers had used large, heavy objects to enhance the sound of the temple's destruction. She quipped that "they lost a couple of extras each performance."

== Honors and recognition ==
In 1974, Dunn received an honorary degree from Rhodes College in Memphis, Tennessee. In 2011, Dunn was awarded the President's Medal for Distinguished Faculty Service from Manhattan School of Music. Dunn received the Sherrill Milnes Voice Award in 2014 for her outstanding contribution to teaching and mentoring the next generation of opera singers. In 2019, she received the VERA Award from The Voice Foundation, and the Artist Excellence Award from the Giulio Gari Foundation.
