= Hold On to Your Love =

Hold On to Your Love may refer to:

- "Hold On to Your Love" (Smokey Robinson song)
- "Hold On to Your Love" (Taylor Hicks song)
- "Hold On to Your Love" (Tom Chaplin song)

== See also ==
- Hold On to Love (disambiguation)
