= Hughie Prince =

American songwriter (1906–1960)

Hughie Prince in Buck Privates (1941)

Hugh Durham Prince (9 August 1906 – 15 January 1960) was an American film composer and songwriter. He composed "Boogie Woogie Bugle Boy" with lyricist Don Raye for the movie comedy, Buck Privates, which was nominated for an Academy Award for Best Song in 1942.

== Biography ==
Hugh Prince was born in Greenville, South Carolina, United States. In 1920 he was living with his parents on Westover Avenue in Norfolk, Virginia. His father died in 1921 and by the 1930s Prince was living with his mother in Queens in New York where he worked as a stage actor. During the 1940s, Prince and his mother were living in New York City where he worked as a songwriter in the music industry.

His music was used in more than 56 film and television productions. From 1940, he composed film music, starting with "Hit the Road" and "Rhumboogie" for the film Argentine Nights. In 1940, Prince and Don Raye wrote the song "Boogie Woogie Bugle Boy", sung by the Andrews Sisters, in the 1941 film comedy, Buck Privates, with Bud Abbott and Lou Costello in the lead roles and gaining as Oscar nomination in the Best Song category. However, the statue went to Jerome Kern and Oscar Hammerstein II for their song "The Last Time I Saw Paris" from the film musical Lady Be Good. Prince had a small role as Henry in Buck Privates. "Boogie Woogie Bugle Boy" remained the most successful song by Prince and, even after his death, it was used in feature films, television productions and shows. He wrote additional music for The Girl from Nantucket, and composed the score, wrote the lyrics and the script and directed the film drama The Strip Tease Murder Case in 1950.

Prince died in New York, United States in 1960, aged 53, and was buried in Maple Grove Cemetery in Rutland County in Vermont.

== Songs (selection) ==
- 1939 "She Had to Go and Lose It at the Astor" – with Don Raye
- 1941: "Boogie Woogie Bugle Boy", "Bounce Me Brother with a Solid Four", "When Private Brown Becomes a Captain", "You're a Lucky Fellow, Mr. Smith", "I Wish You Were Here"—composed with Don Raye for the movie Buck Privates
- 1941: "You're a Lucky Fellow, Mr. Smith" used in the movie In the Navy
- 1941: "Beat Me Daddy, Eight to the Bar" used in the short film In the Groove
- 1944: "Boogie Woogie Bugle Boy" used in Follow the Boys
- 1944: "Sing" from the movie Moonlight and Cactus
- 1944: "Let's Have Another One" from the movie Dreaming
- 1946: "Solid Potato Salad" from the movie Breakfast in Hollywood
- 1946: "Bounce Me Brother with a Solid Four" used in One Exciting Week
- 1947: "Bounce Me Brother with a Solid Four" used in The Egg and I
- 1953 "Pour Me a Glass of Teardrops" – with Dick Rogers
- 1962: "Rhumboogie" used in Term of Trial
- 1976: "Boogie Woogie Bugle Boy", used in the Bette Midler Show
- 1986: "Beat Me Daddy, Eight to the Bar", used in the 40th Annual Tony Awards
- 1988: "Boogie Woogie Bugle Boy" used in the television mini-series War and Remembrance
- 1992: "Boogie Woogie Bugle Boy" used in The Tonight Show starring Johnny Carson
- 1995: "Boogie Woogie Bugle Boy" used in Beautiful Is the Youth (Lust och fägring stor)
- 1997: "Boogie Woogie Bugle Boy" used in the television mini-series The Shining
- 2004: "Boogie Woogie Bugle Boy" used in Something the Lord Made
- 2009: "Boogie Woogie Bugle Boy" used in The Land of the Lost
- 2012: "Boogie Woogie Bugle Boy" used in Red Tails
- 2015: "Boogie Woogie Bugle Boy" used in Pitch Perfect 2
