= Moonlight and Cactus (1944 film) =

1944 film by Edward F. Cline

- Directed by: Edward F. Cline
- Written by: Eugene Conrad; Paul Gerard Smith
- Produced by: Frank Gross
- Starring: Leo Carrillo; The Andrews Sisters
- Cinematography: Jerome Ash
- Edited by: Ray Snyder
- Music by: Charles Previn; Hughie Prince; Vic Schoen
- Distributed by: Universal Pictures
- Release date: 1944
- Running time: 60 minutes
- Country: United States
- Language: English

Moonlight and Cactus is a 1944 American musical Western film featuring The Andrews Sisters. The screenplay concerns a ranch owner whose cattle are stolen.

== Plot ==
United States Merchant Marine Tom Garrison is the owner of a ranch being run by the Andrews Sisters, and all his cattle have been stolen. He hires neighbor Pasqualito Luigi to find the missing livestock.

== Cast ==
- Patty Andrews – Herself
- Maxene Andrews – Herself
- LaVerne Andrews – Herself
- Leo Carrillo – Pasqualito Luigi
- Tom Seidel – Tom Garrison
- Elyse Knox - Louise Ferguson
- Shemp Howard - Punchy Carter
