= You're a Lady (album) =

Studio album by Peter Skellern
- Released: 1972
- Recorded: 3 July – 29 August 1972
- Studio: Decca Studios, Tollington Park and West Hampstead
- Genre: Pop
- Length: 45:04
- Label: Decca
- Producer: Peter Sames

Peter Skellern chronology
You're a Lady (1972)	Not Without a Friend (1973)

Singles from You're a Lady
- 1. "You're a Lady" Released: 11 August 1972; 2. "Our Jackie's Getting Married" Released: 24 November 1972

You're a Lady is the debut album by English singer-songwriter Peter Skellern, released in 1972 by Decca Records. The album was named after Skellern's first single, issued in August 1972 and a number 3 hit on the UK Singles Chart. The album was recorded in five sessions at Decca Studios in London and established Skellern's unique musical style, encompassing influences from church music and northern brass band music, reflecting his Lancashire origin. A classically trained pianist, Skellern wrote the album while working as a porter at a hotel.

Despite the success of the title track, the album failed to chart, as did its other single "Our Jackie's Getting Married". The album was reissued in 2019 by Mint Audio as part of Peter Skellern: The Complete Decca Recordings, a release crowdfunded by fans through a Kickstarter campaign.

== Background ==
Born in Bury, Lancashire, Peter Skellern began piano lessons aged 9. By the age of 12, he was playing trombone in his school brass band, and by 16 he'd joined the National Youth Brass Band and was organist and choirmaster of St Paul's Church in Bury. He then studied Music at the Guildhall School of Music and Drama. After graduating with honours in 1968, Skellern struggled to make headway in a career as a concert pianist and instead focused on pursuing popular music. Skellern relocated to Dorset to live in a cottage in Shaftesbury with his wife Diana, and worked as a porter in a local hotel. During this time, Skellern wrote his first song "You're a Lady". Answering a Melody Maker advert, Skellern joined the band the March Hare as keyboardist. This gave the classically-trained musician experience in rock and pop. In June 1969, the March Hare released their only single on Deram Records - "Have We Got News For You" backed with "I Could Make It There With You" - both Skellern compositions.

The March Hare changed their name and style in 1970. Now making music with a country flavour, they became Harlan County. They released a self-titled album on short-lived Philips subsidiary Nashville, featuring three tracks co-written by Skellern, but failed to achieve any success and disbanded. Skellern continued to pursue a career in pop, represented by the band's manager Johnny Stirling. Stirling shopped Skellern's compositions around music publishers, leading to a record deal with Decca for recording and Warner Music for publishing. The deal was signed on 5 May 1972.

Skellern wrote the album in the summerhouse at his home in Shaftesbury. He kept his piano in the summerhouse so as not to bother anyone with his practice. Skellern's musical influences at this time included Liszt, Chopin, Marc Bolan, Cole Porter and Randy Newman.

== Recording ==
The recording of the album commenced at Decca's Studio 4 based in Tollington Park, London on 3 July 1972. Skellern was joined by handpicked session musicians, arranger Andrew Pryce Jackman and a choir consisting of members of The Congregation, a British pop ensemble formed by Roger Cook and Roger Greenaway whose recording of "Softly Whispering I Love You" had hit number 4 on the UK Singles Chart in January 1972. The session produced three tracks: the rock and roll-flavoured "Roll On Rhoda", "Manifesto" (recorded with the working title "Let the Tiger Roar") and "Apollo 11".

The following day, the Hanwell Band was added to the lineup and "You're a Lady" was recorded in six takes. Skellern sought to recapture the "speechless amazement" he felt playing in the National Youth Brass Band in his youth by using the brass band on the record. He also wanted the song to evoke the North of England, saying "I wanted people to see the wet cobblestones and the Lowry paintings when they heard "You're a Lady"". Described as a "a breathless love song", "You're a Lady" became Skellern's signature song. He performed the song live on many occasions prior to his retirement in 2001. It became a constant feature of his double act with Richard Stilgoe.

Recording continued on 7 August, this time at Decca Studio 2 in West Hampstead. This session produced "Every Home Should Have One", compared lyrically to the work of Peter Tinniswood by one reviewer, and "Our Jackie's Getting Married". The latter song's lyrics are written from the perspective of the titular Jackie, addressing his lover and telling her of the commotion he anticipates there will be when he tells his family about his plans to marry her. One verse has Jackie mimicking his mother's excited reaction to the news. Musically, the song incorporates an off-key piano and a brass band, which Skellern said nostalgically reminded him of a Northern wedding. Towards the end, a brief excerpt from Mendelssohn's "Wedding March" played on the Guildford Cathedral organ momentarily interrupts all other instrumentation. Another feature is a 'wound-up choir', a favourite studio effect of Skellern's. This effect was achieved by recording the choir at a slower speed making it sound higher and faster on normal speed playback.

The next session on 10 August 1972 was the most productive. It produced basic tracks for "Now I've Seen the Light" (called at this stage "Eyes to Lead the Blind"), "Ain't Life Something" (under the working title "The Veranda Song"), "Don't It Matter Anymore", "My Lonely Room", "A Sad Affair" and "All Last Night". These tracks were completed with overdubs over the next few days, before recording was paused for a few weeks for Skellern to promote the single release of "You're a Lady". The album was completed on 29 August 1972 with the recording of "Rock On" and the "funky" "Keep In In Your Own Backyard". The shuffling style of "Rock On" has garnered comparisons to the work of Randy Newman (particularly Newman's song "Mama Told Me Not to Come") and Alan Price.

== Release ==
You're a Lady was released in late 1972. The album was preceded by the title track's issue as Skellern's first single on 11 August 1972. "You're a Lady" was placed on Radio Luxembourg on a pay-for-play basis before being picked up by Terry Wogan on his BBC Radio 2 programme. It was Skellern's first and greatest chart success, peaking at number 3 on the UK Singles Chart. and selling over 800,000 copies It also charted at number 50 on the United States Billboard Hot 100. "Our Jackie's Getting Married" was issued as the follow-up on 24 November 1972. Skellern worried that fans wouldn't like the song as much as "You're a Lady" due to its difference in style. The single failed to chart. Skellern would later say the single was issued due to pressure from higher authorities. The song was a runner-up for Ivor Novello Award for Best Novelty Song in 1973, though Skellern didn't consider it one.

Despite the success of the title track, the album was a commercial disappointment. It failed to chart, and by April 1973 had sold only 6,000 copies. Skellern was reluctant to perform live, feeling he wasn't ready. On 29 May 1973, Skellern made his first live appearance, performing at a concert at the London Palladium for the charity KIDS. You're a Lady was issued on CD in 1989 by London Records, but availability was brief. In 2019, Mint Audio issued a remastered version of the album as part of Peter Skellern: The Complete Decca Recordings. This release was produced by sound engineer Richard Moore and crowdfunded by fans through a Kickstarter campaign. Skellern collaborators Richard Stilgoe and Tim Rice are listed among the executive producers.

== Reception ==
Upon release, Deborah Thomas of the Daily Mirror commented that You're a Lady has "a few interesting songs and a lot of sincerity, but some are too close to Gilbert and others haven't been developed far enough... ...for all that, I like it". Billboard recommended the album, noting "many flavours of music with steel guitar and banjo highlighted" and considered "Manifesto" and "Ain't Life Something" highlights. Harry Nilsson was reportedly a fan of the album.

The 2019 release of Peter Skellern: The Complete Decca Recordings prompted positive retrospective reviews. Writing in Record Collector, David Quantick described the album as "full of inventiveness and Skellern’s many voices, from the seaside postcard melancholy of "A Sad Affair" to the ragtime fun of "Now I’ve Seen It All" [sic]". Quantick opined "It sounds like nothing else released in a decade where anything was possible". In a five-star review of the boxset, Richard Allen of Shindig! described Skellern as "unjustly neglected", commenting "lush production values were a signature of his hit "You're a Lady" but that recording was just one aspect of his style" and praising Skellern's "distinctive vulnerable voice". Joe Marchese of The Second Disc described the set as "a stellar, persuasive tribute to the late artist", adding "as one of Peter Skellern’s songs goes, "Every Home Should Have One" indeed".

== Track listing ==
All songs written by Peter Skellern.

=== Side one ===
1. "You're a Lady" – 4:39
2. "A Sad Affair" – 4:06
3. "Keep In Your Own Backyard" – 2:58
4. "Ain't Life Something" – 2:54
5. "Don't It Matter Anymore?" – 2:57
6. "Manifesto" – 2:49
7. "Now I've Seen the Light" – 2:16
8. "Apollo 11" – 0:56

=== Side two ===
1. "Our Jackie's Getting Married" – 2:56
2. "Every Home Should Have One" – 3:33
3. "Rock On" – 3:02
4. "Roll On Rhoda" – 2:42
5. "All Last Night" – 2:56
6. "My Lonely Room" – 4:21
7. "Goodnight" – 0:58
8. "Symphonion" – 1:08

=== Bonus tracks on the 2019 remaster ===
17. "I Don't Know" – 2:26
18. "Georgia Moon" – 4:06
19. "Lean Back (And Let It Happen)" – 2:43
20. "Lie Safely There" – 3:58
