= Bel Canto Trio =

The Bel Canto Trio, consisting of tenor Mario Lanza, soprano Frances Yeend and bass-baritone George London, was created by Columbia Artists Management in 1947. The Bel Canto Trio performed 86 concerts throughout the United States, Canada and Mexico between July 1947 and May 1948.
