= The Girl from Nantucket =

Broadway musical

The Girl From Nantucket is a two-act comedy musical with lyrics by Kay Twomey and music by Jacques Belasco. The musical's book, by Paul Stamford, Harold Sherman and Hi Cooper, is based on a story by Fred Thompson and Bernie Giler.

== Productions ==
The show premiered at the Forrest Theatre in Philadelphia in October 1945. It opened on Broadway at the Adelphi Theatre on November 8, 1945 where it closed on November 17 after 12 performances.

The production starred Adelaide Bishop as Betty Ellis, Jane Kean as Dodey Ellis, and Helen Raymond as Keziah Getchel.

== Reception ==
The Girl from Nantucket was negatively reviewed by critics, including the New York Post and Time Magazine.

== Musical numbers ==
=== Act l ===
- I Want to See More of You (Betty Ellis and Michael Nicolson)
- Take the Steamer to Nantucket (Vacationists and Guides)
- What's He Like? (Betty Ellis, Dodey Ellis and Girls)
- What's a Sailor Got? (Captain Matthew Ellis and Ensemble)
- Magnificent Failure* (Dick Oliver)
- Hurray for Nicoletti (Dick Oliver and Ensemble)
- When a Hick Chick Meets a City Slicker (Dodey Ellis and Dick Oliver)
- Your Fatal Fascination (Betty Ellis, Michael Nicolson, Dance Specialists, Ann Ellis and Ensemble)
- Let's Do and Say We Didn't* (Dodey Ellis and Girls)
- Nothing Matters (Mary and Girls)
- Sons of the Sea (Tom Andrews and Fishermen)

=== Act ll ===
- Isn't It a Lovely View? (Betty Ellis and Vacationists)
- Isn't It a Lovely View? (Reprise) (Betty Ellis)
- From Morning Till Night (Betty Ellis and Michael Nicolson)
- I Love That Boy (Dodey Ellis and Dick Oliver)
- From Morning Till Night (Reprise) (Michael Nicolson)
- Hammock in the Blue (Betty Ellis, Michael Nicolson and Ensemble)
- Boukra Fill Mish Mish (Captain Matthew Ellis, Solo Dancer and Ensemble)

*Music and lyrics by Hughie Prince and Dick Rogers

== Cast ==
	1945 Broadway
Betty Ellis	Adelaide Bishop (understudy: Pat McClarney)
Dodey Ellis	Jane Kean
Enrico Nicoletti	Richard Clemens
Keziah Getchel	Helen Raymond
Dick Oliver	Jack Durant
Tom Andrews	George Headley
Michael Nicolson	Bob Kennedy
Captain Matthew Ellis	Billy Lynn
Ann Ellis	Marion Niles
Judge Peleg	John Robb
Cornelius B. Van Winkler	Norman Roland
Caleb	Johnny Eager
Roy	Johnny Eager
Mary	Connie Sheldon
Solo Dancer	Tommy Ladd
Dance Specialists	Kathy Gaynes, Kim Gaynes
Ensemble	James Barton, T.C. Jones, Tom Ladd, Evelyn Wyckoff
