= Peter Skellern =

English singer-songwriter and pianist (1947–2017)

The Reverend Peter Skellern
- Born: 14 March 1947; Bury, Lancashire, England
- Died: 17 February 2017 (aged 69) Lanteglos-by-Fowey, Cornwall, England
- Genres: Easy listening; traditional pop; baroque pop; music hall
- Occupations: Singer; songwriter; actor; priest
- Instruments: Vocals, piano
- Years active: 1969–2017
- Labels: Decca; Mercury; Island; WEA

Peter Skellern (14 March 1947 – 17 February 2017) was an English singer-songwriter and pianist who rose to fame in the 1970s. He had two top twenty hits on the UK Singles Chart – "You're a Lady" (1972), which typifies his signature use of brass bands and choral arrangements for a nostalgic and romantic feel, and "Hold On to Love" (1975). In the 1980s, Skellern formed the band Oasis with Julian Lloyd Webber and Mary Hopkin and established a musical comedy partnership with Richard Stilgoe in cabaret.

Over his career, Skellern wrote and performed music for film, television and stage, notably writing and starring in Happy Endings, a 1981 BBC anthology series of comic musical plays. Skellern's songs have been recorded by Andy Williams, Davy Jones, Brigitte Bardot, Ringo Starr and Jack Jones, amongst others. After developing an inoperable brain tumour, Skellern was ordained as a deacon and priest of the Church of England in October 2016. He died four months later.

== Life and career ==
Peter Skellern was born in Bury, Lancashire, to Margaret (née Spencer) and John Skellern. He attended Derby High School and studied piano at the Guildhall School of Music and Drama. After graduating with honours in 1968, Skellern struggled to make headway in a career as a concert pianist and instead focused on pursuing popular music. Answering a Melody Maker advert, Skellern joined the band the March Hare as keyboardist. This gave the classically-trained musician experience in rock and pop. The March Hare became Harlan County in 1970, but failed to achieve any success and disbanded. Skellern continued to pursue a career in pop, represented by the band's manager, Johnny Stirling. This led to a record deal with Decca for recording and Warner Music for publishing, signed on 5 May 1972.

Skellern's first song to become a hit was "You're a Lady", released on 11 August 1972. The record featured Skellern accompanied by members of the Congregation, who had previously recorded the top ten hit "Softly Whispering I Love You", and the Hanwell Band. "You're a Lady" reached number 3 on the UK Singles Chart and number 50 in the United States Billboard Hot 100. The accompanying album,You're a Lady, and subsequent singles failed to chart. Success for Skellern followed three years later with "Hold On to Love" which reached number 14 on the UK chart. He also sang the theme song to the London Weekend Television series Billy Liar (1973). For three years in the 1970s he worked on BBC Radio 4's Stop the Week. A non-charting song, "Too Much I'm in Love", received radio play.

In 1978, Skellern had a minor hit with the 1930s Ray Noble song "Love Is the Sweetest Thing" (which featured backing by the Grimethorpe Colliery Band), winning the Music Trades Association award for best middle of the road song. This followed his departure from Island Records after his previous album, Hard Times, had failed to chart despite a guest appearance by George Harrison.

In 1981 he wrote, composed and performed in a series of musical playlets for the BBC called Happy Endings. Two years later he hosted the Private Lives television chat show. He wrote the lyrics for the song "One More Kiss, Dear" from the film Blade Runner (1982).

In 1984, Skellern performed the theme song for the London Weekend Television programme Me and My Girl. In the same year, he formed a group called Oasis with cellist Julian Lloyd Webber and Mary Hopkin. The group released a self-titled album in 1984 on the Warner Bros. Records label which earned a silver record. The group performed live on television, but a planned concert tour was cancelled when Hopkin became ill.

In 1987, Skellern wrote and performed the theme music and song for the Yorkshire Television series Flying Lady.

Skellern provided the voice of Carter Brandon in the BBC Radio adaptations of Peter Tinniswood's Uncle Mort's North Country. The show was produced by Pete Atkin.

Skellern collaborated with Richard Stilgoe in cabaret and in musical comedy with comic songs such as "Joyce the Librarian". They released three live albums; A Quiet Night Out, By the Wey and Who Plays Wins.

Toward the end of his career Skellern wrote pieces of sacred choral music, including "Waiting for the Word" (which was written for the BBC's Songs of Praise programme of 19 August 2001), Six Simple Carols and The Nativity Cantata written for a Hemel Hempstead choir, the Aeolian Singers. The work was first performed by them in 2004 and was later recorded.

=== Illness and death ===
In October 2016, it was reported that Skellern had developed an inoperable brain tumour and that he had fulfilled a long-time desire to be ordained in the Church of England. Under a special faculty from the Archbishop of Canterbury, he was ordained both as a deacon and priest on 16 October 2016 by the Bishop of Truro.

Skellern died on 17 February 2017, at the age of 69, in Lanteglos-by-Fowey, Cornwall.

On 17 April 2017, Sir Tim Rice presented an hour-long tribute for Skellern on BBC Radio 2.

== Cover versions ==
In 1972, the same year that "You're a Lady" was released, the song was covered in France by folk singer Hugues Aufray under the title "Vous ma lady", followed later in the year by Brigitte Bardot with Laurent Vergez in a duet version released on 3 January 1973. Davy Jones from the Monkees also recorded a version. In the US charts, Skellern's release on Bell Records competed with a version by Dawn which was released around the same time. The song has been extensively covered since, by artists such as Johnny Mathis on his 1973 album Me and Mrs. Jones and Telly Savalas on his 1974 album Telly.

Skellern's other songs have been also recorded by a number of other singers, such as Andy Williams who included "Make It Easy for Me" on his 1973 album Solitaire and "My Lonely Room" on his 1975 album Andy. Ringo Starr recorded Skellern's "Hard Times" on his 1978 album Bad Boy.

On her 1985 eponymous BBC television comedy series, Victoria Wood performed an affectionate parody of Skellern's musical style, accompanied by a brass band and choir, in a song entitled "Skellern in Love", also known as "Northern Boy".

== Crowdfunded CD releases ==
Since 2019, fans have crowdfunded CD reissues of Skellern's back catalogue. Two sets have since been released by Mint Audio, The Complete Decca Recordings (2019) and The Complete Island and Mercury Recordings (2021). These sets feature all of Skellern's albums and singles from 1972 to 1982, except for the Happy Endings album which was released by the BBC. In February 2024, another crowdfunding campaign was launched on Kickstarter to release on CD for the time.

== Discography ==
=== Albums ===
sources:

- You're a Lady, 1972
- Not Without a Friend, 1974
- Holding My Own, 1974
- Hold On to Love, 1975
- Hard Times, 1975
- Kissing in the Cactus, 1977
- Skellern, 1978 – UK No.48
- Astaire, 1979 – UK No. 23
- Still Magic, 1980
- Captain Beaky and His Band (contribution to Vol. II), 1980
- Happy Endings, 1981
- A String of Pearls, 1982 – UK No. 67
- Ain't Life Something, 1984
- Oasis, 1984
- Who Plays Wins with Richard Stilgoe, 1985
- Lovelight, 1987
- Cheek to Cheek, 1993
- Stardust Memories (a tribute to Bill Kenny and the Ink Spots), 1995 – UK No. 50
- Sentimentally Yours, 1996
- The Very Best of Peter Skellern, 1996
- By the Wey with Richard Stilgoe, 1997
- A Quiet Night Out with Richard Stilgoe, 2000
- You're a Lady: The Best of Peter Skellern, Spectrum 2014
- The Complete Decca Recordings, Mint Audio 2019
- The Complete Island and Mercury Recordings, Mint Audio 2021

=== Singles ===
- "You're a Lady", 1972 – UK No. 3, IRL No.7, US No. 50, AUS No. 2
- "Our Jackie's Getting Married", 1972
- "Hold On to Love", 1975 – UK No. 14, US No. 106
- "Hard Times", 1975
- "Love Is the Sweetest Thing", 1978 – UK No. 60

== Recordings of choral music ==
- "So Said the Angel" on the CD Noel! (Priory PRCD 768) sung by the Bach Choir of London, 2001
- The Nativity Cantata and Other Christmas Music, performed by the Aeolian Singers, 2005
- "So Said the Angel" on the album A Cotswold Christmas performed by the Abbey School Choir, Tewkesbury, 2006
