= H-E Double Hockey Sticks =

1999 television film by Randall Miller

- Based on: Griffelkin by Lukas Foss; Alastair Reid
- Teleplay by: David Kukof; Matt Roshkow
- Directed by: Randall Miller
- Starring: Will Friedle; Matthew Lawrence; Gabrielle Union; Shawn Pyfrom; Tara Spencer-Nairn; Kim Greist; Rhea Perlman
- Music by: Julian Nott
- Country of origin: United States
- Original language: English

Production
- Producers: Jeffrey Lampert; George Zaloom
- Cinematography: Mike Ozier
- Editor: Jonathan Siegel
- Running time: 96 minutes
- Production company: Big W Productions

Original release
- Network: ABC
- Release: October 3, 1999

H.E. Double Hockey Sticks is a 1999 American made-for-television comedy film directed by Randall Miller starring Will Friedle and Matthew Lawrence. The film is based on the opera Griffelkin by Lukas Foss. The film's title is a common euphemism for the word hell. The film premiered on October 3, 1999, as a part of The Wonderful World of Disney anthology series on ABC.

== Plot ==
Satan, in the form of Ms. Beelzebub (Rhea Perlman), sends apprentice demon Griffelkin (Friedle) to Earth's surface to steal the soul of a hotshot young hockey player named Dave Heinrich (Lawrence), who aspires to be the youngest man to ever win the Stanley Cup.

Dave and Griffelkin sign a contract whereby Dave's soul is forfeit in exchange for a Stanley Cup championship for the Delaware Demons (a thinly veiled version of the New Jersey Devils), which is Dave's team at the time. After the deal is done, Dave is traded to The Annapolis Angels, the last-place team in the league, creating a loophole in the bargain whereby the Devils can can win the Stanley Cup without Dave. Griffelkin chooses to help Dave after spending time with him, his girlfriend, and his girlfriend's younger brother. An angel named Gabrielle tells Griffelkin that Dave's soul can be saved if the Angels win the Stanley Cup. Dave slowly learns that the only way to save his soul is to become a true team player and help his new teammates improve enough to defeat the Demons in the Stanley Cup finals. In the final match, the Demons lose the Stanley Cup, the Angels win, and the deal is off. Ms. Beelzebub, enraged at her defeat and at Griffelkin for helping Dave win, madly goes back to Hell in a fit of rage. Griffelkin decides to join Gabrielle, giving up his position as a demon to become an angel.

== Main cast ==
- Will Friedle as Griffelkin
- Matthew Lawrence as Dave Heinrich
- Gabrielle Union as Gabrielle/Gabby
- Rhea Perlman as Satan/Ms. Beelzebub (Ms. B)
- Shawn Pyfrom as Lewis
- Tara Spencer-Nairn as Anne
- Kim Greist as Marie Antoinette
- Brad Nessler as himself
- Kevin McNulty as Annapolis Angels Coach
- Colin Murdock as Delaware Demons Announcer
- Kett Turton as Skid
- Tyler Labine as Mark

== See also ==
- List of films about ice hockey
