= Mildred Allen (soprano) =

American operatic soprano (1929–2021)

- Born: October 26, 1929; Akron, Ohio
- Died: May 15, 2021; Shelby County, Alabama
- Occupations: operatic soprano, voice teacher

Mildred Allen (born Mildred Ann Reynolds, October 26, 1929 – May 15, 2021) was an American operatic soprano who had an active career during the 1950s and 1960s. She notably was a regular performer at the Metropolitan Opera between 1957 and 1962. She later became a member of the voice faculty at Birmingham–Southern College where she taught from 1987–2009.

== Biography ==
=== Early life ===
The daughter of Herman C. and Mary Reynolds, Mildred Ann Reynolds was born in Akron, Ohio on October 26, 1929. She spent her early childhood living on a farm in Lewisburg, Tennessee. By 1940 the Reynolds family was living in a home in Memphis, Tennessee at 625 Greenwood Ave. In Memphis she studied piano and singing with Lois C. Trezevant. As a young teenager she performed in concerts in Memphis with the Allegro Society. She attended Bellevue Junior High and Memphis's Central High School. By 1945 the Reynolds family had moved to Jackson, Mississippi and were living at a home on Sollitt Ave.

Mildred attended Central High School in Jackson where she was a member of the school's choir. She was also a member of the choir at Galloway Memorial United Methodist Church in Jackson, and was a soloist in that church's May 1946 presentation of Felix Mendelssohn's Elijah. By September 1946 the Reynolds family had relocated to Gulfport, Mississippi. Mildred attended Gulfport High School (GHS) where she studied under vocal music teacher J. Stanley Arnold. She sang in the chorus at Gulfport First United Methodist Church while in high school. She graduated from GHS in 1947 and was one of two commencement speakers selected from among the graduating class at the graduation ceremony.

=== Education ===
Allen began her college education at Gulf Park College for Women in the 1947-1948 academic year. In the 1948-1949 academic year she attended Southern Methodist University on a music scholarship. She was awarded another scholarship to attend SMU for the 1949-1950 academic year (her junior year). However her marriage in the summer of 1949 led her to transfer to the University of Mississippi (UM) in February 1950. Her first husband was a medical school at UM at that time. At UM she studied singing with Isaac Reid. She starred as Lucy in UM's 1951 production of Menotti's The Telephone. She graduated from UM with a B.A. of Music in 1951.

Allen pursued graduate studies at the New England Conservatory (NEC) in Boston where she studied voice with tenor Frederick Jagel. While a student there she concurrently worked as a secretary in the pathology department of Peter Bent Brigham Hospital. In 1952 she was a soloist in NEC's performance of Arthur Honegger's Le Roi David given at Jordan Hall, and performed excerpts from La bohème and Carmen staged by impresario and conductor Boris Goldovsky at Brown Hall as part of NEC's opera theatre program. She earned a master's degree in Vocal Performance from NEC; graduating in 1953. She studied for a brief period under scholarship at the Academy of Vocal Arts in Philadelphia, but left to go to New York City. There she continued to study singing privately with Leopold Sachse.

=== Early career ===
In 1952 Allan made her professional debut with Goldovsky's New England Opera Theater (NEOT) as Cis in Britten's Albert Herring with Phyllis Curtin as Lady Billows and David Lloyd in the title role. In 1953 she was the soprano soloist in Haydn's The Creation under conductor George Poinar at the Plymouth Rock Center of Music and Drama (PRCMD). She also performed in operas at the PRCMD that year; including performing the roles of Micaela in Bizet's Carmen and Norina in Don Pasquale (with Robert Mesrobian in the title role). In 1955 she performed the role of Ascanius in Les Troyens with the NEOT. This was the first time that opera was performed in the United States.

On August 6, 1956 Allen portrayed the title role in the first staged production of Lukas Foss's Griffelkin at the Tanglewood Music Festival. In the autumn of 1956 she toured with the NBC Opera Company as Susanna in The Marriage of Figaro and Cio-Cio-San in Madama Butterfly.

=== Metropolitan Opera ===
Allen joined the roster of sopranos at the Metropolitan Opera in 1957. She initially was hired to replace Roberta Peters, who was out having a baby, as Papagena in Mozart's The Magic Flute in March 1957. Rudolf Bing was pleased with her performance and she was offered a long-term contract with the company . She sang regularly at the Met for the next 5 years for a total of 208 performances. Her more notable roles at the Met included Amore in Gluck's Orfeo ed Euridice, Giannetta in Donizetti's L'elisir d'amore, Guadalena in Offenbach's La Périchole, Micaela in Bizet's Carmen, Oscar in Verdi's Un ballo in maschera, Yniold in Debussy's Pelléas et Mélisande, and Zerlina in Mozart's Don Giovanni. She also portrayed a number of smaller supporting roles, including Annina in La Traviata to the Violettas of Licia Albanese, Maria Callas, and Victoria de los Angeles and the role of Ines in Il Trovatore to Lucine Amara's Leonora . Her last performance at the Met was on April 2, 1962 as the Crowned Child in Verdi's Macbeth with Anselmo Colzani in the title role and Irene Dalis as Lady Macbeth.

During her years at the Met, Allen also occasionally sang roles with other companies. She toured North America with the NBC Opera Theatre singing Barbarina in Le nozze di Figaro with Phyllis Curtin as the Countess and Walter Cassel as the Count. In 1957 she made her debut with the Santa Fe Opera (SFO) as Cio-Cio-San in Madama Butterfly with Regina Sarfaty as Suzuki and Loren Driscoll as Pinkerton. She made several more appearances with the SFO over the next ten years, including portraying Isabella Linton in the world premiere of Carlisle Floyd's Wuthering Heights in 1958. Her other roles at the SFO included, Mimi in La bohème (1958, 1967), Despina in Così fan tutte (1958), Nannetta in Falstaff (1958), Adele in Die Fledermaus (1959), Cio-Cio-San (1959, 1963, 1965), Alexandra Giddens in Marc Blitzstein's Regina (1959), Susanna in Le nozze di Figaro (1960, 1965), Anne in The Rake's Progress (1960), Zerlina (1963), La Chauve-Sourris in L'Enfant et les sortileges (1963), St. Margaret in Arthur Honegger's Joan of Arc at the Stake (1963), and Costanza in Hans Henze's The Stag King (1965). Her final role with the company was in 1967 as Micaela in Bizet's Carmen.

=== Washington Opera ===
After leaving the Met in 1962, Allen became a regular performer at the Washington National Opera during the 1960s. She made her debut with the company in 1962 singing Violetta in La Traviata opposite Stanley Kolk as Alfredo. Her other roles with the company included Adele in Die Fledermaus and Cio-Cio San. She also sang a number of leading roles with the Central City Opera and with a few opera houses in Europe, including the role of Amore at the Liceu.

=== As a teacher ===
From 1987–2009 she was a member of the voice faculty at Birmingham–Southern College where she taught voice, directed student opera productions, and taught a variety of subjects that encompassed art and literature in addition to music. When she retired, she still taught privately out of her home in Birmingham, Alabama.

=== Personal life and death ===
In 1949 Allen married her first husband, Marshall Bonner Allen, Jr. (1927-2015) Marshall had a distinguished career as a neurosurgeon; becoming the chief of neurosurgery at the Medical College of Georgia. Mildred was still married to Marshall as late as 1955, but by October 1957 the marriage had ended and Marshall was remarried to his second wife, Dorothy Herron. Mildred's second marriage was to Edward Taub, a neuroscientist at the University of Alabama at Birmingham. They married in New Mexico in 1959; a marriage which lasted for the remainder of her life.

Allen died in Shelby County, Alabama on May 15, 2021.
