= Hard Times (Peter Skellern album) =

Studio album by Peter Skellern
- Released: 1975
- Genre: Pop
- Label: Island
- Producer: Meyer Shagaloff

Peter Skellern chronology
Hold On to Love (1975)	Hard Times (1975)	Kissing in the Cactus (1977)

Hard Times is the fifth album by singer, songwriter and pianist Peter Skellern (1947–2017)) released in 1975 on the Island Records label. Despite much radio airplay, "Hard Times" failed as a single and the LP slipped into decades of obscurity. As a result of this commercial failure, Skellern changed record companies again, signing with Phonogram under their Mercury subsidiary and immediately enjoying a minor hit with a cover of "Love Is the Sweetest Thing". This album has now been officially re-issued on CD by Mint Audio Records on the 3 cd set, The Complete Island & Mercury Recordings.

== Track listing ==
All tracks written by Peter Skellern except "Make Love, Not War" written by John Burrows, John Harding and Peter Skellern.

Side 1

1. "Hard Times”
2. "I Guess You Wish You’d Gone Home"
3. "Baby What a Fool I’ve Been”
4. "Down in the Cellar"
5. ”Goodbye, America Keep You Well”

Side 2

1. "Snake Bite"
2. "Make Love, Not War” (From the musical revue Loud Reports)
3. "A Capella”
4. "Let’s Sleep Late"
5. "And Then You’ll Fall"

== Personnel ==
- Peter Skellern - vocals, acoustic and electric piano, percussion, organ and Moog
- Rob Townsend - drums
- George Ford - bass guitar
- Mick Green, Brian Alterman - guitar
- Chris Karan - tablas
- Andrew Price Jackman - string arrangements
- Madeline Bell, Joy Yates, Joanne Williams - backing vocals
- George Harrison - guitar on "Make Love Not War"

== Production ==
- Producer: Meyer Shagaloff by arrangement with Johnny Stirling for Pendulum Music Ltd
- Engineer: Trevor Vallis
- Tape operators: Dave & Vaughan
- Recorded at: Mayfair Sound Studios
- Cover illustration: Tony Wright
- Album design: Eckford Stimpson
