= Hold On to Love (Peter Skellern song) =

Single by Peter Skellern

from the album Hold On To Love
- B-side: "Too Much, I'm In Love"
- Released: 1975
- Genre: Pop
- Length: 2:54
- Label: Decca Records
- Songwriter(s): Peter Skellern
- Producer(s): Meyer Shagaloff

"Hold On to Love" is a 1975 single by British singer-songwriter Peter Skellern. It reached number 14 in the UK Singles Chart on 29 March 1975, becoming Skellern's second and final top 20 hit, following his debut single "You're a Lady", which made number 3 in 1972. Skellern described the song as a personal love song like his previous hit, but the song possesses more of a rock backing. The song has been praised by the British musician and journalist Bob Stanley, who highlighted its "spacious, squelchy production" and described it as "maybe my favourite single of 1975". The single's B-side was "Too Much, I'm In Love", which received considerable radio play in the years to follow.
