= George London (bass-baritone) =

Opera singer from Canada

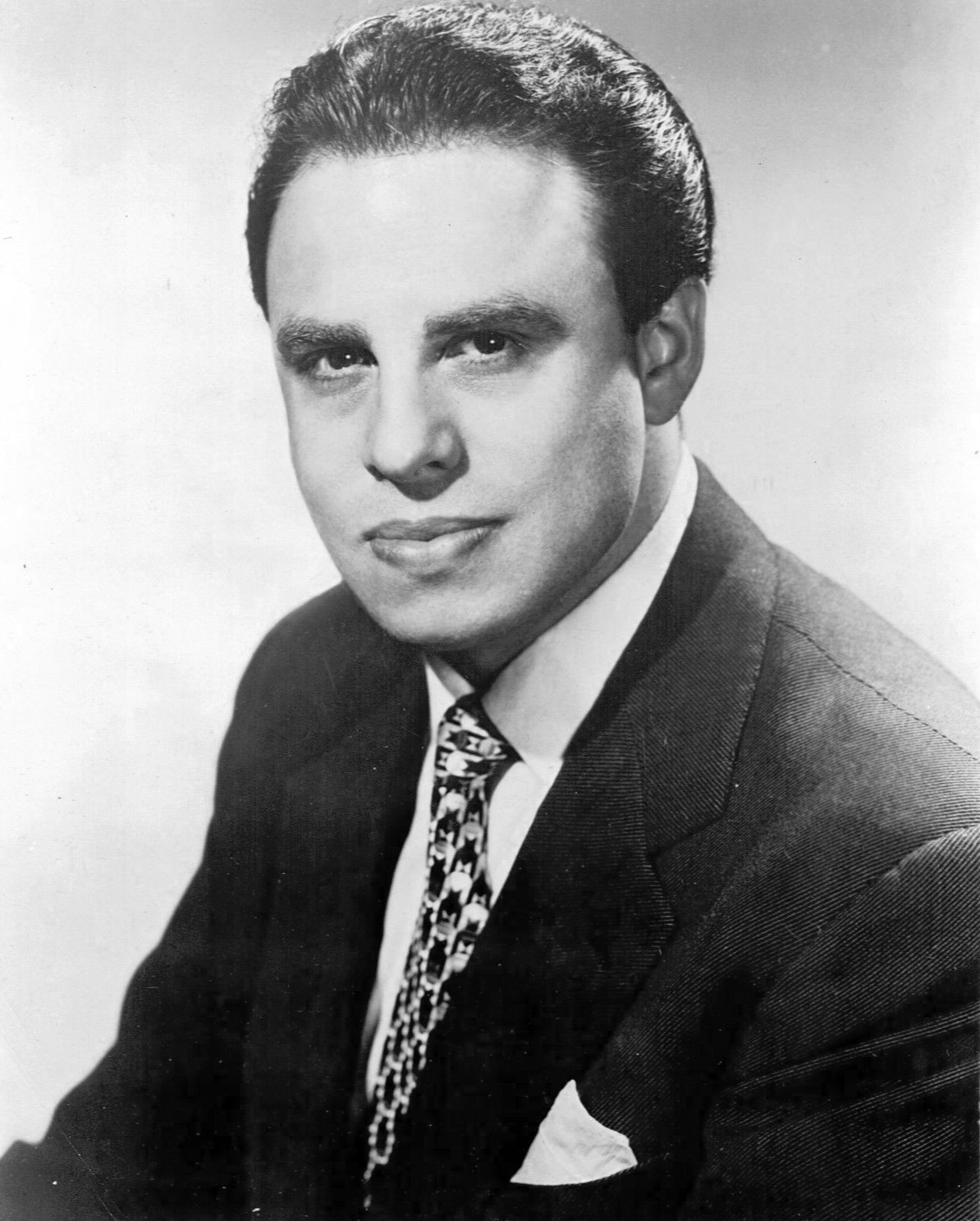
London in 1953

George London (born George Burnstein; May 30, 1920 – March 24, 1985) was an American concert and operatic bass-baritone. After his singing career was ended by partial vocal paralysis, he became an opera director and established the George London Foundation for Singers.

== Biography ==
George Burnstein was born to U.S. naturalized parents of Russian origin in Montreal, Quebec, Canada, and grew up in Los Angeles, California. He studied singing with Allan Rogers Lindquest. His operatic debut was in 1941 as George Burnson, singing Dr Grenvil in La traviata at the Hollywood Bowl. In the summer of 1945 Antal Doráti invited his longtime friend, the Hungarian bass Mihály Székely, to sing at the first concert of the newly reorganized Dallas Symphony Orchestra. Due to travel difficulties, Székely was unable to arrive in time, so Doráti called upon young George London as a substitute.

After performing widely with tenor Mario Lanza and soprano Frances Yeend as part of the Bel Canto Trio in 1947–48, London was engaged by the Vienna State Opera, where he scored his first major success in 1949. In 1950, he sang the role of Pater Profundis in Mahler's Eighth Symphony, conducted by Leopold Stokowski, with Carlos Alexander and Eugene Conley among the other soloists.

He was among the most famous exponents of his five signature roles: Don Giovanni, Boris Godunov, Wotan, Scarpia and Amfortas. He never recorded any role in Die Meistersinger von Nürnberg, although recital performances of Hans Sachs' monologues exist on record.

In 1951 he sang at the Bayreuth Festival as Amfortas in Parsifal, and reappeared frequently in the 1950s and early 1960s as Amfortas and in the title role of The Flying Dutchman. He made his debut with the Metropolitan Opera in 1951 as Amonasro in Aida, and sang over 270 performances, both baritone and bass roles, such as Figaro and Count Almaviva in The Marriage of Figaro, The Speaker in The Magic Flute, Mandryka in Arabella, Scarpia in Tosca, the title role in Don Giovanni, Boris in Boris Godunov, Escamillo in Carmen, Iago in Otello, Amfortas in Parsifal, Wolfram in Tannhäuser, the four villains in The Tales of Hoffmann, Golaud in Pelléas et Mélisande, and Mephistopheles in Faust.

In 1964, he created the role of Abdul in the American premiere of Gian Carlo Menotti's The Last Savage. He was the first North American to sing the title role of Boris Godunov at the Bolshoi Theatre in Moscow, at the height of the Cold War in 1960.

He frequently performed in English: Broadway show tunes and negro spirituals. He recorded many of his roles for RCA Victor, Columbia Records, and Decca. He recorded Verdi's Requiem with Richard Tucker and Lucine Amara, under Eugene Ormandy. He also recorded Puccini's Tosca with Mario Del Monaco and Renata Tebaldi under Francesco Molinari-Pradelli conducting the Orchestra dell'Accademia Nazionale di Santa Cecilia. A recording of a live concert with piano accompaniment is also available from VAI, which includes Mussorgsky's Songs and Dances of Death, as well as several Schubert Lieder and a variety of songs in English.

During his Met career, in 1956, he appeared on Ed Sullivan's television program in an abridged version of act 2 of Tosca, opposite Maria Callas, conducted by Dimitri Mitropoulos. A kinescope of that performance was preserved. Another black-and-white videotape of him in the same role, opposite Renata Tebaldi in a complete performance, is sometimes available. In 1958, London performed the leading role of Wotan, in the groundbreaking recording of Richard Wagner's opera Das Rheingold, conducted by Georg Solti, and produced by John Culshaw for Decca.

Having already sung the Rheingold Wotan and the Siegfried Wanderer roles at the Met in New York in December 1961 and January 1962, he was ready to sing his first complete Ring Cycle. This was to be the now legendary new production mounted by Wieland Wagner at the Cologne Opera in West Germany in May 1962. Wieland Wagner was ready to try out new singers and production ideas in advance of his new Bayreuth Festival production which was scheduled for the summer of 1965 with London as Wotan and the Wanderer.

The Cologne Ring proved to be a great success (a private recording of Das Rheingold from this cycle exists to verify this) but London's vocal health began to deteriorate rapidly during the 1963/64 season; subsequently the problem was diagnosed as a paralysed vocal cord. This problem increased so much that shortly after singing Wotan in Die Walküre at the Met in March 1965, he canceled his upcoming appearances at the Bayreuth Festival to rest and ideally recover his voice.

However, his vocal decline continued so severely that by March 1966, he performed his last appearance at the Metropolitan Opera: the role of Amfortas in Parsifal. London subsequently received injections of Teflon in his paralyzed vocal cord – then the state-of-the-art treatment for this condition – which filled it out and therefore restored his voice to some extent. But he decided the improvement did not let him achieve again his self-imposed highest standards. He therefore ended his singing career in 1967, at 46.

== George London Foundation ==
In 1971, London established the George London Foundation for Singers, which gives grants to young opera singers early in their careers. $80,000 is given each year to the winners of an annual competition.

== Directing ==
In 1975, he directed the first Ring Cycle produced by Seattle Opera, creating its "Pacific Northwest Wagner Festival". From 1975 until 1977 he was general director of the Washington Opera.

== Vocal signature ==
His voice was large, dark and resonant with a massive, penetrating top. Although it was also rather thickly-textured, London at his best commanded a wide range of dynamics, from delicate pianississimi to resounding fortes. His musicianship won him acclaim on three continents.

London's talent was celebrated twice before his death. In the Carnegie Hall concert of 1981, introduced by Beverly Sills, performances were given by a long list of colleagues. In Vienna, 1984, some of the world's greatest singers assembled to honor the artist.

== Health issues and death ==
In the 1960s, his voice began to deteriorate and partial vocal paralysis was diagnosed. He took injections of silicone and teflon, but did not improve. In 1977, a massive heart attack left him half paralyzed, with brain damage. After that, his health inexorably declined. A few years later, he managed to survive a second heart attack. On March 24, 1985, he died in Armonk, New York, after a third heart attack. He was 64 years old.

== Bibliography ==
- London, Nora. "ARIA FOR GEORGE"'. Fort Worth: Baskerville, 2005; ISBN 1-880909-74-X
