= Aeolian Singers =

British choir

The Aeolian Singers are a British mixed-voice choir based in the town of Hemel Hempstead, Hertfordshire. Established in 1963, they have about 80 members.

As well as concerts in Hemel Hempstead, the singers also perform in major London concert halls and in other parts of Europe. In recent years they have performed in Ghent, Paris and Provence and visited Mannheim in October 2006, where they performed in two concerts together with the Konzertchor der Stadt Mannheim. They have a very wide repertoire ranging from Renaissance to contemporary music, and have given several first performances. They also have a tradition of community and youth involvement. In recent years the Aeolian Singers have performed the music of William Lloyd Webber.

The musical director of the chorus is Stephen Jones. Until his death in 2017, the president of the Aeolian Singers was Peter Skellern.

== Recordings ==
- The Nativity Cantata and other Christmas Music by Peter Skellern performed by the Aeolian Singers — 2005
