= Our Jackie's Getting Married =

Single by Peter Skellern

from the album You're a Lady
- B-side: "I Don't Know"
- Released: 24 November 1972
- Genre: Pop, music hall
- Length: 2:56
- Label: Decca Records
- Songwriter(s): Peter Skellern
- Producer(s): Peter Sames

Peter Skellern singles chronology
"You're a Lady" (1972)	"Our Jackie's Getting Married" (1972)	"Roll Away" (1973)

"Our Jackie's Getting Married" is a 1972 song by British singer-songwriter Peter Skellern. It was released by Decca Records as Skellern's second single in late 1972, following the chart success of his first, "You're a Lady", but failed to chart.

The song's lyrics are written from the perspective of the titular Jackie, addressing his lover and telling her of the commotion he anticipates there will be when he tells his family about his plans to marry her. One verse has Jackie mimicking his mother's excited reaction to the news. Musically, the song incorporates an off-key piano and a brass band, which Skellern said nostalgically reminded him of a Northern wedding. Towards the end, a brief excerpt from Mendelssohn's Wedding March played on the Guildford Cathedral organ momentarily interrupts all other instrumentation. Another feature is a 'wound-up choir', a favourite studio effect of Skellern's. This effect was achieved by recording the choir at a slower speed making it sound higher and faster on normal speed playback.

Upon release, the song received praise from Deborah Thomas of the Daily Mirror, who commented "Peter Skellern is bound to plinkety plonk up the pop charts with an every day tale about ordinary folk" and from Charles Fiske of the Newcastle Evening Chronicle who said "it should help establish Peter as a new songwriter of considerable ability and talent". Bob Stanton of Coventry Evening Telegraph considered it "a pleasant enough, jog-along number" that was "nowhere near as distinctive or original" as "You're a Lady".

Skellern worried that fans wouldn't like "Our Jackie's Getting Married" as much as "You're a Lady" due to its difference in style. According to Skellern, Decca "wanted "You're a Lady" again and again. I didn't want to do it again because it was a very special song. I didn't want to spend my life doing "You're a Lady" copies." Released on 24 November 1972, the single failed to chart. Skellern would later say the single was issued due to pressure from higher authorities. He told Charles Webster of Record Mirror "I didn't really want it released. We were going to do another song but the mixing went wrong so Jackie was put out as a sort of stop gap by the record company". In Australia and New Zealand, the song was released as the B-side to "All Last Night".

Despite its commercial failure, the song was a runner-up in 1973's Ivor Novello Awards for Best Novelty Song. Skellern had mixed feelings about this, telling Record Mirror "I felt like getting under the table when they announced the prizes and said that the Novelty Song section had been won by such people as the Singing Postman in previous years! The thing is, mine wasn't a novelty record".
