= Washington Open =

The term most commonly refers to:

- Washington Open (golf) – an annual golf tournament held since 1922 at various locations in the state of Washington
- Washington Open (tennis) – a Washington D.C. tennis tournament held each year since 1969

Other uses include:

- Washington Open DanceSport Competition – ballroom dancing competition held in Virginia.
- Washington Open Chess Championship – a chess event held in Virginia from 2000–present.

== See also ==
- Greater Washington Open
