= She Had to Go and Lose It at the Astor =

1939 comic song

"She Had to Go and Lose It at the Astor" is a 1939 comic song by Don Raye and Hughie Prince and was recorded by Dick Robertson, Pearl Bailey and the British bandleader and clarinetist Harry Roy. The original recording credits the writing and arrangement to John Doe and Joe Doaques (obvious pseudonyms). The song was recorded on 3 April 1940 by Harry Roy and his Mayfair Hotel Orchestra. It was banned by the BBC in the same year, and censured by the American Society of Composers, Authors and Publishers in 1940.

The song begins with a spoken introduction and tells a story about a young woman losing something at the Hotel Astor. By use of double entendre and the repeated refrain, "But she had to go and lose it at the Astor," the listener is led to believe that the song is about her losing her virginity to one of the hotel staff until the very end when it is revealed that what she had in fact lost was her sable cape.
