= You're a Lady =

Single by Peter Skellern

from the album You're a Lady
- B-side: "Manifesto"
- Released: 11 August 1972
- Recorded: 1972
- Length: 4:39
- Label: Decca
- Songwriter: Peter Skellern
- Producer: Peter Sames

Peter Skellern singles chronology
"You're a Lady" (1972)	"Our Jackie's Getting Married" (1972)

Music video
- "You're a Lady" at TopPop on YouTube

"You're a Lady" is the debut single by British singer-songwriter Peter Skellern. The song became Skellern's first and biggest hit, reaching #3 on the UK Singles Chart, #7 on the Irish Singles Chart and #50 on the U.S. Billboard Hot 100.

Skellern performed the song live on many occasions prior to his retirement in 2001. It became a constant feature of his double act with Richard Stilgoe, and renditions of the song feature on their albums Who Plays Wins (1985) and A Quiet Night Out (2000).

== Background ==
Skellern wrote "You're a Lady" in the summerhouse at his home in Shaftesbury, Dorset. He kept his piano there so as not to bother anyone with his practice. The song has been described as "a breathless love song". Skellern's vocals and piano accompaniment are supplemented by the Congregation, a choral pop ensemble who had already had their own top ten UK hit with "Softly Whispering I Love You", and by the Hanwell Band, heard unaccompanied in the introductory bars.

Skellern once played with the National Youth Brass Band of Great Britain as a child, and he sought to recapture his "speechless amazement" at their sound by using the brass band on the record. The euphonium, played by John Luckett, is prominently featured. Skellern wanted the song to evoke the North of England, saying: "I wanted people to see the wet cobblestones and the Lowry paintings when they heard 'You're a Lady'".

The single was placed on Radio Luxembourg on a pay-for-play basis, but was then picked up by Terry Wogan on his BBC Radio 2 programme. The single went on to sell over 800,000 copies and the song was also the first track on Skellern's 1972 album of the same name. The song's great success and the demands that came with it led Skellern to a six-month period, a couple of years later, where he "got drunk every day".

== Charts ==
=== Weekly charts ===
Chart (1972/73)	Peak position
Australia (Kent Music Report)	2
Irish Singles Chart	7
New Zealand(Listener)	3
United Kingdom (Official Charts Company)	3
US Billboard Hot 100	50

=== Year-end charts ===
Chart (1972)	Position
UK	54
