= Hanwell Band =

Historic brass band

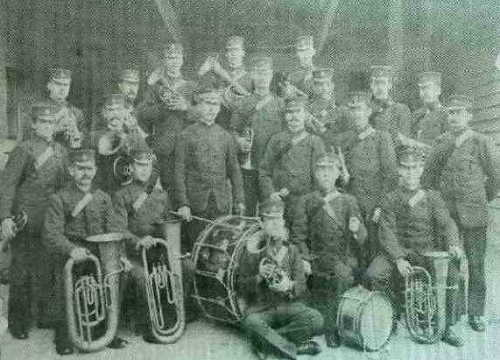
The Hanwell Band in 1903

The Hanwell Band was a brass band formed in Hanwell, near Ealing in the UK, in 1891. It was first known as the Hanwell Town Band but after success in competition it was renamed the Hanwell Prize Band. Another competition win in 1913 in Tottenham expanded the name to the Hanwell Silver Prize Band. In 1979, sponsorship by Roneo Vickers resulted in another name change to the Roneo Vickers Band but the company soon folded. In 1983 the name reverted to The Hanwell Band but the band did not long survive the loss of sponsorship.

== Recordings ==
- The band played on Peter Skellern's 1973 hit You're a Lady
- The Floral Dance (1978) – a chart success with Terry Wogan as the vocalist
- The theme tune to the BBC television series That's Life!
