= Stanley Hollingsworth =

American classical composer

Stanley Walker Hollingsworth (August 27, 1924, Berkeley, California – October 29, 2003, Rocklin, California) was an American composer and teacher. He was a student of composer Darius Milhaud from 1944–46, and of Gian Carlo Menotti from 1948–50. As a composer he is probably best known for his operatic trilogy of children's stories: "The Mother", "The Selfish Giant", and "Harrison Loved his Umbrella".

== Life and career ==
Hollingsworth was conversant in all the vocal and instrumental forms, examples of which are his "Five Songs" (1960) for solo voice and piano, "Death Be Not Proud" (1978) for mixed chorus and piano or orchestra, Sonata for Oboe (1949), and his Concerto for Piano (1980). A notable success was achieved with his opera "La Grande Breteche" when it was commissioned for broadcast by the NBC Opera Theatre in 1957. Hollingsworth was also honored with the Rome Prize (1958), the Guggenheim Fellowship (1958), and residencies at the Montalvo Center for the Arts, the MacDowell Colony, the Yaddo Arts Colony, Wolf Trap, and the Ossaba Island Project. He received commissions from the Curtis Institute, Fedora Horowitz, Meadowbrook Music festival, and the National Endowment for the Arts.

He taught composition and orchestration at the Curtis Institute of Music as an assistant to Gian Carlo Menotti from 1949–1955, was a lecturer at San Jose State College (now San Jose State University) on composition, harmony, counterpoint and piano 1961–63. From 1963 to 1970 he composed and orchestrated for the Harkness Ballet, followed by acting as an operatic and stage director in Austria and Turkey from 1970–72. Hollingsworth was also composer-in-residence at the American Academy in Rome.

His teaching and composing career from 1976 to 1993 was centered at Oakland University, where he was composer-in-residence and finally retired as Professor Emeritus. He was much appreciated and loved by his students, from whom he required an appreciation and practical mastery of counterpoint and orchestration, as exemplified in the following quote: "Inspiration is fine, but when you get stuck you must have craft." Among composers who were his students from that time period may be counted Harold Boatrite, Mark Gottlieb, and Daniel Jencka. His works are housed in the Edwin Fleisher Collection of Orchestral Music at the Free Library of Philadelphia, and at Oakland University.

He was a National Patron of Delta Omicron, an international professional music fraternity.

== Selection of works ==
=== Stage ===
"The Mother" (1949), a one-act opera with libretto by the composer and John Fandel, after Hans Christian Andersen. (Often performed as a trilogy with "The Selfish Giant" and "Harrison Loved His Umbrella")

"La Grande Bretèche" (1954), a one-act opera with libretto by the composer and Harry Duncan, after Honoré de Balzac

"The Unquiet Graves" (1958), a one-act ballet with choreography by John Butler

"The Selfish Giant" (1981), a one-act opera with libretto by the composer, after Oscar Wilde

"Harrison Loved His Umbrella" (1981), a one-act opera/musical cartoon with libretto by the composer and Rhoda Levine.

=== Orchestral ===
"I Saltimbanchi" (1960) for flute, oboe, clarinet, harp and string orchestra, (version of chamber work)

Concerto for piano and orchestra, (1980)

"Divertimento" (1982)

"Three Ladies beside the Sea" (1984) for speaker and small orchestra (text by Rhoda Levine)

"Concerto Lirico" (1991) for violin and orchestra.

=== Chamber music ===
Sonata for oboe and piano (1949)

"I Saltimbanchi" (1960) for flute, oboe, clarinet, harp, string quartet and double bass (also version with string orchestra instead of 5 strings)

"Three Impromptus" (1974) for flute and piano

"Ricordanza" (in memoriam for Samuel Barber) (1981) for oboe, violin, viola and cello

"Academic Festival Procession" (1984) for two French horns, three trumpets, two trombones, tuba and timpani

"Reflections and Diversions" (1985) for clarinet, piano.

=== Choral ===
"Dumbarton Oaks Mass" (1953) for mixed chorus and string orchestra/orchestra

"Stabat Mater" (1957) for mixed chorus, orchestra

"A Song of David" (text from the Book of Psalms) (c. 1960s) for tenor, mixed chorus and orchestra

"Death Be Not Proud" (text by John Donne) (1978) for mixed chorus and piano (also version for mixed chorus, orchestra, c. 1980)

=== Vocal ===
"Five Songs" (1960) (text by Emily Dickinson) for voice and piano (also versions for voice, harp, string quartet, double bass and for voice, harp, string orchestra, 1960)

=== Piano ===
"Five Fancies in Six Minutes" (2000) (unfinished)
