= Frances Yeend =

American opera singer

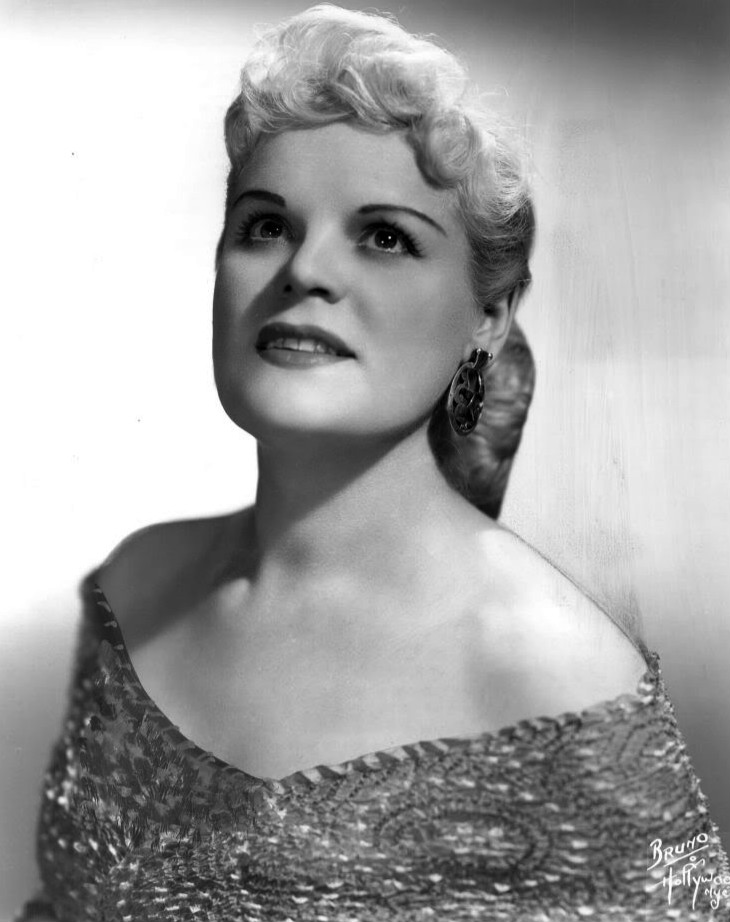
Yeend in 1960.

Frances Yeend (/jɛnd/; 28 January 1913 – 27 April 2008) was an American classical soprano who had an active international career as a concert and opera singer during the 1940s through the 1960s. She had a long and fruitful association with the New York City Opera (NYCO) between 1948 and 1958, after which she joined the roster of principal sopranos at the Metropolitan Opera where she sang between 1961 and 1963. She also had an extensive concert career, particularly in the United States. By 1963 she had sung in more than 200 orchestral concerts in North American with major symphonies like the New York Philharmonic, the Boston Symphony Orchestra, the Philadelphia Orchestra, the Cleveland Orchestra, and the Chicago Symphony Orchestra among others.

== Biography ==
Born Frances Leone Lynch in Vancouver, Washington, Yeend grew up in Portland, Oregon. She had very little musical training before entering Washington State University (then Washington State College) in Pullman, Washington where she studied singing. Following several years of college, she worked as a music teacher for a few years, during which time she also sang as a recitalist and on the radio. She also made her professional opera début during this time as Nedda in Leoncavallo's Pagliacci in Spokane, Washington, although it wasn't until much later that she would appear in operas frequently.

Yeend's first New York appearances were in 1943 as a member of the ensemble in the Broadway run of The Merry Widow at the Majestic Theatre with Jan Kiepura as Danilo and Marta Eggerth as Sonia. Around this time she also sang on network radio as an uncredited soloist with Phil Spitalny and His All-Girl Orchestra. She joined Columbia Artists Management (CAM) in 1944 and performed the role of Micaela in a U.S tour of Bizet's Carmen that autumn.

In 1945 &1963 she was a soloist with the Naumburg Orchestral Concerts, in the Naumburg Bandshell, Central Park, in the summer series.

In April 1946 Yeend made her first major concert appearance as the soprano soloist in Beethoven's Ninth Symphony with the Boston Symphony Orchestra under the direction of Serge Koussevitzky. The following summer she performed the role of Ellen Orford in the American premiere of Benjamin Britten's Peter Grimes at the Tanglewood Music Festival. Yeend went on to become one of the members of CAM's Bel Canto Trio with Mario Lanza and George London. She toured North America with the group in 1947–1948.

In 1948 Yeend was invited by Laszlo Halasz, then artistic director of the New York City Opera, to join the roster of principal sopranos at the NYCO. She accepted and made her debut with the company as Violetta in Verdi's La traviata on March 20, 1948. She portrayed many other roles with the NYCO over a span of eleven consecutive seasons. Her early parts with the company were from the lyric soprano repertoire, such as Nedda, Countess Almaviva in Mozart's The Marriage of Figaro, Marguerite in Gounod's Faust, Micaela in Bizet's Carmen, and the three heroines in Offenbach's The Tales of Hoffmann. Later on in her career with the company she began portraying heavier roles from the dramatic soprano repertoire, including Amelia in Menotti's Amelia Goes to the Ball, Eva in Wagner's Die Meistersinger, the title role in Verdi's Aida, the title roles in Giacomo Puccini's Tosca and Turandot among others. She also notably sang Felice in the United States premiere of Wolf Ferrari's I quattro rusteghi with the NYCO in 1951. Her last appearance with the company was in November 1958 as Mimi in Puccini's La Bohème.

While busy singing with the NYCO, Yeend also sang in operas with other companies in both the United States and Europe. She made her debut with the Vienna Staatsoper in 1953 as Violetta. That same year she made her first appearance at London's Royal Opera House at Covent Garden as Mimi. In 1956 she toured North America with the NBC Opera Theatre portraying Cio-cio-san in Puccini's Madama Butterfly. Another Puccini role, the ice princess Turandot, was a part with which Yeend became particularly associated, portraying the part with the San Antonio Grand Opera Festival, Cincinnati Opera, New Orleans Opera, San Francisco Opera, Philadelphia Lyric Opera Company (1958), Vienna State Opera (1958) and at the Arena di Verona Festival (1958).

In 1959 Yeend sang her first Elisabeth in Wagner's Tannhäuser with Fort Worth Opera and portrayed her first Ariadne in Strauss's Ariadne auf Naxos at the Empire State Music Festival. She appeared at the Houston Grand Opera in 1960 for her first portrayal of the role of Sieglinde in Wagner's Die Walküre and that same year sang Abigaille in Verdi's Nabucco at the San Antonio Opera. In the summer of 1961 she portrayed Donna Anna in Mozart's Don Giovanni with the Zoo Opera in Cincinnati. Some of her other notable international appearances included Mimì in Bulawayo, Rhodesia, Violetta at the Bavarian State Opera, Eva at the Liceu, and the Israeli premiere of Verdi's Requiem in Tel Aviv with the Israel Philharmonic Orchestra (1954).

Yeend made her Metropolitan Opera debut on February 13, 1961 as Chrysothemis in Strauss's Elektra in 1961 with Inge Borkh in the title role and Joseph Rosenstock conducting. She also portrayed Violetta at the Met in performances opposite both George Shirley and Charles Anthony in the role of Alfredo. Her last performance with the company was on December 4, 1963 as Gutrune in Wagner's Götterdämmerung with Birgit Nilsson as Brünnhilde, Hans Hopf as Siegfried, and Walter Cassel as Gunther. One of the last opera performances of her career was as Desdemona in Verdi's Otello with the Philadelphia Grand Opera Company opposite Mario Del Monaco in the title role in 1964.

Yeend retired from the stage in 1966 when she joined the faculty of West Virginia University as Professor of Voice/Artist in Residence. She remained in that position until 1978 when she retired from teaching. She died thirty years later at the age of 95. She was married for fifty-four years to pianist James Benner who was her second husband. She had one son, Warren Yeend, by her first marriage to Kenneth Yeend which ended in divorce.

== Recordings ==
Yeend made a number of recordings during her career on the RCA Victor, Columbia, Mercury, MGM and DaVinci labels. Most of her recordings are of the concert repertoire, including of particular note her lauded recording of Beethoven's Ninth Symphony with the New York Philharmonic under Bruno Walter and her recording of Arthur Honegger's oratorio Jeanne d'Arc au Bûcher (Joan of Arc at the Stake) with the Philadelphia Orchestra. Among a relatively small number of opera recordings is the spectacular 1956 concert performance of scenes from Elektra with the Chicago Symphony and Chorus under Fritz Reiner, where she sang Chrysotemis to Inge Borkh's Elektra.
