= Lauren Flanigan =

American operatic soprano

Lauren Flanigan (born May 18, 1958) is an American operatic soprano who has had an active international career since the 1980s. She enjoyed a particularly fruitful partnership with the New York City Opera, appearing with the company almost every year since 1990. She has sung more than 100 different opera roles on stage during her career, often appearing in contemporary works or more rarely staged operas. Opera News stated that, "Flanigan has enjoyed one of the most distinctive careers of any artist of her generation, one marked by a high volume of contemporary works. Modern composers love her because of her innate musicality, dramatic power and lightning-fast skills and instincts."

== Education and early career ==
Flanigan was born in San Francisco, California, the daughter of Irish and Pennsylvania Dutch parents. In 1971, at the age of 12, she appeared as Flora in Benjamin Britten's The Turn of the Screw with the San Francisco Western Opera Theatre. Her portrayal of Flora resulted in being offered a full scholarship to study music, violin and voice in the pre-college program at the San Francisco Conservatory of Music. While there she studied voice with Alice Taylor. She went on to earn a Bachelor of Music degree from Boston University where she was a voice student of Mac Morgan. She pursued graduate studies in vocal performance with Judith Raskin at the Manhattan School of Music, earning a Master of Music degree in 1984. In 1986 she was accepted as a post graduate student in voice at the Juilliard School.

Flanigan credits much of her early experience to the singular interest of Dr. Robert Larsen of the Des Moines Metro Opera where in 1985 she was cast as Clorinda in Gioachino Rossini's La Cenerentola and as Curley's Wife in Carlisle Floyd's Of Mice and Men. This was followed by performances in 1987 as Musetta in Giacomo Puccini's La bohème and Miss Jessel in The Turn of the Screw; 1989 as Rosalinda in Johann Strauss II's Die Fledermaus; and 1990 in Britten's Peter Grimes. In 1986 she performed the role of Leila in Georges Bizet's Les Pecheurs de Perles for the Hawaii Opera Theatre. In 1987 she appeared in the world premiere of Stewart Wallace's Where's Dick? with Opera Omaha under the direction of Anne Bogart. She returned to Omaha in 1988 to perform the role of Sophie Scholl in the United States premiere of Udo Zimmermann's Weiße Rose. In January of that same year she premiered at St Clement's Church in New York City, Music-Theatre Group's reworking of the Massenet opera Cendrillon in a new production titled Cinderella/Cendrillon and reimagined by playwright Eve Ensler, music director Jeff Halprin and stage director Anne Bogart.

In 1990 Flanigan sang the role of Christine in Richard Strauss' Intermezzo with the Glimmerglass Opera, returning there two years later to portray the Governess in The Turn of the Screw. In 1991 she made her debut at the Seattle Opera as Donna Anna in Wolfgang Amadeus Mozart's Don Giovanni, later returning there as the Governess and as Violetta in Giuseppe Verdi's La traviata. In 1992 she sang the role of the Bride/Wife/Mother in the United States premiere of Judith Weir's The Vanishing Bridegroom at the Opera Theatre of Saint Louis.

== Singing in New York City ==
Flanigan made her debut at the New York City Opera (NYCO) in October 1990 as Musetta in La bohème with Jianyi Zhang as Rodolfo, Geraldine McMillian as Mimi, Peter Barcza as Marcello, and Joseph Colaneri conducting. She made her debut at the Metropolitan Opera the following year as Lucienne in the world premiere of John Corigliano's The Ghosts of Versailles. She returned to the Met in 1993 to portray the role of the Foreign Princess in Antonín Dvořák's Rusalka (with Gwynne Geyer in the title role and Ben Heppner as the Prince) and Giselda in Giuseppe Verdi's I Lombardi alla prima crociata (opposite Luciano Pavarotti and Samuel Ramey). She made her last appearance to date at the Met on October 6, 1994 as Musetta to the Mimì of Angela Gheorghiu and Rodolfo as Richard Leech.

While Flanigan's appearances at the Met have been limited, she has remained a constant presence at the NYCO for the past two decades. For this company, she created the title role in the world premiere of Hugo Weisgall's Esther on 8 October 1993 and the role of Eve in the premiere of Deborah Drattell's Lilith in November 2001. Some of the other roles she has sung with the company include Ursula in Mathis der Maler (1995), the Governess in The Turn of the Screw (1996), Anna I in Kurt Weill's The Seven Deadly Sins (1997), Lady Macbeth in Giuseppe Verdi's Macbeth (1997 and 2001), Abigail Borden in Jack Beeson's Lizzie Borden (1999), Greta in Drattell's Festival of Regrets (1999), Susan B. Anthony in Virgil Thomson's The Mother of Us All (2000), Elizabeth I in Gaetano Donizetti's Roberto Devereux (2000), Marietta in Erich Wolfgang Korngold's Die tote Stadt (2001), Christine Mannon in Marvin David Levy's Mourning Becomes Electra (2003), the title role in Samuel Barber's Vanessa (2007), and Cleopatra in Barber's Antony and Cleopatra (2008–2009). She was most recently heard with the company in a revival of Weisgall's Esther in 2009 and in 2011 as Myra in Stephen Schwartz's Séance on a Wet Afternoon.

Flanigan has also appeared in numerous concerts and operas at Carnegie Hall. Carnegie Hall notably commissioned composer Philip Glass's Symphony No. 6, Plutonian Ode, specifically for her.

== Other work in the United States and abroad ==
In March 1996 Flanigan made her debut at La Scala as Abigaille in Giuseppe Verdi's Nabucco under conductor Riccardo Muti. On 6 September 1996 she made her debut at the San Francisco Opera as Yaroslavna in Alexander Borodin's Prince Igor, with Sergei Leiferkus in the title role. In 1998 she made her debut at the Lyric Opera of Chicago as Christine Mannon in Marvin David Levy's Mourning Becomes Electra. She appeared at the Santa Fe Opera in 2000 as the Prima Donna in Hans Werner Henze's Venus und Adonis. She returned to Chicago in 2004-2005 to portray Tulip in the world premiere of William Bolcom's A Wedding. On 2 June 2007 she created the title role in the world premiere of Thomas Pasatieri's Frau Margot at the Fort Worth Opera. She has also appeared at the Bavarian State Opera, the Glyndebourne Festival Opera, and the Teatro San Carlo.

== Recordings ==
Flanigan has sung on recordings of Ned Rorem's The Sun Cantata, Amy Beach's Cabildo, Thomas Pasatieri's Frau Margot, Pasatieri's Monologues, Philip Glass's Symphony No. 6 (Plutonian Ode), Gustav Mahler's Symphony #8, Deems Taylor's Peter Ibbetson, and Howard Hanson's Merry Mount. In 2002 her recording of Richard Strauss's Die Liebe der Danae was nominated for a Grammy Award for Best Opera Recording. She can be seen as the Ice Skating Opera Diva in the motion picture Death to Smoochy.

== Awards and honours ==
- Betty Allen Prize from the New York City Opera
- Diva Award from Emmanuel Ungaro
- An award from American Society of Composers, Authors and Publishers for her commitment to performing the works of living composers.
- Artist of the Year Award from the Center for Contemporary Opera.
- She is featured in the books Bad Behavior and The Irish Face.
- Thrice named one of the "Top 100 Irish Americans" by Irish America Magazine for her concert series Comfort Ye, which raises food and clothing for New York's homeless.
- The Spirit of the City Award from the Cathedral of St. John the Divine for enlivening the musical life of New York City.
- The Distinguished Alumni Award from Boston University.
- Lifetime Achievement Award from The Licia Albanese-Puccini Foundation
- Lifetime Achievement Award from Career Bridges
- Good Neighbor Award from Goddard Riverside for her work open behalf on New York's Homeless
