= Marie Collier =

Australian opera soprano (1927–1971)

- Born: 16 April 1927; Ballarat, Victoria, Australia
- Died: 8 December 1971 (aged 44); London, England
- Occupation: Operatic soprano
- Years active: 1952–1971

Marie Elizabeth Collier (16 April 1927 – 8 December 1971) was an Australian operatic soprano.

Marie Collier was born in Ballarat, Victoria, to Thomas Robinson Collier (1894–1962), a railway employee, and his wife Annie Marie (née Bechaz). She attended Camberwell High School from 1941 to 1943. On leaving school, she worked as a pharmacist's assistant. Due to an injured wrist, she gave up the piano and began training as a singer. She first came to prominence in March 1952 singing the role of Santuzza in Cavalleria rusticana for the National Theatre Opera company in Melbourne. On 10 December 1952, she married Victor Benjamin Vorwerg (a civil engineer) in the chapel of Melbourne Church of England Grammar School. Collier became more widely known in Australia during 1953–54 while performing Magda Sorel in Gian Carlo Menotti's The Consul, for a total of seventy-five performances in Melbourne, Sydney and regional areas.

Collier studied in Milan in 1955, where she was auditioned by Lord Harewood. Subsequently, she was offered a contract as a regular member of the Covent Garden Opera Company. There, she made her Royal Opera House debut as the First Lady in The Magic Flute in 1956. She created the role of Hecuba in Michael Tippett's King Priam which premiered in Coventry in May 1962; and sang the leading roles in the Western premieres of Katerina Ismailova (2 December 1963) at the Royal Opera House, Covent Garden, and The Makropulos Case at Sadler's Wells (12 February 1964).

Other roles at Covent Garden in subsequent seasons included Musetta in La bohème; Giulietta in The Tales of Hoffmann; Liu in Turandot; Flora in La traviata; Butterfly in Madama Butterfly; and the title role in the 1963 production of Tosca. In May 1960 her role of Musetta was described by Evan Senior as "the most astonishing and effective playing and full-voiced singing of the role I have ever heard or seen".

She is probably best known as being the substitute Tosca in Covent Garden's famous 1965 revival of the 1964 Franco Zeffirelli production of the opera. When Maria Callas cancelled her appearances in three out of the four scheduled performances, Collier stepped in, to great acclaim.

In 1967, she created the role of Christine Mannon in the world premiere of Marvin David Levy's Mourning Becomes Electra at the Metropolitan Opera, in which Evelyn Lear and Sherrill Milnes also sang. Her other roles with the Met included Musetta, Tosca (on tour to Cleveland, Ohio), and Santuzza in Cavalleria rusticana.

In 1968, she participated in the first opera telecast in Australia (Tosca, with Donald Smith as Cavaradossi and Tito Gobbi as Scarpia).

She was also noted as Chrysothemis in Sir Georg Solti's acclaimed recording of Richard Strauss's Elektra, with Birgit Nilsson in the title role.

She was announced dead on 8 December 1971 due to intracranial hemorrhage and fractured skull in Charing Cross Hospital, London, after falling from a window on her London flat at the age of 44. This occurred shortly after she had been chosen to sing the part of Cassandra in Berlioz's opera Les Troyens at Covent Garden.
