= Herbert Barrett (talent manager) =

- Born: May 31, 1910; New York City, New York, U.S.
- Died: November 5, 2007 (aged 97); New York City
- Occupations: Talent manager, publicist
- Known for: Herbert Barrett Management

Herbert Barrett (May 31, 1910 – November 5, 2007) was an influential talent manager and publicist in the classical music world during the second half of the twentieth century. In 1940 he founded Herbert Barrett Management, serving as the firm's president until 1996. He remained a chairman at the firm until his death eleven years later. During his career he managed the careers of hundreds of artists, including Sherrill Milnes, Jennie Tourel, Eileen Farrell, Shirley Verrett, John Browning, Joseph Szigeti and Ralph Kirkpatrick.

== Biography ==
Born in New York City, Barrett was the son of Mollie Pike, a seamstress in the fur industry. He had two siblings and his father left the family early in his childhood. He attended Cornell University where he graduated Phi Beta Kappa in 1930. He began working as a publicist in 1933 and over the next seven years built an impressive roster of artists and artistic organizations that included clarinetist and bandleader Benny Goodman, dancer Martha Graham, impresario Sol Hurok, the Brooklyn Academy of Music, the Museum of Modern Art, and the Orquesta Sinfónica del Estado de México. During this period he also managed the national radio press coverage for the Cadillac Motor Car Company and General Motors, associations which led to collaborations with George Gershwin, Jascha Heifetz and Arturo Toscanini.

In 1940 he move from purely publicist work to working as a talent manager for musicians when he founded Herbert Barrett Management. Two of his most important clients were baritone Sherrill Milnes and pianist John Browning, and Barrett is credited as helping them to build successful careers. Barrett's firm quickly garnered a high reputation in the classical music world and over the next half century he managed hundreds of successful artists, including the Martha Argerich, the Bach Aria Group, Wilhelm Backhaus, Grace Bumbry, Carlos Chávez, John Houseman and The Acting Company, Stuart Gordon's Organic Theater Company, Benno Moiseiwitsch, the Negro Ensemble Company, Guiomar Novaes, Ruggiero Ricci, Kenneth Schermerhorn, Ravi Shankar, Billy Taylor, Michael Tippett, and Tatiana Troyanos to name just a few. At the time of his death the Herbert Barrett Management was the largest privately held talent management company of its kind.

Barrett was also one of the instrumental forces behind the "Great Performers Series" at Lincoln Center, notably managing the inaugural 1965 series. He also served on the committee to Save Carnegie Hall when the concert hall was threatened with demolition in the 1960s. Barrett was awarded the Patrick Hayes Award for outstanding service to the Arts from the International Society for the Performing Arts Foundation in 1997, and received a lifetime achievement award from the foundation in 2005.

In 2001 Barrett's wife of 64 years, Betty Barrett (née Palash), died. They had two daughters together, Katherine and Nancy, five grandchildren, and two great-grandchildren. Barrett died of heart failure in 2007 in New York City.
