= A Wedding (opera) =

2004 comic opera

A Wedding is a 2004 comic opera based on Robert Altman's 1978 film A Wedding and was composed by William Bolcom with a libretto written by Robert Altman and Arnold Weinstein.

== Performance history ==
The Lyric Opera of Chicago commissioned the work, and the opera was first performed there on December 11, 2004. The premiere had stage direction by Altman and was conducted by Dennis Russell Davies. The film's 48 characters were trimmed down to 19 on stage.

Since the premiere, A Wedding has seen performances at Indiana University's Jacobs School of Music, the University of Houston's Moores School of Music, University of Nebraska's Glenn Korff School of Music, and the Oberlin Conservatory of Music. It was performed by the Aspen Opera Center for the Aspen Music Festival and School's 2016 summer season.

The Music Academy of the West commissioned Bolcom to write a chamber version of the opera, with a reduced orchestration. This reorchestration received its premiere on August 8, 2008 in Santa Barbara, California.

== Roles ==
| Role (in order of vocal appearance) | Voice type | Premiere Cast, December 11, 2004 (Conductor: Dennis Russell Davies) |
|---|---|---|
| Rita Billingsley, the wedding directrix | soprano | Maria Kanyova |
| Nettie, grandmother of the groom | mezzo-soprano | Kathryn Harries |
| Antonia, her daughter | mezzo-soprano | Beth Clayton |
| Jules, her husband | baritone | Jake Gardner |
| Victoria, Nettie's daughter, the mother of the groom | soprano | Catherine Malfitano |
| Luigi, her husband, the father of the groom | tenor | Jerry Hadley |
| Diana, Victoria's sister | mezzo-soprano | Patricia Risley |
| Randolph, the Corelli butler | bass | Mark Doss (alternated with Kevin Short) |
| Bartender | bass or baritone | Levi Hernandez |
| Snooks, father of the bride | baritone | Mark Delavan |
| Tulip, mother of the bride | soprano | Lauren Flanigan |
| Buffy, sister of the bride | mute | Lauren Carter |
| Muffin, the bride | soprano | Anna Christy |
| Dino, the groom | tenor | Patrick Miller |
| Candace, Tulip's sister | soprano | Cynthia Lawrence |
| William Williamson, a hired guest | baritone | Timothy Nolen |
| Breedley, the best man | baritone | Brian Leerhuber |
| Aunt Bea, Nettie's sister | mezzo-soprano | Kathryn Harries |
| Donato, Luigi's brother | tenor | David Cangelosi |
Waiters, maids, photographers, and security

== Synopsis ==
=== Act I ===
Introduction. Dino and Muffin's wedding ceremony at a church in suburban Chicago.

Scene 1. Rita, the wedding organizer, gives orders to the bartenders working at the reception. A mysterious dog barks in the distance.

Scene 2. Nettie, the grandmother of the groom, has not attended the ceremony. She is in her bedroom in the family mansion. Her daughter Toni, with husband Jules, appear, followed by her other daughter Victoria with husband Luigi—the parents of the groom—and the unmarried third daughter, Diana. Jules, a physician turned art dealer, examines Nettie with a stethoscope. Victoria, too, is unwell and has missed the ceremony. Diana is in love with Randolph, the butler, who tells her that all the invited guests (some 200 of them) have sent regrets. Nettie closes her eyes and dies. Rita enters and discovers Nettie's death.

Scene 3. In the ballroom, the groom's family meets Snooks and Tulip, the parents of the bride, and their older daughter Buffy (a silent role) as well as Tulip's sister Candace. Jules is immediately attracted to Tulip.

Scene 4. The women make small talk in the powder room. Victoria's mysterious illness is mentioned again.

Scene 5. The men have drinks in the "grotto," Luigi's basement kingdom—a replica of a Roman trattoria. Snooks declines alcohol and tells the story of how he found God (or vice versa).

Scene 6. Jules and Toni in Nettie's room; Jules tells his wife that her mother needs rest.

Scene 7. In the ballroom. Enter William Williamson, the only guest at the wedding who is not a family member. It turns out that he was hired by Rita to attend the ceremony and shake everyone's hand. Jules discreetly tells Luigi that Nettie has died. The band strikes up a dance. Jules sneaks off to take care of Victoria.

Scene 8. Jules gives Victoria, a drug addict, her morphine shot.

Scene 9. The dance is in full swing. Buffy—a silent role—indicates to Dino in pantomime that she is pregnant and that he is the father. Jules woos Tulip with an aria about his glamorous art collection, and makes an advance that terrifies the mother of the bride.

Scene 10. In the ladies' room, Tulip meets Victoria and notices the sudden change in her demeanor. Left alone, she sings an aria about Jules, who has begun to sweep her off her feet. Jules enters the ladies' room. They agree to have a secret tryst in Tallahassee in two weeks. Tulip sings another aria, "a woman in love," and is almost late for the cutting of the cake.

=== Act II ===
Overture. The composer writes in the score: "The orchestra depicts a lone motorcycle coming from far away."

Scene 1. Enter Breedley, the best man who has missed the wedding because he spent the night in jail. Dino welcomes him and tells him about his predicament with Buffy.

Scene 2. In the ballroom, enter Aunt Bea (Nettie's twin sister, played by the same singer). Bea, also late for the ceremony, is an old socialist and shocks everyone with her wedding present, a painting featuring Muffin, the bride, in the nude, surrounded by factories and farms. Williamson, the hired guest, is the only one to defend the picture. Toni and Bea have a heated political argument. Then everyone heads for the cake table. Snooks wants to cover up the painting but Rita intervenes. He wants to punch her but Rita grabs his arm and bends it behind his back.

Scene 3. Breedley delivers an outrageous speech at the cake table. Immediately after, he spills the beans about Buffy's pregnancy to Candace, Tulip's sister. Tulip, who has just arrived after seeing Jules in the ladies' room, is horrified by the painting.

Scene 4. Luigi, alone in his grotto, feels homesick for Italy. Victoria enters. They reminisce about their past; Luigi doesn't get a chance to tell his wife that her mother has died.

Scene 5. Rita calls an emergency because of the appearance of a stranger, who turns out to be Donato, Luigi's brother, who speaks only Italian. Luigi, who has made a pact with his mother-in-law never to let any of his Italian relatives set foot in the house, threatens his brother with a knife. But Jules reminds him that, after Nettie's death, this pact is no longer valid. Luigi suddenly embraces his brother, who pulls a huge mortadella from a package. The two brothers sing a passionate duet in praise of Italian food, joined by the entire party.

Scene 6. Toni discovers that her mother is dead. The entire family assembles to hear the news. Aunt Bea, the last to leave the room, bumps into Mr. Williamson. They hit it off...

Scene 7. Dino complains to Breedley about how his irresistible charm has gotten him into trouble. Breedley drags his friend, who is completely drunk, into the shower to sober him up. Outside the shower, Muffin sings an aria about how she first met Dino. Rita enters and shows her affection for Muffin in a most inappropriate way. Muffin runs off. We see, through the shower door, Breedley and Dino naked in the shower, Breedley repeatedly trying to get Dino to stand up, and Dino falling down each time. Breedley comes out in a wet towel as Muffin arrives. She goes into the shower; she and Dino kiss.

Scene 8. Candace tells Snooks that Buffy is pregnant by Dino. There is a family conference at which Buffy, always in pantomime, reveals that she has slept with an entire military academy. Thus, Dino is not necessarily the father of her child.

Scene 9. Outside the mansion, Snooks and Tulip prepare to leave. Tulip says goodbye to Jules, till Tallahassee. An angry confrontation between the bride's and the groom's families is disrupted by the sound of a car crash. Dino's car was in an accident, and apparently the newlyweds were both killed. Brought together by common grief, all sing a chorale. But then, to general consternation, Muffin appears with Dino, freshly out of the shower. It was Breedley who had driven off in Dino's car and crashed it. Snooks, forgetting about his vow, demands champagne. Everyone dances in great joy.

Scene 10. Jules and Tulip meet secretly in the ladies' room. Tulip calls off the tryst in Tallahassee. Jules rejoins Victoria to give her one more shot of morphine. Diana goes off with Randolph, the butler.

Scene 11. Luigi leaves Victoria to return to Italy with his brother. Everyone says goodbye: "Weddings are the happiest events, but...when it's over, it gets real sad." The mysterious dog returns and wags his tail.

== Orchestration ==
A Wedding is scored for:

Woodwinds
3 Flutes (3 dbl. Piccolo)
3 Oboes (3 dbl. English Horn)
2 Clarinets in Bb/A (1. also dbl. Eb Piccolo Clarinet)
Bass clarinet (dbl. Eb Piccolo Clarinet)
2 Bassoons
Contrabassoon

Brass
4 Horns in F
3 Trumpets in C (1. dbl. Piccolo Trumpet in Eb)
2 Trombones
Bass trombone
Tuba

Harp

Percussion
Timpani
3 Percussion

Keyboard

Strings

== Reception ==
Anthony Tommasini of The New York Times writes in his review: "Most composers count themselves lucky to secure even one commission from a major opera company. William Bolcom has had three in relatively quick order from one America's leading companies, the Lyric Opera of Chicago. The first resulted in the intense and gothic McTeague, of 1992. Then came A View From the Bridge in 1999, a work Mr. Bolcom described as his journey into Brooklyn verismo. On Saturday night the Lyric Opera presented the world premiere of A Wedding, adapted from Robert Altman's 1978 film. I wish I could report that the Lyric Opera's admirable faith in Mr. Bolcom, a prodigiously skilled composer, has emboldened him. But musically A Wedding plays it safe. In some ways it is the least compelling of the three works, each written with Mr. Bolcom's longtime lyricist, Arnold Weinstein, as librettist.

== Film ==
A Wedding is a 1978 comedy film directed by Robert Altman, with an ensemble cast that included Desi Arnaz, Jr., Carol Burnett, Paul Dooley, Vittorio Gassman, Mia Farrow, Lillian Gish, Geraldine Chaplin, Howard Duff, Nina Van Pallandt, Amy Stryker, and Pat McCormick. The story is told in the trademark Altman style, with multiple plots and overlapping humorous dialogue. The story takes place in a single day during a lavish wedding that merges a nouveau riche Southern family with an established wealthy Chicago family having possible ties to organized crime.
