= Turkevich =

Turkevich is a surname. Notable people with the surname include:

- Anthony L. Turkevich (1916–2002), American radiochemist
- Leonid Ieronimovich Turkevich (1876–1965), Russian clergyman
- Ludmilla Buketoff Turkevich (1909–1995), American literary scholar
