= Tatiana Troyanos =

American mezzo-soprano (1938–1993)

- Born: September 12, 1938; New York City, New York, U.S.
- Died: August 21, 1993 (aged 54); New York City, New York, U.S.
- Education: Juilliard School
- Occupation: Operatic mezzo-soprano

Tatiana Troyanos (September 12, 1938 – August 21, 1993) was an American operatic mezzo-soprano remembered as "one of the defining singers of her generation". Her voice, "a paradoxical voice — larger than life yet intensely human, brilliant yet warm, lyric yet dramatic" — "was the kind you recognize after one bar, and never forget", wrote Cori Ellison in Opera News.

Troyanos' performances "covered the full range of operatic history" in an international career of three decades that also produced a variety of operatic recordings, among them Carmen (co-starring Plácido Domingo and conducted by Georg Solti), cited almost four decades later as "the finest of all Carmens." After ten years based at the Hamburg State Opera, Troyanos became widely known for her work with the Metropolitan Opera beginning in 1976, with over 270 performances (several dozen of them broadcast or televised) spanning twenty-two major roles.

== Early life ==
Born in New York City, Troyanos spent her earliest days in the Manhattan neighborhood where Lincoln Center, the new home of the Metropolitan Opera, would arise a quarter century later. She grew up in Forest Hills, Queens, and attended Forest Hills High School. Her early childhood was clouded by a deep sense of abandonment; her parents, operatic hopefuls who, she said, "had beautiful voices"—her father, born on the Greek island of Cephalonia, was a tenor, and her mother, from Stuttgart, was a coloratura soprano — had separated when she was an infant and later divorced, "ill-matched to each other and ill-suited to parenthood".

She was looked after by Greek relatives and lived for around a decade at the Brooklyn Home for Children, which had relocated to Forest Hills. She said of her childhood, "My past is hard to overcome." She described the children's home itself as "bleak but marvelous". It was there that her life in music began. She studied piano for seven years, first at the home, where her instructor was Metropolitan Opera bassoonist Louis Pietrini, who had volunteered to teach the children a variety of instruments — initially teaching them solfège, which Troyanos later called "the basis of my musical education" — and her studies continued, on scholarship, at the Brooklyn Music School. In several interviews she recalled early expectations of becoming a concert pianist. "Determined since childhood", by other accounts, "to become an opera singer," she sang in school choirs and New York's All City High School Chorus; when she was sixteen, a teacher heard her voice in the chorus and took time "to find out who the voice belonged to ... and got me to the Juilliard Preparatory School and my first voice teacher".

In her late teens, she moved to the Girls' Service League in Manhattan and later to a co-ed boarding house not far from the old Met, which she frequently attended as a standee. She was employed as a secretary to the director of publicity at Random House, and performed in choruses, ranging from church choirs (with a scholarship at the First Presbyterian Church) to musical theater; "Tatiana Troyanos, almost hidden in the chorus, came soaring through with a pellucid and magnificent quality of tone as the Arab Singing Girl," proclaimed Kevin Kelly of The Boston Globe in his review of a summer stock production of Fanny in September 1958.

Continuing at the Juilliard School, Troyanos was chosen as a soloist for Bach's St. John Passion in 1959 and for the Verdi Requiem in 1962, by which time she had begun vocal studies with Hans Heinz, who "understood my voice and helped me open it up at the top ... and gradually I found all my top notes." She described Heinz, with whom she continued to study after her graduation in 1963, as "the major influence in my life ... Our work together built the foundation that was so essential to my career."

== Operatic career: 1963–93 ==
=== New York City Opera and Hamburg years ===
After a long run in the nuns' chorus in the original Broadway production of The Sound of Music, Troyanos was engaged by the New York City Opera and made her professional operatic debut in April 1963, on the first night of the spring season, as Hippolyta in the New York premiere production of Britten's A Midsummer Night's Dream. She sang Jocasta in Stravinsky's Oedipus rex that season, Marina in the company's first production of Mussorgsky's Boris Godunov the following year, and various other roles through 1965. These years also saw performances of Dorabella in Così fan tutte at the Aspen Music Festival, Carmen at the Kentucky Opera, the contralto roles in Iolanthe and The Yeomen of the Guard at the Boston Arts Festival, as well as Herodias in Salome with the Toronto Symphony.

Offered a Metropolitan Opera contract with limited stage opportunities, but choosing a path also taken by other American singers at the time, she left in the summer of 1965 in quest of more intensive performing experience in Europe, where, having auditioned successfully for three companies, she was to make the Hamburg State Opera, led by the nurturing Rolf Liebermann, her home base for the next decade, first as a member of its renowned ensemble and later as a guest artist. "It made sense to go to Germany," she recalled. "I found an intendant [Liebermann] ... who encouraged me and who knew how to further my career slowly. That was really what I wanted. I wanted to be in the theater every day, learning roles slowly, not quickly, and certainly not under any kind of pressure. That's really what I got." Her first parts there included Lola in Cavalleria rusticana and Preziosilla in the premiere of a new production of La forza del destino, and by year's end she was singing Carmen, a key role she would later bring to Geneva, London, and the Metropolitan Opera spring tour. Eventually at Hamburg she would sing, in her words, "just about every mezzo role around."

But it was the Aix-en-Provence Festival in 1966 (for which Liebermann himself had recommended her) that saw her breakthrough performance in Richard Strauss's Ariadne auf Naxos (to the Ariadne of Régine Crespin). In her role debut as the Composer, wrote Elizabeth Forbes, "she made a heart-breaking—and heart-broken—adolescent, whose voice, in Strauss's great paean to the power of music, soared into the warm, Provencal night and seemed to hang there like the stars of a rocket."

That performance, followed by her first Octavian in Strauss's Der Rosenkavalier at London's Covent Garden in 1968 (to the Marschallin of Lisa Della Casa), effectively initiated her international career—although, said Liebermann, "she returned to Hamburg unspoiled" after her triumph at Aix and "'took up her modest engagements as if nothing had happened.'" The early success at Aix was caught by French television and a kinescope has been preserved.

"Troyanos has a sumptuous voice, a very sharp intelligence, enormous ambition, and do-or-die determination to be a great artist," observed British record producer Walter Legge, whose laurels included many of Maria Callas's classic recordings. Troyanos concurred, "I have this do-or-die determination, probably to overcome past insecurities, difficulties, fears ... certain things never go away. There are things within me that I live with and channel into exciting performances." A 1967 Hamburg Opera tour first brought her to the stage of the Metropolitan Opera's new home at Lincoln Center in a selection of twentieth-century repertory including Stravinsky's The Rake's Progress, in which she "especially excelled with her rich voice" as Baba the Turk.

Her appearance as Handel's Ariodante opposite Beverly Sills in the opening week of the Kennedy Center in 1971 (under the baton of Julius Rudel, who had originally brought her to the New York City Opera) served to reintroduce her to American opera audiences. There followed debuts at the Lyric Opera of Chicago (as Charlotte in Massenet's Werther, 1971), Dallas Opera (Dido in Purcell's Dido and Aeneas, 1972), Opera Company of Boston (Romeo in Bellini's I Capuleti e i Montecchi, 1975), and notably at San Francisco Opera (Poppea in Monteverdi's L'incoronazione di Poppea, 1975—about which Chronicle reviewer Robert Commanday wrote, "The means by which Poppea seduces Nero ... could liquefy even stone the way the sensational new mezzo soprano Tatiana Troyanos sang").

=== The Metropolitan Opera years ===
Troyanos returned to New York to make her Metropolitan Opera debut as Octavian, closely followed by the Composer, in the spring of 1976. "The star of the show was Miss Troyanos ... the most aristocratic Octavian at the Met in years," wrote Speight Jenkins in a review of the Rosenkavalier in the New York Post. "She has a large, warming lyric mezzo-soprano with perfect control ... her singing of the Trio and the final duet was perfection itself." Octavian (her most frequently sung role at the Met, with thirty performances through 1986) and the Composer were often described as her signature or calling-card roles. She also became closely identified, on stage and screen, with another trouser role, Sesto in Mozart's La clemenza di Tito, and Martin Mayer wrote in Opera magazine that she "gave the work a dramatic punch few of us had known was there." Her other most frequent appearances at the Met were as Prince Orlofsky in Johann Strauss's Die Fledermaus, Venus in Wagner's Tannhäuser, Giulietta in Offenbach's Les contes d'Hoffmann, and Eboli in Verdi's Don Carlos.

A mainstay and "one of the most beloved artists at the Metropolitan Opera" from 1976 until her death in 1993, she was internationally revered for her uniquely sensual, burnished sound, her versatility and beauty, as well as the thrilling intensity of all her performances. "Because of the burning intensity and conviction of her dramatic projection," wrote Clyde T. McCants in his book on American opera singers, "sometimes listening to Troyanos's recordings we tend to forget the radiant glory of the voice itself."

While the St. James Opera Encyclopedia acknowledged that "the persistent pulse of her vibrato," which imbued roles like Carmen with "a fiercely elemental life force," was "not to every listener's taste," David Hamilton offered another perspective: the "close pickup" of one recording, he wrote in High Fidelity magazine, "unflatteringly magnifies the natural vibrato of Tatiana Troyanos' beautiful voice into something more like a beat ... a distortion of the effect she makes in a hall."

As her "vibrato uncoiled to yield a plummier sound", wrote Cori Ellison, "she chose to stretch her medium-weight voice to suit her temperament", adding Wagner roles at the Met—beginning with Venus in Tannhäuser (opening the 1978 season) and Kundry in Parsifal (initially in a Saturday matinee broadcast in 1980) — while continuing to sing Mozart, Handel, and Cavalli.

From 1981 to 1983, she appeared in all three season opening nights at the Met — "typically enough", James Levine, the conductor for all three, noted, "in three different styles and languages" — as Adalgisa in Bellini's Norma in 1981 (opposite Renata Scotto and Plácido Domingo), Octavian in Strauss's Der Rosenkavalier in 1982 (opposite Kiri Te Kanawa and Kurt Moll), and Didon in Berlioz's Les Troyens in 1983. She also appeared in seven new productions at the Met, including the company's premiere productions of Berg's Lulu (as Countess Geschwitz) in 1977, Stravinsky's Oedipus Rex (as Jocasta) in 1981, Mozart's La Clemenza di Tito (as Sesto) in 1984, and Handel's Giulio Cesare (as Cleopatra) in 1988. In her La Scala debut in 1977, she sang in Norma opposite Montserrat Caballé in the first opera performance to be televised live throughout the world.

=== Opera and concert repertoire ===
Troyanos was known for her impassioned portrayals of everything from trouser roles to femmes fatales; "the most boyish rose-bearer was also the most womanly Charlotte," wrote George Birnbaum in the Classical CD Scout. "I'm lucky that I look like the roles I do, whether it's Octavian or Carmen or Kundry or Giulietta ... It's a flexible look and I'm a flexible actress. I must get ahold of a role or die", Troyanos once said.

Asked which mezzo type she'd rather play, "somebody's mother or some guy", Troyanos once quipped: "I prefer the guys — but maybe a guy who also wears a beautiful dress from time to time."

In Handel's Giulio Cesare, she sang both leading parts: Cleopatra (here essaying a soprano role, opposite Dietrich Fischer-Dieskau on Karl Richter's 1969 recording for Deutsche Grammophon), and the alto title role of Caesar (at the opera in San Francisco in 1982, Geneva in 1983, and at the Met in 1988).

Other roles Troyanos sang on opera stages in the course of her career included

- Cavalli's Diana (in La Calisto)
- Gluck's Orfeo (in Orfeo ed Euridice)
- Cimarosa's Elisetta (in Il matrimonio segreto)
- Mozart's Cherubino (in Le nozze di Figaro) and Donna Elvira (in Don Giovanni)
- Donizetti's Giovanna Seymour (in Anna Bolena) and Maffio Orsini (in Lucrezia Borgia)
- Verdi's Amneris (in Aida)
- Puccini's Suzuki (in Madama Butterfly)
- Wagner's Venus ( in Tannhäuser), Brangäne (in Tristan und Isolde), Fricka (in Das Rheingold), Waltraute (in Götterdämmerung), and Kundry (in Parsifal)
- Humperdinck's Hansel (in Hansel and Gretel)
- Richard Strauss's Clairon (in Capriccio)
- Berlioz's Marguerite (in La damnation de Faust)
- Saint-Saëns' Dalila (in Samson and Delilah)

and two roles she created,

- Penderecki's Sister Jeanne (in The Devils of Loudun), Hamburg State Opera, 1969
- Glass's Queen Isabella (in The Voyage), Metropolitan Opera, 1992

Her singing was preserved in thirty-five live Metropolitan Opera broadcasts of complete operas (a number of which, including roles she never recorded in the studio — Princess Eboli, Giulietta, Brangäne, Waltraute, Geschwitz — have been restored in recent years for the Met's satellite radio channel); she was also heard in broadcasts from San Francisco Opera (including Poppea and Caesar—the latter was chosen as SFO's archival rebroadcast for 2016) and Lyric Opera of Chicago (including Romeo and the Rheingold Fricka). Eight more Met performances, plus a joint concert with Plácido Domingo, were televised, as were Norma (opposite Joan Sutherland) at Canadian Opera Company, and the last production in which she appeared, Capriccio at San Francisco Opera.

All these telecasts have been released in home video versions except for the Met's Die Fledermaus and Les contes d'Hoffmann, which are available from its streaming service, "Opera on Demand".

Troyanos sang roles in concert performances of operas ranging from Ulysses in Handel's Deidamia (Washington, 1987) and Farnace in Mozart's Mitridate, re di Ponto (New York, 1992) to Sara in Donizetti's Roberto Devereux (London, 1970) and Judith in Bartók's Bluebeard's Castle (in Hungarian, under Georg Solti, Pierre Boulez and Rafael Kubelik in Chicago, Cleveland, New York and London between 1972 and 1981). In 1984 she sang with the Philadelphia Orchestra in the world premiere, in English, of Act I of Rachmaninoff's opera Monna Vanna, which had been left in piano score by the composer and orchestrated by Igor Buketoff. Along with Monna Vanna, her performances of such pieces as Berlioz's Les nuits d'été and Mahler's Rückert Songs and Das Lied von der Erde could be heard on radio broadcasts of major American orchestras. She was featured in Chicago Symphony broadcasts from the Ravinia Festival from 1980 to 1990, which included works like Beethoven's Missa Solemnis and Mahler's Das klagende Lied. She was active as a song recitalist (her first recital was at the Paris Opera in 1972.

She made a Carnegie Hall recital debut in 1978), as well as in a series of duo recitals with the soprano Benita Valente which began after they co-starred in Ariodante at the Santa Fe Opera in 1987. Concert telecasts with Troyanos included Schoenberg's Gurre-Lieder with the Boston Symphony in 1979 and a recital with pianist Martin Katz, featuring Ravel's Shéhérazade, Falla's Siete canciones populares españolas and songs by Berlioz and Mahler, at the Casals Festival in 1985.

== Audio and video discography ==
Troyanos enjoyed an equally versatile career as a recording artist; her first appearance as a soloist in a recording hall was as Dorabella, opposite Leontyne Price's Fiordiligi, in Mozart's Così fan tutte under Erich Leinsdorf (recorded in London in 1967, released in 1968, and winner of the Grammy Award for Best Opera Recording in 1969). She went on to sing Cherubino in Karl Böhm's recording of Mozart's The Marriage of Figaro, the title role in Bizet's Carmen for Sir Georg Solti (she was described in the Penguin classical record guide as "quite simply the subtlest Carmen on record ... Troyanos' singing is delicately seductive too"), the Composer in Ariadne for both Böhm and Solti, Dido in Purcell's Dido and Aeneas for both Charles Mackerras and Raymond Leppard, and Anita in Leonard Bernstein's high-profile (if controversial) operatic recording of his West Side Story, among numerous other roles. David Anthony Fox in the St. James Opera Encyclopedia concluded that many of Troyanos's discs "capture her faithfully — or ... as faithfully as is possible without her marvelous physical presence ... In fact, she never made a bad record, and—artist that she was—in every case Troyanos contributed something unique and memorable."

These recordings were released commercially on LP and/or CD:

- Bartók, Bluebeard's Castle – Judith (Boulez, 1976, Columbia/Sony)
- Beethoven, Symphony No. 9 (Böhm, 1970, DG)
- Bellini, I Capuleti e i Montecchi – Romeo (Caldwell/Scott, live 1975, VAI)
- Bellini, Norma – Adalgisa (Cillario, live 1975, Gala)
- Bellini, Norma – Adalgisa (Levine, 1979, Columbia/Sony)
- Berlioz: Les Troyens, Plácido Domingo, Allan Monk (Chorèbe), John Cheek, Paul Plishka (Narbal), Douglas Ahlstedt, Philip Creech, Claudia Catania, Jessye Norman (Cassandre), Tatiana Troyanos (Didon), Jocelyne Taillon; Metropolitan Opera orchestra and chorus,James Levine. DVD: Deutsche Grammophon Cat: 00440 073 4310. CD: Laser Disc: Pioneer Artists Cat: PA-85-137 (1983)
- Bernstein, West Side Story – Anita (Bernstein, 1985, DG)
- Bizet, Carmen (Solti, 1975, Decca/London)
- Cavalieri, Rappresentatione di Anima, e di Corpo – Anima (Mackerras, 1970, DG Archiv)
- Donizetti, Lucrezia Borgia – Orsini (Rescigno, live 1974, Melodram)
- Handel, Giulio Cesare in Egitto – Cleopatra (Richter, 1969, DG)
- Mahler, Symphony No. 2, "Resurrection" (Boulez, live 1973, Documents)
- Mascagni, Cavalleria rusticana – Santuzza (Schermerhorn, live 1976, Gala)
- Massenet, Werther – Charlotte (Plasson, 1979, EMI/Angel)
- Mozart, Così fan tutte – Dorabella (Leinsdorf, 1967, RCA/BMG)
- Mozart, Così fan tutte – Dorabella (Maag, live 1968, Mondo Musica)
- Mozart, Die Gärtnerin aus Liebe (La Finta Giardiniera) – Ramiro (Schmidt-Isserstedt, 1972, Philips)
- Mozart, Le nozze di Figaro – Cherubino (Böhm, 1968, DG)
- Mozart, Le nozze di Figaro – Marcellina (Levine, 1990, DG)
- Mozart, Missa Brevis in C, "Sparrow Mass" (Kubelik, 1973, DG)
- Penderecki, Die Teufel von Loudun – Jeanne (Janowski, 1969, DG)
- Purcell, Dido and Aeneas – Dido (Mackerras, 1967, DG Archiv)
- Purcell, Dido and Aeneas – Dido (Leppard, 1977, Erato/Apex)
- Scarlatti, A., Endimione e Cintia – Cintia (Lange, 1969, DG Archiv)
- Schoenberg, Gurre-Lieder – Wood Dove (Ozawa, 1979, Philips)
- Strauss, Ariadne auf Naxos – Composer (Böhm, live 1967, Melodram)
- Strauss, Ariadne auf Naxos – Composer (Böhm, 1969, DG)
- Strauss, Ariadne auf Naxos – Composer (Solti, 1977, Decca/London)
- Strauss, Capriccio – Clairon (Böhm, 1971, DG)
- Strauss, Der Rosenkavalier – Octavian (Böhm, live 1969, DG)
- Stravinsky, Oedipus Rex – Jocasta (Abbado, live 1969, Opera d'Oro/Memories)
- Stravinsky, Oedipus Rex – Jocasta (Bernstein, 1972, Columbia/Sony)
- Wagner, Götterdämmerung – Second Norn (Levine, 1989, DG)
- Auger, Janowitz and Troyanos in Concert – Handel, Mozart, Strauss (Eichhorn, live 1968, Originals/Bella Voce)
- Troyanos and Valente – Handel and Mozart, Arias & Duets (Rudel, 1991, MusicMasters/Musical Heritage)
- A Salute to American Music, Richard Tucker Music Foundation Gala XVI – Copland, "At the River" (Conlon, 1991, RCA/BMG)
- Tatiana Troyanos in Recital – Schumann, "Frauenliebe und -leben"; Rachmaninoff, Four Songs; Ravel, "Five Greek Folksongs"; Rossini, "La Regata Veneziana" (Levine, piano, live 1985, VAI, released 1999)

There are DVDs of 10 complete operas featuring Troyanos:

- Jeanne – Die Teufel von Loudun, Penderecki (Janowski, 1969)
- Santuzza – Cavalleria rusticana, Mascagni (Levine, 1978)
- Eboli – Don Carlo, Verdi (Levine, 1980)
- Sesto – La Clemenza di Tito, Mozart (Levine, 1980)
- Adalgisa – Norma, Bellini (Bonynge, 1981)
- Octavian – Der Rosenkavalier, R. Strauss (Levine, 1982)
- Venus – Tannhäuser, Wagner (Levine, 1982)
- Didon/ Cassandre – Les Troyens, Berlioz (Levine, 1983 and 1984)
- Composer – Ariadne auf Naxos, R. Strauss (Levine, 1988)
- Clairon – Capriccio, R. Strauss (Runnicles, 1993)

There are also on DVD:

- In Concert At The Met with Plácido Domingo (Levine, 1982)
- The Making of West Side Story (Bernstein, 1985)
- George London: A Tribute: Mozart, "Deh, per questo istante" (Hollreiser, 1984)
- The Unanswered Question: Poetry of Earth (6): Stravinsky, Oedipus Rex – Jocasta (Bernstein, 1972)

== Other voices ==
Soprano Benita Valente provided a unique glimpse of Troyanos as working musician. "I don't know any singer who spent as much time in depth with the music," Valente said. "I don't think she even knew what a stamp she put on each role. She didn't talk about this. But we spent a lot of time working on our recitals, and when I was in her New York apartment, just seeing the music on the piano was a revelation." The scores were "covered with instructions to herself ... words and signs in a big, bold slanted hand" filling "every margin and possible space ... It was like a diary in those scores", said Valente.

Mezzo-soprano Susan Graham recalled, "Once I started performing, I got quite acquainted with the art of Tatiana Troyanos, another artist from whom I learned 100% commitment." Early in her career, Graham sang Annio to Troyanos' Sesto in La clemenza di Tito. Preparing Sesto herself years later, "I went back to my Clemenza score and opened it up, and the smell of the paper reminded me of Tatiana. Isn't that weird? And seeing certain phrases, I can still hear her voice in my head. It's not that we were that close. But I was so impacted by her performance and the power of being on stage with her, that just looking at the score and remembering the Annio/Sesto duet, I can still hear that voice in my ear, the way she sang certain phrases of recit."

"When I did my first Sesto ... there were certain phrases that I found myself singing just like she did, because it was in my ear that way," said Graham. "I was never so inspired by a colleague on the stage as I was by Tatiana, because she just gave everything."

Mezzo-soprano Joyce DiDonato confessed that during the time before the role of the Composer in Ariadne auf Naxos ultimately "clicked" for her, "my preparation for Strauss's naïve Komponist seemed to be way too slow. I had also been listening to the consummate artist, Tatiana Troyanos, a great deal, and I was thinking, 'I just can't do this role justice. I won't be ready. I just can't sing it like her.'"

== Final season ==
Troyanos died on August 21, 1993, in New York, at the age of 54, of cancer. Nine years after her death, Opera News identified this as breast cancer, initially diagnosed in the mid-1980s and later in remission, which was found only in July 1993 to have metastasized to her liver. Her earlier cancer diagnosis had been undisclosed at the time; the Opera News article, by Eric Myers, now reported that "through all her treatments, she valiantly, strenuously battled illness and nerves and kept most of her singing engagements." She was survived by her mother, Hildegard Fournier, and a brother. She was interred in Pinelawn Memorial Park, Long Island, New York. The year after her death, the Metropolitan Opera performed a concert in her memory; Music Director James Levine wrote, "The idea that we are gathered here ... to pay memorial tribute to Tatiana Troyanos is incomprehensible. What it means, of course, is that our Metropolitan Opera family has lost one of the most important, beloved artists and friends in its entire history."

Although described as "an exceedingly private person offstage," Troyanos had become known increasingly to suffer from inner ear and sinus problems, along with severe performance anxiety (Opera magazine said she was, "by all reports, someone caught between a rock and a hard place: her stage fright was equalled only by her love of singing"). Her death, however, was unforeseen and "came as a shock to the close-knit opera community," as Tim Page wrote at the time. "Ms. Troyanos had kept her illness to herself and continued to perform almost to the end."

She had last sung at the Met—the last of three performances of Waltraute (a role debut) to Gwyneth Jones' Brünnhilde in Wagner's Götterdämmerung, conducted by Levine—on May 1, 1993. That April and May, she also sang in Mahler's Third Symphony with the Boston Symphony Orchestra in both Boston and New York, one of three prominent singers who came to the rescue when the scheduled soloist withdrew from the series of concerts. "Troyanos is still a profoundly immediate and expressive artist," wrote Richard Dyer in the Boston Globe, adding that "hers was the most pliant and meaningful delivery and coloration of the text, the most beautiful, sophisticated and natural shaping of the musical line." James Oestreich in The New York Times reported that "Troyanos offered a searching, almost harrowing reading."

Troyanos was scheduled to reprise the Mahler Third at Tanglewood in August, but her final stage appearances were in a somewhat lighter vein, as the actress Clairon in Richard Strauss' Capriccio at San Francisco Opera between June 12 and July 1, 1993. She had fallen ill during rehearsals but sang all the performances, and Joseph McLellan of the Washington Post recalled that the revival was "highlighted not only by the radiant presence of Kiri Te Kanawa but by the deceptively robust performance of Tatiana Troyanos." Taking part in a Strauss symposium in San Francisco "a short two months before she died, she was the most blooming and healthy-looking presence in the room," wrote Leighton Kerner in the Village Voice.

Daniel Kessler observed that "beneath the veneer of the casualness of her Clairon for San Francisco on those late 1993 Spring evenings, with each performance she gave, there was a conscious endeavor to build or perfect over what had gone before."

Troyanos last sang on the last day of her life, in Lenox Hill Hospital for other patients, one of whom "told her that this was the first time in three years that she had completely forgotten her pain."
