= Igor Buketoff =

American conductor, arranger and teacher (1915–2001)

Igor Konstantin Buketoff (29 May 1915 – 7 September 2001) was an American conductor, arranger and teacher. He had a special affinity with Russian classical music and with Sergei Rachmaninoff in particular. He also strongly promoted British contemporary music, and new music in general.

== Biography ==
Buketoff was born in Hartford, Connecticut on 29 May 1915, the son of a Russian Orthodox priest. He liked to refer to himself as "the last active conductor with pre-Revolutionary blood in his veins". His father knew Sergei Rachmaninoff and had been asked by the composer to assemble the choir for the 1927 world premiere of his Three Russian Folk Songs, Op. 41, using the basso profundos among the Orthodox clergy. Igor attended the rehearsals for the premiere and was told by his father that the conductor, Leopold Stokowski, had his own ideas about the tempo for the final song and refused to obey Rachmaninoff's wishes.

His education was at the University of Kansas 1931-32, the Juilliard School in New York 1935-41, and the Los Angeles Conservatory of Music. His sister, Ludmilla Buketoff Turkevich, also attended the University of Kansas. He taught at the Conservatory, and at Juilliard 1935-45. He directed the choral departments at Juilliard and Adelphi College.

At Juilliard he programmed Rachmaninoff's Three Russian Folk Songs, and remembering what had happened with the 1927 premiere, he consulted the composer about the tempo to be used in the final song. He also recorded the work commercially. In 1940 he contributed a scholarly article on Russian chant to Gustave Reese's Music in the Middle Ages.

From 1941 to 1947 he was Music Director of the Chautauqua Opera Association and taught at Columbia University 1941-47. In 1941 he won the first Ditson Conductor's Award. In the early part of his career he conducted a range of orchestras in the United States, which included the New York Philharmonic in the Young People's Concerts 1948-53, the Philadelphia Orchestra, and the Fort Wayne Philharmonic Orchestra 1948-66. He taught at Butler University 1953-63 and was later associated with the Festival of Neglected Romantic Music held there.

In 1959, Buketoff established the World Music Bank for International Exchange and Promotion of Contemporary Music, for which participating countries were asked to nominate outstanding scores. The organization is now called the International Contemporary Music Exchange and is managed by the International Rostrum of Composers. He won the Ditson Award again in 1967.

He was conductor of the Iceland Symphony Orchestra 1964-66 and also conducted internationally. He was Director of the Contemporary Composers Project for the Institute of International Education 1967-70.

In 1971, Buketoff conducted the world premiere of Lee Hoiby's opera Summer and Smoke with St Paul Opera, Minnesota. With that organisation he also led the U.S. premieres of Carl Nielsen's Maskarade and Werner Egk's Betrothal in San Domingo.

At Eugene Ormandy's request, he reconstructed Tchaikovsky's 1812 Overture, setting the opening section for a cappella chorus, in the style of a Russian Orthodox chant, and the finale for chorus and orchestra. He recorded this version with the New Philharmonia Orchestra.

He taught at the University of Houston from 1977 to 1979 and conducted the Texas Chamber Orchestra in Houston during the 1980–1981 season.

At the request of Sophie Satin, Rachmaninoff's sister-in-law, Igor Buketoff orchestrated Act I of Rachmaninoff's unfinished opera Monna Vanna, which was premiered in a concert performance at Saratoga Springs, New York, on 11 August 1984, with the Philadelphia Orchestra. Rachmaninoff had written this act in piano score, as well as some uncompleted sketches for Act II. The soloists were Sherrill Milnes and Tatiana Troyanos. Buketoff also recorded the work with the Iceland Symphony Orchestra, again with Sherrill Milnes, but other singers sang the other roles.

He also produced a new version of Modest Mussorgsky's Boris Godunov in which he removed most of Rimsky-Korsakov's additions and reorchestrations, and fleshed out some other parts of Mussorgsky's original orchestration. This version had its first performance at the Metropolitan Opera, New York, in 1997, under Valery Gergiev.

He also prepared a version of Delius's opera A Village Romeo and Juliet, with reduced orchestration.

The Los Angeles Conservatory awarded him an Honorary Doctorate.

In his later years Igor Buketoff lived in Manhattan. He didn't follow the Eastern Orthodox tradition of his family; he was a lifetime member at St. James' Episcopal Church (New York City). He died in the Bronx on 7 September 2001, aged 86, survived by his wife and a daughter.

== Recordings ==
Buketoff was known for the unusual repertoire he chose to record. These (counting studio and radio recordings) included:

- Jacob Avshalomov's The Taking of T'ung Kuan, with the Oslo Philharmonic
- Sir Arnold Bax's Overture to a Picaresque Comedy (first recording)
- Sir Richard Rodney Bennett's Symphony No. 1 with the Royal Philharmonic Orchestra (RPO)
- Sir Lennox Berkeley's Divertimento in B-flat (RPO)
- Luboš Fišer's Fifteen Prints After Dürer's "Apocalypse", with the London Symphony Orchestra (LSO)
- Alexandre Guilmant's Symphony No. 1 for Organ and Orchestra in D minor, with the Butler University Symphony Orchestra (1977, live recording; a revival of a work that had not been played since the 1930s)
- works by Louis Moreau Gottschalk, with the Vienna State Opera Orchestra (all world premiere recordings except the Grande Tarantelle)
  - Escenas Campestres (Cuban Country Scenes), one-act opera
  - Symphony No. 1 La Nuit des tropiques (original orchestration)
  - Symphony No. 2 A Montevideo (original version)
  - Samuel Adler's arrangement for piano and orchestra of The Union, Op. 48, with Eugene List
  - Variations on the Brazilian National Hymn, original version (with List)
  - Grande Tarantelle for piano and orchestra (with List)
- Jan Klusák's First Invention (LSO)
- Benjamin Lees's Concerto for String Quartet and Orchestra
- Anatoly Lyadov's From the Apocalypse (Butler U.)
- Peter Mennin's Piano Concerto, with John Ogdon and the RPO
- Sergei Rachmaninoff's Piano Concerto No. 4 (first recording of the second (1927) version, with William Black and the Iceland Symphony Orchestra)
- Ferdinand Ries's Violin Concerto No. 1 in E minor (Op.24) (Aaron Rosand and Butler U.)
- Roger Sessions' Symphony No. 3
- Christian Sinding's Rondo Infinito (Butler U.)
- Vladimír Sommer's Vocal Symphony (LSO)
- Robert Ward's Symphonies Nos. 3 and 6
- Richard Yardumian's Passacaglia, Recitative and Fugue for piano and orchestra (with John Ogdon and the RPO).
