= Institute of World Affairs =

Swiss Institute

The Institute of World Affairs (IWA) was founded 1924 in Geneva, Switzerland, by Maude Miner Hadden and Alexander Mectier Hadden. The IWA started at the Student's International Union (SIU) in Geneva. The SIU had been established at the League of Nations during its 5th assembly, and the creation of the SIU was at the bequest of students at the nearby university of Geneva and an idea by Gilbert Murray. The IWA, in time, would grow to not only have the office in Geneva, but also have offices in New York City, Washington, D.C., and Salisbury, Connecticut. In 1941, due to the outbreak of World War II, the IWA was moved to the United States because of security concerns.

== Foundation ==
Maude and Alexander Hadden, met when the two of them founded the institution. Alexander was son to a well off family, whose father did not wish for him to go to college. Alexander did end up going to college, funded his education at Columbia University by “saving his allowance and depriving himself of luxuries.” Alexander had met Maude through his social work.

Maude and Alexander had met two university students who were also interested in world affairs. The students were very interested in world peace and security, but they had no structure to understand the very issues they were so interested in. At this point the Hadden’s ended their honeymoon, and they returned to New York and began working on creating an International organization for students. The organization would become the IWA, and it would set out to give students experience and understanding of world politics. The IWA would end up becoming part of the Hadden’s legacy after their deaths in the early and mid-1900s, and in 1994 the IWA merged, in-part, with the Institute of Current World Affairs (ICWA). In-line with the mission of the IWA the ICWA site, “fostering understanding of the world by immersing promising individuals in the study of a country, region, or globally important issue and by sharing the benefits of their knowledge with society”, as their mission statement.

== Goals ==
The school of thought of both the IWA and ICWA are mirrored. Although the IWA was geared more towards conflict resolution, conflict management, and post-conflict peacebuilding and the ICWA is more non-conflict oriented –as they do not send fellows to war zones or places where security is a concern--, both are designed to give real world knowledge to the students.

== Supporting government agencies ==
The governmental agencies which fund them in part. The list includes U.S. Joint Forces Command, Canadian Department of National Defence, North Atlantic Treaty Organization, Federal Department of Foreign Affairs - Government of Switzerland, U.S. Agency for International Development, National Endowment for Democracy, and the U.S. Institute of Peace.
