= Kevin Short (bass-baritone) =

American operatic bass-baritone

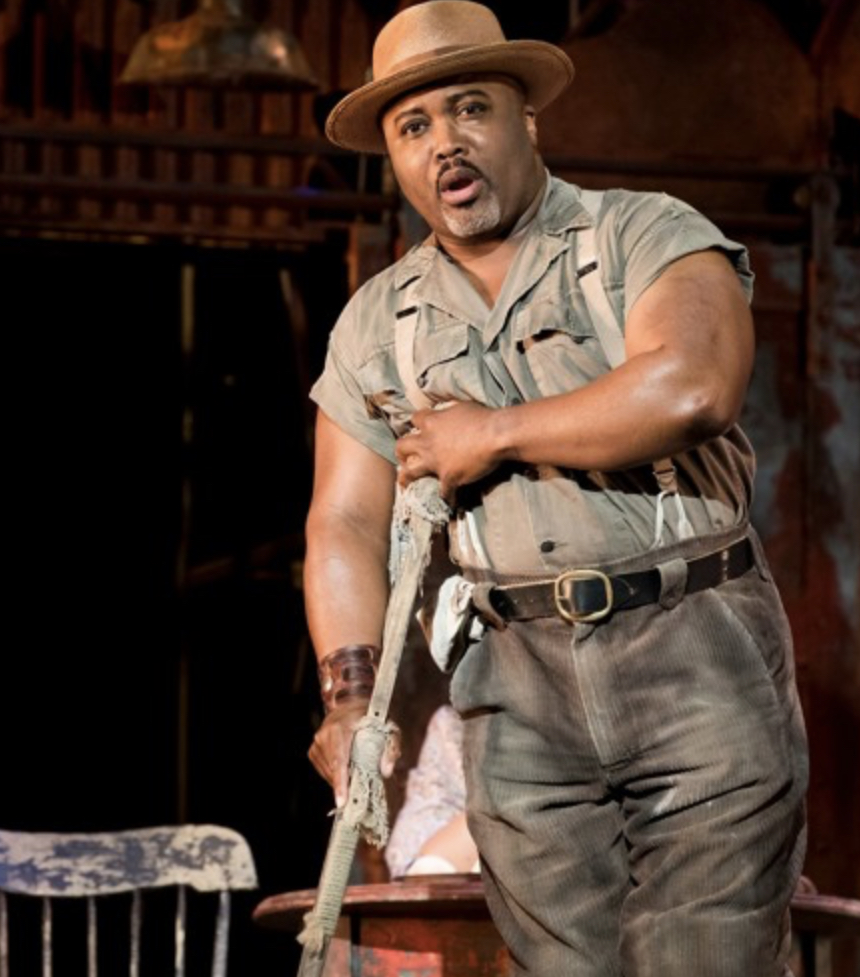
Kevin Short in Porgy and Bess at Seattle Opera

Kevin Short is an American operatic bass-baritone. A graduate of Morgan State University, the Curtis Institute of Music, and the Juilliard School, he won the bass-baritone award for the Middle Atlantic region Metropolitan Opera National Council Auditions in 1989. Since 1991 he sang at the Metropolitan Opera, appearing in more than 200 performances. He notably created the role of Joseph in the world premiere of John Corigliano's The Ghosts of Versailles in 1991. Some of the other roles he has performed at the Met are Colline in La bohème, the Friar in Don Carlos, Happy in La fanciulla del West, the Jailer in Dialogues of the Carmelites, Lackey in Ariadne auf Naxos, Mandarin in Turandot, Masetto in Don Giovanni, Sciarrone in Tosca, Pirro in I Lombardi alla prima crociata, Yamadori in Madama Butterfly, and Zaretsky in Eugene Onegin. He also sang several roles with the New York City Opera during the 1980s and 1990s, including Nourabad in Les pêcheurs de perles and Raimondo in Lucia di Lammermoor.

Since the late 1990s, Short has worked actively with opera houses internationally. From 2001 to 2004 he was a member of Theater Basel, singing such roles as Landgrave in Tannhäuser, Mephistopheles in Faust, Oroveso in Norma, Sarastro in The Magic Flute, Seneca in L'incoronazione di Poppea, and Simone in Gianni Schicchi. In 2003 he made his debut at the Vienna Volksoper as Leporello in Don Giovanni. He appeared in the original production of William Bolcom's A Wedding at the Lyric Opera of Chicago in January 2005. He has also appeared as a guest artist with the Bern Theatre, the Canadian Opera Company, Houston Grand Opera, Indianapolis Opera, Los Angeles Opera, the Michigan Opera Theatre, the Opera Company of Philadelphia, Opera Omaha, Opera Pacific, the Opera Theatre of Saint Louis, Santa Fe Opera, Sarasota Opera, Seattle Opera, Vancouver Opera, Washington National Opera, and Zurich Opera among others.
