= Sherrill Milnes =

American opera singer (born 1935)

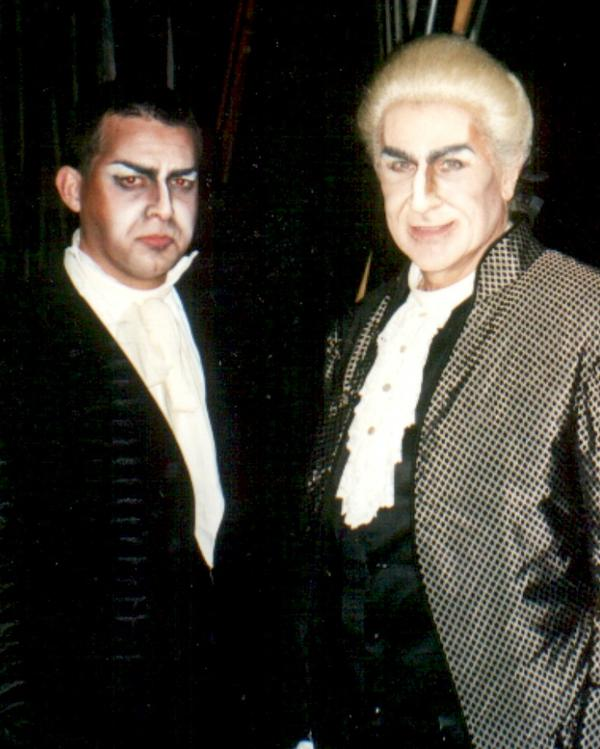
- Sherrill Milnes (right) as Scarpia in Tosca (Festival Puccini, 1997)
- Born: January 10, 1935 (age 91); Downers Grove, Illinois, U.S.
- Occupation: Operatic baritone
- Spouse: Maria Zouves
- Children: 1

Sherrill Milnes (born January 10, 1935) is an American dramatic baritone most famous for his Verdi roles. From 1965 until 1997 he was associated with the Metropolitan Opera. His voice is a high dramatic baritone, combining good legato with an incisive rhythmic style.

By 1965, aged 30, he had made his debut at the Metropolitan Opera. His international debuts followed soon thereafter, and Milnes became one of the world's prominent Verdi baritones of the 1970s and 1980s.

== Early life ==
Milnes was born in Downers Grove, Illinois. His mother and father were dairy farmers. As a child, he exhibited strong and varied musical talents. In addition to singing, he also played piano, violin, viola, double bass, clarinet, and tuba. Although his interests did not always lean toward opera, he spent many hours singing to his father's cows and was once found on a tractor practicing an operatic laugh.

While in high school, Milnes planned to be an anesthesiologist, but later returned to music, studying music education at Drake University and Northwestern University, with the idea of becoming a teacher. He attended North Central College before transferring to Drake University and Northwestern University.

From 1958 until 1963, he was a member of the Chicago Symphony Chorus under the direction of Margaret Hillis, performing several times under the baton of the Chicago Symphony Orchestra's sixth music director, Fritz Reiner. After graduating from Drake, he spent a summer as an apprentice at the Santa Fe Opera and thereafter dedicated himself to becoming an opera singer, studying briefly with the famed soprano Rosa Ponselle.

Milnes was awarded an honorary doctorate from North Central College in 2006.

== Career ==
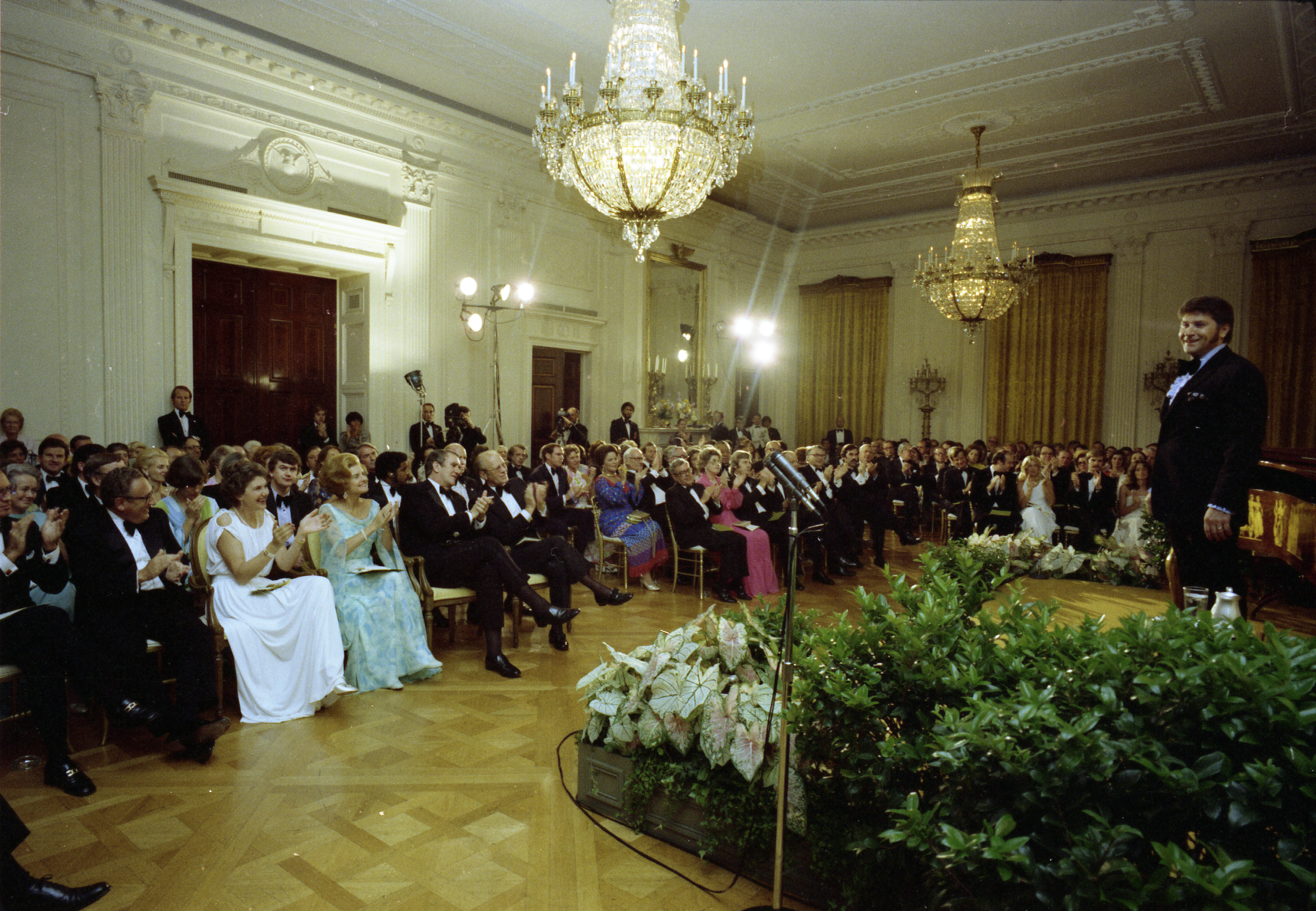
Sherrill Milnes Receiving Applause from the Audience following His Performance during a State Dinner Honoring Prime Minister Malcolm Fraser of Australia

Milnes began his career with the Opera Company of Boston in 1960, joining Boris Goldovsky's Opera Theater, and debuting as Masetto in Don Giovanni. From very early on in his career, Milnes was managed by well-known talent manager Herbert Barrett. In 1961, he made his debut at Ponselle's Baltimore Opera as Gérard in Andrea Chénier.

In 1964, Milnes made his first major breakthrough singing the role of Valentin in Gounod's Faust at the New York City Opera (opposite Norman Treigle as Méphistophélès), the role with which he also made his Metropolitan Opera debut in 1965. In 1967 he created the role of Captain Adam Brant in the world premiere of Marvin David Levy's Mourning Becomes Electra at the Met.

In 1964, Milnes also made his European debut singing Figaro from The Barber of Seville at the Teatro Nuovo in Milan. However, it was his performance as Miller in Verdi's Luisa Miller in 1968 which catapulted him into international fame. Milnes was the leading baritone at the Met during the 1970s, singing to great acclaim there, especially for his performances in Verdi operas. Apart from Verdi, Milnes has also performed in bel canto works, most notably Riccardo in I Puritani, Enrico in Lucia di Lammermoor (which he sang opposite Placido Domingo's Edgardo in Mexico), and King Alfonso in La Favorita, as well as French dramatic baritone roles such as Escamillo in Carmen (which he sang at the Metropolitan Opera twice - in 1966 with Regina Resnik in the title role and James McCracken as Don Jose, and again in 1968 with Grace Bumbry in the title role and Nicolai Gedda as Don Jose), the High Priest in Samson et Dalila, and his Met debut, Valentin in Faust. Milnes occasionally drifted into verismo, such as Scarpia in Tosca, which he performed at the Met in 1981 (opposite Carol Neblett in the title role and Jose Carreras as Cavaradossi, and conducted by Giuseppe Patane), although his portrayals of these roles were not documented as much as his Verdi or bel canto repertory.

Beginning in 1982, Milnes experienced sudden serious vocal health problems which took him some time to surmount. In 1984, he sang in the world premiere of Act I of Sergei Rachmaninoff's opera Monna Vanna, which had been left in piano score by the composer and orchestrated by Igor Buketoff.

Milnes' talents were not confined, however, solely to the stage. As early as 1971 he had already received critical acclaim while featured in the role of David during the premier of Ezra Laderman's opera And David Wept, on the CBS Television network, under the musical direction of Alfredo Antonini. Nearly a decade earlier in 1964 he also collaborated with Antonini, playing the role of Saint Joseph in a televised adaptation of Hector Berlioz's sacred oratorio L'enfance du Christ.

Milnes was awarded Phi Mu Alpha Sinfonia fraternity's Charles E. Lutton Man of Music Award at its 1982 national convention in Urbana, Illinois. He had been initiated into the Fraternity's Alpha Beta chapter at Drake University in 1954. In the same year was honored by the Italian government as "Commendatore Ordine al Merito della Repubblica"

On July 5, 1986, he performed on the New York Philharmonic's tribute to the 100th anniversary of the Statue of Liberty, which was televised live by ABC. The orchestra, conducted by Zubin Mehta, performed in Central Park.

In September 1996, Milnes was honored by the French government with the distinguished Chevalier de l'Ordre des Arts et des Lettres. After 32 years and 653 performances, he made his final appearance at the Metropolitan on March 22, 1997 as Amonasro in Aida.

In 1998, Milnes published a memoir, American Aria.

Milnes is currently a professor emeritus in voice at Northwestern University. He is a recipient of Yale University's Sanford Medal.

Milnes was inducted as a Laureate of The Lincoln Academy of Illinois and awarded the Order of Lincoln (the State’s highest honor) by the Governor of Illinois in 2003 in the area of The Performing Arts.

Milnes has been a resident of Cresskill, New Jersey, and currently resides in Palm Harbor, Florida with his wife and son, Theo.

== VOICExperience Foundation ==
In 2001, Milnes and his wife, soprano Maria Zouves, founded the VOICExperience Foundation, a non-profit organization for the education of young singers. It evolved from a series of master classes led by Milnes, Tony Randall, Martina Arroyo and Barry Tucker, president of the Richard Tucker Music Foundation. Based in Florida, it provides several educational programs, workshops, outreach events and community enrichment programs. In Florida, the foundation runs The Florida VOICE Project for singers in the Tampa Bay Area. In New York City, the foundation runs the Opera As Drama program, a week-long career development program for emerging professional opera singers which culminates in a public performance at Opera America's National Opera Center. As part of the Savannah Voice Festival, the foundation runs a Teen VOICE workshop and the Milnes VOICE studio.

== Repertoire ==
Repertoire
Role	Opera	Composer
Don Fernando	Fidelio	Beethoven
Riccardo	I puritani	Bellini
Escamillo	Carmen	Bizet
Michonnet	Adriana Lecouvreur	Cilea
Alfonso	La Favorita	Donizetti
Enrico Ashton	Lucia di Lammermoor	Donizetti
Gérard	Andrea Chénier	Giordano
De Siriex	Fedora	Giordano
Valentin	Faust	Gounod
Tonio	Pagliacci	Leoncavallo
Captain Adam Brant	Mourning Becomes Electra	Levy
Alfio	Cavalleria rusticana	Mascagni
Scindia	Le roi de Lahore	Massenet
Athanaël	Thaïs	Massenet
Garrido	La Navarraise	Massenet
Nèlusko	L'Africaine	Meyerbeer
Buff	Der Schauspieldirektor	Mozart
Don Giovanni	Don Giovanni	Mozart
Guglielmo	Così fan tutte	Mozart
Barnaba	La Gioconda	Ponchielli
Lescaut	Manon Lescaut	Puccini
Marcello	La bohème	Puccini
Il barone Scarpia	Tosca	Puccini
Jack Rance	La fanciulla del West	Puccini
Michele	Il tabarro	Puccini
Gianni Schicchi	Gianni Schicchi	Puccini
Guido	Monna Vanna	Rachmaninoff
Figaro	The Barber of Seville	Rossini
Guglielmo Tell	William Tell	Rossini
High Priest	Samson et Dalila	Saint-Saëns
Henry VIII	Henry VIII	Saint-Saëns
Jochanaan	Salome	Strauss
Eugene Onegin	Eugene Onegin	Tchaikovsky
Prince Yeletsky	The Queen of Spades	Tchaikovsky
Hamlet	Hamlet	Thomas
Nabucco	Nabucco	Verdi
Carlo V	Ernani	Verdi
Giacomo	Giovanna d'Arco	Verdi
Ezio	Attila	Verdi
Macbeth	Macbeth	Verdi
Miller	Luisa Miller	Verdi
Rigoletto	Rigoletto	Verdi
Conte di Luna	Il trovatore	Verdi
Giorgio Germont	La traviata	Verdi
Guido di Monforte	I vespri siciliani	Verdi
Simon Boccanegra; Paolo	Simon Boccanegra	Verdi
Renato	Un ballo in maschera	Verdi
Don Carlo	La forza del destino	Verdi
Rodrigo di Posa	Don Carlos	Verdi
Amonasro	Aida	Verdi
Jago	Otello	Verdi
Falstaff	Falstaff	Verdi
Wolfram	Tannhäuser	Wagner
Herald	Lohengrin	Wagner
Donner	Das Rheingold	Wagner
Lysiart	Euryanthe	Weber
Conte di Westmoreland	Sly	Wolf-Ferrari

== Discography ==
=== Complete Operas and other works ===
1967

- Mozart: Così fan tutte (with L. Price, Troyanos, Raskin, Shirley, Flagello – Leinsdorf, cond.)
- Verdi: La traviata (with Caballé, Bergonzi – Prêtre, cond.)

1968

- R. Strauss: Salome (with Caballé, R. Lewis, Resnik, J. King – Leinsdorf, cond.)

1969

- Beethoven: Symphony No. 9, "Choral" (with J. Marsh, Veasey, Domingo – Leinsdorf, cond.)
- Orff: Carmina Burana (with Mandac, Kolk – Ozawa, cond.)
- Verdi: Il trovatore (with L. Price, Domingo, Cossotto – Mehta, cond.)

1970

- Verdi: Aïda (with L. Price, Domingo, Bumbry, Raimondi – Leinsdorf, cond.)
- Verdi: Macbeth (with Ludwig, Cossutta – Böhm, cond.) Live recording

1971

- Verdi: Un ballo in maschera (with Tebaldi, Pavarotti—Bartoletti, cond.)
- Puccini: Il tabarro (with L. Price, Domingo—Leinsdorf, cond.)
- Verdi: Don Carlo (with Domingo, Caballé, Raimondi, Verrett—Giulini, cond.)
- Donizetti: Lucia di Lammermoor (with Sutherland, Pavarotti, Ghiaurov—Bonynge, cond.)
- Leoncavallo: Pagliacci (with Domingo, Caballé, Goeke-Santi, cond.)
- Verdi: Rigoletto (with Sutherland, Pavarotti, Tourangeau, Talvela—Bonynge, cond.)

1972

- Verdi: Attila (with Raimondi, Deutekom, Bergonzi—Gardelli, cond.)
- Verdi: Giovanna d'Arco (with Caballé, Domingo—Levine, cond.)

1973

- Puccini: Tosca (with L. Price, Domingo – Mehta, cond.)

1974

- Puccini: La bohème (with Caballé, Domingo, Blegen, Sardinero, Raimondi – Solti, cond.)
- Verdi: I vespri siciliani (with Arroyo, Domingo, Raimondi – Levine, cond.)

1975

- Rossini: Il barbiere di Siviglia (with Sills, Gedda, Capecchi, Raimondi, Barbieri – Levine, cond.)
- Verdi: Luisa Miller (with Pavarotti, Caballé – Maag, cond.)
- Massenet's La Navarraise (with Horne, Domingo, Bacquier – H. Lewis, cond.)
- Verdi: Il trovatore [with bonus tracks from a 1968 recording of Act II with Richard Tucker] (with Caballé, Cossutta, Arkhipova – Guadagno, cond.)

1976

- Giordano: Andrea Chénier (with Scotto, Domingo – Levine, cond.)
- Verdi: Macbeth (with Cossotto, Carreras, Raimondi – Muti, cond.)
- Massenet: Thaïs (with Sills, Gedda, van Allan – Maazel, cond.)

1977

- Cilea: Adriana Lecouvreur (with Scotto, Domingo, Obraztsova – Levine, cond.)
- Bizet: Carmen (with Berganza, Domingo, Cotrubas – C. Abbado, cond.)
- Puccini: La fanciulla del West (with Neblett, Domingo – Mehta, cond.)
- Verdi: La forza del destino (with L. Price, Domingo, Cossotto, Giaiotti, Bacquier – Levine, cond.)
- Verdi: La traviata (with Cotrubas, Domingo – Kleiber, cond.)
- Walton: Belshazzar's Feast (Gibson, cond.)

1978

- Rossini: Guglielmo Tell (with Freni, Pavarotti, Mazzoli, Jones, Ghiaurov – Chailly, cond.)
- Verdi: Otello (with Domingo, Scotto – Levine, cond.)
- Verdi: Rigoletto (with Sills, Kraus, M. Dunn, Ramey – Rudel, cond.)
- Puccini: Tosca (with Freni, Pavarotti – Rescigno, cond.)

1979

- Puccini: La bohème (with Scotto, Neblett, Kraus, Manuguerra, Plishka, Tajo; Levine, cond.)

1980

- Massenet: Le roi de Lahore (with Sutherland, Lima, Ghiaurov, Morris, Tourangeau – Bonynge, cond.)

1981

- Ponchielli: La Gioconda (with Caballé, Baltsa, Pavarotti, Ghiaurov – Bartoletti, cond.)

1983

- Thomas: Hamlet (with Sutherland, Morris, Conrad, Winbergh, Lewis, Gelling; Bonynge, cond.)

1986

- Ponchielli: La Gioconda (with Marton, Ramey, Lamberti – Patanè, cond.

1990

- Fauré: Requiem (with Te Kanawa – Dutoit, cond.)

2001

- Wolf-Ferrari: Sly (with Carreras, Kabatu – Gimenez, cond.)

=== Recitals ===
- Sherrill Milnes in Recital, Volume 1, "There but for You Go I" (Jon Spong, piano)
- Sherrill Milnes in Recital, Volume 2, "Kingdom by the Sea" (Jon Spong, piano)
- Met Legends: Sherrill Milnes
- Grandi Voci: Arias (de la Fuente, cond.)
- The Baritone Voice
- Great Operatic Duets (with Domingo)
- Domingo Conducts Milnes! - Milnes Conducts Domingo! (with Domingo)
- Sherrill Milnes - Arias
- Abide With Me
- The Church's One Foundation
- The America I Love
- Copland: Old American Songs
- Up In Central Park (with B. Sills, Rudel, cond.)
- Griffes: Four German Songs; Songs of the Dagger (Ozawa, cond.)
- A Salute to American Music (with L. Price, M. Horne, R. Merrill, et.al, Conlon, cond.)

=== DVDs ===
1976

- Puccini: Tosca (with Kabaivanska, Domingo – Bartoletti, cond., de Bosio, dir.)

1979

- Verdi: Luisa Miller (with Scotto, Domingo, Morris; Levine, cond., Merrill, dir.)

1980

- Verdi: Don Carlo (Scotto, Troyanos, Moldoveanu, Plishka, Hines; Levine, cond., Dexter, dir.)

1983

- Verdi: Ernani (with L. Mitchell, Pavarotti, Raimondi – Levine, cond., Samaritani, dir.)

1984

- Verdi: Simon Boccanegra (with Tomowa-Sintow, Moldoveanu, Plishka – Levine, cond., Capobianco, dir.)

1985

- Verdi: Nabucco (with Bumbry, Cortez, Raimondi – Santi, cond.)
- Sherrill Milnes: An All-Star Gala (various artists)

1986

- Sherrill Milnes at Juilliard: An Opera Master Class

1988

- Verdi: Il trovatore (with Marton, Zajick, Pavarotti – Levine, cond., Melano, dir.)

1989

- Verdi: Aïda (with Millo, Zajick, Domingo – Levine, cond., Frisell, dir.)

1991

- The Metropolitan Opera Gala 1991 - 25th Anniversary at Lincoln Center (various artists)

1992

- Puccini: La fanciulla del West (with Daniels, Domingo – Slatkin, cond., del Monaco, dir.)

1996

- James Levine's 25th Anniversary Metropolitan Opera Gala (various artists)

=== Audio Cassette Tapes ===
1979

- A Grand Night for Singing (with the Mormon Tabernacle Choir, Columbia Symphony & Jerold Ottley) — Published by CBS, Inc.
