= Mourning Becomes Electra (opera) =

Opera by Marvin David Levy

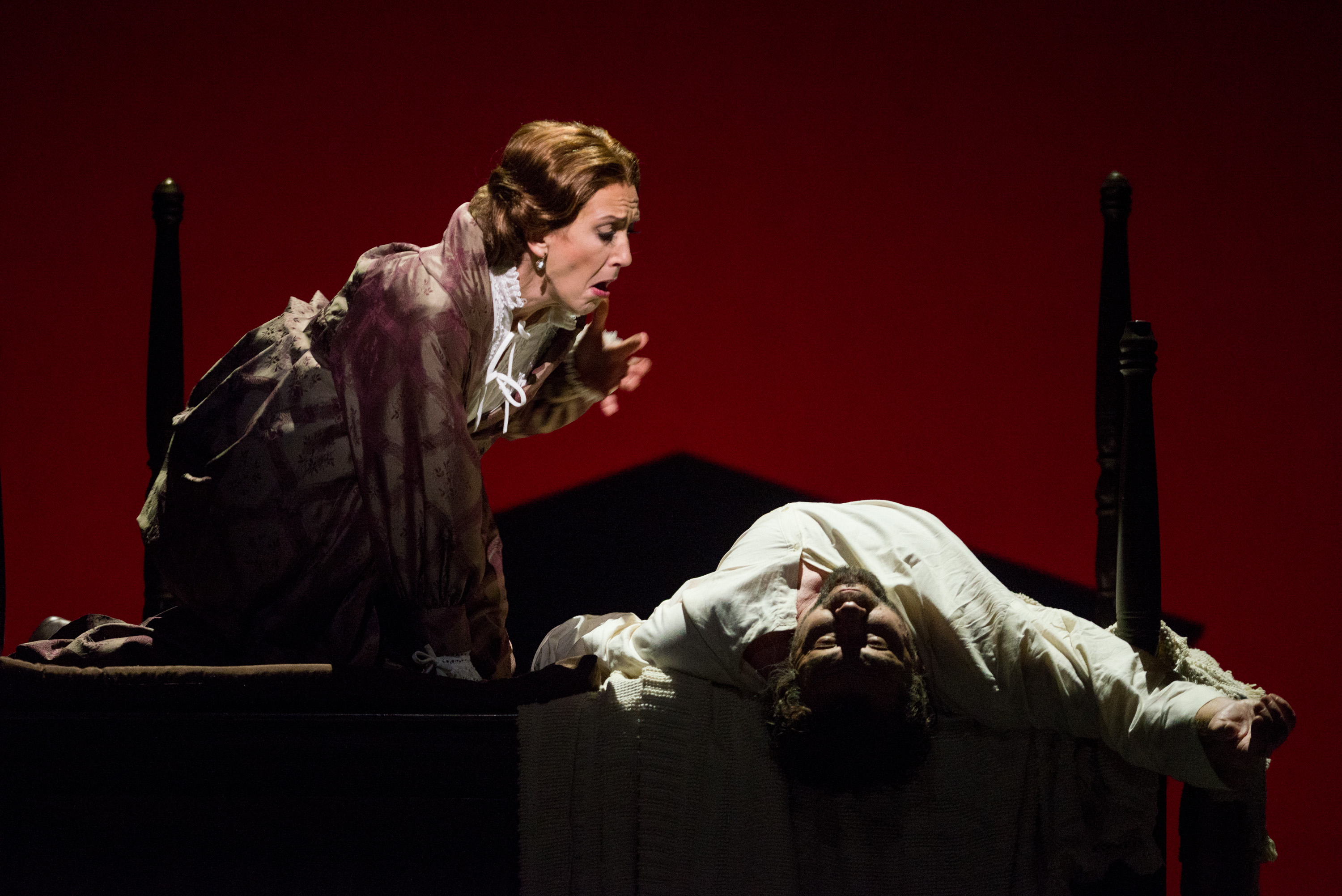
Scene from the 2013 Florida Grand Opera production

Mourning Becomes Electra is an opera in 3 acts by composer Marvin David Levy. The work uses an English language libretto by Henry W. Butler after the 1931 play of the same name by Eugene O'Neill.

It premiered at the Metropolitan Opera in New York City on March 17, 1967, with Zubin Mehta conducting. Michael Cacoyannis directed the production and Boris Aronson designed the sets, costumes, and lighting. The original production was critically well received, returned for a second season at the Met, and was presented successfully in Germany.

However, it then vanished from the stage. After thirty years, the opera was presented by Lyric Opera of Chicago in 1998 in a revised version that reduced the orchestration and simplified the harmonic language. A more drastic revision of the opera was subsequently premiered at the Seattle Opera on October 18, 2003. The orchestration was further cut down and electronic samplers added. A number of passages were re-written or omitted and a new finale was created. In addition, the opera was restructured from the original three acts (corresponding to the original O'Neill drama) into two. This version was subsequently mounted in 2004 at the New York City Opera . These more recent productions have been in general favorably received, not the least because of the performance in all of them of Lauren Flanigan as Christine Mannon. The Florida Grand Opera staged it in November 2013 in Miami and Ft. Lauderdale.

== Roles and premiere cast ==
- Christine Mannon...............Marie Collier
- Lavinia Mannon.................Evelyn Lear
- Orin Mannon....................John Reardon
- Captain Adam Brant.............Sherrill Milnes
- General Ezra Mannon............John Macurdy
- Captain Peter Niles............Ron Bottcher
- Helen Niles....................Lilian Sukis
- Jed............................Raymond Michalski
- Chorus of Soldiers, Servants, Townspeople, Sailors, Dockworkers, Fieldworkers
