= Lilith (opera) =

2001 opera by Deborah Drattell

Lilith is the first opera by American composer Deborah Drattell, with a libretto by David Steven Cohen. It was premiered in 2001 at the New York City Opera and was directed by Anne Bogart.

== Synopsis ==
The opera imagines Eve returning to Eden following the funeral of Adam. In the ruined paradise, she confronts Lilith, who in Jewish mythology and legends such as the medieval Alphabet of Sirach mated with Adam before Eve was created. Eve reveals the identity of Lilith. However, the opera ends with the women coming to an understanding of their roles and fates.

== History ==
Work on the opera began in 1986 when Drattell composed an 11-minute symphonic poem for the Denver Symphony when she was the organization’s artist-in-residence on the subject of Lilith. It was premiered with the New York Philharmonic in 1990.

The piece was expanded to a full-length opera, with a libretto by David Steven Cohen, due to Drattell's fascination with the theme. Its world première was initially planned for 1997 at New York’s Dicapo Opera, but production was cancelled due to a labor dispute. Drattell reworked the piece, presenting it as a workshop offering at the Glimmerglass Opera in Cooperstown, New York in 1998 as a concertized version. The full opera had its world première on November 11, 2001, at the New York City Opera with Lauren Flanigan as Eve.

== Cast ==
The opera featured a 16-member, all-male chorus with a main cast of Seer, Lilith, Eve, and Eve's son and daughter, along with nine mimes, five male and four female.

Role	Voice Type	2001 Premiere Cast
Lilith	Mezzo-soprano	Beth Clayton
Seer/Serpent		Tom Nelis
Eve	Soprano	Lauren Flanigan
Eve's son		Marcus DeLoach
Eve's daughter	Soprano	Dana Beth Miller
Mimes		
Chorus		

== Further links ==
- UC San Diego full broadcast
