= Mac Morgan =

American bass-baritone

- Born: June 25, 1917; Texarkana, Texas, U.S.
- Died: June 12, 2007 (aged 89); Carrollton, Georgia, U.S.
- Education: Eastman School of Music
- Occupation: Bass-baritone

Mac Morgan (June 25, 1917 – June 12, 2007) was an American bass-baritone who had an active performance career in concerts and operas from the early 1940s until the mid-1970s. The Boston Globe described him as a singer "known for his rich tone and enviable diction". After retiring from the stage, he embarked on a second successful career as a voice teacher.

== Early life and education ==
Born in Texarkana, Texas, Morgan moved with his family to Jacksonville, Florida at the age of 9. His father was a lease-inspector for federal buildings. His family attended the Main Street Baptist Church in Jacksonville, and it was there that he had his earliest singing experiences, both as a choir member and soloist. While in middle school he began playing the trombone, and at the age of 16 he began taking voice lessons. After finishing high school in Jacksonville, he entered the Eastman School of Music in 1936 on the advice of noted baritone John Charles Thomas. He graduated with a Bachelor of Music degree from Eastman in 1940. His voice teacher at Eastman, Arthur Craft, arranged for him to practice with the accompanist Helen Neilly. Neilly and Morgan married in 1941, and remained married until Morgan's death 66 years later. The couple had three daughters together.

== Early singing career ==
After his marriage, Morgan moved with his wife to New York City where he was soon signed with a talent manager. While performing on his first concert tour in 1942, he was drafted into the United States Army . He spent the next 3 1/2 years in military service during World War II in the South Pacific and Australia. He spent the majority of his time in the army working in the latter country as a full-time singer; performing in major cities throughout the continent.

After returning to the United States on January 8, 1946, Morgan resided with his family in Darien, Connecticut. In 1946 he began performing regularly on the New York City radio station WQXR with the Paul Lavalle Orchestra. He then was offered his own weekly show by NBC Radio, Highways in Melody, with Lavalle serving as music director and his orchestra accompanying. He commuted into NYC for performances on the show every Friday night at 8:00 at the pay of $130 a week. He also toured with the program for performances in Cleveland, Indianapolis, and Philadelphia among other American cities. In 1948 he performed selections from Jules Massenet's Hérodiade and Victor Herbert's Eileen with soprano Vivian Della Chiesa and Lavalle conducting the New York Philharmonic.

In the early 1950s Morgan and his family moved to Stockbridge, Massachusetts, and there he befriended the artist Norman Rockwell who did a charcoal drawing of Morgan which the singer used in publicity material. After moving to Massachusetts, he became a regular performer with the Boston Symphony Orchestra. With the BSO he performed under conductor Leonard Bernstein on several occasions, including 1955 performances of Ludwig van Beethoven's Missa Solemnis and Beethoven's Fidelio (as Rocco). Other engagements with major symphony orchestras soon followed, including performances with conductors Charles Munch, Erich Leinsdorf, and Seiji Ozawa. He was also frequently heard at the Tanglewood Music Festival, making his debut there in 1950 as Don Anchise in Wolfgang Amadeus Mozart's La finta giardiniera with Ray Smolover as Count Belfiore, Julian Patrick as Roberto, Marni Nixon as Serpetta, and Sarah Caldwell conducting.

In 1951 Morgan sang two roles with the New York City Opera: Pantalone in The Love for Three Oranges and Silvio in Pagliacci. Also that year he sang the role of Leporello in Mozart's Don Giovanni with Boris Goldovsky's New England Opera Theater. He was heard in succeeding years with that company as Figaro in The Barber of Seville (1952–1954), Podesta (1953), the title role in Don Pasquale (1955), and Guglielmo in Così fan tutte (1956). He sang the role of Sharpless in Giacomo Puccini's Madama Butterfly with the Opera Guild of Greater Miami in 1953 with Licia Albanese in the title role.

== Later singing career ==
In November 1955 Morgan celebrated the 200th anniversary of Mozart's birth singing Guglielmo in Così fan tutte with the San Antonio Symphony; reprising the role the following year in concert with the Pittsburgh Symphony Orchestra and in a fully staged production that toured the United States. The touring cast notably included Phyllis Curtin as Fiordiligi and David Lloyd as Ferrando. In 1958 he performed Guglielmo on a television broadcast of the opera made by the NBC Opera Theatre with John Alexander as Ferrando and Frances Bible as Dorabella. He had previously toured the United States with the NBC Opera Theatre in 1957–1958, singing Figaro in Mozart's The Marriage of Figaro with Peter Herman Adler conducting. He performed in another opera broadcast for NBC in 1961, the premiere of Leonard Kastle's Deseret. In April 1958 he gave a highly successful New York City recital debut at Town Hall with Paul Ulanowsky serving as his accompanist. In 1959 he performed in the United States premiere of Offenbach's Le Voyage dans la Lune with the Opera Company of Boston. That same year he recorded Igor Stravinsky's Threni for Columbia Records.

In 1962 Morgan sang Jochanaan in Richard Strauss' Salome with Thomas Schippers conducting the Montreal Symphony Orchestra. In 1963 he sang a duet opposite Joan Sutherland on The Bell Telephone Hour. On 19 January 1964 he was the bass soloist in Mozart's Requiem for the Solemn Requiem Mass honoring the death of President John F. Kennedy in Boston's Cathedral of the Holy Cross, celebrated by Richard Cardinal Cushing, the Archbishop of Boston, who had before presided Kennedy's funeral. In the mid-1960s his performance career began to slack as he began to shift towards a second career as a voice teacher. One of his last performances was as Rocco in the Opera Company of Boston's 1976 production of Fidelio.

== Teaching career and later life ==
Morgan began his teaching career in Boston during the early 1960s at the New England Conservatory. In 1962 he joined the music faculty of Boston University, where he was chairman of the voice department for 11 years. One of his notable students there was the soprano Lauren Flanigan. In 1982 he retired from Boston University and moved to Georgia, where he taught for 11 more years at Emory University. He lived in retirement in Carrollton, Georgia where he died of complications of an appendectomy at the age of 89.
