= Beth Clayton =

American opera singer

Laura Beth Clayton is an American mezzo-soprano opera singer, and a native of Malvern, Arkansas.

== Education and early career ==
Clayton's father was a Methodist minister. She sang in church and then in musical productions in church camp and in high school. Her first exposure to live opera, a Little Rock production of Dido and Aeneas, made her an instant fan.

Clayton is a graduate of Southern Methodist University and the Manhattan School of Music, where she studied with Mignon Dunn. She has been an apprentice artist for the Santa Fe Opera and a member of the Houston Grand Opera Studio.

== Awards and nominations ==
Clayton's awards include a William Matheus Sullivan Award. She was a finalist at the Metropolitan Opera National Council Auditions.

In the summer of 2003, Clayton sang the role of Rosalind in the first performances of Sir Richard Rodney Bennett's opera The Mines of Sulphur in 30 years. A recording was issued on the Chandos label and nominated for a 2007 Grammy Award. In 2008 Clayton created multiple roles (Officer/Medical Analyst/Cheevers) at the Théâtre du Châtelet in Howard Shore's opera The Fly.

== Critical reception ==
Justin Davidson, Pulitzer prize winner for criticism, said of Clayton's performance in the premiere of Deborah Drattell's Lilith at the New York State Theater in 2001: "Beth Clayton, making her debut with the company, slinked memorably through the title role, armed with a cloak of long, brown, shampoo-commercial hair, a fierce and glistening soprano and a shiny nightie."

== Personal life ==
Clayton is an out lesbian. She lives in Santa Fe and New York City with her long-time partner, opera soprano Patricia Racette. The couple met in 1997. That year they sang together in La traviata at the Santa Fe Opera. Clayton has expressed gratitude to Racette for not speaking publicly of their sexuality for several years: "My career was just getting started, and I thought, Gosh, I don't need that adjective. It felt like extra baggage just when I was establishing myself. But now I'm very proud to embrace it. It doesn't define my career by any means. It's validating. We're living our truth." In June 2002, when Patricia Racette was featured on the cover of Opera News, Racette requested that the magazine include her public coming-out statement. She stated that her sexuality and long-term relationship with Clayton were a very important part of her identity as an artist. Clayton participated in the interview as well. Clayton and Racette were married in 2005.
