= Monna Vanna =

Opera by Rachmaninoff

- Unfinished opera by Sergei Rachmaninoff
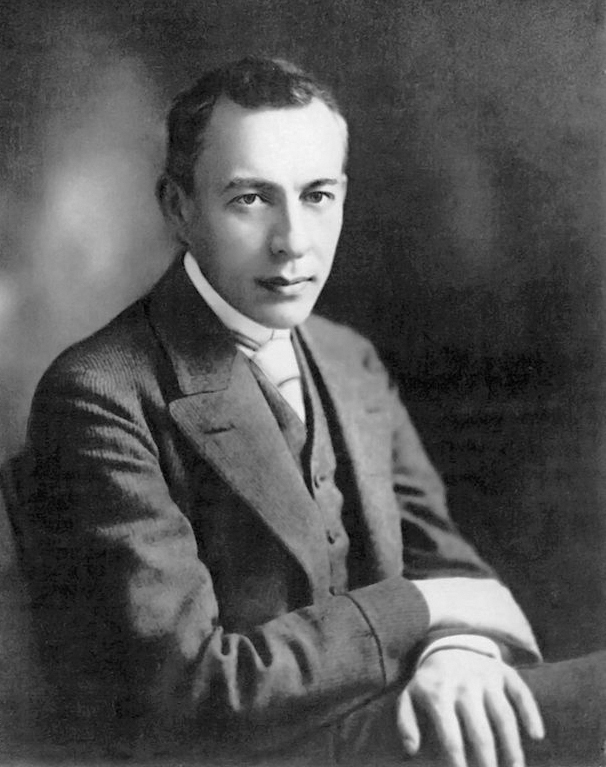
- Rachmaninoff in 1902
- Native title: Russian: Монна Ванна
- Librettist: Vladimir Nemirovich-Danchenko
- Language: Russian
- Based on: Play by Maurice Maeterlinck
- Premiere: 11 August 1984; Saratoga Springs, New York

Monna Vanna (Russian: Монна Ванна) is an unfinished opera by Sergei Rachmaninoff after a play by Maurice Maeterlinck. Rachmaninoff had completed Act I in short vocal score, with piano accompaniment, and then he went to ask for permission to set the text in a full three-act treatment. However, another composer, Henry Février, had by then received the rights to an operatic setting of the text. Had Rachmaninoff proceeded to a complete operatic setting, such a work could not have been produced in European countries that were signatories to copyright laws that covered the work of Maeterlinck. This opera could only have been produced in countries that at the time were not signatories to European copyright law, such as Russia. Ultimately, Rachmaninoff abandoned further work on this opera and never wrote a complete setting.

Years later, at the request of Sophie Satin, Rachmaninoff's sister-in-law, Igor Buketoff prepared a performing orchestrated edition of Act I, which he conducted in its world premiere with the Philadelphia Orchestra on 11 August 1984 at Saratoga Springs, New York with Tatiana Troyanos in the title role, Sherrill Milnes as Guido, and John Alexander as Guido's father. He also made the premiere recording of the work, with the Iceland Symphony Orchestra.

== Roles ==
Role	Voice type	Premiere cast Act I performed, 11 August 1984 (Conductor: Igor Buketoff)
Guido, military commander	baritone	Sherrill Milnes
Guido's father	tenor	John Alexander
Monna Vanna, wife of Guido	soprano	Tatiana Troyanos
Torello		
Borso		
Chorus (off stage)

== Synopsis ==
Time: 15th-century
Place: Pisa, Italy, during an armed conflict with the city under siege.

Act I is divided into three scenes.

Guido, the military commander in Pisa, learns from his father that the enemy will cease conflict if Monna Vanna, wife of Guido, goes to the enemy's camp, but dressed only in a mantle. Monna Vanna agrees to this demand.

== Recordings ==
- Chandos CHAN 8987 (1991): Sherrill Milnes (Guido), Seth McCoy (Marco), Blythe Walker (Monna Vanna), Nickolas Karousatos (Torello), Jon Thorsteinsson (Borso); Icelandic Opera Chorus; Iceland Symphony Orchestra, Igor Buketoff, conductor and arranger (sung in English)
- Ondine ODE12492: Moscow Conservatory Opera Soloists: Evgeniya Dushina, Vladimir Avtomonov, Dmitry Ivanchey, Edward Arutyunyan, Mikhail Golovushkin Moscow Conservatory Students Choir, Moscow Conservatory Students Symphony Orchestra, Vladimir Ashkenazy conductor, piano; orchestrated by Gennadi Belov. June 2014 (sung in Russian).
