= Ludmilla Buketoff Turkevich =

American academic

- Born: September 14, 1909; New Britain, Connecticut, U.S.
- Died: April 14, 1995 (age 85); Princeton, New Jersey, U.S.
- Other name: L. B. Turkevich
- Relatives: Igor Buketoff (brother); Leontius Turkevich (father-in-law); Anthony L. Turkevich (brother-in-law)

Ludmilla Buketoff Turkevich (September 14, 1909 – April 14, 1995) was an American professor of Russian language and literature. She was the first woman to teach at Princeton University, and the chair of the Russian department at Douglass College, the women's college of Rutgers University.

== Early life and education ==
Ludmilla Buketoff was born in New Britain, Connecticut, the daughter of Konstantin Buketoff and Milica Lebedeff Buketoff. Her father was a Russian Orthodox priest; her younger brother Igor Buketoff became an orchestra conductor. She graduated from New York University in 1930, and earned a master's degree in Romance language and literature at the University of Kansas in 1932, and completed doctoral studies at Columbia University in 1949, with a thesis titled "Cervantes in Russia".

== Career ==
Turkevich taught Spanish and Russian at the New Jersey College for Women in the 1940s. In 1944, she became the first woman to become a lecturer at Princeton University. In 1958, she supported the United States delegation at the Second Conference for Peaceful Uses of Atomic Energy, held in Geneva. In 1959, she was a lecturer at the American Exhibition in Moscow. In 1961 she received a distinguished service award from the United States Information Agency.

Turkevich was chair of the Russian department at Douglass College of Rutgers University for eighteen years, from 1961 to 1979. She hosted a campus reception for visiting Russian journalists in 1965. She was president of the American Association of Teachers of Slavic and Eastern European Languages.

== Publications ==
Turkevich published her work in academic journals including Modern Language Review, The Modern Language Journal, The Russian Review, Russian Language Journal, Slavic Linguistics and Language Teaching, Problems of Communism, Hispania, St. Vladimir's Theological Quarterly, and Books Abroad. She and her husband edited The Guide to Russian Scientific Literature from 1947 to 1952.

- "Russian Instruction at Princeton University" (1948)
- Cervantes in Russia (1950)
- "Soviet Propaganda and the Rebellious Artist" (1956)
- "The Second Congress of Soviet Writers" (1956)
- "The Chukchi and Soviet Literature" (1956)
- "Russian Women" (1957)
- "Soviet Literary Periodicals" (1958)
- "Status of Spanish Studies in the Soviet Union" (1958)
- "Boris Leonidovich Pasternak" (1959)
- Russian for the Scientist (1959, with John Turkevich)
- "Soviet Education" (1960)
- "Tradition and Innovation in the Occidental Lyric of the Last Decade V. Soviet Poetry" (1961)
- Masterpieces of Russian Literature (1964, editor)
- Spanish Literature in Russia and the Soviet Union, 1735-1964 (1967)
- "Russian and the Language Crisis in America" (1971)
- "Culture Under Lenin and Stalin" (1973)
- "Bilingual Students in Russian Programs" (1976)
- "Russian Literature in Modern Japan" (1977)
- "The Princeton 'Golgotha' and its Master Repin" (1983)
- "Pushkin and Orthodox spirituality" (1987)
- "Religious aspect of Dostoevsky's Idiot" (1989)

== Personal life ==
In 1934, Buketoff married chemistry professor and Greek Orthodox priest John Turkevich, whose father was Russian Orthodox metropolitan Leontius Turkevich. They had two daughters, Tamara and Marina. She died in 1995, at the age of 85, in Princeton, New Jersey.
