= Maude Miner Hadden =

American social worker and anti-prostitution activist

Maude E. Miner Hadden (1880–1967) was a pioneer in the field of social work and an activist in the anti-prostitution movement. She was the first woman probation officer of the Magistrates' court in New York City, and the co-founder of Waverly House for Girls, the Girls Service League, the Committee on Protective Work for Girls, the Institute of World Affairs, and the Palm Beach Round Table.

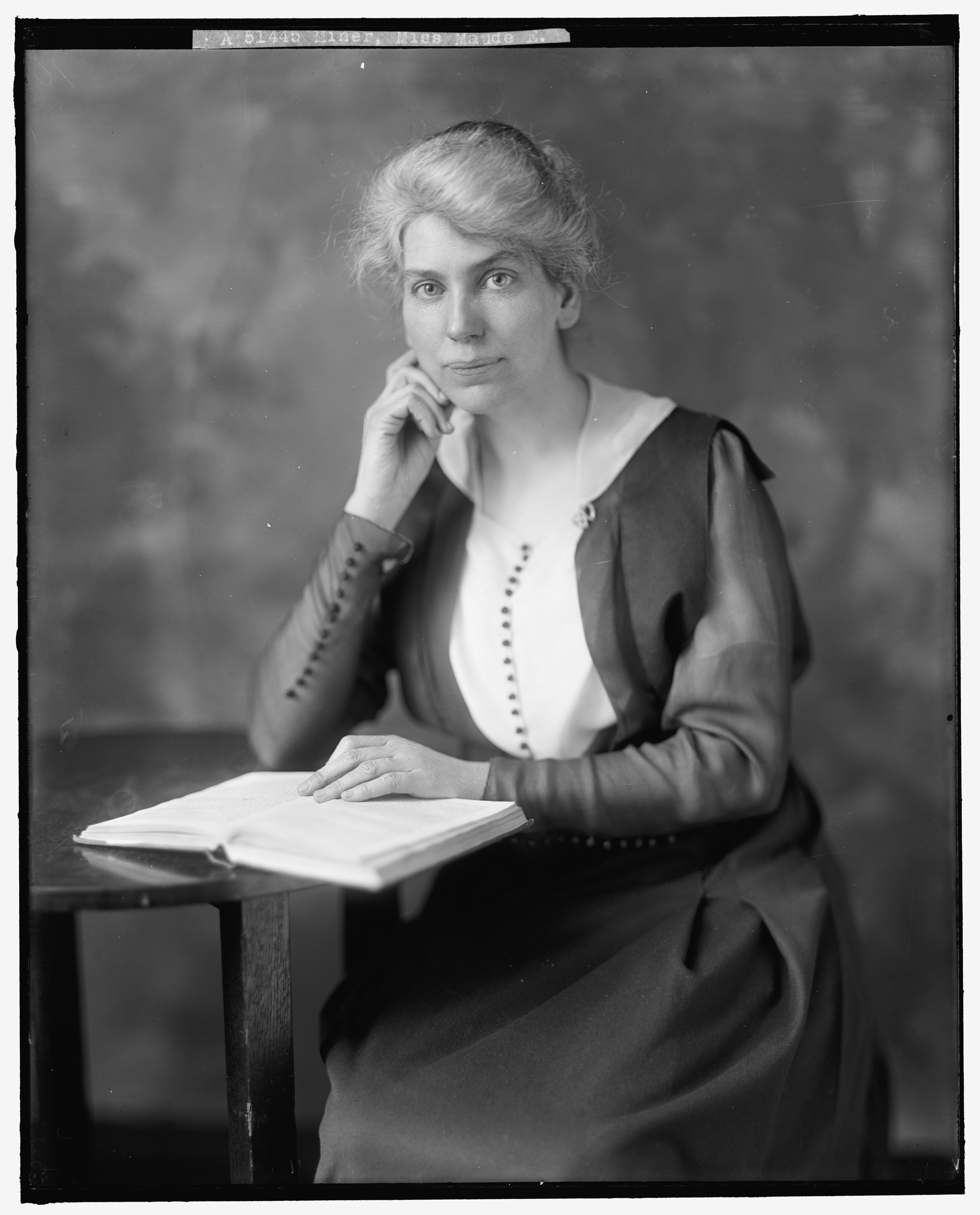
Maude Miner, 1905

== Early life ==
Maude Miner Hadden was born in Leyden, Massachusetts, in June 1880. She was the daughter of James R. and Mary E. (Newcomb) Miner. Maude graduated from Smith College in 1901, and earned an M.A. (1906) and doctorate (1917) from Columbia University. She taught history and mathematics at Hood College in Maryland, from 1901 to 1906, before moving into social work.

Hadden's Ph.D. thesis, Slavery of Prostitution: A Plea for Emancipation, was published as a book in 1916.

== Social reform ==
Hadden was a pioneer in the field of social work, the first woman probation officer of the Magistrates' court in New York City where she served in the Night Court from 1907 to 1909. She was also appointed a member of the New York State Probation Commission by the governor and served as secretary of the New York Protective and Probation Association starting in 1913. Through her work with young women in the courts, Miner came to believe in legal and education reform to end prostitution.

How can prostitution be suppressed? By enacting adequate laws against prostitution and securing honest enforcement of laws, by dealing wisely and effectively with offenders when they come into the courts, by doing preventive work to lessen both demand and supply, and by arousing and sustaining a public demand that prostitution shall be suppressed.

— Maude Miner, 1914,

=== Waverly House ===
In 1908, Hadden and her sister, Stella Miner, opened Waverly House for Girls at 165 West 10th Street in Manhattan. Waverly House was a temporary home for young women, many of whom were runaways or who were released to Miner from the courts. Upon arriving, inmates were questioned about their family and sexual histories; they were subjected to primitive IQ tests; and they were scrutinized for STIs. Of the first 151 women held in Waverley House, 50 tested positive and were held for treatment. Miner did much of the questioning herself, and then sought to confirm or disprove the women's stories. If a family seemed “immoral,” Miner worked with other reformers to keep them under surveillance. She targeted immigrant and Jewish women in particular, believing them to be inherently defective. During this time she also became an evangelist for the detention house idea, promoting it in speeches across the country, capitalizing on the rhetorical momentum around ‘white slavery,’ claiming detention houses as vital to redeeming the “moral slaves. Pamphlets at the time promoting Waverly House purportedly instructed the inmates in Victorian sexual ethics, sewing, housework and hat-making and helped the girls to return home or gain safe employment. The New York Probation Association was formed to help fund Waverly house. Donators included Andrew Carnegie and Mrs. Russell Sage.

=== Girls' Service League ===
Hadden and Stella also founded the Girls Service League in 1908. The purpose of the Girls' Service League was, in Hadden's words, "to help needy girls through intensive personal contact and by bringing them together as a group into a homelike atmosphere". The League offered housing, guidance, vocational advice, work training, and educational opportunities. The Girls' Service League opened in Manhattan, then expanded to other New York locations. Hadden served as president of the Girls' Service League for 12 years.

=== Committee on Protective Work for Girls ===
After the United States entered World War I, Miner established the Committee on Protective Work for Girls (CPWG) to address the problem of prostitution and venereal disease around military training camps. The Chamberlain–Kahn Act, passed in 1918, addressed the same problem, but with more repressive results. Under this law, women suspected to be prostitutes could be detained, inspected, and sent to a rehabilitation center if they were suspected of having a venereal disease. Eventually the interest in policing military camps increased, and the CPWG was placed under the War Department's Division of Law Enforcement. Miner resigned as director of the committee, and in a private letter she stated that the War Department was placing the well-being of soldiers over that of the women.

Miner and other former members of the CPWG also criticized the Chamberlain–Kahn Act at a national conference on venereal disease in 1920, stating that it deprived women of their personal liberties, discriminated against women, and was ineffective in protecting society from venereal disease.

== Marriage and international peace initiatives ==
In 1924, Miner married Alexander Mactier Hadden, grandson of silk importer David Hadden. Together they founded and ran the Institute of World Affairs. After Alexander died in 1942, Maude continued this work.

=== Institute of World Affairs ===
The idea for an international students' union "dedicated to the promotion of international understanding and goodwill" came to the Haddens during a honeymoon layover in Geneva, the headquarters of the League of Nations. The Students International Union was founded in 1924 with 18 students from six countries. It quickly increased to more than 200 students, and the group moved to new quarters overlooking University Park, Geneva.

In 1941, the Students International Union moved to Salisbury, Connecticut, because of the dangers of World War II, and changed its name to the Institute of World Affairs. It was located on 300 acres of farmland in northwestern Connecticut, near Twin Lakes. The Institute ran summer seminars in Connecticut every year from 1940 to 1993. As of 1967 (the year of Hadden's death), nearly 2,000 students from 87 countries had graduated from the program.

In 1957, Hadden and the Institute were nominated for the Nobel Peace Prize.

=== Palm Beach Round Table ===
The Haddens founded the Palm Beach Round Table in Palm Beach, Florida, in 1932. The Round Table began as casual meetings in private homes, and eventually moved to the Everglades Club. The Round Table sponsors an annual series of lectures on current affairs. Speakers at the Round Table have included Jonathan Wainwright, John Mason Brown, H. R. Knickerbocker, Barbara Cartland, Omar Bradley, James W. Fulbright, Maria von Trapp, Douglas MacArthur, Richard Nixon, Ralph Nader, Benjamin Netanyahu, and Bob Dole. Hadden served as president from its founding to 1962. In 2021, the Round Table celebrated its 90th anniversary.

== Later years and legacy ==
In addition to her publications on prostitution and world peace, Hadden was the author of two volumes of poetry, Garnet Rock and High Horizons, and an autobiography, Quest for peace : personal and political.

Hadden died April 14, 1967, in Palm Beach, Florida, and was buried in St. Thomas Cemetery, Manhattan, New York City.

=== Works ===
- Slavery of prostitution, a plea for emancipation, New York: The Macmillan Company, 1916
- Quest for peace: personal and political, Washington, D.C.: Farrar, 1968
- Garnet rock, New York: Comet Press, 1944
- High horizons, New York: Whittier Books, 1957
- "Probation work in the Magistrates' Courts of New York City", New York: New York Probation Association, 1909.
