= Deborah Drattell =

American composer (born 1956)

deborah drattell
- Born: 1956 (age 69–70); Brooklyn, NY, United States
- Occupation: Composer
- Website: https://deborahdrattell.com/

deborah drattell (born 1956) is an American composer and belt designer known for bringing an "elegance, drama, and boldness of design" to both fields. She was born in Brooklyn, New York and started her career in music as a violinist. She has been lauded as "a remarkably original voice" by Opera News for her contributions to contemporary classical music. Her compositions are often described as lyrical, dramatic, and emotionally evocative. Critics have noted her ability to fuse traditional operatic elements with modernist sensibilities. drattell has served as composer-in-residence with the New York City Opera, the Glimmerglass Opera Company, the Denver Symphony Orchestra, and the New Orleans Symphony Orchestra, and her works have ben performed by numerous ensembles including the New York Philharmonic, Orchestra of St. Luke's, at the Tanglewood and Caramoor Music Festivals. In July of 2026, drattell returned to composition after an approximately twenty-year hiatus with her new work Fanfare 2026, which celebrates the United States Semiquincentennial.

== Biography ==
Early Life and Education

drattell was born in Brooklyn, New York. She developed her musical foundation as a violinist before shifting her focus to composition. She earned a Ph.D. in composition from the University of Chicago, where she studied under Ralph Shapey.

Personal Life

Drattell lives in Brooklyn, New York, with her husband, a physician, and their four children.

== Career ==
Opera

Her operas include:

“Festival of Regrets" (1999): A one-act opera with a libretto by Wendy Wasserstein, premiered at the Glimmerglass Opera and later performed as part of the Central Park trilogy at the New York City Opera.

"Lilith" (2001): A full-length opera exploring the biblical figure of Adam's first wife, premiered at the New York City Opera.

"Nicholas and Alexandra" (2003): Commissioned by the Los Angeles Opera, this opera featured Plácido Domingo as Rasputin and explored the final days of Russia's Romanov dynasty. She rewrote the role of the villain in Nicholas and Alexandra, Rasputin, from baritone to tenor when Plácido Domingo expressed interest in singing the role. Nicholas and Alexandra (2003, Los Angeles Opera), with Plácido Domingo as Rasputin, Nancy Gustafson as Alexandra, and Rod Gilfry as Nicholas.

"Marina" (2003): A one-act chamber opera based on the life of Russian poet Marina Tsvetaeva, premiered at the D.R.2 Theater in New York City.

Best Friends (2005) libretto by Wendy Wasserstein and Christopher Durang

Orchestral and Chamber Music

During her tenure as Composer-in-Residence at the Denver Symphony and the New York City Opera, drattell composed several notable works, including:

"Sorrow is Not Melancholy" (1993): Recorded by the Seattle Symphony, Gerard Schwarz, conductor. Her works have been performed by prestigious ensembles, including the Chamber Music Society of Lincoln Center, the New Orleans Symphony, and the New York Philharmonic.

Additional Roles and Initiatives

As Composer-in-Residence at the New York City Opera (1998–2001), drattell launched the annual "Showcasing American Composers" series to highlight emerging talent.

Honors and Awards

drattell's accolades include:

The Leonard Bernstein Fellowship in Composition at Tanglewood

Commissions from the Fromm Foundation and Meet the Composer

An NEA Grant and ASCAP awards

== Selected Works ==
Operas

- Festival of Regrets (1999)
- Lilith (2001)
- Marina Tsvetaeva (2002)
- Nicholas and Alexandra (2003)
- Best Friends (2005)

Orchestral

- Clarinet Concerto: Fire Dances (1986)
- Syzygy (1987)
- Spanish Fly (1988)
- Lilith: Orchestral Suite (1988)
- Flute Concerto: The Fire Within (1989)
- Jephthah (1990) with chorus
- Sorrow is not Melancholy (1993)
- Saxophone Concerto: Be Still My Spirit (1994)
- The Lost Lover (1998)
- Fanfare 2026 (2026)
- Festival of Lights (anticipated December 2026) with chorus

Chamber

- Sorrow Is Not Melancholy (1992) string quartet
  - arr. cello quartet (1994)
  - arr. clarinet quintet (anticipated 2026)
- Appassionata (1992) string quartet
- Psalm and Lament (1993)
- Alone (1994) soprano, string quartet
- Evening Star (1994) soprano, violin, cello, piano
- In Loneliness Lamented (1994) string quartet, piano
- Streams of Tender Ribboning Time (1995) alto flute
- Eishes Chayil (1996) soprano solo
- Love Gave It To Me (1996) soprano, mezzo, tenor, piano
- Ruminating Sadness (1998) cello, piano
