= Marvin David Levy =

American composer

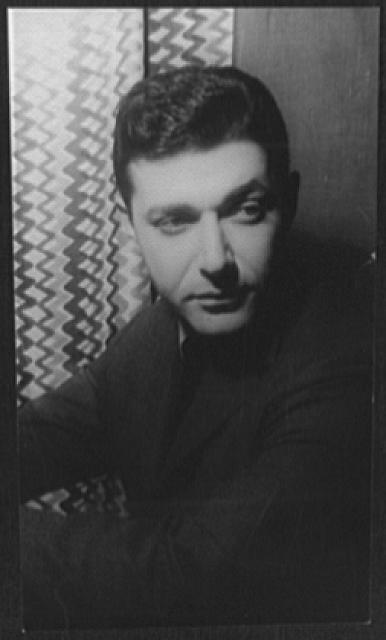
Marvin David Levy (1959) Photo by Carl Van Vechten

Marvin David Levy (August 2, 1932 – February 9, 2015) was an American composer, best known for his opera Mourning Becomes Electra.

Mourning Becomes Electra was given its world premiere at the Metropolitan Opera in 1967. Although deemed a failure at the time, the work was revived in 1998 in a revised version by the composer to a triumphant success at the Lyric Opera of Chicago. The New York City Opera and the Seattle Opera staged the work in 2003, and the Florida Grand Opera staged the opera in 2013.

A disc featuring Canto de los Marranos (Song of the Marranos) and excerpts from Shir Shel Moshe (Song of Moses) was issued as part of the Milken Archive of American Jewish Music by Naxos in 2004.

The Passaic, New Jersey-born Levy died in Fort Lauderdale, Florida on February 9, 2015, aged 82.
