= Conrad (name) =

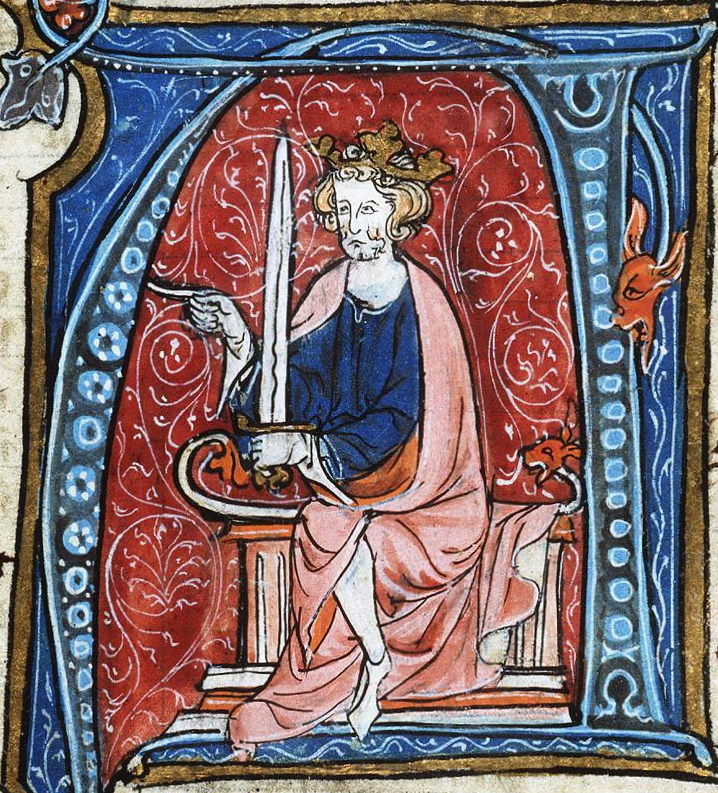
- Conrad I of Germany
- Pronunciation: English: /ˈkɒnræd/ KON-rad; German: [ˈkɔnʁaːt]
- Gender: Male

Origin
- Meaning: "bold counsel"

Other names
- Related names: Konrad, Corrado (Italian)

Conrad is a German masculine given name and a surname.

== Origin and meaning ==
It is derived from the Proto-Germanic name Konrad, from conja (meaning 'bold') and rad ('counsel'). It was the name of a 10th-century bishop of Constance, and became popular in post-medieval English, and post-medieval French. It regained popularity in the English-speaking world in the 19th century. It is recorded as a surname as early as 1297. Old English equivalent is Cenred.

There are over one hundred forms and spelling variants of the surname. In English, Coonrod is a variant spelling and a variant pronunciation of Conrad. (Note: This confusion in spelling and pronunciation was the crux of a legal dissent in the case of Carpenter v. the State before the Missouri Supreme Court in 1843.) Variants in other languages include:

- German: Konrad, Kohrt, Kordt, Kunrad, Kuno, Kuhndert, Kuhnt, Kurt and Kurth
- Dutch: Coen, Coenraad, Koen(raad), Koendert, Koene
- Afrikaans: Conradie
- Icelandic: Konráður, Konráð
- Irish: Ó Conradh (In Irish, the word conradh also means 'league' or 'alliance')
- Latvian: Konrāds
- Polish: Konrad
- Czech, Slovak and Hungarian: Konrád
- Italian: Corrado
- Spanish and Portuguese: Conrado
- Diminutives: Kienzle, Kondzio Kuhn, Kunc, Kunz, Kuntz, Kunzel, Zunzelman,
- Patronymics: Kurten, Coners, Conerding, Conradsen, Coenraets, Kondratowicz, Konradowicz, Kondratowitz, kondrachuk

== People ==
=== First name ===
- Conrad (prior), prior of Christ Church at Canterbury from 1108 to 1126
- Conrad Aiken (1889–1973), American writer
- Conrad Anker (born 1962), American mountaineer
- Conrad Bain (1923–2013), Canadian-American actor
- Conrad Bassett-Bouchard (born 1989), American Scrabble player
- Conrad Black (born 1944), British newspaper publisher and writer
- Conrad Buff (born 1948), American film editor
- Conrad Burns (1935–2016), American politician
- Conrad Coleby (born 1979), Australian actor
- Conrad K. Cyr (1931–2016), American judge
- Conrad Dobler (1950–2023), American football player
- Conrad Felixmüller (1897–1977), German painter and printmaker
- Conrad of Gelnhausen (1320–1390), German theologian
- Conrad Gessner (1516–1565), Swiss naturalist and bibliographer
- Conrad Hall (1926–2003), American cinematographer
- Conrad Harder (born 2005), Danish footballer
- Conrad Hilton (1887–1979), American hotelier
- Conrad Hilton Jr. (1926–1969), American socialite
- Conrad Hollenbeck (1847–1915), American politician and judge
- Conrad Hubbard, American game designer and writer
- Conrad Janis (1928–2022), American jazz musician and actor
- Conrad N. Jordan (1830–1903), American banker
- Conrad Keely (born 1972), American singer
- Conrad Knowles (1810–1844), Australian actor
- Conrad Lant (1963–2026), English musician
- Conrad Leinemann (born 1971), Canadian beach volleyball player
- Conrad Leonard (1898–2003), British composer and pianist
- Conrad of Lichtenberg (1240–1299), German bishop
- Conrad Longmire (1921–2010), American theoretical physicist
- Conrad Malte-Brun (1755–1826), Danish-born French geographer
- Conrad Marais (born 1989), Namibian rugby union player
- Conrad Murray (born 1953), Grenadian physician, convicted of the manslaughter of Michael Jackson
- Conrad Nagel (1897–1970), American actor
- Conrad Nightingale (born 1945), American steeplechase runner
- Conrad Phillips (1925–2016), British actor
- Conrad Ricamora, American actor and singer
- Conrad Richter (1890–1968), American novelist
- Conrad Ross, Uruguayan footballer and manager
- Conrad Roy (1995–2014), American marine salvage captain whose suicide resulted in a manslaughter conviction of his girlfriend
- Conrad Sewell (born 1988), Australian singer
- Conrad Smith (born 1981), New Zealand rugby player
- Conrad Stoltz (born 1973), South African triathlete
- Conrad Tillard (born 1964), American politician, Baptist minister, radio host, author, and activist
- Conrad Veidt (1893–1943), German actor

=== Surname ===
Conrad
Origin
- Meaning: "bold counsel"
- Region of origin: Germany

- Alfred H. Conrad (1924–1970), professor of economics
- Agnes C. Conrad (1918–2011), American archivist and historian
- Barnaby Conrad (1922–2013), American artist and writer
- Barnaby Conrad III (born 1952), American artist and writer
- Breanna Conrad (born 1989), American television personality
- Brian Conrad (born 1970), American mathematician
- Charles Magill Conrad (1804–1878), American politician
- Chris Conrad (disambiguation), multiple people
- Clyde Lee Conrad (1948–1998), American spy
- Con Conrad (1891–1938), American songwriter
- David Conrad (born 1967), American actor
- Demian Conrad (born 1974), Swiss designer
- Ethan Conrad (born 2004), American baseball player
- Frank Conrad (1874–1941), American radio broadcaster
- Franz Josef Conrad (1944–1985), German politician
- Franz Conrad von Hötzendorf (1852–1925), Chief of the General Staff of the Austro-Hungarian Army at the outbreak of World War I
- Glen E. Conrad (1949–2021), American judge
- Holmes Conrad (1840–1915), American lawyer
- J. R. Conrad (born 1974), American football player
- Jeff Conrad (born 1978), American drummer
- Jess Conrad (born 1936), British singer and actor
- Jimmy Conrad (born 1977), American soccer player
- Joe Conrad (1930–2018), American golfer
- Joseph Conrad (1857–1924), Polish-British novelist
- Joseph Conrad (French colonel) (1788–1837), killed at the Battle of Barbastro
- Joseph Conrad (general) (1830–1897), American Civil War general
- Kent Conrad (born 1948), American politician
- Kevin Conrad (born 1968), Papua New Guinean environmentalist
- Kimberley Conrad (born 1962), American model
- Kurt Conrad (1911–1982), German politician
- Lars Conrad (born 1976), German freestyle swimmer
- Lauren Conrad (born 1986), American television personality
- Lawrence Conrad (born 1949), British historian
- Leon Conrad, British embroidery designer
- Max Conrad (1903–1979), American aviator
- Michael Conrad (1925–1983), American actor
- Michael Conrad (biologist) (1941–2000), American biologist
- Norman Conrad (born 1947), Canadian politician
- Paul Conrad (1924–2010), American political cartoonist
- Pete Conrad (1930–1999), American astronaut
- Peter Conrad (disambiguation), multiple people
- Reinaldo Conrad (born 1942), Brazilian sailor
- Richard Conrad (1935–2019), American opera singer
- Robert Conrad, several people
- Roy Conrad (1940–2002), American actor
- Shukri Conrad (born 1967), South African cricketer and cricket coach
- Steven Conrad (born 1968), American screenwriter
- Timothy Abbott Conrad (1803–1877), American zoologist and geologist
- Tony Conrad (1940–2016), American artist and film-maker
- Victor Conrad (1876–1962), Austrian scientist
- William Conrad (1920–1994), American actor
- William N. Conrad (1889–1968), New York politician
- William Conrad III (Born 1977), New York Assembly 140th District

=== Royalty ===
- Conrad I of Germany (890–918)
- Conrad the Red (922–955)
- Conrad II, Holy Roman Emperor (990–1039)
- Conrad III of Germany (1093–1152)
- Conrad IV of Germany (1228–1254)
- Conrad V of Germany (1252–1268)
- Konrad I of Masovia (c. 1187 – 31 August 1247)
- Conrad I, Duke of Bavaria (1020–1055)
- Conrad II, Duke of Bavaria (1052–1055)
- Conrad of Burgundy (925–993)
- Conrad I, Duke of Carinthia (975–1011)
- Conrad II, Duke of Carinthia (1003–1039)
- Conrad I, Count of Luxembourg (1040–1086)
- Conrad II, Count of Luxembourg (died 1136)
- Conrad II of Italy (1074–1101)
- Conrad of Montferrat (1140s–1192)
- Conrad I, Burgrave of Nuremberg (1186–1261)
- Conrad I, Duke of Swabia (died 997)
- Conrad II, Duke of Swabia (1173–1196)

=== Saints ===
- Saint Conrad of Constance (900–975)
- Saint Conrad of Parzham (1818–1894)
- Saint Conrad of Piacenza (1290–1351)
- Blessed Conrad of Offida (1241–1306)
- Blessed Conrad of Mondsee (died 1145)
- Blessed Conrad of Ottobeuren (died 1227)

== Fictional characters ==
- Conrad the Cat, Warner Bros. cartoon character
- Adrian Conrad, character in the television series Stargate SG-1
- Hermes Conrad, character of the television series Futurama
- Conrad Ecklie, character in the television series CSI: Crime Scene Investigation
- Conrad Grayson, character in the television series Revenge
- Conrad S. "Duke" Hauser, First Sergeant of G.I. Joe, elite anti-terrorism task force
- Conrad McMasters, character on the television series Matlock
- Conrad Shepard, character in the Seasons 1–3 of television series Weeds
- Corrado John "Junior" Soprano Jr., fictional character on the television series The Sopranos
- Conrad Stargard, character in a series of novels by Leo Frankowski
- Conrad Weller, character in the Kyo Kara Maoh! series of novels by Tomo Takabayashi

== See also ==
- Conrad (disambiguation)
- Conradus (disambiguation)
- Saint Conrad (disambiguation)
- Konrad, surname
- Konrad (given name)
- Coenraad
- Cuno and Kuno, medieval diminutive forms of Conrad
