= Conradus =

Conradus is a masculine given name. It is often a latinisation of the name Conrad or Konrad, but is also a Dutch given name. People called Conradus include:

- Conradus Celtis (AKA Conrad Celtes, 1459–1508), German humanist and poet
- Conradus Dasypodius (AKA Cunradus, Konrad and Conrad Dasypodius, 1532–1600), Swiss mathematician
- Conradus de Pistoria (fl. early 15th century), Italian composer
- Conradus Eubel (AKA Konrad Eubel, 1842–1923), German Franciscan historian
- Conradus Gesnerus (AKA Conrad Gessner, 1516–65), Swiss naturalist and bibliographer
- Conradus Hirsaugiensis (AKA Conrad of Hirsau, c. 1070 – c. 1150), German Benedictine monk and writer
- Conradus Leemans (1809–93), Dutch Egyptologist
- Conradus Megenbergensis (AKA Conrad of Megenberg, 1309–74), German Catholic writer and scholar
- Conradus Mutianus (AKA Konrad Mutian, 1470–1526), German humanist
- Conradus Sapientis (AKA Konrad Witz, 1400/1410 – 1445/1446), German painter
- Conradus Saxo (AKA Conrad of Saxony and Conradus Holyinger, before 1245 – 1279), German Franciscan friar and writer
- Conradus Viëtor (1588–1657), Dutch Lutheran minister whose portrait was painted by Frans Hals
- Conradus Vorstius (AKA Conrad Vorstius and Conrad or Konrad Vorst, 1569–1622), German-Dutch Protestant theologian

== See also ==
- Conrad (disambiguation)
- Konrad (disambiguation)
