= Conrad =

Conrad may refer to:

== People ==
- Conrad (name)
- Saint Conrad (disambiguation)

== Places ==
=== United States ===
- Conrad, Iowa, a city
- Conrad, Montana, a city
- Conrad Glacier, Washington

=== Elsewhere ===
- Conrad, Alberta, Canada, a former unincorporated community
- Conrad Mountains, Queen Maud Land, Antarctica
- Mount Conrad, Oates Land, Antarctica
- Mount Conrad (Canada), Purcell Mountains, British Columbia

== Businesses ==
- Conrad Editora, a Brazilian publisher
- Conrad Electronic, a German retailer
- Conrad Hotels, the global luxury brand of Hilton Hotels
- Conrad Models, a German manufacturer of diecast toys and promotional models

== Other uses ==
- Conrad (comic strip)
- CONRAD (organization), an American organization that promotes reproductive health in the developing world
- Conrad (raccoon), a Canadian raccoon
- ORP Conrad, name of the cruiser HMS Danae (D44) while loaned to the Polish Navy (1944-1946)

== See also ==
- Conradi
- Conradin
- Conradines
- Conrads (disambiguation)
- Corrado (disambiguation)
- Conradt (disambiguation)
- Konrad (disambiguation)
