= Konrad =

Konrad may refer to:

== People ==
- Konrad (given name), a German given name
- Konrad (surname)
- Konrád, a Hungarian, Czech and Slovak given name and surname

=== Royalty ===
- Konrad I of Germany (890–918)
- Konrad II, Holy Roman Emperor of the German People (990–1039)
- Konrad III of Germany (1093–1152)
- Konrad IV of Germany (1228–1254)
- Konrad II of Germany and Italy (1074–1101)
- Konrad I of Masovia (1187–1247)
- Konrad I, Count of Württemberg (died 1110)
- Konrad II, Count of Württemberg (died 1143)

== Fiction ==
- Konrad (assassin), a character in the 1999 novel All Tomorrow's Parties by William Gibson
- Konrad Curze, a Space Marine (Warhammer 40,000)
- Konrad, first novel of David Ferring's The Konrad Saga, a series of Warhammer Fantasy novels
- John Konrad, American lieutenant colonel in the video game Spec Ops: The Line
- Konrad, the protagonist of the poem "Die Geschichte vom Daumenlutscher" from Struwwelpeter
- Konrad, a video game character from The Battle for Wesnoth

== Other uses ==
- Konrad KM-011, a sportscar
- Operation Konrad, during the Battle of Budapest in January 1945
- Storm Konrad in Europe, March 2025; see 2024–25 European windstorm season § Storm Konrad

== See also ==
- Conrad (disambiguation)
  - Conrad (name)
- Coonrod (disambiguation)
- Konrads (disambiguation)
