= Vietor =

Vietor may refer to:

== People ==
- Conradus Viëtor, 17th-century Dutch Lutheran minister
- Deborah Vietor-Engländer, British author
- Else Wenz-Viëtor (1882–1973), German children's book illustrator and artist
- Harold Duane Vietor (1931–2016), American judge
- Hieronymus Vietor (ca. 1480 – late 1546 or early 1547), printer active in Kraków and Vienna
- Tommy Vietor (born 1980), American public official and podcaster
- Wilhelm Viëtor (1850–1918), German phonetician

== Other uses ==
- Vietor Rock, rock formation in Antarctica
