= Konrad (surname) =

Konrad is the surname of:

- Alexander Konrad (1890–1940), Russian explorer
- Antoine Konrad (born 1975), birth name of DJ Antoine, Swiss DJ
- Arthur Konrad (1934–2025), Mayor of Vaduz
- Carina Konrad (born 1982), German politician
- Christoph Werner Konrad (born 1957), German politician
- Edmond Konrad (1909–1997), Rear Admiral, United States Navy
- Frank Konrad (born 1967), Liechtenstein politician
- Franz Konrad (racing driver) (born 1951), Austrian racing driver
- Franz Konrad (SS officer) (1906–1952), German SS officer executed for war crimes
- Franz Konrad von Rodt (1706–1775), Bishop of Constance
- Helmut Konrad (born 1954), Liechtenstein politician
- Martin Konrad (born 1978), Austrian racing driver
- Michaela Konrad (born 1972), Austrian artist
- Rudolf Konrad (1891–1964), German general during World War II
- Otto Konrad (born 1964), Austrian football player
- Paul Konrad (1877–1948), Swiss geometrician and mycologist
- Rob Konrad (born 1976), American football player
- Ulrich Konrad (born 1957), German musicologist

== See also ==
- Conrad (name)
