= Conradi =

Conradi is a surname. It comes from the Germanic Konrad: kuoni and rad meaning happy or laughing or rat meaning daring/experienced counsel.

- August Conradi (1821–1873), German composer
- Edward Conradi (1869–1944), American educator and administrator
- Erwin Conradi (born 1935), German manager
- Demoiselle Conradi (died 1720), German opera singer
- Johann Georg Conradi (1645–1699), German composer
- Ludwig R. Conradi (1856–1939), Seventh-day Adventist missionary
- Maurice Conradi (1896–1947), White Russian officer
- Peter Conradi, British author and journalist
- Peter J. Conradi (born 1945), British author and academic

== See also ==
- Conradi–Hünermann syndrome
- Conrad (disambiguation)
