= NGC 3074 =

Galaxy in the constellation Leo Minor

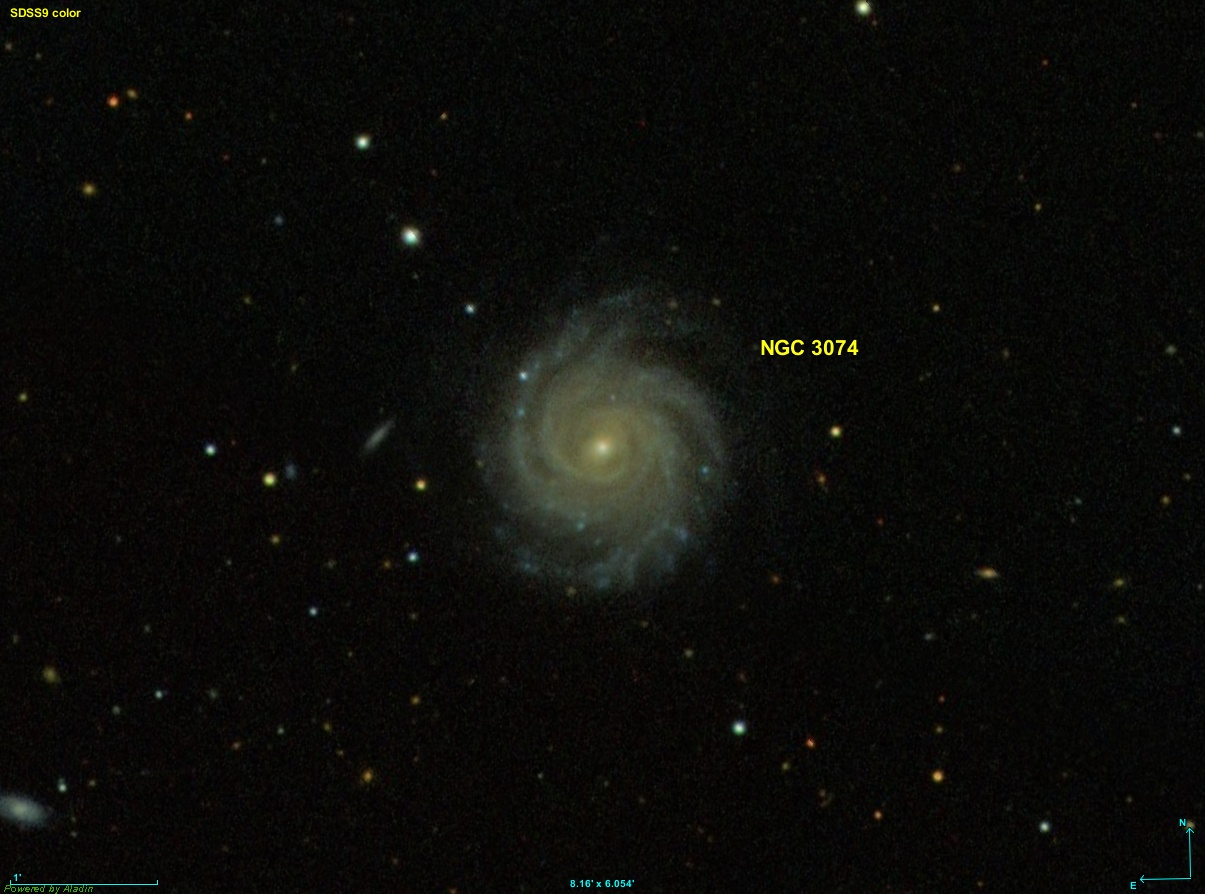
- NGC 3074 imaged by SDSS

Observation data (J2000 epoch)
- Constellation: Leo Minor
- Right ascension: 09^{h} 59^{m} 41.2437^{s}
- Declination: +35° 23′ 34.050″
- Redshift: 0.017130±0.0000117
- Heliocentric radial velocity: 5,135±4 km/s
- Distance: 259.5 ± 18.2 Mly (79.57 ± 5.58 Mpc)
- Apparent magnitude (V): 14.2g

Characteristics
- Type: SAB(rs)c
- Size: ~38,700 ly (11.87 kpc) (estimated)
- Apparent size (V): 2.3′ × 2.1′

Other designations
- IRAS 09567+3537, UGC 5366, MCG +06-22-047, PGC 28888, CGCG 182-054

NGC 3074 is a barred spiral galaxy in the constellation of Leo Minor. Its velocity with respect to the cosmic microwave background is 5,395±18 km/s, which corresponds to a Hubble distance of 259.5 ± 18.2 Mly (79.57 ± 5.58 Mpc). It was discovered by German-British astronomer William Herschel on 28 March 1786.

NGC 3074 is an active galaxy nucleus candidate, i.e. it has a compact region at the center of a galaxy that emits a significant amount of energy across the electromagnetic spectrum, with characteristics indicating that this luminosity is not produced by the stars.

== Supernovae ==
Three supernovae have been observed in NGC 3074:

- SN 1965N (Type II, mag. 15.8) was discovered by Polish astronomer Konrad Rudnicki on 21 December 1965.
- SN 2002cp (Type Ib/c, mag. 17.9) was discovered by LOTOSS (Lick Observatory and Tenagra Observatory Supernova Searches) on 28 April 2002.
- SN 2019bqe (Type Ia, mag. 18.2) was discovered by Xingming Observatory Sky Survey (XOSS) on 7 March 2019.

== See also ==
- List of NGC objects (3001–4000)
