= NGC 4453 =

Galaxy in the constellation Virgo

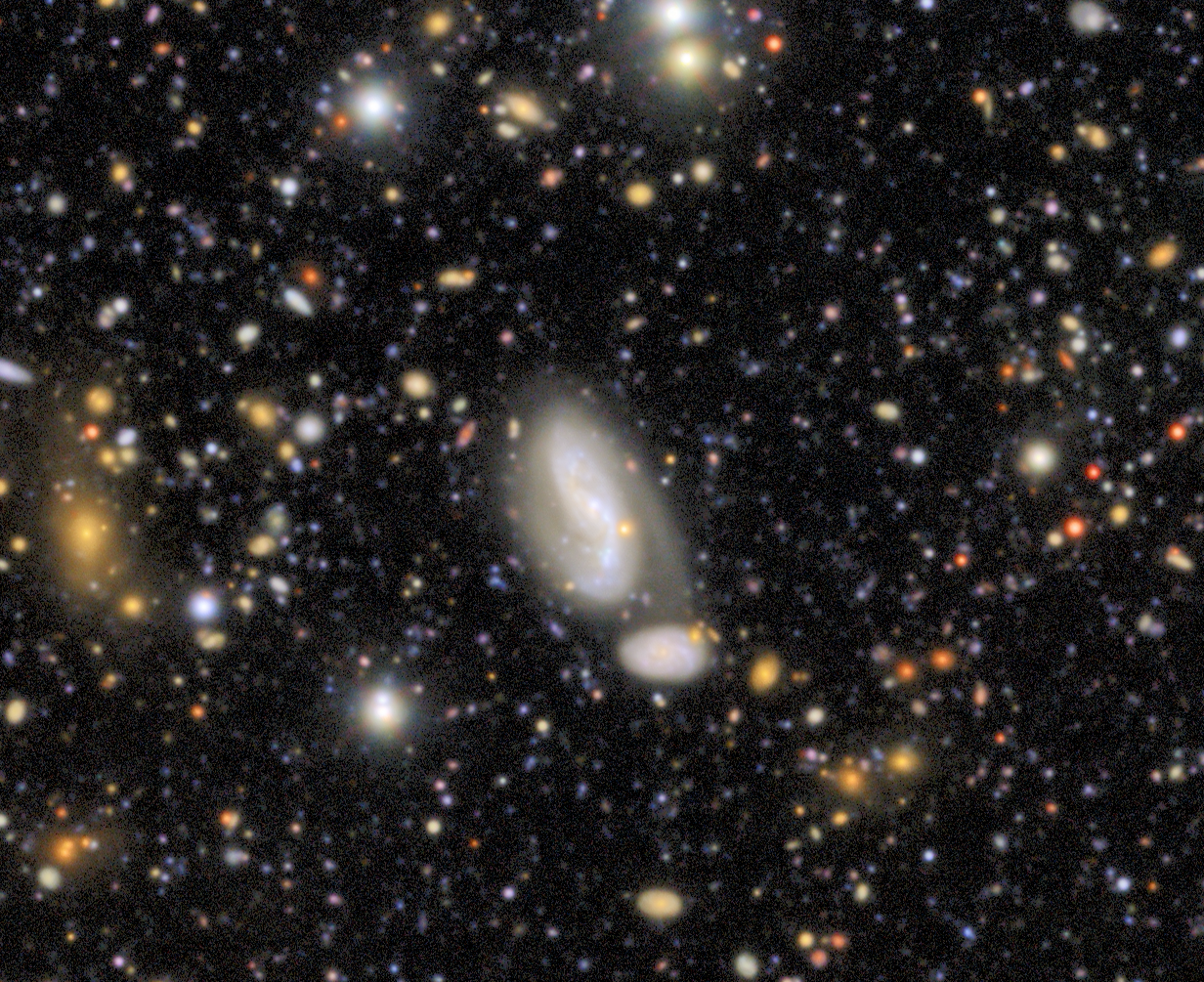
- NGC 4453 imaged by the Vera C. Rubin Observatory

Observation data (J2000 epoch)
- Constellation: Virgo
- Right ascension: 12^{h} 28^{m} 46.8456^{s}
- Declination: +06° 30′ 43.138″
- Redshift: 0.039061±0.00000579
- Heliocentric radial velocity: 11,710±2 km/s
- Distance: 579.7 ± 40.6 Mly (177.74 ± 12.45 Mpc)
- Apparent magnitude (V): 15.68

Characteristics
- Type: Sc pec
- Size: ~150,900 ly (46.26 kpc) (estimated)
- Apparent size (V): 0.63′ × 0.23′

Other designations
- VCC 1130, 2MASX J12284685+0630429, MCG +01-32-073, PGC 41072, CGCG 042-121 NED01

NGC 4453 is a peculiar spiral galaxy in the constellation of Virgo. Its velocity with respect to the cosmic microwave background is 12,051±24 km/s, which corresponds to a Hubble distance of 579.7 ± 40.6 Mly (177.74 ± 12.45 Mpc). It was discovered by German-British astronomer William Herschel on 28 January 1784.

NGC 4453 is listed as VCC 1130 which would make it part of the Virgo cluster. However, its distance (~178 Mpc) is about 10 times farther than the distance to the cluster (~16.5 Mpc), making the galaxy too far away to be a part of it.

== Supernova ==
One supernova has been observed in NGC 4453:

- SN 1966F (type unknown, mag. 17.5) was discovered by Polish astronomer Konrad Rudnicki on 18 July 1966.

== See also ==
- List of NGC objects (4001–5000)
