= St. Konrad =

St. Konrad may refer to:

- Saint Konrad, alternative spelling of Saint Conrad
- Sankt Konrad, town in Austria
