= Cuno =

Cuno is both a given name and a surname derived from medieval diminutive forms of the German male name Conrad. Notable people with the name include:

Given name:

- Cuno Amiet (1868–1961), Swiss artist
- Cuno Hoffmeister (1892–1968), German astronomer
- Cuno of Öhningen (d. 997), duke of Swabia
- Cuno of Praeneste (died 1122), German cardinal
- Cuno Pümpin (born 1939), Swiss economist
- Cuno Tarfusser (born 1954), Italian judge
- Cuno von Uechtritz-Steinkirch (1856–1908), German sculptor
- Cuno (Disco Elysium), a video-game character

Surname:

- James Cuno (born 1951), American art historian and curator
- Kurt Cuno (1896–1961), German Wehrmacht general
- Wilhelm Cuno (1876–1933), German businessman, politician and chancellor of Germany (1922–1923)

== See also ==
- 4183 Cuno, an asteroid
- Kuno (given name), often an alternative spelling of Cuno
