= Künneke =

Künneke is a German language surname. It stems from a reduced form of the male given name Konrad – and may refer to:

- Eduard Künneke (1885–1953), German composer
- Evelyn Künneke (1921–2001), German singer
