= 21 cm Mörser M1880 =

21 cm Festungs und Belagerungs Mörser M1880
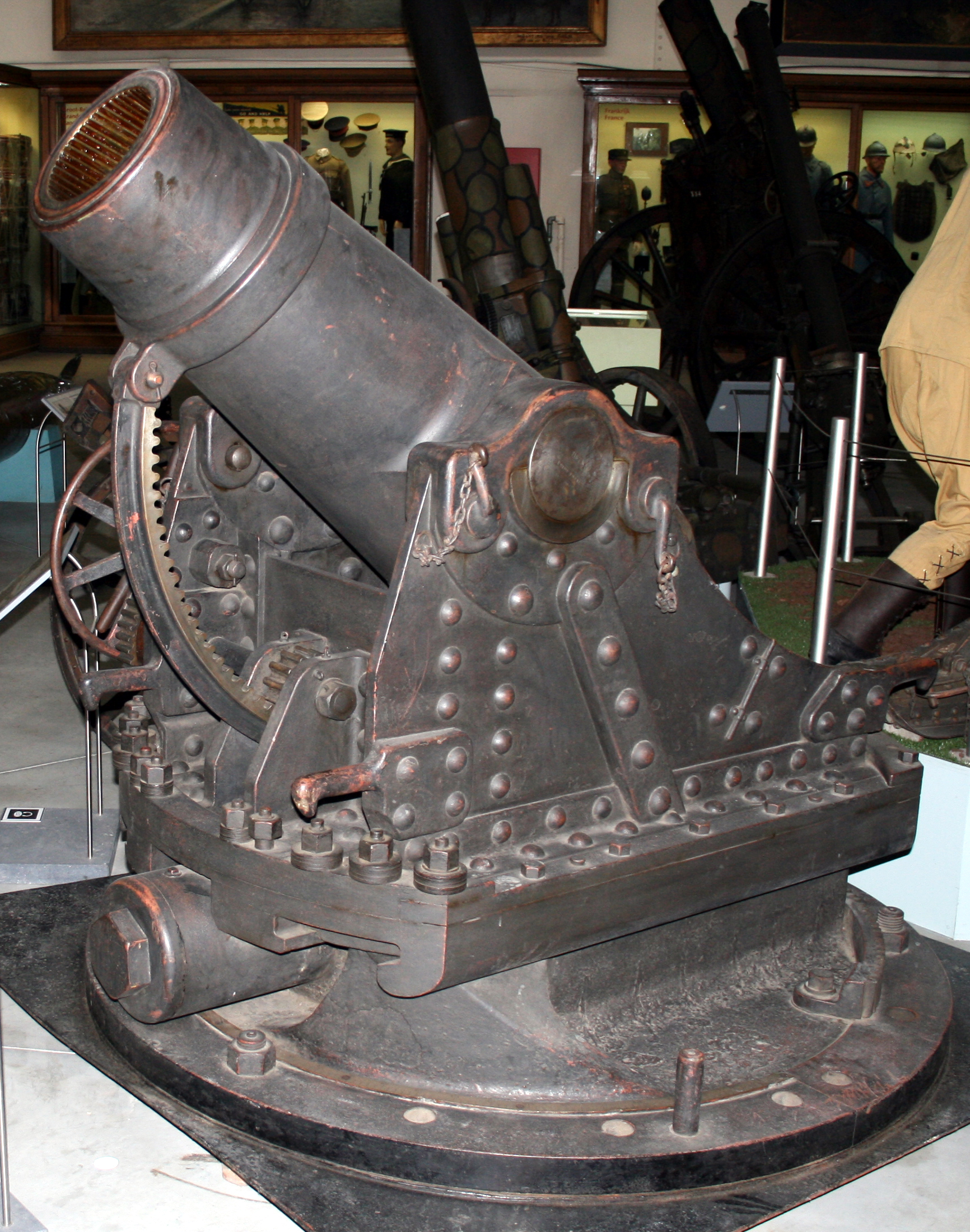
- A 21 cm mortar at the Royal Military Museum, Brussels.
- Type: Heavy mortar
- Place of origin: German Empire

Service history
- In service: 1880-?
- Used by: Belgium; Ottoman Empire; Kingdom of Romania
- Wars: Italo-Turkish War; Balkan Wars; World War I

Production history
- Designer: Krupp
- Designed: 1880
- Manufacturer: Krupp
- Produced: 1880-1900
- Variants: 7.5 cm, 8.7 cm, 10.6 cm, 12 cm, 15 cm, 24 cm

Specifications
- Mass: Barrel: 1,000 kg (2,200 lb); Carriage: 950 kg (2,090 lb)
- Barrel length: 1.3 m (4 ft 3 in) L/6.4
- Shell: Separate loading charges and 91 kg (201 lb) projectile
- Caliber: 209.3 mm (8.24 in)
- Breech: Horizontal sliding block
- Recoil: None
- Elevation: +15° to +60°
- Traverse: 120°
- Muzzle velocity: 200 m/s (660 ft/s)
- Effective firing range: 6.2 km (3.9 mi)

The 21 cm Festungs und Belagerungs Mörser M1880 or (21 cm Fortress and Siege Mortar M1880) in English was a heavy mortar designed by Krupp that armed several European countries before and during World War I.

== Background ==
During the second half of the 1800s, several military conflicts changed the balance of power in Europe and set off an arms race leading up to World War I. A company that profited from this arms race was the Friedrich Krupp Company of Essen Germany and several European countries were armed with Krupp artillery. Some customers like Belgium, Italy, Romania, and Russia imported and built Krupp designs under license while others like the Ottoman Empire and Bulgaria lacking industrial capacity imported Krupp weapons.

== Design ==
The 21 cm M1880 was a heavy mortar that was designed to provide high-angle indirect fire for siege operations. It could be used to either attack or defend fortified areas. In defense, the mortar was used to provide high-angle fire to destroy enemy communications, supply, and attack trenches dug by an attacker during siege operations or it could be used by an attacker to destroy gun turrets, casemates, pillboxes, supply dumps, and command posts.

The 21 cm M1880 was part of a family of mortars from Krupp that included 7.5 cm, 8.7 cm, 10.6 cm, 12 cm, 15 cm, and 24 cm mortars. The 21 cm M1880 was a breech-loaded rifled mortar with an early form of horizontal sliding block breech that used separate loading propellant charges and projectiles. There were two types of mount one was a static fortress mount that had a round metal base that bolted to a concrete slab or a mobile siege mount that bolted to a rectangular wooden platform.

The upper part of both mounts was a wedge-shaped cradle constructed of riveted metal plates that held a trunnioned barrel. The U-shaped cradle allowed for high angles of elevation and was adjusted by a hand wheel on the side of the cradle that connected to a crescent-shaped elevation mechanism. Traverse was adjusted by a wooden pole that fit into a hole in the rear of the base and was levered into position. For transport, the mortar could either be transported attached to its wooden base or unmounted from its base. A pair of wheels were attached to an axle at the front and the rear was attached to a limber.

== Users ==
The 21 cm M1880 was used during the Balkan Wars and World War I by the Ottoman Empire. A number armed Ottoman forts in the Balkans and a few were captured during the Balkan Wars. It is unknown if Serbia, Bulgaria, Greece, or Montenegro continued to use the mortars they captured? It may have also seen action during the Italo-Turkish War of the same period. The 21 cm M1880 also armed Belgian and Romanian forts built before World War I and more than likely saw service during World War I.

== Gallery ==
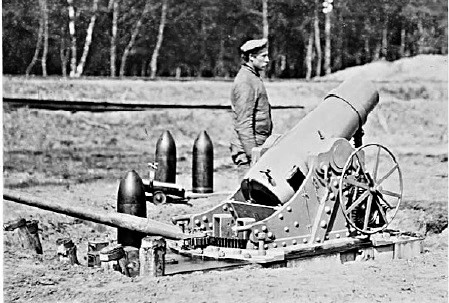
A 21 cm mortar with ammunition.

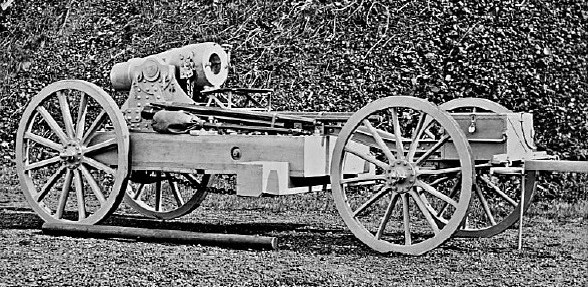
A 21 cm mortar on a 4 wheeled cart.

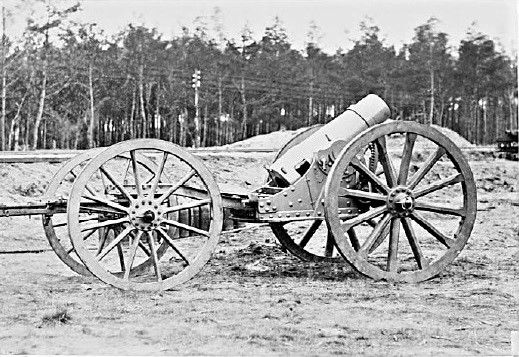
A 21 cm mortar attached to a limber for transport.

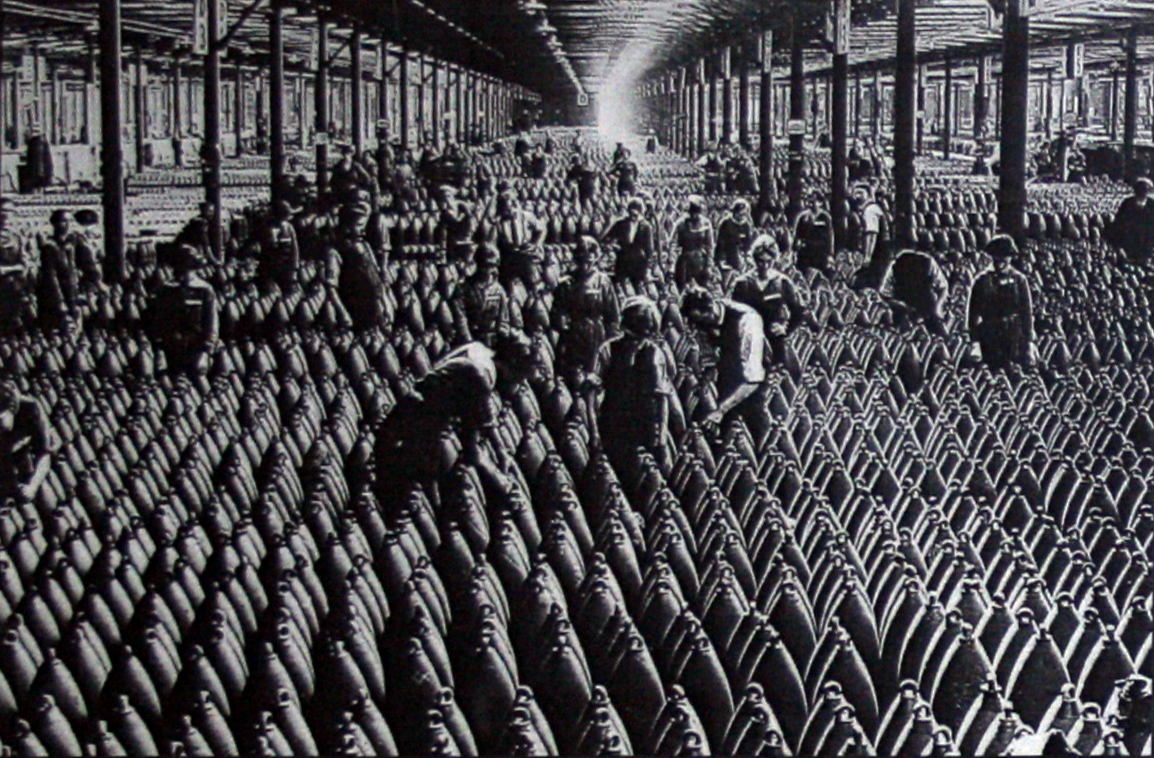
Stocks of projectiles in a Belgian factory.

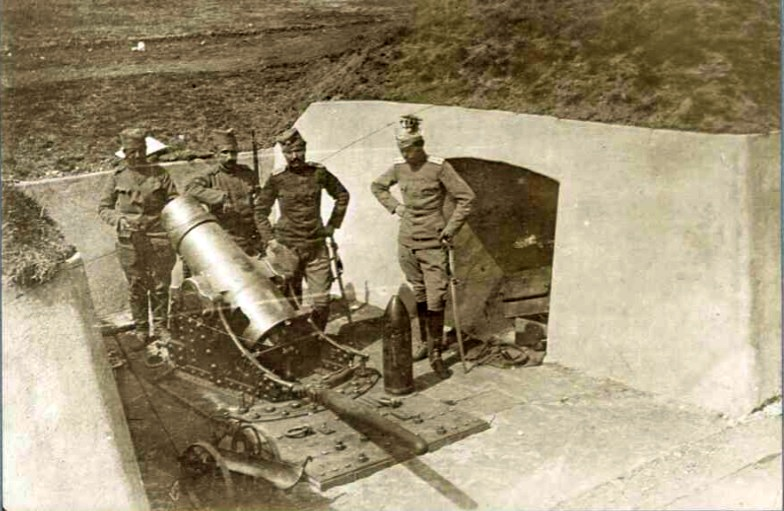
Serbian troops with a captured Ottoman 21 cm mortar during the 1st Balkan War.

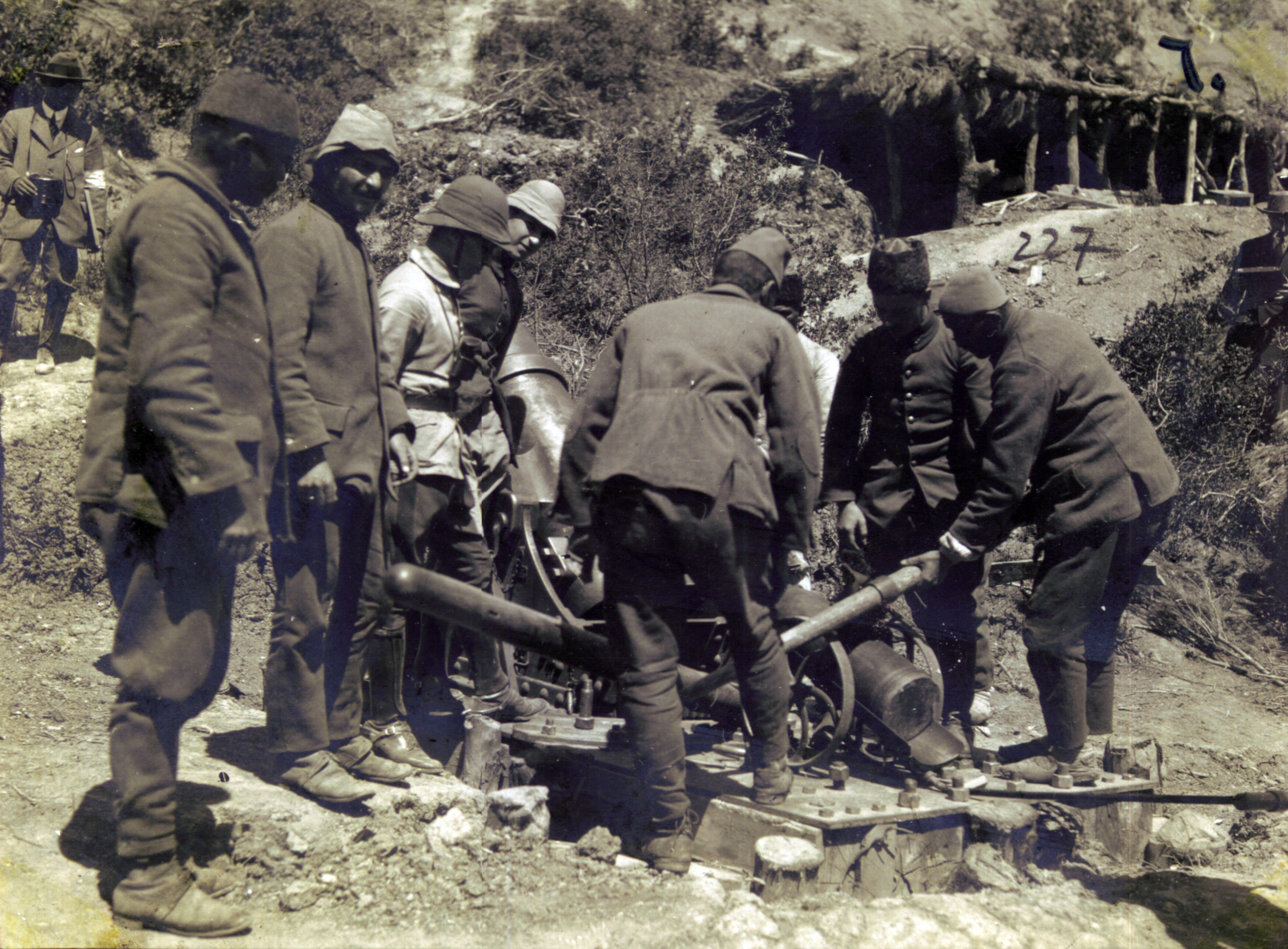
Ottoman troops loading a 21 cm mortar during World War I.

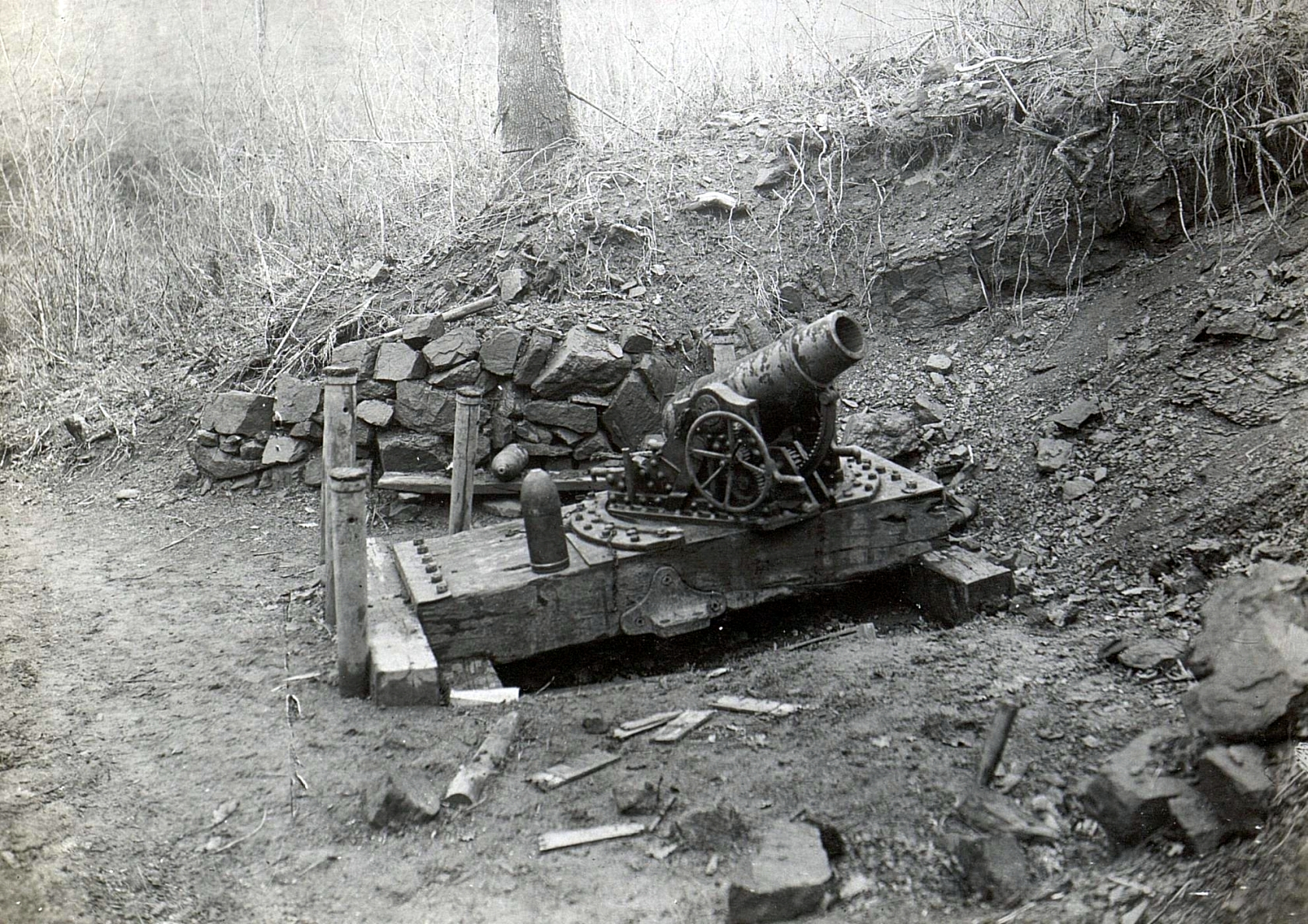
An Italian 15 cm mortar captured by Austro-Hungarian forces during World War I.

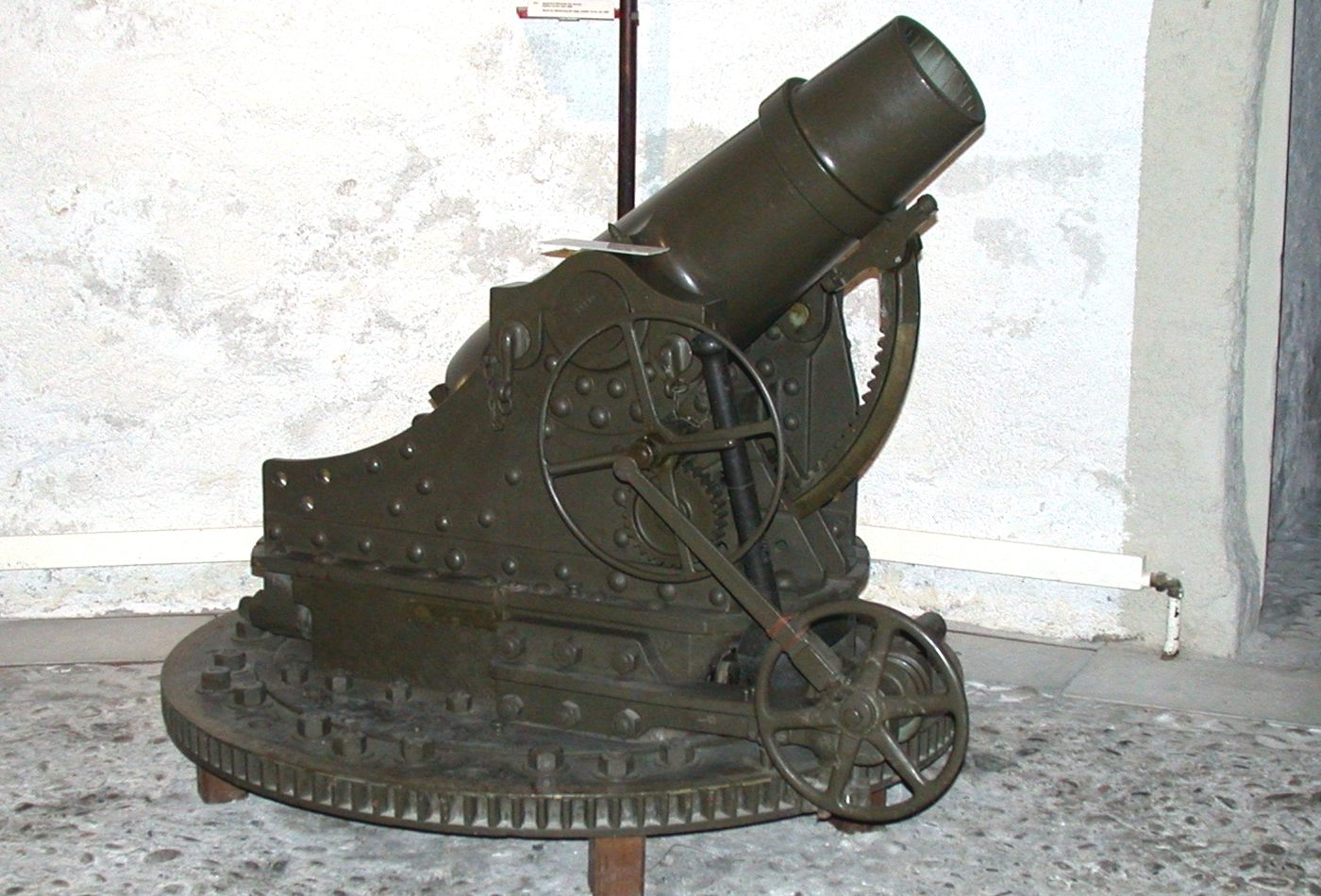
A Swiss 15 cm mortar at the Standort Musée Militaire Vaudois, Switzerland.
