= Konrád =

Konrád is a Hungarian, Czech and Slovak masculine given name and a surname (Czech and Slovak feminine: Konrádová). It is derived from the German names Konrad and Conrad, meaning 'bold counsel'. Notable people with the name include:

== Surname ==
- Branislav Konrád (born 1987), Slovak ice hockey player
- Ferenc Konrád (1945–2015), Hungarian water polo player
- György Konrád (1933–2019), Hungarian writer and sociologist
- János Konrád (1941–2014), Hungarian water polo player and swimmer
- Jenő Konrád (1894–1978), Hungarian football player and manager
- Kálmán Konrád (1896–1980), Hungarian footballer
- Karel Konrád (1899–1971), Czech writer and journalist

== Given name ==
- Conrad I, Duke of Bohemia (Czech: Konrád I. Brněnský; c. 1035 – 1092), ruler of Bohemia
- Conrad II, Duke of Bohemia (Czech: Konrád II. Ota; c. 1136 – 1191), ruler of Bohemia
- Conrad II of Znojmo (Czech: Konrád II. Znojemský; ?–1161), Bohemian prince
- Konrád Burchard-Bélaváry (1837–1916), Hungarian businessman and diplomat
- Konrád Nagy (born 1992), Hungarian speed skater

== See also ==
- Konráð Gíslason (1808–1891), Icelandic grammarian and philologist
