= Morges Castle =

Castle in Morges, Switzerland

- Château de Morges
- Morges in Switzerland
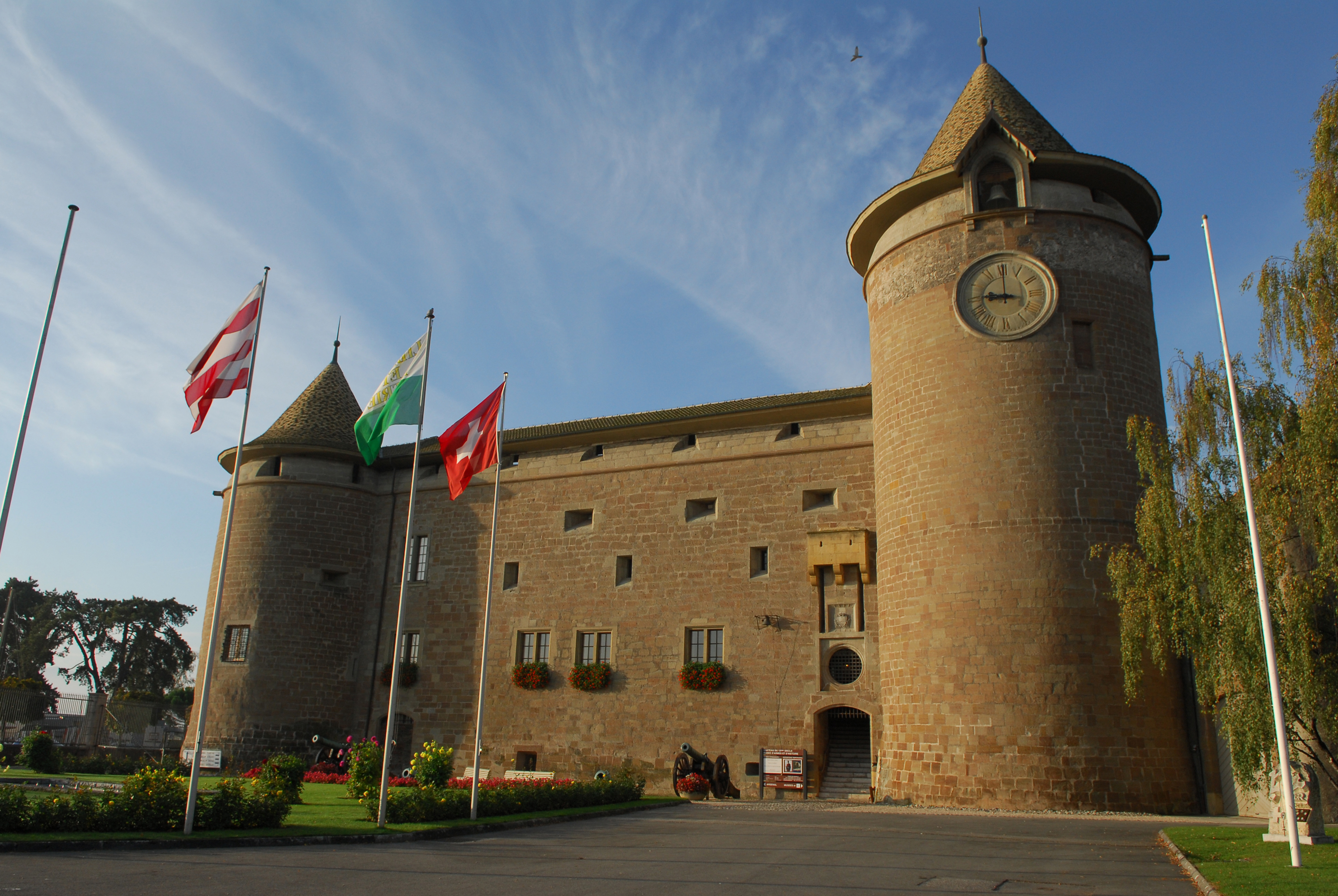
- Castle exterior

Site information
- Type: Castle
- Condition: Vaud Military Museum

Location
- Coordinates: 46°30′24″N 6°29′48″E

Site history
- Built: 13th century

Swiss Cultural Property of National Significance

Morges Castle (French: Château de Morges) is a medieval castle in the Swiss municipality of Morges in the canton of Vaud. It is a Swiss heritage site of national significance.

== History ==
In 1286, Louis of Savoy founded a city in a pasture where a gallows previously stood. A castle was built to protect the city, which quickly developed into an administrative and market center as well as a hub for transporting goods by land and sea.

The castle in the south of the town square was built with a square floor plan and four round corner towers. It resembles the castle of Yverdon, which may have served as a model for Morges Castle. One of the round towers, larger than the others, served as the main tower. The raised courtyard was covered during the Middle Ages by casemates, which were first mentioned in 1340. On the lake side, outside the castle walls, there was a fortified kitchen. This kitchen, which was unique in Switzerland, was attached to the exterior of the castle walls. In 1363, the kitchen was rebuilt. Following the conquest of Vaud by Bern, the roof of the kitchen became a firing platform and was later converted into an observation deck.

The city and castle were plundered in 1475 and again in 1530. After the conquest of Vaud in 1536 by Bern, Morges became the center of a bailiwick in 1539. The castle was at that time in a deplorable condition. The new owners had the upper half of the fortifications rebuilt in the 1540s to suit the needs of artillery. Since Morges had not surrendered quickly enough to Bern, the city gates were demolished. The gate houses remained until 1769 and 1803, when they were finally destroyed.

The castle, which became the cantonal armory in 1803, was expanded in 1836–39 with some utility buildings and damaged in an explosion in 1871. Starting in 1925, it housed the Vaud Military Museum.

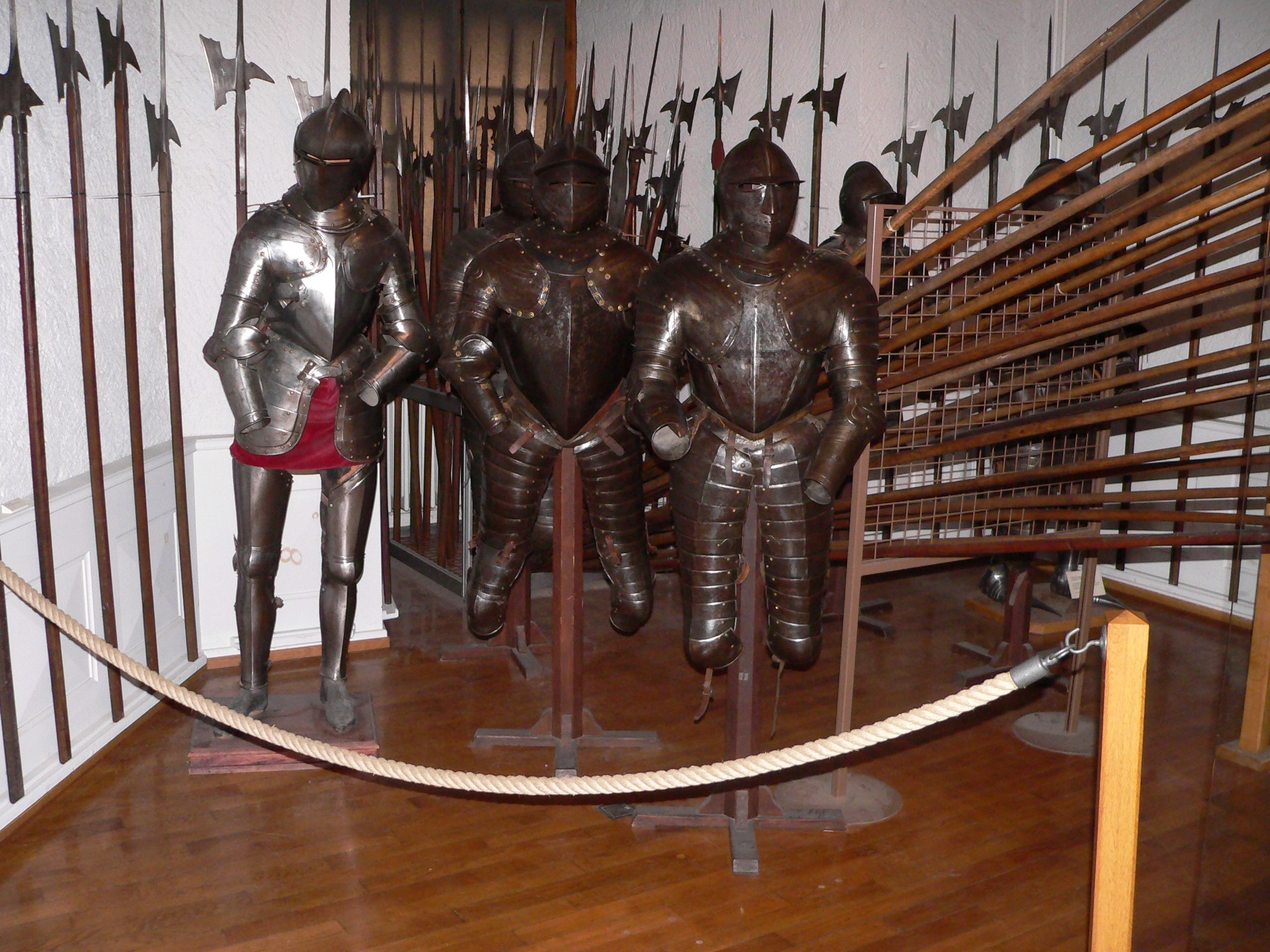
Medieval weapons and armor.

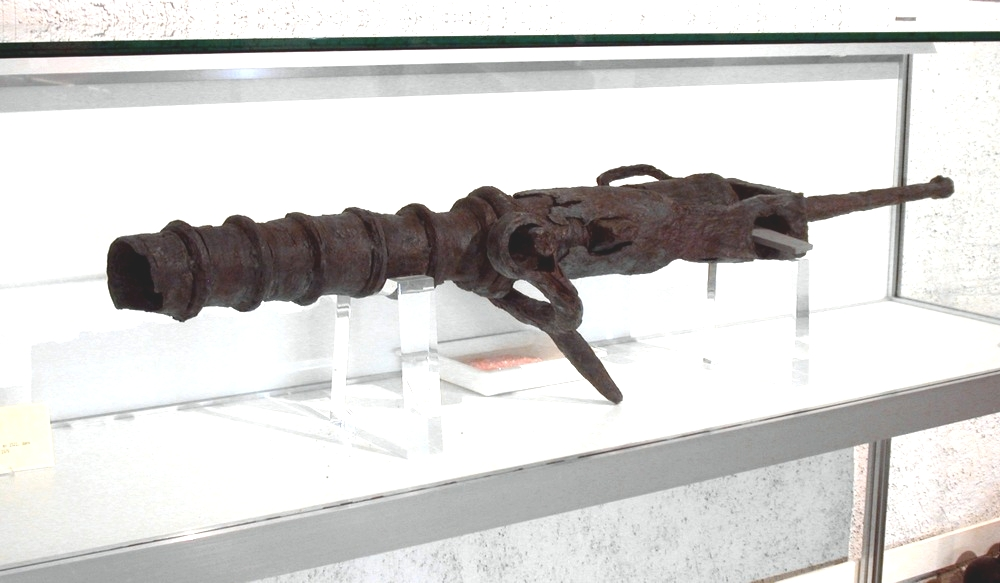
Early breach loader swivel gun.

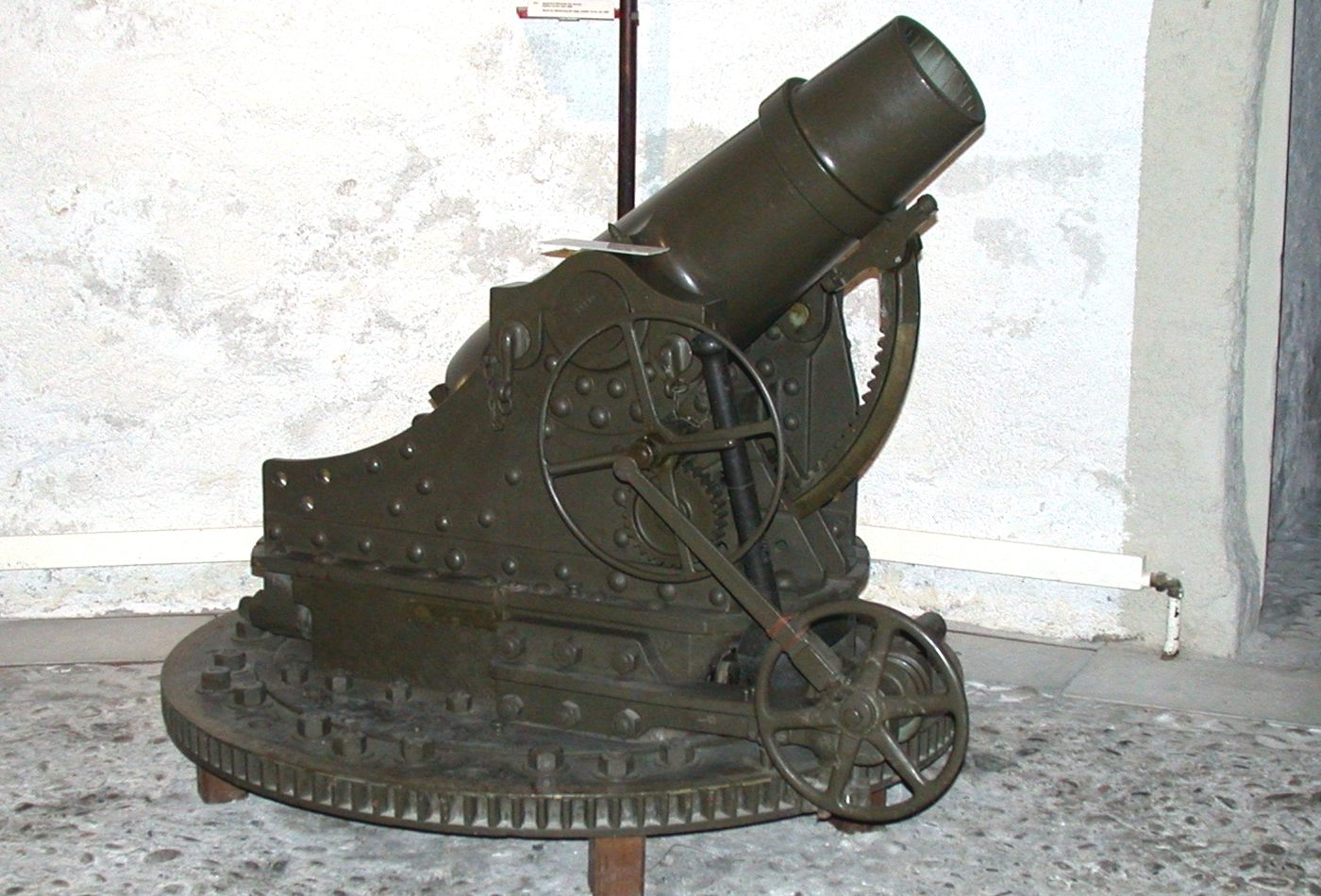
Swiss 15 cm Mortar Ord 1881 L/6.4

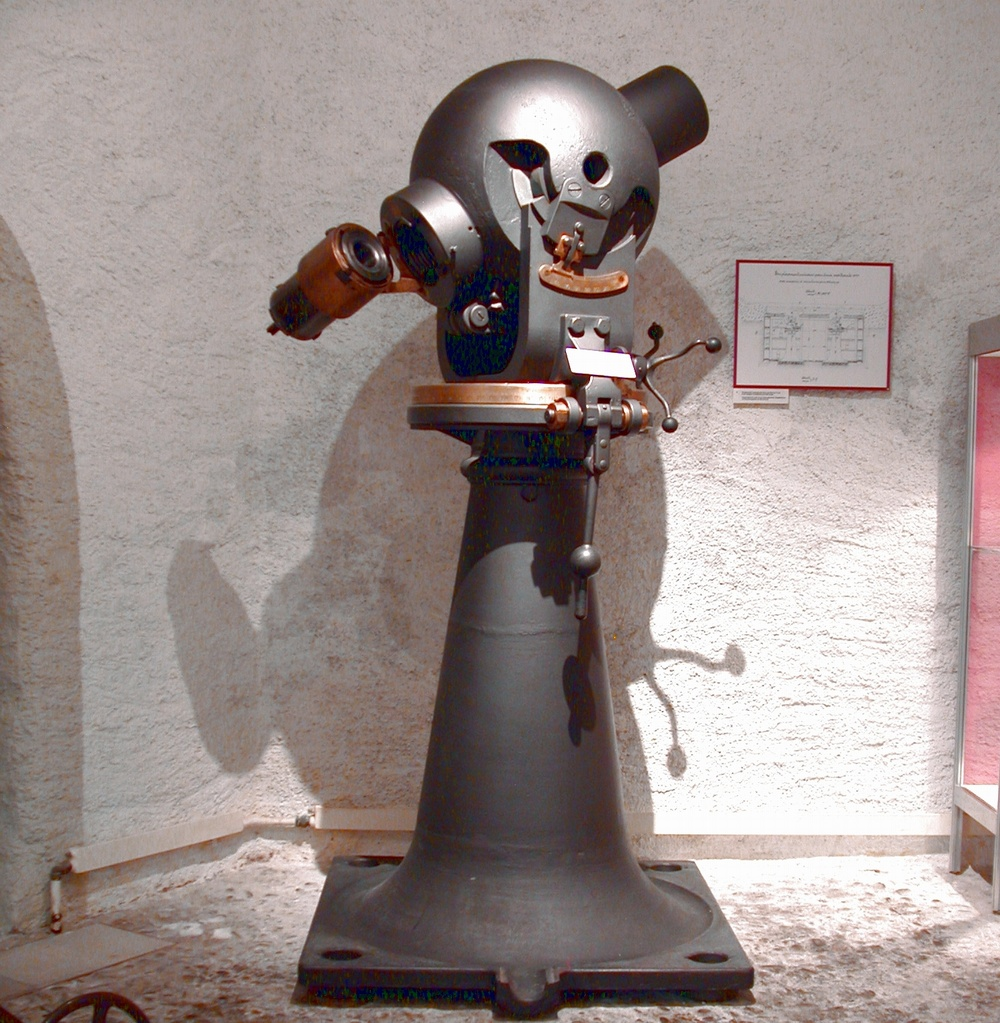
Mortar (Gotthard fortification) 12 cm Ord 1888.

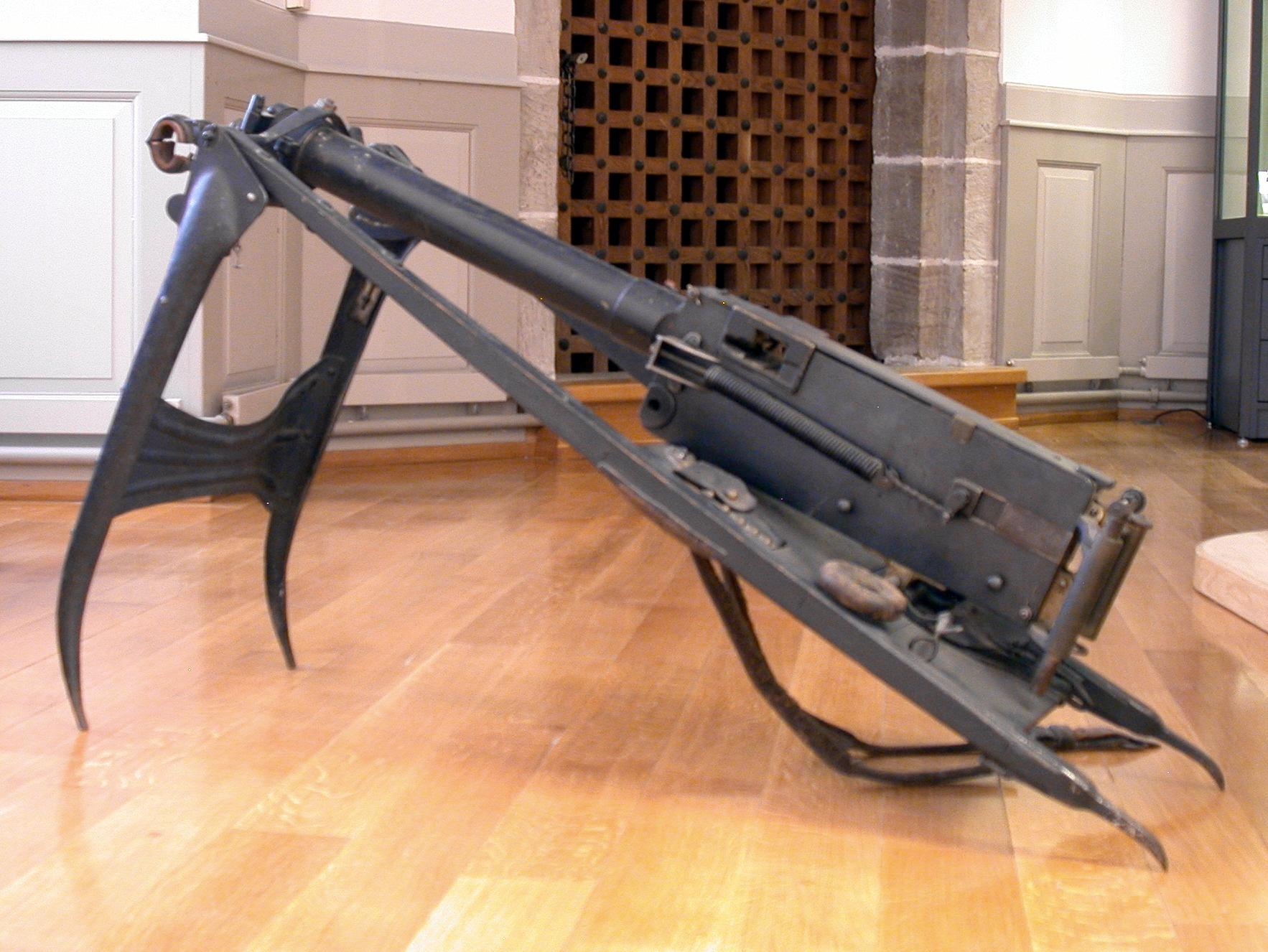
Model 1894 Maxim gun.

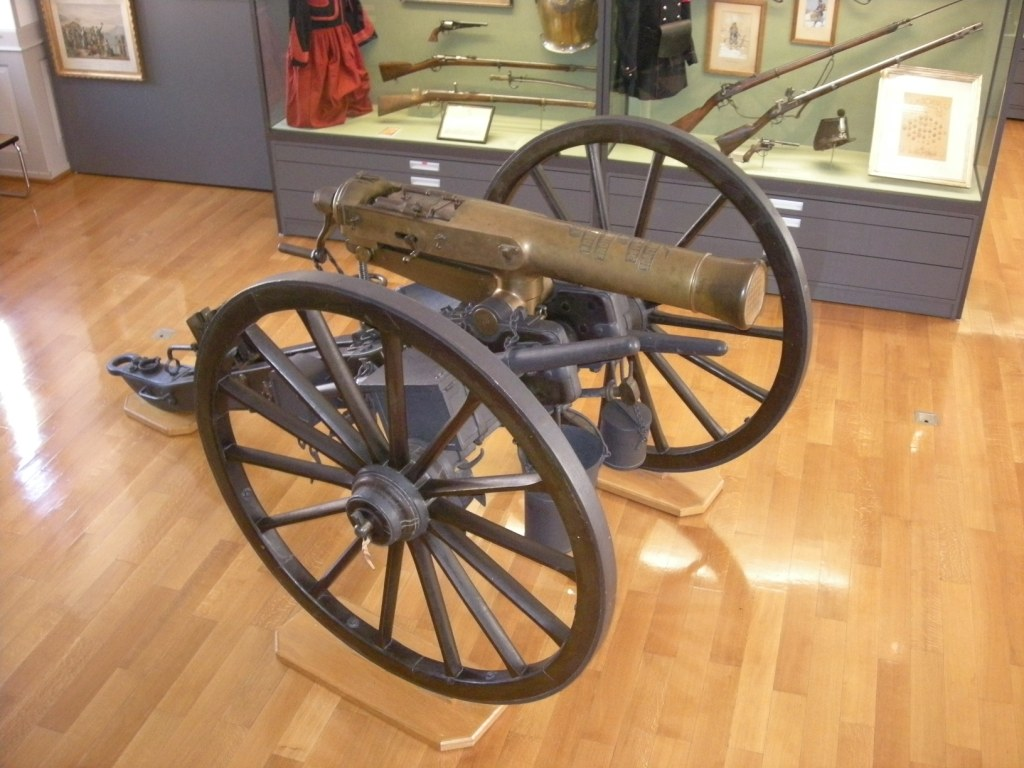
De Reffye Mitrailleuse.

== See also ==
- List of castles in Switzerland
- Château
- Morges
