= Corrado =

Corrado may refer to:

== Places ==
- Anticoli Corrado, comune in the City of Rome
- Monte Vidon Corrado, comune in the Province of Fermo

== People ==
=== Given name ===
- See Corrado (given name)

=== Surname ===
- Andrea Corrado (1873–1963), Italian ship owner
- Andrea Di Corrado (born 1988), Italian cyclist
- A. J. Corrado (born 1992), American former soccer player
- Carol Corrado, American economist
- Frank Corrado (born 1993), Canadian ice hockey player
- Giambono di Corrado (1400s), Italian painter
- Gino Corrado (1893–1982), Italian actor
- Kristin Corrado (born 1965), American politician
- Niccolò Corrado (born 2000), Italian football player
- Regina Corrado, American television writer
- Sebastian Corrado (died 1556), Italian grammarian

== Other ==
- Volkswagen Corrado, a Volkswagen sport compact car produced from 1988 until 1995
- Corrado (film), a film starring Johnny Messner and Tom Sizemore

== See also ==
- Corado, a surname
