= TU Braunschweig =

University in Germany

Technische Universität Braunschweig
- Former name: Collegium Carolinum
- Motto: Nec aspera terrent
- Motto in English: They are not terrified of the rough things
- Type: Public
- Established: 1745; 281 years ago
- Founder: Charles I, Duke of Brunswick-Wolfenbüttel
- Academic affiliations: TU9, CESAER, PEGASUS
- Budget: EUR 393 million
- President: Angela Ittel
- Academic staff: 2,060 and 242 professors
- Total staff: 3,795
- Students: 19,981
- Doctoral students: 2,223
- Location: Braunschweig, Lower Saxony, Germany; 52°16′25″N 10°31′47″E
- Website: tu-braunschweig.de
- Location within Germany Location within Lower Saxony

TU Braunschweig (German: Technische Universität Braunschweig) is the oldest technical university in Germany. It was founded in 1745 as Collegium Carolinum. It is a member of TU9, an incorporated society of the most renowned German institutes of technology. It is commonly ranked among the top engineering universities in Germany.

TU Braunschweig's research profile is very interdisciplinary, but with a focus on aeronautics, vehicle engineering including autonomous driving and electric mobility, manufacturing, life sciences, and metrology. Research is conducted in close collaboration with external organizations such as the German Aerospace Center (DLR), Helmholtz Centre for Infection Research, several Fraunhofer Institutes, and Germany's national metrology institute (Physikalisch-Technische Bundesanstalt, PTB), among many others. As one of very few research institutions of its type in the world, the university has its own research airport.

== Name ==
Its complete name is Technische Universität Braunschweig. Translating the name into English is discouraged by the university. While the adjective technische (English: technical) in its name implies a focus on science and engineering, it is still a university in the sense that it represents a wide range of subjects. It is subdivided into six faculties with different degree programmes and specialisations.

== Research ==
The TU Braunschweig focuses its research in four main areas: Future City, Metrology, Mobility and Engineering for Health. The university's researchers cooperate closely with other research institutions in Braunschweig.

=== Future City ===
The scientists at the TU Braunschweig are developing concepts for the intelligent future cities. The aim is to find solutions for efficient, eco-friendly, healthy, social and green Smart Cities.

=== Metrology ===
Nanoscale materials and components measuring only millionths of a millimetre have become indispensable in many procedures. Their measurement requires new approaches in nanometrology. The Laboratory for Emerging Nanometrology and Analytics (LENA) is investigating the limits of the measurable together with the Physikalisch-Technische Bundesanstalt.

=== Mobility ===
The researchers are working towards a multimodal mobility system. This focus bundles research in the automotive sector, aerospace technology and rail technology. Important topics are intelligent and interconnected mobility, low-emission vehicles using non-fossil energies and sustainable production. In addition, traffic management, logistics and social impacts are considered. Together with scientists from around the world, TU Braunschweig conduct research related to reducing traffic accidents. The researchers are developing novel materials and surfaces that help reduce fuel consumption and noise, and are developing next-generation energy sources. Interdisciplinary research is tied together in the NFL – Aeronautics Research Centre Niedersachsen (English: Lower Saxony) and the NFF – Automotive Research Centre Niedersachsen.

=== Engineering for Health ===
The Braunschweig Integrated Centre of Systems Biology (BRICS) combines natural sciences, engineering and information technology to systems biology. Together with the Helmholtz Centre for Infection Research and the Leibniz Institute DSMZ (German Collection of Microorganisms and Cell Cultures), strategies against infectious microorganisms are developed. This also includes natural substances consisting of microorganisms. The manufacturing and processing of these agents is the subject of the Center of Pharmaceutical Engineering (PVZ).

=== Research centres ===
In addition to the main areas of research, the research profile of the TU Braunschweig is shaped by several interdisciplinary and interdepartmental research associations, which are structured in research centres.

==== Battery Lab Factory (BLB) ====
BLB is a research centre of the TU Braunschweig. The centre is an interdisciplinary research platform for the development of production processes as well as diagnosis and simulation for current lithium-ion batteries and future battery technologies such as solid state and lithium-sulphur batteries. BLB unites 13 professorships from three universities (TU Braunschweig, TU Clausthal, Leibniz University Hannover) as well as battery experts from the PTB and integrates the necessary competences along the value chain for excellent R&D in the field of batteries in Lower Saxony.

==== Braunschweig Integrated Centre of Systems Biology (BRICS) ====
The BRICS is an interdisciplinary centre in cooperation with the Helmholtz Centre for Infection Research. Three departments of the Helmholtz Centre as well as institutes from three faculties of the TU Braunschweig work together. At BRICS, microorganisms in the fields of biotechnology and infection research are investigated using systems biology methods. Mathematical models will be used to develop new anti-infectives and new biotechnological production processes.

==== Laboratory for Emerging Nanometrology and Analytics (LENA) ====
In the Laboratory for Emerging Nanometrology, institutes of the TU Braunschweig conduct research together with departments of the Physikalisch-Technische Bundesanstalt. Research topics are nanonormals, method developments as well as ubiquitous sensors and standards. The focus is on the metrology of 3-dimensional Nano systems.

==== Automotive Research Centre Niedersachsen (NFF) ====
At the Automotive Research Centre Niedersachsen, scientists working on the Metropolitan Car are collaborating to find answers to the social and ecological challenges associated with increased urbanization. In addition to the TU Braunschweig, which plays a leading role, the German Aerospace Center (DLR) and Leibniz University Hannover are also involved.

==== Aeronautics Research Centre Niedersachsen (NFL) ====
The TU Braunschweig, the DLR and the Leibniz University Hannover are pooling their wide-ranging expertise in the Aeronautics Research Centre Niedersachsen to promote basic, coordinated research programmes in the field of aeronautics and space technology.

==== Center of Pharmaceutical Engineering (PVZ) ====
The researchers at PVZ want to make it possible to produce drugs that are more cost-effective and, for example, exactly tailored to the patient's needs. This aim is to be achieved with new manufacturing technologies. Experts from pharmacy, process engineering and micro technology are working together on a long-term basis in a model that is unique in Germany to date.

== Faculties and departments ==
The university has six faculties (German: Fakultäten). Some faculties are divided further into departments (German: Departments). All faculties are additionally divided into numerous institutes.

- Carl-Friedrich-Gauß-Faculty
  - Department of Mathematics
  - Department of Computer Science
  - Department of Business Administration and Economics
  - Department of Social Sciences
- Faculty of Life Sciences
- Faculty of Architecture, Civil Engineering and Environmental Sciences
  - Department of Architecture
  - Department of Civil Engineering and Environmental Science
- Faculty of Mechanical Engineering
- Faculty of Electrical Engineering, Information Technology, Physics
- Faculty of Humanities and Educational Sciences

== Rankings ==
University rankings

Overall – Global & National
QS World 2024	751–760	39
THE World 2024	501–600	42–45
ARWU World 2023	701–800	41–42

By subject – Global & National
QS Engineering – Mechanical 2023	151–200	8–10
THE General Engineering 2024	301–400	13–14

According to the QS World University Rankings for 2024, the university was placed within the 751–760 range globally, and ranked 39th nationally. In the 2024 Times Higher Education World University Rankings, it was positioned within the 501–600 global bracket, while holding a national rank between 42 and 45. The Academic Ranking of World Universities from 2023 indicates a global ranking between 701–800, and a national standing ranging from 41 to 42.

== Governmental testing and certification work ==
Commonly known in Germany, and particularly in the field of passive fire protection, as TU Braunschweig, its iBMB Institute has been accredited by the German Institute for Building Technology (Deutsches Institut für Bautechnik) and has, for decades, performed public testing for the purpose of establishing fire-resistance ratings of products and systems for manufacturers. iBMB also assists the DIBt in third-party vendor inspections (product certification) and quality control testing, in an effort to maintain DIBt approvals. iBMB was also instrumental in leading the Eureka project, which has become a guideline for building codes and regulations governing fire protection measures for traffic tunnels.

Special torsion test rig at iBMB / TU Braunschweig, for use in full-scale fire testing of passive fire protection systems

Full-scale floor furnace at iBMB / TU Braunschweig, for use in fire testing of passive fire protection systems

== Notable people ==
Current and former members of the TU Braunschweig include the mathematicians Carl Friedrich Gauss and Richard Dedekind, Nobel Prize laureates Klaus von Klitzing, Manfred Eigen, and Georg Wittig, aerospace engineer Adolf Busemann, the former CEOs of SAP, Metro Group, and Henkel (Henning Kagermann, Erwin Conradi, and Konrad Henkel), BMW CEO Harald Krüger, Porsche and Volkswagen CEO Oliver Blume, Airbus Defence and Space CEO Dirk Hoke, Siemens Mobility CEO Michael Peter, former Eurocopter CEO Lutz Bertling, and truck engineer and entrepreneur Heinrich Büssing founder of Büssing AG (merged with MAN), engineer and founder of Claas KGaA mbH August Claas and world-renowned architect Meinhard von Gerkan.
