= Corado =

Corado is a surname. Notable people with the surname include:

- Gastón Corado (born 1989), Argentine footballer
- María Gabriela Rivera Corado (born 2001), Guatemalan tennis player
- Ruby Corado, Salvadoran LGBT activist

== See also ==
- Corrado (disambiguation)
