= Demian Conrad =

Swiss graphic and visual arts designer

- Born: 1974 (age 51–52); Locarno, Switzerland
- Education: Visual Communication, SUPSI, Lugano
- Occupations: Graphic designer; creative director
- Employer: Automatico Studio
- Known for: design, visual identities, wayfinding, editorial design, exhibition design, author

Demian Conrad (born 1974) is a Swiss designer whose work ranges from graphic design to visual arts. Conrad is an author of books on design, and also the creative director of cultural institutions and firms, such as the Center for Future Publishing and DADADUM. He is also known for having invented a process named Water Random Offset Printer (WROP).

== Biography ==
Conrad was born in 1974 in Locarno. Hegraduated with a degree in Visual Communication from SUPSI in Lugano. During this period, he was a pupil of designer Bruno Monguzzi and artist Reto Rigassi. Later, he studied Lateral Thinking with Edward De Bono at the University of Malta. In 2003, he moved to Lausanne and in 2007 he founded the Demian Conrad Design Studio. In 2013, he founded the DADADUM furniture collection. Under Conrad's creative direction, DADADUM won several awards, including the ED Awards European Design. From 2014 to the present, Conrad has taught editorial design and has been a researcher at Haute Ecole d'Art et Design (HEAD) in Geneva, where, in 2017, he co-founded the Center for Future Publishing and became its creative director. In 2016, Conrad curated the visual identity for the campaign on the Swiss referendum in favor of a basic income (Basic Income Campaign), proposed by Generation Grundeinkommen. In 2017, the Art Directors Club awarded the Silver Cube Prize to the Basic Income Campaign. In the same year, Conrad renamed his atelier Automatico Studio and became a member of the Alliance Graphique Internationale (AGI).

== Design ==
Conrad has developed several visual communication strategies. From 2007 to 2015, he applied an experimental approach to graphic design, inspired by the masters of the Swiss School such as Max Bill as well as others such as Bruno Munari. In those years, he also approached participatory design, DIY ethics, design hacking, and algorithmic and parametric typography, experimenting with new ways of designing and producing works. In 2017, he elaborated a new approach aimed at reducing complexity and highlighting meaning, inspired by minimal art and some Japanese philosophies and close to the poetics of emptiness. Conrad also transfers these concepts into the currents of thought initiated by Emil Ruder, AG Fronzoni, and Georg Staehelin, from which he draws inspiration. His aesthetics focus on pure forms and typographic legibility, like the Univers font by Adrian Frutiger.

=== Research ===
Through his research Conrad develops visual and design grammars using new media and digital methods, such as generative typographic processes and digital visualizations based on algorithms and creative coding. In 2010, he developed a method, called Water Random Offset Printer (WROP), based on offset printing. This technique is borrowed from printers who wash up their machine after a job by squirting alcohol into the plates, to remove residual ink as the press is running. WROP allows the designer to interfere with the hydro and chemical settings of the machine while it is printing, altering standardized production through manual interventions which dilute the ink on the plates with water. Other techniques employed by Conrad in graphic design are based on his research on algorithmic and parametric typography. He also uses generative algorithms and artificial intelligence for the autonomous design of editorial and multimedia works, analyzing and interpreting, also in real-time, textual and visual data.

== Graphic artworks ==
Conrad's works focus on visual identity designs, wayfinding, editorial design, and exhibition design. During his career, he has worked for numerous cultural and artistic institutions.

=== Postage stamp centenary of the Swiss Civil Code ===
In 2012, he was commissioned by the Swiss Confederation to design the stamp for the centenary of the Swiss Civil Code (SCC). The visual syntax chosen by Conrad was intended to celebrate the Swiss code. He focused on the concept of good faith, which regulates and encourages citizens to use their freedom responsibly. This central concept of the SCC is expressed in Art. 2(1). He represented this concept on the stamp using the three official languages of the Confederation. His aim was to visually summarize this core value of the SCC on the stamp, as if it were a cut-out from the official book. For the occasion, he used a grey color, reminiscent of the cover color of the SCC, and the Times New Roman font, which also characterized the print editions of the SCC. A key feature of the stamp is the small size of its characters, which were designed to be read with a philatelic collector's lens. It is engraved. The stamp, which is in the commemorative and Priority Mail A category, was issued in Switzerland for one year for a total of 1.5 million printed copies. It was presented in 2012 to the Swiss Parliament in Bern by Simonetta Sommaruga, the former President of the Swiss Confederation.

=== LUFF 12 ===
In 2013, Conrad developed the communication campaign for the 12th Lausanne Underground Film & Music Festival (LUFF). The theme chosen for the festival was accident. Through a minimalist image, Conrad linked the contemporary film and music universe to the concept of randomness. The typographic strategy chosen by Conrad was to use monumental fonts, large enough to be recognizable and readable from a distance. The poster was designed to attract the attention of passers-by through a kinetic process, through which the message is first veiled and then revealed. The audience is hence stimulated through the figurative composition to explore the message. As for the typesetting, the text was divided into six lines, some of which were covered with black bands created with the WROP technique. The alternation of black and white bands recalls the relationship between control and randomness. Differently from previous works, the WROP printing technique was applied on pre-printed black text on white paper to partially veil it in a random way. This process was also used to cross out the word underground, a historical feature of LUFF's logo. The graphic work created for the campaign was displayed on the streets and public transports in Lausanne.

=== Art Basel ===
In 2014, Conrad was commissioned to design the campaign for Art Basel contemporary art fair. Conrad conveyed the fair's identity through a simple and immediate message. He focused on the relationship between color and identity. Influenced by the stylistic heritage of the Swiss fair, he created an identity based on the balance and contrast among colors. He paired two contrasting colors for each image; for instance, metallic colors were paired with fluorescent and vibrant ones. The screen-printing technique was used, allowing an increase of the density of the color making the surface more reflective and the contrasts more vivid. This created a contrast with the surrounding environment, which made the work more salient and easily decipherable.

=== Basic income ===
In 2016, Conrad designed the visual identity for the Swiss Basic Income Campaign proposed by Generation Grundeinkommen. His approach aimed at valuing beauty as a political message. He conceived a golden circle: "It is a symbol. An elegant, positive and feminine symbol that evokes a better society where wealth is better distributed. Above all, we wanted to make something beautiful. The concept of this campaign is that beauty can change the world", said Conrad for 24 heures. This work tries to highlight the evocative power of the sign reduced to its essence.

=== Artistes and robots ===
In 2017, during the International Exhibition in Kazakhstan, the Grand Palais in Paris, in collaboration with the Astana Contemporary Arts Center, launched an exhibition titled Artistes & Robots. This explored the relationship between artists and artificial intelligence. Together with the curator Jérôme Neutres and co-curator and artist Miguel Chevalier, Conrad designed the graphic communication of the exhibition, including the event identity, infographics, catalog, and communication campaign. Parametric algorithms were used to design the exhibition's editorial and multimedia work These algorithms were inspired by Donald Knuth's Metafont.

The design of the exhibition included explicit and implicit references to the human-machine relation theme. The installation called Responsive Typography and designed by Conrad welcomed the visitor through a dialogue with an algorithm. This human-machine dialogue takes place through the manipulation, in real time, of the characters of the words Artistes & Robots. Characters were displayed on a LED screen connected to a PC, which received signals about the visitors' positioning from an Xbox Kinect 360. This work includes a custom font, derived from a parametric generation process that was developed from hand drawings. The parametric font shape is the result of a process that transforms circular shapes into squares or rhombuses. To create this font, an application was developed in collaboration with Prototypo. This exhibition was presented at the Expo in 2017 in Astana before being brought to Paris in 2019.

== Collections ==
Conrad's works can be found in private and important museum collections, including the Museum of Design in Zürich, the Musée de Design et d'Arts Appliqués Contemporains in Lausanne, the National Library in Bern, and the Cantonal Library of Canton Vaud.

== Selected exhibitions ==
- 2011 The hand of graphic designer, curated by Francesca Serrazanetti & Matteo Schubert, Villa Necchi, Milan (Italy)
- 2012 100 Jahre Schweizer Grafik, curated by Karin Gimmi e Barbara Junod, Museum für Gestaltung, Zurigo (Swiss)
- 2013 Un/Limited, curated by Thibaud Tissot, Museum of Fine Arts, Le Locle (Swiss)
- 2014 Schweiz – Japan, curated by Stephanie Cuérel & Josh Schaub, Weltformat Graphic Design Festival, Lucerne (Swiss)
- 2016 Swiss Graphic Design Exhibition, curated by Erich Brechbühl, Noël Leu & Anna-Viktoria Eschbach, Crafts Museum of China Academy of Art, Shanghai (China)
- 2017 Who the hell is Mr Brockmann?, curated by David Kilian Beck, Ambit gallery, London (United Kingdom)
- 2017 Artists and Robots, curated by Jérôme Neutres & Miguel Chevallier, Astana (Kazakhstan)
- 2018 Art imprimé, curated by Nathalie Herschdorfer, Triennal of Contemporary Prints, Le Locle (Swiss)
- 2018 Artistes et robots, curated by Laurence Bertrand-Dorléac & Jérôme Neutres, Grand Palais de Paris, Paris (France)
- 2019 Millennials – New Millennium Design, curated by José Bártolo, Porto Design Biennial, Porto (Portugal)
- 2020 Code/Poésie, curated by Antonio Rodriguez, Chateaux de Morges (Swiss)
- 2020 Offsetdruck-Unikate, curated by Johannes Nilo, Unternehmen Mitte, Basel (Swiss)
- 2021 Rock Me Baby, curated by Sébastien Mettraux, Centre d'Art Contemporain, Yverdon-Les-Bains (Swiss)

== Books and articles ==
- Famous ordinary things, Demian Conrad & Rob Van Leijsen, DABOOK, 2016.
- "Johannes & Alan. A workshop of algorithmic typography", Demian Conrad, Issue, Journal of art & design HEAD – Genève, 2020, https://issue-journal.ch/flux-posts/johannes-alan/
- Who the Hell Is Müller-Brockmann?: Conversations About the Swiss Style, Demian Conrad, Arthur Niggli, 2021, ISBN 9783721210071
- Graphic Design in the Post-Digital Age: A Survey of Practices Fueled by Creative Coding, Demian Conrad, Rob van Leijsen & David Héritier, Onomomatopee, 2022, ISBN 978-94-93148-68-0

== See also ==
- Alliance Graphique Internationale (AGI) – International organization of graphic artists and designers
- Forum des 100
