= Kuno (given name) =

Male given name

- Gender: Male

Kuno is an Estonian and German male given name, derived from medieval diminutive forms of Conrad.

People named Kuno include:

- Kuno of Öhningen (d. 997), duke of Swabia
- Kuno II von Falkenstein (1320–1388), archbishop of Trier
- Kuno Becker (born 1978), Mexican actor
- Kuno-Hans von Both (1884–1955), German military commander
- Kuno von Eltz-Rübenach (1904-1945), Nazi member of the German Reichstag
- Kuno Fencker (born 1974), Greenlandic politician
- Kuno Fischer (1824–1907), German philosopher and historian
- Kuno Francke (1855–1930), German-American historian
- Kuno Goda, German artist
- Kuno Gonschior (1933–2010), German painter
- Kuno Klötzer (1922–2011), German football coach
- Kuno von Klebelsberg (1875–1932), Hungarian politician
- Kuno Lorenz (born 1932), German philosopher
- Kuno Meyer (1858–1919), German linguist
- Kuno von Meyer (1913–2010), German military commander
- Kuno von Moltke (1847–1923), German military commander
- Kuno Pajula (1924–2012), Estonian clergyman
- Kuno Raude (born 1941), Estonian architect and politician
- Kuno Sekulic (born 1961), Austrian ice hockey player
- Kuno von Steuben (1855–1935), German military commander
- Kuno von Stoffeln (1379-1411), German abbot
- Kuno H. Struck (1883-1947), American medical doctor and bank executive
- Kuno Thomasson (1923–2007), Estonian-Swedish phycologist, hydrobiologist and ecologist
- Kuno Todeson (1924–2022), Estonian politician
- Kuno Veeber (1898–1929), Estonian painter
- Kuno Werner (1925-2004), East German cross-country skier and biathlete
- Kuno von Westarp (1864–1945), German politician
- Kuno Wittmer (born 1982), Canadian race car driver
