= Conrads =

Conrads is a surname. Notable people with the name include:

- Carl Conrads (1839–1920), American sculptor
- Heinz Conrads (1913–1986), Austrian actor
- Randy Conrads, founder of Classmates.com

== See also ==
- Konrads (disambiguation), includes a list of people with the name Konrads
- Conrad (name), given name and surname
