= Erwin Conradi =

Erwin Conradi (* February 12, 1935, Frankfurt am Main) was as head of Metro AG one of the most important managers in trade business.

He studied industrial engineering, then worked from 1959 at IBM and from 1963 at Metro.

From 1996 until 2000 he was chairman of the board, after Kaufhaus, Asco and Cash & Carry had merged into Metro AG. 2004 he left Metro AG. In 1999 he received an honorary doctor from TU Braunschweig.

== See also ==
- Conradi
