= Konrads =

Konrads may refer to:

- The Konrads, a band formed by David Bowie in 1962

== People with the surname Konrads ==
- Ilsa Konrads, Australian swimmer at the 1960 Olympics
- John Konrads, Australian swimmer at the 1960 Olympics

== People with the given name Konrāds ==
- Konrāds Kalējs, WWII Latvian soldier, Nazi collaborator
- Konrāds Ubāns (1893–1981), Latvian painter

== See also ==
- Conrads (disambiguation)
- Konrad (disambiguation)
