= Edmond Konrad =

Edmond George Konrad
- Born: March 6, 1909; Oshkosh, Wisconsin
- Died: March 5, 1997 (aged 87)
- Relatives: Michael Warren Konrad (son), Michele Konrad (granddaughter)
- Military career
- Allegiance: United States
- Branch: United States Navy
- Service years: 1932–1959
- Rank: Rear Admiral
- Nickname: Ed
- Commands: Air Group Seventeen
- Conflicts: World War II
- Awards: Navy Cross (2); Silver Star

Edmond G. Konrad (March 6, 1909 – March 5, 1997) was a Rear Admiral in the United States Navy. Konrad was a graduate of the United States Naval Academy, Class of 1932. During the early 1940s he served on the carrier USS Wasp and from 1942 to 1943 trained pilots at Cecil Field in Florida.

While a Commander serving aboard the carrier Hornet (CV-12) during World War II, Konrad was twice awarded the Navy Cross and was also awarded the Silver Star.

His first Navy Cross citation reads:

The President of the United States of America takes pleasure in presenting the Navy Cross to Commander Edmond George Konrad (NSN: 0-71544), United States Navy, for extraordinary heroism in operations against the enemy while serving as Pilot of a carrier-based Navy Plane and Commander of Air Group SEVENTEEN (AG-17), attached to the U.S.S. HORNET (CV-12), during an attack on major units of the enemy Fleet and strong harbor defense installations in the Kure Bay Area of Honshū, Japan, on 19 March 1945. Flying a fighter plane, Commander Konrad led his group into the attack through extremely intense anti-aircraft fire, inflicting severe damage upon the harbor installations, and sinking several merchant vessels. Under his gallant leadership and direction, numerous bomb hits were scored on a battleship, a large aircraft carrier, a small carrier, two cruisers, and two destroyers. His devotion to duty were in keeping with the highest traditions of the United States Naval Service.

His second Navy Cross citation reads:

The President of the United States of America takes pleasure in presenting a Gold Star in lieu of a Second Award of the Navy Cross to Commander Edmond George Konrad (NSN: 0-71544), United States Navy, for extraordinary heroism in operations against the enemy while serving as Pilot of a carrier-based Navy Plane and Commander of Air Group SEVENTEEN (AG-17), attached to the U.S.S. HORNET (CV-12), during an attack against an enemy surface Force in the East China Sea, on 7 April 1945. When the air coordinator for our Task Group was forced to return to base, Commander Konrad assumed command and, despite adverse weather conditions which compelled him to circle the target area at low altitude in range of intense anti-aircraft fire, directed a series of successful attacks in which numerous torpedo and bomb hits were scored on a battleship, a cruiser and four destroyers, all of which eventually sank. His leadership, courage and devotion to duty upheld the highest traditions of the United States Naval Service.

His Silver Star citation reads:

The President of the United States of America takes pleasure in presenting the Silver Star to Commander Edmond George Konrad (NSN: 0-71544), United States Navy, for conspicuous gallantry and intrepidity in operations against the enemy while serving as Pilot of a carrier-based Navy Plane and Commander of Air Group SEVENTEEN (AG-17), attached to the U.S.S. HORNET (CV-12), in action against enemy Japanese forces in the vicinity of Kyūshū, Japan, on 14 May 1945. Leading the first attack of carrier-based bomber, torpedo and fighter planes against the Kumamoto bomber aircraft factory and assembly plant while he was serving as Air Coordinator for his Task Group, Commander Konrad first reconnoitered the plant with a division of planes to obtain photographs of its installations and information of military value and, rejoining his flight in the face of anti-aircraft fire, directed the group in inflicting extensive damage on the factory and assembly buildings. After the attack, he led a division back over the area to obtain damage assessment photographs and, during the return to his carrier, launched a strike on a smaller factory and hydroelectric plant, inflicting serious damage and starting numerous fires. By his superior airmanship and gallant devotion to duty, Commander Konrad contributed greatly to the success of the mission and upheld the highest tradition of the United States Naval Service.
