= Deborah Vietor-Engländer =

British literary scholar (b. 1946)

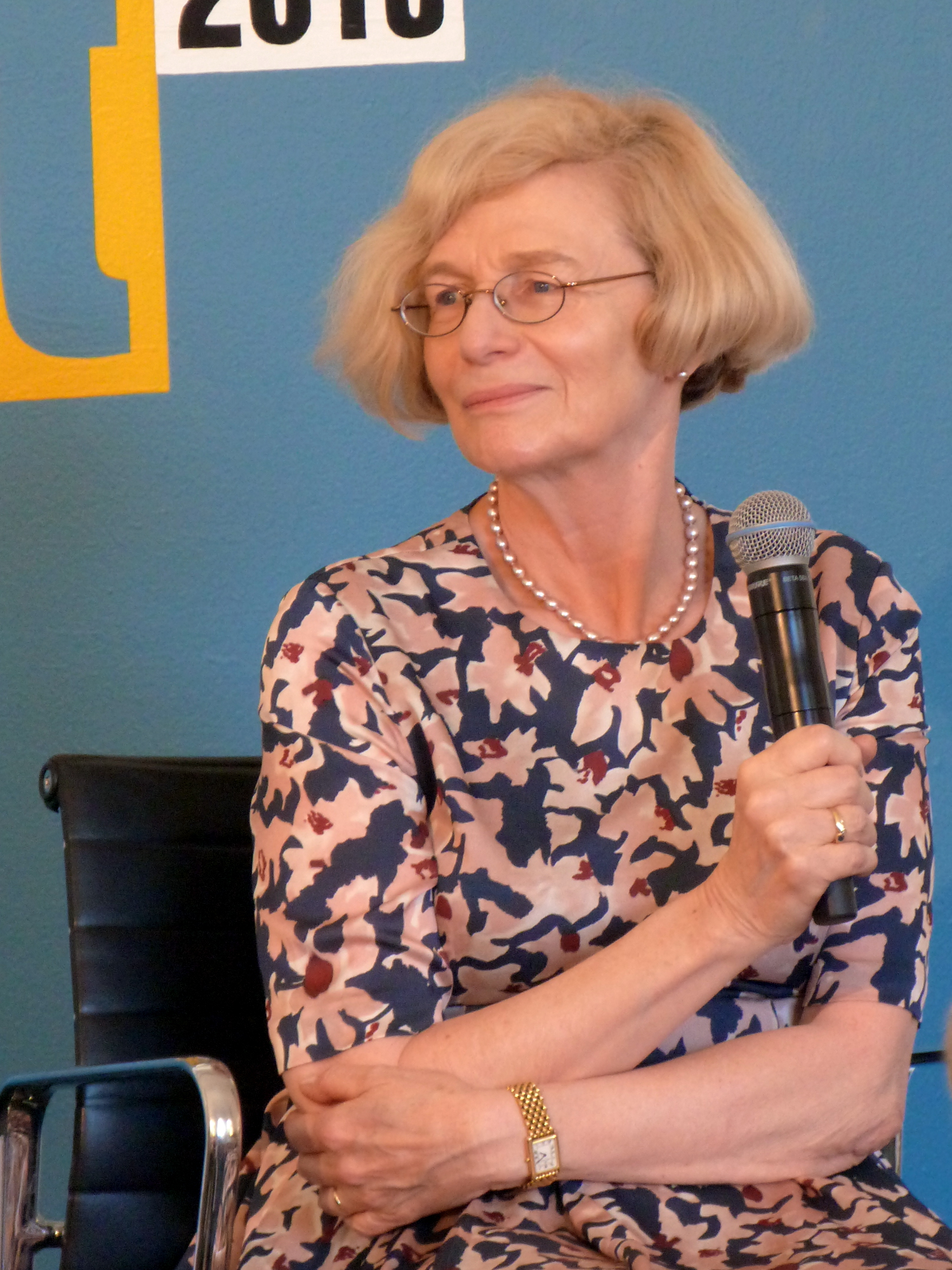
Deborah Vietor-Engländer (2016)

Deborah Judith Vietor-Engländer (born 1946) is a British literary scholar.

== Life ==
Vietor-Engländer was born in London. Her father fled Prague in 1939 and found refuge in Great Britain; her sister, Shulamit Engländer Amir, was rescued by Nicholas Winton on the 1939 Children's Transport to London. Vietor-Engländer studied German and French at University College London (B.A.). She then worked as a freelance writer for the BBC German Service and taught at the Polytechnic of Central London. She worked for the Fontane letter edition and wrote her doctoral thesis on Faust in the GDR under Walter Jens at the Eberhard Karls Universität Tübingen. Married, one daughter.

From 1972 to 1992, she had a position teaching at the Saarland University and then at the Technische Universität Darmstadt until 2007.

Numerous publications on the problems of exile and the Shoah, including Yiddish in English, on the authors Lion Feuchtwanger, Heinrich Mann, Friedrich Torberg, Hermynia Zur Mühlen and Arnold Zweig. Editor of The Legacy of Exile (1998), the series Jewish Library and Exile Documents and the volumes Sucher und Selige (2009) and Das war meine Zeit (2013) as part of the Alfred Kerr-Werkausgabe published by S. Fischer Verlag. She is the complete editor of the three-volume edition of works by Hermann Sinsheimer, Volume I, 2013. In 2016, her great Alfred Kerr biography was published by Rowohlt (720 pages). She edited four volumes of Alfred Kerr's Berliner Briefe published in 2021.

Vietor-Engländer was Vice-Chairman of the International Arnold Zweig Society from 1991 to 1996 and then its Chairman until 2002. She has been President of the Alfred Kerr Foundation since May 2017. Since 2020, she has been on the board of directors of the P.E.N. Centre of German-Speaking Writers Abroad.

== Publications ==
- Faust in der DDR. Lang, Frankfurt, 1987, also a dissertation, Universität Tübingen 1986.
- The Legacy of exile: Lives, Letters, Literature. Blackwell, Oxford 1998.
- with Eckart Früh, Ursula Seeber (ed.): Hermynia Zur Mühlen: Vierzehn Nothelfer und andere Romane aus dem Exil. 2 volumes. Peter Lang, Bern 2002.

Alfred Kerr – Die Biographie. Rowohlt Verlag, Berlin 2016, ISBN 978-3-498-07066-3.

=== Editor ===
- (ed.): Alfred Kerr: Sucher und Selige, Moralisten und Büßer. Literarische Ermittlungen. S. Fischer, Frankfurt 2009.
- (ed.): Exil im Nebelland: Elisabeth Castoniers Briefe an Mary Tucholsky. Eine Chronik. Peter Lang, Bern 2010, ISBN 978-3-03910-037-8.
- Hermann Sinsheimers deutsch-jüdisches Schicksal. In Kerstin Schoor (ed.): Zwischen Rassenhass und Identitätssuche. Deutsch-jüdische literarische Kultur im nationalsozialistischen Deutschland. Wallstein, Göttingen 2010, ISBN 978-3-8353-0648-6, pp. 285–303.
- (ed.): Hermann Sinsheimer: Gelebt im Paradies. Verlag für Berlin-Brandenburg, 2013.
- (ed.): Alfred Kerr: Das war meine Zeit: Erstrittenes und Durchlebtes. S. Fischer, Frankfurt, 2013.
- (ed.): Hermann Sinsheimer: `Shylock´ Quintus-Verlag 2017, ISBN 978-3-945256-10-7.
- (ed.): Alfred Kerr: Was ist der Mensch in Berlin. Briefe eines europäischen Flaneurs, Aufbau-Verlag Berlin 2017. ISBN 978- 3-351-03692-8
- (ed.): Hermann Sinsheimer, Was ich lebte, was ich sah. Briefe und Theaterkritiken Quintus-Verlag 2020
- (ed.). Alfred Kerr Berlin wird Berlin Briefe aus der Reichshauptstadt 1897-1922 four Volumes Wallstein Verlag, Göttingen 2021, ISBN 978-3-8353-3862-3
