= Sebastian Corrado =

Sebastian Corrado (Latin: Sebastianus Corradus) was a 16th-century Italian grammarian who taught Greek and Latin and formed an academy at Reggio. Among his students was Guido Panciroli. He later went to Bologna to become professor of Greek and Latin. Corrado wrote several works, including Quaestura in qua Ciceronis Vita refertur, De Lingua Latina, and a life of Virgil; he also translated Plato into Latin. He died in 1556.
