= Robert Conrad (disambiguation) =

Robert Conrad (1935–2020) was an American film and television actor.

Robert Conrad may also refer to:

- Robert Dexter Conrad (1905–1949), U.S. Navy officer
- Robert J. Conrad (born 1958), U.S. federal judge
- Robert T. Conrad (1810–1858), mayor of Philadelphia
- USNS Robert D. Conrad, the lead ship of the Robert D. Conrad-class oceanographic research ships

== See also ==
- Conrad Roberts, American film and television actor
- Robert Conrad Hahn (1921–1996), American politician from Massachusetts
- Bobby Joe Conrad (born 1935), American football player
