= Michaela Konrad =

Austrian illustrator and artist

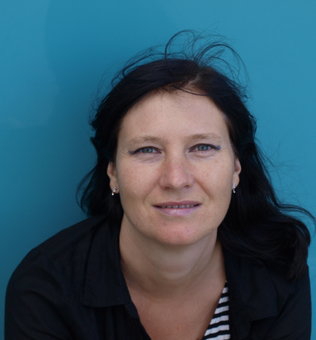
Michaela Konrad, (2012)

Michaela Konrad (born 4 October 1972 in Graz) is an Austrian illustrator and artist.

== Life and career ==
Michaela Konrad works in Santa Cruz de Tenerife and Vienna. After studying at the University of Applied Arts, she began her Spacelove project. This includes paintings, limited-edition screen and offset printing, and comic books. In the course of her exhibition entitled Comic Impacts Art at the Baroque Palace in Timișoara, Romania, she began a collaboration with the Romanian multi-media artist Daniel Dorobantu. Together they produced the multimedia comic installation Memories of Now, a Nextcomic- and Ars Electronica project. The Picasso comic animation On the Beach, which she created with Eugen Neacsu and Octavian Horvath, has been featured at the Ars Electronica Center since March 2013.

== Style ==
Konrad's drawing style is reduced to the essentials. She has the objective of making a connection between art and comics. Her book Mondwandler received the following reviews:

"The combination of powerfully luminous and arresting colours in front of black and grey backgrounds skilfully visualises the dissonance between a lifeless planet and the astronauts' urge to explore, born out of human vitality."

"One is only too willing to let oneself be swept along this peaceful river, and at a certain point one begins to sense in one's own body the weightlessness, emptiness, and silence of the cosmos."

"A successful book that tells what happened to the men who became acquainted with the Moon."

"One essentially floats through space while reading."
