= Peter Conrad =

Peter Conrad may refer to:

- Pete Conrad (1930–1999), United States astronaut
- Peter Conrad (academic) (born 1948), Australian academic long resident in the United Kingdom
- Peter Conrad (sociologist) (1945–2024), American academic, author, and professor at Brandeis University

== See also ==
- Peter Conradi (born 1960), British author and journalist who is Deputy Foreign Editor of the Sunday Times
- Peter J. Conradi (born 1945), British author, journalist, and biographer
