= Coenred =

Coenred or Cenred may refer to:

- King Coenred of Mercia
- King Coenred of Northumbria
- Coenred of Wessex, father of King Ine of Wessex
- MV Cenred, a vehicle and passenger ferry
