= Chris Conrad =

Chris Conrad may refer to:

- Chris Conrad (actor) (born 1970), American actor
- Chris Conrad (American football) (born 1975), American football player
- Chris Conrad (author) (born 1953), American author and activist

== See also ==
- Chris and Conrad, an American contemporary Christian music duo
