= Kuno Todeson =

Estonian politician (1924–2022)

Member of the Supreme Soviet of the Estonian Soviet Socialist Republic
- In office 1967–1990

Personal details
- Born: 26 May 1924 Tallinn, Estonia
- Died: 6 May 2022 (aged 97)
- Party: CPSU

Kuno Todeson (26 May 1924 – 6 May 2022) was an Estonian politician. A member of the Communist Party of the Soviet Union, he served in the Supreme Soviet of the Estonian Soviet Socialist Republic from 1967 to 1990. He died on 6 May 2022 at the age of 97.
