= 15 cm Mörser M1881 =

15 cm Festungs und Belagerungs Mörser M1881
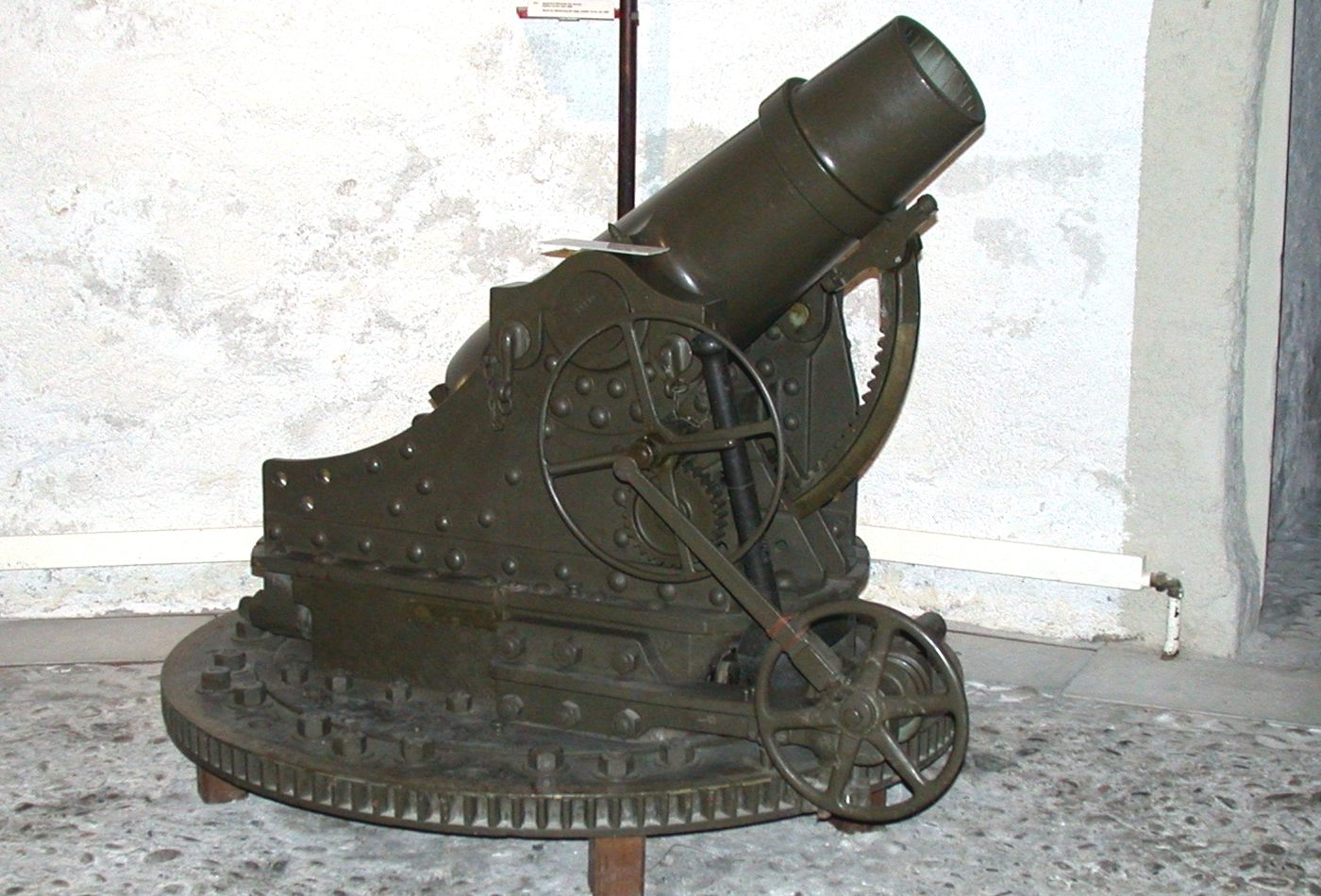
- A Swiss 15 cm mortar at the Standort Musée Militaire Vaudois, Switzerland.
- Type: Heavy mortar
- Place of origin: German Empire

Service history
- In service: 1880-?
- Used by: Kingdom of Italy; Ottoman Empire; Switzerland
- Wars: Italo-Turkish War; Balkan Wars; World War I

Production history
- Designer: Krupp
- Designed: 1880
- Manufacturer: Krupp
- Produced: 1880-1900
- Variants: 7.5 cm, 8.7 cm, 10.6 cm, 12 cm, 21 cm, 24 cm

Specifications
- Mass: Barrel: 360 kg (790 lb); Carriage: 370 kg (820 lb)
- Barrel length: 985 mm (3 ft 2.8 in) L/6.4
- Shell: Separate loading charges and 31.5 kg (69 lb) projectile
- Caliber: 149.7 mm (5.89 in)
- Breech: Horizontal sliding block
- Recoil: None
- Elevation: +15° to +60°
- Traverse: 120°
- Muzzle velocity: 200 m/s (660 ft/s)
- Effective firing range: 3.5 km (2.2 mi)

The 15 cm Festungs und Belagerungs Mörser M1881 or (15 cm Fortress and Siege Mortar M1881 in English) was a heavy mortar designed by Krupp that armed several European countries before and during World War I.

== Background ==
During the second half of the 1800s, several military conflicts changed the balance of power in Europe and set off an arms race leading up to World War I. A company that profited from this arms race was the Friedrich Krupp Company of Essen Germany and several European countries were armed with Krupp artillery. Some customers like Belgium, Italy, Romania, and Russia imported and built Krupp designs under license while others like the Ottoman Empire and Bulgaria lacking industrial capacity imported Krupp weapons.

== Design ==
The majority of military planners before World War I were wedded to the concept of fighting an offensive war of rapid maneuver that before mechanization meant a focus on cavalry and light horse artillery firing shrapnel shells at formations of troops in the open. This focus on quick firing light horse artillery meant that the use of mortars declined before World War I. However, Krupp continued to produce a range of siege mortars including 7.5 cm, 8.7 cm, 10.6 cm, 12 cm, 15 cm, 21 cm, and 24 cm mortars for their customers.

The 15 cm M1881 was a heavy mortar that was designed to provide high-angle indirect fire for siege operations. It could be used to either attack or defend fortified areas. In defense, the mortar was used to provide high-angle fire to destroy enemy communications, supply, and attack trenches dug by an attacker during siege operations or it could be used by an attacker to destroy gun turrets, casemates, pillboxes, supply dumps, and command posts.

The 15 cm M1881 was a breech-loaded rifled mortar with an early form of horizontal sliding block breech that used separate loading propellant charges and projectiles. There were two types of mount one was a static fortress mount that had a round metal base that bolted to a concrete slab or a mobile siege mount that bolted to a rectangular wooden platform.

The upper part of both mounts was a wedge-shaped cradle constructed of riveted metal plates that held a trunnioned barrel. The U-shaped cradle allowed for high angles of elevation and was adjusted by a hand wheel on the side of the cradle that connected to a crescent-shaped elevation mechanism. Traverse was adjusted by a wooden pole that fit into a hole in the rear of the base and was levered into position. For transport, a pair of wheels were attached to an axle on the carriage and the rear was attached to a caisson with a seat for the crew. Or a set of poles could be attached to the base and towed by the crew.

== Users ==
The 15 cm M1881 was used during the Balkan Wars and World War I by the Ottoman Empire. A number armed Ottoman forts in the Balkans and a few were captured during the Balkan Wars. It is unknown if Serbia, Bulgaria, Greece, or Montenegro continued to use the mortars they captured? It may have also seen action during the Italo-Turkish War of the same period. The 15 cm M1881 was also used by the Swiss and the Italians used them during World War I.

== Gallery ==
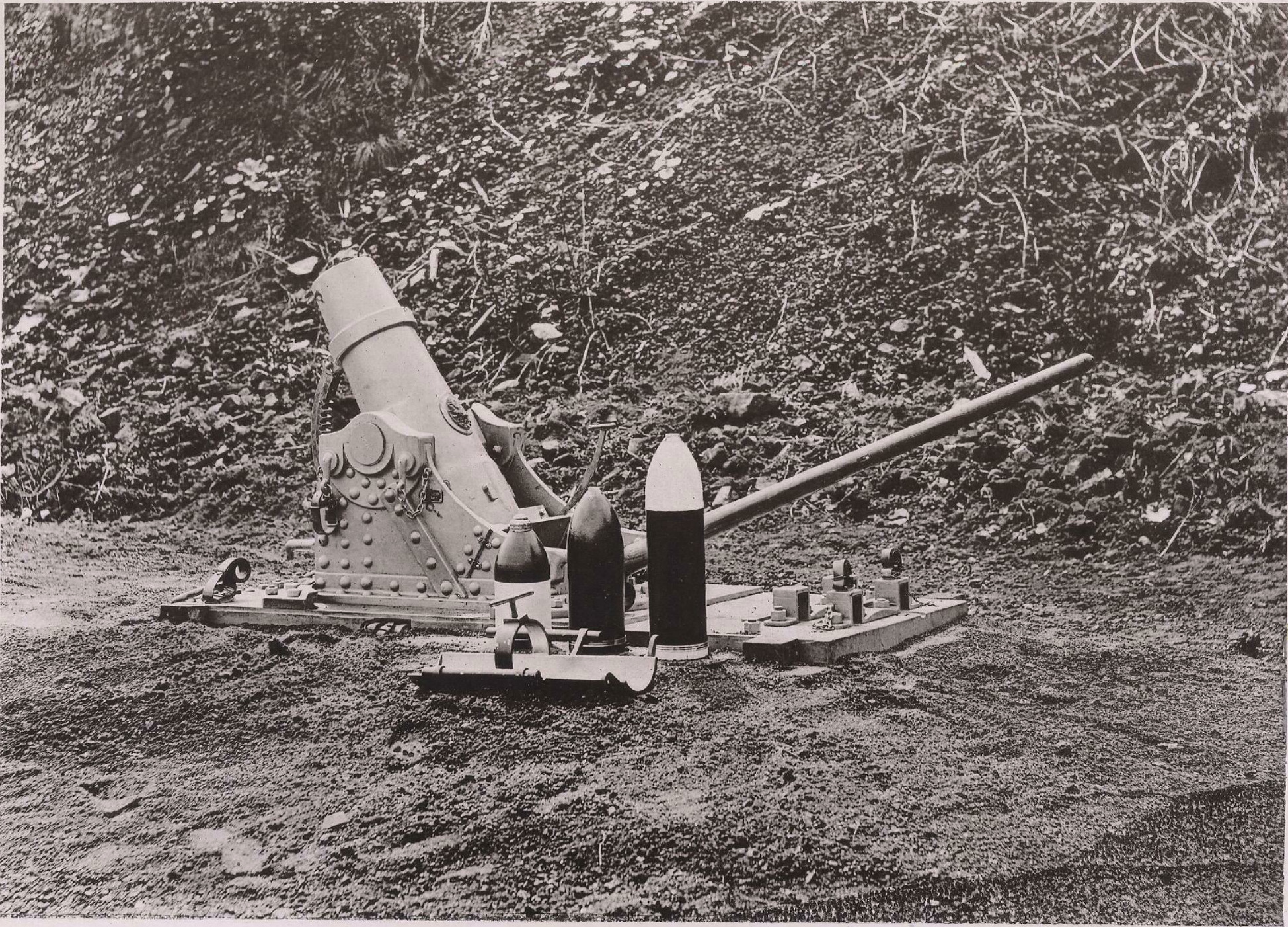
A 15 cm mortar with ammunition.

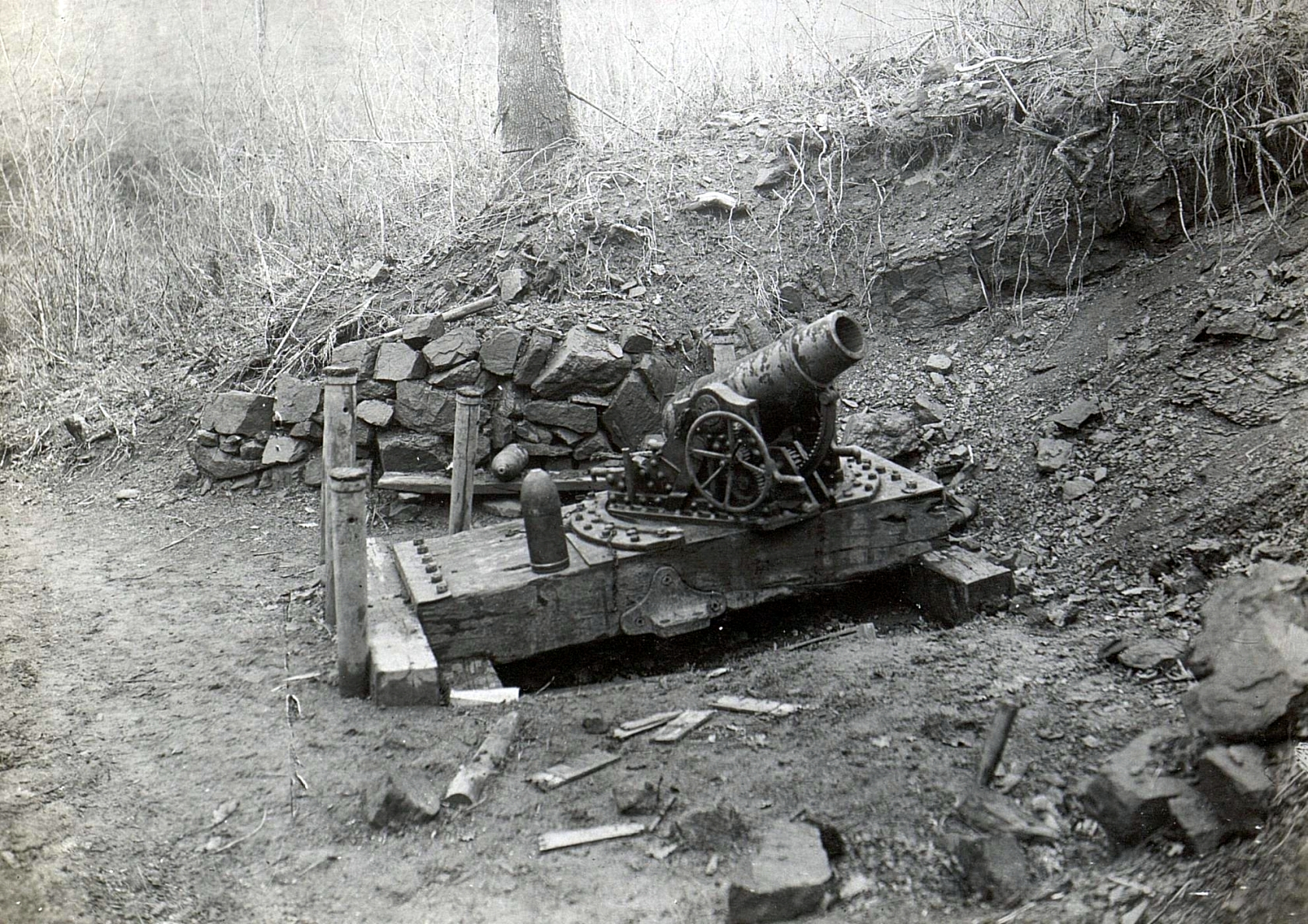
An Italian 15 cm mortar captured by Austro-Hungarian forces during World War I.

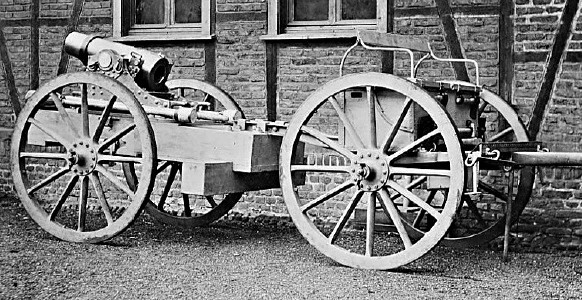
A 15 cm mortar attached to a caisson for transport.

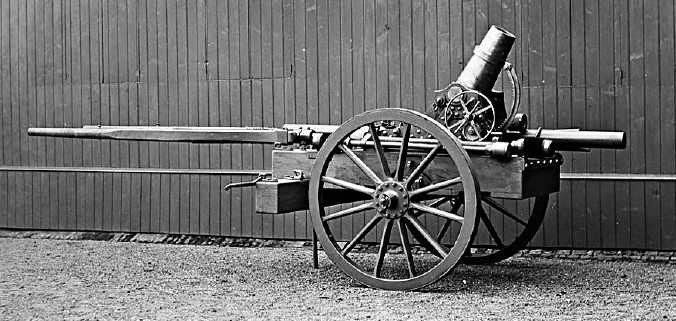
A 15 cm mortar with towing poles attached.

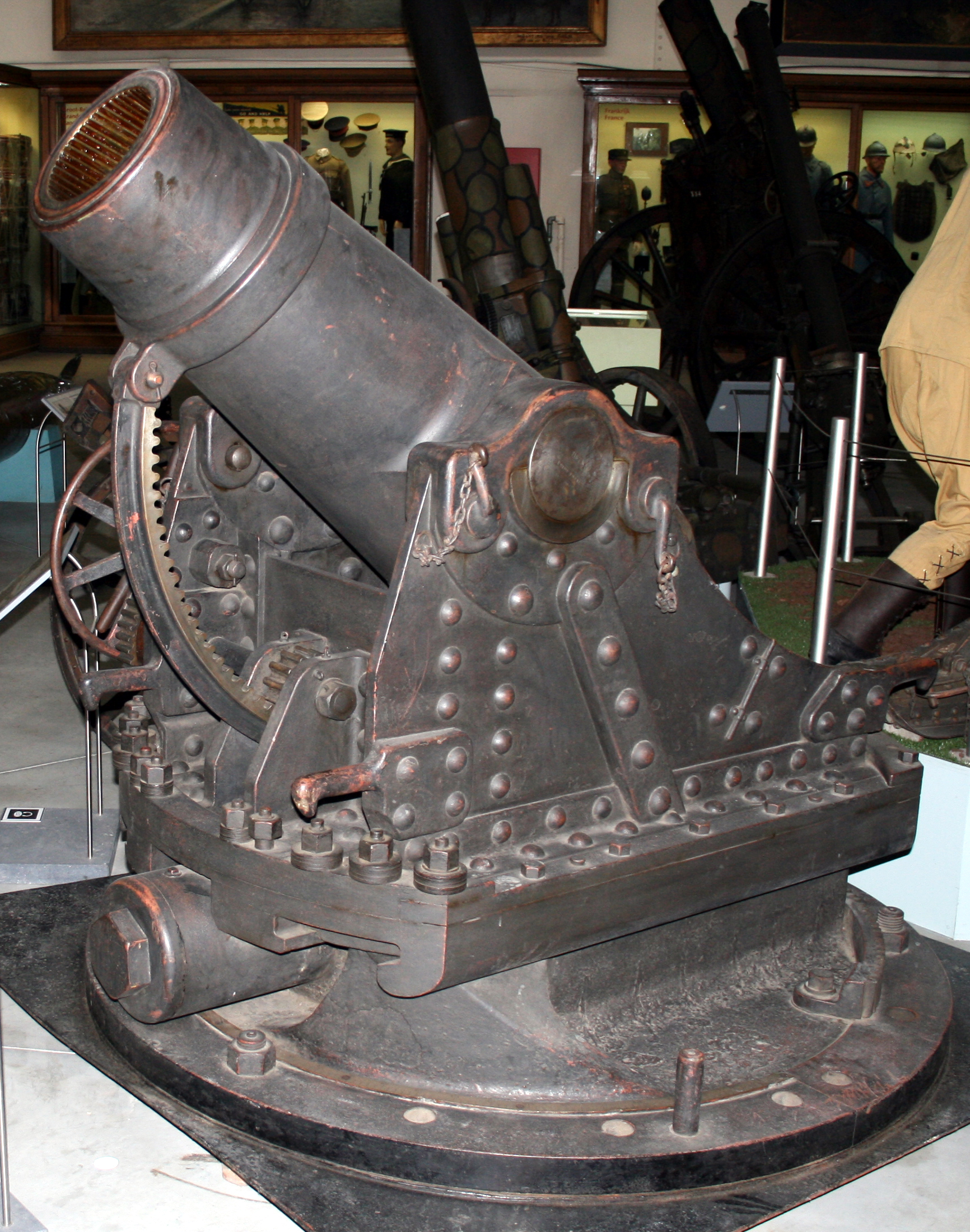
A similar 21 cm mortar at the Royal Military Museum, Brussels.
