= Coonrod =

Coonrod may refer to:

- Coonrod, a German- or Dutch-derived family name
  - Aquilla Coonrod, an American soldier during the American Civil War and the Indian Wars
  - Elinor Coonrod, American lawyer, suffragist, and clubwoman
  - John Coonrod, the executive vice president of the Hunger Project
  - Karin Coonrod an American theater director and writer at Yale School of Drama
  - Sam Coonrod, an American professional baseball pitcher for the New York Mets
- An alternative spelling or pronunciation of the name Conrad
- Coonrod, Georgia, another name for Shiloh, an unincorporated settlement in Madison County
- Coon rod, the baculum of a raccoon used as a toothpick
