= Conradt =

Conradt is a surname. Notable people with the surname include:

- Ervin Conradt (1916–2001), American politician in Wisconsin
- Jody Conradt (born 1941), American women's basketball coach
- Louis William "Bill" Conradt Jr. (1950–2006), American district attorney and suspected sexual offender
- Uwe Conradt (born 1977), German politician elected mayor of Saarbrücken in 2019
