= Conradus Viëtor =

Dutch Lutheran minister

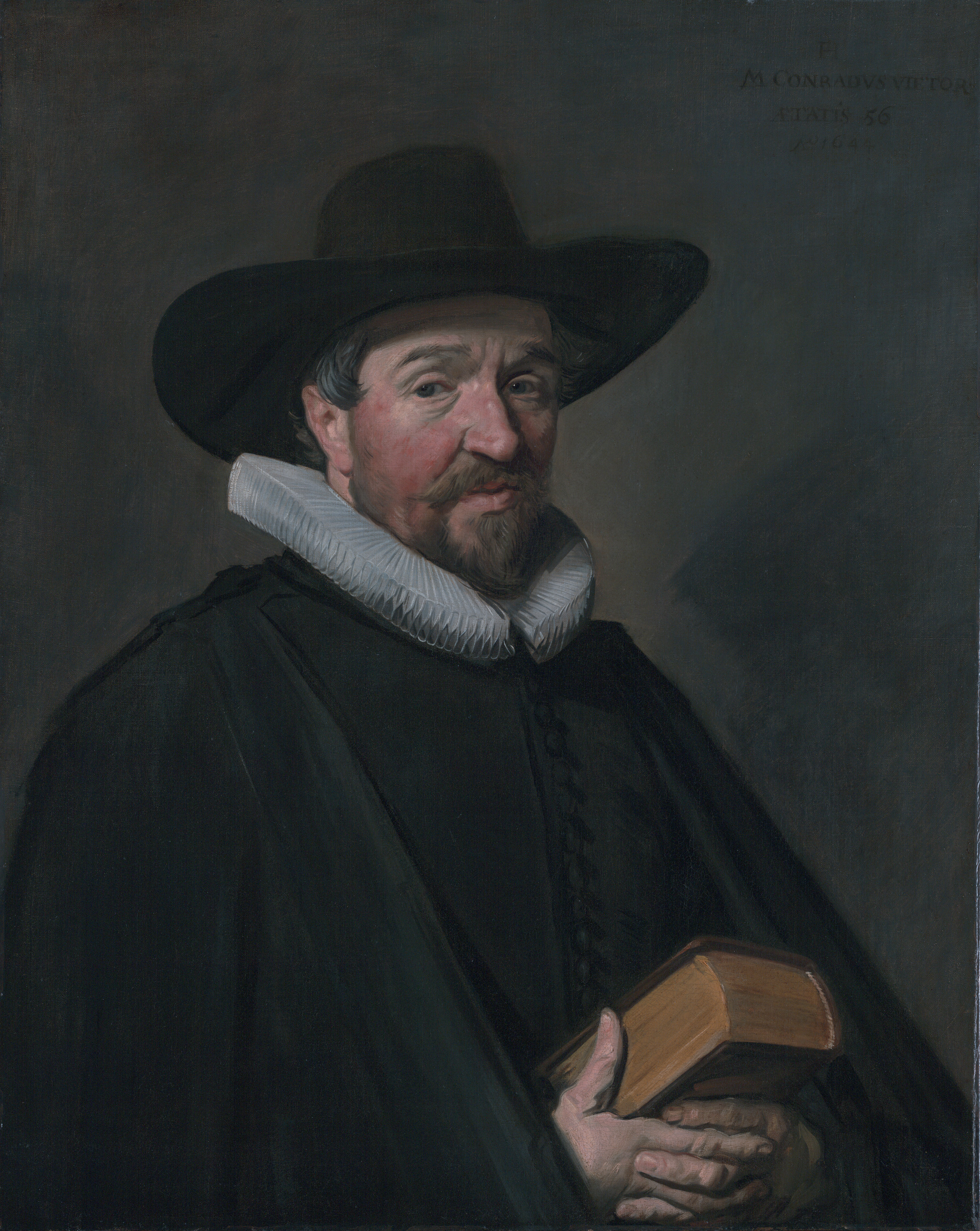
Portrait of Conradus Vietor, (Frans Hals, 1644)

Conradus Vietor (1588–1657) was a Dutch Lutheran minister who is most famous today for his portrait painted by Frans Hals.

== Biography ==
He was born in Aachen as the son of a Lutheran minister, but moved to the Netherlands, where he became a Lutheran minister in Leiden in 1614. He served there from 1614 to 1617 in the Leiden Lutheran church, where he started their baptismal register. He succeeded Henricus Justini, who had served only one year after the death of Bernhardus Aernoldi (or Muyners or Muykens). Arnoldi/Muykens/Muyners had been a Lutheran minister in Brussels and had fled to Aachen during the Protestant Reformation, where he may have influenced the young Vietor.

After setting up the infant baptism registration in Leiden, Vietor moved to Haarlem in 1617 where he served in their new Lutheran church. He began a long-drawn-out argument with the Mennonites there about the pros and cons of infant baptism, which started when a woman from his congregation married a Mennonite and left his church to join her husband's Doopsgezinde "Block". He went there to persuade her to come back and spoke "from ten in the morning until late in the evening", attracting quite a crowd of curious Mennonites in the process. Finally someone from Amsterdam was brought in to shut him up, promising him another chance to air his views, but this never happened and the rumor spread that he had "lost his argument". Piqued, he wrote a booklet in response, further explaining his "six reasons to baptise" and including the five other reasons that he had prepared for his second chance to air his views, which had never been granted.

Four years later, Pieter Jansz Mooyer, a Mennonite leader in Amsterdam (and probably the same person who stopped his passionate speech in Haarlem) wrote an answer to this booklet. Vietor again responded with a warning. Mooyer closed the argument with a final booklet, which finally seemed to settle the matter.

His portrait by Frans Hals that was painted in 1644 and shows him gripping his book in both hands, was sold in 2008 to the London art dealer Johnny Van Haeften for £1.2 million, which at the time was considered a "low estimate".
