= Konrad (given name) =

German male given name

- Gender: Masculine
- Name day: 12 November

Origin
- Language: German
- Meaning: 'bold counselor'

Konrad is a German masculine given name (with variants Kunz and Kunze) that means 'bold counselor'. Notable people with the name include:

- Konrad Adenauer (1876–1967), German politician, Chancellor of Germany 1949–1963
- Konrad Arras (1876–1930), Estonian politician
- Konrad Bayer (1932–1964), Austrian writer and poet
- Konrad Emil Bloch (1912–2000), German-born American biochemist
- Konrad Boehmer (1941–2014), Dutch composer
- Konrad Bukowiecki (born 1997), Polish athlete
- Konrad Carl (1930–2026), German trade union leader
- Konrad Czerniak (born 1989), Polish swimmer
- Konrad Dahl (1843–1931), Norwegian writer and priest
- Konrad Dannenberg (1912–2009), German rocket scientist
- Konrad de la Fuente (born 2001), American soccer player
- Konrad Dobler (born 1957), German long-distance runner
- Konrad Duden (1829–1911), German philologist
- Konrad Eleryk (born 1989), Polish actor
- Konrad Fünfstück (born 1980), German manager of Liechtenstein
- Konrad Gehringer (1939–2003), German inventor
- Konrad Gessner (1516–1565), Swiss naturalist
- Konrad Gilges (born 1941), German politician
- Konrad Grob (1828–1904), Swiss painter
- Konrad Heiden (1901–1966), German writer
- Konrad Henlein (1898–1945), Czechoslovak politician
- Konrad Hirsch (1900–1924), Norwegian-Swedish footballer
- Konrad Kaspersen (1948–2023), Norwegian jazz musician
- Konrad Kellen (1913–2007), American political scientist
- Konrad Koch (1846–1911), German teacher and football pioneer
- Konrad Knudsen (1890–1959), Norwegian painter, journalist, and parliamentarian
- Konrad Knutsen (1925–2012), Norwegian civil servant
- Konrad Kujau (1938–2000), German illustrator and forger
- Konrad Laimer (born 1997), Austrian Footballer
- Konrad Lorenz (1903–1989), Austrian scientist
- Konrad Mägi (1878–1925), Estonian painter
- Konrad Morgen (1909–1982), German SS lawyer
- Konrad Nielsen (1875–1953), Norwegian philologist
- Konrad Nordahl (1897–1975), Norwegian trade unionist and politician
- Konrad Osterwalder (1942–2025), Swiss mathematician and physicist
- Konrad "Conny" Plank (1940–1987), German record producer, musician, and sound engineer
- Konrad Püschel (1907–1997), German architect and Bauhaus student
- Konrad Rudnicki (1926–2013), Polish astronomer
- Konrad Salbu (1903–1986), Norwegian chess player
- Konrad Sundlo (1881–1965), Norwegian military officer and politician
- Konrad Szołajski (born 1956), Polish film director
- Konrad Tuchscherer (born 1970), American historian
- Konrad von Lichtenberg (1240–1299), German bishop
- Konrad von Marburg (1180–1233), German inquisitor
- Konrad von Würzburg (died 1287), German poet
- Konrad Wolf (1925–1982), German film director
- Konrad Zuse (1910–1995), German computer scientist

== See also ==
- Conrad (name), given name and surname
