= Konrad Rudnicki =

Polish astronomer

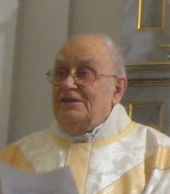
Konrad Rudnicki

Konrad Rudnicki (born 2 July 1926 in Warsaw, Poland, died 12 November 2013 in Kraków, Poland) was a Polish astronomer, professor at the Jagiellonian University in Kraków, and a priest of the Old Catholic Mariavite Church.

He was a member of the Free European Academy of Science, of Commission 28 (Galaxies) of the International Astronomical Union, and of the Mathematical-Astronomical Section at the Goetheanum in Switzerland.

== Life ==
In World War II, Rudnicki fought as a partisan in the Gwardia Ludowa. While they were living in Piotrków Trybunalski, he and his mother Maria gave shelter to a Jewish family, the Weintraubs, who thus escaped the Holocaust. In January 1996 Konrad and his mother were recognized at Yad Vashem as Righteous among the Nations.

Rudnicki was at the California Institute of Technology from 1965 to 1967 and at Rice University from 1988 to 1989.

He discovered several supernovae. One of them, SN 1962E, found between two galaxies, was the first such discovery to be made in the history of astronomy. He also advanced a new hypothesis on the structure of galaxy clusters.

His areas of interest included extragalactic astronomy, cosmology, and the philosophy and methodology of science.

He discovered comet C/1966 T1, known as "Rudnicki's Comet."

== See also ==
- List of Poles
- Science in Poland
- Polish Righteous among the Nations
