= Saint Conrad =

Saint Conrad may refer to:

- Saint Conrad of Constance (c. 900–975), bishop and saint
- Saint Conrad of Pfullingen (1035/1040–1066), of Trier
- Saint Conrad of Piacenza (1290–1351)
- Saint Conrad of Parzham (1818–1894), Franciscan Saint
- Blessed Conrad of Bavaria (c. 1105–1126/1154)
- Blessed Conrad of Offida (1290–1351), Italian Friar Minor preacher and founder of the Celestines.
- Blessed Conrad of Ottobeuren (died 1227)
- Blessed Conrad (Conn) O'Rourke (born c. 1542–1579), Franciscan martyr
- For Blessed Conrad of Seldenbüren (died 1126), see Engelberg Abbey
- For Blessed Conrad II Bosinlother of Mondsee (died 1145), see Mondsee Abbey
