= Corrado (given name) =

- Pronunciation: Italian: [korˈraːdo]
- Gender: Male

Origin
- Region of origin: Italy

Other names
- Related names: Conrad, Konrad, Corey, Cory, Kory

Corrado or Corradino (female: Corrada or Corradina) usually appears as the Italian version of the name Conrad or Konrad.

Notable people with the name include:

- Conrad of Piacenza (1290–1351), Italian penitent and hermit
- Corrado Alvaro (1895–1956), Italian journalist and writer
- Corrado Annicelli (1905–1984), Italian actor
- Corrado Aprili (born 1964), Italian tennis player
- Corrado Ardizzoni (1916–1980), Italian cyclist
- Corrado Augias (1935–2026), Italian writer and television host
- Corrado Bafile (1903–2005), Roman Catholic cardinal
- Corrado Balducci (1923–2008), Roman Catholic theologian of the Vatican Curia
- Corrado Barazzutti (born 1953), Italian tennis player
- Corrado Benedetti (1957–2014), Italian footballer
- Corrado Böhm (1923–2017), Italian computer scientist
- Corrado Borroni (born 1973), Italian tennis player
- Corrado Cagli (1910–1976), Italian painter
- Corrado Capece (died 1482), Archbishop of Benevento
- Corrado Carnevale (1930–2026), Italian judge
- Corrado Casalini (1914–?), Italian footballer
- Corrado Clini (born 1947), Italian politician
- Corrado Colombo (born 1979), Italian footballer
- Corrado Contin (1922–2001), Italian footballer
- Corrado Correggi, Italian businessman
- Corrado Maria Daclon (born 1963), Italian university professor, journalist and writer
- Corrado dal Fabbro (1945–2018), Italian bobsledder
- Corrado da Matelica (died 1446), Bishop of Bagnoregio
- Corrado d'Antiochia, Italian name for Conrad of Antioch (1240/41–1312), Sicilian nobleman
- Corrado del Monferrato, Italian name for Conrad of Montferrat (died 1192), Piedmontese nobleman
- Corrado de Concini (born 1949), Italian mathematician
- Corrado della Torre (1251–1307), Lombard condottiero
- Corrado Demetri della Suburra, name before election of Pope Anastasius IV (1073–1154)
- Corrado D'Errico (1902–1941), Italian screenwriter and film director
- Corrado Fabi (born 1961), Italian racing driver
- Corrado Fantini (born 1967), Italian shot putter
- Corrado Farina (1939–2016), Italian film director, screenwriter and novelist
- Corrado Fortuna (born 1978), Italian film actor and director
- Corrado Fumagalli (born 1967), Italian television presenter
- Corrado Gabriele (born 1966), Italian politician
- Corrado Gaipa (1925–1989), Italian actor
- Corrado Giannantoni (born 1950), Italian nuclear scientist
- Corrado Giaquinto (1703–1766), Italian Rococo painter
- Corrado Gini (1884–1965), Italian statistician
- Corrado Grabbi (born 1975), Italian footballer
- Corrado Gursch (born 1988), German politician
- Corrado Guzzanti (born 1965), Italian actor, director, writer and satirist
- Corrado Hérin (1966–2019), Italian luger and cyclist
- Corrado Invernizzi, Italian actor,
- Corrado Lorefice (born 1962), Archbishop of Palermo
- Corrado Lojacono (1924–2012), Italian singer-songwriter, record producer and actor
- Conrad Malaspina (The Old) and Conrad Malaspina (The Young), lords of Luinigiana
- Corrado Manili (died 1522), Bishop of Bagnoregio
- Corrado Mantoni (1924–1999), Italian radio and television host
- Corrado Mastantuono (born 1965), Italian comic book artist
- Corrado Mazzoni (1892–1917), Italian World War I lieutenant
- Corrado Melfi (1850–1940), Italian archaeologist
- Corrado Merli (born 1959), Italian footballer
- Corrado Micalef (born 1961), Canadian ice hockey player
- Corrado Michelozzi (1883–1965), Italian painter
- Corrado Miraglia (1821–1881), Italian opera singer
- Corrado Nastasio (born 1946), Italian footballer
- Corrado Olmi (1926–2020), Italian actor and comedian
- Corrado Orrico (born 1940), Italian football coach
- Corrado Paina (born 1954), Italian-Canadian poet
- Corrado Pani (1936–2005), Italian actor
- Corrado Parducci (1900–1981), Italian-American sculptor
- Corrado Passera (born 1954), Italian manager and banker and former Minister of Economic Development
- Corrado Pavolini (1898–1980), Italian futurist writer
- Corrado Pellanera (1938–2024), Italian basketball player
- Corrado Pilat (born 1974), Italian rugby union player and coach
- Corrado Pizziolo (born 1949), Bishop of Vittorio Veneto
- Corrado Racca (1889–1950), Italian actor
- Corrado Rizza (born 1961), Italian DJ and producer
- Corrado Roi (born 1958), Italian comic book artist
- Corrado Sanguineti (born 1964), Bishop of Pavia
- Corrado Segre (1863–1924), Italian mathematician
- Corrado Tartarini (died 1602), Bishop of Forlì
- Corrado Tommasi-Crudeli (1834–1900), Italian physician
- Corrado II Trinci (died 1386) and Corrado III Trinci (died 1441), lords of Foligno
- Corrado Ursi (1908–2003), Archbishop of Naples
- Corrado Varesco (born 1938), Italian biathlete
- Corrado Veneziano (born 1958), Italian visual artist
- Corrado Verdelli (born 1963), Italian football player and coach
- Corrado Zambelli (1897–1974), Italian classical bass
- Corrado Zoli (1877–1951), Italian writer, diplomat and explorer

== Fictional characters ==
- Corrado "Junior" Soprano, a character from the HBO crime drama The Sopranos

== As Corradino ==
- Corradino D'Ascanio (1891–1981), Italian aeronautical engineer
- Corradino Mineo (born 1950), Italian journalist

== See also ==
- Conrad (disambiguation)
- Konrad (disambiguation)
- Corradi
- Corradini
