= Brambilla =

Origin
- Languages: Italian, Lombard
- Meaning: "one from Val Brembilla"
- Region of origin: Lombardy

Other names
- Variant form: Brembilla

Brambilla is a topographic Italian surname derived from Val Brembilla in Italy.

== Origin and history ==
The surname Brambilla is a toponymic indicating one is from Val Brembilla, a comune located in the province of Bergamo. This city's name is derived from its location near the Brembo River.

During the 1400s, inhabitants of Val Brembilla commenced an exodus due to the city's massacres by the Guelphs and Ghibellines and the arrival of soldiers from the Republic of Venice. People from this village chose to flee westward to the Duchy of Milan, where they were exempt from paying taxes for over a century.

== Geographic distribution ==
Historically, Brambilla was the most prominent surname in Milan, leading to Italians from other regions jokingly referring to Milanese people by the term Sciur Brambilla (Mr. Brambilla in Milanese). By 2012, Brambilla had decreased to 9th most prevalent surname within the city, primarily due to immigration from East Asia and the rise of other surnames.

As of 2025, Brambilla is the most common surname in Vimercate, despite households with the surname decreasing from 732 to 452 from 1980 to 2025.

== People ==
- Cornélie Lebon-de Brambilla (1767-1812), Belgian born French engineer
- Edy Brambila (born 1986), Mexican footballer
- Elena Brambilla (1942–2018), Italian historian
- Ernesto Brambilla, Italian motorcycle and racecar driver
- Fernando Brambila (1763–1834), Italian-Spanish painter and engraver
- Francesco Brambilla, Italian sculptor of the Renaissance period
- Franco Brambilla (nuncio) (1923–2003), Vatican diplomat
- Gianluca Brambilla, Italian racing cyclist
- Giovanni Alessandro Brambilla, Italian physician
- Giovanni Battista Brambilla, Italian painter
- Giuseppina Brambilla, Italian opera singer, sister of Marietta and Teresa
- Gustavo Brambila (born 1953), Mexican-American winemaker
- Irene Brambilla, Argentine economist
- Leticia Brambila Paz, Mexican mathematician
- Marco Brambilla, Italian-born Canadian artist and filmmaker.
- Maria Brambilla, Italian ballerina, stage name Sofia Fuoco
- Marietta Brambilla, Italian opera singer, sister of Giuseppina and Teresa
- Massimo Brambilla, Italian football player
- Michela Vittoria Brambilla, Italian politician and businesswoman
- Nora Brambilla, Italian and German physicist
- Pierre Brambilla, French road bicycle racer
- Sofía Brambilla (born 1980), Argentine politician
- Teresa Brambilla, Italian opera singer, sister of Giuseppina and Marietta
- Teresina Brambilla, Italian opera singer, niece of Giuseppina, Marietta, and Teresa
- Vittorio Brambilla, Italian Formula One driver

== See also ==
- 640 Brambilla, a minor planet orbiting the Sun
- Brembilla (disambiguation)
