= Casalini (surname) =

Casalini is an Italian surname. Notable people with the surname include:

- Corrado Casalini, former Italian professional football player
- Emilio Casalini (born 1941), Italian racing cyclist
- Franco Casalini (1952–2022), Italian basketball coach
- Giancarlo Casalini (1934–2009), Italian rower
- Lucia Casalini Torelli (1677–1762), Italian painter, active in Bologna
- Oreste Casalini (1962–2020), Italian painter and sculptor
