= Borgocarbonara =

- Comune
- Comune di Borgocarbonara
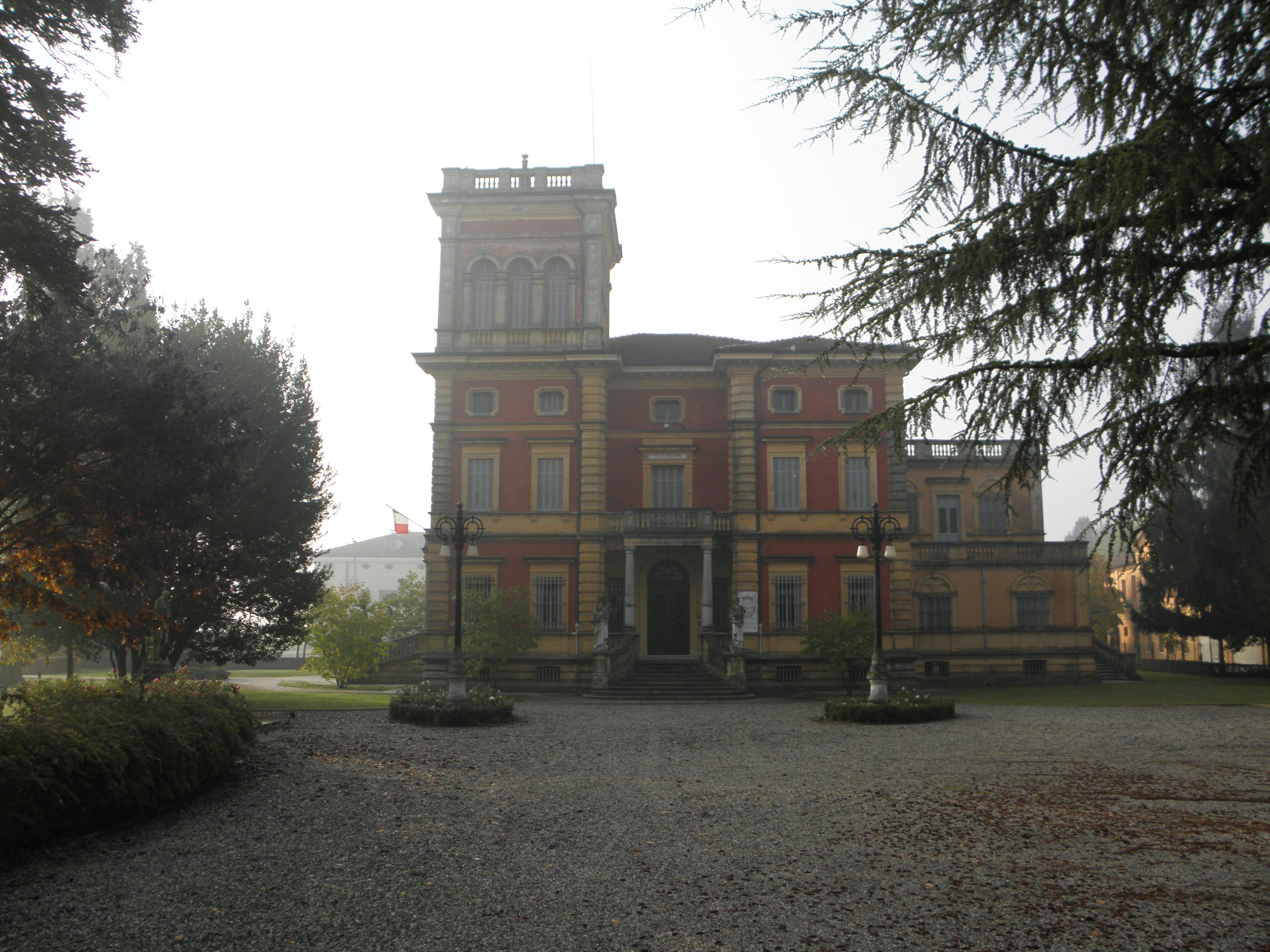
- The town hall, in Carbonara di Po

- Location within Italy Location within Lombardy
- Coordinates: 45°2′17″N 11°13′24.5″E
- Country: Italy
- Region: Lombardy
- Province: Mantua (MN)
- Frazioni: Bonizzo, Borgofranco sul Po, Masi, Carbonara di Po (sede comunale), Carbonarola, Cavo, Vallaźza

Area
  - Total: 30.50 km^{2} (11.78 sq mi)

Population (31 October 2019)
  - Total: 1,931
  - Density: 63.31/km^{2} (164.0/sq mi)
- Demonym: Borgocarbonaresi
- Time zone: UTC+1 (CET)
  - Summer (DST): UTC+2 (CEST)
- Postal code: 46021
- Dialing code: 0386

Borgocarbonara is a comune (municipality) in the province of Mantua, Lombardy, northern Italy. It was formed on 1 January 2019 by the merger of the previous comuni of Borgofranco sul Po and Carbonara di Po.
