= Cassano =

Cassano may refer to:

- Cassano's Pizza King, a pizza restaurant chain

== Places ==
- Cassano all'Ionio, a town in Calabria, Italy
- Cassano d'Adda, a town in Lombardy, Italy
- Cassano delle Murge, a town in Apulia, Italy
- Cassano Irpino, a town in Campania, Italy
- Cassano Magnago, a town in Lombardy (province of Varese), Italy
- Cassano Spinola, a municipality in the province of Alessandria, Italy
- Cassano Valcuvia, a municipality in the province of Varese, Italy

== People ==
- Alberto Cassano (1935–2014), Argentine engineer and academic
- Antonio Cassano (born 1982), Italian football player
- Claudio Cassano (born 2003), Italian football player
- Eleonora Cassano (born 1965), Argentine ballet dancer
- Franco Cassano (1943–2021), Italian sociologist and politician
- Joseph Cassano (born 1955), controversial insurance executive who was an officer at AIG Financial Products
- Mario Cassano (born 1983), Italian football player
- Massimo Cassano (born 1965), Italian politician and entrepreneur
- Piero Cassano (born 1948), Italian musician
- Riccardo Cassano (1885-1953), Italian film director
- Salvatore Cassano (born 1945), American Fire Commissioner
- Steve Cassano (born 1942), American politician

== See also ==
- Cassani, a surname
- Battle of Cassano d'Adda (disambiguation)
