= Marietta Brambilla =

Italian contralto (1807–1875)

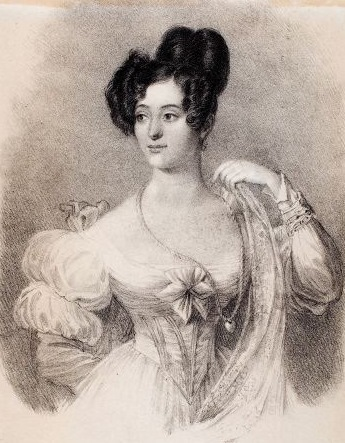
- Born: Maria Teresa Rebecca Brambilla; 6 June 1807; Cassano d'Adda, Kingdom of Italy, French Empire
- Died: 6 November 1875 (aged 68); Milan, Lombardy, Kingdom of Italy
- Education: Milan Conservatory
- Occupation: Opera singer (contralto)
- Relatives: Teresa Brambilla (sister); Giuseppina Brambilla (sister); Teresina Brambilla (niece); Corrado Miraglia (brother-in-law)

Maria Teresa Rebecca "Marietta" Brambilla (6 June 1807 – 6 November 1875) was an Italian contralto who sang leading roles in the opera houses of Europe from 1827 until her retirement from the stage in 1848. She is best known today for having created the roles of Maffio Orsini in Donizetti's Lucrezia Borgia and Pierotto in his Linda di Chamounix, but she also created several other roles in lesser-known works. She was the elder sister of the opera singers Teresa and Giuseppina Brambilla and the aunt of Teresina Brambilla who was also an opera singer.

== Life and career ==
Brambilla was born in Cassano d'Adda, the daughter of Gerolamo and Angela (née Columbo) Brambilla. She was the eldest of five sisters, all of whom became opera singers. Teresa (1813–1895) was a soprano who created the role of Gilda in Rigoletto. Giuseppina sang both contralto and soprano roles and was married to the tenor Corrado Miraglia. Both had very prominent careers. Annetta (1812–?) and Lauretta (1823–1881) were both sopranos who had lesser careers, appearing primarily in provincial Italian opera houses. (Note: Lauretta (or Laura) Brambilla had the shortest career of the five sisters. She attended the Milan Conservatory but was very unhappy there and eventually left before finishing her course. She appeared on stage in Milan and Venice in 1844–1845, but then retired to marry and raise a family. She died of cancer at the age of 56.)

Marietta Brambilla studied at the Milan Conservatory and made her stage debut in 1827 at Her Majesty's Theatre in London as Arsace in Rossini's Semiramide. She sang in several other operas in London that season as well as giving recitals in other English cities. She returned to Italy in 1828 where she sang at La Fenice in the world premiere of Pietro Generali's Francesca da Rimini. Brambilla made her debut at La Scala in the 1833 world premiere of Donizetti's Lucrezia Borgia as Maffio Orsini, a role he had written expressly for her. He also composed Pierotto in Linda di Chamounix for her and adapted the tenor role of Armando di Gondì in Maria di Rohan for her voice when the opera had its first Paris performance in 1843.

Brambilla retired from the stage in 1848, after which she taught singing in Milan and composed several albums of songs and vocal exercises. She married Count Francesco Furga-Gornini in 1857. The marriage ended with his death four years later. She died of cancer in Milan at the age of 68 and was buried in Cassano d'Adda.

== Roles created ==
Brambilla created the following roles, the majority of which were male characters performed en travesti. She was also the contralto soloist in the first performance of In morte di Maria Malibran de Bériot, a cantata in memory of Maria Malibran jointly composed by Gaetano Donizetti, Giovanni Pacini, Saverio Mercadante, Nicola Vaccai, and Pietro Antonio Coppola which took place at La Scala on 17 March 1837.

- Paolo in Pietro Generali's Francesca da Rimini, La Fenice, Venice, 27 December 1828
- Arturo in Carlo Coccia's Rosmunda d'Inghilterra, La Fenice, Venice, 28 February 1829
- Maffio Orsini in Gaetano Donizetti's Lucrezia Borgia, La Scala, Milan, 26 December 1833
- Enrico Pontigny in Luigi Ricci's Un'avventura di Scaramuccia, La Scala, Milan, 8 March 1834
- Bianca in Saverio Mercadante's Il giuramento, La Scala, Milan, 11 March 1837
- Guiscarda Obonello in Federico Ricci's Corrado d'Altamura, La Scala, Milan, 16 November 1841
- Pierotto in Gaetano Donizetti's Linda di Chamounix, Kärntnertor Theater, Vienna, 19 May 1842
- Irene in Vincenzo Battista's Irene, Teatro San Carlo, Naples, 26 December 1847
