= Teresina Brambilla =

Italian soprano opera singer (1845–1921)

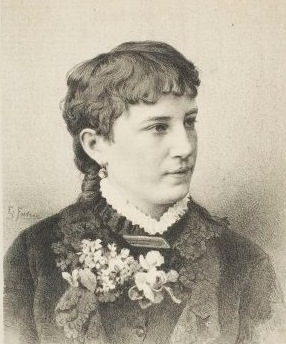
- Portrait of Brambilla by Ernesto Fontana
- Born: Teresa Brambilla; 15 April 1845; Cassano d'Adda, Lombardy–Venetia, Austrian Empire
- Died: 1 July 1921 (aged 76); Vercelli, Piedmont, Kingdom of Italy
- Occupation: Opera singer (soprano)
- Spouse: Amilcare Ponchielli (m. 1874; died 1886)
- Relatives: Marietta Brambilla (aunt); Teresa Brambilla (aunt); Giuseppina Brambilla (aunt)

Teresa "Teresina" Brambilla (Note: The first name of her aunt, Teresa Brambilla, was often listed as "Teresina" in 19th-century journals and cast lists. However, their careers did not overlap, as her aunt retired from the stage in 1855.) (15 April 1845 – 1 July 1921) was an Italian soprano who sang in the major opera houses of Europe in a career spanning 25 years. She was particularly noted for her interpretations of the leading roles in operas by Amilcare Ponchielli, whom she married in 1874.

== Life and career ==
Brambilla was born in Cassano d'Adda to a musical family. Her five aunts were all opera singers, three of whom (Marietta, Teresa, and Giuseppina Brambilla) had prominent careers. According to some accounts, she was trained in singing by Marietta and Teresa, and to others, by Giuseppina. She made her debut as Adalgisa in Norma in 1863 with the Italian opera company in Odessa where both Giuseppina and Teresa had sung to great success.

In Italy she performed primarily in the theatres of Milan, Ancona, Turin, and Rome. On 5 December 1872 she sang the role of Lucia Mondella in the premiere of Amilcare Ponchielli's major revision of his early opera I promessi sposi. (Note: The opera was premiered in its first version at the Teatro Concordia in Cremona in 1856. The libretto is based on Manzoni's famous novel The Betrothed (I promessi sposi).) The performance inaugurated Milan's Teatro Dal Verme and proved to be Ponchielli's first major success and a breakthrough for him as an opera composer. Ponchielli and Brambilla married in 1874, and she became known as the "ideal interpreter" of his works, receiving particular acclaim for her performance in the title role of La Gioconda which she first sang at La Scala on 18 April 1876.

Brambilla sang in the Rome premieres of Lohengrin (as Elsa) and Poliuto (as Paolina) and was also known for her interpretations of the Verdi heroines, Leonora and Aida. In the carnival season of 1875, she had sung the title role in Aida to great success at the Teatro Carlo Felice in Genoa, conducted by Verdi himself, in a run of 30 consecutive performances. After Ponchielli's death in 1886, she continued to perform until 1889 when she retired from the stage and became a voice teacher at the Geneva Conservatory. She later returned to Italy where she taught at the Pesaro Conservatory until 1911. Brambilla died in Vercelli at the age of 76. She and Ponchielli had three children, two sons and a daughter. Their son Annibale was a music critic and minor composer.

== Roles created ==
- Lucia Mondella in the revised version of Amilcare Ponchielli's I promessi sposi, Teatro Dal Verme, Milan, 5 December 1872
- Luce in Stefano Gobatti's Luce, Teatro Comunale, Bologna, 26 November 1875
- Lina in Amilcare Ponchielli's Lina, Teatro Dal Verme, Milan 17 November 1877
- Flora in Filippo Marchetti's Don Giovanni d'Austria, Teatro Regio, Turin, 11 March 1880

In addition to the above opera roles created by Brambilla, she was also the principal soloist in the first performance of Ponchielli's cantata Omaggio a Donizetti ("Homage to Donizetti"). (Note: The text of the cantata was written by Antonio Ghislanzoni) It was performed at the Teatro Riccardi in Bergamo on 13 September 1875, the day the ashes of Gaetano Donizetti and Simone Mayr were transferred to the city's Basilica of Santa Maria Maggiore.
