= Cassani =

Cassani is an Italian surname. Notable people with the surname include:

- Barbara Cassani (born 1960), American businesswoman
- Cesare Cassani (born 1944), Swiss wheelchair curler
- Daniele Cassani (active from 2008), Italian mathematician
- Davide Cassani (born 1961), Italian cyclist
- Enrico Cassani (born 1972), Italian cyclist
- Joseph Cassani (1673–1750), Spanish historian
- Lino Cassani (1869-1963), Italian priest, historian and archaeologist
- Mattia Cassani (born 1983), Italian footballer
- Valerio Cassani (1922–1995), Italian footballer

== See also ==
- Cassano (disambiguation)
- Cassini (disambiguation)
