= Francisco D'Andrade =

Portuguese opera singer (1856 - 1921)

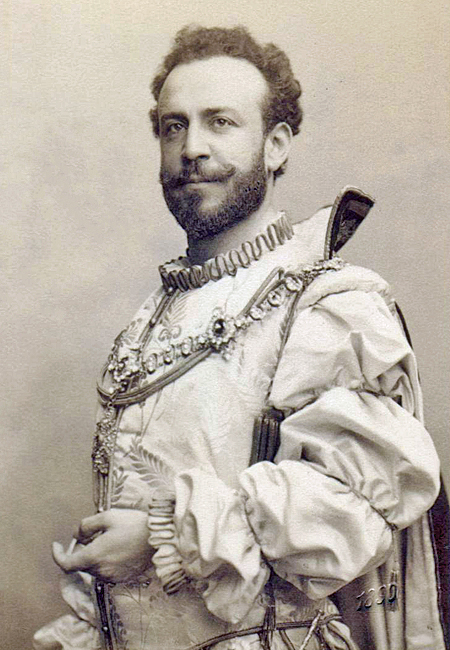
- D'Andrade in 1890 as Don Giovanni, his signature role
- Born: Francisco Augusto D'Andrade e Silva; 11 January 1856; Lisbon, Portugal
- Died: 8 February 1921 (aged 65); Berlin, Germany
- Known for: Opera singer (baritone)

Francisco Augusto D'Andrade, or De Andrade, (11 January 1856 – 8 February 1921) (Note: Although many sources still give the birth year as 1859, Mario Moreau in his Cantores de Ópera Portugueses (Bertrand 1981) established it as 1856 on the basis of documents in the possession of D'Andrade's son. See Bispo (February 2007).) was a Portuguese baritone who sang leading roles in opera houses throughout Europe, including five years as the principal baritone at the Royal Italian Opera in London and thirteen years at the Berlin Hofoper. Considered a "very elegant and cultured singer," he was particularly admired for his portrayal of the title role in Mozart's Don Giovanni. In his native city of Lisbon, D'Andrade created the role of Adaour in the 1888 world premiere of Alfredo Keil's Donna Bianca, appearing with his elder brother, the tenor António D'Andrade.

== Life and career ==
D'Andrade was born in Lisbon. His father was a prominent jurist there, and he initially trained as a lawyer. However, like his older brother António, D'Andrade also had a keen interest in opera and theatre. Both frequently attended performances in the Teatro do Ginásio and participated in amateur productions with the Sociedade Taborda. He studied the basics of acting and music with Manuel Carreira and Arturo Pontecchi, the principal conductor of the Teatro São Carlos, and gave his first public recital in 1879 at the Salão da Trindade in Lisbon. In the spring of 1881, he left for Milan to continue his musical training, first with the tenor Corrado Miraglia, and after Miraglia's death later that year with the baritone Sebastiano Ronconi.

D'Andrade made his operatic debut on 23 December 1882 at the Teatro Principe Amedeo in Sanremo as Amonasro in Verdi's Aida. Over the next four years he sang in the opera houses of Portugal, Spain and Italy, including the Teatro Costanzi in Rome, where he sang Count de Luna in Verdi's Il trovatore and Severo in the theatre's first performance of Donizetti's Poliuto. Both he and his brother were engaged as singers at the Théâtre Privé d'Opéra in Moscow for the 1885/86 season. They would appear together again in several other productions, most notably the 1888 world premiere of Alfredo Keil's Donna Bianca at the Teatro São Carlos with Francisco as Adaour and António as Aben-Afan.

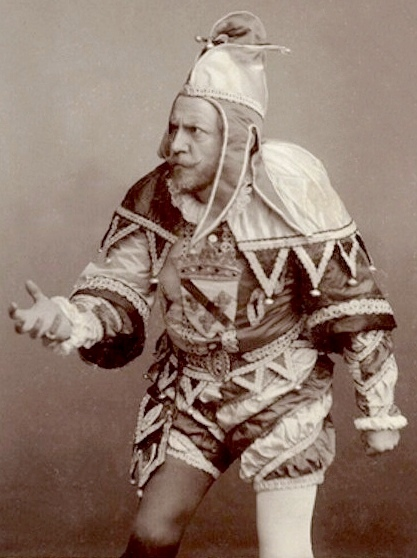
D'Andrade as Rigoletto, the role in which he made his Covent Garden debut in 1886

D'Andrade began a five-year association with the Royal Italian Opera in London in 1886. During that time he sang a wide range of leading baritone roles with the company including Renato (Ballo in maschera), Figaro (Il barbiere di Siviglia), Escamillo (Carmen), Giorgio Germont (La traviata), Enrico Ashton (Lucia di Lammermoor), Telramund (Lohengrin), and the title roles in Rigoletto and Don Giovanni. Throughout his career he was widely admired for his portrayal of Don Giovanni and also sang it at the Salzburg Festival in 1901. (Note: Prior to 1920, the festival was held by the International Mozarteum Foundation.)

Although he continued to tour Europe as a guest singer and recitalist, D'Andrade spent his later career primarily based in Germany, where in 1894, he received the Grand Gold Medal of Arts and Sciences from William II of Württemberg. He had a villa in Bad Harzburg which became an unofficial centre of Portuguese culture in Germany and sang regularly with the Frankfurt Opera from 1891 to 1910 as well as several other major German opera houses. He had first sung with the Berlin Hofoper in 1889 and became an official member of the company in 1906 remaining a member until his retirement.

D'Andrade moved back to Lisbon during World War I, but returned to Germany and the Hofoper after the war ended in 1918. He retired from the stage in 1919 and died in Berlin two years later at the age of 65. His body was taken back to Lisbon, where he was buried in the family tomb. He was survived by his wife, the Austrian pianist and singer Irma Noethig, whom he had married in 1900, and their son Francisco António Luís de Andrade. His widow later returned to Vienna, where she died in 1937.

== Portraits by Max Slevogt ==
A portrait of D'Andrade as Don Giovanni painted by Max Slevogt in 1912 hangs in the Alte Nationalgalerie in Berlin. Also known as Der rote D'Andrade ("The Red D'Andrade"), it depicts the graveyard scene in act 2 of the opera where Don Giovanni taunts the statue of the dead Commendatore and invites him to dinner. It was the last of three large scale oil portraits which Slevoght had painted of D'Andrade in different aspects of the role. The first of these, Der weiße D'Andrade ("The White D'Andrade") painted in 1902, depicts D'Andrade singing the "Champagne Aria" from act 1. It was an immediate success at the 1902 Berlin Secession Exhibition and marked Slevogt as a major exponent of German Impressionism. Der schwarze D'Andrade ("The Black D'Andrade") painted in 1903 depicts the final scene of the opera where the white marble hand of the Commendatore summons Don Giovanni to hell.

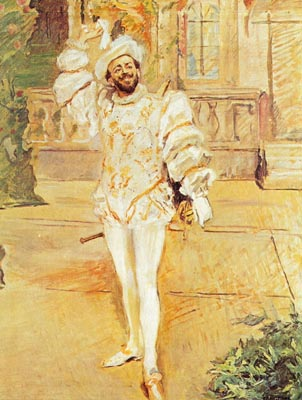
Der weiße D'Andrade ("The White D'Andrade") 1902

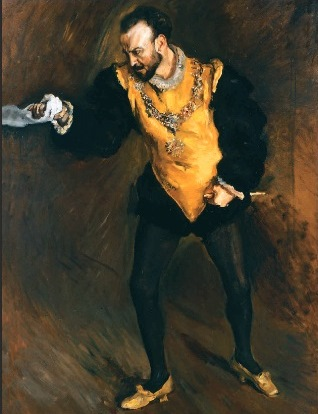
Der schwarze D'Andrade ("The Black D'Andrade") 1903

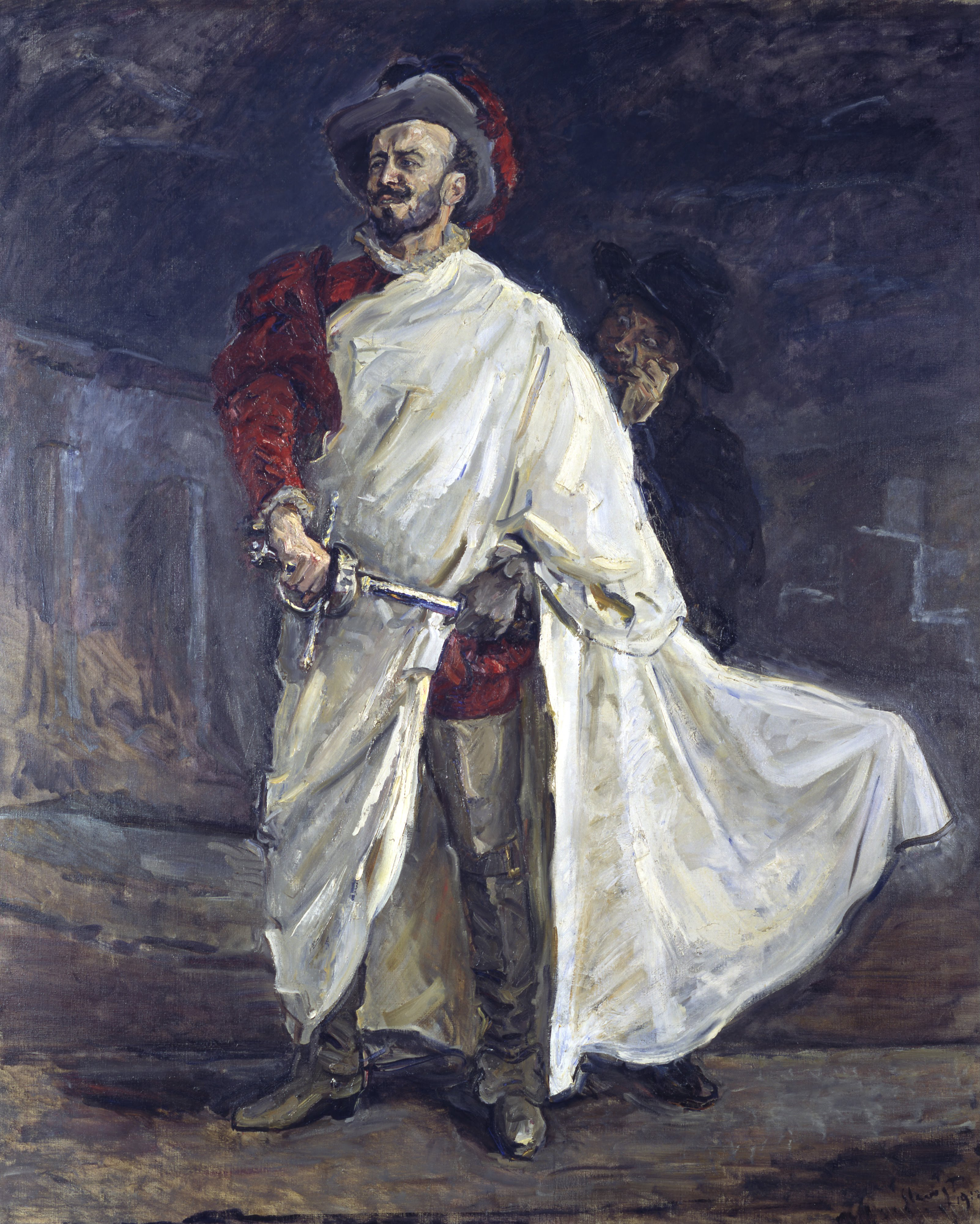
Der rote D'Andrade
("The Red D'Andrade") 1912

The young Max Slevogt first encountered D'Andrade in 1894 when he was captivated by his triumphant performance as Don Giovanni in Munich. It was the beginning of Slevogt's fascination with Mozart and particularly Don Giovanni. It was also the beginning of a friendship with D'Andrade that would last until the singer's death. When D'Andrade died suddenly in 1921, Slevogt rushed to his house to paint him one last time, but was so overcome by the sight of his dead friend that he was unable do so. Only later did he create a sketch of the coffin from memory entitled Grablegung Don Giovannis ("The burial of Don Giovanni").

== Recordings ==
D'Andrade made several recordings for the Lyrophon label in 1906, including the "Champagne Aria" from Don Giovanni which was later reissued on 78rpm by Parlophon and also included in Volume 1 of The Record of Singing. Five of the 1906 recordings were also released by the Symposium label in 2006 on the CD Major Vocal Rarities: "The Champagne Aria ("Finch' han dal vino") from Don Giovanni; "Largo al factotum" from Il barbiere di Siviglia; "Sois immobile" from Guillaume Tell; "O, du mein holder Abendstern" from Tannhäuser; and "Vien Leonora" from La favorita.
