= António D'Andrade =

Portuguese opera singer (1854–1942)

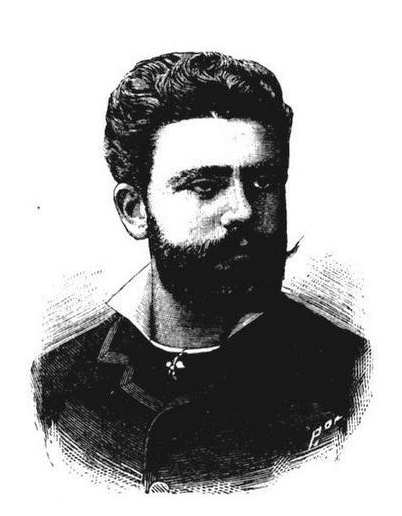
- Born: 13 April 1854; Lisbon, Portugal
- Died: 18 December 1942 (aged 88); Lisbon, Portugal
- Known for: Opera singer (tenor)

António D'Andrade, or De Andrade, (13 April 1854 – 18 December 1942) was a Portuguese opera singer who sang leading tenor roles throughout the opera houses of Europe, often appearing with his younger brother, the baritone Francisco D'Andrade. He created the roles of Roberto in Puccini's Le Villi (1884) and Aben-Afan in Alfredo Keil's Donna Bianca (1888).

== Life and career ==
D'Andrade was born in Lisbon where his father, José Justino de Andrade e Silva, was a prominent jurist. Like his brother Francisco, he initially trained as a lawyer, but also had a keen interest in opera and theatre. Both frequently attended performances the Teatro do Ginásio and participated in amateur productions with the Sociedade Taborda. They received their initial training in acting and singing from Manuel Carreira and Arturo Pontecchi, the principal conductor of the Teatro São Carlos. In 1881 the brothers went to Italy for further training with the tenor Corrado Miraglia and the baritone Sebastiano Ronconi.

D'Andrade made his operatic debut in Varese on 30 September 1882 as Fernando in La Favorita and went on to sing in several other Italian theatres over the next two years, including the Teatro Dal Verme (Milan), Teatro Regio (Turin), Teatro Rossini (Venice), and the Teatro Metastasio (Prato). At the Teatro dal Verme in 1884, he created the roles of Roberto in the first version of Puccini's Le Villi and Sandro in Alberto Favara Mistretta's Marcellina. Later that year, António and his brother were contracted by the opera house in Aix-les-Bains, with António singing to great success as Manrico in Il trovatore, Gennaro in Lucrezia Borgia, and the title roles in Faust and Marchetti's Ruy Blas. The impresarios of the Teatro Comunale in Trieste and the Teatro Regio in Turin had offered him lucrative contracts for the 1885 season, but a serious outbreak of cholera in Italy led both brothers to return to Lisbon instead.

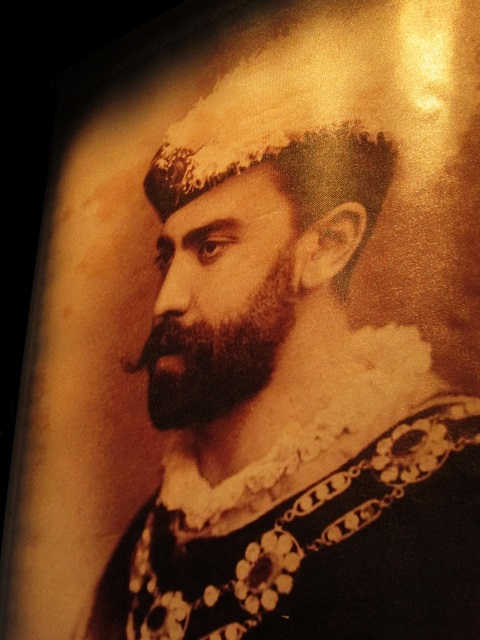
D'Andrade in 1888, an exhibit at the Teatro São Carlos in 2013

D'Andrade and his brother were then engaged as singers at the Théâtre Privé d'Opéra in Moscow for the 1885/86 season. During that time he also appeared in St. Petersburg and Warsaw. Later in 1886, he sang with the Royal Italian Opera in London as Radames in Aida, Don José in Carmen, and the title role in Lohengrin. D'Andrade continued singing as a guest artist in various European cities for the rest of his career as well as at the Teatro São Carlos in Lisbon. In 1888, he appeared there with his brother in the world premiere of Alfredo Keil's opera Donna Bianca—António as Aben-Afan and Francisco as Adaour.

By 1900 D'Andrade had retired from the stage, his career cut short by deafness. He died in Lisbon in 1942 at the age of 88. In November 2013 a month-long exhibition at the Teatro São Carlos, Noites em São Carlos ("Nights in the São Carlos"), dedicated an entire room to D'Andrade with photographs, objects, and documents that had been part of his private collection.
