= John Stephenson (cricketer, born 1907) =

English cricketer (1907–82)

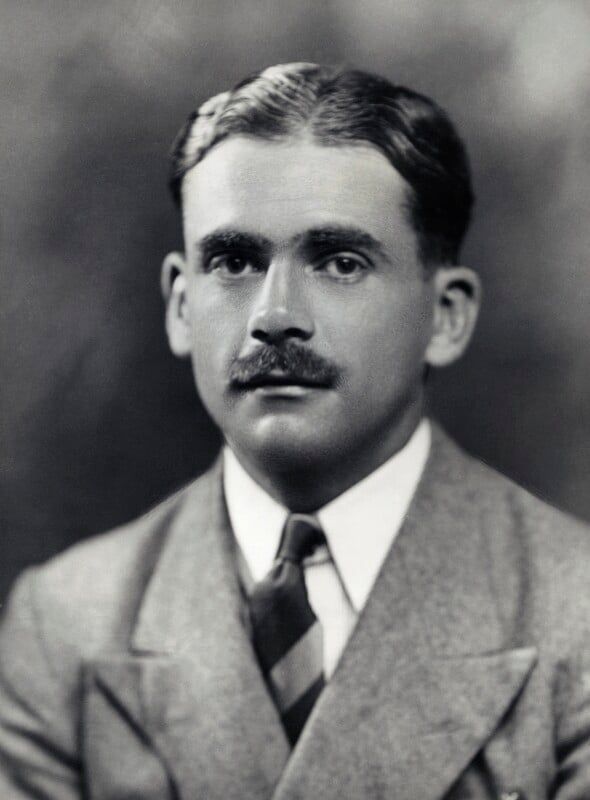
- Stephenson in 1936

Personal information
- Full name: John William Arthur Stephenson
- Born: 1 August 1907; Hong Kong
- Died: 20 May 1982 (aged 74); Mare Hill, Pulborough, Sussex, England
- Batting: Right-handed
- Bowling: Right-arm fast-medium

Domestic team information
- Years: Team
- 1928/29–1930/31: Europeans
- 1930/31: Madras
- 1934–1939: Essex
- 1947: Worcestershire

Career statistics
Competition	FC
Matches	103
Runs scored	2,582
Batting average	21.33
100s/50s	2/8
Top score	135
Balls bowled	15,323
Wickets	312
Bowling average	24.10
5 wickets in innings	16
10 wickets in match	2
Best bowling	9-46
Catches/stumpings	60/0
- Source: CricketArchive, 21 October 2008

Lieutenant Colonel John William Arthur Stephenson DSO (1 August 1907 – 20 May 1982) was a Hong-Kong-born English first-class cricketer who played in India and England from the late 1920s until shortly after the Second World War. His Wisden obituarist opined that "there would always have been fewer empty grounds" had more players been like him. He was also a British Army officer, who saw service in the Second World War.

== Life and career ==
=== Cricket career ===
John Stephenson was educated at Clayesmore School. On 2 February 1928, after having played some games for Buckinghamshire in the 1927 Minor Counties Championship while training at the Royal Military College, Sandhurst, he was commissioned as a second lieutenant into the Middlesex Regiment of the British Army. His service number was 39495. Posted to India, he made his first-class cricket debut for the Europeans against the Muslims at Bombay Gymkhana in the 1928/29 Bombay Quadrangular tournament, scoring 17 and 42 and taking 2 for 24 in the second innings. In his next match, against Parsees, he scored his maiden century, hitting 135 in the first innings. He played one more game for Europeans that season, then two more the following season, without much success. In 1930/31 he played for Madras against the Maharajkumar of Vizianagram's XI, then returned to the Europeans side and produced a good all-round display against Indians, making 117 (he never made another first-class century) and taking six wickets in an innings victory.

Stephenson was promoted to lieutenant on 2 February 1931, and returned to England later that year. He again turned out for Buckinghamshire, but in August made his English first-class debut for the Army against Marylebone Cricket Club (MCC) at Lord's. In a low-scoring match, his 20 not out in the second innings helped guide the Army to a four-wicket win. Over the next couple of seasons, he mixed further appearances for the Army (although not achieving any particular success) with continued appearances for Buckinghamshire.

He began 1934 with a game for Free Foresters against Cambridge University at Fenner's in early June, and took 4–99 in the first innings; at that stage his best innings return. A few days later, Stephenson commenced the Essex career which he would continue until the outbreak of war. His most successful season was 1936, in which he recorded his highest aggregates of both runs (521 at 18.60) and wickets (84 at 22.19). That summer also saw him record his best bowling figures, when he claimed 9-46 for the Gentlemen against the Players at Lord's, which remains the best innings return ever recorded for the Gentlemen. Following this performance, there was talk that Stephenson might be preferred to Bill Copson for the Ashes tour that winter, but it was not to be.

Stephenson was promoted to captain on 12 April 1937, and for the 1937 and 1938 cricket seasons his army duties precluded his playing a full season of cricket, but he continued to turn out for Essex when he could, and managed about 50 wickets in each season. In 1939 he played much more, and acted as captain on a number of occasions, one of three players so employed by Essex that year.

=== War service ===
Stephenson retired from the army on 1 July 1939, but the outbreak of war soon saw him recalled. During the Second World War he continued to serve with the Middlesex Regiment, rising to the war substantive rank of major, and as a temporary lieutenant colonel he commanded the 1/7th Battalion, Middlesex Regiment, a Territorial Army (TA) unit, in North Africa from mid-1942 onwards.

For his leadership of the battalion (which formed the machine gun battalion of the 51st (Highland) Division) at the Second Battle of Alamein in October/November and during the subsequent advance on Tripoli — and particularly for his actions at Corradini and during the attack on the Mareth Line — the division's General Officer Commanding (GOC), Major General Douglas Wimberley, recommended him for an immediate award of the Distinguished Service Order (DSO). The recommendation for the award describes how he personally ensured that the battalion supported the infantry, sometimes leading individual companies under heavy fire, and his carrying out of reconnaissance under fire. The commander of Eighth Army (the Desert Rats), General Sir Bernard Montgomery, endorsed the recommendation with the words, "I very strongly recommend this award". The award of the DSO was gazetted on 17 June 1943. Stephenson was also subsequently mentioned in despatches on 13 January 1944.

=== Later life ===
Stephenson did not continue in active service after the war, but was promoted to substantive major in the Reserve of Officers on 1 January 1949, and granted honorary rank as a lieutenant-colonel at the same time. He remained in the reserve until he reached the age limit for service on 6 November 1957.

The Second World War effectively ended his cricket career, although he did play three first-class matches afterwards. The first of these, for England against the Australian Services in May 1945, was in fact the first first-class game in England since 1939, and Stephenson took 5–116 in the first innings. He also played a single match for Worcestershire against Leicestershire in May 1947, and finally one game for South v Glamorgan at the end of 1948, though he did nothing remarkable in either match.

In 1946 Stephenson took a job of Chief Welfare officer [Richard_Thomas_and_Baldwins] Steelworks, where he started playing cricket for the works teams around the country. for the end of the 1946 season he played for Redbourn Steelworks Cricket club in the Grimsby and District League.

He died on 20 May 1982.
