= Corra =

Corra may refer to:

== Places ==
- Corra Linn Dam, a concrete hydroelectric dam on the Kootenay River in the Canadian province of British Columbia
- Corra Castle, a ruined 16th-century castle within the Corehouse Estate near New Lanark, Scotland
- Irish name for Currow, County Kerry, Ireland, a village

== People ==
Surname

- Bruno Corra, the pseudonym of Bruno Ginanni Corradini (1892–1976), Italian writer and screenwriter
- Henry John Corra (born 1955), American documentary filmmaker
- William Skinner of Corra (1823–1901), Scottish lawyer and author

Given name

- Cornelius Wilhelmus "Corra" Dirken (1938–2020), former South African rugby player
- Corra Mae Harris (1869–1935), American writer and journalist

== Science ==
- Corra (butterfly) a genus of skipper butterflies in the subtribe Moncina

== See also ==
- Corradi
