= Nicolò Corradini =

Nicolò Corradinimay refer to

- Nicolò Corradini (composer) (c. 1585–1646), Italian composer and organist
- Nicolò Corradini (skier) (born 1964), Italian ski-orienteering competitor
