= Borgofranco =

Borgofranco may refer to:

- Borgofranco d'Ivrea, a municipality in the Metropolitan City of Turin in the Piedmont region of Italy
- Borgofranco sul Po, a municipality in the Province of Mantua in the Lombardy region of Italy
