= 640 Brambilla =

Asteroid

Discovery
- Discovered by: August Kopff
- Discovery site: Heidelberg
- Discovery date: 29 August 1907

Designations
- Alternative designations: 1907 ZW

Orbital characteristics
- Epoch 31 July 2016 (JD 2457600.5)
- Uncertainty parameter 0
- Observation arc: 108.57 yr (39655 d)
- Aphelion: 3.4132 AU (510.61 Gm)
- Perihelion: 2.9022 AU (434.16 Gm)
- Semi-major axis: 3.1577 AU (472.39 Gm)
- Eccentricity: 0.080911
- Orbital period (sidereal): 5.61 yr (2049.5 d)
- Mean anomaly: 195.722°
- Mean motion: 0° 10^{m} 32.34^{s} / day
- Inclination: 13.376°
- Longitude of ascending node: 234.934°
- Argument of perihelion: 31.380°

Physical characteristics
- Mean radius: 40.395±1.15 km
- Synodic rotation period: 7.768 h (0.3237 d)
- Geometric albedo: 0.0686±0.004
- Absolute magnitude (H): 9.2

640 Brambilla is a minor planet orbiting the Sun.

Brambilla is an Italian surname derived from Val Brembana in Italy.
