= Brembilla (disambiguation) =

Brembilla may refer to:

- Brembilla, a former commune in the province of Bergamo, in Lombardy, Italy
  - Val Brembilla, a comune resulting from the 2014 merger of Brembilla and Gerosa
- Alberto Brembilla, an Italian basketball player
- Emiliano Brembilla, an Italian swimmer
- Pierre Brembilla, a French association football player in the 1930s and 1940s

== See also ==
- Brambilla
