= Donna Bianca =

Italian opera

Donna Bianca is an opera in a prologue and four acts composed by Alfredo Keil to an Italian-language libretto by César Féréal. The libretto is based the narrative poem Dona Branca by Almeida Garrett. The opera premiered on 10 March 1888 at the Teatro São Carlos in Lisbon and had 30 performances between 1888 and 1899. The opera was revived at the Teatro São Carlos in September 2010 in a series of four concert performances sung in the original Italian.

Set in Portugal during the reconquest of the Kingdom of the Algarve from the Moors in the second half of the 13th century, the opera recounts the tragic love story between Afonso III's daughter Dona Branca and the Moor ruler Aben-Afan.

== Roles ==
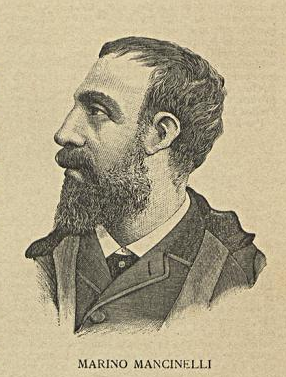
Marino Mancinelli

Role	Voice type	Premiere cast, 10 March 1888 (Conductor: Marino Mancinelli)
Aben-Afan	tenor	António D'Andrade
Donna Bianca	soprano	Elena Theodorini
Adaour	baritone	Francisco D'Andrade
Old Moorish woman	contralto	Giulia Prandi
Don Payo Peres	bass	Meroles
Don Nuno	tenor	Durini
Soldier	baritone	Pietro Ghidotti
Fada	mezzo-soprano	G. Figuet
Alda	soprano	Olavarri
Popular	tenor	Foresti
