= Corradini =

Corradini is an Italian surname that may refer to:

- Francesco Berardino Corradini (1635–1718), Italian Roman Catholic Bishop of Marsi (1680–1718)
- Pietro Marcellino Corradini (1658–1743), Italian Roman Catholic cardinal
- Antonio Corradini (1688–1752), Venetian Rococo sculptor
- Bartolommeo Corradini (15th century), Italian painter of the Quattrocento, active mainly in Urbino, also known as Fra Carnevale
- Agustín Esteban Corradini (born 1984), Argentine retired field hockey player
- Deedee Corradini (1944–2015), American businesswoman and politician
- Enrico Corradini (1865–1931), Italian novelist, essayist, journalist and politician
- Giancarlo Corradini (born 1961), Italian football manager and former player
- Gino Corradini (born 1941), Italian weightlifter
- Matteo Corradini (born 1975), Italian writer
- Melania Corradini (born 1987), Italian paralympic alpine skier
- Nicolò Corradini (composer) (c. 1585–1646), Italian composer and organist
- Nicolò Corradini (skier) (born 1964), Italian ski-orienteering competitor
