= Melara =

- Comune
- Comune di Melara
- Location within Italy Location within Veneto
- Coordinates: 45°4′N 11°12′E
- Country: Italy
- Region: Veneto
- Province: Province of Rovigo (RO)
- Frazioni: Santo Stefano

Area
  - Total: 17.6 km^{2} (6.8 sq mi)

Population (Dec. 2004)
  - Total: 1,927
  - Density: 109/km^{2} (284/sq mi)
- Demonym: Melaresi
- Time zone: UTC+1 (CET)
  - Summer (DST): UTC+2 (CEST)
- Postal code: 45037
- Dialing code: 0425
- Website: Official website

Melara is a comune (municipality) in the Province of Rovigo in the Italian region Veneto, located about 100 kilometres (62 mi) southwest of Venice and about 45 kilometres (28 mi) west of Rovigo. As of 31 December 2004, it had a population of 1,927 and an area of 17.6 square kilometres (6.8 mi^{2}).

The municipality of Melara contains the frazione (subdivision) Santo Stefano.

Melara borders the following municipalities: Bergantino, Borgofranco sul Po, Cerea, Ostiglia.

== Demography ==
Historical population

Year	Pop.	±%
1861	?	—
1871	2,997	—
1881	3,167	+5.7%
1901	3,318	+4.8%
1911	3,633	+9.5%

Year	Pop.	±%
1921	3,710	+2.1%
1931	3,595	−3.1%
1936	3,560	−1.0%
1951	3,305	−7.2%
1961	2,718	−17.8%

Year	Pop.	±%
1971	2,430	−10.6%
1981	2,272	−6.5%
1991	2,055	−9.6%
2001	1,927	−6.2%

Source: Data from ISTAT
