= Battle of Cassano d'Adda =

Battle of Cassano or Battle of Cassano d'Adda refers to several battles fought near the city of Cassano d'Adda in Lombardy, Italy:

- Battle of Cassano (1259), fought by Ezzelino III da Romano and Oberto Pallavicino of Cremona against the Guelph League
- Battle of Cassano (1705), during the War of the Spanish Succession
- Battle of Cassano (1799), during the French Revolutionary Wars, between the Austro-Russian forces of the Second Coalition and the French Republicans
