= Bergantino =

- Comune
- Comune di Bergantino
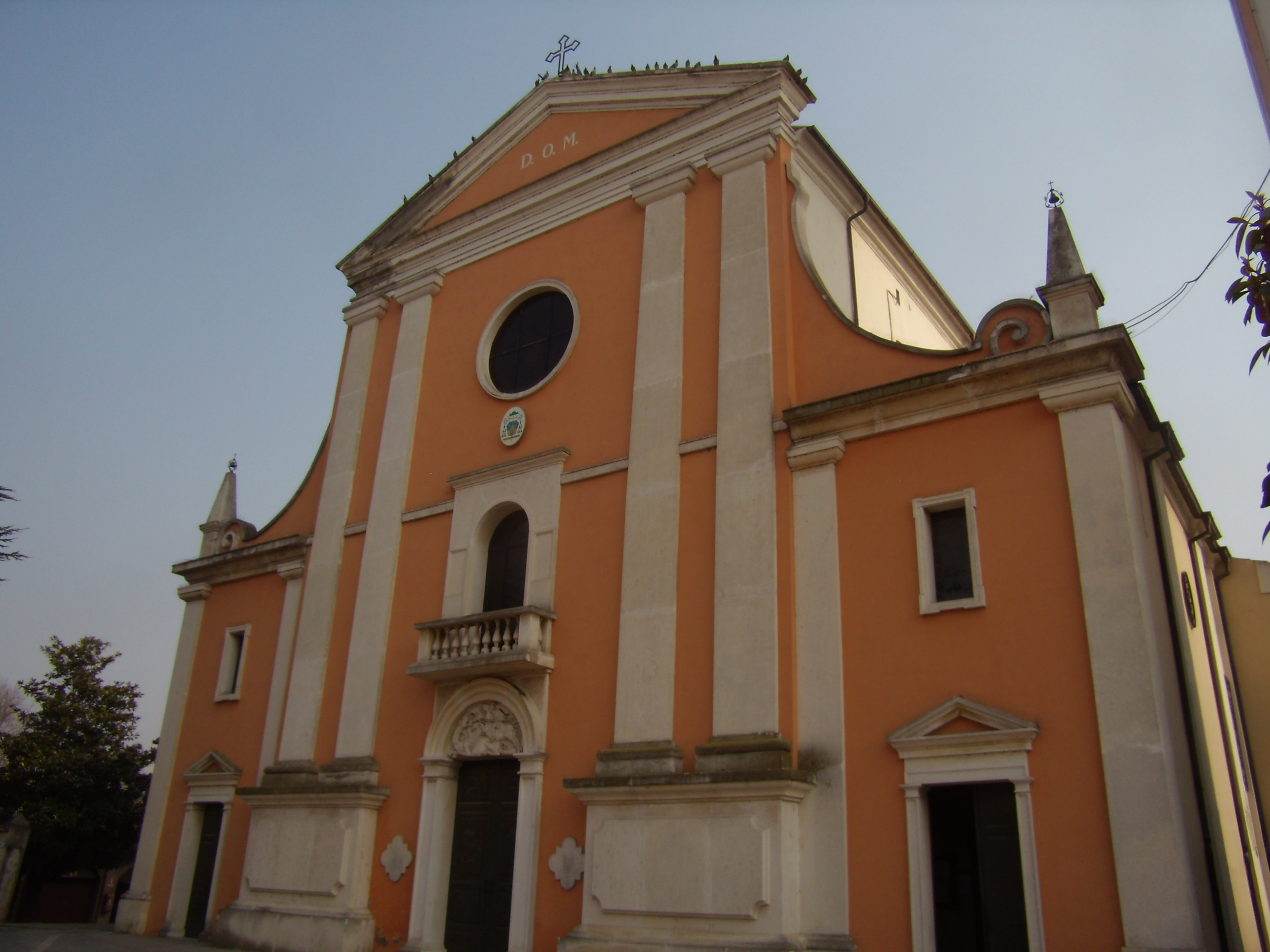
- San Giorgio (Saint George), the parish church of Bergantino

- Coat of arms

- Location within Italy Location within Veneto
- Coordinates: 45°4′N 11°15′E
- Country: Italy
- Region: Veneto
- Province: Rovigo (RO)
- Frazioni: Bugno, Ca' Poltronieri, Le Fornaci, Malpassaggio, Marchese, Prateria, San Giovanni

Government
  - Mayor: Giovanni Rizzati

Area
  - Total: 18.2 km^{2} (7.0 sq mi)
- Elevation: 15 m (49 ft)

Population (30 April 2017)
  - Total: 2,516
  - Density: 138/km^{2} (358/sq mi)
- Demonym: Bergantinesi
- Time zone: UTC+1 (CET)
  - Summer (DST): UTC+2 (CEST)
- Postal code: 45032
- Dialing code: 0425
- Website: Official website

Bergantino is a comune (municipality) in the Province of Rovigo in the Italian region Veneto, located about 90 kilometres (56 mi) southwest of Venice and about 40 kilometres (25 mi) west of Rovigo.

Bergantino borders the following municipalities: Borgofranco sul Po, Carbonara di Po, Castelnovo Bariano, Cerea, Legnago, Melara.

Composer Stefano Gobatti was born in Bergantino.
