= Battle of Cassano (1259) =

1259 battle

Coordinates: 45.52606°N 9.516771°E

- Part of Guelphs and Ghibellines
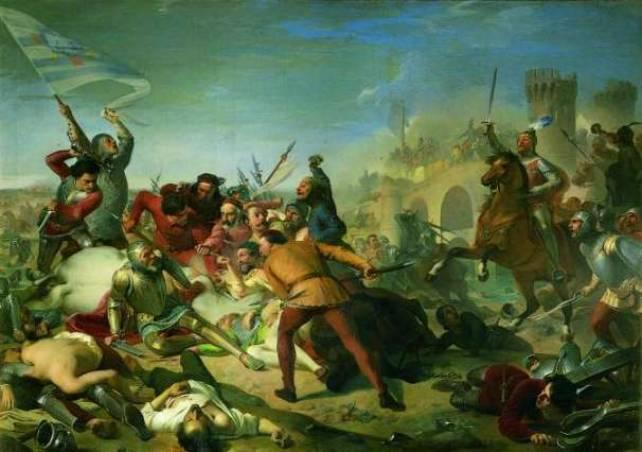
- The Defeat of Ezzelino da Romano
Date	September 16, 1259
Location	Cassano d'Adda, Lombardy
Result	Decisive Guelph victory

Belligerents
Guelphs: House of Este; House of Pallavicini; House of Della Torre	Ghibellines: Brescia, Verona, Vicenza, Pedemonte, German Knights

Commanders and leaders
Azzo VII d'Este	Ezzelino III da Romano (WIA) †

Strength
Troops from: Milan, Cremona, Mantua and Ferrara	8,000 Cavalry; Incl. 3,000 Knights

Casualties and losses
Unknown	Heavy

The Battle of Cassano was fought in the Autumn of 1259 between Guelph and Ghibelline armies in Northern Italy.

In 1259, Ezzelino da Romano and his Ghibelline army moved into Lombardy and besieged Orci Novi. However, the approach of the Guelph army forced Ezzelino to abandon the siege and cross the Oglio River. Joined by exiled nobles from Milan, the Ghibellines attempted to take the city of Monza by force but failed. Ezzelino and his troops, aware of their now-dangerous position, retreated to the Adda River.

Here, Ezzelino and his troops were defeated by the Guelphs under Azzo VII d'Este. Ezzelino was wounded and captured, and imprisoned at Soncino, where he died of his wounds a few days later.

In Soncino, a weekly bell ring recalls Ezzelino III da Romano's death. Legend has it that he was buried with his treasure.
