= Nora Brambilla =

Italian and German theoretical physicist

- Born: February 19, 1964
- Citizenship: Italy and Germany
- Education: University of Milan (B.Sc.); University of Milan (Ph.D.); University of Vienna (Habilitation)
- Known for: Effective field theory; Quantum chromodynamics; Lattice gauge theory; Renormalization
- Scientific career
- Fields: Theoretical Physics
- Workplaces: Technical University of Munich (2008–present); University of Milan (2002–2008); Philips Labs, Aachen (2001)

Nora Brambilla (February 19, 1964) is an Italian and German theoretical particle physicist known for her research on quarkonium, particles composed of two quarks instead of the more usual three. She is a professor of theoretical particle and nuclear physics at the Technical University of Munich.

== Education and career ==
Brambilla is originally from Milan, and holds both Italian and German citizenship. She studied particle physics at the University of Milan, completing her PhD there in 1993. In 1999, she earned a habilitation in theoretical physics at the University of Vienna.

After various research positions, she became a tenured faculty member at the University of Milan in 2002, before moving to Munich in 2008. She is currently the head of a research group at the Physik-Department of the Technical University of Munich.

== Recognition ==
In 2012, Brambilla was named a Fellow of the American Physical Society "for her contributions to the theory of heavy-quark-antiquark-systems, including the development of new effective field theories, and for contributions to the field of heavy-quarkonium physics through the founding and leadership of the Quarkonium Working Group".
