= Giovanni Battista Brambilla =

Italian painter

Giovanni Battista Brambilla (active 1770) was an Italian painter.

He was a native of Piedmont. He was a pupil of Carlo Delfino. He painted for churches in Turin, including a Martyrdom of St. Dalmazio for the church dedicated to that saint. He also painted altarpieces for churches in Villafranca. The Equestrian Portrait of Carlo Emanuele II, Duke of Savoy and of Vittorio Amedeo II, Prince of Piedmont (c. 1675) are on exhibit at the Palazzo Madama of Turin.
