= Corrado Veneziano =

Italian artist and theater director

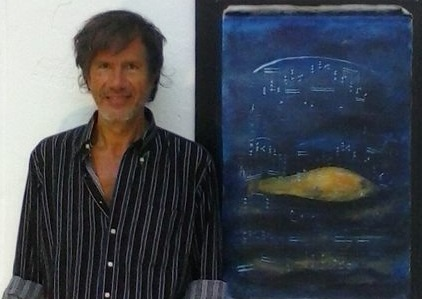
Corrado Veneziano.

Corrado Veneziano (born 1958, Tursi, Italy) is an Italian painter, visual artist, author, and academic. He has exhibited his works across Italy, Russia, and Western Europe and has published and lectured extensively on the Italian language and its dialects.

== Early life and education ==
Born in Tursi in 1958, Veneziano pursued a PhD in Art and Literature. In 1976, he studied directing at the Piccolo Theatre School in Milan while attending the University of Milan, Faculty of Modern Literature. He later graduated from the University of Bari with credentials to teach Latin, Italian, history, and philosophy. During this period, he authored multiple books on communication, collaborating with publishers such as Laterza, Giunti, Besa, Gremese, ETS, and Il Sextante. Between 2007 and 2011, he produced and directed a series of 10 films titled Accipicchia, ci hanno rubato la lingua!, focusing on expressiveness, art, and language. The series was produced by Italy's RAI television network.

== Artistic career ==
Since 2013, Veneziano's focus has increasingly shifted toward figurative art and painting. His debut solo exhibition, Le forme dei non-luoghi ("Forms of Non-Places"), was held in Rome's ECOS Gallery in 2013, with commentary from critics Achille Bonito Oliva and Marc Augé. In 2014, he exhibited in Brussels at the Institute of Italian Culture as part of the "Non-places" event, introduced by media scholar Derrick de Kerckhove.

In 2015, Veneziano presented Isbn Dante e altre visioni at Paris's Espace en Cours. He was also commissioned by RAI to produce a painting for the Prix Italy exhibition in Turin, titled The Power of History. Laboratory of Creativity, which honored the historian Herodotus.

His 2016 exhibition, L'Anima dei Codici ("Soul Codes"), took place at the Nevsky 8 Gallery in St. Petersburg, Russia, and featured works inspired by ISBN codes, curated by Francesco Attolini. The following year, he exhibited 40 works in Lanzhou, China, in an exhibition titled Signs, curated by Wu Weidung of the National Museum of Modern and Contemporary Art.

== Recent works and international recognition ==
In 2019, for the 500th anniversary of Leonardo da Vinci's death, Veneziano was invited by the Loire Region and the City of Amboise to present his exhibition Leonardo Atlantico, sponsored by the French Presidency and the Louvre Museum. His 2021 exhibition, ISBN Dante and Other Visions, was the only solo exhibition by a living artist supported by Italy's Ministry of Culture as part of the celebrations for the 700th anniversary of Dante Alighieri's death. The exhibition, which featured the painting Hell (evoking the artist Buffalmacco), included a work that was adapted into a commemorative stamp by the Italian government.

In 2022, Veneziano restored 13 historical advertising totems on Rome’s Tiber Island, a UNESCO World Heritage site. He decorated the totems with verses from Virgil's Georgics and visual elements promoting respect for nature and animals.

In 2023, Veneziano moved part of his practice to Brussels, Belgium, where he exhibited a major collection on Dante and Europe in collaboration with the European Union’s Committee of the Regions, the Italian Embassy, the Lazio Region, the National Research Council (CNR), Unioncamere, and other institutions.

== Work on Giovanni Battista Cavalcaselle ==
Veneziano's recent works also pay tribute to the Italian art historian Giovanni Battista Cavalcaselle (1819–1897), co-author with Joseph Archer Crowe of A History of Painting in Italy from the 12th to the 16th Century (1864). Veneziano studied Cavalcaselle's notebooks, drawings, and sketches, preserved in Venice’s Marciana Library and London's National Art Library, and produced a new series of paintings inspired by Cavalcaselle’s art historical insights. This series, titled Painting Cavalcaselle. A Third-Hand (and Third Life) Work, debuted at Venice’s Marciana National Library from November 17 to December 12, 2023.

== Personal exhibitions ==
- 2013, Rome - Ecos Gallery: L'ANIMA DEI NON LUOGHI, with an introduction by Achille Bonito Oliva e critic note by Marc Augé, curated by Flavio Alivernini;
- 2014, Bruxelles - Institute of Italian Culture: NON-PLACES-NO LOGOS, with an introduction by Derrick de Kerckhove;
- 2015, Paris - Espace en Cours - 2015: DANTE, AND OTHER VISIONS, curated by Julie Heintz;
- 2016, Saint Petersburg - Gallery "Nevskij 8": THE CODES OF THE SOUL, curated by Francesco Attolini;
- 2016, Puglia/Basilicata (Maratea, Policoro, Polignano a Mare, Alberobello): BORN UNDER THE SIGN OF..., curated by Raffaella Salato;
- 2017, Saint Petersburg - Gallery "Nevskij 8" - 2017, February : SIGNS, LOGOS AND CORRUPTIONS, curated by Raffaella Salato;
- 2017, Rome, Roman Houses of the Celio, in agreement with the Ministry of Cultural Heritage and the Ministry of the Interior: PIETAS, curated by Raffaella Salato;
- 2017, Lanzhou - China, National Gallery of contemporary Art, SIGNS, curated by Wu Weidong;
- 2019, Amboise - France, Eglise Saint-Florentin, 2019, LEONARDO ATLANTICO, in agreement with the City of Amboise, of the Loire Regions, and under the patronage of the President of the French Republic and the Louvre Museum, curated by Francesca Barbi Marinetti, Niccolò Lucarelli, Raffaello Salato;
- 2019, Tunis, Italian Cultural Institute, LEONARDO ATLANTICO, in agreement with the Italian Embassy of Italy;
- 2019, Milan, Biblioteca Ambrosiana, LEONARDO ATLANTICO, in agreement with Ministry of Culture, curated by Francesca Barbi Marinetti, Niccolò Lucarelli, Raffaella Salato;
- 2021, Florence, Biblioteca Nazionale Centrale, ISBN DANTE AND OTHER VISIONS, in agreement with Ministry of Culture, curated by Francesca Barbi Marinetti, Niccolò Lucarelli, Raffaella Salato;
- 2021-2022, Matera, Mavinni-Malvezzi National Museum, HETEROTOPIAS, curated by Francesca Barbi Marinetti;
- 2022, Rome, Tiber Island, LE GEORGICHE, IN THE TIBER ISLAND, in agreement with Regione Lazio, curated by Francesca Barbi Marinetti and Raffaella Salato;
- 2023, Bruxelles, UE-European Committee of the Regions, ERA SMARRITA. DANTE, EUROPE AND OTHER SKIES, curated by Francesca Barbi Marinetti;
- 2023, Venice, Biblioteca Nazionale Marciana, PAINTING CAVALCASELLE. A THIRD HAND (AND THIRD LIFE) WORK, in agreement with Ministry of Culture, curated by Francesca Barbi Marinetti and Lucia Calzona.
