= Corrado Miraglia =

Italian opera singer (1821–1881)

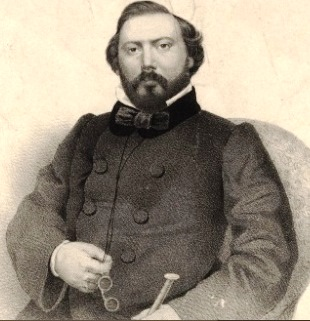
- Born: 1821; Palermo, Kingdom of the Two Sicilies
- Died: 30 December 1881 (aged 59–60); Milan, Kingdom of Italy
- Occupation: Opera singer
- Spouse: Giuseppina Brambilla (m. 1857)

Corrado Miraglia (1821 – 31 December 1881) was an Italian operatic tenor and, in his later years, a voice teacher and theatrical agent. He is best known today for having created the role of Ismaele in Verdi's opera Nabucco, although he sang in the world premieres of several other lesser-known works. He was married to fellow opera singer Giuseppina Brambilla.

== Life and career ==
Miraglia was born in Palermo. Little has been recorded of his life and career prior to his performance in the world premiere of Nabucco in March 1842, apart from his appearance earlier that year as Ivanhoe in Nicolai's Il templario at the Teatro Sociale in Mantua. He was only 21 when he sang this leading tenor role in Mantua, and a contemporary critic noted that his performance had been hampered by severe stage fright.

Whatever his problems in Mantua, he went on to a career singing many more leading tenor roles, albeit largely in provincial Italian theatres. These included Nemorino in L'elisir d'amore, Idreno in Semiramide, Ramiro in La Cenerentola, Fernando in La favorita, and the title roles in Ernani and Robert le diable. Of the major Italian opera houses, he appeared at the Teatro San Carlo in Naples in the 1850 season singing the title role in Vincenzo Moscuzza's Stradella il trovatore, Lindoro in L'italiana in Algeri, and Ernesto in Don Pasquale, and appeared at the Teatro Regio in Turin in the 1853 carnival season singing Aménophis in Mosè in Egitto and the title role in Pacini's Buondelmonte. From the autumn of 1853 through 1855, he was based in Lisbon, where he sang multiple leading roles at the Teatro São Carlos. During this time, an album of seven songs for voice and piano entitled Una notte sul Tago and composed by Miraglia on themes from his native Sicily was published in Lisbon.

In 1857, Miraglia married the contralto Giuseppina Brambilla, one of five sisters who were all opera singers. He retired from the stage in 1862 and took up a post as the tenor soloist in the Cathedral of Milan choir. He remained there until 1872 despite a very low salary and frequent bouts of ill health. Shortly after he took up the post, Raimondo Boucheron, the cathedral's maestro di cappella, wrote that Miraglia's "singing technique and musical knowledge could have graced the most distinguished of cathedrals", and that he considered himself extremely fortunate that Miraglia had chosen to perform in his cathedral. In 1876 Boucheron dedicated to Miraglia his Il sabato verso sera (canon for six voices: three sopranos and three tenors).

In the last ten years of his life, Miraglia taught singing (amongst his pupils were Francisco and António D'Andrade) and also worked as a theatrical agent, occupying much of his time with the careers of his niece Teresina Brambilla and her husband, the composer Amilcare Ponchielli. Miraglia died in Milan at the age of 60.

== Roles created ==
The following is a list of roles known to have been created by Miraglia. He was also to have created the role of Lamberto in Ubaldo di Valnera at La Scala on 18 March 1848. However, the premiere was cancelled following the outbreak of the Five Days of Milan uprising that same day. The opera was never again performed, and its composer, Paul Lacroix, disappeared from the music scene.

- Ismaele in Verdi's Nabucco, La Scala, Milan, 9 March 1842
- Luigi Capponi in Antonio Ronzi's Luisa Strozzi. Teatro San Benedetto, Venice, 1844
- Il conte di San Megrino in Francesco Chiaromonte's Caterina di Clèves, Teatro del Fondo, Naples, 21 July 1850
- Roberto Bruzio (Robert the Bruce) in Giulio Litta's Edita di Lorno, Teatro Carlo Felice, Genoa, 1 June 1853
- Azim-Bethim in Francisco Xavier Migone's Mocana, Teatro São Carlos, Lisbon, 26 April 1854
- Stefano in Domenico Thorner's Stefano Duca di Bari, Teatro São Carlos, Lisbon, 14 January 1855
