= Carbonara di Po =

Municipality in Lombardy, Italy

- Comune
- Comune di Carbonara di Po
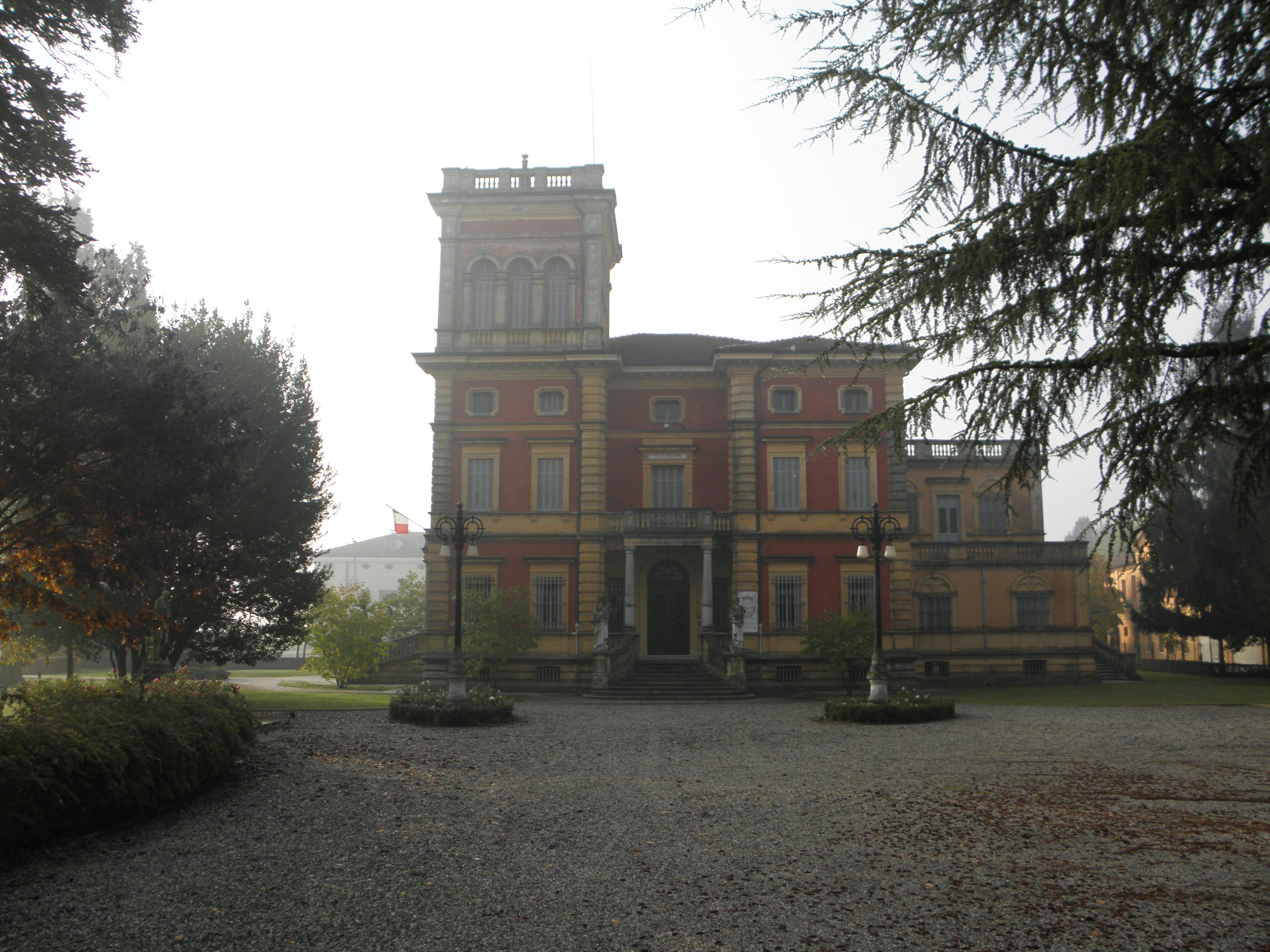
- Town hall, housed by Villa Bisighini.

- Location within Italy Location within Lombardy
- Coordinates: 45°4′N 11°13′E
- Country: Italy
- Region: Lombardy
- Province: Mantua (MN)
- Frazioni: Cavo, Carbonarola

Government
  - Mayor: Paola Motta

Area
  - Total: 15.43 km^{2} (5.96 sq mi)
- Elevation: 14 m (46 ft)

Population (30 September 2017)
  - Total: 1,254
  - Density: 81.27/km^{2} (210.5/sq mi)
- Demonym: Carbonaresi
- Time zone: UTC+1 (CET)
  - Summer (DST): UTC+2 (CEST)
- Postal code: 46020
- Dialing code: 0386
- Website: Official website

Carbonara di Po (Lower Mantovano: Carbunera) is a comune (municipality) in the Province of Mantua in the Italian region Lombardy, located about 170 kilometres (110 mi) east of Milan and about 35 kilometres (22 mi) southeast of Mantua.

Carbonara di Po borders the following municipalities: Bergantino, Borgofranco sul Po, Castelnovo Bariano, Magnacavallo, Sermide e Felonica.
