= Giuseppina Brambilla =

Italian opera singer (1819–1903)

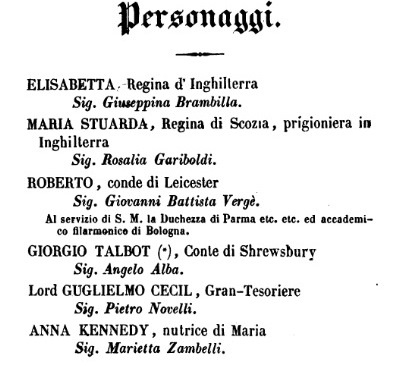
- Cast of Donizetti's Maria Stuarda with Brambilla as Elisabetta, performed at the Teatro Grande, Barcelona in 1843
- Born: 9 May 1819; Cassano d'Adda, Lombardy–Venetia, Austrian Empire
- Died: April 1903; Milan, Lombardy, Kingdom of Italy
- Occupation: Opera singer
- Spouse: Corrado Miraglia (m. 1857; died 1881)
- Relatives: Teresa Brambilla (sister); Marietta Brambilla (sister); Teresina Brambilla (niece)

Giuseppina (or Giuseppa) Brambilla (Note: Her first name has been rendered in various 19th-century French sources as Peppina or Pepina. She is also sometimes confused with another 19th-century contralto, Gaetanina Brambilla, who was not related to her.) (9 May 1819 – April 1903) was an Italian opera singer who, like her sisters Marietta and Teresa Brambilla, sang leading roles in the major opera houses in Italy, Spain, France and England. Although often described in modern reference works as a contralto, she also sang many soprano roles including Marie in La fille du régiment and Abigaille in Nabucco. She married the tenor Corrado Miraglia in 1857 and retired from the stage in 1862. Her niece, Teresina Brambilla, was also an opera singer.

== Life and career ==
Brambilla was born in Cassano d'Adda, the daughter of Gerolamo and Angela (née Columbo) Brambilla. She was the fourth of five sisters, all of whom became opera singers. Marietta (1807–1875) was a contralto who specialised in travesti roles. Teresa (1813–1895) was a soprano who created the role of Gilda in Rigoletto. Both had very prominent careers. Annetta (1812–?) and Lauretta (1823–1881) were both sopranos who had lesser careers, appearing primarily in provincial Italian opera houses. (Note: Lauretta (or Laura) Brambilla had the shortest career of the five sisters. She attended the Milan Conservatory but was very unhappy there and eventually left before finishing her course. She appeared on stage in Milan and Venice in 1844–45, but then retired to marry and raise a family. She died of cancer at the age of 56.)

The family moved to Milan in 1828, and Giuseppina had hoped to train at the Milan Conservatory where both Marietta and Teresa had gone. However, she was not accepted when she auditioned in 1833 (as one of 28 candidates for 3 places) and consequently studied singing privately. Her first public appearance was in Vienna on 13 May 1839 when she sang with her sister Marietta in a concert celebrating the name day of Prince Metternich. She made her operatic debut in August 1840 at the Teatro Ricciardi in Bergamo, singing the soprano role of Sinaide in Rossini's Mosè in Egitto, a role she repeated in October of that year at the Teatro Grande in Trieste. The following month, she appeared there in the contralto role of Maffio Orsini in Donizetti's Lucrezia Borgia, a role which had been created by her sister Marietta in 1833.

She appeared in Rome's Teatro Apollo, again as Sinaide, in January 1841, and in April made her La Scala debut as Lisa in La sonnambula. Later in the season there she created the role of Elisa in Giuseppe Manusardi's Il biricchino di Parigi. She then left for Spain, where she was the leading prima donna in multiple productions in Barcelona from November 1841 until January 1845. She then sang for a season in Valencia before returning to Italy by way of Paris and London. She made her London debut in July 1846 at Her Majesty's Theatre reprising the role of Maffio Orsini in Lucrezia Borgia. Her Paris debut followed in October of that year when she appeared at the Théâtre-Italien as Abigaille in Nabucco.

On her return to Italy, she sang in several provincial theatres before accepting a contract as the prima donna with the Italian opera company at the City Theatre in Odessa, where she was particularly popular and appeared in multiple leading soprano roles from 1850 through 1851. The 1852–1853 season found her in Jassy (now a city in Romania), where again she proved very popular. She returned to Jassy in the 1855 season to appear in four more operas, including Il trovatore where she sang the role of Leonora with the Italian tenor Corrado Miraglia as Manrico. She married Miraglia in 1857 and retired from the stage five years later. Her last performances were at the Teatro Carlo Felice in Genoa, where she sang Isabelle in Robert le diable, Delizia in Ricci's Corrado d'Altamura, and Amina in La sonnambula. Miraglia died in 1881. Brambilla lived on for another 20 years. Her death in Milan at the age of 84 was announced on 11 April 1903.
