= Corrado Giannantoni =

Italian physicist

Corrado Giannantoni (born 1950) is an Italian nuclear scientist.

== Early life and education ==
Giannantoni was born at Gioia dei Marsi (Central Italy) in 1950. He attended primary school in that little village and high school at St. Mary's College in Rome.

He graduated with honors in nuclear engineering at La Sapienza University of Rome in 1977. After a short period of teaching atomic physics and nuclear plants at Enrico Fermi Institute in Frascati (Rome), he began working for the ENEA (Italian Agency for New Technology, Energy and the Environment) in 1978 in the field of Fast Reactor Safety (the French Superphenix and Italian PEC Reactors).

== Professional life ==
He was responsible for "out-of pile experiments" in the four-party agreement (France-Germany-Italy-England), from 1984 to 1990 and, subsequently, was Director of the "energetic Norms" Section, in the "Energy Saving" Division up to June 1995. In this latter period, as Consultant for the Italian Ministry of Industry for Energy Saving in Italy, he promoted the introduction (in ENEA) of advanced evaluation methodologies of Power Plants based on the physical quantities of Exergy and Emergy, and their corresponding micro and macro-economic Theories (Exergoeconomics and Emergoeconomics respectively). From June 1995 he worked in the "Engineering Division and Experimental Plants" as Project Manager of the so-called Integrated Multicriteria (Energetic-Exergetic-Emergetic-Economic) Approach. Since December 2001, as a member of the Technical-Scientific Unit termed as "Renewable Sources and Innovative Energetic Cycles", he has been dealing with evaluation methods of strategic options concerning both traditional and new alternative energy sources of "equipollent", such as hydrogen, for example.

In the last two years he has progressively intensified his activity of diffusion of new Mathematical Methods (Intensive and Incipient Fractional Calculus) for the solution to non-linear differential equations and their direct applications in several fields (from Quantum Mechanics to Electrical Mechanics, from Thermodynamics to Electromagnetism, etc.), in addition to their advantages when dealing with multi-phase Policy Models based on any number of Thermodynamic, Economic, Environmental and Juridical Indicators.
