= Stefano Gobatti =

Italian opera composer

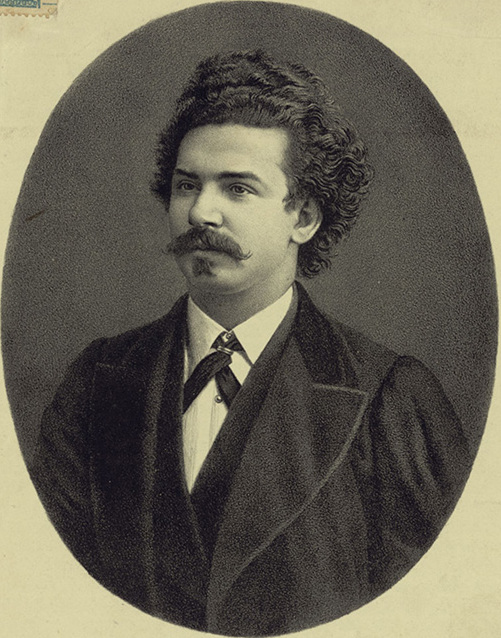
Stefano Gobatti

Stefano Gobatti (Bergantino, 5 July 1852 – Bologna, 17 December 1913) was an Italian opera composer.

Gobatti was born in 1852 in the Province of Rovigo in a poor and humble peasant family. He passionately studied music and immediately had results, and was taught under Giuseppe Busi and Lauro Rossi. At just eighteen, he composed the opera I goti which was staged on 30 November 1873 at the Teatro Comunale di Bologna. The work was an unprecedented success. Within a short period he was the "Freeman of the City of Bologna" and appointed Member of Honor of the Accademia Filarmonica in Bologna and appointed Knight of the Crown of Italy granted by King Vittorio Emanuele II. Under pressure from music publishers and their purely economic interests, his later works such as Luce (1875) and Cordelia (1881), were inevitably marked by conflicting adversity. Gobatti, disappointed and embittered, increasingly sought refuge in a Franciscan convent in the hills of Bologna, and lived there as a monk in extreme poverty. He died on 17 December 1913 and was buried at the Cimitero Monumentale Della Certosa.
