= Corrado Paina =

Italian-born poet based in Toronto (born 1954)

Corrado Paina (August 31 1954, Milan - April 12 2024, Toronto) was an Italian-born poet based in Toronto.

His writing reflects the changes of borders in life, sex and soul. His works have been published in Canada and Italy.

== Bibliography ==
=== Poetry collections published ===
- Hoarse Legend, 2000
- The Dowry of Education, 2004
- The Alphabet of the Traveler, 2006
- Souls in Plain Clothes, 2008
- Cinematic Taxi, 2015
- Largo Italia
- L'alfabeto del Viaggiatore
- A Toast to Illness

=== Short story collections ===
- Di Corsa (Monteleone/Mapograph – Vibo Valentia)
- Tempo Rubato (Atelier 14 – Milano)
- Darsena Inquinata (Moderata Durant – Latina)

=== Novels ===
- Tra Rothko e Tre Finestre" (Ibiskos)
- Abecedario (etchings by Sandro Martini)
- Between Rothko and three windows

=== Plaquettes ===
- "Il Pulcino e L'elefante" of Alberto Casiraghi,
- "i Quaderni d'Orfeo" of Roberto Dossi and Luciano Ragozzino
- "Il Ragazzo Innocuo" of Dario Borso

=== Editor ===
- College Street – Little Italy – The Renaissance Strip (Mansfield Press) finalist of the Toronto Heritage Award
