= Leticia Brambila Paz =

Mexican mathematician

Gloria Leticia Brambila Paz (born 1953) is a Mexican mathematician specializing in algebraic geometry and the moduli of algebraic curves. She is a professor in the Centro de Investigación en Matemáticas (CIMAT) in Guanajuato, Mexico.

== Education and career ==
Brambila was born on 26 January 1953. She went to Swansea University in the United Kingdom for doctoral study in mathematics, completing her PhD in 1986 with the dissertation Homomorphisms of Vector Bundles over Compact Riemann Surface supervised by Alan Thomas.

She worked as an assistant professor at the National Autonomous University of Mexico from 1973 to 1976, and as a professor of mathematics at UAM Iztapalapa in Mexico City from 1983 to 1998, when she moved to her present position at CIMAT. She also became a life fellow of Clare Hall, Cambridge in 2011.

== Recognition ==
Brambila was elected to the Mexican Academy of Sciences in 2001.
