= Corrado Correggi =

Italian businessman, football agent and club owner

Corrado Correggi is an Italian businessman, football agent and football club owner.

He owns Algarve United, which he founded in 2004. He founded the club in partnership with his Scottish father-in-law, John McGovern, who is also a football agent.

Correggi developed business activity in corks for fine wine.

Correggi named his team, Algarve United, after the lynx, and has promised to donate 10% of the club's gate receipts and membership fees to lynx conservation.
