= Oreste Casalini =

Italian painter and sculptor (1962–2020)

- Born: 9 July 1962; Naples, Italy
- Died: 19 July 2020 (aged 58); Rome, Italy
- Occupations: Painter, sculptor

Oreste Casalini (9 July 1962 – 19 July 2020) was an Italian painter and sculptor.
