= Corrado Fumagalli =

Italian television presenter

- Born: July 27, 1967 (age 58); Cassano d'Adda, Italy
- Occupations: Television presenter, DJ, producer
- Known for: Sexy Bar (1999–present); Founder of 18vm.tv; Director of InterTV
- Notable work: Alla Grande! (2012)

Corrado Fumagalli (born in Cassano d'Adda, Italy 27 July 1967) is an Italian television presenter.

== Career ==
From 1984 until 1993, he began to DJ for various Italian radio stations. Before launching his career as a TV presenter, he opened several nightclubs in Bergamo that attracted considerable public success. He arrived later to become the presenter of the erotic fair MiSex. Completed the collaboration with MiSex since 2007, he organised BergamoSex, the feast of friends of SexyBar, with a great audience and fans. He produces and hosts the programme Sexy bar aired every night since 1999 on several channels throughout Italy and on satellite. In 2008, he opened 18vm.tv, the first erotic web TV in Italy and in 2010, he developed the idea of creating a free thematic TV channel devoted exclusively to the Internazionale Milano team on digital terrestrial television: InterTV. Fumagalli assumed the role of director with Andrea Bosio as Deputy Director. The broadcasts start officially on 10 September. In December 2012, he released his autobiographical book Alla Grande!.

== Bibliography ==
- Alla Grande! (2012)
