= Joseph Cassani =

Spanish Catholic historian

Joseph Cassani (also spelt Casani, 26 November 1673 – 1750) was a Spanish Catholic historian.

== Life ==
Cassani was born in Madrid in 1673, entered the Society of Jesus on 16 November 1686, was still in active service of priestly functions in 1745, and died in 1750. He was one of the founders of the Academia de la Lengua española (Academy of the Spanish Language) at Madrid.

He was a member of the Academia from 6 July 1713.

== Works ==
Cassani published a Diccionario de la Lengua Catellana (Catalan dictionary) in 1726–1730, in six volumes.

Cassani's Historia de la Provincia de la Compañia de Jesús del Nueva Reyno de Granada en la América (Madrid, 1741) is the only regular chronicle of the Jesuit Order in Colombia thus far extant. The fact that Cassani was never in the New World detracts somewhat from the usefulness of this otherwise valuable history, as far as ethnological and ethnographic data are concerned; but it does include data on the missions in the upper Orinoco basin. The work is exceedingly rare.

Cassani's other works include:

- Admirable vida, singulares virtudes etc. del extçtico Varon P. Dionisio Rickel (Madrid, 1738)
- Varones ilustres de la Compañia de Jesus Escual militar de fortificacion Tratado de la naturaleza y orígen de los cometas (Madrid, 1737).

== Sources ==
- Sommervogel-de Backer, Bibl. des éscriv. de la c. de J.
- Diccionario Hispano-americano
- Salvç; Catçlogo de la Biblioteca de Salvç (Valencia, 1874)
- Acosta, Compendia hist. del Descub. y Coloniz., de la Nueva Granada (Paris, 1848)
- Brinton, The American Race (New York, 1891)
