= Corrado Merli =

Italian footballer (born 1959)

- Merli with Rimini in 1981

Personal information
- Date of birth: 17 October 1959 (age 67)
- Place of birth: Pegognaga, Italy
- Height: 1.76 m (5 ft 9 in)
- Position: Defender

Senior career*
Years	Team	Apps	(Gls)
1977–1978	Mantova	3	(0)
1978–1982	Rimini	73	(2)
1982–1984	Brescia	32	(0)
1984–1987	Carrarese	94	(1)
1987–1990	Fidelis Andria	67	(2)
1990–1991	Giulianova	31	(1)
1991–1993	Santegidiese	64	(2)
- * Club domestic league appearances and goals as of 17 May 2019 (UTC)

Corrado Merli (Italian pronunciation: [korˈraːdo ˈmɛrli]; born 17 October 1959) is an Italian former footballer.

== Club career ==
After his 1977 debut with Mantova, in the autumn of 1978 he joined Rimini. The team was relegated to Serie C in the 1978–1979 season, but Merli secured a spot amongst the reserves until Rimini was promoted again to Serie B in 1979–1980. He then joined the first team for the next two Serie B seasons, until he transferred to Brescia to play two more seasons of Serie C1.

His careers continued in Serie C1, playing three years with Carrarese and then with Fidelis Andria, winning the Serie C2 Championship in 1988–1989. He then played another year in Serie C2 with Giulianova until finishing his career in Serie D with Santegidiese in 1993.

During his Serie B career with Rimini, he achieved a total of 65 appearances and 2 goals, with a grand total of 364 appearances and 8 goals throughout his professional football career.

== After Retirement ==
Despite retiring from professional football, Merli has taken part in multiple iterations of "Emanuele una partita per la vita", annual charity football event in favour of the Associazione Romagnola Cystic fibrosis, in which various showbiz personalities play a friendly match against former/current athletes from several different sports. The charity match takes place every year at the Stadio Romeo Neri in Rimini, Italy.
