= Gino Corradini =

Italian weightlifter

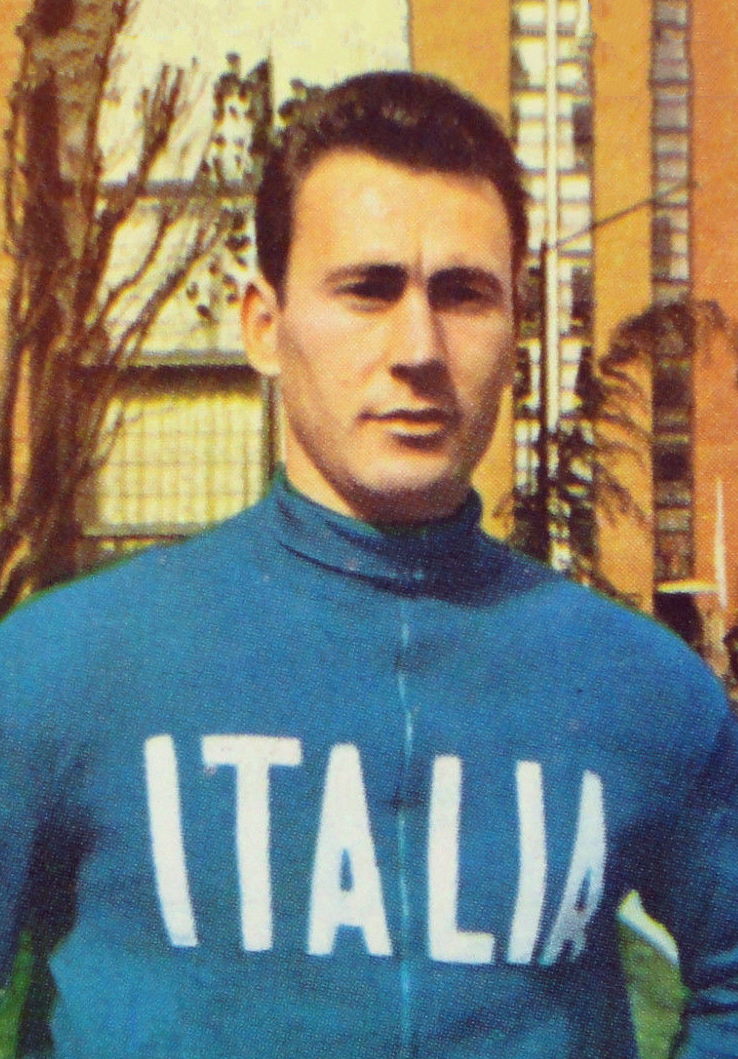

Personal information
- Born: 20 April 1941 (age 85) Bolzano, Italy
- Height: 1.77 m (5 ft 10 in)
- Weight: 83 kg (183 lb)

Sport
- Sport: Weightlifting
- Club: G.S. Fiamme Oro, Rome

Gino Corradini (born 20 April 1941) is a retired Italian weightlifter. He competed at the 1968 Summer Olympics in the light-heavyweight class and finished in 12th place.
