= Alfredo Keil =

Portuguese composer and painter (1850–1907)

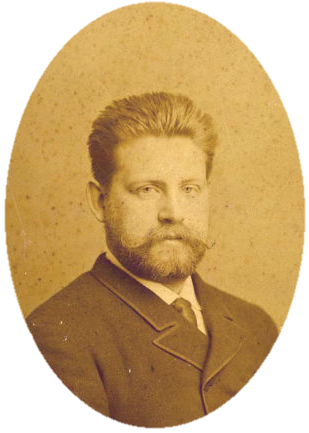
- Born: 3 July 1850; Lisbon, Kingdom of Portugal
- Died: 4 October 1907 (aged 57); Hamburg, German Empire
- Occupations: Composer, painter and poet
- Known for: Composer of the Portuguese national anthem

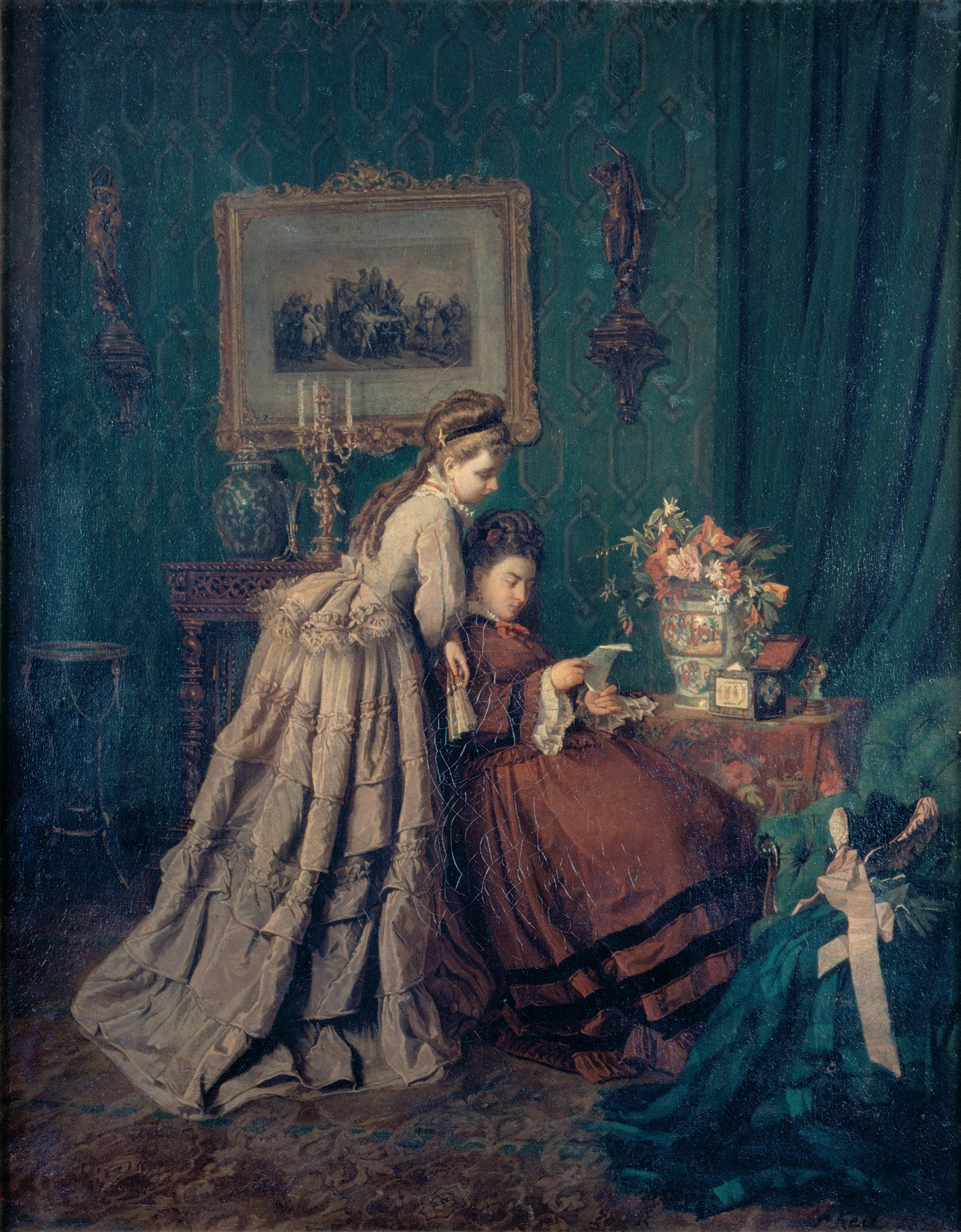
Reading of a Letter, Painting by Alfredo Keil

Alfredo Cristiano Keil (3 July 1850 – 4 October 1907) was a Portuguese composer, painter, poet, archaeologist and art collector. Keil is best known as the composer of the Portuguese national anthem, A Portuguesa.

== Life ==
Keil was born in Lisbon, the son of the tailor of the court, Johann Christian Keil (later João Cristiano Keil) and his wife Maria Josefina Stellflug, both of German origin. The boy developed an interest in both painting and music; at the age of 12 he composed the work Pensée Musicale and dedicated it to his mother.

After studying painting in Munich and Nuremberg with the German romantic painters Wilhelm von Kaulbach and August von Kreling, he returned to Portugal in 1870, due to the Franco-Prussian War. Back home, he developed into a sought-after romantic painter.

== Painter ==
At the time, the art world was moving towards Realism and Naturalist generation, but Keil still gained success with his melancholic intimate scenes and landscapes. Despite never becoming a full-time painter – also developing interests in poetry and musical composition – he continued painting and exhibiting throughout his life, and left hundreds of works.

Predominantly a landscape painter, he also painted other subjects such as the painting Leitura de uma carta (The reading of a letter) from 1874, which helped to establish him among the then dominant aristocracy as well as the wealthy bourgeoisie.

His work met with high demand. In 1878 he signed up for the Paris exhibition and in 1886 he participated in the Madrid Exhibition, receiving the Decoration of the Order of Charles III. The highlight of his painting career was a well-attended solo exhibition in Lisbon, which took place in 1890.

== Composer ==
In Portugal, Keil's status as a painter soon became overshadowed by his success in music and poetry. As a composer, he gained prominence and great success with his operas Donna Bianca (1888), Irene (1893) and Serrana (1899), then considered the best Portuguese opera.

Keil stood in close contact with composers such as Giuseppe Verdi, Giacomo Puccini, Pietro Mascagni and Jules Massenet – the latter the dedicatee of his successful opera Serrana. With this opera in Portuguese, whose title can be translated as "The Woman from the Mountains", he attempted to break the dominance of foreign-language opera from France, Italy and Germany and to establish Portugal as a musical culture nation. Serrana is set in around 1820 and is about a woman who is caught between two men from rival villages.

In 1890, Keil was provoked by the British ultimatum to Portugal to compose the patriotic song A Portuguesa, with lyrics by poet and playwright Henrique Lopes de Mendonça. The song became popular throughout the country and was officially adopted as the national anthem after the proclamation of the Republic in 1910.

Keil did not live to see this lasting success. In 1907, he died in Hamburg of the consequences of surgery to treat Esophageal cancer. Then still-reigning King Carlos I visited his funeral, along with many other artists. His grave is in the Cemitério dos Prazeres cemetery in Lisbon. A memorial plaque for Keil, now a national icon, was placed in the Jardim Alfredo Keil at Praça da Alegria, near Lisbon's central Avenida da Liberdade.

== Writer ==
Among Keil's publications, the book Tojos e Rosmaninhos stands out. It was a work in three volumes, inspired by the legends and traditions of the area of Ferreira do Zêzere, where Keil had spent much time and where he wrote the opera Serrana.

== Family ==
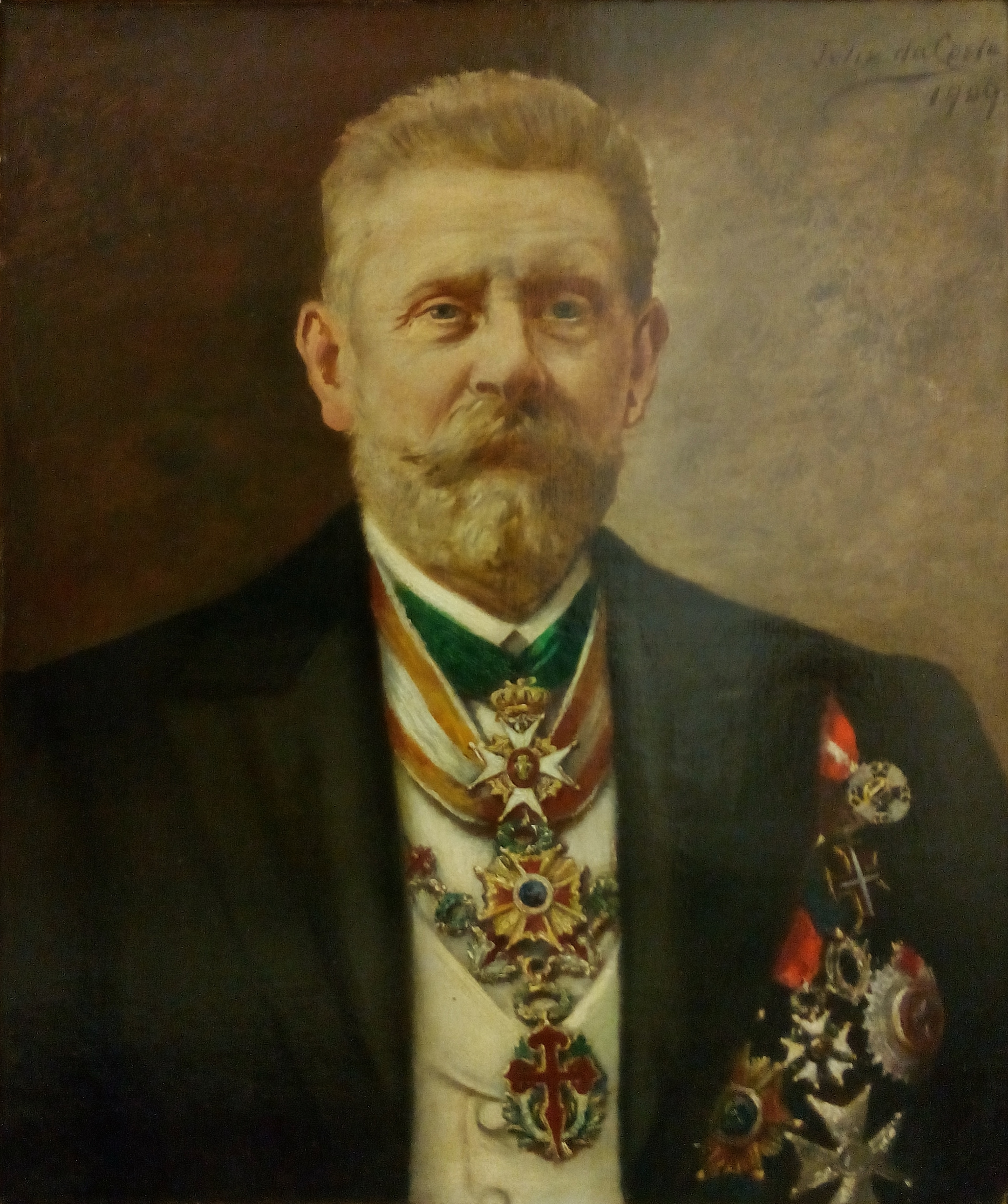
Portrait of Alfredo Keil by Félix da Costa (1909). Museum of Lisbon, Pimenta Palace.

Keil married Cleyde Maria Margarida Cinatti, daughter of Italian parents Giuseppe Luigi Cinatti and Margherita Rivolto. They had four children: Joana Maria Francisca Cinatti Keil, Guida Maria Josefina Cinatti Keil, Luís Cristiano Cinatti Keil and Paulo Henrique Cinatti Keil. Their son Luís (1881 – 1947) was an art historian and art critic, who collaborated with José de Figueiredo in establishing the Portuguese National Museum of Ancient Art.

== Compositions (selection) ==
=== Opera ===
- Susana, comic opera in 1 act (premiered 1883 in Lisbon)
- Donna Bianca, lyric drama in 4 acts (1893)
- Irena, lyrical drama in 4 acts (1893)
- Serrana, lyrical darma in 4 acts (1899)
- A Índia (unfinished)
- Simão Ruivo (unfinished)

=== Orchestral ===
- Patria, Secular Cantata for soloists, choir and orchestra (1884)
- Uma Caçada na Corte, symphonic poem (1885)
- Orientais, Secular Cantata for soloists, choir and orchestra (1886)
- A Portugueza, Hymn for soloists, choir and orchestra (1890)
- Hino do Infante D. Henrique, Hymn for soloists, choir and orchestra (1890)
- Marcha de Gualdim Pais (1895)
- Poema de Primavera, Secular Cantata for soloists, choir and orchestra (pub. 1930)
- A Morte, Incidental music for orchestra

=== Songs ===
- Six Mélodies, Op. 14
- Manuelinas, Song cycle
- Cantiga de Cego, Op. 101
- Sacrilégio, Op. 103
- Promessas, Op. 102

=== Other music ===
- Beauté in E major, for piano.
- O meu lindo país azul for piano (later adopted into A Portugueza)
- 12 Mélodies, Op. 9
- Impressions poétiques. Douze mélodies pour le piano seul, Op. 12, for piano.
- Fado, Op. 75
- À printemps in D major, for piano or 2 guitars.

== Paintings ==
List of paintings by Alfredo Keil (Portuguese Wikipedia)
