= Corradi =

Corradi is an Italian surname. Notable people with the surname include:

- Ana Corradi (born 1962), Argentine politician
- Bernardo Corradi (born 1976), Italian footballer
- Clorinda Corradi (1804–1877), Italian opera singer
- Ernesto Corradi, Italian modern pentathlete
- Giulio Cesare Corradi, 17th-century Italian opera librettist
- Giuseppe Corradi (1932–2002), Italian footballer and manager
- Ibar Pérez Corradi (born 1977), Argentine criminal
- Mattia Corradi (born 1990), Italian footballer
- Nelly Corradi (1914–1968), Italian opera singer and actress
- Orlando Corradi (1940–2018), Italian film director
- Roberto Corradi (born 1975), Italian footballer
- Sofia Corradi (1934–2025), Italian pedagogist
