= Corrado Casalini =

Italian footballer (born 1914)

Personal information
- Full name: Ivo Corrado Casalini
- Date of birth: 2 November 1914
- Place of birth: Bologna, Kingdom of Italy
- Date of death: ?
- Position: Midfielder

Senior career*
Years	Team	Apps	(Gls)
1936–1938	Prato	42	(1)
1938–1939	Siena	27	(1)
1939–1940	Juventus	9	(0)
1940–1941	Pro Vercelli	11	(0)
1941–1942	Cuneo		
- * Club domestic league appearances and goals

Ivo Corrado Casalini (born 2 November 1914) was an Italian professional football player. He was born in Bologna.
