= Teresa Brambilla =

Italian soprano (1813–1895)

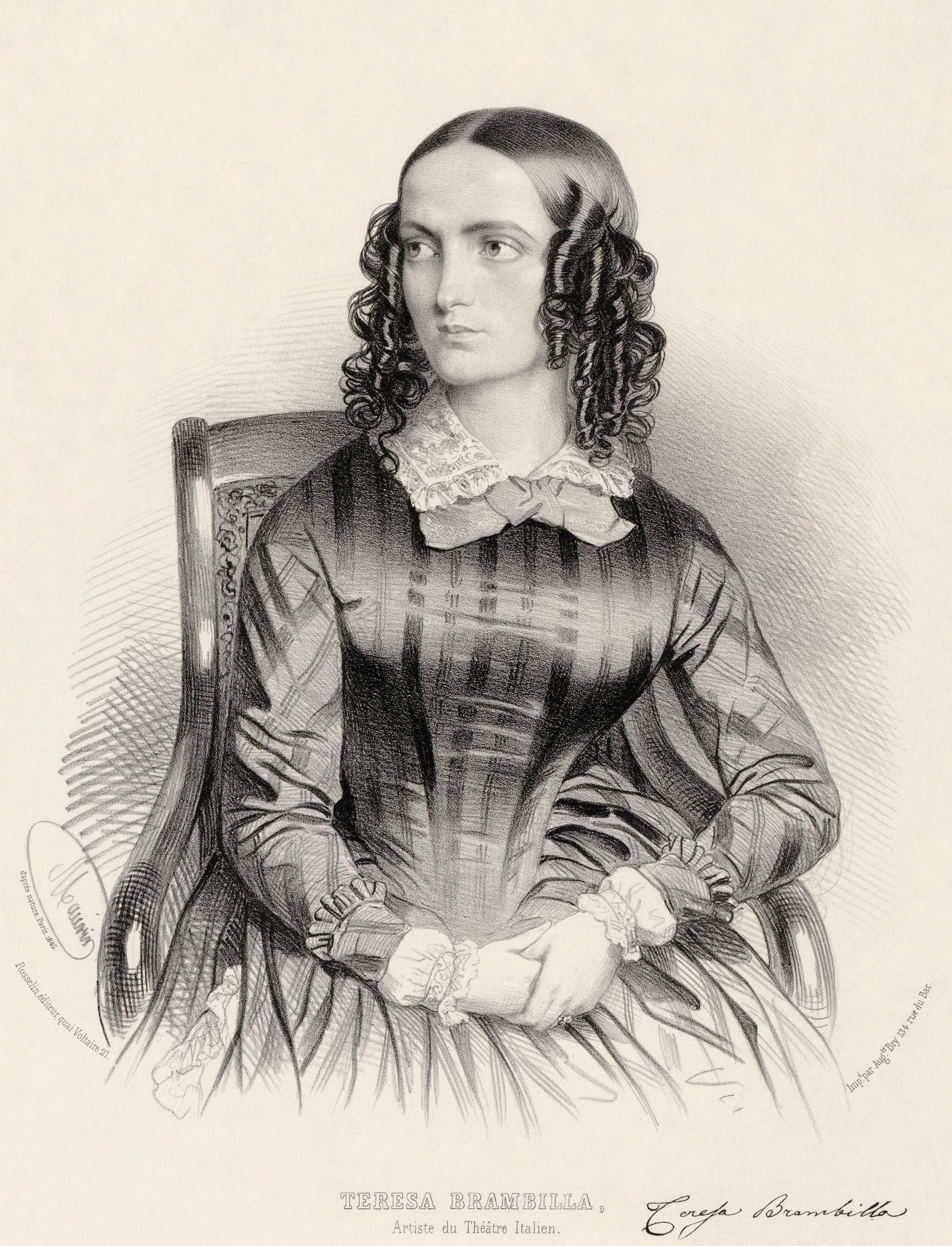
Teresa Brambilla circa 1845

Teresa Brambilla (23 October 1813 – 15 July 1895) was an Italian soprano best known for having first interpreted the role of Gilda in Giuseppe Verdi's opera Rigoletto. During a career that spanned 20 years, she sang throughout Italy and in other European cities, including Paris, Barcelona and Odessa.

== Life and career ==
Teresa Brambilla was born in Cassano d'Adda to a musical family. Her parents were Gerolamo and Angela (née Columbo) Brambilla. Teresa was one of five sisters who all became opera singers. Her elder sister, Marietta (1807–1875) was a contralto who specialised in travesti roles and sang in the premieres of several of Donizetti's operas. Her younger sister, Giuseppina (1819–1903) was a mezzo-soprano who appeared in major opera houses in Italy, Spain, and England. Her other two sisters, Annetta and Lauretta, were sopranos who had lesser careers, appearing primarily in Italian opera houses. Like her sisters, Teresa Brambilla studied at the Milan Conservatory, where she first became acquainted with Giuseppina Strepponi, a fellow student and the future wife of Giuseppe Verdi.

After her professional debut in 1831, Brambilla initially sang in several smaller opera houses in northern Italy but in 1833 scored a considerable success at Milan's Teatro Carcano singing Agnese in Bellini's Beatrice di Tenda and the leading soprano role in Fioravanti's Le cantatrici villane. She then appeared in Russia at the Odessa Opera House, which at the time specialised in Italian opera. Upon her return to Milan in 1837, she sang with her sister Marietta at La Scala in the world premiere of In morte di Maria Malibran de Bériot, a cantata in memory of Maria Malibran composed by Gaetano Donizetti, Giovanni Pacini, Saverio Mercadante, Nicola Vaccai and Pietro Antonio Coppola. After singing in Barcelona, she returned to La Scala for the 1839/1840 season in Mercadante's Le due illustri rivali and the world premieres of Mazzucato's I corsari and Coccia's Giovanna II.
