= Nicolò Corradini (composer) =

Italian composer and organist

Nicolò Corradini (c. 1585 in Cremona – 7 August 1646), was an Italian composer and organist of the early Baroque.

== Life ==
Corradini was a disciple of his predecessor Omobono Morsolino. He served as the organist to the Cremona Cathedral. Tarquinio Merula shaped the music scene in his hometown. In 1622, he directed the musical performances at the Accademia degli Animosi with a local noble who launched the institution. In 1635, he became kapellmeister for Merula as "maestro di Cappella delle Laudi".

== Works ==
- Alcuni concertati con instromenti, Book 1 - a collection of motets. (Venice, 1613)
- Ricercari a 4 (Venice, 1615)
- Madrigali, con sinfonie de viole (Venice, 1620)
- Primo libro de Canzoni Francese a 4 & alcune Suonate (Venice, 1624)

== Recordings ==
- Cremona e la sua tutela celeste Music for the Cremona's Cathedral (1610-1620). Psalms and motets by N. Corradini and Bernardo Corsi. L'aura soave Cremona.
- Corradini: 12 Ricercari & Mattia Vendi: Canzoni Federico Del Sordo (organ/harpshichord)
