= Borgofranco sul Po =

- Comune
- Comune di Borgofranco sul Po
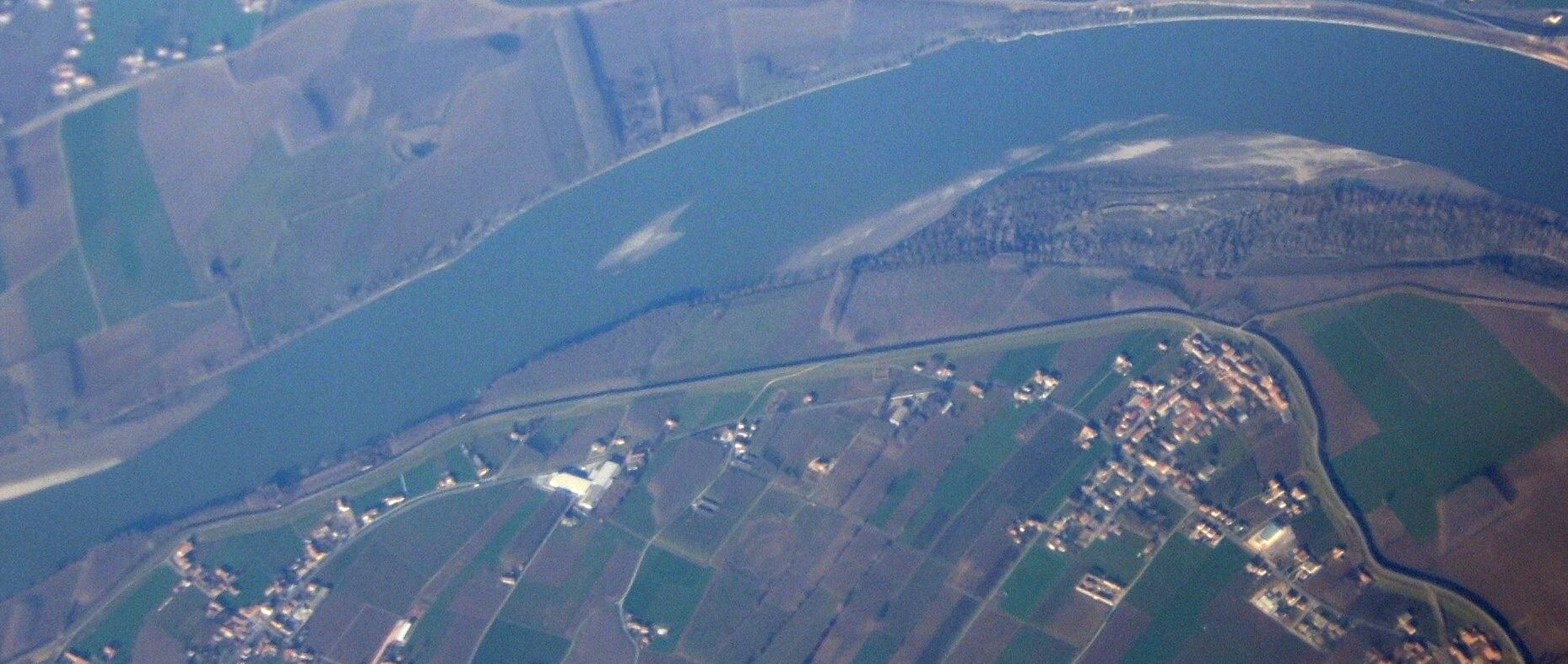
- View of Borgofranco sul Po

- Coat of arms

- Location within Italy Location within Lombardy
- Coordinates: 45°2′N 11°12′E
- Country: Italy
- Region: Lombardy
- Province: Mantua (MN)
- Frazioni: Bonizzo

Government
  - Mayor: Lisetta Superbi

Area
  - Total: 15.07 km^{2} (5.82 sq mi)
- Elevation: 14 m (46 ft)

Population (30 September 2017)
  - Total: 761
  - Density: 50.5/km^{2} (131/sq mi)
- Demonym: Borgofranchesi
- Time zone: UTC+1 (CET)
  - Summer (DST): UTC+2 (CEST)
- Postal code: 46020
- Dialing code: 0386
- Website: Official website

Borgofranco sul Po (Lower Mantovano: Bufranch) is a comune (municipality) in the Province of Mantua in the Italian region Lombardy, located about 170 kilometres (110 mi) southeast of Milan and about 35 kilometres (22 mi) southeast of Mantua.

Borgofranco sul Po borders the following municipalities: Bergantino, Carbonara di Po, Magnacavallo, Melara, Ostiglia, Borgo Mantovano.
