= Cassano d'Adda =

Cassano d'Adda Cassan su l'Adda (Lombard)
- Comune
- Città di Cassano d'Adda
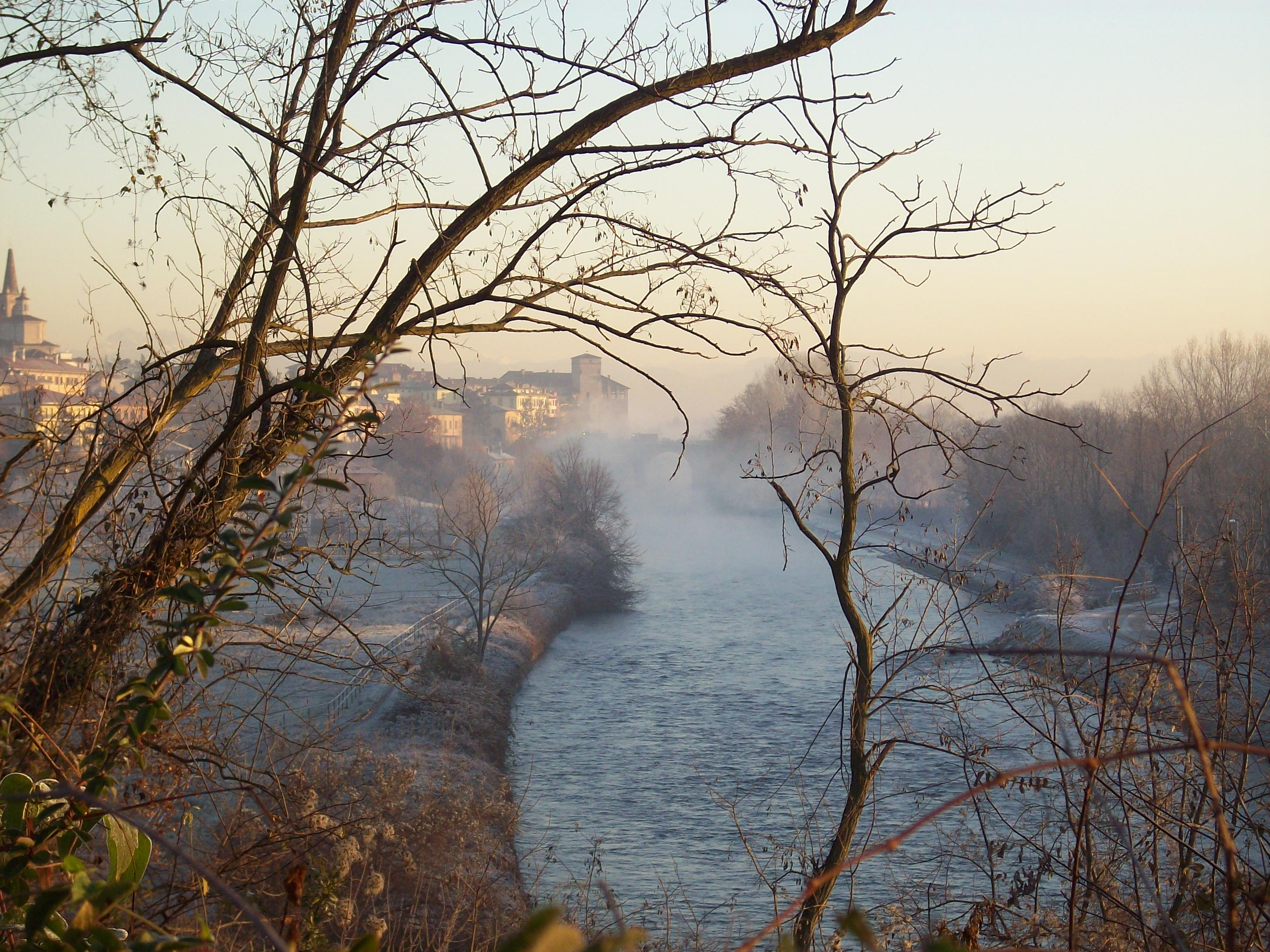

- Coat of arms

- Location within Italy Location within Lombardy
- Coordinates: 45°32′N 09°31′E
- Country: Italy
- Region: Lombardy
- Metropolitan city: Milan (MI)
- Frazioni: Groppello d'Adda, Cascine San Pietro

Government
  - Mayor: Fabio Colombo

Area
  - Total: 18.60 km^{2} (7.18 sq mi)
- Elevation: 133 m (436 ft)

Population (1 January 2022)
  - Total: 19,181
  - Density: 1,031/km^{2} (2,671/sq mi)
- Demonym: Cassanese(i)
- Time zone: UTC+1 (CET)
  - Summer (DST): UTC+2 (CEST)
- Postal code: 20062
- Dialing code: 0363
- Website: Official website

Cassano d'Adda (Milanese: Cassan su l'Adda; Bergamasque: Cassà) is a town and comune in the Metropolitan City of Milan, Lombardy, Italy, located on the right side of the Adda River. It is on the border of the Metropolitan City of Milan and the province of Bergamo. It is served by Cassano d'Adda railway station.

== Geography ==
The territory of Cassano d'Adda is divided into two parts, which are both characterised by a difference in height of 20–25 meters, by the river Adda. The river, which still flows in a deep crack in Vaprio, stretches out in a wide riverbed in Cassano, in which its waters split into several branches separated by rocky and wooded islets.

== Origins of the name ==
Other etymological variations of its name thrived in time:

1. "Casa sana": from which derives the name Cas-sano;
2. Cassanum: from which derives the name Cassano;
3. Cassianum, which derives from the ancient gens Cassia;
4. Cassium, probably the Latin name of a superintendent of a composite "mansion", from which derives the town emblem with the "three houses" (however, it is interesting how the nearby town of Treviglio presents many evolutionary similarities).

== History ==
The first documentary record of the existence of Cassano is the Carlomanno charter from 887 AD.

Due to its strategic position at a crossing of the Adda river, a number of historic battles took place in Cassano:

- in 268 AD, before the city was founded, the Roman Emperor Gallienus defeated the usurper Aureolus near the bridge crossing, but was killed after the battle by a conspiracy instigated by Aureolus;
- in 1158, Frederick Barbarossa fought against the Milan people in Cassano;
- in 1259, the Guelph League fought against the Ghibellines under Ezzelino III da Romano;
- in 1705, the French under Vendôme defeated the Imperial forces under Prince Eugene of Savoy during the War of the Spanish Succession; the strategist Folard was severely wounded in this battle;
- in 1799, the Austrians and Russians under Suvorov defeated the French under Moreau during the French Revolutionary Wars (the Battle of Cassano d'Adda); but the Cassano bridgehead was fought exclusively by Austrian troops, not involving the Russians.

Other historical people who stopped in Cassano include Napoleon Bonaparte in 1796 and 1807, and King Victor Emmanuel II and Emperor Napoleon III in 1859, just before the Battle of Solferino.

== Linificio ==
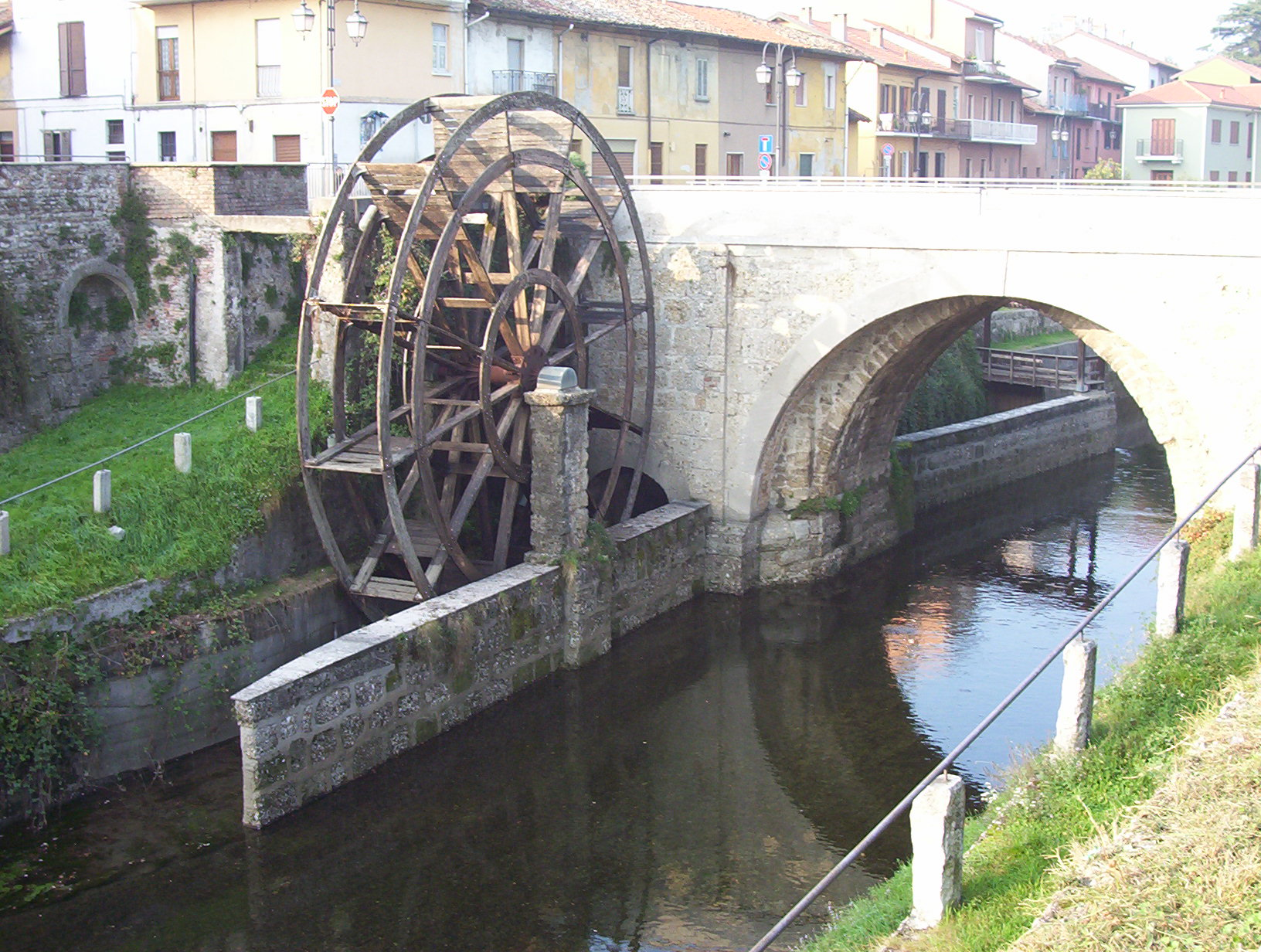
A watermill on the Naviglio Martesana in the frazione Groppello d'Adda

Two artificial canals (the Muzza Canal on the south-east border and the Naviglio Martesana on the northern border) connect the Adda River with Lodi and Milan respectively, making Cassano an important agricultural town and then (thanks to hydroelectric power) an industrial one during the 19th century. The Linificio is a monument to this industrial past, with its 'worker village', very similar in concept to Crespi d'Adda.

== Monuments and main sights ==
=== Religious architectures ===
The bell tower and the church of the Immaculate Conception and Saint Zeno

The bell tower of Cassano d'Adda was commissioned by Beatrice Regina della Scala in 1381, in a period which was marked by the passage from the Lombard Romanesque style to the Gothic one. The bell tower is 42 metres high and represents a national monument. It originally served also as a lookout post on Gera d'Adda; that is the reason why it was open at the top. In 1861, the parish of Don Milani equipped the tower with the current complex of eight bells.

The church of Saint Anthony

It houses some of Legnanino's paintings and the wooden altar of Friar Francis of Cedrate.

The church of Saint Denis

With frescoes by Fiamminghini and Cinisello.

=== Civil buildings ===
Cornaggia-Medici Palace

It houses the town hall.

Berva Palace

It is a nineteenth-century building with its façade looking onto the Belvedere. According to the Status Animarum, it seems that the palace had not been built yet in 1833, even though the Berva family had already bought the lands. It is one of the most majestic architectures of the town. On the opposite side of the Belvedere, the palace borders the block of flats built into the Lega Lombarda square; one can even access Saint Denis square through a courtyard and, therefore, Vittorio Veneto street. It currently houses the headquarters of the local band, of the ALS, of the ANA (the Italian association of alpine soldiers) and hosts several cultural and artistic initiatives. The first floor of the palace is decorated with refined frescoes.

Villa Brambilla

It is one of the oldest palaces of Cassano d'Adda, which was commissioned by Don Matteo Rosales, the marquis of Castelleone, in the second half of the 17th century. During the following century, it was transformed into a noble holiday residence by the Milanese aristocrat Giuseppe Pezzoli. Based on a simple map, it consists of a single block with an elongated linear development of almost 50 metres. It's back on Verdi street is flat and lacking ornaments, while the façade looking on the Muzza displays decorations and ornamental motifs in the Rococo style.

==== Villa d'Adda-Borromeo ====
The neoclassical Villa d'Adda Borromeo is the other excellent sight in this town. It counts 142 rooms for a total of 500 square meters and a 7-hectare park: this residence was commissioned by the d'Adda marquises in the mid-eighteenth century, probably based on a project by Francesco Croce and reworked by Giuseppe Piermarini (the designer of the Treatro alla Scala, of Milan's Palazzo Reale and of Monza's Villa Reale) in the second half of that same century.

=== Military buildings ===
==== Castello Visconteo of Cassano d'Adda ====
The most important landmark in Cassano is the Borromeo Castle (also known as Castello Visconteo), built around 1000 AD and progressively expanded. In the 15th century, Francesco I Sforza asked architect Bartolomeo Gadio (who also worked on the Milan Cathedral, the Sforza Castle and the Soncino castle) to redesign it extensively. Afterwards, it became the possession of Venetians, Spanish, Austrians, and of the Italian noble families d'Adda, Castaldo, Bonelli and Borromeo.

=== Others ===
The Dolphin Fountain

It was created in the Fascist era and is now located in Garibaldi square. It was accurately restored in 1996, the year during which two statues representing the Adda river and the Muzza canal were placed on the two sides of the Dolphin in the place of the two terracotta amphorae.

The portal of the Ricetto

In 1764, the attorney general of the fiefdom of Cassano had the old portal, which led into the Ricetto (the old remains of the bridge that allowed the entrance to the castle area), demolished and had the grand door with the emblem of the Bonelli family constructed. The project satisfies the mentality according to which one should open the interiors of the Medieval walls, to open the villages and accommodate new constructions. Like this, Cassano moved the axes of the regulatory plan from the castle to the highway that leads to Milan. It was carefully restored in 2002.

== Anthropic geography ==
=== Districts and localities ===
In addition to the main centre, Cassano d'Adda comprises:

- Groppello d'Adda, in the North, towards Vaprio d'Adda and Trezzo sull'Adda.

The other three districts and localities beyond the Adda river, which means in the East of the main centre:

- Cascate, between the Adda river and Highway 11;
- Cascine San Pietro, in the South-East towards Casirate d'Adda;
- Taranta, in the North-East, towards Treviglio.

Groppello d'Adda and Cascine San Pietro are districts, while Cascate and Taranta are localities.

== People ==
Cassano was the birthplace of

- Andrea Bonomi, footballer
- Giuseppina Brambilla, opera singer
- Teresa Brambilla, opera singer
- Emilio De Bono, general, fascist activist
- Corrado Fumagalli, TV presenter
- Valentino Mazzola, footballer, captain of the Grande Torino, dead in the Superga Air Disaster
- Gianni Motta, cyclist
- Giuseppe Perrucchetti, creator of the Alpini elite military corps
