= Konrad von Wallenrode =

24th Grand Master of the Teutonic Knights (1391 to 1393)

- Hochmeister
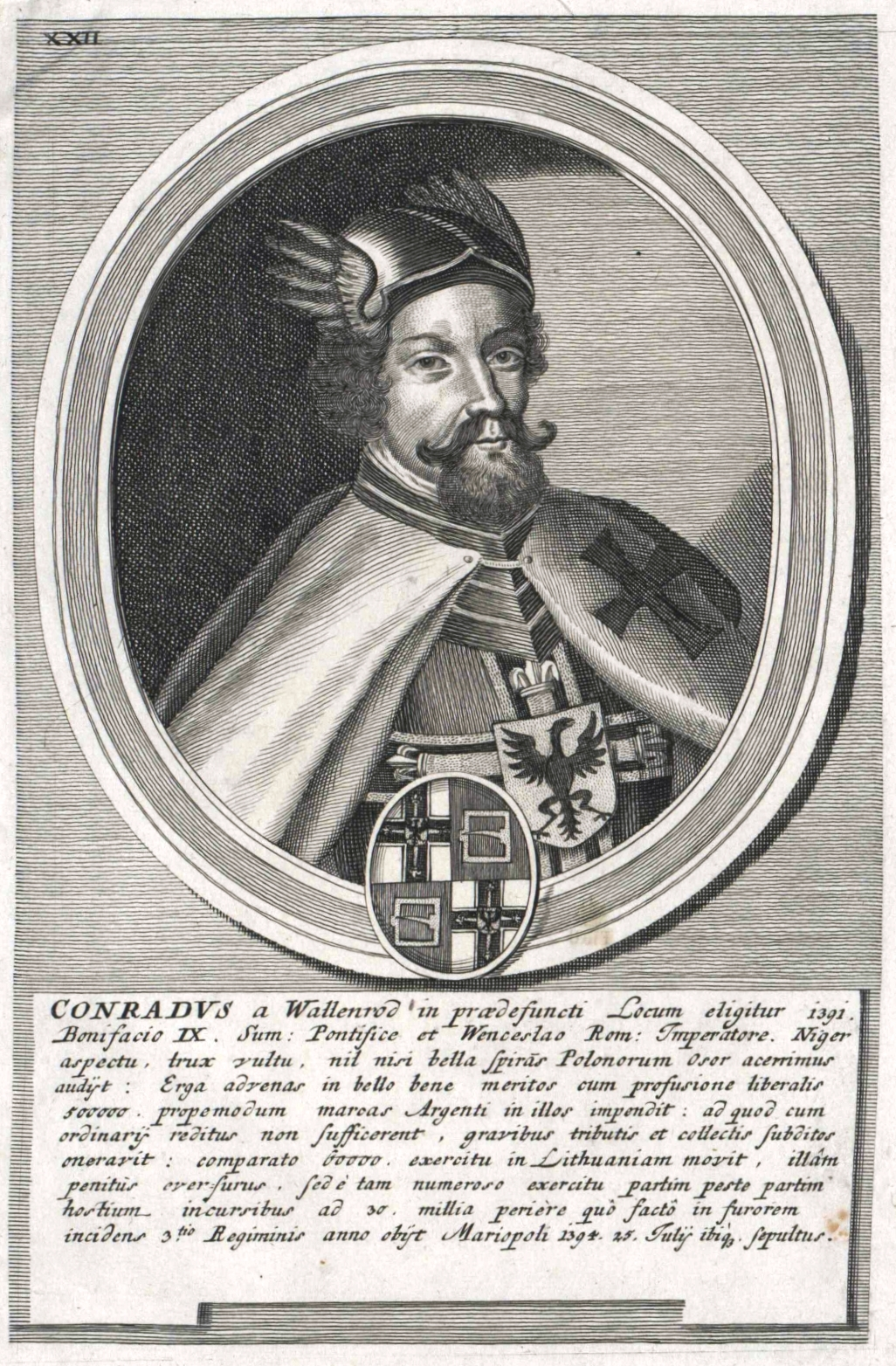

Grand Master of the Teutonic Knights
- Reign: March 12, 1391 - July 23, 1393
- Predecessor: Konrad Zöllner von Rotenstein
- Successor: Konrad von Jungingen
- Born: c. 1330
- Died: July 23, 1393; Marienburg

Konrad von Wallenrode (c. 1330s – 23 July 1393) was the 24th Grand Master of the Teutonic Knights, serving from 1391 to 1393. Modern sources are friendly towards Konrad, although they claim he was hot-blooded, proud, and had tendencies to be cruel.

Konrad was the inspiration for Adam Mickiewicz's poem Konrad Wallenrod.

== Life and career ==
=== Early life ===
Konrad came from a family with a rich knightly tradition that had its roots in Franconia. He joined the Teutonic Order ca. 1370. Grand Master Winrich von Kniprode named him Komtur of Schlochau (Człuchów) in 1377, but his real career did not begin until Conrad Zöllner von Rothenstein became Grand Master in 1382.

After the death of Kuno von Hattenstein, Konrad became Grand Marshal and Komtur of Königsberg. He was chiefly tasked with organizing crusades against the Grand Duchy of Lithuania, and became quite adept at it. He became Komtur of Marienburg (Malbork) and Grosskomtur of the Teutonic Order in 1387. Zöllner died in 1390, and it seemed only a matter of time before Konrad would become the next Grand Master. However, he encountered great opposition from Walrabe von Scharffenberg, Komtur of Danzig (Gdańsk). It was not until 12 March 1391 O.S. that Wallenrode became grand master, thanks to the support of two electors, Siegfried Walpot von Bassenheim and Rüdiger von Elner, the Komturs of Elbing (Elbląg) and Tuchel (Tuchola), respectively.

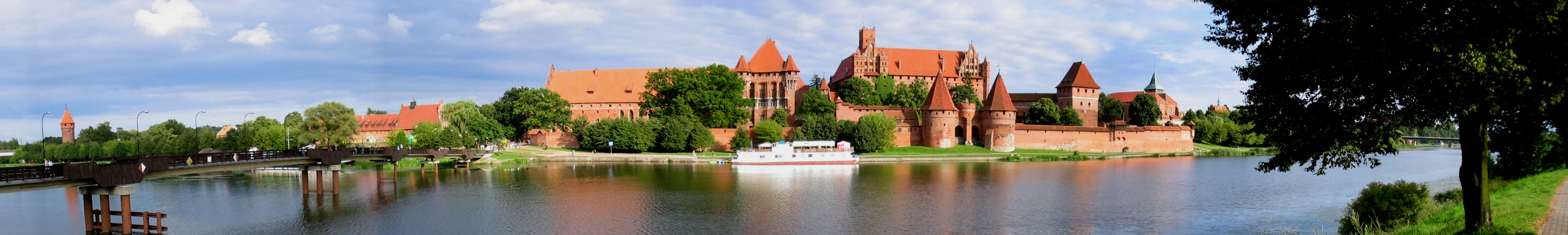
Marienburg (Malbork)

=== As Grand Master ===
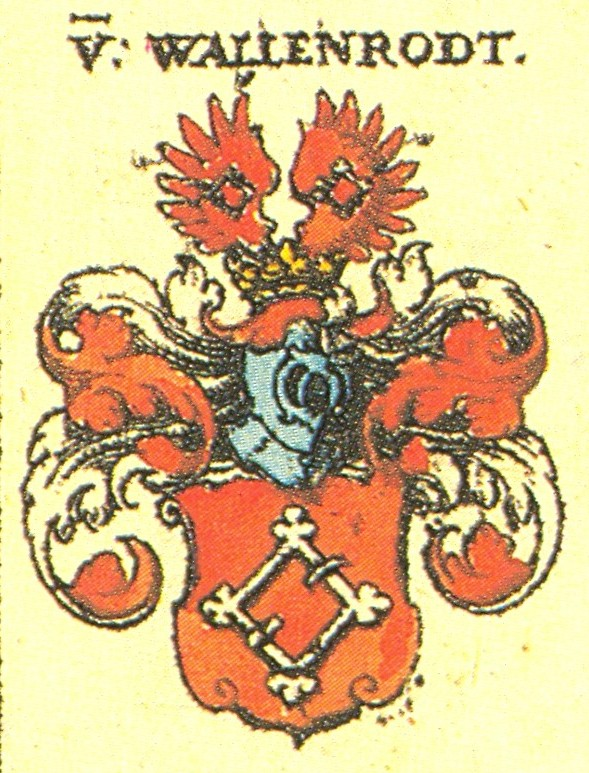
Coat of arms of the family of Wallenrode from Johann Siebmacher 1605

Konrad's two-year rule was filled with campaigns against Lithuania. He was against the Polish-Lithuanian Union, which he tried to dissolve. Konrad began a campaign against Lithuania in 1392 and split his army into three divisions. The first one, under command of Arnold von Burgeln, Komtur of Balga, headed for Masovia. The other two divisions, under the command of Konrad and Grand Marshal Engelhard Rabe von Wildstein, headed for Vilnius. They were close to capturing Vilnius, which was defended by Polish knights, but retreated as a result of a scandal caused by the grand master.

Von Wildstein was a great commander and a tactician with the respect of his soldiers, but he was relieved of his duties as grand marshal by Konrad. The reason is not completely known, but it is widely believed that the grand master was jealous of von Wildstein's success. Nonetheless, this caused a revolt between most of the knights who stood behind von Wildstein. Despite this, Konrad did not change his decision and the campaign was abandoned. This helped von Wallenrode to clean up dissent in the order, especially in the Lower Prussian Komturships of Balga, Brandenburg, and Ragnit that were under supremacy of the grand marshal.

In 1392 Duke Władysław Opolski offered Konrad a partition of Poland with the Holy Roman Empire, the Teutonic Knights, Brandenburg, Hungary, and the Silesian dukes all taking part of it, but the grand master rejected it. The same year he started another military action against Lithuania with guest crusaders, including Henry of Derby, the future King Henry IV of England. Dutch and French knights under Konrad's command attacked Gardinas, leading Vytautas the Great to call a peace conference in Thorn (Toruń). Ten days into the conference, however, Konrad died on 23 July 1393, probably of apoplexy.

During his reign, he led active economic and colonization actions in Prussia. He settled vast tracts of land with German colonists and built two castles, Gotteswerder and Mittenburg. In 1393 he created a new komturship in Rhein (Ryn); its first komtur was his brother Friedrich von Wallenrode, a later Komtur of Mewe (Gniew), Strasburg (Brodnica) and the Grand Marshal of Königsberg who died in the Battle of Grunwald in 1410. Another relative of Konrad was Johann von Wallenrode, the Archbishop of Riga between 1393–1416.

== The poem ==
Adam Mickiewicz took some elements of the historical Konrad von Wallenrode for his 1828 patriotic narrative poem, Konrad Wallenrod, in which Wallenrode is portrayed as a Christianized Lithuanian pagan, who after learning about his roots, deliberately leads the Knights into defeat.

The poem was later twice made into an opera; I Lituani by Italian composer Amilcare Ponchielli in 1874, and Konrad Wallenrod by Polish composer Władysław Żeleński in 1885.

Grand Master of the Teutonic Order
Preceded by Conrad Zöllner von Rothenstein	Hochmeister; 1391–1393	Succeeded by Konrad von Jungingen
