= List of operas by Amilcare Ponchielli =

This is a complete list of operas by Amilcare Ponchielli (1834–1886).

Opus	Title	Genre	Subdivisions	Libretto	Première	Place, Theatre
2	I promessi sposi	melodramma	4 acts	Giuseppe Aglio and Cesare Stradivari after Alessandro Manzoni	30 August 1856; revised: 5 December 1872	Cremona, Teatro Concordia; revised: Milan, Teatro Dal Verme
3	Bertrando dal Bormio		4 acts		composed in 1858, scheduled for Turin but unperformed	
4	La Savoiarda (revised as Lina)	dramma lirico	3 acts	Francesco Guidi	19 January 1861; revised: 17 November 1877	Cremona, Teatro Concordia, revised: Milan, Teatro Dal Verme
	Roderigo re dei Goti		3 acts	Francesco Guidi	26 December 1863	Piacenza, Teatro Municipale
6	Il parlatore eterno	scherzo comico	1 act	Antonio Ghislanzoni	18 October 1873	Lecco, Teatro Sociale
7	I Lituani	dramma lirico	3 acts	Antonio Ghislanzoni	7 March 1874; revised: 6 March 1875	Milan, Teatro alla Scala (both versions)
8	I Mori di Valenza	dramma lirico	4 acts	Antonio Ghislanzoni	begun by the composer in 1874, completed by Annibale Ponchielli and Arturo Cadore; 17 March 1914	Monte Carlo, Opéra
9	La Gioconda	dramma lirico	4 acts	Tobia Gorrio (pseudonym/anagram of Arrigo Boito) after Victor Hugo's drama Angelo, tyran de Padoue (1835)	8 April 1876; revised: 18 October 1876; revised: 27 November 1879	Milan, Teatro alla Scala; revised: Venice, Rossini; revised: Genoa, Politeama Genovese
10	Il figliuol prodigo	melodramma	4 acts	Angelo Zanardini	26 December 1880	Milan, Teatro alla Scala
11	Marion Delorme	melodramma	4 acts	Enrico Golisciani	17 March 1885	Milan, Teatro alla Scala
