= Konrad Wallenrod =

1828 narrative poem by Adam Mickiewicz

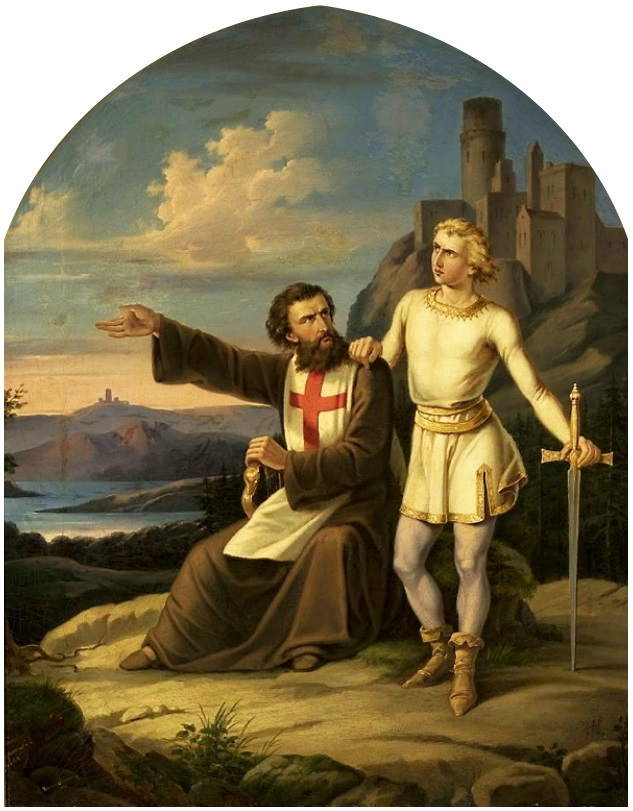
Konrad Wallenrod, a painting by Władysław Majeranowski (1844), National Museum in Warsaw.

Konrad Wallenrod is an 1828 narrative poem, in Polish, by Adam Mickiewicz, set in the 14th-century Grand Duchy of Lithuania.

Mickiewicz wrote it, while living in St. Petersburg, Russia, in protest against the late-18th-century partitions of the Polish–Lithuanian Commonwealth by the Russian Empire, the Kingdom of Prussia, and the Habsburg monarchy.

Mickiewicz had been exiled to St. Petersburg for his participation in the Philomaths organization at Vilnius University.

The poem helped inspire the Polish November 1830 Uprising against Russian rule. Though its subversive theme was apparent to most readers, the poem escaped censorship due to conflicts among the censors and, in the second edition, a prefatory homage to Tsar Nicholas I.

== Plot ==
In a preface, Mickiewicz briefly outlines the history of the region, describing the interactions among the Lithuanians, Prussians, Poles, and Russians. The following six cantos tell the story of Konrad Wallenrod, a fictional Lithuanian pagan captured and reared as a Christian by his people's long-standing enemies, the Order of Teutonic Knights. He rises to the position of Grand Master, but is awakened to his heritage by a mysterious minstrel singing at an entertainment event. He then seeks vengeance by deliberately leading the Knights into a major military defeat. Wallenrod has a wife, Aldona, who has been living in seclusion. Wallenrod secretly meets her. The Knights discover his treason and sentence him to death. Aldona refuses to flee with him, because she had previously sworn allegiance to God. Wallenrod commits suicide by drinking poison.

== Cultural influences ==
The concept of "Wallenrodism" (Polish: Wallenrodyzm)—the striking of a treacherous, possibly suicidal, blow against an enemy—and certain powerful fragments of the poem have become an enduring part of the Polish and Lithuanian psyche and found resonance in the independence struggles of the two nations in the 19th (1831, 1863) and 20th centuries. The poem included a reference to Machiavelli's dictum that a leader must be both a lion and a fox. Its encouragement of what would later be called "patriotic treason" created controversy, since its elements of deception and conspiracy were thought incompatible with Christian and chivalric values. Mickiewicz was taken aback by the strength of the public response to his poem and regretted its publication; before his death, he expressed frustration at his financial inability to buy back and burn every copy of what he described as a mere "political pamphlet."

Konrad Wallenrod has twice been turned into an opera: as I Lituani (The Lithuanians), by Italian composer Amilcare Ponchielli (1874); and as Konrad Wallenrod, by Polish composer Władysław Żeleński (1885). The Polish composer Frédéric Chopin may have based his Ballade No.1 in G minor on this poem.

The Polish author Joseph Conrad, born Józef Teodor Konrad Korzeniowski, may have selected the second part of his pen name as an hommage to the poem's protagonist. Mickiewicz's poem influenced Conrad's frequent explorations of the conflict between publicly attested loyalty and a hidden affiliation with a national cause.

== See also ==
- Romanticism in Poland
- Konrad von Wallenrode
- List of Poles
- 1828 in poetry
- Kordian
