= Aleksander Myszuga =

Ukrainian singer

- Олександр Мишуга
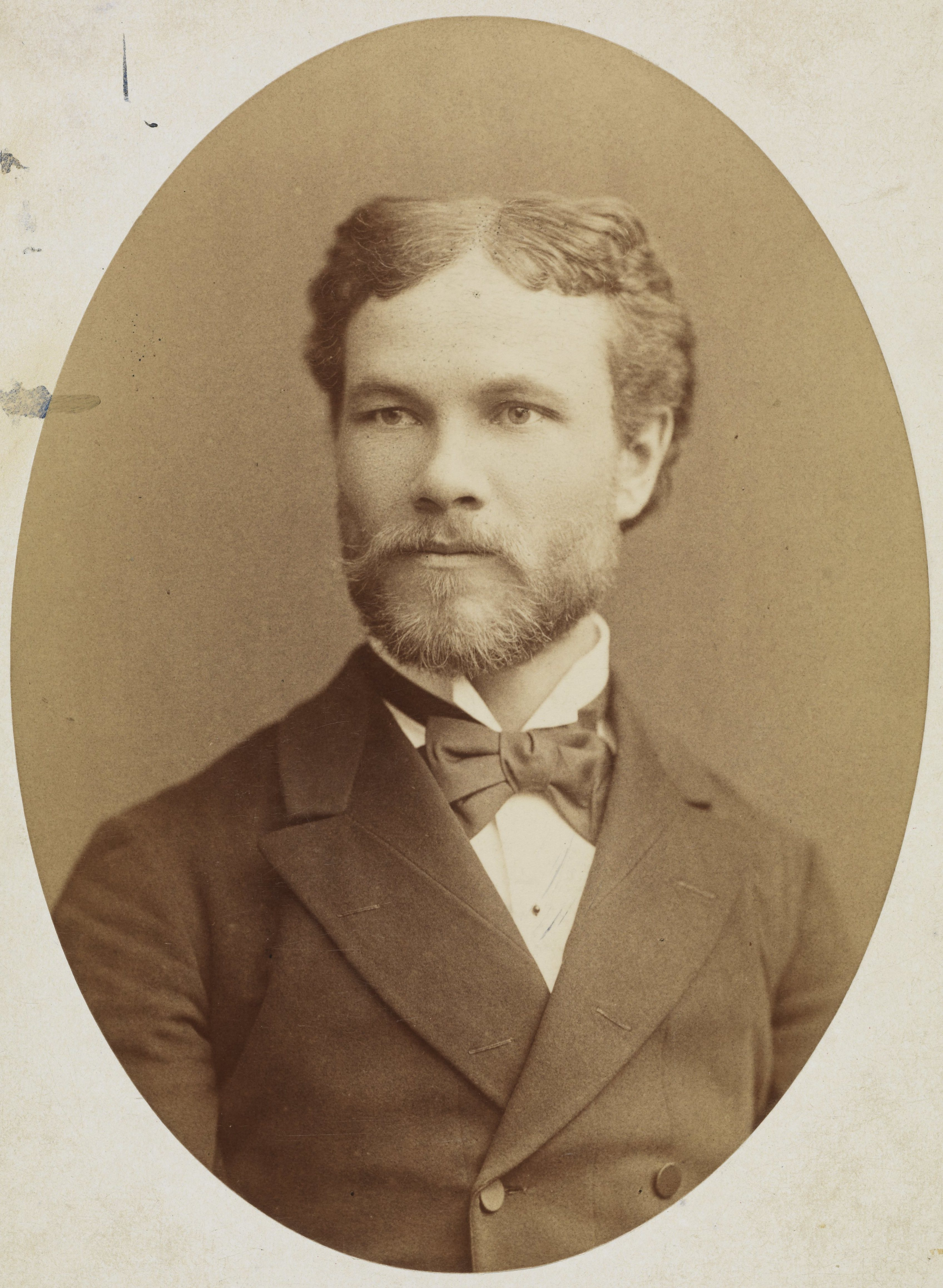
- Myszuga in 1880
- Born: Oleksandr Pylypovych Myshuha; June 20, 1853
- Died: March 9, 1922 (aged 68)

Aleksander Myszuga (Ukrainian: Олександр Пилипович Мишуга, romanized: Oleksandr Pylypovych Myshuha; sometimes spelled Ołeksandr Mishuga or Olexander Myshuga; June 20, 1853 – March 9, 1922) was a Ukrainian, later nationalized Polish, operatic tenor of international fame.

Myzsuga sang at opera houses in Europe, including the Vienna State Opera, the Royal Opera House in London, the Mariinski Theatre in Saint Petersburg, and the Teatro alla Scala in Milan.

Through his career, he amassed a large following of dedicated fans and admirers, most notably Italian composer Ruggero Leoncavallo, who said that Myszuga's voice and art were "magical".

He had a vast repertoire, encompassing most of the major roles of the Italian repertoire (which he always sang in their original language), from bel-canto to verismo. He also sang various roles from the French, Russian, and German repertoires. But most of all, he was renowned as an outstanding interpreter of the works of Polish composer Stanislaw Moniuszko, especially as Jontek in Halka, in which he was considered unsurpassable.

== Early life and career ==
Born in Novyi Vytkiv, a village near Lviv, Ukraine. His father was Filip Myshuha, a local shoemaker. By the age of 15, he was singing in the choir of the St. Jur's Cathedral in Lviv. He first studied to be a teacher, and worked in Lviv as a teacher in a parochial school. During this time, he also took voice lessons from Walery Wysocki, and made his first appearance as a singer on September 13th 1880 at a concert featuring excerpts from Moniuszko's The Haunted Manor. At around 1881, he went to Milan to continue his vocal studies, and later to Paris to study with the renowned vocal pedagogue Giovanni Sbriglia (who also tutored legendary tenor Jean de Reszke). In 1882, he made his operatic debut in Forlì as Lyonel in Flotow's Martha under the name Alexander Filippi (in honor of his father, and which he would use for all his Italian appearances), with performances in Milan, Florence, Turin and Nice soon following. The next year, he was engaged by the Lviv Opera for the whole season and was soon very popular, especially as an excellent Jontek and Faust(Gounod's).

== International stardom ==
In 1885, he made his first appearance in Vienna at the State Opera as Fernando in Donizetti's La Favorite. As per local custom, the opera was given in German and Myszuga was originally required to also sing in German (which he felt uncomfortable doing). In the first performance, however, Myszuga's performance was an unexpected sensation. So much so, that management allowed Myszuga to sing the remaining performances in Italian, per his wishes (an exception which had only been granted previously to the Spanish diva Adelina Patti). Over the course of the next month, Myszuga went on to perform 4 other roles with the company; these being Edgardo in Donizetti's Lucia di Lammermoor, Nemorino in the same composer's L'elisir d'amore, Alfredo in Verdi's La Traviata, and the Duke in the same composer's Rigoletto. His success was such that he was soon invited to sing at London's Royal Opera House, Prague's State Opera, Saint Petersburg's Imperial Mariinski Theatre, and Milan's Teatro alla Scala, among other important European theaters. He also sang in Paris, though not at the famous Opéra, but rather at a smaller company (likely the Opéra-Comique).

He created many roles in the world premieres of several Polish operas, most notably the title role in Żeleński's Janek, which was composed especially for him.

== Later life and death ==
After around 1905, Myszuga devoted most of his time to teaching, and for the next 6 years, he taught a singing class at the Mykola Lysenko Music and Drama School in Kyiv; and from 1911 to 1914, he taught at the Chopin Higher School in Warsaw. He still occasionally performed though, most notably in 1911 when he sang Jontek, his signature role, for the Warsaw Opera's 700th performance of Halka.

In 1914, he travelled to Italy, and was there when World War I broke out, which cost him a sizable amount of his fortune and was a serious blow to Myszuga. After that, he seems to have returned to his native Ukraine, where he gave his last public performance was in a concert in 1921. After that, his health began to fail him, and eventually died in 1922 of cancer.
