= Cadorette =

Cadorette is a surname. Notable people with the surname include:

- Mary Cadorette (born 1957), American actress
- Philippe Cadorette (born 1995), Canadian ice hockey player
- Thérèse Cadorette (1925–2007), Québécois writer and actress

== See also ==
- Cadore (surname)
