= Andrea Gruber =

American dramatic soprano (born 1966)

- Born: 1966 (age 59–60); New York City, New York, U.S.
- Genre: Opera
- Instruments: Vocals

Andrea Gruber (born 1966) is an American dramatic soprano particularly admired for her interpretations of the works of Puccini, Verdi, and Wagner.

== Early life and education ==
Andrea Gruber was born in 1966 in New York City, the daughter of two history professors. She attended the Bank Street School in New York City and the Putney School in Vermont. Later, she studied at the Manhattan School of Music. She won a place in the Metropolitan Opera's Young Artists program in 1989.

== Career ==
In the 1989–1990 season, while still a member of the Met's young artist program, Gruber made her professional debut at the Ravinia Festival in a performance of the Verdi's Requiem with the Chicago Symphony Orchestra conducted by James Levine. This was followed by her first stage appearance at the Metropolitan Opera as the Third Norn in Richard Wagner's Götterdämmerung.

In the 1990–1991 season, Gruber performed her first principal role at the Metropolitan Opera as Amelia in Verdi's Un ballo in maschera. She also made her European debut as Leonore in the Scottish Opera production of La forza del destino.

In the 1991–1992 season, Gruber returned to the Metropolitan Opera to perform the role of Elizabeth in Verdi's Don Carlo as a replacement for an ailing Aprile Millo.

In the 1992–1993 season, Gruber made her Seattle Opera debut in the title role in Verdi's Aida.

In the 1993–1994 season, Gruber sang the title role in Verdi's Aida at the Metropolitan Opera.

In the 1994–1995 season, Gruber sang the role of Elsa in Wagner's Lohengrin with Seattle Opera and the role of Amelia in Verdi's Simon Boccanegra at the Metropolitan Opera.

In the 1995–1996 season, Gruber made her debut at Royal Opera Covent Garden in the title role of Verdi's Aida. She also sang the role of Chrysothemis in Richard Strauss's Elektra with Seattle Opera and Aida at the Metropolitan Opera.

In the 1999–2000 season, Gruber made her debut with the San Francisco Opera as Abigaille in Verdi's Nabucco. She also sang Schoenberg's Gurrelieder with the Philadelphia Orchestra.

In the 2000–2001 season, Gruber sang the role of Odabella in Verdi's Attila in her debut at the Lyric Opera of Chicago. She also sang the role of Tove in Schoenberg's Gurrelieder in the Metropolitan Opera's tour of Japan and in her debut with the Toronto Symphony Orchestra.

In 2001–2002 season, Gruber sang the role of Abigaille in Verdi's Nabucco at the Metropolitan Opera and reprised the role in her debut with Arena di Verona. She also sang both Elisabeth and Venus in Tulsa Opera's production of Wagner's Tannhäuser and the role of Sieglinde in Wagner's Die Walküre in a concert version with the Atlanta Symphony Orchestra.

In the 2002–2003 season, Gruber sang the title role in Puccini's Turandot and the role of Abigaille in Verdi's Nabucco at the Metropolitan Opera. She also made her debut with Opéra National de Paris in the title role of Puccini's Turandot and her debut with Teatro Comunale di Bologna as Amelia in Verdi's Un ballo in maschera.

In the 2003–2004 season, Gruber made her debut at La Scala in the title role of Puccini's Turandot. She also sang the role of Abigaille in Verdi's Nabucco at the Metropolitan Opera, Santuzza in Cavalleria Rusticana with San Francisco Opera, and Minnie in Seattle Opera's production of Puccini's La fanciulla del West.

In the 2004–2005 season, Gruber sang the title role in Puccini's Turandot at the Metropolitan Opera and the title role in Verdi's Aida at the Lyric Opera of Chicago. She also sang Turandot at the Royal OperaHouse, Covent Garden and sung the title role of La Gioconda at the Arena di Verona which was recorded on DVD.

In the 2005–2006 season, Gruber sang the title role in Verdi's Aida at the Metropolitan Opera, the role of Donna Leonora di Vargas in La forza del destino with San Francisco Opera, the role of Lady Macbeth in Verdi's Macbeth with Seattle Opera, the title role of Puccini's Turandot at the Teatro Comunale Giuseppe Verdi and with Opera Japonica, the role of Odabella in Verdi's Attila at Teatro di San Carlo, and the role of Minnie in Covent Garden's production of Puccini's La fanciulla del West. She also performed with the Atlanta Symphony Orchestra at Carnegie Hall.

In the 2006–2007 season, Gruber sang the title role in Puccini's Tosca and the title role in Puccini's Turandot at the Metropolitan Opera. She also sang Turandot at the Lyric Opera of Chicago and Parma's Teatro Regio, Abigaille in Nabucco at the Arena di Verona and at Teatro dell'Opera di Roma, and gave a recital at the Morgan Library for the George London Foundation.

Gruber has also sung lead roles at the Vienna Staatsoper, the Bayerische Staatsoper in Munich, the Staatsoper Unter den Linden, the Liceu, Deutsche Oper Berlin, Teatro Regio Torino, and Houston Grand Opera among others.

Gruber's orchestral repertoire includes most of the major works for dramatic soprano including Beethoven's Ninth Symphony and Missa Solemnis, Verdi's Requiem, Britten's War Requiem, Strauss's Four Last Songs, and Schoenberg's Gurre-Lieder among others. Her orchestral appearances include performances with the Los Angeles Philharmonic, the Houston Symphony, the London Symphony Orchestra, and San Francisco Symphony among others.

Gruber has sung under such notable conductors as André Previn, Roberto Abbado, and Donald Runnicles among others.

== Opera roles ==
- Abigaille, Nabucco (Verdi)
- Aïda, Aïda (Verdi)
- Amelia, Un ballo in maschera (Verdi)
- Chrysothemis, Elektra (Richard Strauss)
- Elisabeth, Tannhäuser (Wagner)
- Elisabetta, Don Carlos (Verdi)
- Elsa, Lohengrin (Wagner)
- Gioconda, La Gioconda (Ponchielli)
- Lady Macbeth, Macbeth (Verdi)
- Leonora, La forza del destino (Verdi)

- Maria/Amelia, Simon Boccanegra (Verdi)
- Minnie, La fanciulla del West (Puccini)
- Odabella, Attila (Verdi)
- Santuzza, Cavalleria rusticana (Mascagni)
- Sieglinde, Die Walküre (Wagner)
- Tosca, Tosca (Puccini)
- Turandot, Turandot (Puccini)
- Third Norn, Götterdämmerung (Wagner)
- Venus, Tannhäuser (Wagner)

== Personal life ==
In a 2005 interview, Gruber spoke publicly about her addictions to painkillers and prescription drugs, where she admitted that her problems with drugs began at age 11. The addiction later extended to other drugs such as oxycodone. In 1995, her drug problems had developed to the point that she gave a "disastrous" performance at the Met in Aïda, where she recalled that she could not hit a note at one point during the performance. The Met bought out her contract and dismissed her from the company. She sang in a few engagements at the Seattle Opera and at the Vienna State Opera in the 1990s, but was later asked not to return either to Vienna or the Salzburg Festival. She subsequently began rehabilitation at the Hazelden clinic in Minnesota over a period of 1.5 years. In 1999, after performances in San Francisco, the Met re-engaged her for performances of Nabucco in 2001 and Turandot in 2002.

== Discography ==
- Third Norn in Richard Wagner's Götterdämmerung with James Levine and the Metropolitan Opera, Deutsche Grammophon label, 1991.
- Gioconda in Ponchielli's La Gioconda with Donato Renzetti and the Arena di Verona, Dynamic label, 2005.
- Nabucco - Verdi (Piacenza) ARTHAUS (Andrea Gruber - Ambrogio Maestri - Paata Burchuladze)
