= Cadore (surname) =

Cadore is an Italian surname. Notable people with the surname include:

- Arturo Cadore (1877–1977), Italian musician
- Judith Martin Cadore (born 1957), American physician
- Leon Cadore (1891–1958), American baseball player

== See also ==
- Bruno Cadoré (born 1954), French Catholic priest
- Da Cadore, an alternative name for the artist Titian
