= Konrad Wallenrod (opera) =

Konrad Wallenrod is a Polish-language opera by Władysław Żeleński to a libretto by Zygmunt Sarnecki (1837-1922) and Władysław Noskowski (1841-1881) based on the epic poem Konrad Wallenrod (1828) by Adam Mickiewicz. The premiere was 1885 in Lviv, which was not prepared technically to create a grand opera on this scale. Notably at the premiere the elaborate harp part was played on the piano by Paderewski. A further staging in Krakow was not followed by a planned staging in Warsaw, which was stalled partly due to the Tsarist censor's concerns with the subject. Konrad Wallenrod was not performed in Warsaw till the 1930s.

== Plot ==
The plot follows closely the poem Konrad Wallenrod with Wallenrod and his wife Aldona sacrificing themselves in the final act and the triumph of the Teutonic knights.

== Cast ==
- Alf, later performing under the assumed name of Konrad Wallenrod, a tenor
- Aldona, his wife, soprano
- Halban, priest of Perkūnas Baltic god of thunder, bass
- head knight commander, baritone
- Witold minstrel baritone
- Orlandi minstrel soprano
- Clavigo minstrel mezzo-soprano
- First Crusader bass
- Second Crusader baritone
- Knight first tenor
- Knight second bass
- Knight third baritone
- Knight fourth baritone
- Monk, non speaking role
- Lithuanians, Lithuanians, pages, bards, Teutonic Knights, knights, priests, peasants, peasant women and children

== Recording ==
- Halban's aria Alfred Orda (baritone)
