= Maddalena Mariani Masi =

Italian opera singer (1850–1916)

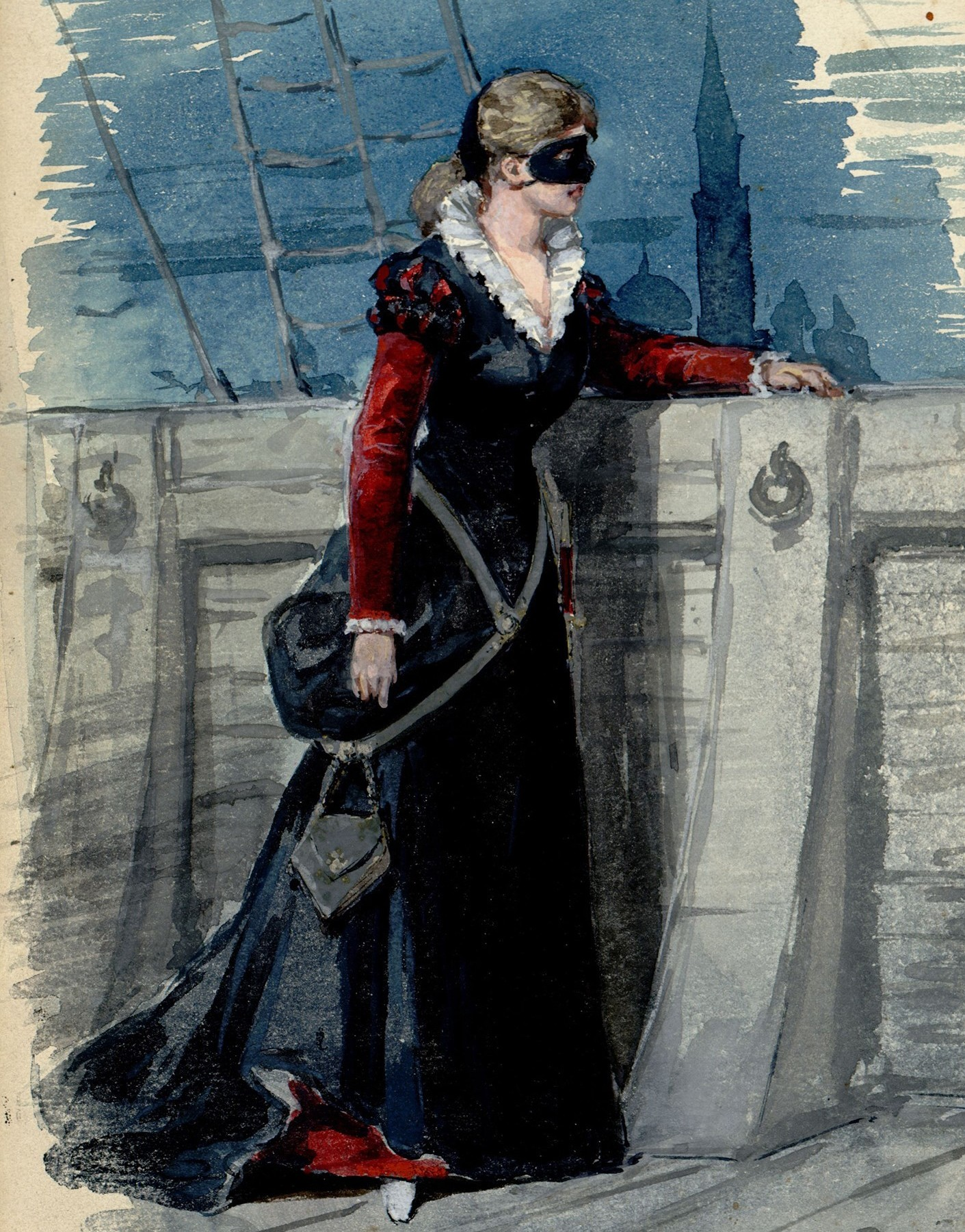
- Costume design for La Gioconda in 1876
- Born: 1850; Florence, Italy
- Died: 25 September 1916 (aged 65–66); Erba, Lombardy, Italy
- Occupations: Operatic soprano; Voice teacher
- Organizations: La Scala

Maddalena Mariani Masi (1850 – 25 September 1916), sometimes written Maddalena Mariani-Masi, was an Italian soprano and voice teacher. She created the title role of Ponchielli's La Gioconda in 1876 at La Scala in Milan, and appeared in the role at several Italian theatres and the Liceu in Barcelona. She also frequently appeared as Marguerite in Boito's Mefistofele.

== Life ==
Born Maddalena Mariani in Florence, she studied the piano at the conservatory in her home town. She studied voice there and further in Vienna. She made her stage debut at the Teatro Rossini in Pesaro in 1871. The following year, she appeared at La Scala in Milan, first as Agathe in Weber's Der Freischütz. In 1874, she performed there the role of Juliette in Gounod's Roméo et Juliette. She created the role of Romilda in Filippo Marchetti's Gustavo Wasa in 1875, and Aldona in a new version of Ponchielli's I Lituani. She created the title role in the world premiere of Ponchielli's La Gioconda there in 1876, singing the role also in the final version in 1880. She performed the role at several Italian opera houses, and in 1883 at the Liceu in Barcelona.

Mariani Masi was admired in dramatic soprano roles, both as singer and actor. She appeared as both Marguerite and Elena in Boito's Mefistofele when the revised version premiered at the Teatro Comunale di Bologna, and contributed to the success of the work which had failed at the premiere.

She was beloved by her fans: in 1875, when, during a performance in Buenos Aires, she lost her voice and was unable to perform the mad scene in Lucia di Lammermoor, many of the box-holders met her in her dressing room to offer their condolences.

She retired from opera in about 1890, working as a singing teacher thereafter; her pupils included Lina Cavalieri.

Mariani Masi died in Erba, Lombardy.
