= La Gioconda (opera) =

Dramma lirico in four acts by Amilcare Ponchielli

- Opera by Amilcare Ponchielli
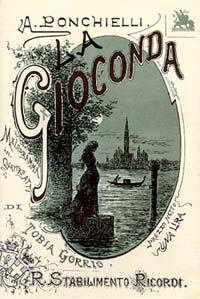
- Cover of the original 1876 libretto
- Librettist: Arrigo Boito
- Language: Italian
- Based on: Angelo, Tyrant of Padua by Victor Hugo
- Premiere: 8 April 1876; Teatro alla Scala, Milan

La Gioconda is an opera in four acts by Amilcare Ponchielli set to an Italian libretto by Arrigo Boito (as Tobia Gorrio), based on Angelo, Tyrant of Padua, a 1835 play in prose by Victor Hugo (the same source Gaetano Rossi had used for his libretto for Mercadante's Il giuramento in 1837).

First performed in 1876, La Gioconda was a major success for Ponchielli, as well as the most successful new Italian opera between Verdi's Aida (1871) and Otello (1887). It is also a famous example of the Italian genre of Grande opera, the equivalent of French Grand-Opéra.

Ponchielli revised the work three times; the fourth and final version was first performed in 1879 in Genoa before reaching Milan in 1880 where its reputation as the definitive version was established. There are several complete recordings of the opera, and it is regularly performed, especially in Italy. It is one of only a few operas that features a principal role for each of the six major voice types. The opera also includes the famous ballet Dance of the Hours, often performed separately or in parody.

== Composition and performance history ==
La Gioconda is part of the standard opera repertoire in Italy and is regularly staged at opera houses in that nation. Given the large number of personnel and elaborate sets the opera requires, the work is one of the more expensive operas to produce, and as a result, the opera is more frequently performed at opera houses with larger budgets like the Teatro alla Scala in Milan and the Metropolitan Opera in New York City. The expense of producing the opera has made it less frequently staged outside of Italy, but it is still part of the Western canon of opera literature on the international stage.

=== Initial stagings and revisions in Italy ===
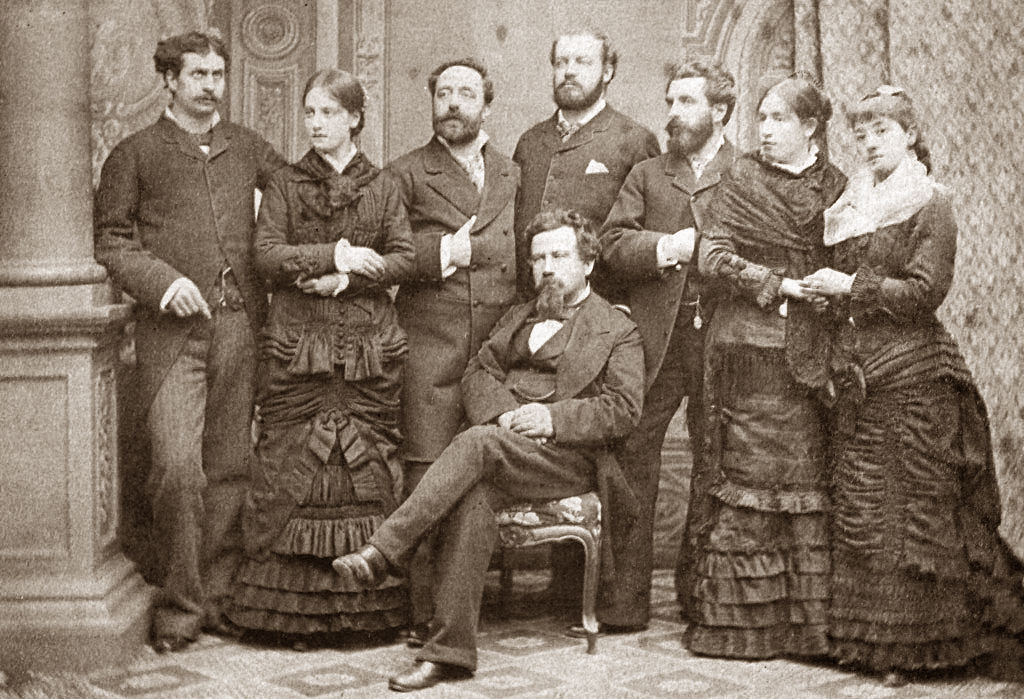
Cast of the fourth version premiere at the Politeama Genovese, 1879. Left to right: Francesco Marconi, Flora Mariani De Angelis, Gialdino Gialdini, Edouard De Reszke, Gustavo Moriami, Maddalena Mariani Masi, Giuditta Celega. Amilcare Ponchielli seated center.

La Gioconda was commissioned in 1874 by Giulio Ricordi of the music publishing firm Casa Ricordi. Ricordi selected Arrigo Boito to write the libretto for the opera; although he used an anagram of his own name, 'Tobia Gorrio'. Boito modeled his construction after the grand opera style of French dramatist Eugène Scribe; employing a historical framework with a wide array of characters that could provide a visual spectacle on stage and opportunities for contrast. In the French grand opera tradition the work contains a central ballet and massed choral scenes.

La Gioconda was first performed at the Teatro alla Scala, Milan, on 8 April 1876 with Italian soprano Maddalena Mariani Masi in the title role and Spanish tenor Julián Gayarre as Enzo. The work was positively received at its premiere with Milan's leading music critic, Filippo Filippi of the magazine La perseveranza, declaring that, apart from Giuseppe Verdi, only Ponchielli could produce an opera of such importance among Italy's then living composers. Ponchielli's wife, soprano Teresina Brambilla, also performed the role of La Gioconda in later performances of the opera at La Scala in 1876, and became a famous interpreter of the role.

After the premiere, Ponchielli continued to modify the work several times for succeeding productions. For the opera's first staging in Venice at the Teatro Rossini on 18 October 1876 numerous changes were made; including the addition of the 'Furlana' in Act 1; a new cabaletta (‘O grido di quest’anima’) for the duet between Enzo and Barnaba; a preghiera for Laura in Act 2; and a new aria for Alvise in Act 3 which was later discarded in subsequent stagings but whose lyrics were repurposed in part in later revisions within Iago's Credo. The opera was modified again for its first staging in Rome at the Teatro Apollo on 23 January 1877. For this production Ponchielli wrote a new finale to Act 1 which replaced a reprise of the 'Furlana', and replaced the naval battle at the end of Act 2 with a duet for Enzo and Gioconda .

The fourth and final version of the opera premiered in Genoa on 27 November 1879 without much fanfare. However, this version later achieved critical acclaim and the status as the definitive version of the opera when it was staged at La Scala in Milan the following year on 28 March 1880. For this version, Ponchielli re-composed Alvise's aria, "Si! Morir ella de'!", and replaced the original stretta in the finale of Act 3 with an orchestral peroration of the principal theme of the preceding pezzo concertato. This construction was novel at the time, and later influenced other opera composers like Ponchielli's pupil Giacomo Puccini.

=== International performances in Europe and South America ===
After premiering the work in 1876, La Scala has performed La Gioconda several times in its history; most notably a revival staged by Nicola Alexandrovich Benois with a cast starring Maria Callas and Giuseppe di Stefano in the 1950s. Callas had tackled the role of La Gioconda previously; singing the role for her professional opera debut at the Arena di Verona on August 2, 1947. Benois's production remained in La Scala's repertoire through 1997; although with different performers. La Scala was also responsible for the first complete recording of the opera made in 1931 with Giannina Arangi-Lombardi in the title role. In 2022 La Scala premiered a new staging of the opera by director Davide Livermore with a cast led by sopranos Saioa Hernández and Irina Churilova who alternated in the title role.

The United Kingdom premiere of La Gioconda was given at the Royal Opera House, Covent Garden on 31 May 1883 with American soprano Maria Durand (b. 1846) in the title role. The Spanish premiere of the opera was given in Barcelona in 1886. This was followed by performances in 1887 in Brussels, Vienna, and Warsaw.

The celebrated tenor Enrico Caruso had the first major critical success of his career in the role of Enzo when he performed the part at the Teatro Massimo in Palermo in 1897.

The Italian soprano Tina Poli Randaccio was a lauded performer in the role of La Gioconda during the first half of 20th century on the international stage. She first performed the role in Europe at the Teatro Massimo Vittorio Emanuele in Palermo in 1907; after having already sung La Gioconda on a South American tour in 1904-1905 at the Theatro Municipal (São Paulo) and the Theatro Municipal (Rio de Janeiro). She went on to portray the role at several other theatres, including La Fenice (1908), the Teatro Real (1910), the Teatro Regio di Parma (1911), the Teatro Carlo Felice (1911), the Costanzi Theatre in Rome (1915), the Municipal Theatre of Santiago (1915), the Teatro Colón in Buenos Aires (1915), the Teatro di San Carlo in Naples (1915), the Teatro Dal Verme in Milan (1917), the Gran Teatro de La Habana in Cuba (1918), the Teatro Comunale di Bologna (1919), the Teatro Comunale Modena (1927), the Teatro Lirico in Milan (1929), and the Teatro Politeama Garibaldi in Palermo (1931) among others. She also performed the role of La Gioconda for radio broadcasts of the opera with orchestras in Rome and Turin in 1931.

In 1909 the opera was staged at the Teatro dell'Opera in Rome with an excellent cast composed by Angelo Masini Pieralli, Giannina Russ, Luisa Garibaldi and Titta Ruffo.

In 2017 the opera was staged for the first time in the Czech Republic at the National Theatre Brno, Janáček Theatre with Csilla Boross in the title role. In 2022 Joseph Calleja portrayed Enzo and Amanda Echalaz portrayed La Gioconda at the Grange Park Opera.

=== Performances in the United States ===
The opera had its American premiere at the Metropolitan Opera (the "Met") during the first season of that opera company on 20 December 1883 with Swedish soprano Christine Nilsson in the title role, Italian tenor Roberto Stagno as Enzo, French soprano Emmy Fursch-Madi as Laura, and Italian contralto Sofia Scalchi as La Cieca. The same cast was employed for further performances of the opera in Chicago and Saint Louis in 1884. The next staging of the opera in New York took place a decade later at the Grand Opera House in 1893 with American soprano Selma Kronold in the title role. The opera was staged on Broadway at the American Theatre by the Castle Square Opera Company in 1899 with Yvonne de Tréville in the title role. Soprano Lillian Nordica performed the title role with Oscar Hammerstein I's Manhattan Opera Company in 1907.

The Met mounted the opera for the second time twenty-one years after its first staging in 1904 with Nilsson reprising the title role, Enrico Caruso as Enzo, Arturo Vigna conducting, and the French baritone Eugène Dufriche serving both as the production's director and in the supporting role of the singer. This production remained in the annual repertoire of the Met through the 1914–1915 season in which Caruso was still performing the role of Enzo, but with Emmy Destinn in the title role. The Met returned to the opera a third time in 1924 with a new production using choreography by Rosina Galli, sets by the Milanese designer Antonio Rovescalli, and a staging by director Désiré Defrère. The premiere cast of this new staging included Florence Easton as Gioconda and Beniamino Gigli as Enzo. However, Rosa Ponselle later assumed the role of Gioconda later in 1924. This production remained part of the Met's regularly programmed repertoire through 1940 with a rotating cast of performers. After a five-year absence from the Met, the Defrère staging of La Gioconda was once again seen in 1945, this time with Stella Roman in the title part and Richard Tucker making his first appearance at the Met in the role of Enzo. A 1946 live performance at the Metropolitan Opera House starring Zinka Milanov as Gioconda, Risë Stevens as Laura, Tucker as Enzo, and Margaret Harshaw as La Cieca was recorded for radio broadcast and later released on disc.

The Defrère staging of the opera continued to be performed at the Met with some frequency until it was replaced with a new production in 1966 that was staged by Margarete Wallmann with sets and costumes by Beni Montresor. The Met took this production on a United States tour in 1967 with Renata Tebaldi in the title role, Franco Corelli as Enzo, Rosalind Elias as Laura, and Fausto Cleva conducting. The Wallmann and Montresor production remained in the Met's repertory for 17 years and was last presented by the company in the 1982–1983 season with Plácido Domingo as Enzo and Eva Marton in the title role. After 1983, La Gioconda has been mounted with less frequency on the Met stage with performances of the work consisting of a 1990 production with Ghena Dimitrova; a 2006 production with Violeta Urmana; and most recently a 2008 production with Deborah Voigt as the title heroines respectively. Additionally, the Opera Orchestra of New York has presented concert versions of the opera several times; including a 1986 concert starring Ghena Dimitrova as Gioconda; and a 2004 concert starring Aprile Millo in the title role and Marcello Giordani as Enzo.

Outside of New York, La Gioconda was performed for the grand opening of the Boston Opera House on November 8, 1909, with Lillian Nordica in the title role, Florencio Constantino as Enzo, and Louise Homer as La Cieca. The San Francisco Opera (SFO) staged the work for the first time in 1947 with Stella Roman and Regina Resnik alternating in the title role. The SFO subsequently staged the opera in 1967 with Leyla Gencer as Gioconda and Grace Bumbry as Laura, and in 1979 the SFO staged the opera a third time with an all-star cast including Renata Scotto as Gioconda and Luciano Pavarotti as Enzo; a production which was filmed for national television broadcast on PBS and which aired internationally through satellite technology at a time when that was rare. Subsequently the SFO has staged La Gioconda in 1983 with Montserrat Caballé; and in 1988 with Eva Marton.

In 1913 the Chicago Grand Opera Company staged the work with Carolina White in the title role. Emmy Destinn performed the title role in La Gioconda for the opening of the 1915 opera season at the Chicago Auditorium. The Chicago Civic Opera opened its 1924-1925 season with a production of La Gioconda starring Rosa Raisa as the ballad singer under the baton of Giorgio Polacco. The Lyric Opera of Chicago staged La Gioconda for the first time in 1957 with Eileen Farrell in the title role. Subsequent performances in Chicago included a 1966 production with Elena Souliotis; a 1986 production with Ghena Dimitrova; and a 1998 production with Jane Eaglen. In 1974 the opera was staged by the New Jersey State Opera with Grace Bumbry in the title role with performances given at Newark Symphony Hall and the Trenton War Memorial.

== Instrumentation ==
The opera is scored for piccolo, two flutes, two oboes, two clarinets, two bassoons, four horns, two cornets, two trumpets, three trombones, tuba, timpani, triangle, bass drum, glockenspiel, two harps, and strings.

== Roles ==
Role	Voice type	Premiere cast, 8 April 1876 (Conductor: Franco Faccio)	Fourth version, 27 November 1879, Politeama Genovese (Conductor: Gialdino Gialdini)
Gioconda, a singer	soprano	Maddalena Mariani Masi	Maddalena Mariani Masi
Laura Adorno, a Genoese lady	mezzo-soprano	Marietta Biancolini Rodriguez	Flora Mariani De Angelis
La Cieca, Gioconda's mother	contralto	Eufemia Barlani Dini	Giuditta Celega
Enzo Grimaldo, a Genoese prince, disguised as a Dalmatian seaman	tenor	Julián Gayarre	Francesco Marconi
Barnaba, spy of the Inquisition	baritone	Gottardo Aldighieri	Gustavo Moriami
Alvise Badoero, one of the leaders of the Inquisition, Laura's husband	bass	Ormondo Maini	Édouard De Reszke
Zuàne, a boatman competing in the regatta	bass	Giovanni Battista Cornago	Giacomo Origo
Isèpo, a scribe	tenor	Amedeo Grazzi	Emanuele Dall'Aglio
A singer	bass	Giovanni Battista Cornago	Giacomo Origo
A pilot	bass	Giovanni Battista Cornago	Giovanni Battista Panari
Chorus: Workers, senators, priests, nobles, sailors, children

== Synopsis ==
The opera's title translates as The Happy Woman, but is usually given in English as The Ballad Singer. However, as this fails to convey the irony inherent in the original, the Italian is usually used. Each act of La Gioconda has a title.

Place: Venice
Time: 17th century

The story revolves around a woman, Gioconda, who so loves her mother that when Laura, her rival in love for the heart of Enzo, saves her mother's life, Gioconda puts aside her own romantic love to repay her. The villain Barnaba tries to seduce Gioconda, but she prefers death.

=== Act 1 The Lion's Mouth ===
The courtyard of the Doge's Palace

During Carnival celebrations before Lent, while everyone else is preoccupied with a regatta, Barnaba, a state spy, lustfully watches La Gioconda as she leads her blind mother, La Cieca, across the Square. When his amorous advances are firmly rejected, he exacts his revenge by denouncing the old lady as a witch whose evil powers influenced the outcome of the gondola race. It is only the intervention of a young sea captain that keeps the angry mob at bay.

Calm is restored at the approach of Alvise Badoero, a member of the Venetian Inquisition, and his wife, Laura. Laura places La Cieca under her personal protection, and in gratitude the old woman presents her with her most treasured possession, a rosary. The sharp-eyed Barnaba notices furtive behaviour between Laura and the sea captain indicating a secret relationship. Recalling that Laura was engaged to the now banished nobleman Enzo Grimaldo before her forced marriage to Alvise, Barnaba realises that the sea captain is Enzo in disguise.

Barnaba confronts Enzo, who admits his purpose in returning to Venice is to take Laura and begin a new life elsewhere. Barnaba knows that Gioconda is also infatuated with Enzo and he sees an opportunity to improve his chances with her by assisting Enzo with his plan of elopement.

When Enzo has gone, Barnaba dictates a letter to be sent to Alvise, revealing his wife's infidelity and the lovers' plan of escape. He is unaware that he has been overheard by Gioconda. The act ends with Barnaba dropping the letter into the Lion's Mouth, where all secret information for the Inquisition is posted, while Gioconda laments Enzo's perceived treachery, and the crowd returns to its festivities.

=== Act 2 The Rosary ===
The deck of Enzo's ship

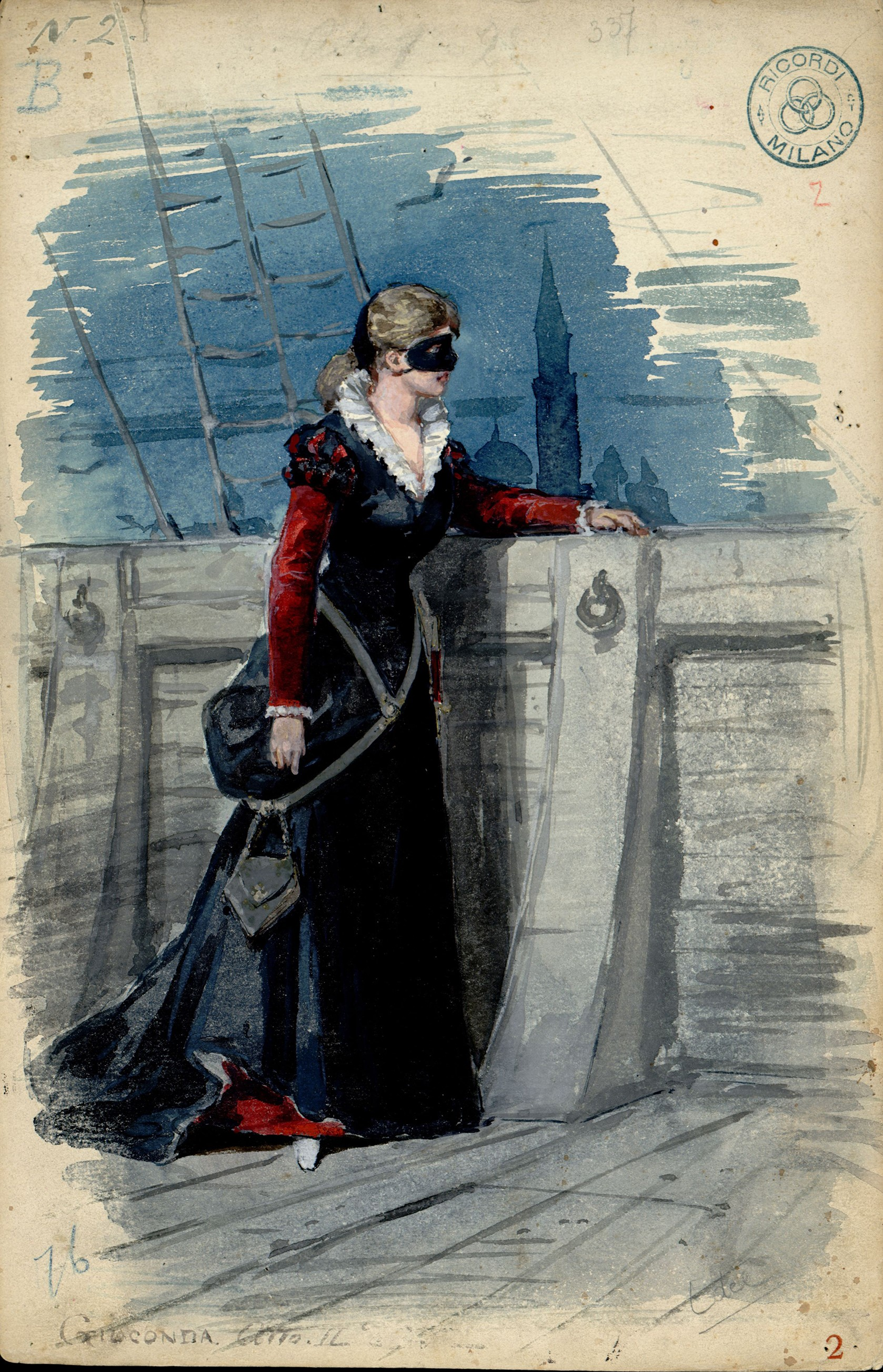
Gioconda's Act II costume (from the original 1876 production) by Alfredo Edel.

Enzo waits for Barnaba to row Laura out from the city to his vessel. Their joyful reunion is overshadowed by Laura's fears as she does not trust Barnaba. Gradually Enzo is able to reassure her, and he leaves her on deck while he goes to prepare for their departure.

La Gioconda has been following Laura with the intention of exacting revenge from her rival. Alvise and his armed men are also in hot pursuit, but as Gioconda is about to stab Laura she sees her mother's rosary hanging round her neck and, realizing that it was Laura who saved her mother, has an instant change of heart. She hurries Laura into her boat so that she can evade her pursuers.

Enzo returns to the deck to find that Laura has fled leaving Gioconda triumphant. Furthermore, Alvise's men are rapidly approaching. Enzo sets fire to the ship rather than let it fall into the hands of his enemies before diving into the lagoon.

=== Act 3 The Ca' d'Oro (House of Gold) ===
Alvise's palace

Laura has been captured, and her vengeful husband insists she must die by poisoning herself (effectively committing suicide and condemning herself to Hell). Once again Gioconda has followed and has found her way into the palace, this time with the intention of saving her rival. Finding Laura alone Gioconda replaces the phial of poison with a powerful drug which creates the appearance of death. The second scene begins with Alvise welcoming his fellow members of the nobility to the palace; Barnaba and Enzo are amongst those present. Lavish entertainment is provided and the act ends with the famous ballet Dance of the Hours. The mood of revelry is shattered as a funeral bell begins to toll and the body of Laura is revealed awaiting burial. A distraught Enzo flings off his disguise and is promptly seized by Alvise's men.

=== Act 4 The Orfano Canal ===
A crumbling ruin on the island of Giudecca

In exchange for Enzo's release from prison, La Gioconda has agreed to give herself to Barnaba. When Enzo is brought in, he is initially furious when Gioconda reveals that she has had Laura's body brought from its tomb. He is about to stab her when Laura's voice is heard and Gioconda's part in reuniting the lovers becomes clear. Enzo and Laura make their escape, leaving La Gioconda to face the horrors awaiting her with Barnaba. The gondoliers' voices are heard in the distance telling that there are corpses floating in the city. When Gioconda tries to leave, she is caught by Barnaba. She then pretends to welcome his arrival, but under cover of decking herself in her jewellery, seizes a dagger and stabs herself to death. In frustrated rage Barnaba tries to perpetrate one last act of evil, screaming at the lifeless body "Last night your mother offended me. I drowned her!"

==== Famous arias and excerpts ====
- "Voce di donna o d'angelo" (La Cieca)
- "O monumento" (Barnaba)
- "Cielo e mar" (Enzo)
- "Stella del Marinar" (Laura)
- "E un anatema!... L'amo come il fulgor creato" (duet Gioconda with Laura)
- "Si! Morir ella de!" (Alvise)
- O madre mia nell'isola fatale (Gioconda)
- Dance of the Hours
- "Suicidio!" (Gioconda)
- "Ora posso morir... Vo' farmi più gaia" (final duet Gioconda with Barnaba)

== The Dance of the Hours ==
The ballet "Dance of the Hours" (Italian: Danza delle ore) from Act III of the opera became an international hit in the concert repertoire after it was performed at the Paris Exhibition of 1878. Budden asserts that although "a mere divertissement at Alvise's palace with no relevance to the action", it is "the only Italian ballet score which will bear transplantation to the concert hall, simply because it alone forms a completely rounded musical statement". It has remained a frequently programmed selection from the opera in orchestral and ballet concerts internationally. The music was used in the 1940 Walt Disney animated film Fantasia in a segment consisting of the whole ballet, but performed comically by animals. The dancers of the morning are represented by Madame Upanova and her ostriches, the daytime by Hyacinth Hippo and her hippopotamus servants (for this section the piece is expanded by a modified and reorchestrated repetition of the "morning" music.) The dancers of the evening are represented by Elephanchine and her bubble blowing elephant troupe, and the night by Ben Ali Gator and his troop of alligators. All of the dancers rejoice in the great hall for a grand finale, which is so extravagant that the entire palace collapses at the end.

Another famous parody of Dance of the Hours is Allan Sherman's song "Hello Muddah, Hello Fadduh", describing a miserable time at summer camp. It uses a theme from a moderato section of the Danza delle ore del giorno as its melody. Sherman's song was later referenced in a 1985 television commercial.

Portions of the ballet were also used by Spike Jones and his City Slickers in their song parodying the Indianapolis 500.

== Recordings ==
=== Audio ===
- 1931: Giannina Arangi-Lombardi, Alessandro Granda, Gaetano Viviani, Ebe Stignani, Corrado Zambelli – Coro e Orchestra del Teatro alla Scala, Lorenzo Molajoli – (Columbia, Naxos)
- 1952: Maria Callas, Gianni Poggi, Paolo Silveri, Fedora Barbieri, Giulio Neri – Coro e Orchestra della RAI Torino, Antonino Votto – (Cetra, Naxos)
- 1957: Zinka Milanov, Giuseppe Di Stefano, Leonard Warren, Rosalind Elias, Plinio Clabassi, Belen Amparan – Coro e Orchestra de l'Accademia di Santa Cecilia, Fernando Previtali – (RCA Victor, later Decca/London)
- 1957: Anita Cerquetti, Mario Del Monaco, Ettore Bastianini, Giulietta Simionato, Cesare Siepi – Coro e Orchestra della Maggio Musicale Fiorentino, Gianandrea Gavazzeni – (Decca)
- 1959: Maria Callas, Pier Miranda Ferraro, Piero Cappuccilli, Fiorenza Cossotto, Ivo Vinco – Coro e Orchestra del Teatro alla Scala, Antonino Votto – (EMI)
- 1964: Mary Curtis-Verna, Franco Corelli, Cesare Bardelli, Mignon Dunn, Bonaldo Giaiotti. – Chorus and Orchestra of Philadelphia Lyric Opera, Anthony Guadango – (Bel Canto Society)
- 1967: Renata Tebaldi, Carlo Bergonzi, Robert Merrill, Marilyn Horne, Nicola Ghiuselev – Coro e Orchestra dell'Accademia di Santa Cecilia, Lamberto Gardelli – (Decca)
- 1980: Montserrat Caballé, Luciano Pavarotti, Sherrill Milnes, Agnes Baltsa, Nicolai Ghiaurov – London Opera Chorus, National Philharmonic Orchestra, Bruno Bartoletti – (Decca)
- 1986: Éva Marton, Giorgio Lamberti, Samuel Ramey, Livia Buday-Batky, Anne Gjevang, Sherrill Milnes – Hungaroton Opera Chorus, Hungarian State Orchestra Giuseppe Patanè – (Hungaroton)
- 2001: Violeta Urmana, Plácido Domingo, Lado Ataneli, Luciana d'Intino, Roberto Scandiuzzi, Elisabetta Fiorillo – Müncher Rundfunkorchester & Chorus Marcello Viotti – (EMI)
- 2005: Andrea Gruber, Marco Berti, Alberto Mastromarino, Carlo Colombara, Ildikó Komlósi, Elisabetta Fiorillo – Orchestra, Coro e Corpo di ballo dell'Arena di Verona, Donato Renzetti – Dynamic

=== Film or video ===
- 1979: Kirk Browning directed a television film with Renata Scotto (La Gioconda) – for which Scotto won an Emmy, Luciano Pavarotti (Enzo Grimaldo), Stefania Toczyska (Laura Adorno), Margarita Lilowa (La Cieca), Norman Mittelmann (Barnaba), and Ferruccio Furlanetto (Alvise Badoero).
- 1986: Ádám Fischer conducts Vienna State Opera Orchestra, with Éva Marton (La Gioconda), Plácido Domingo (Enzo Grimaldo), Ludmila Semtschuk (Laura Adorno), Kurt Rydl (Alvise Badoero), Margarita Lilova (La Cieca) and Matteo Manuguerra (Barnaba). Arthaus DVD and blu-ray.
- 1988: Television film made in Barcelona at the Liceu, with Grace Bumbry (La Gioconda), Fiorenza Cossotto (Laura Adorno), Viorica Cortez (La Cieca), Ermanno Mauro (Enzo Grimaldo), Ivo Vinco (Alvise Badoero), Matteo Manuguerra (Barnaba).
- 2005: Daniele Callegari conducts Orquestra Sinfonica i Cor del Gran Teatre del Liceu, with Deborah Voigt (La Gioconda), Richard Margison (Enzo Grimaldo), Elizabeth Fiorillo (Laura Adorno), Carlo Colombara (Alvise Badoero), Ewa Podleś (La Cieca) and Carlo Guelfi (Barnaba); Pier Luigi Pizzi (director and set/costume designer). Co-production with Arena di Verona. TDK DVD.
- 2005: Live video recording made at the Arena di Verona: Donato Renzetti (conductor) – Pier Luigi Pizzi (stage director)
  Cast: Andrea Gruber, Marco Berti, Carlo Colombara, Alberto Mastromarino, Ildikó Komlósi, Elisabetta Fiorillo; Pier Luigi Pizzi (director and set/costume designer). Co-production with Teatre del Liceu. Dynamic DVD Cat.33500

== Adaptations in other media ==
- La gioconda (US title: The Fighting Prince): Directed by Giacinto Solito with Alba Arnova (La Gioconda), Paolo Carlini (Enzo Grimaldi), Virginia Loy (Laura Adorno), Peter Trent (Alvise Badoero), Vittorio Vaser (Barnaba), Gino Scotti (Jacopo) and Giuseppe Campora, Attilio Dottesio, Ina La Yana and Vira Silenti (Italy, 1953, b/w).

== See also ==
- List of operas by Ponchielli

== Sources ==
- Full libretto of La Gioconda on impresario.ch, 2005 (In English) Retrieved 10 July 2011
- Lascelles, George and Antony Peattie (Eds.), The New Kobbe's Opera Book London: Ebury Press, 1997. ISBN 0-09-181410-3
- Holden, Amanda (Ed.), The New Penguin Opera Guide, New York: Penguin Putnam, 2001. ISBN 0-14-029312-4
- Sadie, Stanley (Ed.), The New Grove Book of Operas, London: Macmillan Publishers Ltd, 1996. ISBN 0-333-65107-3
