= Konrad Zöllner von Rotenstein =

23rd Grandmaster of the Teutonic Order

Konrad Zollner von Rotenstein
- Hochmeister
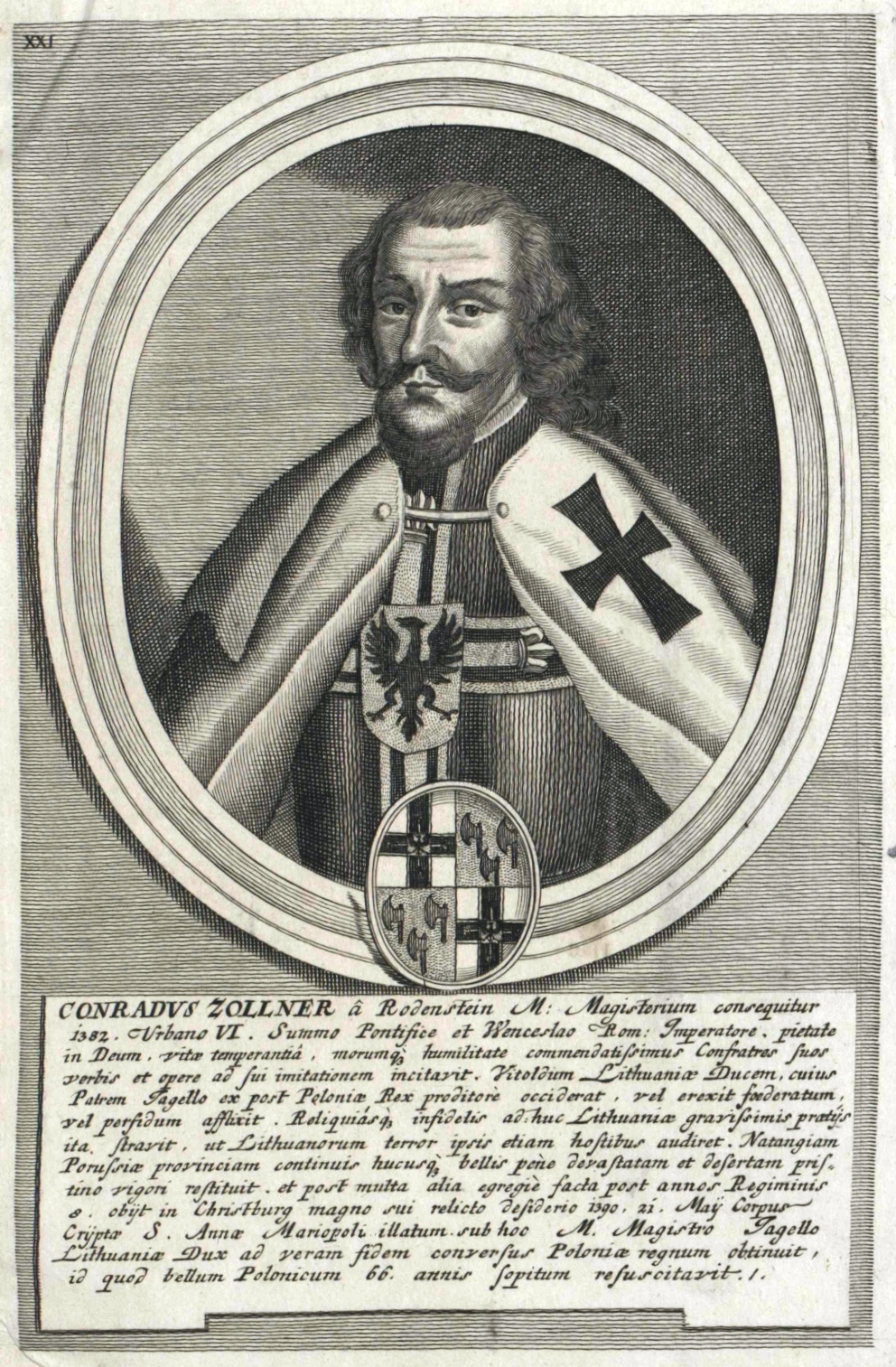
- 1684 illustration of Konrad

Grand Master of the Teutonic Knights
- Reign: October 5, 1382 - August 20, 1390
- Predecessor: Winrich von Kniprode
- Successor: Konrad von Wallenrode
- Born: c. 1325; Likely Birkenfeld, Maroldsweisach, Haßberge
- Died: August 20, 1395; Christburg
- Burial: Under the Chapel of St. Anne in the Malbork Castle, Marienburg
- Family: Zollner von Rottenstein

Konrad Zöllner von Rotenstein (c. 1325 – August 20, 1390) was the 23rd Grandmaster of the Teutonic Order from October 5, 1382, to his death on August 20, 1390.

== Biography ==
Konrad was likely born in Birkenfeld, Maroldsweisach, Haßberge.

Konrad became procurator of Preußisch Mark in 1353 and "Komtur" of Danzig in 1368. He became chief trapper and komtur of Christburg in 1372.

Following the death of Winrich von Kniprode, Konrad was elected Grandmaster of the Teutonic Order on October 5, 1382. As leader of the monastic order, he largely focused on internal matters, leaving foreign policy to Konrad von Wallenrode, who was appointed Marshal of the Order and Komtur of Konigsberg. He reformed the administrative structure of Teutonic Prussia, promoted German settlement, and attempted to found a university in the city of Kulm, though the latter never came to fruition. He also, like his predecessor, combated usery, reducing the maximuim interest rate from 10% to 8.33%, with violators having their capital confiscated. The city of Passenheim was granted city rights in 1386.

During Konrad's reign, tensions between the Teutonic Order and the Grand Duchy of Lithuania escalated. Attempts to Christianize Lithuania (which was one of the few areas in Europe that remained pagan) in 1383 failed, and although Lithuania adopted Christianity in 1386, relations only soured more as the baptism of Grand Duke Władysław II Jagiełło was done to facilitate the marriage between him and the Queen of Poland, Jadwiga. This meant that Lithuania and Poland, who was the primary rival of the Teutonic Order, had entered into a personal union. In his later reign, the order was beset by numerous internal issues; in 1383, a plague outbreak occurred, and in later years, crop failures, and declining fishing and trade output wreaked havoc upon the state.

Konrad died in Christburg on August 20, 1390. His body was buried in the Marienburg castle in the mausoleum of grandmaster under the chapel of St. Anne.

Grand Master of the Teutonic Order
Preceded by Winrich von Kniprode	Hochmeister; 1382–1390	Succeeded by Konrad von Wallenrode
