= I Mori di Valenza =

Opera by Amilcare Ponchielli (premiered 1914)

- Opera by Amilcare Ponchielli
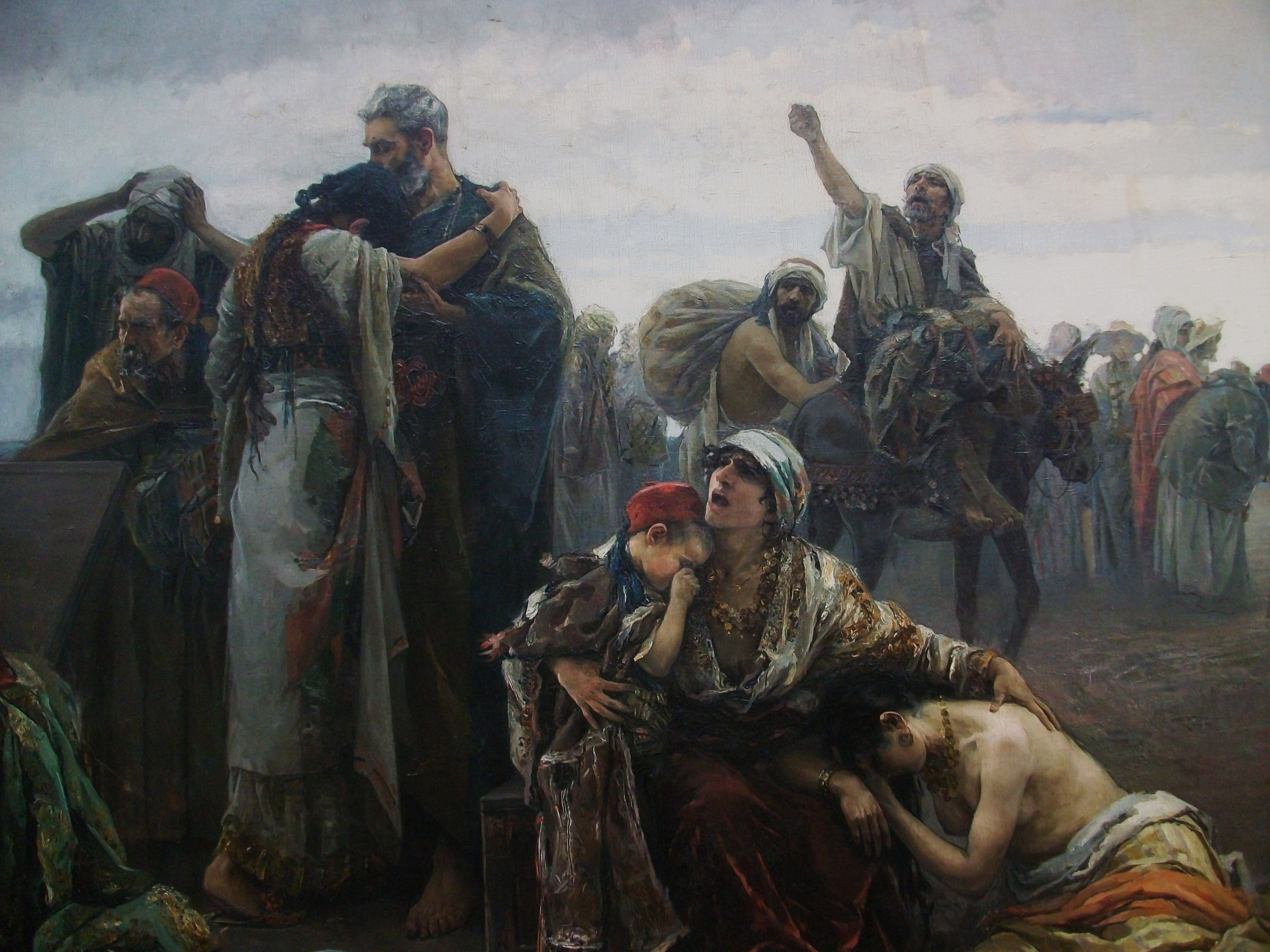
- Gabriel Puig Roda's depiction of the expulsion of the Moriscos from Spain, the historical setting of the opera
- Librettist: Antonio Ghislanzoni
- Premiere: 17 March 1914; Théâtre du Casino, Monaco

I Mori di Valenza (The Moors of Valencia) is an opera in four acts composed by Amilcare Ponchielli to a libretto by Antonio Ghislanzoni. Ponchielli began composing the work in 1874, but at the time of his death in 1886, only the piano score for the first three acts and part of the fourth had been completed. The opera was later revised by Ponchielli's son Annibale and the orchestration and fourth act were completed by Arturo Cadore. It premiered on 17 March 1914 at the Théâtre du Casino in Monaco and ran for three performances.

The story is set in Valencia in the early 17th century when Philip III decreed the expulsion of the Moriscos (the descendants of the Moors) from Spain. Ghislanzoni's libretto was based on Piquillo Alliaga, a novel by Eugène Scribe.

Following the world premiere in Monaco, the opera was performed the following July at the Arena di Milano conducted by Antonio Guarneri, and received further performances in January 1915 at the Teatro Ponchielli in Cremona. Although warmly received by the audiences in Monaco, Milan and Cremona, I Mori di Valenza has never been revived. However, a full-length recording of the opera was made in Cremona in 2007 and released on the Bongiovanni label the following year.
