= I Lituani =

Opera by Amilcare Ponchielli

I Lithuani
- Opera by Amilcare Ponchielli
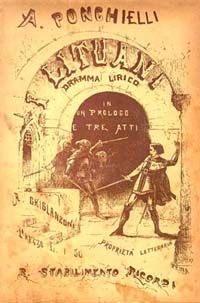
- Poster from the opera's 19th century production
- Librettist: Antonio Ghislanzoni
- Language: Italian
- Premiere: 7 March 1874; Teatro all Scala, Milan

I Lituani (The Lithuanians) is an opera consisting of a prologue and three acts by Amilcare Ponchielli to an Italian libretto by Antonio Ghislanzoni, based on the historical poem Konrad Wallenrod written by Lithuanian-Polish poet Adam Mickiewicz. It premiered at La Scala in Milan on 7 March 1874.

== History ==
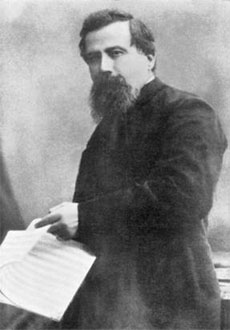
Composer Amilcare Ponchielli

Casa Ricordi commissioned Ponchielli to write the opera, and the idea to use Konrad Wallenrod came from Salvatore Farina, a novelist and playwright working for Ricordi. The opera was extremely well received when it opened, and a second, final version with additional material was performed again a year later also to good reviews. It continued to be performed in the last decades of the 19th century in Cremona, Trieste, Brescia, Rome, Turin, Buenos Aires, Montevideo, Chicago, and a single noteworthy Russian performance in 1884 at the Imperial Bolshoi Kamenny Theatre in Saint Petersburg with the title Aldona.

After a three-night run in 1903 at La Scala, where the casting was particularly poorly reviewed, it was scheduled for performances in 1939 that did not take place because Second World War broke out; I Lituani was not performed again until 1979 when RAI recovered the score. Since then, it has been revived in Chicago (1981, 1983 and 1991), Toronto (1981), Cremona (1984), Vilnius (1991, 2026), Trakai (2009) and Kaunas (2020).

== Roles ==
Opening nights of La Scala performances:

Role	Lithuanian Name	Voice type	Premiere cast, 7 March 1874 (Conductor: Franco Faccio)	6 March 1875 (Conductor: Franco Faccio)	5 April 1903 (Conductor: Arturo Toscanini)
Arnoldo, Lithuanian prince	Arnoldas	baritone	Francesco Pandolfini	Andriano Panteleoni	Ramón Blanchart
Aldona, his sister	Aldona	soprano	Antonietta Frietsche	Maddalena Mariani Masi	Elena Bianchini-Cappelli
Albano, an old bard	Albinas	bass	Giulio Petit	Ormondo Maini	Oreste Luppi
Walter, Aldona's husband, Corrado Wallenrod	Valteris	tenor	Luigi Bolis	Luigi Bolis	Michele Mariacher
Vitoldo, a Lithuanian renegade, chief judge	Vytautas	bass			
A minstrel		soprano			
Commanders, Teutonic Knights, German and Lithuanian soldiers, judges, pages, bards, minstrels, people, abbots, monks, friars (chorus and supernumeraries)

== Synopsis ==
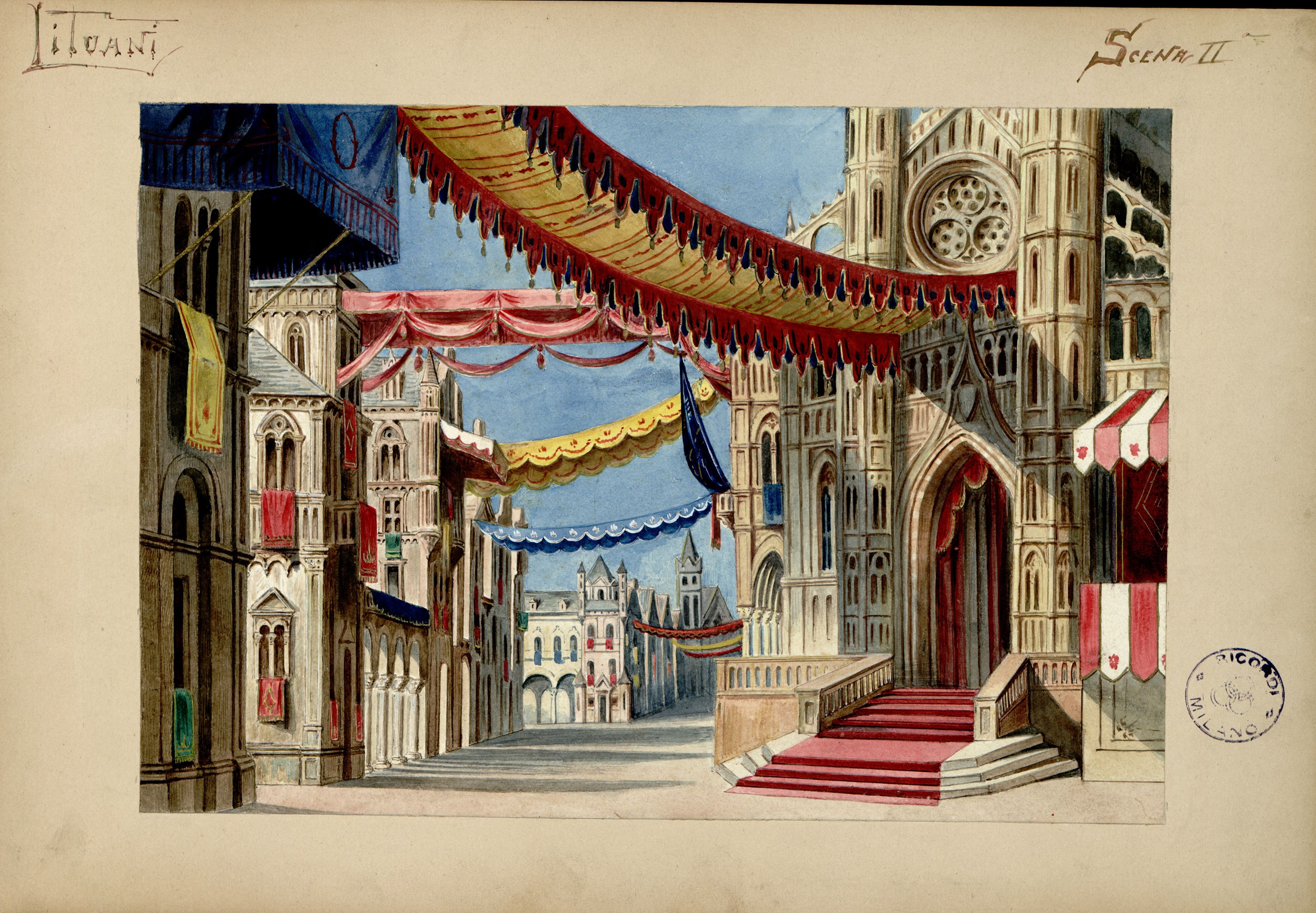
La piazza della Cattedrale a Marienburgo, set design for I Lituani act 1 scene 2 (1874).

Place: Lithuania (prologue), Marienburg (acts I-III)
Time: 14th century

Corrado Wallenrod, actually a Lithuanian named Walter who is impersonating a loyal Teutonic Knight, allows the Lithuanians to win against the Teutons by executing a long-planned misdirection. Aldona, his wife who has entered a convent, searches for her love Walter, and finds him just before he is sentenced to death for his deception.

=== Prologue ===
From the battlements of a castle in Lithuania, Albano, an aged bard, moans that his country is being destroyed by the Teutons. Aldona, a Lithuanian princess, wonders about her brother, Arnoldo, and Walter, her husband, and invites everyone to pray. Arnoldo and Walter return and announce a heinous betrayal by Vitoldo, one of their leaders, which has led to the defeat of the Lithuanian army. Walter tells his wife about his plan to defeat the Teutonic Knights, and swears his eternal love for her before leaving to avenge the Lithuanians ("Mia sposa, angelo mio..." : Walter, Aldona).

=== Act 1 ===
Ten years later, in the cathedral square of Marienburg, the Teutonic Knights celebrate the new Grand Master of the Teutonic Order, Corrado Wallenrod, who is actually Walter. Vitoldo is furious, because he believes he should be Grand Master. Ten Lithuanian prisoners in chains are brought to be sacrificed in Corrado's honour at the celebration; Arnoldo is one of them. Corrado unexpectedly frees them, and afterwards Arnoldo realizes that Corrado is actually Walter (Aria, O rimembranze : Arnoldo). Arnoldo runs into his sister, Aldona, who has come to Marienburg after entering a convent, hoping to find Walter. Albano, Arnoldo, and Aldona set out to find Walter in the castle.

=== Act 2 ===
In a large hall of the castle where the celebration is being held, Corrado invites everyone to dance and sing. Arnoldo and Aldona, disguised as bards, sing about the sad fate of Lithuania, predicting its imminent liberation (Sui Lituani... La dolce patria, un di fiorente e lieta : Arnoldo). The Teutonic Knights object, and Corrado hurls himself towards Arnoldo, while Aldona tries to separate them. Corrado orders the knights to sheath their swords, and Albano tries to convince Corrado not to give his true identity away. Vitoldo recognizes Aldona, but Corrado orders the judgement against Aldona and Arnoldo be adjourned so that the celebration can continue.

=== Act 3 ===
Aldona comes out of the ruins of a cloister, where a battle between the Lithuanians and Teutonic Knights is taking place nearby (Come lugubre : Aldona). She meets Walter, and hopes for a happy future of love, but Walter has been betrayed for causing the defeat of the Teutonic Knights by the Lithuanians. Later, back in the castle, Albano tells Walter that a secret court has sentenced Walter to death. Rather than falling into enemy hands, Walter drinks poison and exults in the victory of the Lithuanians, asking Albano to give Aldona his last farewell. Aldona arrives, and Walter dies in her arms. The Willi, divine spirits of Lithuania, arrive to welcome the glorious warrior's soul.

== Recordings ==
Ponchielli's signature on the score of I Lituani

- The first performance since 1903 was on January 12, 1979, by the Turin RAI Symphony Orchestra and Chorus, conducted by Gianandrea Gavazzeni and featuring Alessandro Cassis as Arnoldo, Yasuko Hayashi as Aldona, Carlo de Bortoli as Albano, Ottavio Garaventa as Walter/Corrado Wallenrod, Ambrogio Riva as Vitoldo, and Susanna Ghione as a minstrel. Several aircheck recordings of this radio broadcast have been available on LP and CD, and in January 2006, a CD was released that was remastered from the original RAI source tapes, which also includes the Italian libretto and an English translation. (Bongiovanni GB 2390/91-2)
- Balkan Records released a 14 June 1981 recording of a live performance in Lithuanian with the Lithuanian Opera Company of Chicago Orchestra and Chorus. (Balkan CCD-1018-2)
