= Janek (opera) =

Janek is a Polish-language opera in 2 Acts by Władysław Żeleński to a libretto by Ludomił German (1851-1920). It was premiered 4 October 1900 in Lvov. The opera makes references to Polish folk tunes but otherwise is in the then current verismo style. The most popular aria is Janek's dumka from act 1.

== Plot ==
Set in the Tatra Mountains in the 18th century. Janek, leader of a band of robbers, arrives wounded at the cottage of the sweet natured Bronka, fiancée of Stach. Jealous of the developing romance between Janek and Bronka, Janek's own girlfriend the wild Marynka urges Stach to violence.

== Characters ==
- Janek - leader of the robbers tenor
- Marynka - bethrothed to Janek mezzo
- Bronka - bethrothed to Stach soprano
- Stach - mountain villager baritone
- Marek - elderly villager bass

== Recording ==
- Janek Malgorzata Grzegorzewicz-Rodek, Agnieszka Kuk, Women's Choir of the Henryk Wieniawski Philharmonic in Lublin, I Signori Men's Vocal Ensemble, the Henryk Wieniawski Philharmonic Orchestra in Lublin, Wojciech Rodek 2CD Naxos 2023
