= Alfred Orda =

- Born: Alfred Orda-Wdowczak; 1915; Łódź, Poland
- Died: 2004, aged 88
- Occupation: Opera singer

Alfred Orda (full name Alfred Orda-Wdowczak; 1915–2004) was a Polish operatic baritone and soloist. Most of his life and performance career was spent in the United Kingdom. He was a regular performer at the BBC Proms, especially from 1943 to 1964. Orda was born in Łódź, Poland.

== Early singing career ==
"There was always singing in his life, for his mother had a good contralto voice."

"While still at technical high school, his vocal potential was recognized, and at the age of 19, he had his first singing lessons with Adele Comte-Wilgocka at the Łódź Conservatorium. Soon, with a repertoire of Eri tu, Di Provenza, the Prologue from Pagliacci, and Valentin's aria from Faust, he set off on foot to Warsaw, a distance of 80 miles, in search of further training." In 1936, he traveled to Milan, Italy, where for the next three years he studied under the direction of Alfredo Cecchi, a teacher amongst whose students had been Basiola, Granda, and Ziliani.

== Leaving Italy ==
Early in 1940, Orda was advised to leave Italy since war was imminent. He met other Polish students and refugees and made his way to France, eventually reaching England. Orda travelled to Scotland and before long, he was singing professionally, engaged as a soloist with the Scottish Orchestra. His first concert on 12 January 1941, was conducted by Warwick Braithwaite and contained 'Eri tu' and Prince Igor's aria. The correspondent of the Glasgow Evening Times reported (on 13 January 1941) that "Orda proved himself a possessor of a voice of international celebrity standard". After his second concert the following year, the Glasgow Times reviewer wrote (on 5 January 1942) that "there are few living singers with a voice of such quality". While in Glasgow, Orda met his future wife.

== Early credits ==
In 1942, Orda made his first British operatic appearance as Valentin in 'Faust' with the Carl Rosa Company. In 1943, he was engaged by Sir Henry Wood for the Promenade Concert Season in the Royal Albert Hall. With Sir Adrian Boult, and the BBC Symphony Orchestra he sang the Polonaise from 'Verbum Nobile' by Moniuszko. That season was the start of a succession of concerts and recitals for the BBC for over 25 years. A notice in the Times, regarding his Promenade Concert in 1944, described Orda as "a baritone with a freely-produced, resonant but agreeable soft textured voice who flung forth his melody as it might have been early Verdi, and at once captured the audience".

From 1945 to 1946, he toured with the Polish Opera Company in Canada, USA (New York, Chicago, Philadelphia and Detroit) performing main baritone roles in popular operas, continuing to receive glowing press notices. Between 1946 and 1947, Orda appeared as Silvio in 'Il Pagliacci' with the City Centre Opera in New York and further engagements with Salmaggi Company at the Brooklyn Academy of Music and at the Carnegie Hall with the International Opera Company.

In 1948, he attended auditions at the Metropolitan Opera House but was immediately recruited by Georges Hirsch, the Director of the Paris Opera (who was in New York the time) to appear as Valentin in 'Faust'. The French press published glowing reviews on his début. In 1953, Orda joined the Sadler's Wells Opera Company which he remained with for four years. In 1955, he shared a BBC studio concert with Dame Joan Sutherland in a Hugo Wolf program, accompanied by the London Symphony Orchestra under Walter Goehr. In 1956, he sang in two broadcast studio performances of 'Alceste' by Gluck, under Geraint Jones, among other soloists such as Flagstad, Raoul Jobin, Alexander Young, Thomas Hemsley and Marion Lowe. Further major engagements that year took him to the Royal Festival Hall in a program conducted by Sir Malcolm Sargent.

In 1957, for personal reasons, Orda reluctantly turned down an invitation from the Royal Opera House to sing the role of Amonasro in 'Aida' in the 1958/59 Convent Garden season. From this period, he concentrated on concerts and recital work, mainly appearing as a soloist in the BBC Promenade Concerts.

Orda was undoubtedly a major contender in the international operatic stage, and had not been for his temperamental character, he would have enjoyed the same celebrity status as some of his better-known contemporary rivals, such as Tito Gobbi. With a no-nonsense and blunt attitude, Orda probably ostracized himself from the operatic mainstream. Unfortunate episodes—such as rubbing the wrong way the likes of Von Karajan and the Director of the Metropolitan Opera House—kept him away from some of the main opera houses.

== Death ==
In 2004, at age 88, Orda suffered a fatal heart attack on his way home after visiting his hospitalized wife which led to his death. His recorded performances can still be heard on various websites and music archives.
