= Arturo Cadore =

Italian composer and organist

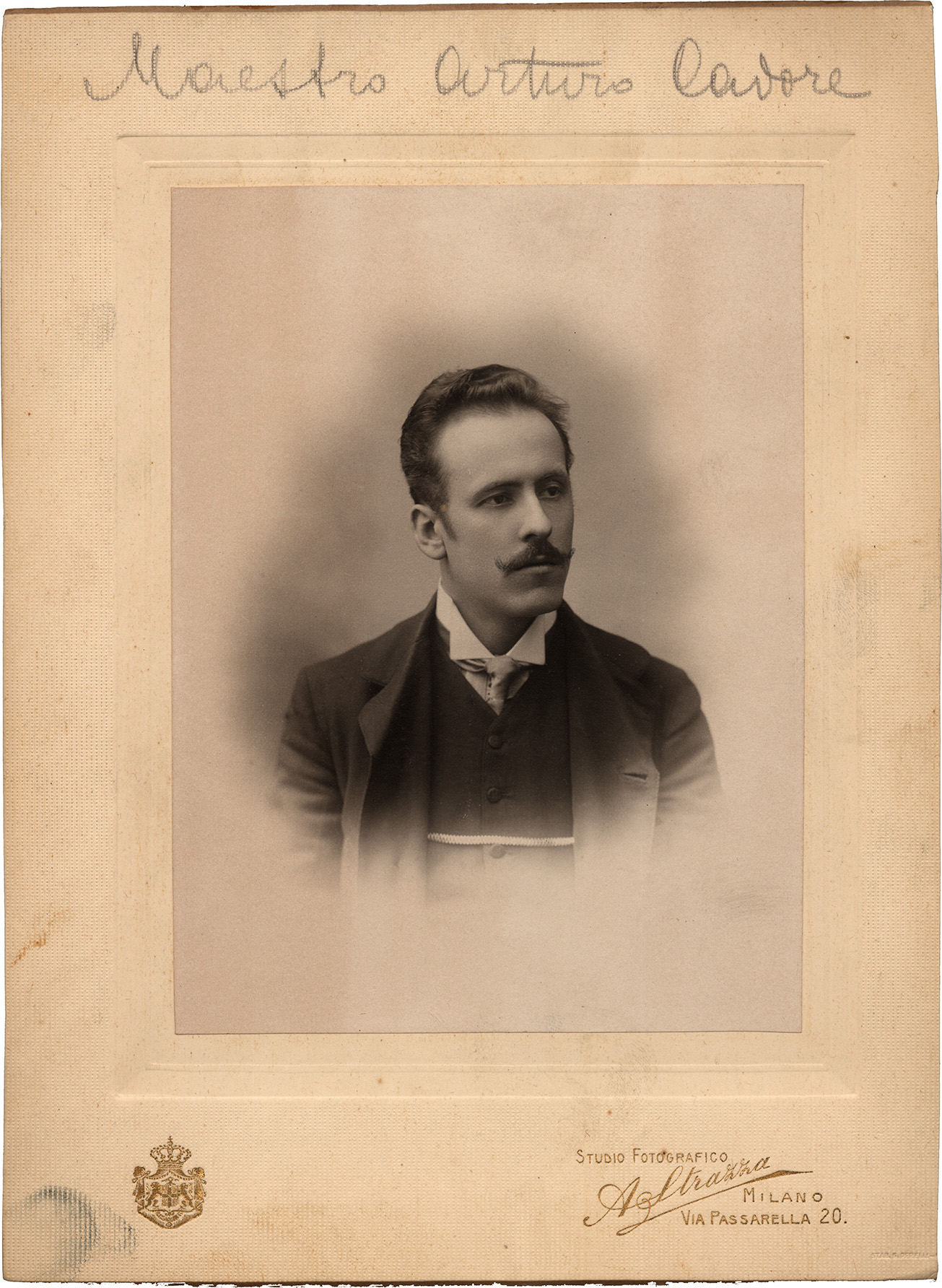
Arturo Cadore

Arturo Cadore (15 September 1877 – 25 June 1929) was an Italian composer and organist. Born in Soresina (Province of Cremona), he primarily composed operettas and parlor songs, and comic operas. He is also known for having completed Amilcare Ponchielli's opera I Mori di Valenza which had been left unfinished when the composer died in 1886 and was premiered posthumously in 1914. In his later years he was the organist at the Chiesa di San Vittore in Olona (near Varese). Cadore died in Gaggiano at the age of 51.

== Stage works ==
- I vespri siciliani, (libretto by Giuseppe Menin), operetta, premiered Caffè Aurora, Milan, 25 August 1896
- Il Natale (libretto by Romeo Carugati), opera in one act (later two), premiered Teatro dal Verme, Milan, 7 September 1902
- Neroncino (librettist unknown), dance opera in three acts, premiered Teatro Lirico, Milan, 1906
- La rondinella (libretto by Angelo Nessi), premiered Teatro Carcano, Milan, 21 February 1920
