= Amilcare Ponchielli =

Italian opera composer (1834–1886)

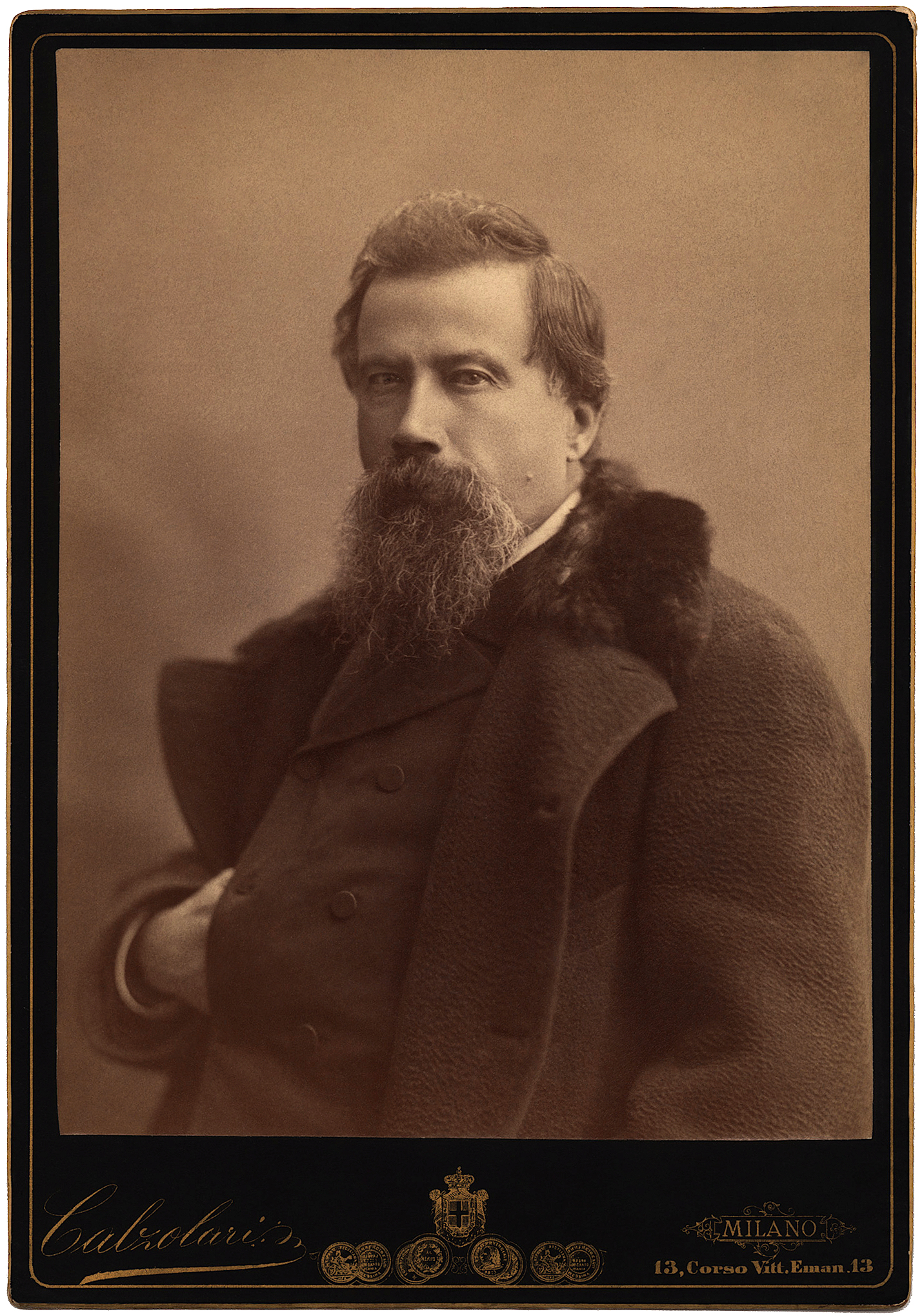
- Born: 31 August 1834; Paderno Fasolaro, Lombardy–Venetia
- Died: 16 January 1886 (aged 51); Milan, Italy
- Education: Milan Conservatory
- Occupations: Composer; academic
- Organizations: Bergamo Cathedral; Milan Conservatory
- Works: List of operas
- Spouse: Teresina Brambilla (m. 1874)

Amilcare Ponchielli (US: /ˌpɒŋkiˈɛli, ˌpɔːŋ-/, Italian: [aˈmilkare poŋˈkjɛlli]; 31 August 1834 – 16 January 1886) was an Italian opera composer, best known for his opera La Gioconda. He was married to the soprano Teresina Brambilla.

== Life and work ==
Born in Paderno Fasolaro (now Paderno Ponchielli) near Cremona, then Kingdom of Lombardy-Venetia, Ponchielli won a scholarship at the age of nine to study music at the Milan Conservatory, writing his first symphony by the time he was ten years old.

In 1856, he wrote his first opera—based on Alessandro Manzoni's novel The Betrothed (I promessi sposi)—and it was as an opera composer that he eventually found fame.

His early career was disappointing. Manoeuvred out of a professorship at the Milan Conservatory that he had won in a competition, he took small-time jobs in small cities and composed several operas, none successful at first. In spite of his disappointment, he gained much experience as the bandmaster (capobanda) in Piacenza and Cremona, arranging and composing over 200 works for wind band. Notable among his "original" compositions for band are the first-ever concerto for euphonium (Concerto per Flicornobasso, 1872), fifteen variations on the popular Parisian song "Carnevale di Venezia", and a series of festive and funeral marches that resound with the pride of the newly unified Italy and the private griefs of his fellow Cremonese. The turning point was the big success of the revised version of I promessi sposi in 1872, which brought him a contract with the music publisher G. Ricordi & Co. and the musical establishment at the Conservatory and at La Scala. The role of Lina in the revised version was sung by Teresina Brambilla, whom he married in 1874. Their son Annibale became a music critic and minor composer. The ballet Le due gemelle (1873) confirmed his success.

The following opera, I Lituani (The Lithuanians) of 1874, had a three-night run in 1903 at La Scala, where the casting was particularly poorly reviewed; it was scheduled for performances in 1939 that did not take place because the Second World War broke out, and it was not performed again until 1979, when RAI recovered the score. It has been revived several times since then. His best-known opera is La Gioconda (1876), which his librettist Arrigo Boito adapted from the same play by Victor Hugo that had been previously set by Saverio Mercadante as Il giuramento in 1837 and Carlos Gomes as Fosca in 1873. The opera contains the famous ballet Dance of the Hours as the third act finale. It was first produced in 1876 and revised several times. The version that has become popular today was first given in 1880.

In 1876, he started working on I Mori di Valenza, although the project dates back to 1873. It was an opera that he never finished, although it was completed later by Arturo Cadore and performed posthumously in 1914.

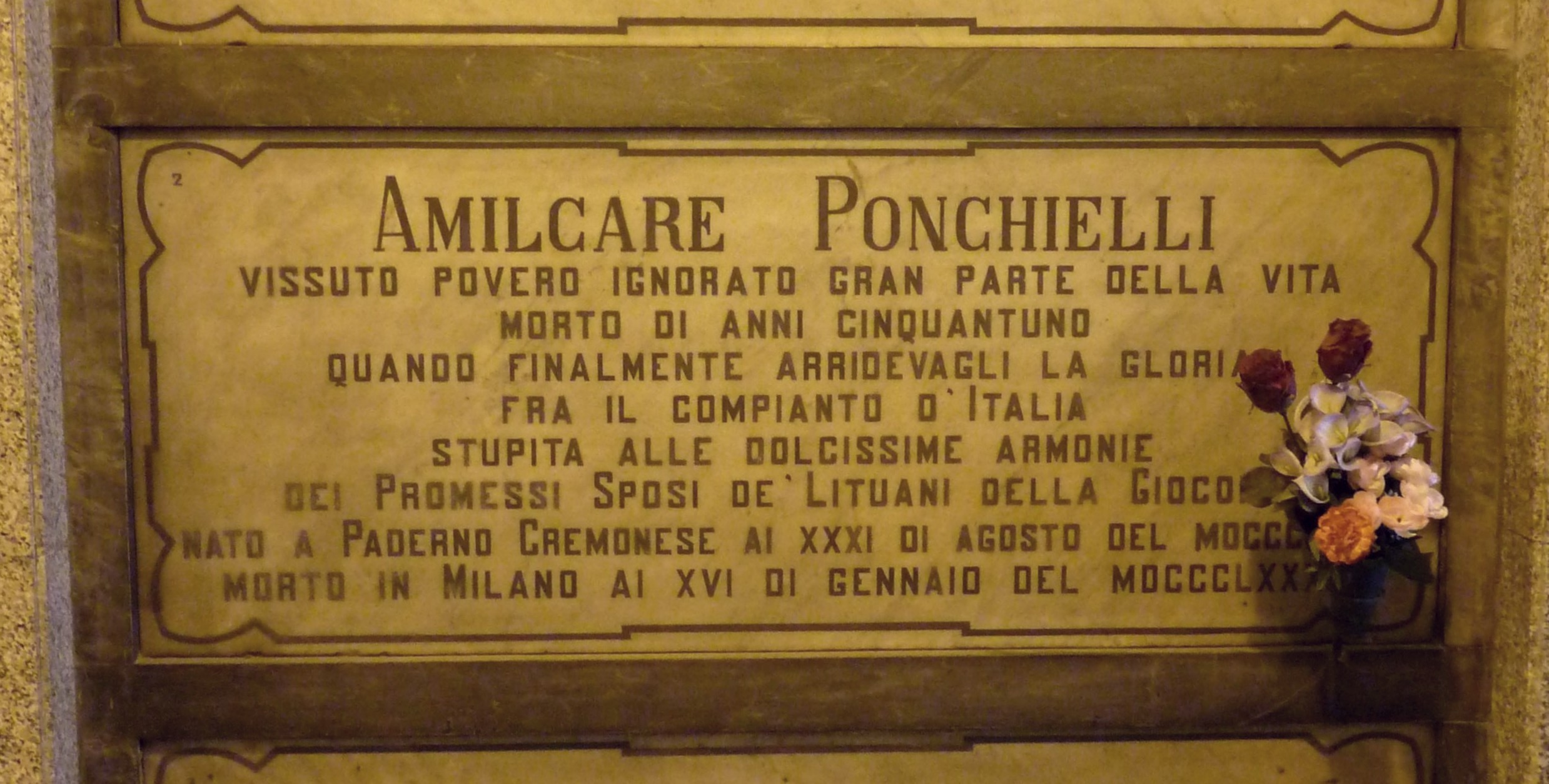
Ponchielli's grave at the Monumental Cemetery of Milan, Italy.

After La Gioconda, Ponchielli wrote the monumental biblical melodrama in four acts, Il figliuol prodigo, given in Milan at La Scala on 26 December 1880, and Marion Delorme, from another play by Victor Hugo, which was presented at La Scala on 17 March 1885. In spite of their rich musical invention, neither of these operas met with the same success, but both exerted great influence on the composers of the rising generation, such as Giacomo Puccini, Pietro Mascagni, and Umberto Giordano.

In 1881, Ponchielli was appointed maestro di cappella of the Bergamo Cathedral, and from the same year, he was a professor of composition at the Milan Conservatory, where among his students were Puccini, Mascagni, Emilio Pizzi, and Giovanni Tebaldini.

He died of pneumonia in Milan in 1886 and was interred in the city's Monumental Cemetery.

== Legacy ==
External audio
- You may listen to Ponchielli's opera La Gioconda as sung by Maria Callas, Fedora Barbieri, Gianni Poggi, Paolo Silveri, Giulio Neri with Antonino Votto conducting the Orchestra della RAI Torino in 1952 here on archive.org

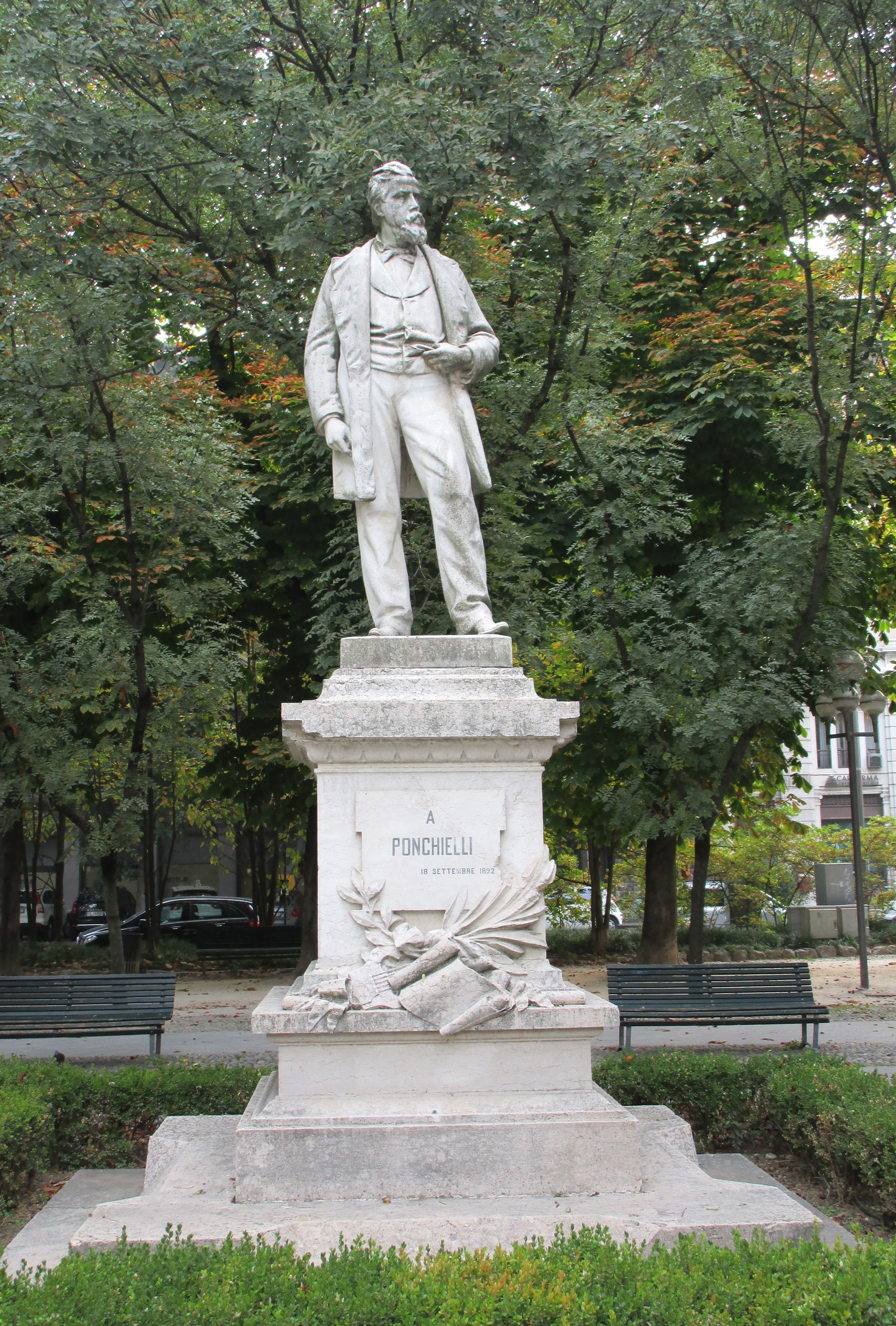
A statue of Ponchielli in Cremona, Italy.

Although in his lifetime Ponchielli was very popular and influential (and introduced an enlarged orchestra and more complex orchestration), only one of his operas, La Gioconda, is regularly performed today. It contains a strong and memorable aria for contralto, 'Voce de donna o d'angelo' (the Rosary song); the great tenor romanza "Cielo e mar"; a well-known duet for tenor and baritone titled "Enzo Grimaldo, Principe Di Santafior"; the soprano aria "Suicidio!"; and the ballet Dance of the Hours, which is widely known thanks in part to its having been featured in Walt Disney's Fantasia in 1940, in Allan Sherman's novelty song "Hello Muddah, Hello Fadduh", and in numerous other popular works.

== Bibliography ==
- Kaufman: Annals of Italian Opera: Verdi and his Major Contemporaries; Garland Publishing, New York and London, 1990. (contains premiere casts and performance histories of Ponchielli's operas)
- Budden, Julien (1992), 'Ponchielli, Amilcare' in The New Grove Dictionary of Opera, ed. Stanley Sadie (London) ISBN 0-333-73432-7
- Various authors: Amilcare Ponchielli; Nuove Edizioni, Milan, 1985
- Various authors: Amilcare Ponchielli 1834–1886, Cremona, 1984
- Sirch, Licia; Henry Howey: "The Doctrine of a Critical Edition of the Band Music of Amilcare Ponchielli"

An Amilcare Ponchielli Bibliography-

Books, Collections, Proceedings and Correspondence

- "All'illustre Maestro Ponchielli." Cesare Bignami to Amilcare Ponchielli. 20 November 1875. Conservatorio Universitario de Musica, Montevideo, Uruguay.
- Adami, Giuseppe. Giulio ricordi e i suoi musicisti. Milano: Edizioni Fratelli Treves, 1933.
- Albarosa, Nino, comp. Amilcare Ponchielli, 1834–1886: Saggi e ricerche nel 150 anniversario della nascita. Casalmorano: cassa rurale ed artigiana di Casalmorano, 1987.
- Amilcare Ponchielli to Egregio Avvocato. 3 January 1877. Music Library, General Manuscript Collection, Northwestern University, Evanston, Illinois.
- Cesari, Gaetano. Amilcare Ponchielli nell'arte del suo tempo (ricordi e carteggi). Cremona, 1934.
- Damerini, Adelmo. Amilcare Ponchielli. Torino: Arione, 1940.
- DeNapoli, G. Amilcare Ponchielli (1834–1886): La vita, le opere, l'epistolario, le onoranze. Cremona, 1936.
- Ferraris, Castelli Maria, and Giampiero Tintori. Amilcare Ponchielli. Cremona: Centro Culturale, 1984.
- Gordon, John. "Circe, La Gioconda, and the Opera House of the Mind", in Bronze by Gold, pp. 277–93.
- Habla, Bernhard, ed. Kongressberichte Oberschützen/Burgenland 1988; Toblach/ Südtirol 1990. Proceedings. Tutzing: Hans Schneider Tutzing, 1992.
- Hanslick, Eduard. "Gioconda." In Die Moderne Oper. Vol. iv. Musikalisches Skizzenbuch. Berlin: Hofmann, 1888.
- Ligasacchi, Giovanni. "Amilcare Ponchielli e la musica per banda." Proceedings of Il Repertorio Sommerso: Musica storica per la banda d'oggi. Palermo: Regione Siciliana, Assessorato dei beni culturali e ambientale e della pubblica istruzione, 2000.
- Mandelli, Alfonso. Inaugurazione del monumento ad Amilcare Ponchielli avvenuta in Cremona il 18 Settembre 1892. Cremona, 1892.
- Mandelli, Alfonso. Le distrazioni di A. Ponchielli. Cremona, 1897.
- Ponchielli, Amilcare, Francesco Cesari, Stefania Franceschini, and Raffaella Barbierato. Tuo affezionatissimo Amilcare Ponchielli: lettere 1856–1885. Padova: Il Poligrafo, 2010.
- Ponchielli, Amilcare. Pezzi per organo. Edited by Marco Ruggeri. Cremona: Turris Cremona, 1999.
- Rolandi, U. Nel centenario Ponchielliano: Amilcare Ponchielli librettista. Como, 1935.
- Shaw, George. Shaw's Music. Edited by D. H. Laurence. London, 1981.
- Sirch, Licia. Ponchielli e la musica per banda: atti della tavola rotonda, ridotto del teatro Ponchielli, 27 Aprile 2001. Proceedings. Pisa: ETS, 2005.
- Stock, Gilbert. "Das Kennfigur-System als Neuer Zugang zu Richard Wagners 'Leitmotiv'-Technik." In Der 'Komponist' Richard Wagner im Blick der Aktuellen Musikwissenschaft, 81–94. Wiesbaden: Breitkopf & Hartel, 2003.
- Tedeschi, Rubens. Addio, fiorito asil. Il melodramma Italiano da Boito al Verismo. Milano: Feltrinelli, 1978.
- Tomasi, G. Lanza. Guida all'opera. Milan, 1971.
- Wolf, Hugo. "Gioconda." In Hugo Wolf's Musikalische Kritiken, edited by Richard Batka and Heinrich Werner. Vaduz: Sandig, 2004.
- Zondergeld, Rein A. "Der Traum von Perfektion: Arrigo Boito, Librettist und Komponist." In Oper und Operntext, by Matthias Henneberger. Vol. 60. Heidelberg: Winter, 1985.

Periodicals

- "Con Verdi y Bellini." Scherzo – revista de musica 15 (2000): 126–27.
- "Metropolitan Opera: La Gioconda." Opera News, 3 February 1990, 22.
- "Obituary: Amilcare Ponchielli." The Musical Times and Singing Class Circular 27, no. 457 (1 February 1886): 94.
- "Ponchielli's Opera "I promessi sposi"" The Musical Times and Singing Class Circular 21, no. 454 (1 December 1880): 598–99.
- "Ponchielli's Opera "La Gioconda"" The Musical Times and Singing Class Circular 21, no. 450 (1 August 1880): 395–96.
- "Ponchielli's Opera "The Prodigal Son"" The Musical Times and Singing Class Circular 22, no. 457 (1 March 1881): 123–24.
- "The Revival of Amilcare Ponchielli's "Concerto Per Ficorno Basso"—Opus 155, Cremona, 1872." ITEA Journal, 1996, 42–49.
- Albright, William. "La Gioconda. Amilcare Ponchielli." The Opera Quarterly 7, no. 4 (1990): 167–72.
- Angeloni, Beppe, and Giampiero Tintori. Amilcare Ponchielli. Milano: Nuove edizioni, 1985.
- Arcais, Francesco. "Un maestro di musica Italiano: Amilcare Ponchielli." Nuova antalogia, 3rd ser., 1 (1 February 1886): 459–74.
- Arias, Enrique Alberto. "Ponchielli's "I Lituani" – Its Historical, Stylistic, and Literary Sources." Lituanus 37, no. 2 (June 1991): 89–96.
- Arrighi, Gino. "La dinastia musicale dei Puccini: proposte e quesiti." Quaderni pucciniani 5 (1982).
- Ashbrook, William. "La Gioconda: Amilcare Ponchielli." The Opera Quarterly 18, no. 1 (2002): 128.
- Bassi, Adriano. "Messa Solenne di Amilcare Ponchielli: analisi." Rivista internazionale di musica sacra 6, no. 4 (1985): 408.
- Bissoli, Francesco, and Amilcare Ponchielli. La lina di Ponchielli nel solco di un genere medio. Lucca: Libreria musicale Italiana, 2010.
- Caldini, Sandro. "Amilcare Ponchielli's "Capriccio"" The Double Reed 24, no. 1 (2001): 43.
- Campagnolo, Stefano. Problemi e metodi della filologia musicale: tre tavole rotonde. Lucca: Musica/Realta-LIM, 2000.
- Canning, Hugh. "Opera around the World: Italy – Palermo: "La Gioconda"" Opera, 2011, 814.
- Cognazzo, Roberto. "Distrazione fatale: la strana sorte di Amilcare Ponchielli." Arte organaria e organistica: periodico trimestrale 15, no. 67 (2008): 42.
- Damerini, Adelmo. "Una lettera inedita di A. Ponchielli." Musica d'oggi xvii (1935): 141–42.
- Descotes, Maurice. "Du Drame à l'Opéra: Les Transpositions Lyriques du Théâtre De Victor Hugo." Revue d'Histoire du Theatre 34, no. 2 (1982): 103.
- Farina, S. "Amilcare Ponchielli." Gazzetta musicale di Milano, 1900.
- Favia-Artsay, Aida. "Did Mascagni Write Cavalleria?" The Opera Quarterly 7, no. 2 (1990): 83.
- Fernandez-Martin, Luis Maria. "La Gioconda: Amilcare Ponchielli." Melomano: La revista de musica clasica 10, no. 102 (2005): 28.
- Forlani, Maria Giovanna. "Ricordo di Amilcare Ponchielli: Roderico, l'ultimo re dei goti, un'opera perduta di Ponchielli, rappresentata in prima assoluta a piacenza nel Carnevale 1863/64." Strenna piacentina 111 (1986).
- Franceschini, Stefania. "Tanti librettisti per un'opera di Ponchielli a lungo rimaneggiata (1856–1874)." Nuova rivista musicale Italiana 30, no. 3-4 (1996): 364.
- Gavazzeni, Gianandrea. "Considerazioni su di un centenario: A. Ponchielli." In trent'anni di musica, 57–62. Milan, 1958.
- Gossett, Philip. "Source Studies and Opera History." Cambridge Opera Journal 21, no. 2 (2009): 111–18.
- Howey, Henry. "Italian Bandmaster Ponchielli Left a Legacy of Over 300 Works." The Instrumentalist, 2003, 30–34.
- Innaurato, Albert. "A Primal Force." Opera News, 3 February 1990, 16.
- Klein, J. W. "Ponchielli: a Forlorn Figure." The Chesterian xxxiv (1959–60): 116–22.
- Knabel, Reiner. "Opera Around the World: Germany – Karlsruhe: ["La Gioconda"]." Opera, 2011, 936.
- Levine, Robert. ". Amilcare Ponchielli." The Opera Quarterly 6, no. 2 (1988): 140–41.
- Mila, M. "Caratteri della musica di Ponchielli." Pan ii (1934): 481–89.
- Mogridge, Geoffrey. "Opera Around the World: Croatia – Split." Opera, 2011, 1206.
- Morini, M. "Destino postumo dei mori di Valenza." La Scala, no. 91 (1957): 37–42.
- Osborne, Conrad L. "Depth Perception." Opera News, 2009, 22–25.
- Polignano, Antonio. "Costanti stilistiche ed elementi di drammaturgia musicale nelle due versioni del finale d'atto della Gioconda di Ponchielli (1876–1879)." Rivista Italiana di musicologia 27, no. 1-2 (1992): 327.
- Polignano, Antonio. "La storia della Gioconda attraverso il carteggio Ponichielli- ricordi." Nuova rivista musicale Italiana 21, no. 2 (1987): 228.
- Ponchielli, Amilcare. ""Dance of the Hours" from "La Gioconda" (1880)." International Piano, 2010, 39.
- Roman, Zoltan. "Italian Opera Premieres and Revivals in the Hungarian Press, 1864–1894." Periodica musica 6 (1988): 16–20.
- Sartori, C. "Il primo rimaneggiamento dei "Promessi sposi"" Rassegna dorica, 20 March 1938.
- Sirch, Licia. "Manoscritti di musica per banda di Amilcare Ponchielli." Muova rivista musicale Italiana 22, no. 2 (1988): 211–14.
- Sirch, Licia. "Ponchielli e il Sindaco Babbeo: l'esordio teatrale di un musicista a Milano nel 1851." Studi musicali 36, no. 1 (2007): 191–229.
- Tebaldini, G. "Amilcare Ponchielli." Musica d'oggi xvi (1934): 239–52.
- Tebaldini, G. "Il mio maestro." La Scala, no. 29 (1952): 32–36.

Dissertations

- Andreani, Elisabetta. Heinrich Heine e l'Italia: traduzioni e intonazioni nella seconda metà dell'Ottocento. Thesis, Universita degli studi di Milano. Milano, 2008.
- Bultema, Darci Ann. "The Songs of Amilcare Ponchielli". Diss., North Dakota State University. UMI, 2009.
- Edwards, Geoffrey Carleton. "Grand Et Vrai: Portrayals of Victor Hugo's Dramatic Characters in 19th-century Italian Opera". Diss., Northwestern University, 1991.
- Franceschini, Stefania. "Amilcare Ponchielli prima della Gioconda: gli anni della formazione". Diss., Universita degli studi di Venezia. Venice, 1993.
- Franini, Piera Anna. "Trent'anni di vita musicale al teatro grande (1871–1901).” Diss., Cattolica del sacro cuore. Milano, 1992.
- Nicolaisen, Jay Reed. "Italian Opera in Transition 1871–1893". Diss., University of California, Berkeley. 1977.
- Paglialonga, Phillip Orr. "Summary of Dissertation Performances: One Concerto Performance, One Chamber Music Performance and Two Clarinet Recitals (Performance).” Diss., University of Michigan. 2008.
- Redshaw, Jacqueline Gail Eastwood. "Chamber Music for the E-Flat Clarinet". Diss., The University of Arizona. 2007.
- Schwartz, Arman Raphael. "Modernity Sings: Rethinking Realism in Italian Opera". Diss., University of California, Berkeley. 2009.
- Tanner, Brian David. "Summary of Dissertation Performances: One Opera Project and Two Voice Recitals". Diss., University of Michigan. 2010.
- Vetere, Mary-Lou Patricia. "Italian Opera from Verdi to Verismo: Boito and La Scapigliatura". Diss., State University of New York at Buffalo. 2010.
