= Władysław Żeleński (composer) =

Polish composer, pianist and organist (1837–1921)

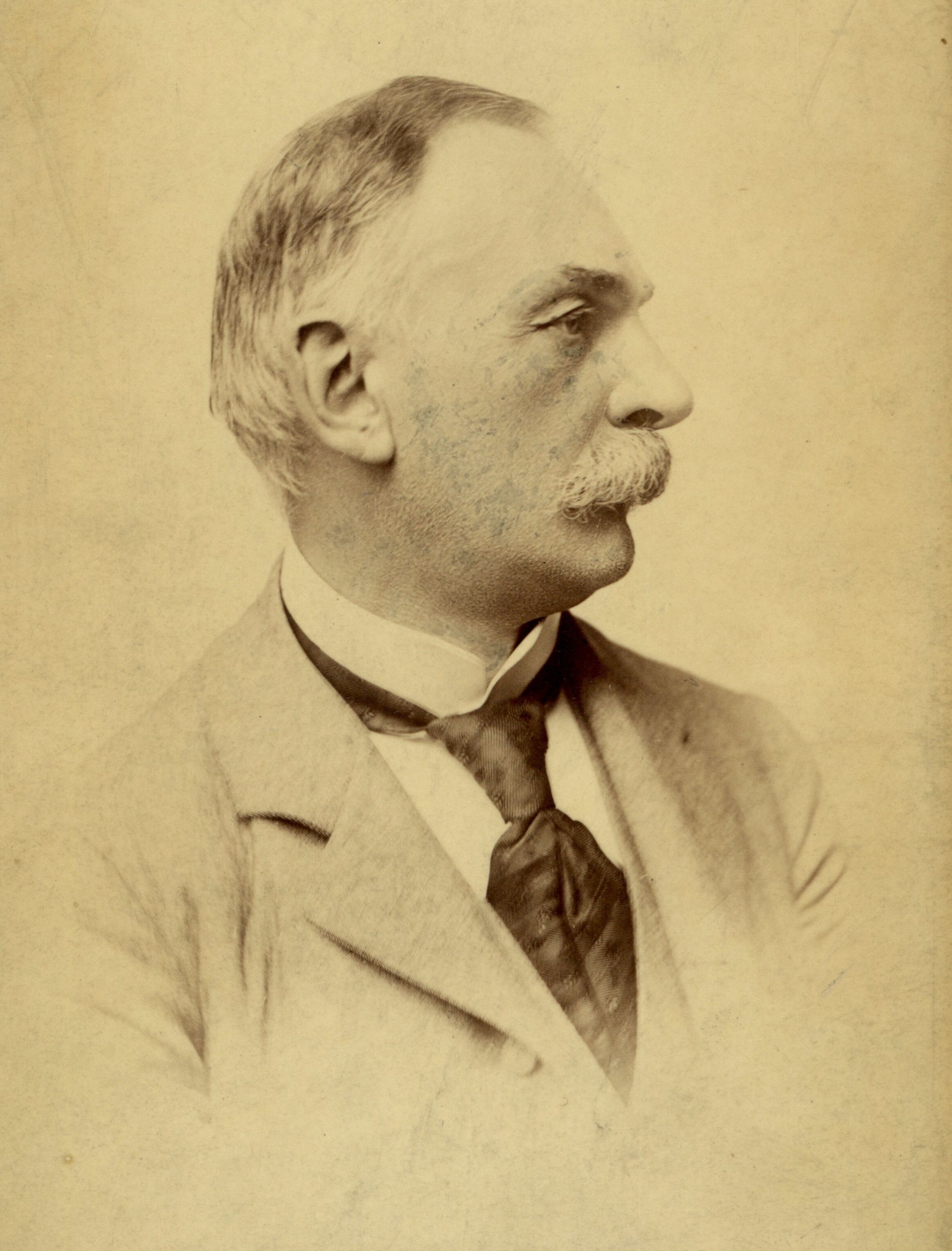

Background information
- Born: July 6, 1837
- Died: January 23, 1921 (aged 83)
- Genre: Classical
- Occupation: Composer
- Instrument: Piano

Władysław Marcjan Mikołaj Żeleński (6 July 1837 – 23 January 1921) was a Polish composer, pianist and organist.

== Life ==
Żeleński was born in Grodkowice into a landowner family. When he was eight, his father was killed and his mother critically injured in the rabacja, the Galician peasants' uprising of 1846.

He was a representative of neoromanticism in Polish music. From early on, Żeleński showed interest in chamber music. While in secondary school, he wrote two quartets and a trio that, however, have not survived to our times. Later chamber pieces include: Sextet in C major, Op. 9 and Wariacje na temat własny (Variations on an Original Theme) for string quartet, Op. 21. Żeleński composed while studying first in Prague and later in Paris. He died in Kraków.

Władysław was the father of physician and writer Tadeusz Boy-Żeleński. His students included Polish composer and pianist Jadwiga Sarnecka.

== Notable works ==
Operas

- Konrad Wallenrod (1885)
- Goplana (1896)
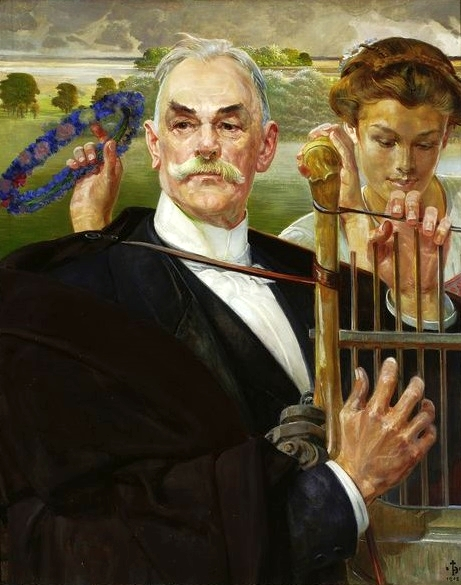
  Portrait of Władysław Żeleński (1908) by Jacek Malczewski
- Janek (1900)
- Stara baśń (opera) (1907) libretto by Aleksander Bandrowski based on Stara baśń

Symphonic compositions

- W Tatrach (In the Tatra Mountains), overture, Op. 27 (1870)
- Echa leśne (Forest Echos), overture
- Suita tańców polskich (Suite of Polish Dances), Op. 47
- Symfonie lesne (Spring Symphony), Op. 41
- Polonez koncertowy (Concert Polonaise)
- Trauerklänge, Elegisches Andante, Op. 36

Concertante

- Concerto E-flat major for piano and orchestra, Op. 60
- Romance for cello and orchestra, Op. 40

Chamber music

- Piano Quartet in C minor, Op. 61
- Piano Trio in E major for piano, violin, and cello, Op. 22 (1874, dedicated to pianist Augusta Auspitz-Kolar, published by Kahnt Verlag in Leipzig)
- Romance for violin and piano, Op. 16
- Sonata in F major for violin and piano, Op. 30
- String Quartet in F major, Op. 28
- String Quartet in A major, Op. 42
- Wariacje na temat własny (Variations on an Original Theme) for string quartet, Op. 21 (1883)

Keyboard

- 2 Mazurkas for piano, Op. 31
- 25 Preludes for organ, Op. 38
- Marsz uroczysty (Ceremonial March) for piano, Op. 44
- Rêverie for piano, Op. 48

Songs Władysław is author of over 100 songs, most notable are:

- "Na Anioł Pański"
- "Słowiczku mój"
- "Zaczarowana królewna"

== Discography ==
- 1998 : Organ Preludes – Acte Préalable AP0007
- 2000 : Songs – Acte Préalable AP0291
- 2005 : Violin Sonata – Acte Préalable AP0112
- 2015 : Piano Works vol. 1 – Acte Préalable AP0124
- 2011 : String Quartets – Acte Préalable AP0236
- 2011 : Chamber Music – Acte Préalable AP0237
- 2011 : Piano Works vol. 2 – Acte Préalable AP0238
- 2012 : Complete Works for Violin – Acte Préalable AP0239
- 2013 : Chamber Music with Piano – Acte Préalable AP0277
- 2015 : Songs – Acte Préalable AP0318
- 2016 : Secular Choral Works – Acte Préalable AP0363
- 2017 : Sacred Choral Works – Acte Préalable AP0374
- 2017 : Songs, Duets – Acte Préalable AP0384
- 2021 : Władysław Żeleński & Gustaw Roguski - Recently Discovered Works – Acte Préalable AP0480
- 2021 : Żeleński: Chamber Works – Trio Lontano - Dux 1735

== See also ==
- List of Poles
