= National symbols of Portugal =

The symbols of Portugal are official and unofficial flags, icons or cultural expressions that are emblematic, representative or otherwise characteristic of Portugal and of its culture.

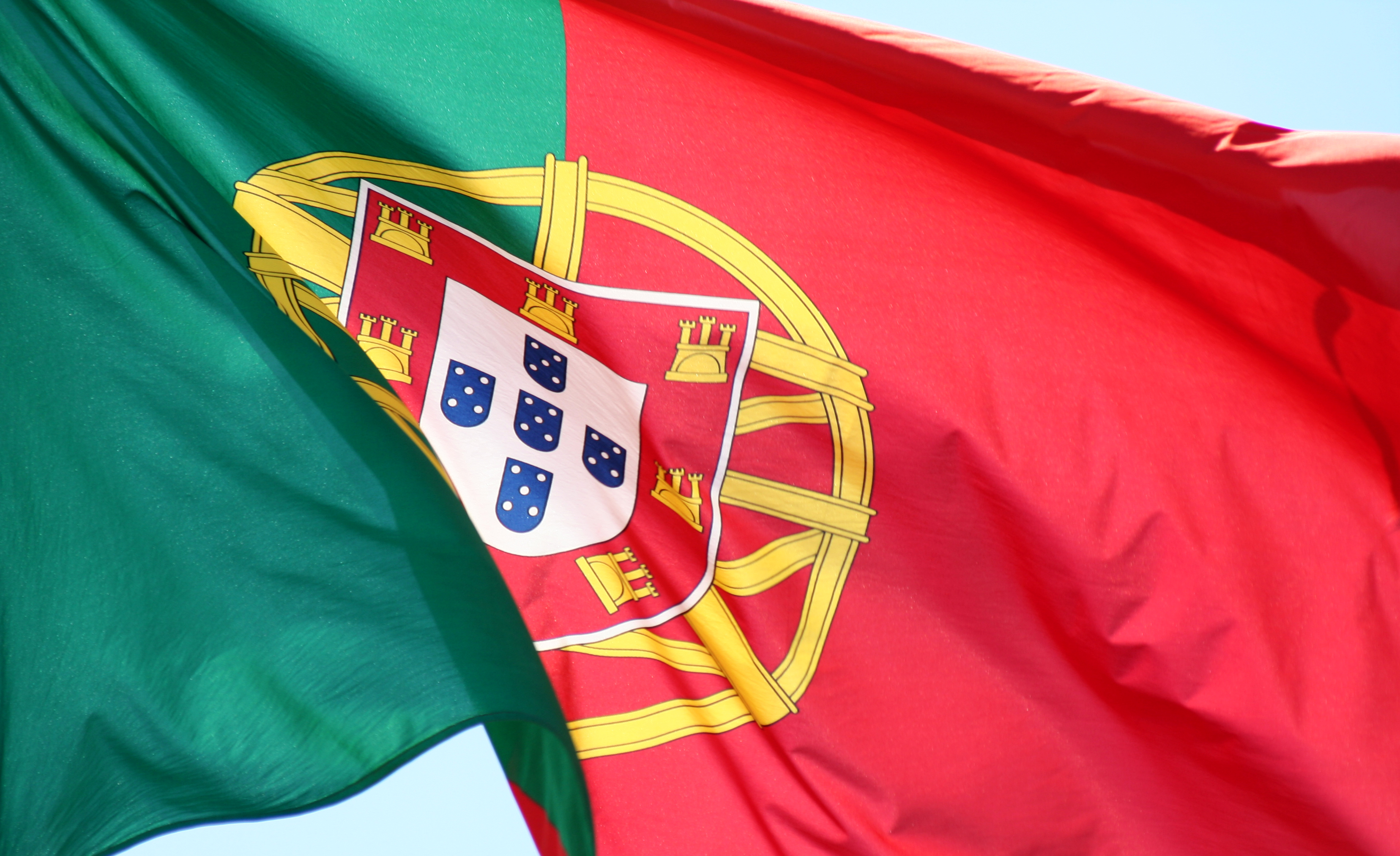
The Flag of Portugal

== Vexillology ==
The present national flag of Portugal was introduced after the establishment of the republican regime in the 5 October 1910 Revolution. It is the latest in a series of national flags since the 12th century. Since at least the 15th century, the flags of Portugal had been known as "Bandeira das Quinas" (Flag of the Quinas), the quina being each one of the five escutcheons of the Portuguese coat of arms that are the central motif of the flag. The present flag is also referred as the "Bandeira Verde-Rubra" (Green-Red Flag). The present flag model was approved by the Provisional Government of the Portuguese Republic on 29 November 1910 and confirmed by the National Constituent Assembly through a Decree of 19 June 1911. The regulation of this decree – with the design specifications of the national flag, military colours, naval jack and commissioning pennant – was published in the Diário do Governo (official journal) on 30 June 1911. The national flag was constitutionally confirmed as a national symbol in the Portuguese Constitution of 1976.
The national colours are the portable flags used by certain military, police and fire brigade units in formations, parades and other ceremonies. The colours used to be referred as the "regimental flag" and now are referred as the "national standard". The members of the Armed Forces make their oath of allegiance before the national colours. The national military colours of Portugal general model was established at the same time as the national flag. Despite the existence of a general model, each branch of the Armed Forces established their own model of colours.
The national jack is a variant of the national flag hosted at the bow of warships when they are anchored. The present model of the jack was established at the same time as the national flag.
The commissioning pennant is a long pennant hosted in the top of the main mast of warships which are commanded by officers. As Portugal does not have a separate war ensign, the commissioning pennant serves as the sign that a ship is a warship. The present model of the commissioning pennant was established at the same time as the national flag.
The national cockade of Portugal is red and green, with this last color occupying the center. In the past, the cockade was one of the most important national symbols, being used by the military, police and some other public employees in their uniform headdresses and also by many civilians to show their patriotism. For a while, the cockade served also as the roundel of the Portuguese military aircraft, later being replaced by the cross of the Order of Christ. However, today, the cockade is rarely used and largely forgotten, despite still being used in the famous shako (barretina) of the dress uniform of the Military College.

== Heraldry ==
The present model of the coat of arms of Portugal was established at the same time as the national flag, being approved by the Provisional Government of the Portuguese Republic on 29 November 1910, with its specifications being formalized on 30 June 1911. Three versions of the coat of arms were established. The basic version, intended to be included in the national flag, consists of the traditional Portuguese shield laid over a golden armillary sphere. The version to be used in coins and emblems consists of the basic version surrounded by two olive branches, tied in the bottom by a ribbon (usually represented in green and red). The third version, intended to be included in the national colours of the military units, is similar to the previous one, but the ribbon is white with the wording Esta é a ditosa Pátria minha amada (this is my famous loved Fatherland).
The Portuguese shield is the result of centuries of modifications and alterations. Starting with the Count Henry of Portugal's blue cross on a silver field shield, successive elements were added or taken, culminating with the complex heraldic design that was officially adopted in 1481 and kept until today. The shield consist of the five quinas (blue escutcheons with five besants) over an argent field and a red burdure charged with gold castles (fixed in seven since the end of 16th century). The complete achievement of arms, adopted in 1911, include the Portuguese shield over the armillary sphere
The armillary sphere was initially the personal badge of the future king Manuel I of Portugal, still when he was duke of Beja and great master of the Order of Christ. It became a national symbol when Manuel become king of Portugal, being associated with the Portuguese Discoveries and specially used to represent the Portuguese Empire. The coat of arms of Portugal adopted in 1911 has the armillary sphere as one of its main elements.
The cross of the Order of Christ (frequently referred simply as the cross of Christ) has been a national emblem since the reign of Manuel I, former great master of the Order. Despite not being one of the elements of the coat of arms of Portugal, it is extensively used as a national symbol. Namely, it was used in the sails of the ships of the Portuguese Discoveries and is still used today in the sails of the Portuguese Navy's school ship Sagres, in the Portuguese Air Force's aircraft roundels and in the badges of several Portuguese national sports teams.

== Anthems ==
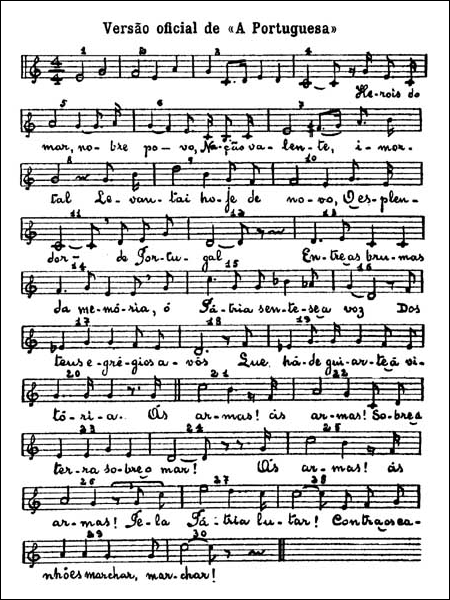
Official 1957 A Portuguesa version music sheet,

A Portuguesa (The Portuguese) is the national anthem of Portugal.

It was composed by Alfredo Keil and written by Henrique Lopes de Mendonça during the resurgent nationalist movement ignited by the 1890 British Ultimatum to Portugal concerning its African colonies. Used as the marching song of the failed republican rebellion of January 1891, in Porto, it was adopted as the national anthem of the newborn Portuguese Republic in 1911, replacing the Hino da Carta (Charter Anthem) which was the Portuguese national anthem during the period of the deposed constitutional monarchy. The Hino da Carta had in turn replaced in 1834, the Hino Patriótico (Patriotic Anthem), used until then as a semi-official national anthem.

The current official version of the A Portuguesa was approved by the Portuguese Council of Ministers on 16 July 1957.

The A Portuguesa was constitutionally confirmed as a national symbol in the Portuguese Constitution of 1976.

Portugal has also a secondary official anthem, which is the Maria da Fonte anthem. This anthem is used in certain occasions – during military and civic ceremonies – when the A Portuguesa does not apply, namely, serving as honors music to the Speaker of the Parliament, the Prime Minister and Cabinet, the President of the Supreme Court of Justice and the military heads of the Armed Forces, Navy, Army and Air Force.

== Cultural ==
- Belém Tower is a fortified tower located in the civil parish of Belém in Lisbon. The tower was built in the early 16th century and is a prominent example of the Portuguese Manueline style. By its characteristics, it is one of the most distinctive monuments of the world and thus considered an icon of Portugal.
- Os Lusíadas is an epic poem written by Camões in the 16th century. It is regarded as Portugal's national epic.
- Fado (destiny, fate) is a mainly melancholic music genre which can be traced to the 1820s in Portugal, but probably with much earlier origins. There are two main varieties: the Lisbon fado and the Coimbra fado. It is considered the national music genre of Portugal, with Amália Rodrigues (1920–1999) its "queen".
- The Calçada portuguesa (Portuguese pavement) is a traditional style pavement used for many pedestrian areas in Portugal and can also be found throughout former Portuguese colonies such as Brazil and Macau.
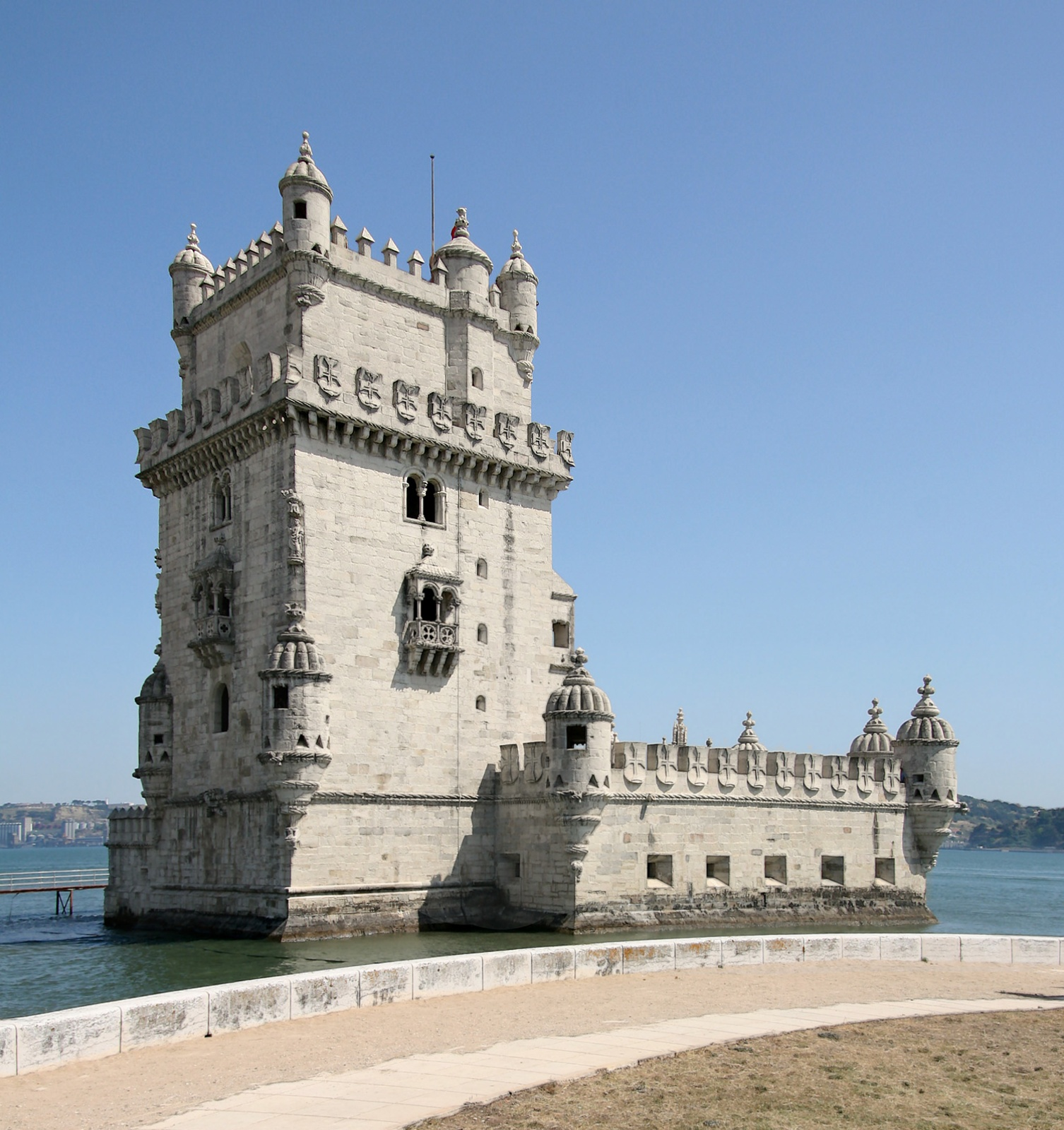
The ornate bastions and tower of the Belém Tower, iconic symbol of Lisbon and defensive bulwark on the Tagus River

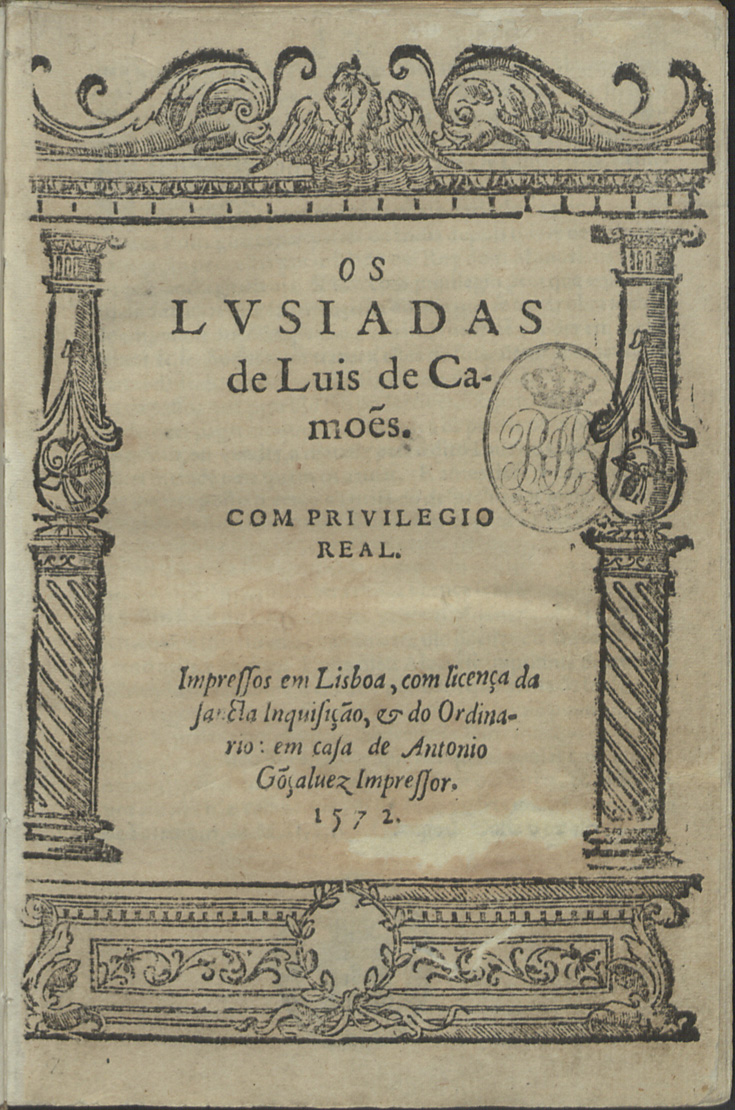
Cover of the first edition of Os Lusíadas

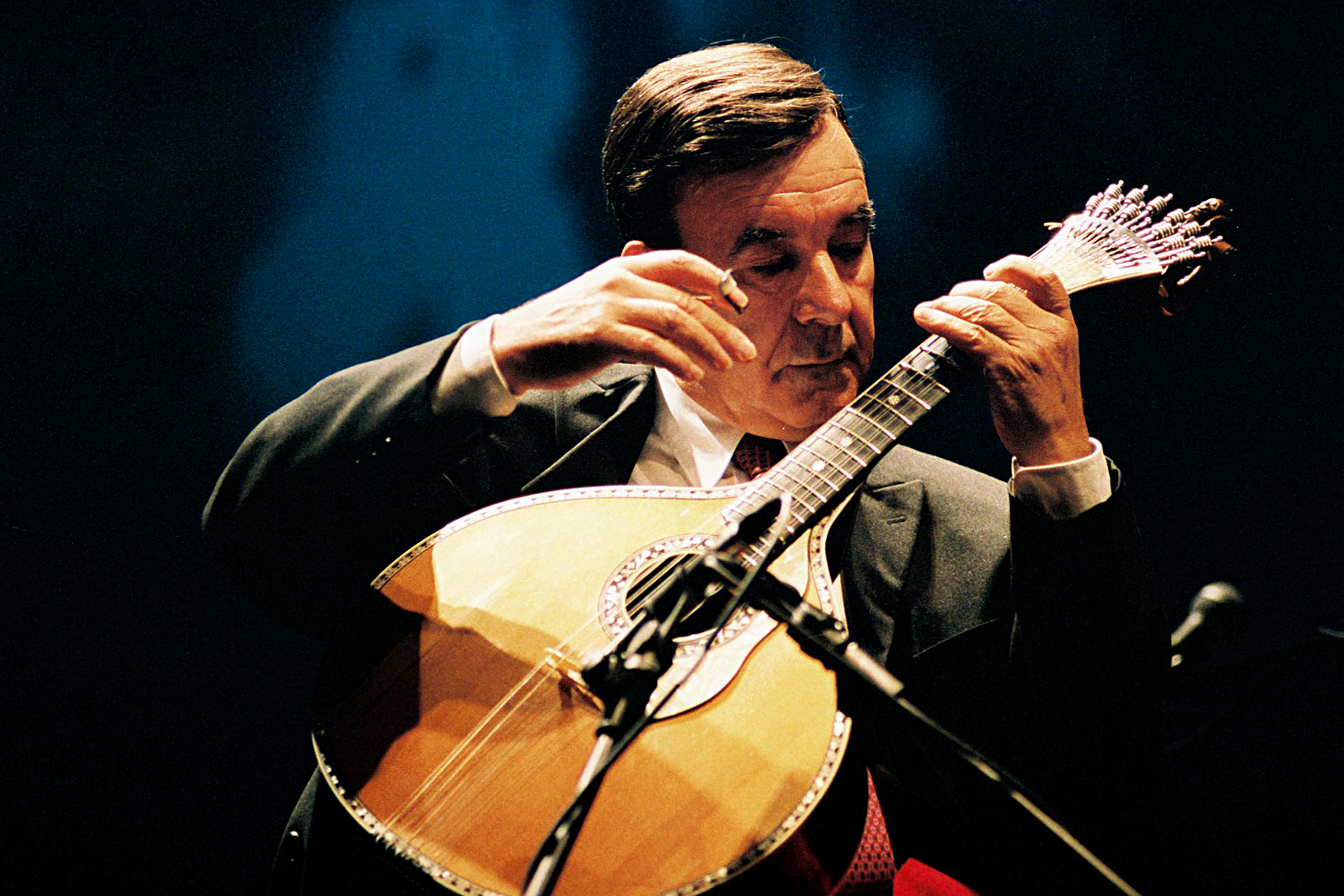
The Portuguese guitar most notable for its use in the traditional Portuguese fado music

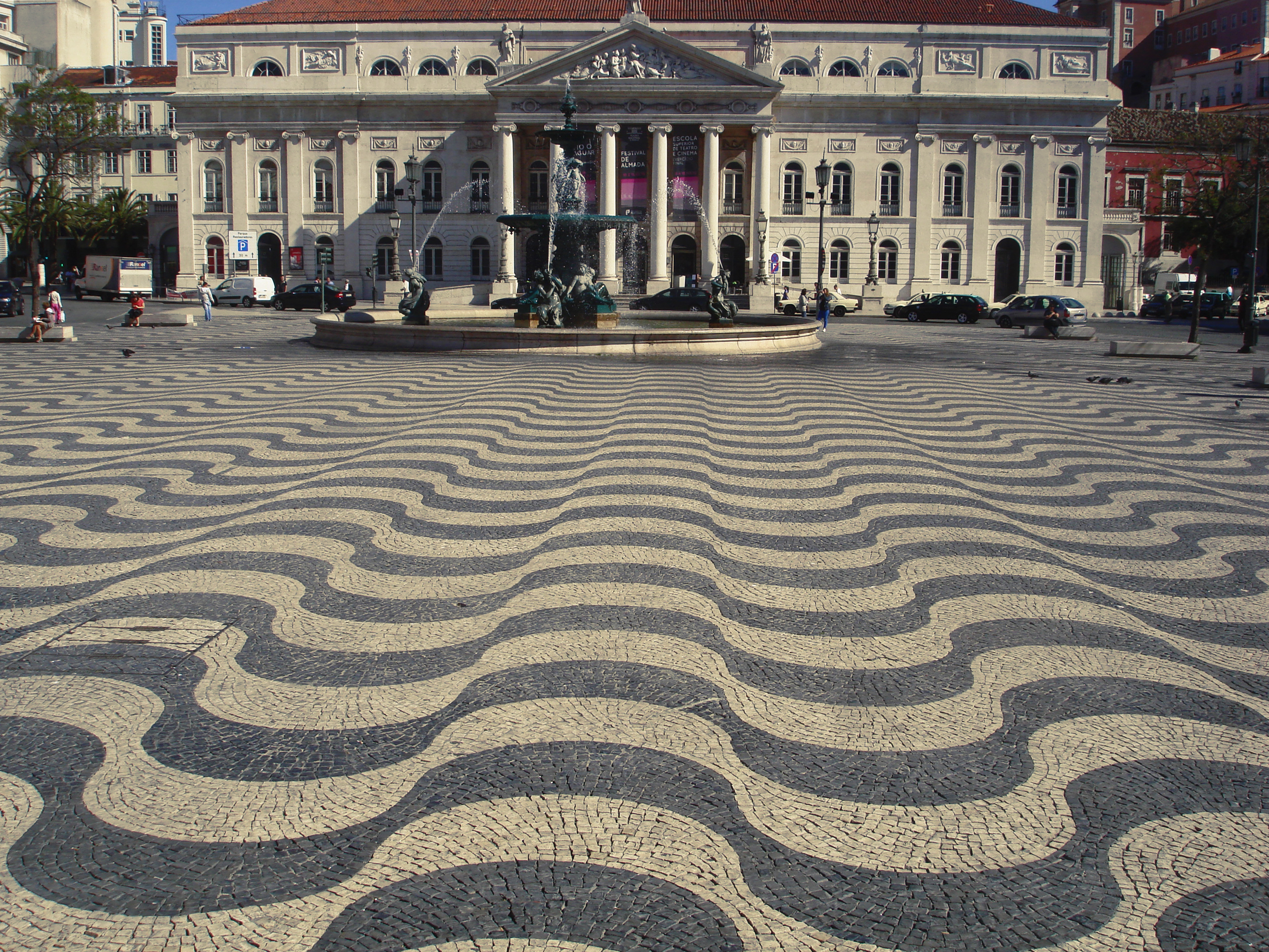
Portuguese pavement on Rossio Square, Lisbon

== Flora and fauna ==
- The Quercus suber, commonly called the cork oak, is a medium-sized, evergreen oak tree in the section Quercus sect. Cerris. Traditionally, it is the primary source of cork for wine bottle stoppers, as well as for other uses, such as cork flooring. Cork is now used in a number of untraditional applications like shoes, cloths, fashion accessories, construction, sports equipment and even in spaceship components. The quercus suber holds great importance in the economy of Portugal, especially the southern regions, the country being the largest producer of cork. In December 2011, after a petition signed by thousands of citizens, the Quercus suber was declared the national tree by the Portuguese Parliament.
- The Galo de Barcelos (Rooster of Barcelos) is one of the most common emblems of Portugal. These pieces of craftsmanship, made in painted clay in the city of Barcelos celebrate an old legend that tells the story of a dead rooster's miraculous intervention in proving the innocence of a man who had been falsely accused and sentenced to death.
- The wyvern was used as the crest of the royal arms of Portugal since the 15th century. Until the 17th century, the dragon was represented in gold, but from then on it became usually represented in green, probably because green was the national color of the kingdom during the early period of the House of Braganza's reign. Presently, among the common Portuguese, the dragon is usually associated as the mascot of the FC Porto football club, as the emblem of this club includes the old coat of arms of the city of Porto, which had the royal dragon as a crest, granted to it as an augmentation of honor in 1837.
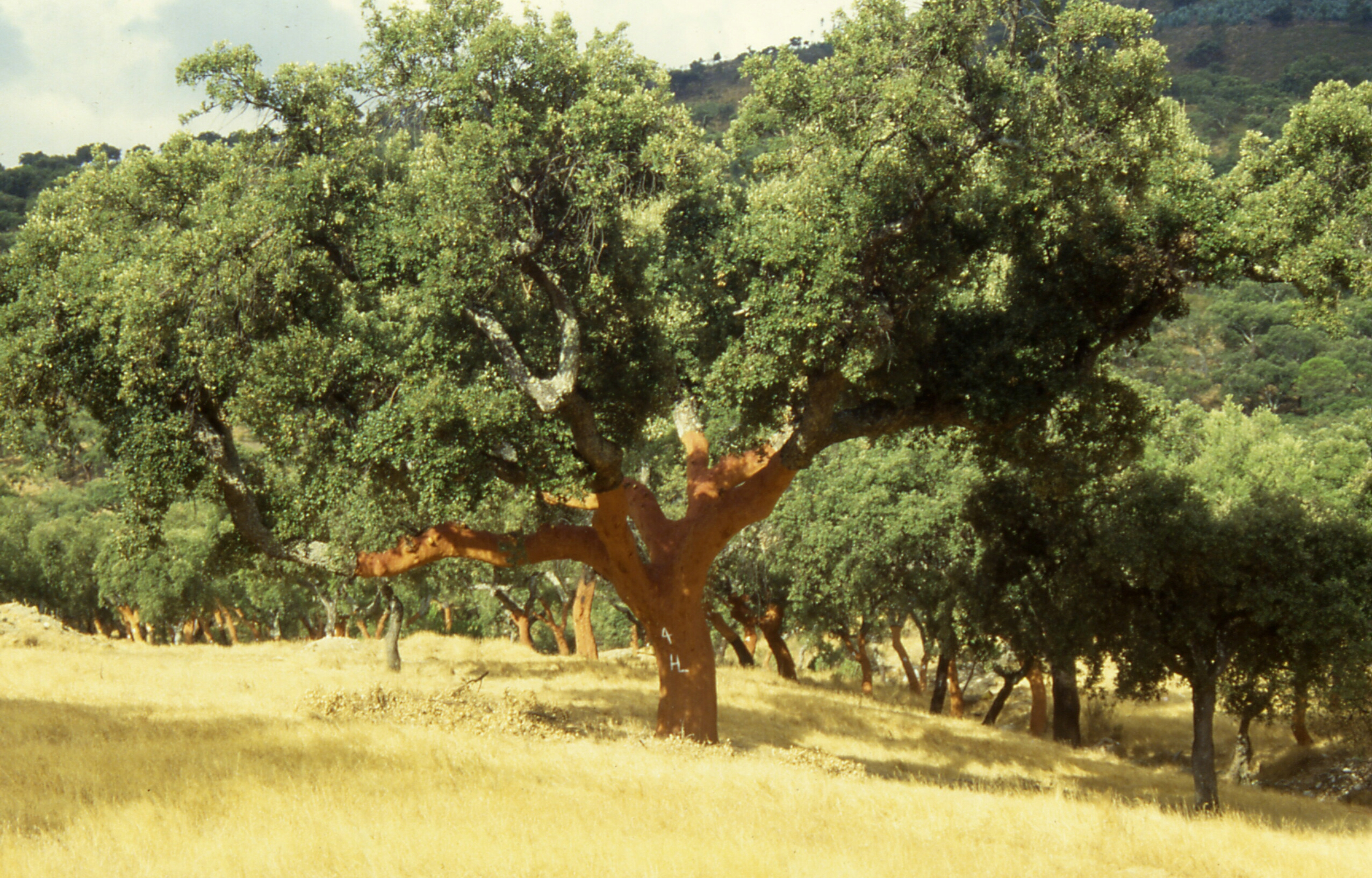
Cork oak (bot. Quercus suber), Portugal

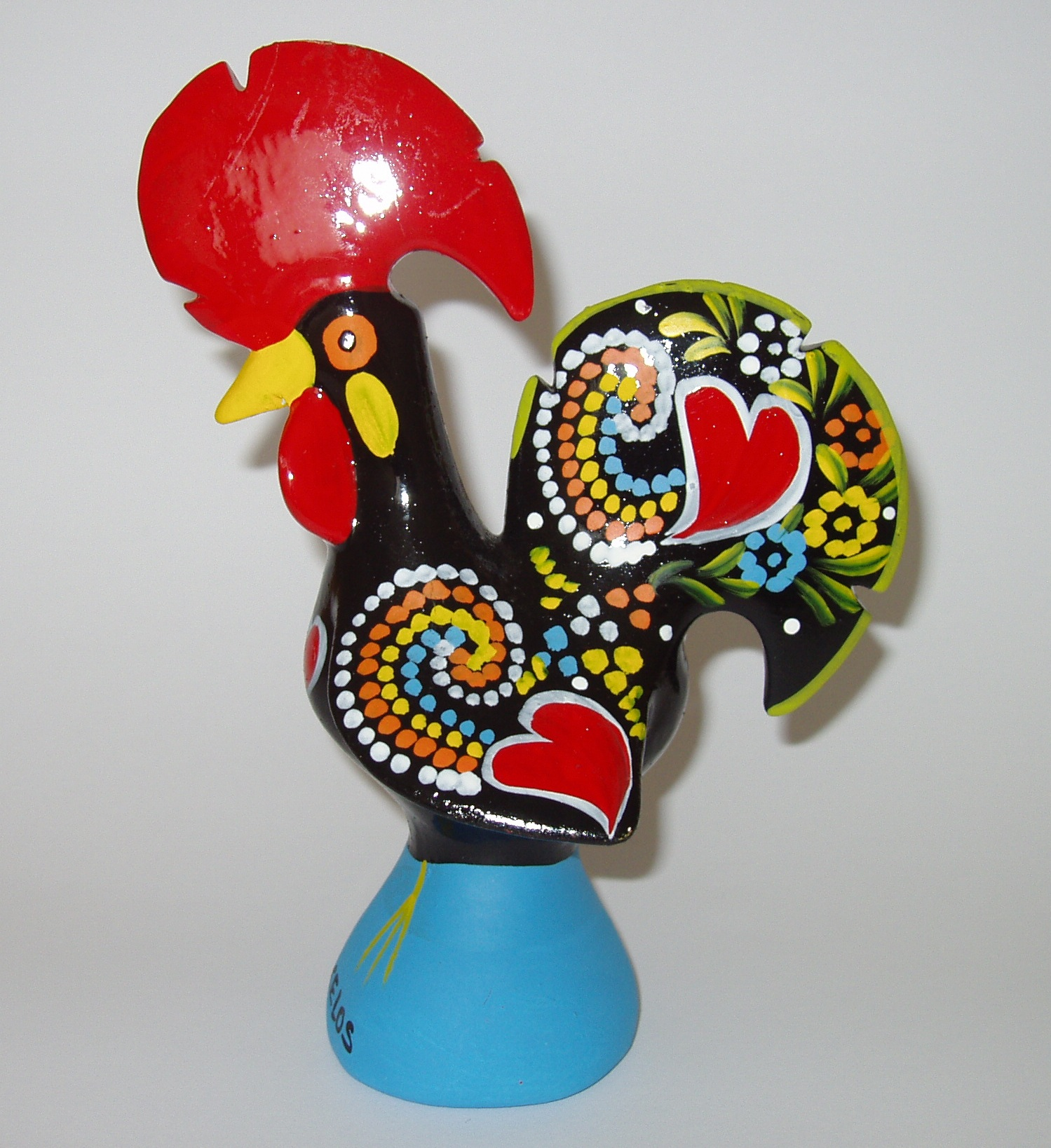
The legendary Galo de Barcelos is widespread as a souvenir of Portugal

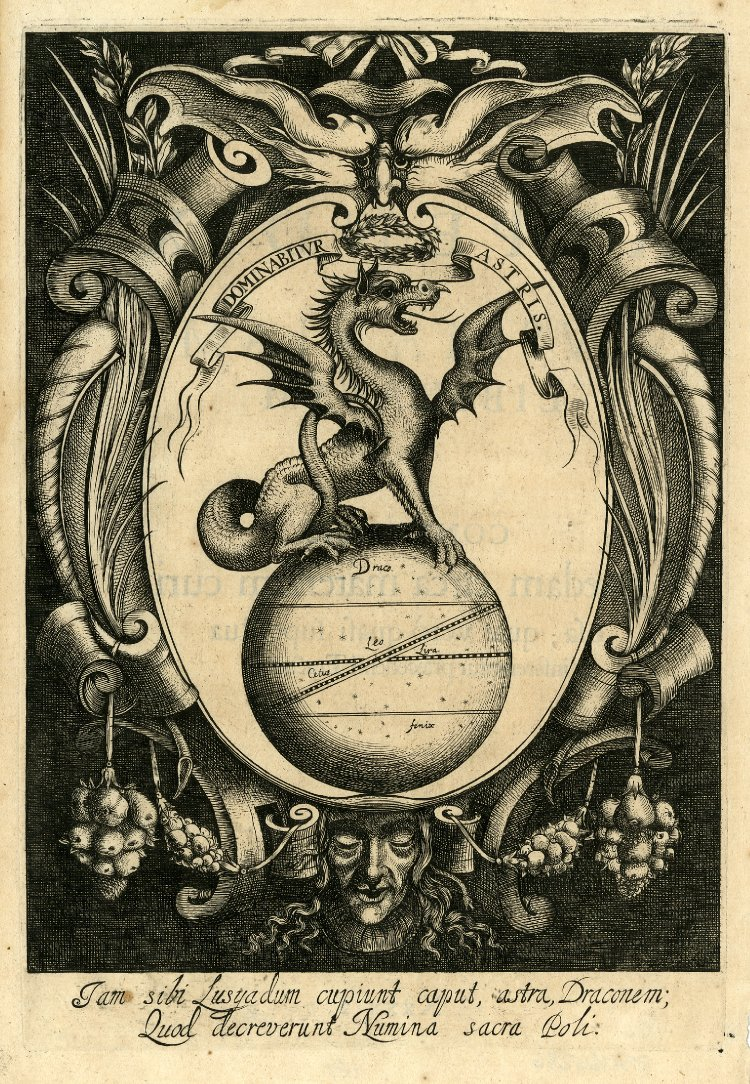
Dragon as personificatoon of Portugal in a 1640s book.

== Food and drink ==
- A pastel de nata is a Portuguese egg tart pastry, very popular in Portugal and the Lusosphere.
- The bacalhau (cod fish) is one of Portugal's most recognisable and traditional foods. There are said to be over 1000 recipes of bacalhau in Portugal.
- Port wine is a Portuguese fortified wine produced exclusively in the Douro Valley in the northern provinces of Portugal. It is typically a sweet, red wine, often served as a dessert wine though it also comes in dry, semi-dry, and white varieties.
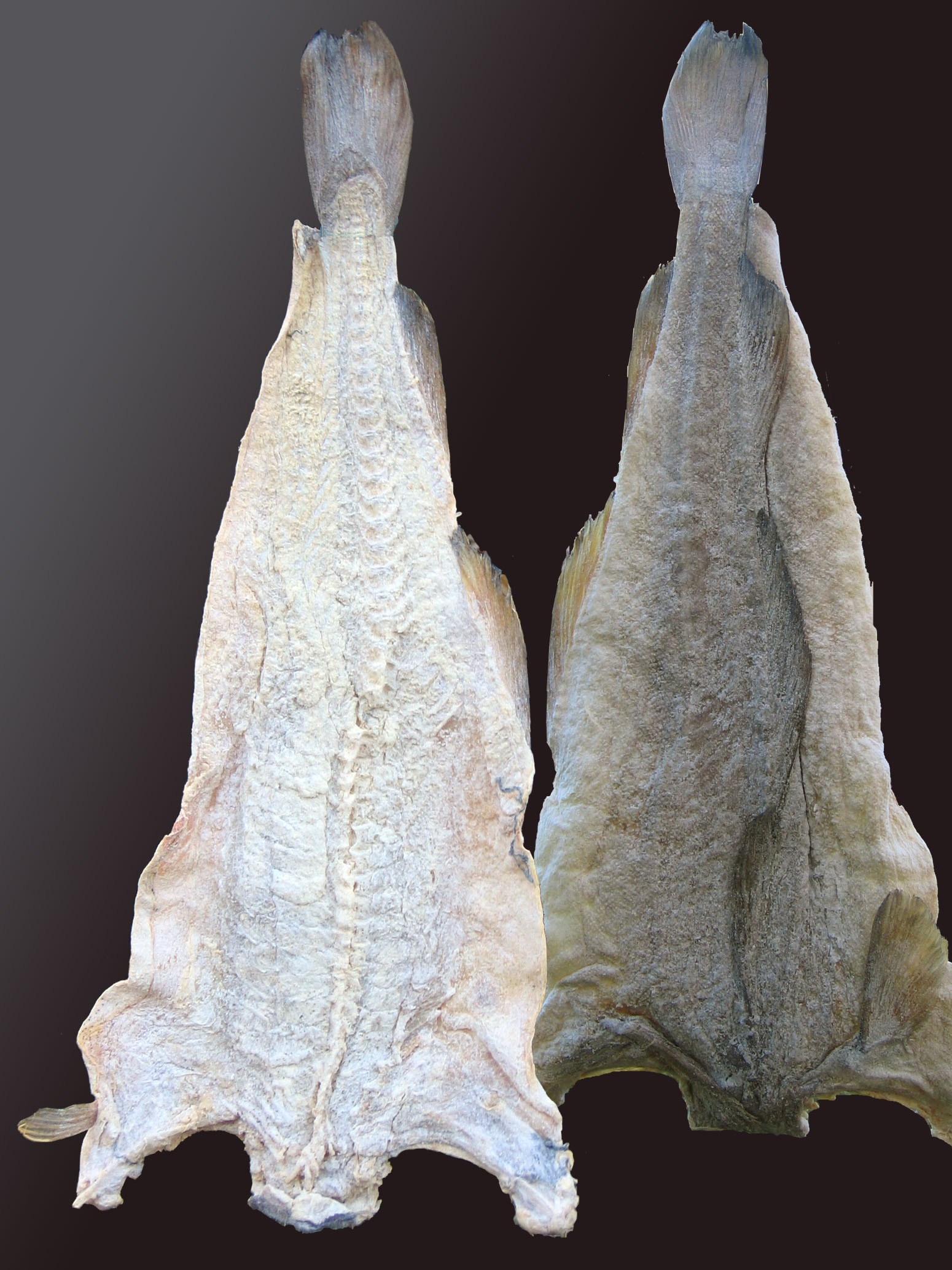
Bacalhau, Portuguese salted and dried cod

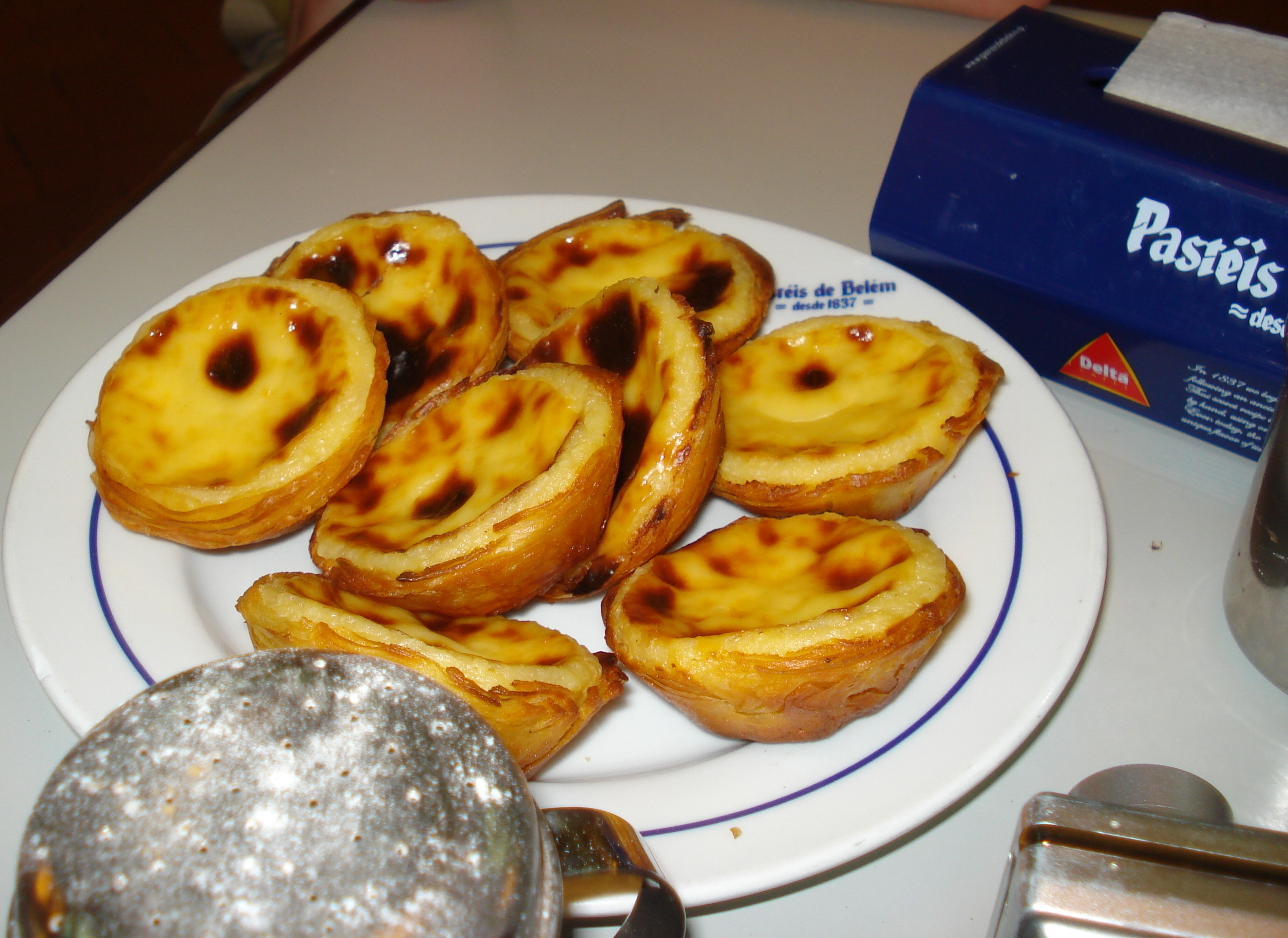
Pastéis de nata in the Pastelaria de Belém pastry shop, Lisbon

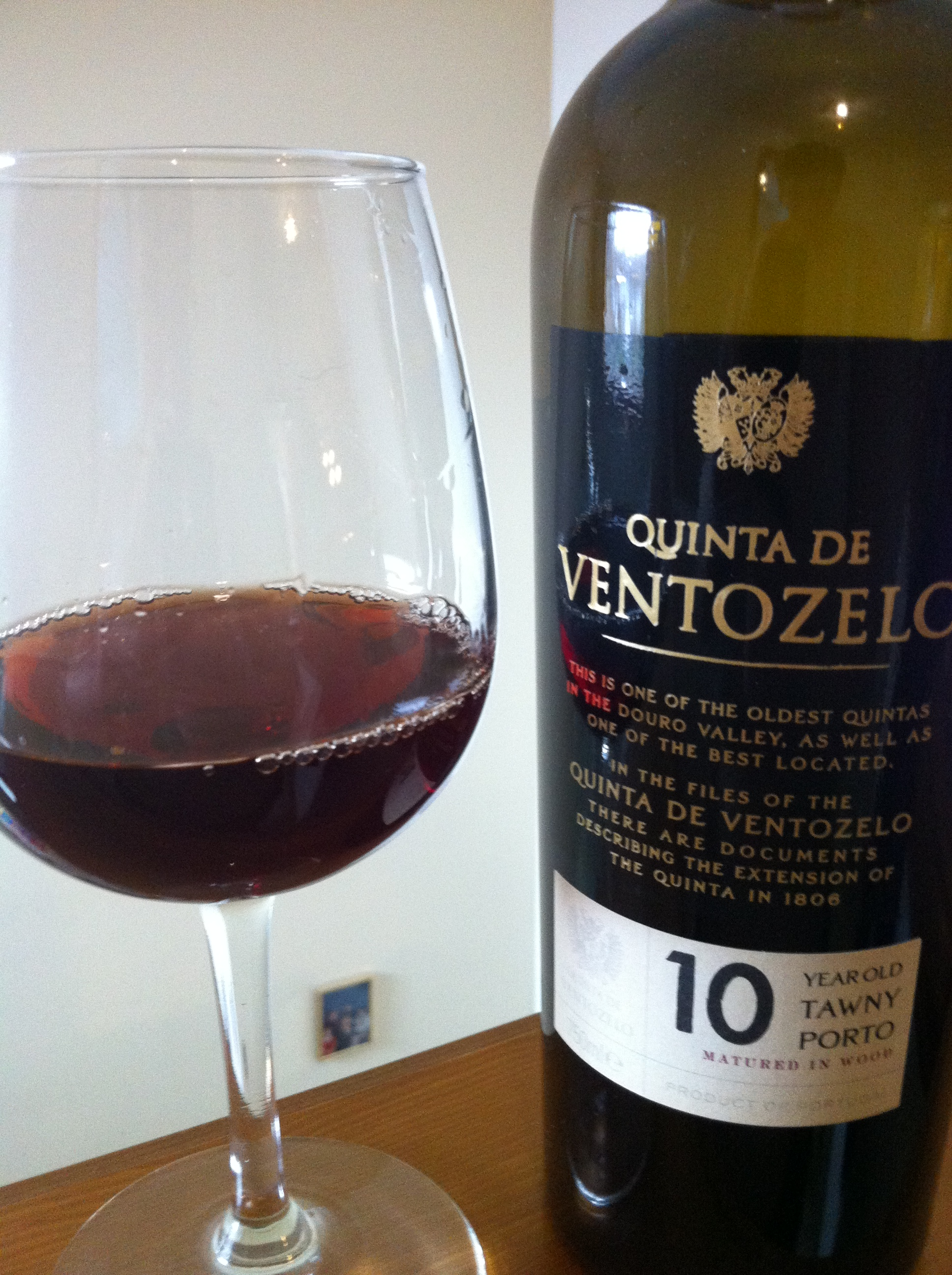
Port wine

== People ==
- Efígie da República is used as a national personification in Portugal, symbolizing the Republic.
- Luís de Camões is considered Portugal's and the Portuguese language's greatest poet. His date of death (10 June) is celebrated as Portugal Day.
- Zé Povinho is a Portuguese everyman created in 1875 by Rafael Bordalo Pinheiro. He became first a symbol of the Portuguese working-class people, and eventually into the unofficial personification of Portugal.
Efígie da República

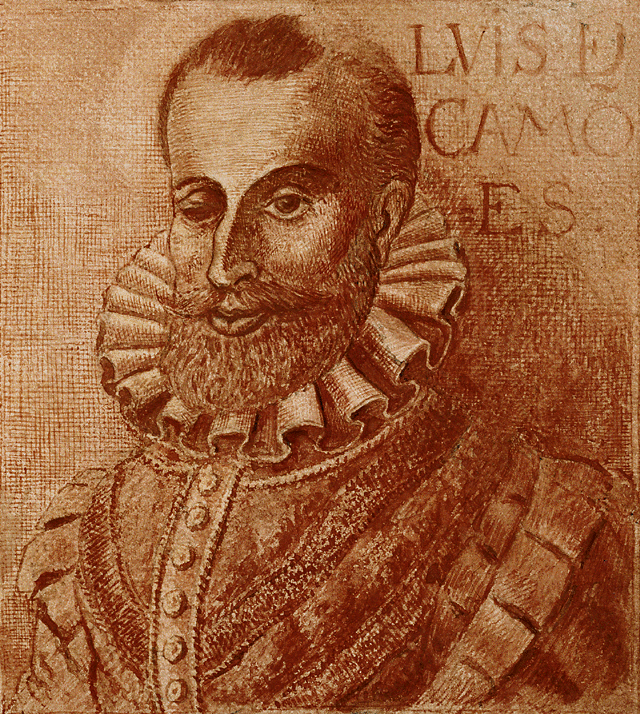
Portuguese poet Luís de Camões

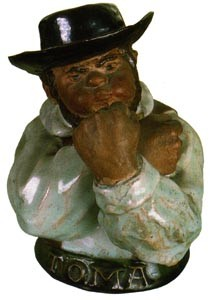
Zé Povinho in Caldas da Rainha porcelain

== See also ==
- List of national monuments of Portugal
