= National Anthem of Macau =

Throughout the history of Macau, the national anthem of the sovereign state has always been adopted for official occasions, such as circumstances like sporting events or formal ceremonies.

The Anthem of Macau may refer to:

- "A Portuguesa", the national anthem of Portugal, used as the representative anthem of Portuguese Macau (1557–1999)
- "March of the Volunteers", the national anthem of China, used as the representative anthem of the Macau SAR (1999–present)
