= Hymno Patriótico =

First national anthem of Portugal

Hino Patriótico
English: Patriotic Hymn
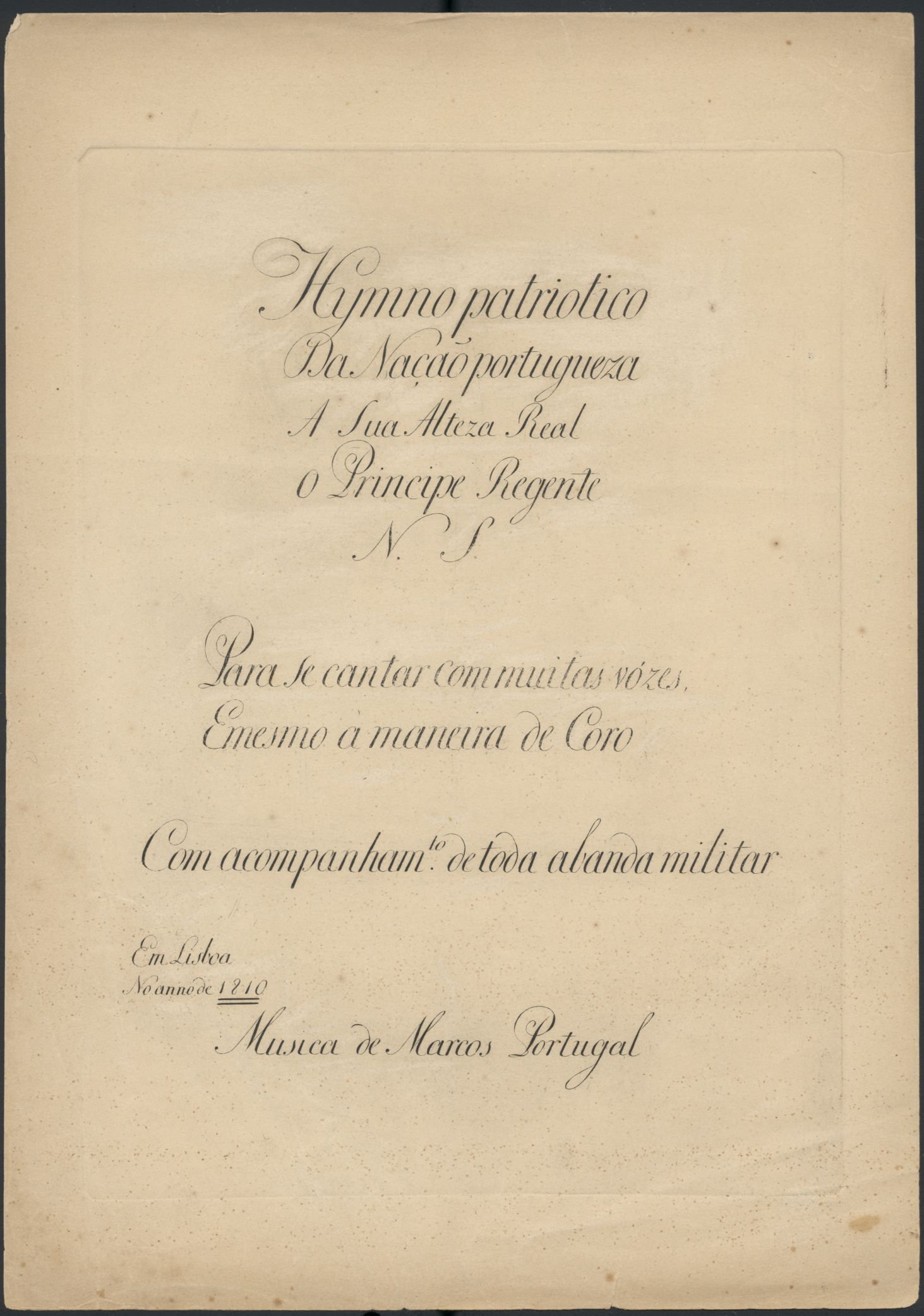
- National anthem of Portugal
- Music: Marcos Portugal, 1808
- Adopted: 13 May 1809
- Relinquished: May 1834
- Succeeded by: Hino da Carta

Audio sample
- Hymno Patriotico (Instrumental): file; help

The Hino Patriótico, fully Hino Patriótico da Nação Portuguesa, (Note: Archaic orthography: Hymno Patriotico da Nação Portugueza; English: "Patriotic Hymn of the Portuguese Nation") is considered Portugal's first national anthem. Marcos Portugal, who had remained living in Portugal, had, in 1808, initially named the piece as 'the Prince's Hymn' (D. João VI Hymn). With this dedication, it was offered to the Prince-Regent John and first performed for him in Brazil in 1809. The anthem was inspired by the cantata "La Speranza o sia l'Augurio Felice". The lyrics changed several times, altered by contemporary events, until settling into a more or less permanent form in 1821.

It was a particularly popular tune with the Portuguese troops of Wellington's Peninsular Army, where it was known by the final verse of the chorus, "Vencer ou Morrer" ("To Win or To Die"). Wellington's Advocate General, Seymour Larpent, noted in his diary on 9 June 1813: "The Portuguese are in the highest order, the men really look at least equal to ours, better than some […] the infantry and the Caçadores in particular. The whole army marches very fresh hitherto, but the Portuguese in particular; they come in, even to the last mile, singing along the road." "I have heard it boldly played in the teeth of the enemy by the Portuguese bands […] It made all Portuguese hearts pant for the fight […] and as the voices joined the music, Vencer o morir [sic] was not sung without meaning."

After Prince Peter became King Peter IV and provided a new constitution, the song "Hymno da Carta" became more commonly used as a national anthem, and the latter was officially decreed as such in 1834.

== Lyrics ==
Portuguese lyrics	Translation
Hymno Patriotico	Patriotic Hymn
Eis, Príncipe excelso, (Note: Also sung as Eis, oh Rei Excelso after Prince John ascended the throne as King John VI. Translation: Oh, most Excellent King); Os votos sagrados, Que os Lusos honrados, (Note: Q'os Lusos honrados is also sung.); Vêm livres fazer.	Behold, highest Prince, The sacred vows, The Honoured Lusitanians, Come freely to make.
Por vós, pela pátria, O sangue daremos, Por glória só temos: Vencer ou morrer.	For thee, and for the homeland, We shall give our blood, For glory we have but: To win or to die.
Cruel inimigo Debalde se avança; De Afonso a herança Eterna há-de ser.	Cruel enemy, Your advance is in vain; Afonso’s legacy Forever shall endure.
Por vós, pela pátria, O sangue daremos, Por glória só temos: Vencer ou morrer.	For thee, and for the homeland, We shall give our blood, For glory we have but: To win or to die.
Da guerra os horrores, As perdas, os danos, Fieis lusitanos Não sabem temer.	The horrors of war, The losses, the damages, Faithful Lusitanians; Know not how to fear.
Por vós, pela pátria, O sangue daremos, Por glória só temos: Vencer ou morrer.	For thee, and for the homeland, We shall give our blood, For glory we have but: To win or to die.
Aos mares vos destes, A bem dos vassalos, Julgando livral-os De ímpio poder	To the seas you ventured, For the sake of your vassals, Seeking to deliver them From an impious power
Por vós, pela pátria, O sangue daremos, Por glória só temos: Vencer ou morrer.	For thee, and for the homeland, We shall give our blood, For glory we have but: To win or to die.
Mal grado o tyranno, Em breve vireis, Os Lusos fieis, Vós mesmo reger.	Despite of the tyrant, You will come soon, The faithful Lusos, You rule yourself.
Por vós, pela pátria, O sangue daremos, Por glória só temos: Vencer ou morrer.	For thee, and for the homeland, We shall give our blood, For glory we have but: To win or to die.
Um Deus vos escude, O' Príncipe Caro: Deus é nosso amparo, Não há que temer.	May God protect you, O dear Prince: God is our support, There is nothing to fear.
Por vós, pela pátria, O sangue daremos, Por glória só temos: Vencer ou morrer.	For thee, and for the homeland, We shall give our blood, For glory we have but: To win or to die.

== See also ==
- Hino da Carta
- A Portuguesa
