= A Portuguesa =

National anthem of Portugal

English: 'The Portuguese'
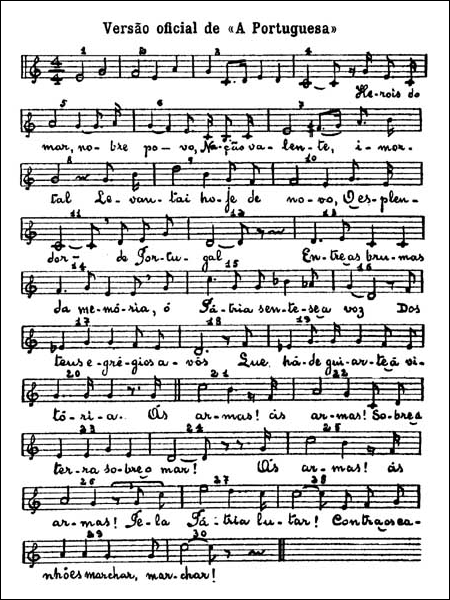
- Music sheet c. 1957
- National anthem of Portugal
- Lyrics: Henrique Lopes de Mendonça, 1890
- Music: Alfredo Keil, 1890
- Adopted: 5 October 1910

U.S. Navy Band instrumental version

"A Portuguesa" (Note: pronounced [ɐ puɾtuˈɣezɐ]; lit. 'The Portuguese') is the national anthem of Portugal. It was composed by Alfredo Keil and written by Henrique Lopes de Mendonça during the resurgent nationalist movement ignited by the 1890 British Ultimatum to Portugal concerning its African colonies. Used as the marching song of the failed republican revolt of 31 January 1891, in Porto, it was adopted as the national anthem of the newborn Portuguese Republic in 1911, replacing "Hino da Carta", the anthem of the deposed constitutional monarchy.

== History ==
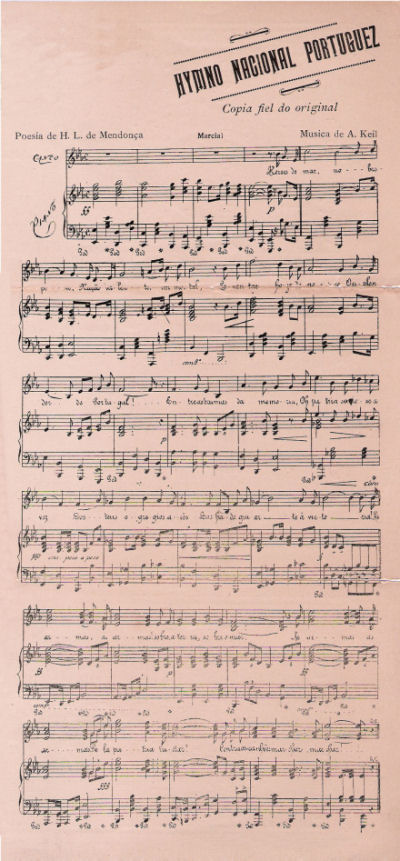
1890 sheet music

On 11 January 1890, the United Kingdom issued an ultimatum demanding that Portugal refrain from colonizing land lying between the Portuguese colonies of Angola, on the west coast of Africa, and Mozambique, on the east coast, thereby forming one contiguous polity (as proposed on the Rose-coloured Map). Despite a popular uproar, the Portuguese government accepted their demands. This contributed to the unpopularity of King Carlos I and the monarchy, and it garnered support for the increasingly popular republican movement in Portugal.

The night after the ultimatum was accepted, composer Alfredo Keil, at the suggestion of a group of friends that included Rafael Bordalo Pinheiro and Teófilo Braga, wrote the melody for "A Portuguesa" as a patriotic protest march. Inspired by the outrage felt by the Portuguese people, the lyricist, Henrique Lopes de Mendonça, accepted Keil's request to create words to suit his melody. Mendonça said "A Portuguesa" was a song "in which the fatherland's wounded soul would merge with its ambitions of freedom and revival"; he hoped it would be an anthem, embraced by the people, that could express their yearning for national vindication. Such expressions are epitomized by "La Marseillaise", the Portuguese fado, and "Hino da Maria da Fonte". The march was quickly disseminated; several thousands of copies of the sheet music were freely distributed, together with fliers and posters. The song's popularity also spread across national borders, and verses were translated into other languages. It was first performed by an orchestra in early 1890 in the parish of Dornes, under the direction of Keil himself.

On several stages in Lisbon, "A Portuguesa" drew special attention. On 29 March 1890, the march was performed at the Great Patriotic Concert, held at the Teatro Nacional de São Carlos (Saint Charles National Theatre), as well as at every other theatre in the capital. Beyond its use in cultural displays, "A Portuguesa" was also exploited for commercial gain. Several food products, including canned sardines and cookies, were named for this song.

However, the song was perceived as a political weapon, and it was soon converted into a republican hymn. This political co-option of the theme's original meaning forced both authors to disavow this vision and stress its purely non-partisan sentiments. On 31 January 1891, a republican rebellion broke out in the northern city of Porto and "A Portuguesa" was adopted by the rebels as their marching song. The rebellion was crushed, and the song was banned. However, it was never forgotten, and, on 5 October 1910, a new and stronger rebellion developed as "A Portuguesa" played in the background. A year later, the first session of the Constituent Assembly officially proclaimed it as the national anthem.

In 1956, the emergence of melodic variants of the anthem forced the government to create a committee whose aim was to define an official version. On 16 July 1957, the current version was proposed, and it was approved by the Council of Ministers.

== Lyrics ==
The anthem's official version consists of the first verse and the chorus from Mendonça's poem.

Portuguese original

I
Heróis do mar, nobre povo,
Nação valente, imortal,
Levantai hoje de novo
O esplendor de Portugal!
Entre as brumas da memória,
Ó Pátria, sente-se a voz
Dos teus egrégios avós,
Que há-de guiar-te à vitória!

Coro:
Às armas, às armas!
Sobre a terra, sobre o mar,
Às armas, às armas!
Pela Pátria lutar!
Contra os canhões, marchar, marchar!

II
Desfralda a invicta Bandeira,
À luz viva do teu céu!
Brade a Europa à terra inteira:
Portugal não pereceu
Beija o solo teu jucundo
O Oceano, a rugir d'amor,
E teu braço vencedor
Deu mundos novos ao Mundo!

Coro

III
Saudai o Sol que desponta
Sobre um ridente porvir;
Seja o eco de uma afronta
O sinal do ressurgir.
Raios dessa aurora forte
São como beijos de mãe,
Que nos guardam, nos sustêm,
Contra as injúrias da sorte.

Coro

IPA transcription (Note: See Help:IPA/Portuguese and Portuguese phonology.)

1
[e.ˈɾɔjʒ‿du maɾ ˈnɔ.βɾɨ ˈpo.vu]
[nɐ.ˈsɐ̃w̃ vɐ.ˈɫẽt(ɨ) i.muɾ.ˈtaɫ]
[ɫɨ.vɐ̃.ˈtaj ˈo.ʒɨ dɨ ˈno.vu]
[u‿(ɨ)ʃ.pɫẽ.ˈdoɾ dɨ puɾ.tu.ˈɣaɫ]
[ˈẽ.tɾ(i)‿ɐʒ‿ˈbɾu.mɐʒ‿dɐ mɨ.ˈmɔ.ɾjɐ]
[ɔ ˈpa.tɾjɐ ˈsẽ.tɨ si‿ɐ vɔʃ]
[duʃ tewz‿i.ˈɡrɛ.ʒjuz‿ɐ.ˈvɔʃ]
[ki‿ˈa.ðɨ ɡi.ˈaɾ.t(i)‿a vi.ˈtɔ.ɾjɐ]

[ˈko.ɾu]
[az‿ˈaɾ.mɐʃ az‿ˈaɾ.mɐʃ]
[ˈso.bɾ(i)‿ɐ ˈtɛ.ʁɐ ˈso.bɾ(i)‿u maɾ]
[az‿ˈaɾ.mɐʃ az‿ˈaɾ.mɐʃ]
[ˈpe.ɫɐ ˈpa.tɾjɐ ɫu.ˈtaɾ]
[ˈkõ.tɾɐ‿uʃ kɐ.ˈɲõj̃ʒ‿mɐɾ.ˈʃaɾ mɐɾ.ˈʃaɾ]

2
[dɨʃ.ˈfɾaɫ.d‿a‿ĩ.ˈvik.tɐ bɐ̃.ˈdɐj.ɾɐ]
[a luʒ‿ˈvi.vɐ du tew sɛw]
[ˈbɾa.d‿ɐ‿ew.ˈɾɔ.pɐ‿a ˈtɛ.ʁɐ‿ĩ.ˈtɐj.ɾɐ]
[puɾ.tu.ˈɣaɫ nɐ̃w̃ pɨ.ɾɨ.ˈsew]
[ˈbɐj.ʒɐ‿u ˈsɔ.ɫu tew ʒu.ˈkũ.du]
[u‿ɔ.ˈsjɐ.nu‿ɐ ʁu.ˈʒiɾ d(i)‿ɐ.ˈmoɾ]
[i tew ˈbɾa.su vẽ.sɨ.ˈðoɾ]
[dew ˈmũ.duʒ‿ˈnɔ.vuz‿aw ˈmũ.du]

[ˈko.ɾu]

3
[saw.ˈðaj u sɔɫ kɨ dɨʃ.ˈpõ.tɐ]
[ˈso.bɾi‿ũ ʁi.ˈðẽ.tɨ puɾ.ˈviɾ]
[ˈsɐ(j).ʒɐ‿u ˈɛ.ku di‿ˈu.mɐ‿ɐ.ˈfɾõ.tɐ]
[u si.ˈnaɫ du ʁɨ.suɾ.ˈʒiɾ]
[ˈʁaj.uʒ‿ˈdɛ.sɐ‿aw.ˈɾɔ.ɾɐ ˈfɔɾ.tɨ]
[sɐ̃w̃ ˈko.mu ˈbɐj.ʒuʒ‿dɨ mɐ̃j̃]
[kɨ nuʒ‿ˈɡwaɾ.ðɐ̃w̃ nu(ʃ)‿suʃ.ˈtɐ̃j]
[ˈkõ.tɾ‿ɐz‿ĩ.ˈʒu.ɾjɐʒ‿dɐ ˈsɔɾ.tɨ]

[ˈko.ɾu]

English translation

I
Heroes of the sea, noble people,
Brave, immortal nation,
Raise once again today
The splendor of Portugal!
Among the mists of memory,
Oh Fatherland, one feels the voice
Of your illustrious forefathers,
That shall lead you on to victory!

Chorus:
To arms, to arms!
Over land, over sea,
To arms, to arms!
For the Fatherland, fight!
Against the cannons, march on, march on!

II
Unfurl the undefeated flag,
In the lively light of your sky!
May Europe cry out to the whole Earth:
Portugal has not perished
Kiss your merry ground
The ocean, roaring with love,
And your victorious arm
Gave new worlds to the world!

Chorus

III
Salute the Sun that rises
Over a gleeful future;
Let the echo of an offense
Be the sign for a comeback.
Rays of this strong dawn
Are like a mother's kisses,
That keep us, sustain us,
Against the injuries of chance.

Chorus

== Protocol ==
Within Portugal, the anthem is played at both civilian and military ceremonies where the country, flag, or head of state (the President of the Republic) is honoured. It is also played at receptions for foreign heads of state, following that of the visitor, and in ceremonies during official presidential visits to other countries.

== See also ==
- "Hino da Carta"
- "Hino da Região Autónoma da Madeira"
- "Hino dos Açores"
