= Hino da Carta =

National anthem of the Kingdom of Portugal

Hymno da Carta
English: Hymn of the Charter
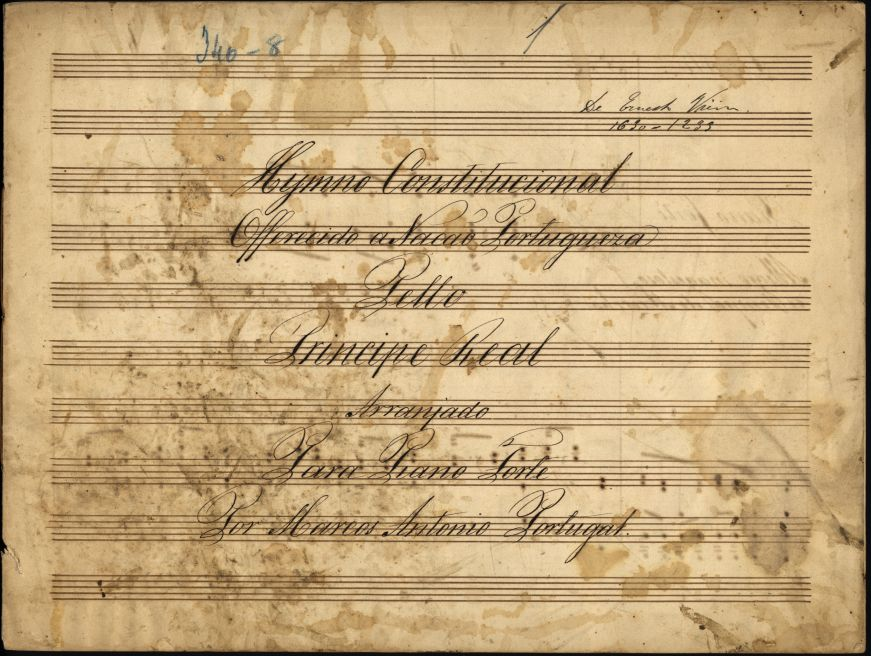
- Copy of the original "Hymno da Carta".
- Former national anthem of Portugal
- Music: Pedro IV of Portugal, 1821
- Adopted: May 1834
- Relinquished: 5 October 1910
- Preceded by: Hymno Patriotico
- Succeeded by: A Portuguesa

"Hino da Carta" (instrumental)

Instrumental version performed by the Band of the Firefighters Corps of Rio de Janeiro, 1906

The Hymno da Carta (English: Hymn of the Charter, modern Portuguese spelling: Hino da Carta) was officially proclaimed the national anthem of the Kingdom of Portugal in May 1834. It was composed by King Pedro IV of Portugal. "Carta" stands for the Constitutional Charter which Pedro IV granted to Portugal. The anthem remained officially in place until 19 July 1911, nine months after Portugal became a republic, and was replaced by A Portuguesa.

== Lyrics ==
Portuguese lyrics	Approximate translation
First stanza
Ó Pátria, Ó Rei, Ó Povo, Ama a tua religião, Observa e guarda sempre Divinal Constituição	O Fatherland, O King and People, Love your religion! Observe and guard always Our Divine Constitution!
Chorus
Viva, viva, viva o Rei; Viva a Santa Religião; Viva, Lusos Valorosos, A feliz Constituição; A feliz Constituição	Hail, hail, hail the King! Hail our Holy Religion! Hail, oh Valiant Lusitanians, Our blessed Constitution; Our blessed Constitution!
Second stanza
Oh com quanto desafogo Na comum agitação Dá vigor às almas todas, Divinal Constituição	Oh with what relief In the common agitation It gives vigor to all souls, Our Divine Constitution
Chorus
Third stanza
Venturosos nós seremos Em perfeita união, Tendo sempre em vista todos Divinal Constituição	Fortunate we shall be In perfect union, Always bearing in sight Our Divine Constitution
Chorus
Fourth stanza
A verdade não se ofusca, O Rei não s'engana, não, Proclamemos, Portugueses, Divinal Constituição	The truth cannot be obscured, The King can never do wrong, Portuguese, let us proclaim Our Divine Constitution
Chorus

== See also ==
- Hino da Independência
- Hymno Patriótico
