= Henrique Lopes de Mendonça =

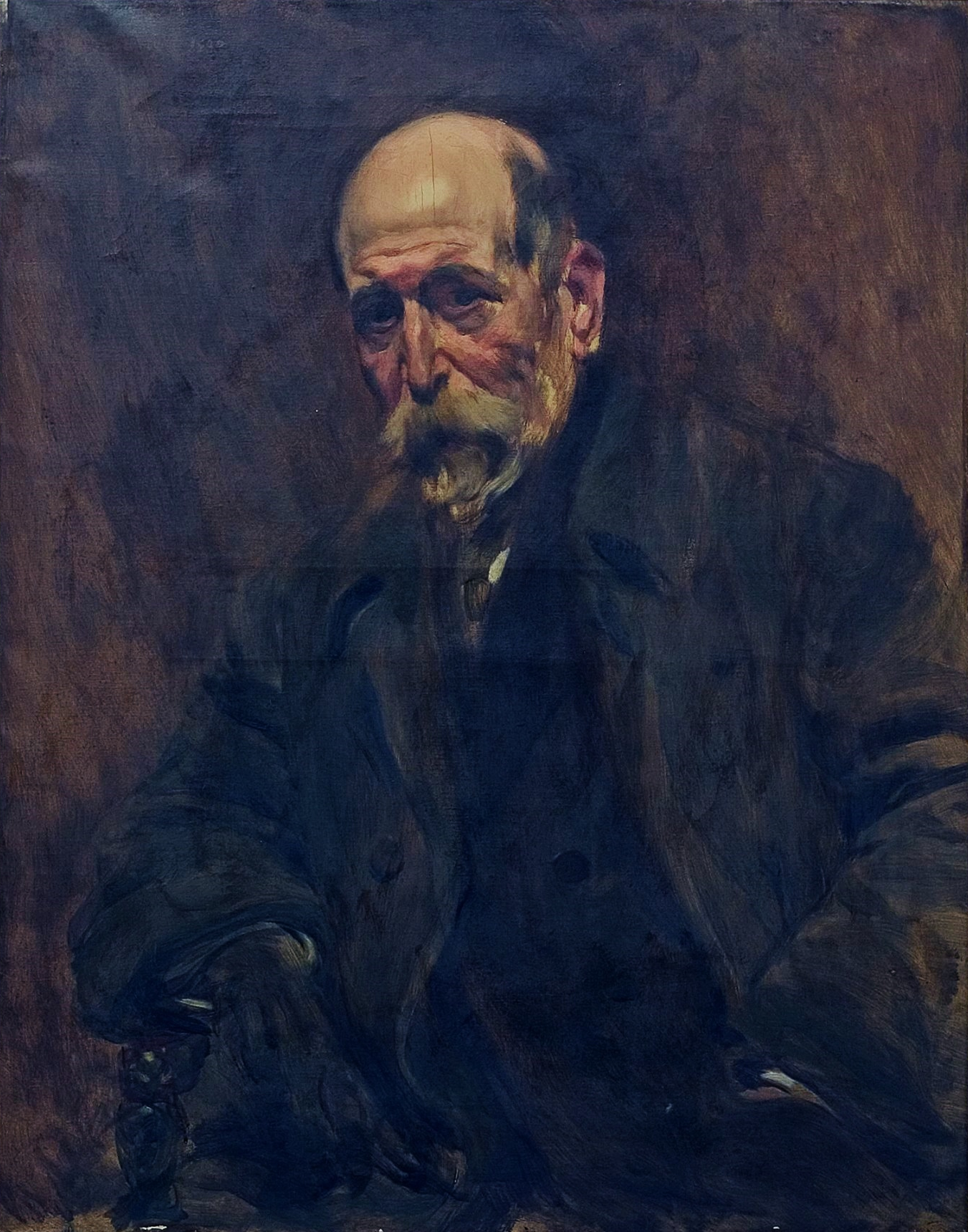
- Born: 3 July 1856; Lisbon, Kingdom of Portugal
- Died: 24 August 1931 (aged 75); Lisbon, Portuguese Republic
- Occupations: Naval officer, poet and playwright
- Known for: Writer of the lyrics of the Portuguese national anthem

Henrique Lopes de Mendonça (3 July 1856 – 24 August 1931) was a Portuguese poet, playwright, novelist, novella and short story writer, and naval officer. He wrote several plays, and with his friend, the composer Alfredo Keil, he wrote the lyrics of the future Portuguese national anthem, A Portuguesa, which was officially adopted in 1911.

== Family ==
He married Maria Amélia Bordalo Pinheiro, daughter of famous painter Manuel Gustavo Bordalo Pinheiro and wife Augusta Maria do Ó de Carvalho Prostes, and had issue, three children:

- Virgínia Bordalo Pinheiro Lopes de Mendonça (1881–1969), twin, a short story writer and playwright, unmarried and without issue
- Vasco Bordalo Pinheiro Lopes de Mendonça (1881–1963), twin, married to Maria Adelaide dos Santos, and had issue, two children:
  - Manuel Vasco dos Santos Lopes de Mendonça, unmarried and without issue
  - Maria da Graça dos Santos Lopes de Mendonça, married on 11 May 1939 to Jorge Maia Ramos Pereira (Vila Praia de Âncora, 6 April 1901 – Lisbon, 16 March 1974), an Officer of the Portuguese Navy, without issue
- Alda Bordalo Pinheiro Lopes de Mendonça, unmarried and without issue
