= Hino da Maria da Fonte =

Portuguese patriotic anthem

English: Maria da Fonte anthem
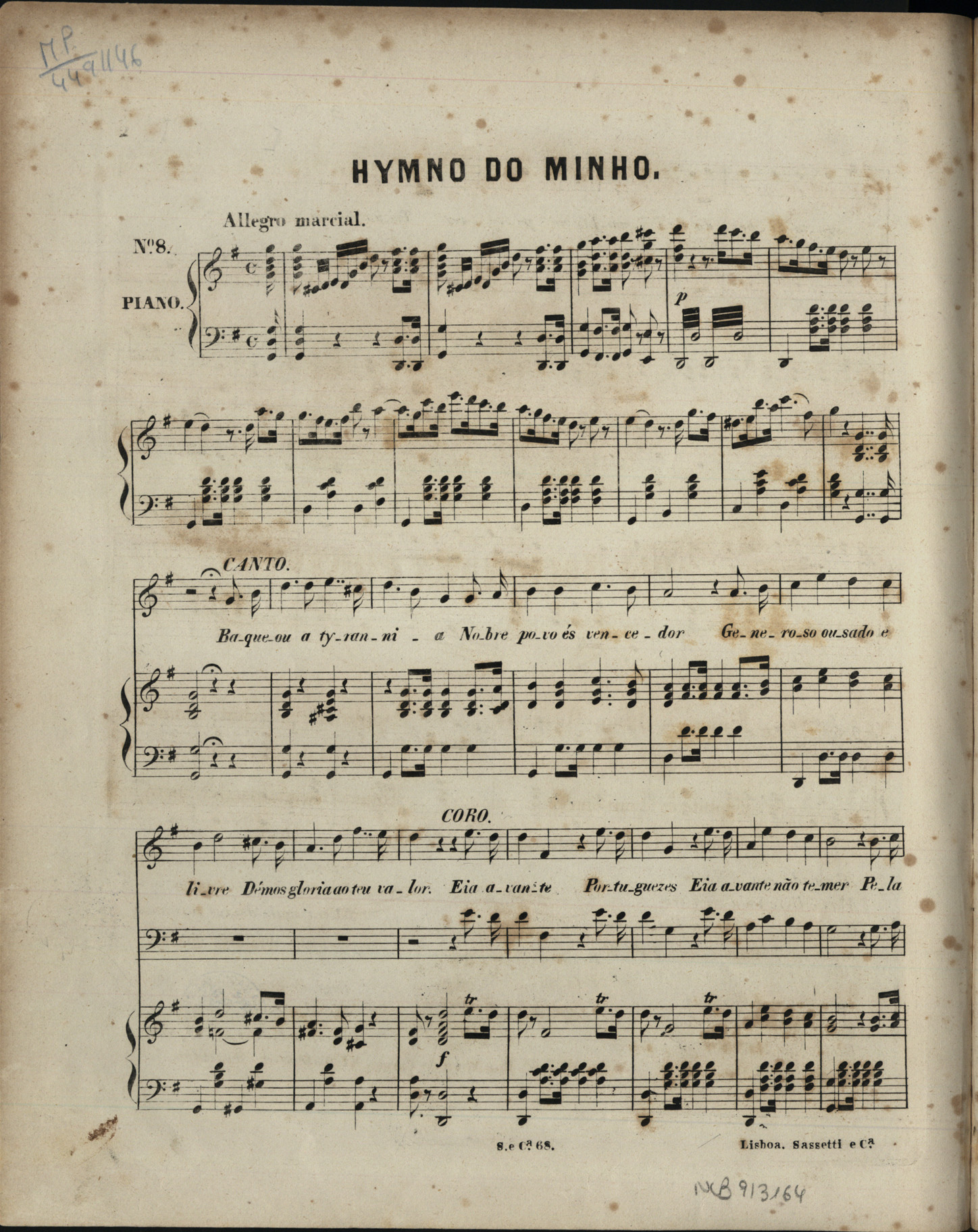
- Sheet music for the Maria da Fonte anthem, 1850 (National Library of Portugal)
- Also known as: Hino do Minho (English: Anthem of Minho)
- Lyrics: Paulo Midosi, 1846
- Music: Angelo Frondoni, 1846

The "Maria da Fonte anthem" (Portuguese: Hino da Maria da Fonte), also known as the "Anthem of Minho" (Portuguese: Hino do Minho) is a Portuguese patriotic anthem, written in 1846 by Angelo Frondoni with lyrics by Paulo Midosi, following the popularly-called Revolution of Maria da Fonte.

== History ==
According to Angelo Frondoni's obituary, written by Acácio Antunes and published on the O Occidente magazine in 1891, the idea for this patriotic anthem came from Paulo Midosi, who was Frondoni's librettist in several operettas. Midosi came to Frondoni so he would compose a song to go with a couple of verses of his own making for "an enthusiastic anthem". The music, that Fondoni wrote in its entirety on the same day, would become the song of the popular revolt in the spring of 1846, against the government of the Count of Tomar.

According to João Augusto Marques Gomes, the Maria da Fonte anthem was sung for the first time on 24 June 1846, a month after the main incidents of the revolt, in the house of the Marquess of Nisa, by an opera singer. The triumph of the liberal faction, assures the return of César de Vasconcelos, José Estêvão, e Mendes Leite, who had been in exile following the Torres Novas pronunciamento. On 6 July, the three attend Almeida Garrett's play O Alfageme de Santarém in D. Maria II National Theatre — during intermission, a band played the Maria da Fonte anthem, and the audience enthusiastically sung, clapped and cheered on.

The Maria da Fonte anthem is still used today in formal military and civic ceremonies in Portugal. It serves as honors music to the legislative speaker, the Prime Minister and the cabinet, as well as to the President of the Supreme Court of Justice, the Chief and Vice-Chief of the Armed Forces General Staff, and the military heads of the Navy, of the Army, and of the Air Force.

== Lyrics ==
While there are multiple historical variations in the lyrics of the song, that tended to be changed according to the political climate of the time, the original lyrics written by Paulo Midosi in 1846 are the following:

Baqueou a tirania
Nobre povo, és vencedor,
Generoso, ousado e livre,
Dêmos glória ao teu valor.

Eia avante, Portugueses!
Eia avante, não temer!
Pela santa Liberdade,
Triunfar ou perecer!

Algemada era a Nação,
Mas é livre ainda uma vez;
Ora, e sempre, é caro à Pátria
O heroísmo Português.

Eia avante, Portugueses...

Lá raiou a Liberdade
Que a Nação há-de aditar!
Glória ao Minho que primeiro
O seu grito fez soar!

Eia avante, Portugueses...

Segue, ó Povo, o belo exemplo
De tamanha heroicidade:
Nunca mais deixes tiranos
Ameaçar a Liberdade.

Eia avante, Portugueses...

Fugi déspotas! Fugi,
Vis algozes da Nação!
Livre, a Pátria vos repulsa,
Terminou a escravidão!

Eia avante, Portugueses...

Tyranny has succumbed
Noble people, you are the victor
Generous, bold, and free
Glory be upon your worth.

Onward, Portuguese!
Onward, never fear!
For blessed Freedom,
Either triumph or perish!

The Nation was in shackles
But it's free again once more;
Now and always the Fatherland is dear
To the Portuguese prowess.

Onward, Portuguese...

The dawn of Freedom is upon us
Filling with Nation with bliss
Glory be upon Minho, the first
Who made their cries heard!

Onward, Portuguese...

Follow, People, the example
Of such heroism:
Never again let tyrants
Threatern our Freedom.

Onward, Portuguese...

Flee, despots! Flee,
Vile butchers of the Nation!
Free, the Fatherland banishes you,
Slavery is no more!

Onward, Portuguese...
